= List of current BBC newsreaders and reporters =

This is a list of newsreaders and journalists currently employed by BBC Television and BBC Radio.

Presenters and journalists appear across BBC television and radio, and also contribute to BBC Online.

BBC News provides television journalism to BBC network bulletins (on BBC One and BBC Two) and programmes as well as the BBC News Channel available around the world and in the United Kingdom. BBC News runs BBC Radio 5 Live, BBC Live News on BBC Sounds and BBC World Service as part of its rolling news coverage, journalists and presenters also contribute to podcasts produced by BBC News for BBC Radio 4, as well as solely for BBC Sounds.

It also provides news for BBC Radio 1, BBC Radio 2, BBC Radio 3, BBC Radio 6 Music, national and international news for BBC Radio Wales, BBC Cymru Wales, BBC Radio Scotland, BBC Alba and BBC Local Radio, though these remain editorally independent.

The BBC has over 5,500 journalists, based both in the United Kingdom and abroad. BBC appointments can be short- or long-term; for example, reporter Peter Bowes revealed on BBC News (broadcast live on 8 September 2020) that Los Angeles has been his home for 25 years.

== Television news presenters ==
=== BBC One and BBC Two ===
Many of the presenters below also work on other BBC News output, and some also work in other parts of the BBC. Other BBC News presenters also provide relief presentation on programmes broadcast on these channels. This list does not include presenters of any broadcasts simulcast from the BBC News channel on BBC One overnight or during weekday mornings on BBC Two.

Presenter	Programme(s)	Notes
Clive Myrie	BBC News at Six, BBC News at Ten, BBC Weekend News, BBC Election Coverage	Chief presenter, presents on location and World Affairs Correspondent
Sophie Raworth	BBC News at Six, BBC News at Ten, BBC Weekend News, BBC Election Coverage	
Reeta Chakrabarti	BBC News at Six, BBC News at Ten, BBC Weekend News, BBC Election Coverage	
Jane Hill	BBC News at Six, BBC News at Ten, BBC Weekend News	
Anna Foster	BBC News at One	
Ben Brown	BBC News at One, BBC Weekend News	Chief Presenter
Sally Bundock	**BBC News**, **Business Today**	Chief Presenter
Fiona Bruce	BBC News at Six, BBC News at Ten, Question Time	
Geeta Guru-Murthy	BBC News, BBC Weekend News	Chief Presenter
Tina Daheley	BBC Breakfast, BBC News at Six, BBC News at Ten, BBC Weekend News	Relief presenter
Victoria Derbyshire	Newsnight	Chief presenter
Faisal Islam	Newsnight	
Jon Kay	BBC Breakfast, BBC News at One	Chief Presenter
Sally Nugent	BBC Breakfast, BBC News at One	
Naga Munchetty	BBC Breakfast	
Charlie Stayt	BBC Breakfast	
Roger Johnson	BBC Breakfast	Relief presenter
Ben Thompson	BBC Breakfast	Relief presenter
Rachel Burden	BBC Breakfast	Relief presenter
Nina Warhurst	BBC Breakfast, BBC News at One	Relief presenter
Martine Croxall	BBC Weekend News (Lunchtime)	
Kasia Madera	BBC Weekend News (Lunchtime)	Chief presenter

=== BBC News (TV channel) ===
The presenters listed below often contribute to various BBC News programmes and may have roles in other departments within the BBC. Additionally, some BBC News presenters not listed here occasionally fill in on programs broadcast on this channel. Noteworthy exceptions are the presenters of the domestic programmes BBC Breakfast, BBC One bulletins, and BBC Newsnight simulcast on the domestic feed, unless they are a chief presenter.

A significant change occurred on April 3, 2023, when the BBC consolidated its domestic and international rolling news channels into a unified operation. To spearhead news broadcasts on the merged channel during weekdays, the BBC appointed six (original) "chief presenters". This has since grown to fourteen. Among them, ten are based in London, one operates out of both London and Salford, while two operate from Washington DC and one operates out of Salford and Singapore.

==== Chief presenters ====
The programmes where the presenter is the lead presenter are shown here in bold. Chief presenters work across BBC One, BBC Two, BBC Radio 4, BBC World Service and primarily the BBC News Channel. The chief presenters broadcast on the channel between 12:00 and 9:00 London time during weekdays. Since October 2026 the chief presenters present Sunday breakfast alternatly (One in eight Sunday's) slot between 05:00—09:00 simulcast on BBC One, expect Madera who presents the lunchtime bulliten and Myrie who presents the evening bulltiens on alternate weekends, and front BBC News coverage of editorially significant events on weekends including the BBC Weekend News. News broadcasts outside of these hours, and on weekends are fronted by other BBC presenters, many of which previously appeared on the domestic and international rolling news channels prior to their merger. All Chief Presenters cover BBC News programmes.

Vaidyanathan main job is as a presenter on the BBC World Service.

Presenter	Base	Programme(s)
Sally Bundock	London	**BBC News**, **Business Today**, BBC Weekend News
Lucy Hockings	London	**BBC News Now**, BBC Weekend News, Newsnight, **Ukrainecast**
Matthew Amroliwala	London	**Verified Live**, BBC Weekend News
Maryam Moshiri	London	**The World Today**, Talking Business, BBC Weekend News
Christian Fraser	London	The Context, **AI Decoded**, **BBC Election Coverage**, BBC Weekend News, The World Today, Verified Live, BBC News Now
Ben Brown	London	BBC News at One, BBC News at Six, BBC News at Ten, BBC Weekend News, The World Today, Verified Live, BBC News Now
Annita McVeigh	London	The World Today, 'Verified Live, BBC News Now, The Context, BBC Weekend News
Geeta Guru-Murthy	London	The World Today, 'Verified Live, BBC News Now, The Context, BBC Weekend News
Clive Myrie	London	**BBC Election Coverage**, BBC News at Six, **BBC News at Ten**, Special Coverage, BBC Weekend News
Victoria Derbyshire	London	**Newsnight**, **Ukrainecast**, Sunday with Laura Kuenssberg (relief)
Rajini Vaidyanathan	London	**Newshour** (BBC World Service), The Context, **BBC Election Coverage**, BBC Weekend News, The World Today, Verified Live, BBC News Now
Kasia Madera	London	BBC News, The World Today, Verified Live, BBC News Now, '**BBC Weekend News'**, '**BBC News Polska'**
Caitríona Perry	Washington	BBC News, **BBC World News America**, The Context, ‘’’BBC US Election Coverage’’’’’
Sumi Somaskanda	Washington	BBC News, **BBC World News America**, The Context, ‘’’BBC US Election Coverage’’’’’
Jon Kay	Salford	**BBC Breakfast**, BBC News at One
Steve Lai	Singapore	**Newsday**, **Business Today**

==== Other presenters ====
The list below reflects presenters' normal postings, but can be posted to cover other studios, they often assume News Correspondent roles when not in a presenting capacity, some have specialisms for example Carl Nasman is the BBC's Environment and Climate Change presenter, he is an anchor and correspondent for coverage of COP summits as well as hosting Future Earth.

Some relief presenters have regular privileged cover roles for lunchtime BBC Weekend News on BBC One, The World Today, Verified Live, BBC News Now, and regular slots to improve continuity. For Presenters who only cover BBC News branded programmes this is stated

Presenter	Base		Programmes	Notes	
Martine Croxall	London	London	BBC News, The World Today, Verified Live, BBC News Now, '**BBC Weekend News'**		
Lucy Grey	London	London	BBC News, The World Today, Verified Live, BBC News Now, BBC Weekend News		
Rich Preston	London	London	BBC News, The World Today, Verified Live, BBC News Now, BBC Weekend News		
Lewis Vaughan Jones	London	London	BBC News, The World Today, Verified Live, BBC News Now, BBC Weekend News		
Vishala Sri-Pathma	London	London	BBC News, Business Today, Talking Business		Business presenters
Lukwesa Burak	London	London	BBC News, Business Today, Talking Business		Business presenters
Samantha Simmonds	London	London	BBC News, Business Today,The World Today, Verified Live, BBC News Now,		Business presenters
Anjana Gadgil	London	London	BBC News		
Nicky Schiller	London	London	BBC News		
Kylie Pentelow	London	London	BBC News		
Lauren Taylor	London	London	BBC News		
Frankie McCamley	London	London	BBC News		
Catherine Byaruhanga	London	London	BBC News		
Tanya Beckett	London	London	BBC News, Business Today, Talking Business, The Inquiry, The World Today, BBC News Now,		
Nancy Kacungira	London	London	'**BBC Africa Enterprise'**		
Lyse Doucet	London	London	Special Coverage	Presents on location, chief international correspondent	
Ricky Boleto	London	London	**BBC News Live**, BBC News	Streaming Presenter	
Ros Atkins	London	Washington	BBC News, **Ros Atkins on...**, **The Media Show**	Analysis Editor	
Emma Vardy	Salford	London	BBC Breakfast, BBC News, BBC News at One, BBC Radio 5 Live		
Anna Foster	BBC News at One, Firing Line, Special Coverage				
Ben Thompson	London	Salford	BBC News, **Business Today**, **Talking Business**, BBC Breakfast, The World Today, Verified Live, BBC News Now,, BBC News at One		
Karin Giannone	London	Salford	BBC News, The World Today, BBC Weekend News,, BBC News at One		
Luxmy Gopal	London	Salford	BBC News, BBC Breakfast, The World Today, Verified Live, BBC News Now		
Sarah Campbell	London	Salford	BBC News, BBC Breakfast, The World Today, Verified Live, BBC News Now		
Mariko Oi	Singapore	Singapore	'**Asia Specific'** Newsday, Business Today		
Monica Miller	Singapore	Singapore	Newsday, Business Today		
Arunoday Mukharji	Singapore	Singapore	Newsday, Business Today		
Suranjana Tewari	Singapore	Singapore	Newsday, Business Today		
Helena Humphrey	London	Washington	BBC World News America, BBC News, The Context, The World Today		
Carl Nasman	Washington DC	Washington DC	BBC World News America, BBC News, The Context, The World Today	Environmental coverage presenter	
Clare Richardson	Washington DC	Washington DC	BBC World News America, BBC News, The Context, The World Today		
Katty Kay	Influential with Katty Kay, The Context, Special Coverage	Senior presenter & Special Correspondent			
Michelle Fleury	New York	Washington	**Business Today**, BBC World News America, BBC News	Business Correspondent	
Erin Delmore	New York	Washington	**Business Today**, BBC World News America, BBC News	Business Correspondent	
Ritika Gupta	New York	Washington	**Business Today**, BBC World News America, BBC News	Business Correspondent	
Waihiga Mwaura	Nairobi	Nairobi	Focus on Africa presenter		
Rhoda Odhiambo	Nairobi	Nairobi	Focus on Africa presenter		

=== Producers & Former Presenters ===
Presenter	Programme(s)
Chris Rogers	Panorama

== Radio news presenters ==
The broadcasters mentioned below frequently contribute to various BBC Radio programmes and may hold roles in different departments within the BBC. Moreover, some BBC Radio hosts not listed here occasionally step in on programmes aired on this channel.

=== BBC Radio 2 ===
Presenter	Programme(s)
Tina Daheley	Scott Mills breakfast show
Jeremy Vine	Jeremy Vine

=== BBC Radio 5 Live ===
Presenter	Programme(s)
Sean Farrington	Wake Up to Money
Rick Edwards	5 Live Breakfast
Rachel Burden	5 Live Breakfast
Nicky Campbell	Nicky Campbell
Naga Munchetty	Naga Munchetty
Nihal Arthanayake	Headliners
Chris Warburton	Saturday Breakfast, Sunday Breakfast, In Short
Eleanor Oldroyd	Saturday Breakfast
Adrian Chiles	Chiles on Friday, Adrian Chiles
Tony Livesey	5 Live Drive
Clare McDonnell	5 Live Drive
Stephen Nolan	Stephen Nolan
Dotun Adebayo	Up All Night
Laura McGhie	Up All Night
Colin Murray	
Patrick Kielty	

=== BBC World Service ===
Presenter	Programme(s)	Notes
James Copnall	Newsday	Alternate
Julian Worricker	Weekend, Newshour	Alternate
Rob Young	Weekend, Newshour	Alternate
Andrew Peach	Newshour, The Newsroom, Newsday, OS, World Business Report, Business Matters	Alternate
Paul Henley	Newshour, Weekend	
Karin Giannone	Outside Source	
James Reynolds	Outside Source	
Nancy Kacungira	Outside Source	
Owen Bennett-Jones	Newshour	Alternate (on rotation)
James Coomarasamy	Newshour	Alternate (on rotation)
James Menendez	Newshour	Alternate (on rotation)
Lyse Doucet	Newshour	Alternate (on rotation)
Tim Franks	Newshour	Alternate (on rotation)
Paul Henley	Newshour	Alternate (on rotation)
Rajini Vaidyanathan	Newshour, | Chief Presenter	Alternate (on rotation)
Lyse Doucet	Newshour, Ukrainecast, The Global Story | Senior presenter	Alternate (on rotation)
Valerie Sanderson	The Newsroom	Alternate (on rotation)
Oliver Conway	The Newsroom	Alternate (on rotation)
Nigel Adderley	The Newsroom	Alternate (on rotation)
Nick Miles	The Newsroom	Alternate (on rotation)
Chris Berrow	The Newsroom	Alternate (on rotation)
Alex Ritson	The Newsroom	Alternate (on rotation)
Jannat Jalil	The Newsroom	Alternate (on rotation)
Bernadette Kehoe	The Newsroom	Alternate (on rotation)
Ankur Desai	The Newsroom	Alternate (on rotation)
Julia McFarlane	The Newsroom	Alternate (on rotation)
Roger Hearing	Business Matters	Alternate (on rotation)
Rahul Tandon	Business Matters	Alternate (on rotation)
Ed Butler	Business Matters	Alternate (on rotation)
Jonathan Josephs	Business Daily	Alternate (on rotation)
Pooneh Ghoddoosi	BBC Partner Hub	

== Journalists ==
♦ = Presenter

=== Foreign correspondents ===
Correspondents typically cover specific regions or countries. However, during major global events, they may be temporarily reassigned to cover breaking news. For example, during the Libyan crisis in 2011 and the Gaza conflict in 2023, correspondents were reassigned to these areas on a rotational basis. While covering these events, they are often referred to as "World Affairs Correspondents."

Correspondents may also be reassigned to cover stories outside their usual posting. For example, Hugo Bachega, Beirut Correspondent, became a "Middle East Correspondent" while covering the fall of the Assad regime in Syria. These correspondents are also supported by the BBC World Service foreign language services, in particular BBC Arabic and BBC Perisan, as well as the specialist investigations unit.

Additionally, correspondents may be reassigned to cover for colleagues on vacation, especially during peak travel times such as the British summer period and Christmas.

Due to the BBC's history and structure there are BBC News Editors and BBC World Service Regional Editors, the distinction between these roles has largely disappeared as the News operations have become streamlined, Regional Editors aid BBC News in times when the Editor is not available.

==== World Affairs ====
===== Editor ===== John Simpson ===== International Editor ===== Jeremy Bowen ===== Foreign Editor ===== Paul Danahar	===== Correspondents ===== : Orla Guerin – Istanbul – Senior International Correspondent; Vacant– International Development Correspondent; Stephanie Hegarty – Global Population Correspondent; Richard Galpin
===== Chief Correspondent ===== Lyse Doucet ♦ ===== Chief Presenter ===== Clive Myrie ♦	===== Correspondents ===== : Orla Guerin – Istanbul – Senior International Correspondent; Vacant– International Development Correspondent; Stephanie Hegarty – Global Population Correspondent; Richard Galpin

==== Europe ====
===== Editor ===== Katya Adler ♦ ===== Regional Editors ===== : Danny Aeberhard; Paul Moss; ===== Russia Editor ===== Steve Rosenberg	===== Correspondents ===== : Nick Beake – Brussels; Jessica Parker – Berlin; Damien McGuinness – Berlin; Hugh Schofield – Paris; Imogen Foulkes – Geneva; Steve Rosenberg - Moscow; Mark Lowen – Rome; Nick Thorpe – Budapest; Rob Cameron – Prague; Anna Holligan – The Hague; Adam Easton – Warsaw; Sarah Rainsford – Warsaw – Eastern Europe Correspondent; James Waterhouse – Kyiv – Ukraine Correspondent

==== Asia/Pacific ====
===== Editor ===== Vacant ===== Deputy Editor ===== Aparna Alluri ===== Regional Editors ===== : Celia Hatton ♦; Michael Bristow; ===== South East Asia Regional Editor ===== Anbarasan Ethirajan	===== Correspondents ===== : Jonathan Head – Bangkok; Sanjoy Majumder – Delhi; Laura Bicker – China; Stephen McDonell – Beijing; Yogita Limaye – South Asia and Afghanistan Correspondent; Rupert Wingfield-Hayes – Taiwan; Jake Kwon - Seoul; Caroline Davies – Pakistan; Soutik Biswas – India; Katy Watson - Sydney; Phil Mercer – Australia; Azadeh Moshiri - Delhi; Archana Shukla - Mumbai - Business Correspondent; Arunoday Mukharji - Mumbai - Business Correspondent

==== North America ====
===== Editor ===== Sarah Smith	===== Correspondents ===== : David Willis – Los Angeles / Washington; Nomia Iqbal – Washington; Bernd Debusmann - White House; Ione Wells – Washington – Political Correspondent (From September 2026); Tom Bateman – Washington – State Department Correspondent; Anthony Zurcher – Washington – Senior North America Correspondent; Tom Brook – New York City – Entertainment Correspondent; Michelle Fleury – New York City – Business Correspondent; Samira Hussain - New York City - Business Correspondent; Nada Tawfik - New York City; Peter Bowes – Los Angeles – Freelance Correspondent; Shaimaa Khalil – Los Angeles – Los Angeles Correspondent; John Sudworth – Washington; Rowan Bridge - North America Correspondent
===== Chief North America Correspondent ===== Gary O'Donoghue
===== Special Correspondent ===== Katty Kay

==== Middle East ====
===== Editor ===== Rafi Berg ===== World Service Regional Editor ===== Sebastian Usher	===== Correspondents ===== : Rami Ruhayem – Beirut; Lina Sinjab – Beirut; Yolande Knell – Jerusalem; Hugo Bachega – Beirut; Quentin Sommerville – Beirut; Lucy Williamson - Jerusalem

==== Africa ====
===== Editor ===== Barbara Plett Usher	===== Correspondents ===== : Emmanuel Igunza – Kenya; Rana Jawad – Tunis – North Africa Correspondent; Lerato Mbele – Cape Town – Business Correspondent; Mayeni Jones – Lagos - Africa Correspondent; Simi Jolaoso - Lagos - Africa Correspondent; Nomsa Maseko – Durban; Tomi Oladipo – Africa Security Correspondent; Bassam Bounenni– Tunis – North Africa Correspondent; Arwa Barkallah – Dakar – West Africa Correspondent; Daniel De Simone – Johannesburg; Anne Soy – Senior Africa Correspondent

=== Latin America ===
==== Correspondents ====
- Will Grant – Mexico
- Daniel Gallas – São Paulo – Business Correspondent

=== UK and Ireland correspondents ===
Only network correspondents are listed, but additional correspondents from national and regional news teams also report for the network.

==== Editor ====
- Ed Thomas

==== Senior UK Correspondent ====
- Sima Kotecha

==== England ====
===== Correspondents =====
- Keith Doyle
- Simon Jones
- Jon Donnison
- Lisa Hampelé
- Helena Lee
- Vincent McAviney
- Ben Geoghegan
- Lauren Moss

====== North of England ======
- Danny Savage

====== Midlands ======
- Phil Mackie
- Navtej Johal

====== South of England ======
- Duncan Kennedy

====== West and South West England ======
- Dan Johnson

==== Scotland ====
===== Editor ===== James Cook	===== Correspondents ===== : Lorna Gordon; Jamie McIvor

==== Wales ====
===== Correspondents =====
- Tomos Morgan
- Hywel Griffith

==== Ireland ====
===== Correspondents =====
- Chris Page
- Sara Girvan

=== Specialist correspondents ===
==== Politics ====
Based in the Westminster Millbank newsroom, flexible correspondents are employed as there is frequent uptake from the nations/regions to supplement local coverage nationally such as during a general election. During General Election periods foreign and specialist correspondents are drafted in to increase coverage, and specialist correspondents often cover the election from their specialism's angle. Each BBC English Region has its own political editor and correspondent.

===== Editor ===== Chris Mason ===== Deputy Editor ===== Vicki Young	===== Correspondents ===== : Helen Catt; Alex Forsyth; Damian Grammaticas; Susana Mendonça; Hannah Miller; Leila Nathoo; Peter Saull; Iain Watson; Rob Watson – BBC World Service; Ben Wright; Sean Curran – Parliamentary Correspondent; Susan Hulme - Parliamentary Correspondent; Alicia McCarthy - Parliamentary Correspondent; Joe Pike – Political Investigations Correspondent; Ione Wells – Washington – North America Political Correspondent (From September 2026); Analysts: Peter Barnes – Elections and Political Analyst
===== National Editors ===== Gareth Lewis – Political Editor, Wales Enda McClafferty – Political Editor, Northern Ireland Glenn Campbell – Political Editor, Scotland
===== Chief Political Correspondent ===== Henry Zeffman

==== Family & Education ====
===== Editor ===== Branwen Jeffreys	===== Correspondents ===== : Vanessa Clarke; Hazel Shearing; Josh Parry, LGBT & Identity Reporter

==== Home & Legal Affairs ====
===== Editor ===== Mark Easton	===== Correspondents ===== : Daniel Sandford; Tom Symonds; June Kelly; Dominic Casciani – Home and Legal Correspondent

==== Security and Defence ====
===== Correspondents =====
====== Security ======
- Frank Gardner

====== Defence ======
- Jonathan Beale
- Jonathan Marcus
- Chris Partridge – Weapons Analyst

==== Diplomatic and Royal ====
===== Editor ===== Vacant	===== Correspondents ===== ====== Diplomatic ====== : James Landale; Caroline Hawley; Paul Adams; Jonathan Marcus; ====== Royal ====== : Jonny Dymond; Nicholas Witchell; Sean Coughlan; Daniela Relph – Senior Royal Correspondent; Sarah Campbell

==== Economics ====
===== Editor ===== Faisal Islam	===== Correspondents ===== : Peter Ruddick – Work and Money Reporter; Andrew Verity; Andrew Walker
===== Deputy Editor ===== Dharshini David	===== Correspondents ===== : Peter Ruddick – Work and Money Reporter; Andrew Verity; Andrew Walker

==== Business ====
==== Editor ==== Simon Jack	===== Correspondents ===== : Emma Simpson; Theo Leggett – International Business Correspondent; Suranjana Tewari – Asia Business Correspondent – Singapore; Nick Marsh – Asia Business Reporter – Singapore; Michelle Fleury - New York; Samira Hussain - New York Correspondent; Jonathan Josephs - Global business & trade; Katy Austin - Transport; Zoe Conway - Employment; Sameer Hashmi – Middle East Business Correspondent – Dubai; Lerato Mbele – Africa Business Correspondent' – Cape Town

==== Sport ====
BBC Sport has many more correspondents focussed on Final Score and Match of the Day programmes, all BBC Sport presenters are also correspondents for the department.

===== Editor ===== Dan Roan	===== Correspondents ===== : David Ornstein; Natalie Pirks; Andy Swiss; Katie Gornall; Joe Wilson; Laura Scott

==== Health ====
===== Editor ===== Hugh Pym ===== Medical Editor ===== Fergus Walsh	===== Correspondents ===== : Tulip Mazumdar – Global Health Correspondent; Nick Triggle; Catherine Burns; Sophie Hutchinson; Dominic Hughes

==== Social Affairs ====
===== Editor ===== Alison Holt	===== Correspondents ===== : Megha Mohan – Gender and Identity Correspondent; Michael Buchanan; Alison Holt; Nikki Fox – Disability Correspondent; Adina Campbell – Community Affairs Correspondent

==== Religious Affairs ====
===== Editor ===== Aleem Maqbool	===== Correspondent ===== : Lebo Diseko – Global Religion Reporter

==== Transport ====
===== Correspondents =====
- Katy Austin

==== Technology ====
Based in Glasgow, these also benefit from Tech Now reports and journalists as contributors.

===== Editor ===== Zoe Kleinman	===== Correspondents ===== : Marc Cieslak – Artificial Intelligence Correspondent; Lily Jamali – North America Technology Correspondent; Liv McMahon - Technology Reporter; Joe Tidy - Cyber Correspondent; Kali Hays - Technology Reporter; Richard Westcott – Science and Tech Correspondent

==== Science ====
===== Editor ===== Rebecca Morelle	===== Correspondents ===== : Pallab Ghosh; Victoria Gill – Global Science Correspondent; Richard Westcott – Science and Tech Correspondent; Laura Foster – Health Science Correspondent

==== Environment and Climate ====
Based in Cardiff, shares correspondent with the science unit, due to subject matter overlap.

===== Editor ===== Justin Rowlatt	===== Correspondents ===== : Matt McGrath – Environment; Claire Marshall – Environment and Rural Affairs; Esme Stallard

==== Culture, Arts and Media ====
===== Editor ===== Katie Razzall	===== Correspondents ===== : Noor Nanji; Lizo Mzimba – Entertainment Correspondent; David Sillito – Media and Arts Correspondent; Mark Savage – Music Reporter; Charlotte Gallagher; Tom Brook – New York City

==== BBC Verify ====
The BBC's fact-checking service is centred around social media output but also heavily features on Verified Live. Some Verify Correspondents also perform a role in other departments, e.g., Nick Eardley, who is a Political Correspondent and Verify Correspondent (albeit focussing on political fact-checking).

===== Analysis Editor ===== Ros Atkins	===== Correspondents ===== : Marianna Spring – Social Media and Global Disinformation Correspondent; Ben Chu – Policy and Analysis Correspondent; Nick Eardley – Political Correspondent; Olga Robinson; Tom Edgington

==== Contributing Editors ====
- Reeta Chakrabarti ♦

==== Special correspondents ====
- Lucy Manning
- Fergal Keane
- Judith Moritz

=== Programme correspondents ===
Newsnight

- Nicholas Watt – Political Editor

== Segment presenters ==
BBC News employs a number of business and sports presenters to anchor sections of news programmes.

=== Sport ===
Sport Presenters are employed by BBC Sport but feature, write and report sport stories for BBC News. The large number of sports presenters is due to the Saturday fixture lists where most presenters become correspondents for Final Score. It is not accurate to detail the regular shifts of sport segment presenters as they are all on a rotating shift basis, and all feature across the segments semi-regularly.

- Mike Bushell
- Reshmin Chowdhury
- Katherine Downes
- Russell Fuller
- Karthi Gnanasegaram
- Lizzie Greenwood-Hughes
- Damian Johnson
- Jonathan Legard
- Gary Lineker
- Tim Hague
- Tulsen Tollett
- Olly Foster
- Will Perry
- Azi Farni
- Hugh Ferris
- John Watson
- Steven Wyeth
- Marc Edwards
- Chetan Pathak
- Laura McGhie
- Gavin Ramjaun
- Louisa Pilbeam

=== Business ===
Presenter	Regular shifts	Notes
Sally Bundock	Business Today	Morning editions
Ben Thompson	Business Today	London editions
Sean Farrington	Wake Up to Money, Today (BBC Radio 4)	
Will Bain	Wake Up to Money, Today (BBC Radio 4)	
Felicity Hannah	Money Box Live, Wake Up To Money, Today (BBC Radio 4)	
Tanya Beckett	BBC News, Business Today	
Paul Lewis	BBC Breakfast, Money Box	
Vishala Sri Pathma	BBC News Channel, Business Today	Relief presenter
Samantha Simmonds	BBC News Channel, Business Today	Relief presenter
Nina Warhurst	BBC Breakfast	

== Weather forecasters ==
BBC Weather is delivered by a team of broadcast meteorologists and weather presenters to deliver forecasts across its range of television and radio services. Most forecasters work across all mediums and shifts.

=== Chief Presenters ===
- Simon King – Salford
- Carol Kirkwood
- Barra Best

=== Others ===
- Darren Bett
- Katerina Christodoulou
- Stav Danaos
- Chris Fawkes
- Alexis Green
- Alina Jenkins
- Sarah Keith-Lucas
- Louise Lear
- Lucy Martin
- Susan Powell
- Ben Rich
- Elizabeth Rizzini
- Tomasz Schafernaker
- Matt Taylor
- Helen Willetts
- Owain Wyn Evans

== Programme presenters ==
Presenter	Programme(s)	Notes
Tom Brook	Talking Movies, Talking Television	
Sophie Ikenye	Focus on Africa	
Lukwesa Burak	Focus on Africa	
Waihiga Mwaura	Focus on Africa	
Ade Adepitan	The Travel Show	
Benjamin Zand	The Travel Show, Our World	Producer
Evan Davis	The Bottom Line	
Vicki Young	Politics Live	
Zeinab Badawi	HARDtalk	
Stephen Sackur	HARDtalk	
Tim Sebastian	The Doha Debates	
Samira Ahmed	Newswatch	
John Simpson	Unspun World	
Caroline Hawley	Unspun World	
Stacey Dooley	Stacey Dooley Investigates (shown on BBC Three)	
Tanya Beckett	Talking Business	
Levi Jouavel	The Catch Up	
Kirsty Grant	The Catch Up	
Callum Tulley	The Catch Up	

== See also ==
- List of former BBC newsreaders and journalists
- Category:British journalists
  - Category:British television journalists
