= Business Today (TV programme) =

Daily television news programme for BBC News

- Title card used since 2024
- Created by: BBC News
- Presented by: Sally Bundock; Ben Thompson; Michelle Fleury; Steve Lai
- Country of origin: United Kingdom
- Original language: English

Production
- Production locations: Studios E & C, Broadcasting House, London; New York; Singapore
- Running time: 12 - 25 minutes

Original release
- Network: BBC News; BBC One; BBC Two
- Release: 7 May 2024 – present

Related
- World Business Report (TV programme); Asia Business Report; Middle East Business Report; Africa Business Report; India Business Report; Business Edition

Business Today is a television business news programme produced by BBC News and shown on BBC News Channel and BBC One on weekdays. Each edition lasts 25 minutes. The 05:30 edition is also seen on BBC One, and the 11:30 edition also airs on BBC Two during their simulcasts of BBC News Channel. The main presenters of the programme are Sally Bundock, Ben Thompson, Michelle Fleury (New York), and Steve Lai (Singapore). Other business journalists act as relief presenters.

This show was introduced to replace World Business Report and Asia Business Report, which ran for decades.

During the 14:30 segment, the show is renamed Business Today - NYSE Opening Bell, focussing on the New York Stock Exchange.

== Programme details ==
Air time (GMT)	Duration (mins)	Location	Main presenter Monday - Thursday	Main presenter Friday	Notes
01:30	12	Singapore	Steve Lai		
02:30	12	Singapore	Steve Lai		Simulcasted on BBC One
03:30	12	Singapore	Steve Lai		Simulcasted on BBC One
04:30		Singapore	Steve Lai		Simulcasted on BBC One
05:30	20	London	Sally Bundock	Lukwesa Burak	Simulcasted on BBC One
06:30	20	London	Sally Bundock	Lukwesa Burak	
07:30	20	London	Sally Bundock	Lukwesa Burak	
08:30	10	London	Sally Bundock	Lukwesa Burak	Unbranded
11:30	12	London	Ben Thompson	Lukwesa Burak	Simulcasted on BBC Two
14:30	12	New York	Michelle Fleury		Focusing on the opening bell of the NYSE
16:30	12	London	Ben Thompson	N/A	Focusing on the closing bell and end of the day in European markets

=== Relief presenters ===
==== London ====
- Vishala Sri-Pathma

==== Singapore ====
- Arunoday Mukharji
- Suranjana Tewari
