= Afternoon Live (2017 TV programme) =

BBC News Channel programme

Afternoon Live is a programme broadcast on the BBC News Channel between 2:00 pm and 5:00 pm weekdays. It first aired on 2 October 2017. Very early in the COVID-19 pandemic, reduced presenter availability in the official lockdown periods ended the programme. The final edition was on 17 March 2020. The programme did not return with the merger of BBC News with BBC World in spring 2023. A programme now called Verified Live runs between 3:00pm and 6:00pm UK time, normally presented by Matthew Amroliwala.

== Presenters ==
The programme's main presenter between 2017 and March 2020 was Simon McCoy, who tended to present the programme Monday to Thursday. Simon continued to present programmes on the BBC after Afternoon Live ceased but later resigned from the BBC in March 2021.

Years	Presenters	Role
2017–2020	Martine Croxall	Regular Relief Presenter
2017–2020	Ben Brown	Regular Relief Presenter
2017–2020	Rebecca Jones	Occasional Relief Presenter
2018–2019	Reeta Chakrabarti	Occasional Relief Presenter
2018–2019	Rachel Schofield	Occasional Relief Presenter
2018–2019	Shaun Ley	Occasional Relief Presenter
2019	Samantha Simmonds	Occasional Relief Presenter
2019	Geeta Guru-Murthy	Occasional Relief Presenter

=== Former presenters ===
- Carole Walker (2018-2019)
- Nicholas Owen (2019)
- Carrie Gracie (2019-2020)
- Simon McCoy (2017-2020)

== See also ==
- List of current BBC newsreaders and reporters
