= Ben Boulos =

English presenter and journalist

- Born: Benjamin Mark Bland
- Other name: Ben Boulos
- Occupations: Newsreader, journalist, television presenter, radio presenter
- Notable credits: BBC World News; World News Today; Business Live; Talking Business; The Briefing; Business Briefing; World Business Report; Newsday; Outside Source; GMT; BBC News; The Papers
- Website: www.benboulos.com

Benjamin Mark Bland, known professionally as Ben Boulos, is an English presenter and journalist.

== Broadcasting career ==
Formerly, he worked for BBC News, specialising in business for UK and global audiences on programmes including Business Live, Talking Business and World Business Report, as well as being one of the main relief presenters for BBC World News, BBC News Channel and BBC World Service. Boulos also presented Around the World By BBC News weekdays on Quibi.. Other BBC News programmes hosted by Boulos included the main bulletins, Newsday, BBC Breakfast (shown domestically in the UK), Outside Source, World News Today and several domestic UK reports for BBC News on a relief/need-by-need basis. He also hosted business news and weekend overnight broadcasts of BBC World News which are shown around the world on BBC World News, the BBC News Channel and on BBC One in the UK and public television in the US.

In November 2023, Boulos mistook guest Teresa Wickham's shaking head as a reaction to a statement he made, before she later clarified it was just her dystonia disorder. Boulos apologised for his mistake.

In January 2026, Boulos left the BBC to take a new job at CNBC, where he co-anchored Squawk Box Europe. He left CNBC in October 2026 presenting his last edition of Squark Box Europe on 16 October 2026.

== Personal life ==
He is a competitive cyclist in his spare time, and has represented Surrey at amateur level. He originally worked under his birth name Ben Bland, but in February 2021, he announced that he would use the name Ben Boulos, his mother's surname, in his professional work due to another journalist having the same name causing confusion, and also because he wanted a surname that conveys "a more complete picture of who I am and the influences on my life".
