= Victoria Valentine =

British journalist, newsreader, and television presenter

- Born: 14 May 1984 (age 42)
- Other name: Victoria Fritz
- Education: University of Cambridge; Cambridge Judge Business School (MBA)
- Occupations: Journalist; newsreader; television presenter
- Years active: 2006–present
- Spouse: Dan Fritz (m. 2011; sep. 2022)
- Children: 2

Victoria Valentine (née Trench, formerly Fritz; born 14 May 1984) is a former English journalist, newsreader, and television presenter.

She was a presenter on BBC World News, presenting the shows main news bulletins, and presenter for BBC World News's live business news programmes World Business Report and Worklife. She was also a presenter and business correspondent on BBC News and BBC Breakfast. She stepped down from her role presenting her last BBC News bulletin on 22 September 2023.

== Early life and education ==
Victoria Valentine was born on 14 May 1984. Her mother is Irish.

Valentine was educated at Woldingham School in Surrey. She studied law and economics, and environmental economics at the University of Cambridge from 2003 to 2006, and later studied environmental economics at Cambridge Judge Business School from 2006 to 2007, graduating with a Master of Business Administration degree.

== Career ==
In 2006, Valentine began her broadcasting career at Reuters' financial commentary brand, Breakingviews.

In September 2008, Valentine joined the BBC as a senior broadcast journalist, where she produced business and economics stories for BBC News. In March 2013, Valentine became a business news presenter and correspondent for BBC News and begin presenting business bulletins and reporting on breaking stories. Since 2015, Valentine has presented multiple news programmes on BBC World News, including the main bulletins, and the business news programmes World Business Report and Worklife. She is also a business correspondent and relief presenter for BBC Breakfast.

In January 2020, Valentine appeared as a contestant on the quiz show Celebrity Mastermind with the specialist subject "The Chelsea Flower Show". She won the show with 15 points.

In March 2020, it was announced that Valentine would co-host a new global news show Around the World by BBC News with Ben Bland for the short-form streaming platform Quibi. The show was short lived with the shut down of Quibi in December 2020.

== Personal life ==
In 2011, Valentine married writer and barrister, Dan Fritz. They have two children together.

On 15 November 2016, Valentine went into labour coming off-air after presenting a business news bulletin on BBC Breakfast. Valentine's husband was unable to attend the birth being stuck in traffic on the M6 motorway, so BBC Breakfast presenter Sally Nugent acted as her birthing partner.

On 26 October 2022, Valentine announced that she and Fritz were divorcing. She also announced that she would be changing her surname to "Valentine", her mother's maiden name, saying that "going back [to my father's family name, rather my mother's original family name] felt emotionally regressive, stunting, depressing and quite frankly, anti-feminist."
