= Worklife (TV programme) =

- Worklife titles
- Also known as: Business Edition with Tanya Beckett (2010–2015); Business Edition with Jamie Robertson (2011–2014); Business Live (2015–2019)
- Created by: BBC World News; BBC News Channel
- Presented by: Sally Bundock; Ben Thompson
- Country of origin: United Kingdom
- Original language: English

Production
- Production locations: Studio C, Broadcasting House, London / Singapore / New York City
- Running time: 30 minutes

Original release
- Network: BBC World News; BBC News Channel
- Release: 1 February 2010 (as Business Edition); 1 June 2015 (as Business Live); 7 October 2019 (as Worklife)

Related
- Business Edition with Tanya Beckett; World News Today World Business Report Outside Source

Worklife (Previously Business Edition and Business Live) is a news programme that premiered on BBC World News on 1 February 2010 as part of a network-wide refresh. The programme is presented by Tanya Beckett (Monday–Thursday) and Jamie Robertson (Friday). The programme examines the inner workings of business, translating complex financial stories to give viewers a clearer understanding of the rapidly changing global economy, and how it will impact on their lives. It also includes the top global news stories of the day as well as weather updates.

The current presenting line up is Sally Bundock with either David Eades or Karin Giannone in the morning.

In 2015, the programme was relaunched as Business Live with two editions one at 08:30 BST/GMT and 20:00 BST/GMT. Originally there was only one morning edition but was expanded to two in November.

== History ==
Business Live titles

Business Edition was reduced from 60 to 45 then to a 30-minute structure on 9 November 2010. The programme was replaced with an edition of BBC World News from April 2011. Business Edition with Tanya Beckett returned to BBC World News on 18 June 2012 at 22:00 GMT. This was originally an edition of World News Today: Business Edition. In June 2015 the program was ended to allow Outside Source and World News Today to be simulcast on the BBC News Channel.

It returned in November 2015 replacing an edition of World News Today under the name Business Live.

On 7 October 2019, Business Live was renamed to Worklife to reflect with sister programme Worklife India and its BBC Worklife website.

== About the programme ==
=== Morning edition ===
This edition is presented live from London with two presenters and broadcast on BBC News Channel and BBC World News at 08:30 GMT/BST (09:30 CET). It gives the latest in Europe, Asia closing view, US recap.

After the top story, the headlines will be presented from the catwalk. Then, it switches to the presenter sitting at the desk. After that, the catwalk presenter will present the programme in the first half of the show. After the look at the markets segment they will join at the desk with a guest. In the last half, they will have a look at social media segment and then the business papers review. This was the first edition of the programme until November 2015 when its second edition launched in the evening.

=== Evening edition ===
This edition is presented live from London and New York. Tanya Beckett and Michelle Fleury are the main presenters and the show is broadcast at 20:00 GMT/BST (21:00 CET) only on BBC World News.

During the top stories, the New York presenter will appear first, then the London presenter at the desk. The headlines intro is the same as the morning edition. The programme is mainly presented from the catwalk in Studio C, New Broadcasting House, London. This was originally an edition of World News Today and replaced the Business Edition which was broadcast at 21:00 GMT/BST (2200 CET), Business Edition was also an edition of World News Today until 2010, but was replaced by Outside Source in June 2015.

== Presenters ==
	Presenter	Role
2015–present	Sally Bundock	Main Presenter (Mon-Thurs)
2018–present	David Eades	Main Presenter (Mon-Tues)
2019–present	Karin Giannone	Main Presenter (Wed-Thurs)
2015–2018–present	Victoria Valentine	Relief Presenter
2015–present	Susannah Streeter	Relief Presenter
2018–present	Maryam Moshiri	Relief Presenter
2018–present	Ben Bland	Relief Presenter
2018–present	Samantha Simmonds	Relief Presenter
2018–present	Tim Willcox	Relief Presenter
2019–present	Nuala McGovern	Relief Presenter
2019–present	Lewis Vaughan-Jones	Relief Presenter
2019–present	James Mendenez	Relief Presenter
2019–present	James Reynolds	Relief Presenter
2020–present	Celia Hatton	Relief Presenter

Former presenters

2015	Aaron Heslehurst	Main Presenter (Fri)
2015–2019	Ben Thompson	Main Presenter (Mon-Thurs)
2015–2019	Alice Baxter	Relief Presenter
2015–2019	Jamie Robertson	Relief Presenter
2018	Rachel Horne	Relief Presenter
2018–2019	Vishala Sri-Pathma	Relief Presenter
2019	Tadhg Enright	Relief Presenter
2019	Egon Cossou	Relief Presenter
