= Jessica Parker =

Jessica Parker may refer to:

- Jessica Parker Kennedy (born 1984), Canadian actress
- Sarah Jessica Parker (born 1965), American actress
- Jessica "Jess" Parker, a Chilean drag queen who competed on season one of The Switch Drag Race.
- Jessica Parker, BBC reporter
