= Martine Dennis =

British news anchor

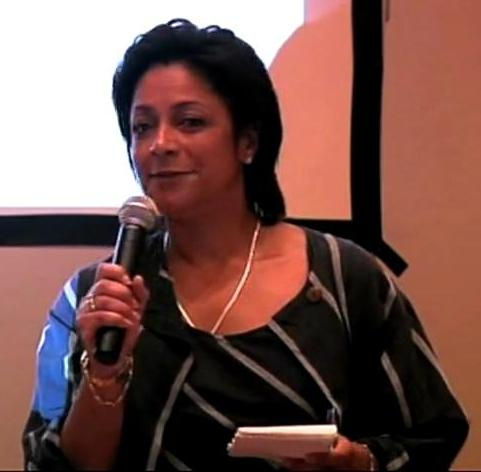
- Martine Dennis in 2011
- Born: London
- Occupations: Newsreader, Journalist, news presenter
- Notable credit: The World Today
- Children: 2

Martine Dennis is a British news anchor. She was most recently a presenter with Al Jazeera English, and before that BBC World News.

== Career ==
Martine began her broadcasting career as a graduate trainee at LBC/IRN in London in 1983. She specialised in parliamentary reporting, but also made radio documentaries, notably: Zimbabwe - Five Years after Independence. She also covered the 1985 Commonwealth Heads of Government Meeting (CHOGM), held in Nassau in the Bahamas, interviewing, among others: Rajiv Gandhi, Margaret Thatcher and Edward Seaga.

Later in 1985, she joined BBC World Service radio at the United Nations, in New York, covering the Iran–Iraq war and interviewing a number of world leaders.

In 1987 she became a presenter-producer for Focus on Africa, the BBC African Service, based at Bush House in London and in 1989 Martine became a presenter, reporter and producer at Sky News, London. She was an overnight news presenter until 1991 when she went to South Africa. In South Africa she freelanced for BBC World Service, covering South Africa's first democratic election.

In 1994 she became the presenter of Carte Blanche, South Africa's top weekly current affairs feature programme. In 1995, Martine returned to London to work on current affairs programmes, including Correspondent.

In 2014 Martine left the BBC World News to go to Al Jazeera after 20 years at the corporation.

BBC News

On her return from South Africa in 1995, Martine worked briefly as a correspondent for BBC1's Here and Now weekly programme. Later she became a main presenter of BBC World News. She presented the first edition of The World Today with Tanya Beckett when it was launched in September 2001. She remained the main presenter of The World Today (BBC News at 0500 GMT) until she left the BBC in 2014. She also presented BBC World News on various time slots.

Al Jazeera English

On 19 February 2014 Martine began her new role at Al Jazeera English. She presented Inside Story, in addition to anchoring regular news bulletins. She has also had special assignments, such as interviewing Masoud Barzani about Kurdish independence. In 2020 Martine left Al Jazeera English after six years with the channel.
