= Dharshini David =

British broadcaster and author

Dharshini David OBE
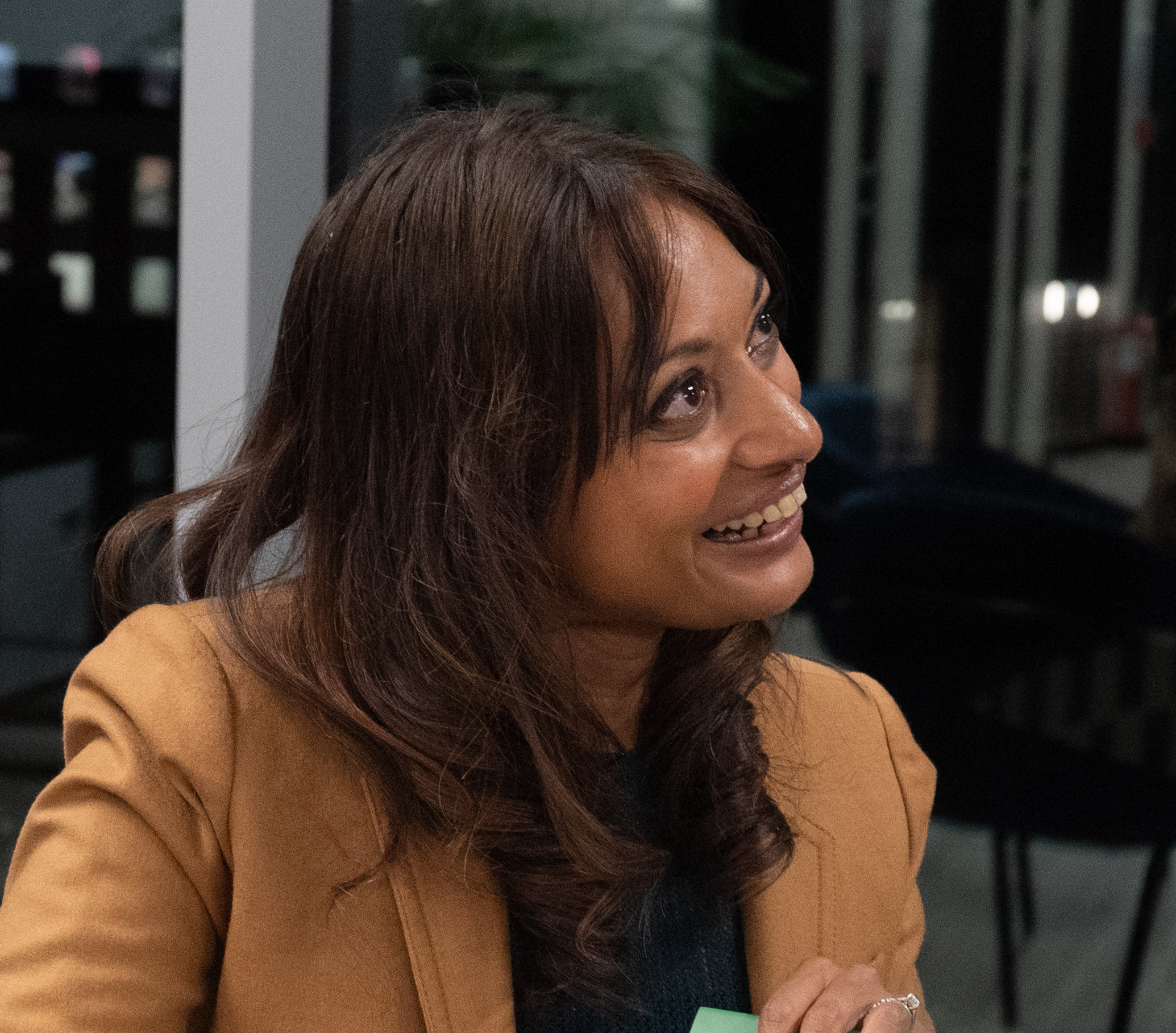
- David signing books at the 2024 St Andrew's Book Festival
- Born: London, England
- Education: Downing College, Cambridge
- Occupations: Economist; Broadcaster; Author
- Organizations: BBC

Dharshini David is an English broadcaster and author. She is currently the BBC's Deputy Economics Editor, having previously been an economist at HSBC Investment Bank and a presenter for Sky News. She also presents programmes for Radio 4.

== Early life ==
David was born and brought up in London. She was privately educated at the James Allen's Girls' School in Dulwich, South London, and read Economics at Downing College, Cambridge. She worked for independent think tank Oxford Economic Forecasting, for the UK's Government Economic Service, and for HSBC Investment Bank as its UK economist in London.

== Broadcasting career ==
David first joined the BBC in 2000 as an economics correspondent. She worked on national BBC1 bulletins, BBC News 24, and on its international counterpart BBC World. She also presented for the BBC's current affairs series Panorama, BBC One news and BBC Radio. She was appointed the BBC's New York Business Presenter in July 2006 and presented World Business Report from New York. and covered the emergence of the credit crunch from Wall Street.

In September 2009, she joined Sky News as a business and economics correspondent. She latterly presented business news bulletins and programmes for Sky, including the flagship business programmes "Jeff Randall Live" and "Business Live", and also presented "Sky News Tonight" and other general news programmes.

By 2018 David was back at BBC News as Senior Economics correspondent. In January 2020, she was appointed BBC News' first Global Trade Correspondent. She has presented the business news for the Today programme and occasionally acts as a main presenter for the programme. She was awarded the Wincott Prize for audio journalism in 2023 for her programme Is Britain the Sick Man of Europe

David was named an Officer of the Order of the British Empire in the 2025 New Year Honours.

== Writing ==
David's first book, The Almighty Dollar: Follow the Incredible Journey of a Single Dollar to See How the Global Economy Really Works, was published by Elliott & Thompson in February 2018.
