= Tanya Beckett =

English television and radio journalist

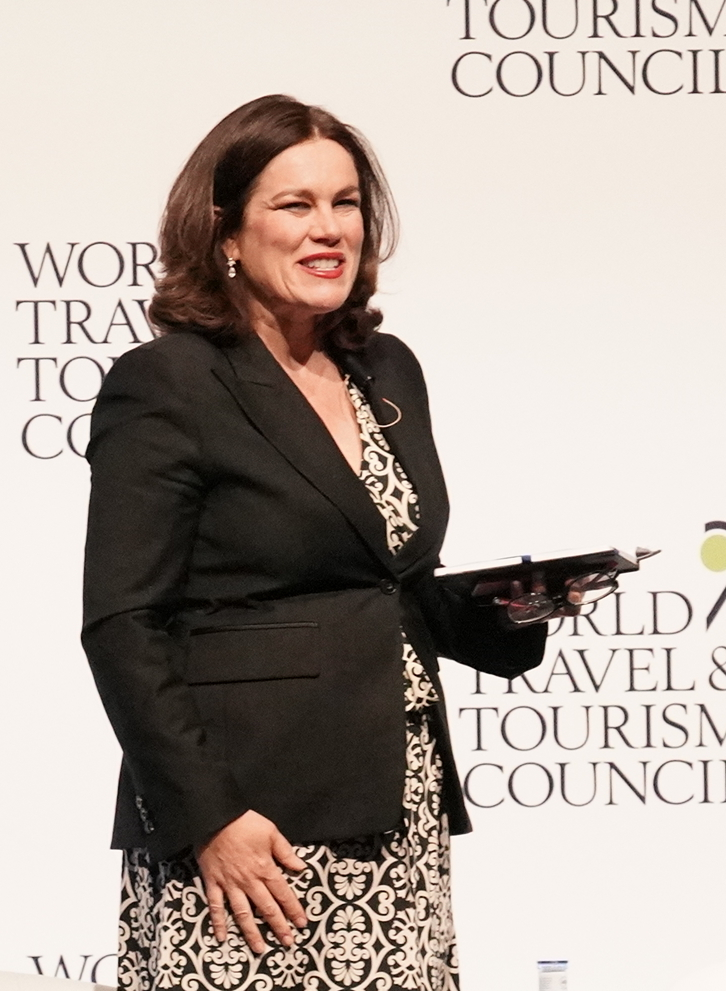
- Beckett in 2019
- Born: Tanya Louise Beckett; 11 July 1966 (age 59); Maldon, Essex, England
- Occupations: Chemist, investment banker, journalist, presenter, newsreader
- Years active: 1992–present
- Notable credit(s): CNBC Europe, NBC Europe, News Direct Radio 97.3, Sky News, CNN International, BBC News, Working Lunch, BBC Breakfast, BBC World News, BBC News Channel, World News Today.
- Spouse: Hon. Edward Charles d'Olier Gibson (16 September 2001 – present) Separated
- Children: 3
- Website: tanyabeckett.com

Tanya Louise Beckett (born 11 July 1966) is an English television and radio journalist.

== Early life ==
Beckett was born in 1966 in Maldon, Essex. She has one brother. She was educated at the independent Redland High School for Girls in Bristol, England, followed by Pembroke College, Oxford, where she gained a degree in metallurgy and materials science and a Blue in fencing.

== Career ==
Beckett undertook research on the properties of carbon and glass fibres for Courtaulds. She spent four years working as an investment banker for Citibank in London and Commerzbank in Frankfurt, Germany; consequently, she speaks fluent German and French.

After training as a journalist, Beckett joined CNBC Europe in 1993 as a business and political reporter. She spent her career presenting business news for broadcasters including NBC Europe and CNBC Europe, News Direct Radio 97.3 in London, Sky News and CNN International.

Beckett joined the BBC in June 1998. Since then, she has been a presenter for programmes such as BBC Two's Working Lunch in 1998, BBC Breakfast, The World Today on BBC One and, from 2001, BBC News Channel and BBC World News. Beckett moved her young family to New York City while helping to present the World Business Report from an office in Times Square, but returned to London three years later.

She presently works on the BBC World Service, as a relief presenter on the news channel and successor to World Business Report Business Today, as well as The World Today, and from June 2015 started to present Talking Business on the BBC News Channel. She also presents TV version of Witness a monthly highlights programme of stories told by the people who were there.

== Personal life ==
After studying together, and then meeting at a college reunion in 1998, on 16 September 2001 Beckett married the Hon. Edward Charles d'Olier Gibson (born 31 December 1967), son of and heir then apparent to Baron Ashbourne. The couple have three children. She lives in the village of Lewknor, Oxfordshire.

In November 2013, d'Olier Gibson appeared in Oxford magistrates' court after allegedly assaulting Beckett at their home during a discussion over their possible divorce. Beckett called the police, who in trying to restrain d'Olier Gibson used pepper spray and struck him with a baton. Having discovered a missing shotgun, he was eventually arrested after armed police were called to the property. d'Olier Gibson was charged with assaulting both Beckett and arresting officer PC Aaron Walker; he denied both charges. Convicted for his "sustained and drunken" attack on PC Walker, he was ordered to wear an electronic tag for two months and given a curfew. On release, d'Olier Gibson started divorce proceedings.
