= Samantha Simmonds =

English newsreader

- Born: Samantha Rose Simmonds; 1972 or 1973 (age 52–53); Bradford, England
- Occupations: Newsreader; journalist; television presenter
- Notable credits: Five News; BBC London News; Sky News; BBC World News; World News Today; Newsday; The Briefing; Business Briefing; World Business Report; Business Live; GMT; Impact; Global; BBC News; The Papers
- Spouse: Phillip Davies
- Children: 3
- Website: samanthasimmonds.co.uk

Samantha Rose Simmonds (born 1972 or 1973) is an English newsreader, television presenter and journalist. She was a news anchor for Sky News until July 2016. She returned to presenting for BBC News in March 2017.

== Early life ==
Simmonds was born to an Iranian mother and a Yorkshire-born father. Her mother moved to the United Kingdom in the 1960s. Simmonds grew up in the Alwoodley area of Leeds and attended Leeds Girls' High School. She studied for a BA at Liverpool University. Whilst a student in Liverpool, she appeared as a contestant on the ITV television show Blind Date.

== Journalism career ==
After gaining a postgraduate diploma in broadcast journalism from City University in London in 1995, Simmonds worked as a reporter for local radio in Yorkshire before moving to London for a job as a producer on Channel Five News. She was later a presenter on BBC Breakfast and spent two years reporting and presenting BBC London's news programmes before joining Sky News in 2005. While presenting that channel, she was the first British journalist to break the story of Michael Jackson's death. Simmonds left Sky News in 2016, along with several other anchors, as part of a cost-cutting exercise. She can now be seen presenting on BBC One, BBC World News and the BBC News Channel, which she joined in March 2017.

== Personal life ==
Simmonds is married to Phillip Davies, co-founder of Magway Ltd. They live in East Finchley, North London, and have three children.
