= Karin Giannone =

South African-born British newsreader (born 1974)

- Born: January 1974 (age 52); Johannesburg, South Africa
- Education: Newnham College, Cambridge
- Occupations: Journalist, News presenter
- Years active: 1997–present
- Employer: BBC
- Notable credit(s): Editor of Varsity; Anglia Television; Football Italia; Sky News; BBC World News; World News Today with Karin Giannone
- Spouse(s): Neil Rowbottom (m. 2002, divorced) Nick Buckley (m. 2022)
- Children: 3

Karin Thandi Giannone (/ˈkɑːrɪn dʒəˈnoʊni/ KAR-in jə-NOH-nee; born January 1974) is a South African-born British news presenter working in the United Kingdom. She is a London-based main presenter on the BBC News channel.

== Career ==
Giannone edited the student magazine Varsity magazine at Cambridge, which led to work experience at Anglia Television, and on graduation in 1997 she joined the regional ITV station in Norwich as a news trainee, producing, reporting and presenting for regional news bulletins. In 1999, her language and broadcasting skills helped her land a role as a reporter and presenter for Channel 4's Football Italia series, where she covered the Italian soccer scene for a season, flying between the UK and Italy every week. She returned to Anglia in 2000 as a presenter and reporter, this time for the programme for the east of the region covering Norfolk, Suffolk and Essex. She also followed troops from the region for a series of reports from Afghanistan in 2002.

Giannone then moved to London to present a variety of shifts for Sky News, before joining BBC News in 2005. Her work assignments have included a stint presenting World News Today on the BBC World News channel from Washington at 10:00 pm EST during July/August 2008.

She presented live coverage from South Africa following the death of Nelson Mandela in 2013.

From 3 March 2014, Giannone presented live coverage on the BBC News Channel at the trial of Oscar Pistorius in Pretoria, South Africa. She anchored the BBC's French presidential election coverage in 2017 from Paris, Italian elections in 2018 from Rome, and the Indian election from Delhi in 2019.

She was the regular presenter of BBC World News from 0700–1000 GMT Wednesdays and Thursdays, including programmes such as Worklife with Sally Bundock at 8:30 am in the UK, Friday 1600–1900, and Sunday 1800–2300 (including World News Today at 9:00 pm on the BBC News Channel).

On 2 February 2023, it was confirmed that Giannone – along with many other presenters of the domestic BBC News Channel – would lose their presenting roles as part of the BBC's relaunched news channel. In 2024, she was reappointed to the same slots 0700–0900 GMT Tuesday–Thursday and 1800–2300 GMT on alternate weekends, and as a relief presenter to the successor to World News Today, The World Today.

In March 2026, she presented her first weekday BBC News at One from Salford.

== Personal life ==
Giannone married Neil Rowbottom, a former head of virtual design at Anglia Television, on 13 April 2002 in Norwich. They have three children, a son and two daughters, and later divorced. She began dating Nick Buckley, then BBC news director in 2019. They married on 4 August 2022 in California. The couple live in Tunbridge Wells, Kent.

Media offices
Preceded by Philippa Thomas	Presenter of World News Today; 2014 – present	Succeeded by Incumbent
