= Outside Source =

British news programme

- Final title card on TV used in 2023.
- Also known as: Outside Source; Outside Source with Ros Atkins (TV); BBC OS (Radio)
- Created by: BBC World News
- Presented by: Ros Atkins; Mark Lowen (radio)
- Country of origin: United Kingdom
- Original language: English

Production
- Production locations: Broadcasting House, Central London
- Running time: 90 minutes (TV); 120 minutes (radio)

Original release
- Network: BBC World News; BBC News; BBC World Service
- Release: 17 February 2014 – 30 March 2023 (TV)

Related
- World Have Your Say; World News Today

Outside Source is a radio news programme broadcast on the BBC World Service and mainly presented by James Reynolds. It was also the name of a television programme that utilised social media in the presentation of its stories. It was usually presented by BBC analysis editor Ros Atkins on BBC News and BBC World News until its cancellation in March 2023.

Outside Source replaced a standard edition of BBC World News, which originally was an edition of World News Today. In the UK it replaced the BBC News at Nine along with World News Today on Friday and weekends. Normally between 23 December and 1 January Outside Source is replaced by an edition of World News Today at 19:00 on BBC World News and at 21:00 on the BBC News Channel.

According to the BBC, "Outside Source aims to open up the news process, enabling people to discover the latest on the stories that matter to them. An hour-long World Service Radio show is the first element of the pan-Global News format to be brought to air."

The programme aired for the final time on domestic BBC News channel and BBC World News on 30 March 2023.

== History ==
The programme was launched on BBC World Service on 28 October 2013; and on BBC World News on 17 February 2014. It began being broadcast in the UK on 1 June 2015, though it has been broadcast during major stories in the past. In March 2017 the radio programme was renamed BBC OS. In 2017, the radio programme was moved to 16:00 GMT to go out at the same time as the TV version. But in July, this was changed to 19:00 GMT to allow an edition of World News Today to be broadcast at 19:00 UK Time.

In 2020, Atkins developed with the OS team a series of short ten minute explainers called Ros Atkins On... which are designed to work on TV, radio and online, airing on BBC One during Breakfast, BBC News at Nine and social media. These have covered topics from COVID, Partygate which went viral, to 2021 Abu Dhabi Grand Prix.

On 30 March 2020, the format of the programme was drastically changed as a result of the COVID-19 pandemic moving from the balcony studio overlooking the newsroom into Studio C, where BBC World News is based, whilst Broadcasting House was operating with a reduced staffing capacity for social distancing. It's expected that the programme will return to the balcony on 21 June for the first time since the beginning of the pandemic, after Ros Atkins had announced on Twitter that the 17th June show would be the last one from Studio C. Although the touchscreen itself, which has formed a major part of OS since it first launched in 2014, will not be returning as part of the main format, with Atkins stating in a Twitter reply, "I'm afraid it's time has come (on OS at least)." It's not yet known what the new format will look like when Outside Source returns to the balcony, though it has been teased by Atkins that they have "worked on something new" and that he's "excited to start using it from Monday."

Outside Source had continued to broadcast on the BBC News Channel, BBC World News and PBS (in the United States) during lockdown, despite other specialised and uniquely branded programmes on BBC News having gone off air since the start of the pandemic.

On the 18 August 2020, the programme was moved to 18:00 GMT / 19:00 BST swapping places with the programme formerly called Beyond 100 Days. It ran for 90 minutes on BBC World News and BBC News Channel while OS on the World Service runs for 120 minutes.

On 13 January 2022, McGovern announced on Twitter that she would leave OS on the World Service to become a news presenter on BBC World News. However, had since become the main relief presenter for the TV version.

The final televised episode of the program aired on 30 March 2023.

== United States ==
Outside Source broadcast on most PBS in the United States at 18:30 to 19:00 Eastern Time, although air times varied on each PBS member stations. The programme also launched on 1 January 2020 replacing Nightly Business Report with the series finale ending a 40-year run.

== Presenters ==
The remaining original edition shown on BBC News and BBC World News was presented by:

Years	Presenter	Current role
2014–2023	Ros Atkins	Main presenter
2014–2023	Nuala McGovern	Main relief presenter
2014–2023	Karin Giannone	relief presenter
2014–2023	Kasia Madera	
2018–2023	Krupa Padhy	Radio Presenter
2018–2023	Lewis Vaughan Jones	
2020–2023	Maryam Moshiri	
2021–2023	James Reynolds	
2022–2023	Nancy Kacungira	
2014–2023	Philippa Thomas	
