= Lukwesa Burak =

British television presenter

- Born: 1974 or 1975 (age 51–52); Ndola, Zambia
- Occupations: Weather anchor, News anchor
- Employer: BBC
- Notable credit(s): East Midlands Today; Al Jazeera English; BBC News; BBC World News; World News Today; Newsday; Focus on Africa

Lukwesa Burak (/lʊˈkwɛsə ˈbjɜːræk/ luu-KWESS-ə BYUR-ak; born 1974 or 1975) is a news presenter and former weather presenter for BBC News in the UK. Previously, she worked for Al Jazeera English, Sky News and before that Africa Edition on eNCA (formerly known as eNews Channel), based in South Africa. She was formerly a weather forecaster and then news presenter in the United Kingdom, for East Midlands Today, a regional television news programme covering the Midlands area of Central England, followed by news presenter for Sky News, the 24-hour television news service operated by Sky Television, part of British Sky Broadcasting, based in London.

She became a news presenter for eNCA in August 2012. She is a regular presenter of Newsday on BBC World News, BBC One, and the BBC News Channel in London with Sharanjit Leyl in Singapore and also on Focus on Africa on BBC World News and World News Today on BBC Four, BBC World News and the BBC News Channel on as well as mornings, afternoons and evenings on Saturdays and Sundays.

== Early life ==
Burak was born in Ndola, Zambia, and is named after her royal tribal family. Her father is of Zambian and Greek heritage, her mother is of Zimbabwean and Portuguese heritage and her stepfather is Polish. She enjoyed animals and had a spider collection. After a boat capsized on a fishing trip with her father on the Zambezi river, she was hospitalised for four weeks, having caught malaria.

Burak spent her early childhood in Triangle, Zimbabwe, where she attended Murray MacDougall Junior School, before she moved to England when she was eight years old and lived in Guiseley, West Yorkshire and attended Menston Primary School and St Mary's Catholic High School in Menston. She had an interest in flying, so joined the Royal Air Force Air Training Corps, but had to leave after injuring her leg during a game of football. She gained a bachelor's degree in Geography and European Studies at the University of Sussex, when she spent a year in Switzerland and learned to speak French. She was then awarded a European Union scholarship to complete a Master of Science degree at the University of Leicester.

== Broadcasting career ==
After three years in an information technology career, Burak started her media career as a broadcast assistant for BBC Weather, and trained as a broadcast meteorologist during this time. She began broadcasting as a relief forecaster for BBC regions and nations, eventually joining BBC East Midlands as one of their permanent forecast team, before becoming the lunchtime news anchor.

=== Sky News ===
Burak moved to Sky News in 2006. Her main role involved presenting Sky News overnight, with her typical shift starting at midnight ending at 06:00. During this time she presented Sky News on the Hour from 01:00 to 03:00 and then Sky World News from 03:00 to 06:00, which caters for audiences within Europe, Asia and Africa. She left Sky News in 2012, but returned in 2013.

=== International broadcasting ===
In August 2012, Burak joined eNCA (eNews Channel Africa), based in South Africa. She said that she had to relocate to South Africa as her husband had been offered a new job there, but that she was very much looking forward to the opportunity to join the channel's Africa Edition team and to have the opportunity to conduct live interviews rather than dealing with predominantly pre-recorded material. But of her former employers, Sky News, she said: "Sky is an experience I would recommend to anybody. When you are working at that level in the industry, you could not ask for anything else." Burak rejoined Sky News in 2013 before departing once more in June 2015. She joined the team of Al Jazeera English in Doha.

=== Return to BBC ===
In May 2016 Burak returned to BBC News, joining BBC East Midlands and BBC World News. She began presenting on the BBC News Channel on 13 August 2016. In September Burak became the main presenter of Inside Out East Midlands and the relaunched England edition, which is a weekly round-up of the three best reports from across the country.

Burak went on to anchor the BBC World News channel in London.

== Other interests ==
Burak was portrayed on the cover of Issue 2 of UK Zambians' Lifestyle Magazine in the summer of 2008. She was also appointed patron of the charity All Star Kids (1079911) at the start of December 2008. She is an ambassador for Malaria No More UK, as a result of her own personal experiences as a child. Since January 2011, she has been the director of hair products company Gidore which she founded.

== Personal life ==
Burak is married with two children. She lives in the village of Braybrooke, Northamptonshire.
