= Jonathan Josephs =

British journalist

Jonathan Josephs (born 1983) is a journalist who was the first presenter to anchor a BBC News programme whilst wearing a kippah, a Jewish skullcap. His breakthrough came on New Year's Eve 2021 when the regular presenter went home sick. He said that "the BBC is a place full of diversity and I am happy to be part of that".

== Career ==
Josephs is a business reporter who cover global business and economic news for BBC on television, radio and online. He regularly interviews major CEOs, politicians and policymakers. He has reported from countries include France, Israel, Morocco and Singapore and often writes about subjects including the US China trade war, the economics of conflict in the Middle East, shipping and energy.

He has also presented programmes on the BBC World Service including The Interview and Business Daily.

In 2024 he was part of a team that won an award at the Aerospace Media Awards for a programme looking at the future of air travel.
