= Juliet Dunlop =

Scottish freelance broadcast journalist

- Born: Scotland
- Presenting career
- Style: News anchor/journalist
- Country: Scotland
- Previous shows: BBC News; STV News

Juliet Dunlop is a Scottish freelance broadcast journalist. She previously appeared as a presenter for BBC News and STV News. She left the BBC in 2011. She took time out of her role in news reporting to embark on a journey as an English teacher in Inveralmond Community High School, Livingston. This was very short lived, and Dunlop returned to the news career. She currently works as a correspondent for ITV's breakfast programme Good Morning Britain.

== Career ==
Before joining the BBC News channel in 2008, Dunlop fronted the interactive news headlines for the BBC's red button news service. She also presented daytime news updates on BBC One.

Dunlop joined STV in April 2011 as the main anchor for its new Edinburgh-based edition of the regional news programme STV News at Six, which launched a month later. She also presents the weekday late bulletin for the East sub-region. Prior to the launch of the Edinburgh service, Dunlop co-anchored the station's overnight coverage of the Scottish Parliamentary elections in May 2011, alongside Bernard Ponsonby. She left STV during the spring of 2013.

In June 2013, Dunlop joined The Scotsman as a columnist. She has also stood in for the Radio Scotland programme, Call Kaye. She is now back on BBC Scotland.
