= Lina Sinjab =

Syrian BBC television journalist

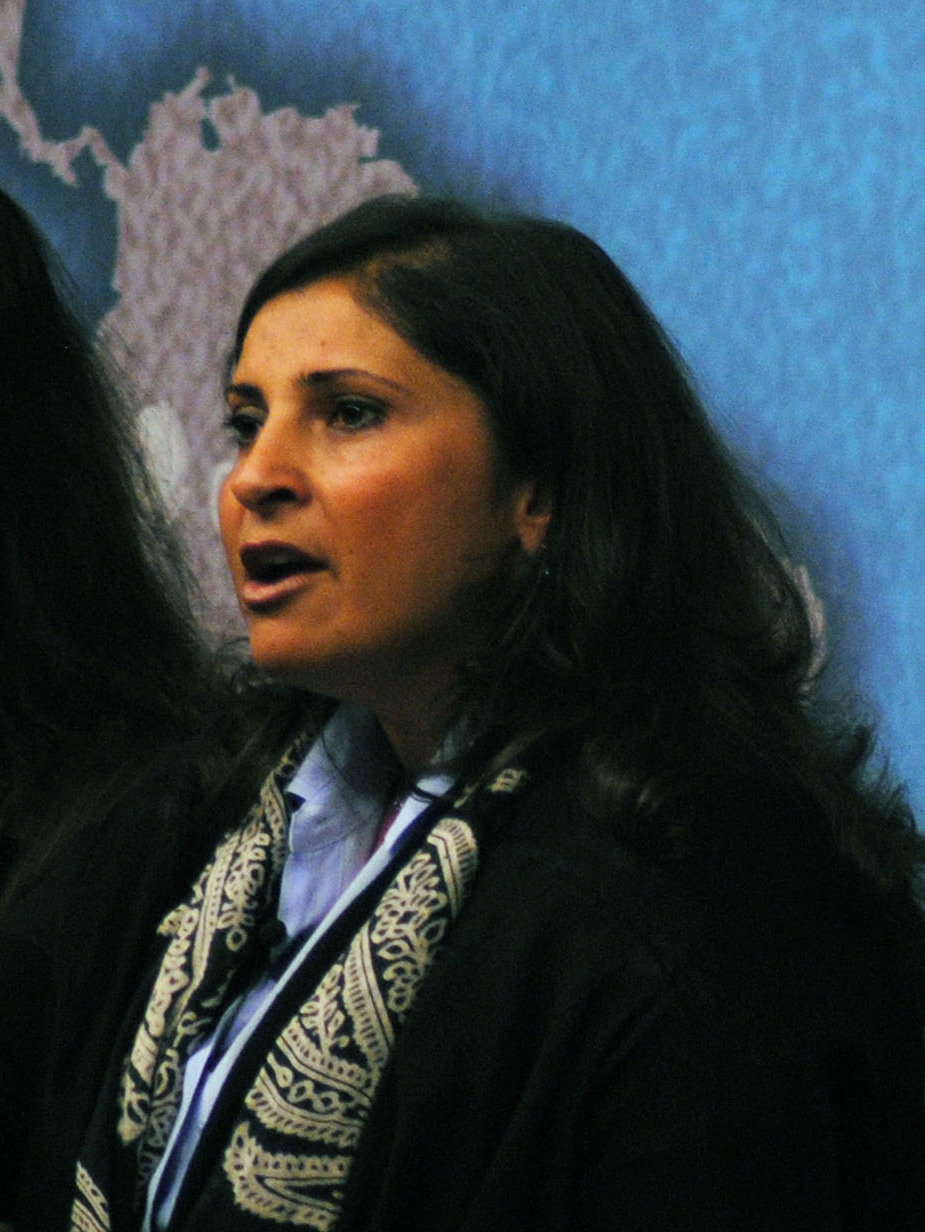
- Occupation(s): Journalist, Filmmaker
- Employer: BBC

Lina Sinjab is a Syrian journalist based in Lebanon, who is a Middle East correspondent for the BBC.

She served as the BBC Syria correspondent until 2013, when she was forced to leave the country after threats from the government.

== Early life ==
Sinjab graduated from Damascus University with a degree in English. After studying law at Beirut Arab University, she attended SOAS University of London, where she received an MA in international politics.
