= Michelle Fleury =

British journalist (born 1971)

- Born: 1971 (age 54–55)
- Education: University of Warwick
- Occupation: BBC business correspondent

Michelle Fleury (born 1971) is a journalist who is the BBC's New York business correspondent and a reporter for BBC World News. In 2019, she co-hosted the BBC News programme Beyond 100 Days with Christian Fraser while Katty Kay had a three month sabbatical.

== Career ==
Fleury has covered American business and economics for more than 10 years and regularly reports live from the floor of the New York Stock Exchange on financial markets.

As well as speaking at conferences, Fleury has presented a variety of general news programmes on BBC World News, including World News America and half-hour, business-focused special programming such as Working Lives.

== Personal life ==
Fleury was born in London in 1971 and graduated from Warwick University. She lives in Brooklyn, New York.
