= Lucy Hockings =

New Zealand journalist (born 1974)

- Born: Lucy Mary Hockings; 7 March 1974 (age 52); Taranaki, New Zealand
- Education: University of Auckland
- Occupations: Chief News Presenter; Moderator; Events host Media trainer
- Employer: BBC/BBC News
- Notable credit(s): Live with Lucy Hockings; GMT; Impact; BBC News Now

Lucy Mary Hockings is a New Zealand news presenter for the BBC. She is one of the chief presenters broadcasting worldwide and across the UK. She is also a moderator, events host and media trainer.

Her roles previously included anchoring Live with Lucy Hockings on BBC World News. Since the merger in 2023 of the BBC News channel and BBC World News, Lucy Hockings currently anchors BBC News Now and on rota BBC Weekend News on BBC One.

== Early life, education and early career ==
Hockings was born on 7 March 1974 in Taranaki in New Zealand's North Island. She attended Kristin School in Albany on Auckland's North Shore. She has a degree in journalism from the University of Auckland. Prior to joining the BBC, Hockings worked as a reporter for TVNZ.

== BBC ==
Hockings joined the BBC as a producer in 1999, before being promoted to senior producer in 2000. As a reporter, Hockings covered the September 11 attacks, the Afghanistan and Iraq wars, the 2004 Indian Ocean tsunami, the death of Pope John Paul II, the 2005 London bombings and the capture of Saddam Hussein. During her earlier presenting days, Hockings said her employers made attempts to "iron out" her accent, and that she was sent to the Royal Academy of Dramatic Art for "unsuccessful" elocution lessons. In April 2023, when a new BBC news channel was launched for both UK and international viewers, Hockings became a chief presenter.

Hockings sometimes presented Newsnight on BBC2 from 2026.

== Films ==
Hockings appeared as a news anchor in the 2018 film Black Panther.

== Family ==
Hockings is married to Jason Breckenridge, a Canadian film-maker. They live in Hackney, East London and have two children.

Hockings' elder brother Liam, who was also a journalist, died in the 2023 Loafers Lodge fire.
