= Christian Fraser =

British journalist

- Born: Christian James Fraser; 13 November 1973 (age 52); Burnley, England
- Education: Leeds Metropolitan University
- Occupations: News Correspondent; writer; broadcaster
- Employers: BBC (2000–present); Trinity Mirror (1995–2000)
- Spouse: Topaz Amoore
- Children: 2
- Website: christian-fraser.com

Christian James Fraser (born 13 November 1973) is an English journalist, newsreader, writer and broadcaster, specialising in news and current affairs, who is a BBC News senior news correspondent and chief presenter. He presents The Context.

Fraser was a long-time foreign correspondent for the BBC based in Nairobi, Rome, Cairo, and Paris. He is currently the BBC's Senior News Correspondent, and based in London presenting on major international stories. Since 2017, he has co-hosted Beyond 100 Days alongside Katty Kay broadcast at 7pm on BBC World News worldwide, the BBC News Channel and BBC Four in the UK.

== Early life ==
Fraser was born in Burnley, Lancashire. He attended Queen Elizabeth's Grammar School, Blackburn. He graduated with a degree in Spanish and Business Studies from Leeds Metropolitan University. After working in a hotel, Fraser became interested in journalism and took a National Council for the Training of Journalists (NCTJ) course in Newcastle.

== Career ==
Fraser joined Trinity Mirror in 1995 as a trainee reporter, working for the Sunday Mirror and the Daily Mirror. He became a staff correspondent on the Daily Mirror in 1996 before joining the BBC in 2000. Fraser began his professional broadcasting career as an investigative reporter for BBC Radio 5 Live. In 2002 and 2003 he reported on the wars in Afghanistan and Iraq.

In 2005 he was posted to Nairobi, where he reported on conflicts in the Democratic Republic of the Congo and southern Sudan. In the summer of 2006 he moved to Rome, where he was the BBC's correspondent for almost two years. A year later he moved to Cairo. Fraser was the only British correspondent inside Gaza in 2007 during the Israeli invasion, Operation Cast Lead. He spent a week in the Palestinian city of Rafah.

In 2010 Fraser covered the revolution in Egypt for BBC TV and was appointed that year as the BBC's correspondent in Paris. In 2011 he reported on the war in Libya, first from the rebel held Benghazi and then from Tripoli as the war dragged on. In 2014 he returned to London as the BBC News Channel's Senior News Correspondent. He now presents for the BBC News Channel, BBC World News, BBC Breakfast and Radio 4's PM programme.

In 2022, he became the main presenter of the BBC News programme The Context with Christian Fraser. He also presented the overnight coverage following the death of Queen Elizabeth II as well as some of the days leading up to the funeral. In February 2023 it was announced Fraser would become a chief presenter on the BBC's new news channel for both UK and international viewers due to launch in April.

== Personal life ==
Fraser is married to Topaz Amoore, a journalist who was foreign editor at The Daily Telegraph before being promoted to assistant editor. They have two children and live in Barnes, London. He supports Burnley F.C.
