= BBC News (international TV channel) =

English-language pay television channel

- Logo used since 2023
- Country: United Kingdom
- Broadcast area: Worldwide (except the UK)
- Network: BBC News
- Headquarters: Broadcasting House

Programming
- Language: English
- Picture format: 1080i HDTV

Ownership
- Owner: BBC Studios (BBC Global News Ltd)
- Sister channels: See list

History
- Launched: 26 January 1995; 31 years ago
- Former names: BBC World (1995–2008); BBC World News (2008–2023)

Links
- Website: www.bbc.com

BBC News is an international English-language pay television channel owned by BBC Global News Ltd. – a subsidiary of BBC Studios – and operated by the BBC News division of the BBC. The network carries news bulletins, documentaries, and other factual programmes; it broadcasts from studios in London, Washington, D.C., and Singapore.

Launched on 11 March 1991 as BBC World Service Television outside Europe, its name was changed to BBC World on 26 January 1995 and to BBC World News on 21 April 2008. On 3 April 2023, the channel's programming and talent was consolidated with the BBC News channel in the UK as part of a restructuring; both channels are now branded as BBC News, and are structured to use a common schedule with domestic opt-outs for UK-specific news coverage and programmes.

Unlike the BBC's domestic channels, it is funded by subscription and advertising revenues, and not by the United Kingdom television licence. As such, it is not broadcast in the UK directly, although selected programmes and bulletins had been carried on the domestic BBC News channel (especially during overnight hours), and vice versa (including domestic programmes such as Click and HARDtalk, and during breaking news and special events in the UK) even prior to the consolidation.

According to the BBC, the combined seven channels of the Global News operations have the largest audience market share among all its rivals, with an estimated 99 million viewers weekly in 2016–2017, part of the estimated 121 million weekly audience of all its operations.

== History ==
Logo used from 2008 to 2019

Logo used from 2019 to 2022

Logo used from 2022 to 2023

Rolling news began in the UK on 5 February 1989 when Sky News was launched and on 26 January 1995, the BBC launched an international news channel BBC World. However it was meant for global audiences and normally wasn't available to viewers in the UK. In May 1996, the BBC announced that it was to launch a UK rolling news service as part of its move into digital broadcasting.

BBC News 24 went on air on 9 November 1997, nearly a year before digital television was launched in the UK and due to a lack of space on satellite, the channel was only available on cable, with an overnight shop window on BBC One when that channel was not on air. However, Sky News had complained about the costs associated with running a channel that only a minority could view from the licence fee. Sky News claimed that a number of British cable operators had been incentivised to carry News 24 (which, as a licence-fee funded channel was made available to such operators for free) in preference to the commercial Sky News. However, in September 1999 the European Commission ruled against a complaint made by Sky News that the publicly funded channel was unfair and illegal under EU law. The Commission ruled that the licence fee should be considered state aid but that such aid was justified due to the public service remit of the BBC and that it did not exceed actual costs.

The advent of digital television in the United Kingdom in autumn 1998 saw the channel launch on Sky's new digital satellite service and a month later it started to broadcast via digital terrestrial television. Initially it was difficult to obtain a digital satellite or terrestrial receiver without a subscription to Sky or ONdigital respectively, but following the demise of ITV Digital in 2002 and the subsequent launch of Freeview, the channel started to become much more widely available and the BBC Governors' annual report for 2005/2006 reported that average audience figures for fifteen-minute periods had reached 8.6% in multichannel homes. The 2004 report also claimed that the channel outperformed Sky News in both weekly and monthly reach in multichannel homes for the January 2004 period, and for the first time in two years moved ahead of Sky News in being perceived as the channel best for news.

In 2005, the Head of television news Peter Horrocks outlined plans to provide more funding and resources for the channel and shift the corporation's emphasis regarding news away from the traditional BBC One bulletins and across to the rolling news channel. The introduction of simulcasts of the main bulletins on the channel was to allow the news bulletins to pool resources rather than work against each other at key times in the face of competition, particularly from Sky News.

The channel relocated, along with the remaining BBC News services at Television Centre, to the newly refurbished Broadcasting House on 18 March 2013 at 13:00 GMT. Presentation and on-screen graphics were refreshed, with new full HD studios and a live newsroom backdrop. Moving cameras in the newsroom form part of the top of the hour title sequence and are used at the start of weather bulletins.

=== BBC News HD ===
As a result of the move to Broadcasting House, BBC News gained new studios and equipment to be able to broadcast in high-definition. On 5 August 2013, the international feed of BBC News was offered as a High Definition (HD) feed across the Middle East when it launched its international HD channel on the Arab Satellite Communications Organization. Arabsat was the BBC's first distribution partner in the Middle East to offer the channel in HD. On 1 April 2015, the then-named BBC World News Channel started broadcasting in high definition on the 11.229 GHz/V transponder on Astra 1KR at the 19.2°E orbital position, available free-to-air to viewers with 60 cm dishes across Europe and coastal North Africa.

On 16 July 2013, the BBC announced that a high-definition (HD) simulcast of BBC News would be launched by early 2014. HD output from BBC News has been simulcast on BBC One HD and BBC Two HD since the move to Broadcasting House in March 2013. The channel launched on 10 December 2013 (at an earlier date than originally planned) and rolled out nationwide over the next six months (as did BBC Four HD, CBBC HD and CBeebies HD).

BBC News HD was removed from Freeview on 30 June 2022 due to the closure of the COM7 multiplex. There are HD versions of BBC News on BBC iPlayer, Freesat channel 200, Sky channel 503, and Virgin Media channel 601.

=== 2008 rebranding ===
On 21 April 2008, BBC News 24 was renamed "BBC News" on the channel itself, and referred to as the "BBC News Channel" on other BBC services. This was part of the Creative Futures plan, launched in 2006, to bring all BBC News output under the single brand name.

The BBC News Channel moved from the Studio N8 set, which became home to BBC World News, to what was the home of the national news in Studio N6, allowing the channel to share its set with the BBC News at One and the BBC News at Ten – with other bulletins moving to Studio TC7.

=== Consolidation with BBC News (UK domestic version) ===
On 26 May 2022, as part of planned cuts and streamlining across the broadcaster, the BBC announced plans for consolidation of the domestic BBC News channel in the UK with BBC World News. The domestic and international versions would share content, while maintaining the ability to opt out from the shared feed for domestic coverage if warranted. The BBC promoted that the service would offer "new flagship programmes built around high-profile journalists, and programmes commissioned for multiple platforms".

The BBC announced a new presenter line-up for the merged service in February 2023, led by Matthew Amroliwala, Christian Fraser, Yalda Hakim, Lucy Hockings, and Maryam Moshiri. On 3 April 2023, the BBC World News channel rebranded as BBC News, formally marking the implementation of the unified service with the UK feed opting out for UK-specific programming, such as BBC television newscasts and Newsnight, and coverage of UK-specific news not judged to be significant enough to warrant rolling coverage globally. Overall, the changes resulted in the layoffs of about 50 employees, including presenters David Eades, Joanna Gosling, and Tim Willcox.

Yalda Hakim left the channel to join Sky News in September 2023, meaning that Maryam Moshiri could have her own programme in the slot of Hakim's former Daily Global programme.

In February 2024, Ben Brown, Geeta Guru-Murthy, and Anita McVeigh rejoined the news channel after a year off air as chief presenters.

During the 2024 general election campaign, BBC News temporarily unwound the unified service, and reverted to broadcasting a domestic feed of rolling coverage from 9 a.m. to 8 p.m. daily, as well as an additional UK-specific bulletin at 11 p.m. following Newsnight. This continued through the State Opening of Parliament, after which the prior schedule was reinstated beginning 18 July. The 11 p.m. bulletin remained until October 2024, when it was replaced with World News America. In January 2025, the UK feed dropped its simulcast of BBC Breakfast as a pilot, with world feed programming now carried in its timeslot; executive news editor Paul Royall considered the simulcast redundant, citing that the majority of its viewership came from BBC One and iPlayer.

== Broadcasting ==
Live news output originates from studios B, C and E in Broadcasting House with some recorded programming from Broadcasting House studios A and D and the BBC Millbank studio, as well as Manchester, Nairobi, Singapore and Washington, D.C. The BBC News newsroom is now part of the new consolidated BBC Newsroom in Broadcasting House along with BBC World Service and UK domestic news services.

Previously, the channel was broadcast in 4:3, with the news output fitted into a 14:9 frame for both digital and analogue broadcasting, resulting in black bands at the top and bottom of the screen. On 13 January 2009 at 09:57 GMT, the then-named BBC World News switched its broadcast to 16:9 format, initially in Europe on the Astra 1L satellite, and then, from 20 January 2009, on the Eutelsat Hot Bird 6 satellite which fed other broadcast feeds in the Asian region. The channel ceased broadcasting on analogue satellite on 18 April 2006.

BBC World News was named Best International News Channel at the Association for International Broadcasting Awards in November 2006. It won a Peabody Award in 2007 for White Horse Village and another in 2009 for Where Giving Life is a Death Sentence.

=== Worldwide ===
The channel is available in the US as part of Sling's World News add-on package. The international feed of BBC News was available on LiveStation from 2012 until the platform closed in 2016, along with the UK simulcast. The channel was added to various free ad-supported streaming television (FAST) platforms in the United States, including Pluto TV, Xumo Play, Samsung TV Plus, and Sling Freestream, in March 2024. Apart from advertising, the FAST version of the channel is identical to the version already available through traditional U.S. cable and satellite providers.

BBC News claims to be watched by a weekly audience of 74 million in over 200 countries and territories worldwide. BBC News is most commonly watched as a free-to-air (FTA) channel. The channel is available in Europe and many parts of the world via subscription television providers in cable, satellite, IPTV and streaming platforms.

In the United States, the channel is available through providers such as Cablevision, Comcast, Spectrum, Verizon Fios, and U-verse TV. As of 2023, the American distribution and advertising sales for the channel are handled by AMC Networks, who own and operate BBC America under license from the BBC.

In addition, BBC News syndicates its daytime and evening news programmes to public television stations throughout the US, originally maintaining a distribution partnership with Garden City, New York-based WLIW that lasted from 1998 until October 2008, when the BBC and WLIW mutually decided not to renew the contract. BBC News subsequently entered into an agreement with Community Television of Southern California, Inc., in which Los Angeles PBS member station KCET (which was a public independent station from 2011 to 2018) would take over distribution rights to BBC World News America (the KCET agreement has since been extended to encompass a half-hour simulcast of the 90-minute-long midday news bulletin GMT, which airs in the US as a morning show, and a weekly edition of the BBC news-magazine Newsnight).

Since June 2019, the distribution of the programme has been handled by Washington, D.C. PBS member WETA, which also produces other networked news and public affairs programmes such as the PBS NewsHour and Washington Week. PBS separately began distributing another programme aired by the channel, Beyond 100 Days, as a tape-delayed late night broadcast on 2 January 2018, as an interim replacement for Charlie Rose. Unlike GMT and BBC World News America, Beyond 100 Days is distributed exclusively to PBS member stations as part of the service's base schedule.

China banned BBC News in 2021, although access had already been heavily restricted before then and what was carried was censored, with parts of the show being blacked out by censors operating live. It was banned because of its coverage of the persecution of Uyghur people in China and in retaliation for CGTN being banned from the British market for violating national broadcast regulations.

=== United Kingdom ===
The TV platforms in the UK (i.e. Freeview, Sky, BT TV, Freesat, Virgin) do not officially offer the international feed of BBC News as a standalone full-time channel because it carries, and is funded by, advertising. (The BBC's domestic channels are funded by a television licence fee which households and establishments that want to watch television programmes as they are being broadcast must pay). However, it can be easily received due to its free-to-air status on many European satellite systems, including Astra and Hot Bird, and is available in selected London hotels. The UK's TV platforms, however, do provide the UK feed of BBC News channel, which carries much of the same programming. The international feed of BBC News can also be viewed in the public areas of Broadcasting House (in the lobby and café).

However, some programmes are officially available to UK audiences through the channel's UK feed. Such programmes air on the BBC's domestic channels, and some are available on demand on the BBC's iPlayer. From 00:00 to 05:00 UK time, the top-of-the-hour news bulletins are broadcast on both the UK and international feeds of the channel. At 01:30 on weekdays, Asia Business Report and Sport Today also air on both channels. There is a simulcast of the 05:00 UK edition of The Briefing and Business Briefing on BBC One and the BBC News channel. This programme was previously branded as The World Today (later a generic BBC World News bulletin) and World Business Report respectively. At 08:30 UK time, Worklife airs on the BBC News Channel. BBC News also produces a version of Outside Source at 21:00 UK time Monday–Thursday (shown on the BBC News Channel), World News Today at 19:00 Monday–Friday (shown on BBC Four), and 21:00 Friday–Sunday (shown on the BBC News Channel). World News Today replaced The World, which had been broadcast as a simulcast on BBC Four between 2002 and 2007.

The COVID-19 pandemic saw an increase of simulcasts between BBC News and BBC World News with simulcasting running through the morning (10:00 to 11:00) that was also shared with BBC Two, and the evening (19:00 to 20:00 & 12:00 to 22:00). The additional simulcasting was made permanent in August 2020. Consequently, the two channels now simulcast every day from 10:00 to 11:00; on weekdays from 19:00 to 06:00, apart from the BBC News at Ten and for an hour at 20:00; and between 21:00 to 06:00, apart from the evening BBC One bulletin, over the weekend.

The BBC implemented a wider consolidation of the networks' lineups in April 2023.

== Programming ==
Live news programmes:

- BBC News – International news.
- BBC World News America – news and analysis of the day's main US, UK and global stories. Broadcast from the BBC's Washington D.C. studio.
- The Context with Christian Fraser in London reports on international news, with a focus on the UK, Europe and the US (previously called 100 Days, 100 Days +, Beyond 100 Days and BBC News with Katy and Christian).
- Focus on Africa – BBC News's flagship African news programme, with news, business and sport from the continent.
- Newsnight – A current affairs programme presented by Victoria Derbyshire and Faisal Islam
- Newsday – Live from Singapore, news and analysis from both an Asian and global perspective.
- BBC Weekend News – National and international news and sport from London. Broadcast from 05:00 – 09:00am on Sunday simulcast on BBC One and BBC Two.
- Sunday with Laura Kuenssberg – Interviews and analysis of the week's news from the UK and around the world, including interviews with politicians and personalities from all walks of life.
- Verified Live – Analysing and fact-checking the truth behind the news based on available data and facts.
- BBC News Now – fast-moving breaking news with live interviews and reactions.
- The World Today – The best of the BBC's global journalism, as well as interviews with leading figures from the arts, culture and entertainment.

Live business and sports programmes:

- BBC Sportsday – International sports news and results.
- Business Today – The latest business news.

Pre-recorded programmes:

- 100 Women
- Tech Now – Technology programme aimed at non-technical audiences.
- Global Eye & Eye Investgations – Investigations by the world service specialist investigations team across the world, the main one being BBC Africa EyeExtended versions air under Eye Investgations banner.
- Panorama – Current affairs programme, featuring interviews and investigative reports on a wide variety of subjects.
- Reporters – Weekly reports from the BBC's correspondents.
- Talking Business – Examining business stories and economic trends.
- Talking Movies – A look at the latest developments in the global film industry.
- The Travel Show
- The Media Show – A global, topical weekly show on the entertainment and news business.
- Unspun World with John Simpson – world affairs editor, John Simpson, brings his experience and expertise to bear on the most important international stories. In discussion with the BBC's unparalleled range of experts across the world
- This Cultural Life – In-depth conversations with some of the world's leading artists and creatives across theatre, visual arts, music, dance, film and more.
- The President's Path – A weekly discussion on the US presidency with BBC US political correspondents and Caitríona Perry and Sumi Somaskanda.
- The Security Brief – Former Senior Officer in the British Military, Mikey Kay, unpacks global conflicts and security threats, offering clear, compelling analysis of the events and decisions shaping today's uncertain world.

Former programmes:

- The Briefing – Sally Bundock with news, business, and sport.
- Dateline London – Foreign correspondents based in London discussing the week's international news.
- Global – International news and analysis.
- Live – International news, including business and sport.
- Impact – Global news as it affected audiences in Asia.
- Outside Source – Discussion and analysis of news topics.
- Worklife
- World News Today – A daily news programme with in-depth analysis. Focus on the UK, Europe, the Middle East and Africa. Presenters included Nancy Kacungira, Karin Giannone, Kasia Madera, Alpa Patel and Philippa Thomas.
- Asia Business Report – Live from Singapore.
- World Business Report

=== BBC News bulletins ===
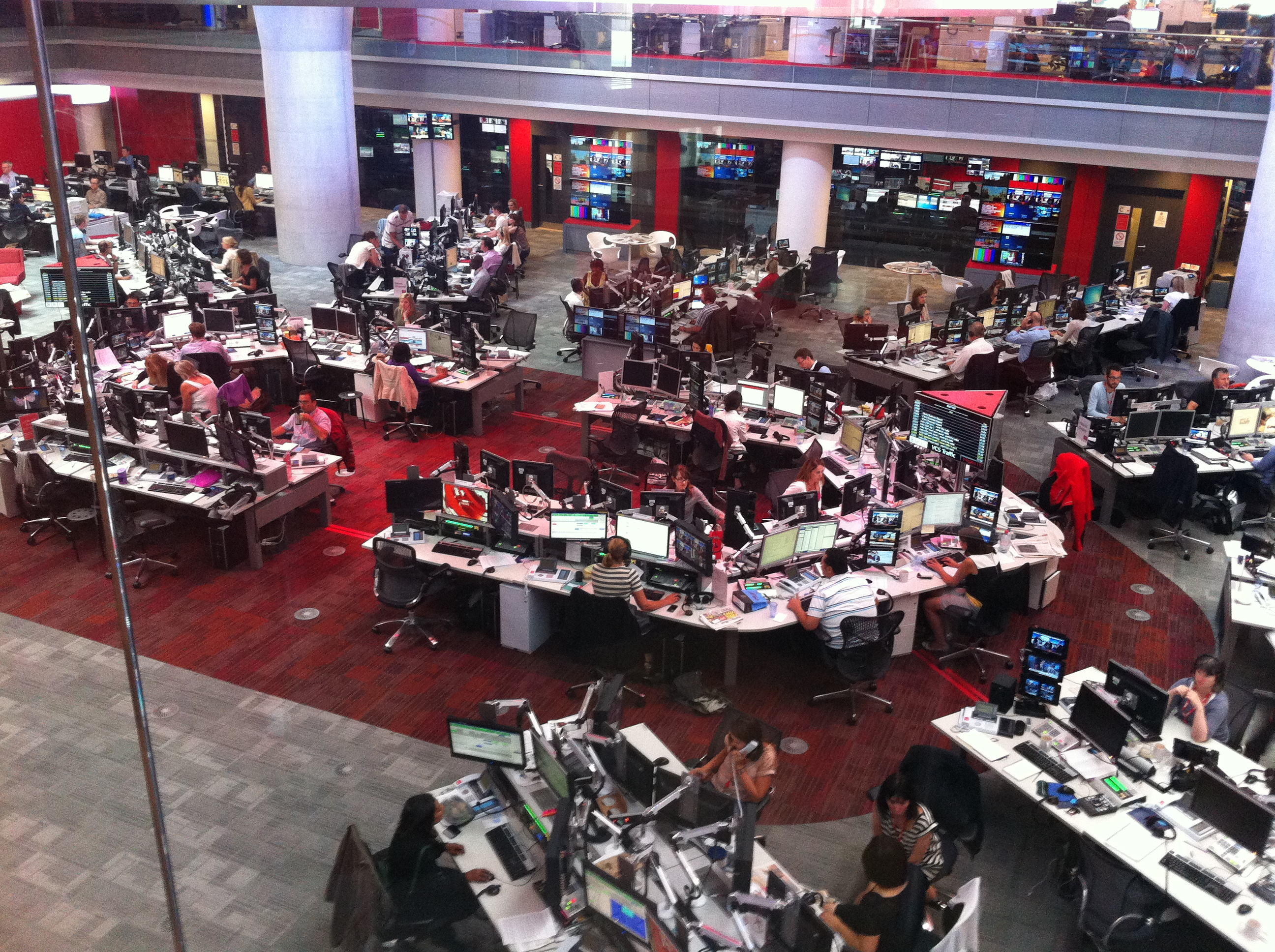
The BBC newsroom at Broadcasting House in London.

Half-hour BBC News bulletins are made available to PBS stations in the US through Los Angeles's KCET, a non-commercial independent public television station which has been separate from PBS since the beginning of 2011 due to a rights-fee dispute (it returned to being a minor PBS member station in 2019 after a merger with the major PBS member-station in the market). 80 to 90% of Americans can receive the bulletins, with PBS member stations having scheduling discretion. The programme is broadcast on several PBS stations in markets such as New York City and Washington DC.

On PBS stations, BBC News is not broadcast with traditional commercials (the breaks are filled with news stories) but omits the Met Office international weather forecast at the end of the programme, replacing it with underwriting announcements. The PBS broadcasts are tape-delayed on some stations.

BBC America formerly aired a three-hour block of BBC News programmes from 05:00 to 08:00 on weekdays, until the stabilisation of the network's carriage in the United States. Met Office forecasts were removed, and it was broadcast with advertisements.

Many airlines around the world also play pre-recorded extracts of BBC News, have text headlines from it, or have a full bulletin available on the in-flight entertainment systems.

=== Previous bulletins ===
Another BBC World News programme, the hour-long BBC World News America, aired on BBC America at 19:00 ET. A second broadcast at 22:00 ET ended in 2010 when BBC America introduced a second feed for the western time zones of the US. On 18 February 2011, it was announced that BBC World News America would no longer be broadcast on BBC America and would instead be broadcast only on BBC World and local PBS stations in the US as a 30-minute programme.

The channel also produced short bulletins for public transport services in Singapore and Hong Kong:

- Singapore Mass Rapid Transit service from Marina Bay to Changi International Airport
- Hong Kong MTR service from Chek Lap Kok International Airport-Disneyland Resort station to Disneyland Resort line

These broadcasts began with the statement: "Welcome to BBC World News on board the Singapore Mass Rapid Transit and Hong Kong MTR". The short bulletin was updated twice a day and has since been replaced by a similar programme from Mediacorp's CNA.

Travellers on the Heathrow Express rail service between London Paddington and Heathrow Airport could watch a summary of the headlines from BBC World News on the LCD screens provided.

== News presenters ==
=== Former presenters ===
- Samira Ahmed
- Karen Bowerman
- Tony Campion
- Jonathan Charles
- Peter Coë
- Stephen Cole
- James Dagwell
- Dharshini David
- Martine Dennis
- Juliet Dunlop
- Maya Even
- Adrian Finighan
- Rico Hizon
- Donald MacCormick
- Anita McNaught
- Richard Quest
- Daniela Ritorto
- Owen Thomas
- Alastair Yates

== Presentation ==
Part of the countdown sequence used since consolidation with domestic BBC News channel on 3 April 2023.

The channel was criticised at launch for its style of presentation, with accusations of it being less authoritative than the BBC One news bulletins, with presenters appearing on-screen without jackets. Jenny Abramsky had originally planned to have a television version of the informal news radio channel BBC Radio 5 Live, or a TV version of Radio 4 News FM both of which she had run. The bright design of the set was also blamed for this – one insider reportedly described it as a "car crash in a shower" – and was subject to the network relaunch on 25 October 1999. The channel swapped studios with sister channel BBC World, moving to studio N8 within the newsroom, where it remained until 2008. New music and title sequences accompanied this set change, following the look of newly relaunched BBC One bulletins.

Graphics and titles were developed by the Lambie-Nairn design agency and were gradually rolled out across the whole of BBC News, including a similar design for regional news starting with Newsroom South East and the three 'BBC Nations' – Scotland, Wales and Northern Ireland. The similarity of main BBC News output was intended to increase the credibility of the channel as well as aiding cross-channel promotion.

A graphics relaunch in January 2007 saw the channel updated, with redesigned headline straplines, a redesigned 'digital on-screen graphic' and repositioned clock. The clock was originally placed to the left hand side of the channel name though following complaints that this could only be viewed in widescreen, it was moved to the right in February 2007. Bulletins on BBC World News and BBC One also introduced similar graphics and title sequences on the same day.

In 2008, the graphics were again relaunched, using the style introduced in 2007 and a new colour scheme. The typeface of the on-screen text was changed from Helvetica to Gill Sans.

In 2013 the graphics were changed again, to coincide with the move to New Broadcasting House. The typeface was changed back to Helvetica.

These were updated again in July 2019 when the BBC redesigned its on-air look with the growth of television viewing on smartphones and tablets. These included again redesigned, larger headline straplines sharply contrasting with the background (drawing criticism for obscuring content) using the BBC Reith typeface with larger text. Despite this, the 2008 titles and music continue to be used for the updated local titles.

=== The Lambert Report ===
The Lambert Report into the channel's performance in 2002 called upon News 24 to develop a better brand of its own, to allow viewers to differentiate between itself and similar channels such as Sky News. As a direct result of this, a brand new style across all presentation for the channel launched on 8 December 2003 at 09:00. Philip Hayton and Anna Jones were the first two presenters on the set, the relaunch of which had been put back a week due to previous power disruptions at Television Centre where the channel was based. The new designs also featured a dynamic set of titles for the channel; the globe would begin spinning from where the main story was taking place, while the headline scrolled around in a ribbon; this was occasionally replaced by the BBC News logo. The titles concluded with a red globe surrounded by a red stylised clamshell and BBC News ribbons forming above the BBC News logo.

Bulletins on BBC One moved into a new set in January 2003 although retained the previous ivory Lambie-Nairn titles until February 2004. News 24 updated the title colours slightly to match those of BBC One bulletins in time for the 50th anniversary of BBC television news on 5 July 2004.

=== Countdown sequence ===
An important part of the channel's presentation since launch has been the top of the hour countdown sequence, since there is no presentation system with continuity announcers so the countdown provides a link to the beginning of the next hour. A similar musical device is used on BBC Radio 5 Live, and mirrors the pips on BBC Radio 4.

Previous styles have included a series of fictional flags set to music between 1997 and 1999 before the major relaunch, incorporating the new contemporary music composed by David Lowe, and graphics developed by Lambie-Nairn. Various images, originally ivory numbers fully animated against a deep red background, were designed to fit the pace of the channel, and the music soon gained notoriety, and was often satirised and parodied in popular culture. Images of life around the UK were added in replacement later with the same music, together with footage of the newsroom and exterior of Television Centre. The 2003 relaunch saw a small change to this style with less of a metropolitan feel to the footage.

A new sequence was introduced on 28 March 2005, designed and created by Red Bee Media and directed by Mark Chaudoir. The full version ran for 60 seconds, though only around 30 seconds were usually shown on air. The music was revised completely but the biggest change came in the footage used – reflecting the methods and nature of newsgathering, while a strong emphasis was placed on the BBC logo itself. Satellite dishes are shown transmitting and receiving red "data streams". In production of the countdown sequence, Clive Norman filmed images around the United Kingdom, Richard Jopson in the United States, while BBC News camerapeople filmed images from Iraq, Beijing (Tiananmen Square), Bund of Shanghai, Africa, as well as areas affected by the 2004 Asian tsunami and others.

The sequence has since seen several remixes to the music and a change in visuals to focus more on the well-known journalists, with less footage of camera crews and production teams. Changes have also seen the channel logo included during the sequences and at the end, as well as the fonts used for the time. The conclusion of the countdown was altered in 2008 to feature the new presentation style, rather than a data stream moving in towards the camera. Also in 2008, the graphic for the countdown changed, resembling the BBC One Rhythm and Movement idents, due to the logo being in a red square in the bottom left corner.

To coincide with the move of BBC News to Broadcasting House, on 18 March 2013 the countdown was updated again along with several other presentation elements. Three of the most striking features of the new countdown include music performed by the BBC Concert Orchestra, a redesign of the "data streams" and the ending of the sequence no longer fading to the BBC News globe and logo, but instead stopping with a time-lapse shot outside the corporation's headquarters. The countdown was also extended to 87 seconds, which was fully shown before the first hour from Broadcasting House. In 2019, the countdown started using the BBC's new Reith font but otherwise retained the same style.

A full three-minute version of the countdown music was made available on BBC News Online and David Lowe's own website after a remix on 16 May 2006.

An international version of the countdown was launched on BBC World News on 5 September 2005 featuring more international content and similar music. Various changes have been made to the music and visuals since then, with presentation following the style of BBC News. The visuals in the sequence were updated on 10 May 2010. In June 2011, further imagery was added relating to recent events, including the conflict in Libya and views of outside 10 Downing Street. In January 2013, as part of the relocation of BBC News to Broadcasting House in Central London, BBC World News received a new countdown in the same style as the BBC News Channel's updated countdown, with some minor differences.

In April 2021, a new "sombre" version of the countdown was played, with no "data streams" and slower shots of places within the UK, or in the case of the international version, timelapse shots across the world. Both were introduced to run up to programmes immediately following the death of Prince Philip, Duke of Edinburgh, and were used again following the death of Queen Elizabeth II in 2022.

To coincide with the integration of BBC World News into BBC News, the countdown sequence was slightly refreshed in April 2023 to follow the new "Chameleon" branding scheme used by BBC television since October 2021, with the countdown now centred between the BBC and "News" wordmarks at the top- and bottom-centre of the screen respectively.
