= Sally Bundock =

British news presenter

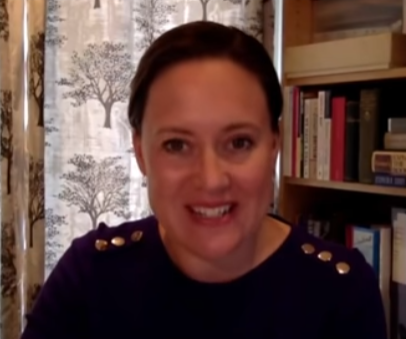
- At the World Economic Forum's Sustainable Development Summit 2021
- Born: Sally Elizabeth Jackson; May 1972 (age 54); Hertfordshire, England
- Education: Polytechnic of Wales; City University London
- Occupations: Chief Presenter, BBC News
- Spouse: Paul Bundock (m. 1999; died 2017)
- Children: 3

Sally Elizabeth Bundock (née Jackson; born May 1972) is a British news chief presenter for BBC News, who presents BBC News on BBC One and the BBC News Channel. She joined World Business Report in September 2002 and presented its early morning edition, programming viewed mostly by audiences in European and international markets. Bundock continues to present the 5am hour on BBC One, BBC World News and the BBC News channel and has done since the early 2000s, this has been called The Briefing but is now simply BBC News. She now presents Business Today in the former World Business Report early morning slots.

== Early life ==
Bundock was born in May 1972 in Hertfordshire and grew up in Smeeton Westerby, Leicestershire. She has three sisters. She attended Kibworth High School, until 14, now Kibworth Mead Academy, and Robert Smyth School, from the age of 14. She had a road accident on the Gumley to Foxton road, when aged 18, on 14 September 1990, when she drove into a hedge.

She completed an undergraduate degree in public administration at the Polytechnic of Wales, then moved to London to obtain a postgraduate diploma in journalism at City University London.

Following the merger of BBC News and BBC World News she was appointed as one of the nine London based chief presenters, continuing to present BBC News on BBC One and the combined News Channel.

== Career ==
Bundock is a financial journalist and presenter who began covering business news in the mid-1990s when she worked for Bloomberg. Since then she has covered many momentous events including World Economic Forums, G7 conferences and historic EU Summits. During 2007 she became a BBC World News World Business Report anchor for the breakfast news slot, often presenting with Jonathan Charles And David Jessel. She works at the BBC as a world news presenter, and is known to occasionally speak at media and journalistic events. Since 2017, she has been the solo anchor of the breakfast slot aimed at European, Middle Eastern and African audiences.

=== World Business Report ===
World Business Report was launched in September 2001 and offers a blend of news, business and sport to reflect the demands of the global business community. She joined the programme in September 2002, when it was a segment of The World Today. In the past she has also presented World News Today: Business Edition, which later became Business Live in 2015, and Worklife in 2019. With World Business Report ending in May 2024, Bundock became a main presenter on Business Today.

== Personal life ==
She married Paul Bundock, from Durban, South Africa in 1999 in Smeeton Westerby, Leicestershire; he died in June 2017 from a rare form of cancer called carcinoid tumors. The couple had three sons. She lives in Beaconsfield, Buckinghamshire. She is a Christian.
