= World Business Report =

BBC news television series

- Final title card, used in 2019-2024
- Created by: BBC News
- Presented by: Ben Boulos; Sally Bundock; Samantha Simmonds; Nancy Kacungira; Alice Baxter; Aaron Heslehurst; Ben Thompson
- Country of origin: United Kingdom
- Original language: English

Production
- Production locations: Studio C, Broadcasting House, London
- Running time: 12 - 25 minutes

Original release
- Network: BBC News (international feed); BBC News (UK feed); BBC One; BBC Two
- Release: 1995 – 7 May 2024

Related
- Business Today; World Business Report (radio programme); Asia Business Report; Middle East Business Report; Africa Business Report; India Business Report; Business Edition

World Business Report is a television business news programme produced by BBC News and shown on international feed of BBC News alongside its UK counterpart and BBC One on weekdays between 1995 and 2024. There were two editions broadcast each weekday, at 05:30 and 06:30 GMT. Each edition lasted 25 minutes. The 05:30 edition was also seen on BBC One and the 11:30 edition also aired on BBC Two during their simulcasts of BBC News (UK) channel. The main presenters of the programme are Sally Bundock and Victoria Valentine. Vishala Sri-Pathma, Nancy Kacungira, Ben Thompson, Ben Boulos, Samantha Simmonds, Aaron Heslehurst and Alice Baxter have acted as relief presenters.

Other editions of World Business Report were shown on the international feed at 06:30, 07:45 and 14:30 GMT and since 6 March 2023, the 14:30 edition was seen by UK viewers on the UK feed of BBC News.

On 7 May 2024 in the edition presented by Ben Thompson, he announced that it was the final edition of the programme and World Business Report was going to be replaced by a new programme called Business Today. Business Today premiered at 14:30 BST on the same day.

== Presenters ==
These are the presenters of the programme when it came to an end in 2024.

=== Monday to Thursday ===
- Morning (05:30 GMT, 06:30 GMT and 07:45 GMT) - Sally Bundock
- Afternoon (11:30 GMT, 14:30 GMT) - Victoria Valentine

=== Friday ===
- Morning (05:30 GMT, 06:30 GMT and 07:45 GMT) - Aaron Heslehurst
- Afternoon (11:30 GMT, 14:30 GMT) - Ben Boulos
