= BBC News (British TV channel) =

British 24-hour television news channel

- Logo used since 2023
- Country: United Kingdom
- Headquarters: Broadcasting House, London, England

Programming
- Language: English
- Picture format: 1080i (Note: Not available on Freeview) HDTV(downscaled to 16:9 576i for the SDTV feed)

Ownership
- Owner: BBC
- Parent: BBC (domestic); BBC Studios (overseas)
- Sister channels: BBC One; BBC Two; BBC Three; BBC Four; BBC Parliament; CBBC; CBeebies; BBC Scotland; BBC Alba

History
- Launched: 9 November 1997; 28 years ago
- Former names: BBC News 24 (1997–2008)

Links
- Website: www.bbc.com

Availability

Terrestrial
- Freeview: Channel 231 (SD)

Streaming media
- BBC iPlayer: Watch live (UK only)
- BBC News Online: Watch live (UK only)
- BBC News (TV channel): Watch live (Worldwide access is available)

The BBC News channel is a British free-to-air public broadcast television news channel owned and operated by the BBC. The channel is based at and broadcasts from Broadcasting House in the West End of London from which it is anchored during British daytime, with overnight broadcasts anchored from Washington, D.C. and Singapore. It was launched as BBC News 24 on 9 November 1997 at 17:30, as part of the BBC's foray into digital domestic television channels, becoming the first competitor to Sky News, which had been running since 1989.

On 22 February 2006, the channel was named News Channel of the Year at the Royal Television Society Television Journalism Awards for the first time in its history. The judges remarked that this was the year that the channel had "really come into its own." The channel won the accolade for a second time in 2017. From May 2007, viewers in the UK could watch the channel via the BBC News website. In April 2008, the channel was renamed BBC News as part of a £550,000 rebranding of the BBC's news output, complete with a new studio and presentation.

The channel's international counterpart, formerly known as BBC World News, initially operated as a counterpart carrying international news, as well as selected programmes from the domestic service. Unlike BBC News in the UK, which is a free-to-air channel funded by the licence fee, the world feed is a pay television service distributed by BBC Studios and funded by advertising. Some of its programmes had been simulcast by the domestic BBC News channel, especially in the overnight hours.

In 2022, the BBC announced that it would further consolidate the programming and talent of the BBC News and World News channels as a cost-cutting move; these changes took place on 3 April 2023, with BBC World News being renamed "BBC News", and both channels restructured to use a common schedule with domestic opt-outs for UK-specific news coverage and programmes.

== History ==
Logo used from 2008 to 2019

Logo used from 2019 to 2022

Logo used from 2022 to 2023 (Note: This logo is still being used as a secondary logo as of 2026.)

Rolling news began in the UK on 5 February 1989 when Sky News was launched and on 16 January 1995, the BBC launched an international news channel BBC World. However it was meant for global audiences and was not normally available to viewers in the UK. In May 1996, the BBC announced that it was to launch a UK rolling news service as part of its move into digital broadcasting.

BBC News 24 went on air on 9 November 1997, nearly a year before digital television was launched in the UK and due to a lack of space on satellite, the channel was only available on cable, with an overnight shop window on BBC One when that channel was not on air. However, Sky News had complained about the costs associated with running a channel that only a minority of the UK's licence fee could view. Sky News claimed that a number of British cable operators had been incentivised to carry News 24 (which, as a licence-fee funded channel was made available to such operators for free) in preference to the commercial Sky News. However, in September 1999 the European Commission ruled against a complaint made by Sky News that the publicly funded channel was unfair and illegal under EU law. The Commission ruled that the licence fee should be considered state aid but that such aid was justified due to the public service remit of the BBC and that it did not exceed actual costs.

The advent of digital television in the United Kingdom in autumn 1998 saw the channel launch on Sky's new digital satellite service and a month later it started to broadcast via digital terrestrial television. Initially it was difficult to obtain a digital satellite or terrestrial receiver without a subscription to Sky or ONdigital respectively, but following the demise of ITV Digital in 2002 and the subsequent launch of Freeview, the channel started to become much more widely available and the BBC Governors' annual report for 2005/2006 reported that average audience figures for fifteen-minute periods had reached 8.6% in multichannel homes. The 2004 report also claimed that the channel outperformed Sky News in both weekly and monthly reach in multichannel homes for the January 2004 period, and for the first time in two years moved ahead of Sky News in being perceived as the channel best for news.

In 2005, the Head of television news Peter Horrocks outlined plans to provide more funding and resources for the channel and shift the corporation's emphasis regarding news away from the traditional BBC One bulletins and across to the rolling news channel. The introduction of simulcasts of the main bulletins on the channel was to allow the news bulletins to pool resources rather than work against each other at key times in the face of competition, particularly from Sky News.

=== 2008 rebranding ===
On 21 April 2008, BBC News 24 was renamed "BBC News" on the channel itself, and referred to as the "BBC News Channel" on other BBC services. This was part of the Creative Futures plan, launched in 2006, to bring all BBC News output under the single brand name.

The BBC News Channel moved from the Studio N8 set, which became home to BBC World News, to what was the home of the national news in Studio N6, allowing the channel to share its set with the BBC News at One and the BBC News at Ten – with other bulletins moving to Studio TC7.

=== Move to Broadcasting House ===
The channel relocated, along with the remaining BBC News services at Television Centre, to the newly refurbished Broadcasting House on 18 March 2013 at 13:00 GMT. Presentation and on-screen graphics were refreshed, with new full HD studios and a live newsroom backdrop. Moving cameras in the newsroom form part of the top of the hour title sequence and are used at the start of weather bulletins.

=== Consolidation with BBC World News ===
On 26 May 2022, as part of planned cuts and streamlining across the broadcaster, the BBC announced plans for consolidation of the domestic BBC News channel in the UK with BBC World News. The domestic and international versions would share content, while maintaining the ability to opt out from the shared feed for domestic coverage if warranted. The BBC promoted that the service would offer "new flagship programmes built around high-profile journalists, and programmes commissioned for multiple platforms".

The BBC announced a new presenter line-up for the merged service in February 2023, led by Matthew Amroliwala, Christian Fraser, Yalda Hakim, Lucy Hockings, and Maryam Moshiri. On 3 April 2023, the BBC World News channel rebranded as BBC News, formally marking the implementation of the unified service with the UK feed opting out for UK-specific programming, such as BBC television newscasts and Newsnight, and coverage of UK-specific news not judged to be significant enough to warrant rolling coverage globally. Overall, the changes resulted in the layoffs of about 50 employees, including presenters David Eades, Joanna Gosling, and Tim Willcox.

Yalda Hakim left the channel to join Sky News in September 2023, meaning that Maryam Moshiri could have her own programme in the slot of Hakim's former Daily Global programme.

In February 2024, Ben Brown, Geeta Guru-Murthy, and Anita McVeigh rejoined the news channel after a year off air as chief presenters.

During the 2024 general election campaign, BBC News temporarily unwound the unified service, and reverted to broadcasting a domestic feed of rolling coverage from 09:00 to 20:00 daily, as well as an additional UK-specific bulletin at 23:00 following Newsnight. This continued through the State Opening of Parliament, after which the prior schedule was reinstated beginning 18 July. The 23:00 bulletin remained until October 2024, when it was replaced with World News America.

In January 2025, the UK feed dropped its simulcast of BBC Breakfast as a pilot, with world feed programming now carried in its timeslot; executive news editor Paul Royall considered the simulcast redundant, citing that the majority of its viewership came from BBC One and iPlayer. The pilot ended in the spring but was reinstated again on 29 October 2025, seemingly now on a permanent basis.

=== YouTube livestream ===
As of October 2026, the channel is available to watch as a livestream on YouTube in Australia, Kenya, Nigeria, Poland, United Kingdom, and United Stations.

== BBC News HD ==
BBC News HD logo (2013–2019)

On 16 July 2013, the BBC announced that a high-definition (HD) simulcast of BBC News would be launched by early 2014. HD output from BBC News has been simulcast on BBC One HD and BBC Two HD since the move to Broadcasting House in March 2013. The channel launched on 10 December 2013 (at an earlier date than originally planned) and rolled out nationwide over the next six months (as did BBC Four HD, CBBC HD and CBeebies HD).

BBC News HD was removed from Freeview on 30 June 2022 due to the closure of the COM7 multiplex.

There are HD versions of BBC News on BBC iPlayer, Freesat channel 200, Sky channel 503, and Virgin Media channel 601.

== Programming ==
Sophie Raworth presenting the first BBC News at One at Broadcasting House, 18 March 2013, 13:00

=== Breaking news ===
The BBC maintains guidelines for procedures to be taken for breaking news. With domestic news, the correspondent first recorded a "generic minute" summary (for use by all stations and channels) and then priority was to report on BBC Radio 5 Live, then on the BBC News channel and any other programmes that are on air. Since 5 Live's move to Manchester, this has been reversed. For foreign news, first a "generic minute" is recorded, then reports are to World Service radio, then the reporter talks to any other programmes that are on air.

A key claim made by Lord Lambert in his report had been that the channel was slower to react to breaking news compared with its main rival Sky News. To counteract this, a new feature introduced with the 2003 relaunch was a "breaking news sting": a globe shown briefly onscreen to direct a viewer's attention to the breaking news.

The graphics relaunch in January 2007 saw the globe sting replaced by a red strapline to highlight the breaking story immediately.

To complement this, a permanent live news ticker had earlier been introduced in 2006: this had previously been in use only sporadically. News statements are shown as continuously scrolling upper-case text located at the bottom of the screen; some past ambiguities noted have included spelling the plural of MPs as "MPS", together with other occasional spelling and grammatical errors. The design of this ticker was slightly altered with the 2007 graphics redesign and from June turned red to indicate breaking news, as Newswatch reported viewers' confusion. The ticker was removed during trails and weather forecasts.

Lucy Hockings presenting News Now at Broadcasting House, 7 October 2023

A new set of graphics, including a change to font style, was officially launched in July 2019 although it was broadcast in error up to a couple of months before. The news ticker, which had been a long-running feature of the Channel, was replaced by a flipper as stories no longer scroll across the screen. The headlines now have a limited length and appear in full in turn. The word "BREAKING" may appear on screen and flash to indicate breaking news. Occasionally a breaking news sting may appear on the Channel to call attention to breaking news. This sting gained some notoriety in June 2017 when a technical error caused it to appear several times in a row, delaying the start of the BBC News at Ten. Usually the BBC News Channel crosses over to live events, such as press conferences, without using the sting and the presenter on air introduces what viewers are seeing.

=== BBC World News simulcasts ===
The BBC began simulcasting the channel overnight on terrestrial channel BBC One with the launch of the channel, ending the tradition of a closedown but at the same time effectively making the service available to many more viewers. In the early 2000s, BBC Two also started simulcasting the channel, although the weekend morning show Weekend 24 had been simulcast on the channel in the early days. During major breaking news events, the BBC News Channel has been broadcast on BBC One; examples of special broadcasts include the 11 September 2001 attacks, 7 July 2005 London bombings, the capture of Saddam Hussein, the death of Osama bin Laden and the death and funerals of Prince Philip and Elizabeth II. In 2020, shared programming between BBC One and the News Channel often included the UK Government's Coronavirus Daily Update. This was usually broadcast during late afternoons when the Government made announcements.

Coverage of major events has also been simulcast on BBC World News. Currently, overnight viewers receive 25-minute editions of BBC News every hour, and on weekdays 23:00–02:00 receive Newsday, live from Singapore and from London which also includes Business Today and Sportsday between 00:30 and 01:00 and also between 01:30 and 02:00. From 02:00 to 05:00 (00:00–06:00 on weekends) receive BBC World News. The Briefing airs between 05:00 and 06:00 on weekdays.

These simulcasts were expanded as a result of the COVID-19 pandemic. The BBC introduced a streamlined schedule and the News Channel and BBC World News now share major parts of evening and weekend coverage. From August 2020 this was changed and made permanent to 10:00 to 12:00 and on weekdays 19:00 to 06:00, with opt-outs for BBC News at Ten and half an hour at 20:30, weekends 21:00 to 06:00, apart from the evening BBC One bulletin.

World News is no longer simulcasted, given that the channel has been merged with the domestic provision, thereby any programming on the News Channel is broadcast as the channel says "Around the world and across the UK".

=== BBC One, BBC Two and BBC World News simulcasts ===
BBC Breakfast was simulcast since its launch in 2000 until 2025 on BBC One and BBC News, replacing the individual breakfast shows that had run on both channels. Since May 2006 until 17 March 2020, the simulcast generally ran from 06:00 until 08:30 during the week. Breakfast on BBC One continued from MediaCityUK until 09:15 with entertainment and features, whilst BBC News usually went to Business Live until 09:00 and reverted to its traditional format from 09:00. Since 18 March 2020, the COVID-19 pandemic has caused changes to these arrangements. Business Live, which had become Worklife, is no longer on air. Weekdays, BBC Breakfast ran runs until 09:00 on both BBC One and the BBC News Channel and there is then an hour of news, which was called the BBC News at Nine, on both channels. This continued as the first half of two hours of programming on the BBC News Channel, the second hour was usually taken by BBC Two presented by Victoria Derbyshire on Mondays to Wednesdays and was generally by Annita McVeigh on the other two days of the week.

BBC Two simulcasts the News Channel on weekday mornings from 09:00 until 12:15 or 13:00. Coverage switches to BBC One in the form of the simulcast BBC News at One. The BBC News at One may be broadcast on BBC One only however during periods of breaking news or major announcements in the House of Commons carried only on the News Channel, if it's an international story coverage will switch for the hour to simulcast with BBC World News. A similar arrangement applies for the BBC News at Six, generally simulcast on both BBC One and the News Channel but, as ever, subject to change for breaking news for the News Channel.

The BBC News at Ten began simulcasting on the channel on 30 January 2006 as part of the Ten O'Clock Newshour, followed by extended sport and business news updates. The bulletin was joined in being simulcast on 10 April 2006 when the BBC News at One (with British Sign Language in-vision signing) and BBC News at Six bulletins were added to the schedule following a similar format to the News at Ten in terms of content on the channel once each simulcast ends.

During the summer, the hour-long programme News 24 Sunday was broadcast both on BBC One and the BBC News Channel at 09:00, to replace The Andrew Marr Show, which is off air. It was presented by a news presenter, and came from the main News channel studio. The programme was made up mostly of interviews focusing on current affairs, and included a full paper review, a weather summary, and a news update at 09:00, 09:30 and 10:00. Sunday Morning Live and alternative programming now fill this slot.

From 2013, a new programme was created for BBC Two for 11:00–12:00 weekdays, consisting of 30 minutes of domestic news and 30 minutes of BBC World News. On Wednesdays, when parliament is sitting the latter is replaced by the Daily Politics for coverage of Prime Minister's Questions (PMQ). In March 2016 the channel started showing Newsnight at 23:15.

The coverage from 10:00 to 13:00 on BBC Two and the News Channel is part of three-hour block of BBC World News simulcast due to the Coronavirus Pandemic. However, by the end of 2021 the simulcast had been cut back to a single hour on weekdays, between 10:00 and 11:00 with all-morning simulcasts continuing at the weekend. BBC World News produces the three-hour BBC News / BBC World News simulcast between 19:00 to 22:00 and 23:00 to 06:00, including one edition of The Papers. From August 2020 this was changed and made permanent to 10:00 to 12:00 and on weekdays 19:00 to 06:00, with opt-outs for BBC News at Ten and half an hour at 20:30, weekends 21:00 to 06:00, these exclude BBC One bulletin.

=== Current situation ===
BBC News currently simulcasts all of BBC Television's main BBC One news bulletins – BBC News at One, BBC News at Six and BBC News at Ten. On Wednesdays BBC News simulcasts much of Politics Live which is broadcast on BBC Two to provide coverage of Prime Minister's Questions. After the News at 10, Newsnight is also aired on the BBC News Channel. Weekend BBC One news bulletins are not shown on the BBC News Channel. All network simulcasts are broadcast on the domestic feed only.

=== Exclusive programmes ===
==== Live news programming ====
- BBC News – The latest national and international news as they break from the BBC.
- The Context – The latest news from both sides of the Atlantic, presented from London and Washington, D.C. with a pannel of regular guests.
- Newsday – Live international news and business from Singapore. Presented by Steve Lai.
- BBC Sportsday – All the latest sports news and results from around the globe.
- Sunday with Laura Kuenssberg – Interviews and analysis of the weeks big news from the UK and around the world stories, including interviews with key politicians and personalities from all walks of life.
- Business Today – The latest business news. Launched on 7 May 2024.
- BBC News Now – Reactive and fast-paced international breaking news, business and sport, covering several stories in an immersive format with as much detail as possible. Launched on 22 May 2023.
- Verified Live – Forensic analysis and journalism from the BBC Verify team, using advanced editorial tools and techniques to investigate, source and verify information, video, and images. Launched on 22 May 2023.
- The World Today – The best of the BBC's global journalism. As well as interviews with leading figures from the arts, culture and entertainment.
- BBC World News America – in-depth News and analysis of the days main US, UK and global stories. Broadcast from the BBC's Washington, D.C. studios.
- Your Voice, Your BBC News - BBC experts and correspondents answer viewers' questions and investigate about what matters most to them in their lives.
- BBC Politics Live Specials – Coverage of major speeches and the party conferences as well as the day's biggest political, international, and diplomatic news.

==== Other programmes ====
- Global Eye & Eye Investgations – Investigations by the world service specialist investigations team across the world, the main one being BBC Africa Eye Extended verions air under the Eye Investgations banner.
- Global Questions – The panels and contributing audiences discuss topical themes put to representatives from global politics, finance, business, the arts, media and other areas.
- The Media Show – analysis editor Ros Atkins, culture & media editor Katie Razzall, and guests discuss the current state of the media.
- Panorama – Current affairs programme, featuring interviews and investigative reports on a wide variety of subjects.
- Talking Business – BBC business presenters, based in London, New York, Mumbai, Johannesburg and Singapore, discuss with the most important and influential people from the world of business and finance, the key issues of the day.
- The Travel Show – A source for the biggest travel stories and essential journalism, featuring a global team of presenters sharing experiences from London, Tokyo, Sydney, New York and Kuala Lumpur.
- Witness – A monthly round-up of BBC News stories of global events told by the people who were there.
- Unspun World – Provides an unvarnished version of the week's major global news stories with the BBC global expertise.
- This Cultural Life – In-depth conversations with some of the world's leading artists and creatives across theatre, visual arts, music, dance, film and more.
- The President's Path – A weekly discussion on the US presidency with BBC US political correspondents and Caitríona Perry and Sumi Somaskanda.

==== Previous programming ====
- BBC News at Five – An hour of news live from Broadcasting House in London, usually presented by Huw Edwards or Jane Hill, covering the day's national and international news, sports events, and weather. On 13 March 2020, the last edition of the BBC News at Five was broadcast and was suspended until further notice in light of the COVID-19 pandemic. The UK Government's daily press conference on the pandemic was broadcast in place of BBC News at Five on BBC One and the BBC News Channel. The new schedule under the COVID-19 pandemic involves the BBC News at One presenter continuing on air until 16:00, replacing Afternoon Live. The programme did not return after the daily news briefings ended later in 2020.
- BBC News at Nine – An in-depth look at the morning news and briefing on the day's events. This programme included News Briefing, involving a look at top stories on the BBC News website through smartphone access.
- The Briefing – Sally Bundock with news, business, and sports from BBC News. It is currently airing unbranded between 05:00 – 09:00am.
  - Business Briefing – Sally Bundock with the latest business, economic and financial news, market updates and interviews with the key news-makers in the business world. It is currently airing as the 05:30, 06:30, 07:30 & 08:30 edition of Business Today.
  - News Briefing – A summary of the latest headlines from newspapers and websites. It is currently airing unbranded as part of an hour block of BBC News.
- Business Live – Sally Bundock and Ben Thompson or Tanya Beckett with the latest business news and a look ahead to the news that will shape the business day. With the latest news from end of trading in Asia, Europe, Middle East and Americas.
- Dateline London – Foreign correspondents based in London give their views on the week's international news. The final episode was broadcast on 15 October 2022.
- Outside Source – Ros Atkins hosts live reports linking up with the BBC's global network of correspondents. This was occasionally simulcast at 18:00 weekdays during major stories. It was broadcast at 19:00 to 20:00 (Monday to Thursday).
- The Papers – From 2013 until 2023, the channel broadcast The Papers which featured lively and informed conversation about the next day's or today's headlines as featured in the national newspapers. From around 2017 the nightly editions were usually to Clive Myrie and Martine Croxall, the latter having also generally covered some late weekday and weekend shifts. Other News Channel presenters filled in across the week. A Sunday-morning edition was usually presented by Ben Brown as part of his News Channel 09:00 to 14:00 shift. The Papers was axed in January 2023 ahead of the merger between the UK news channel with BBC World News.
- The Daily Global – A deep-dive into some of the significant news stories of the day, using in-depth interviews combined with a unique global perspective. Launched on 22 May 2023. Relaunched as The World Today on 21 February 2024.
- STORYFix – A short-lived weekly programme which was broadcast in 2006 and 2007. It took a mildly satirical view of the week's events – although the satire was aimed more at the way the news was reported than at the news itself. The programme ended after just a year as it had been seen as being part of a video podcasting trial, and that the production team 'will be moving on to other projects'.
- Victoria Derbyshire – From 2015 until 2020, Victoria Derbyshire was broadcast on weekday mornings. The programme had featured original stories, exclusive interviews, audience debate and breaking news. On 22 January 2020, it was announced that the programme would be axed later in 2020 as part of BBC cuts. However, due to priority put on coverage of the COVID-19 pandemic, the BBC suspended the programme earlier than initially planned with the final episode airing on 17 March 2020. Derbyshire has remained as a presenter in the same time slot, instead presenting a standardly structured BBC News newscast.
- World News Today – This programme focused on the UK, Europe, Middle East and Africa and was presented by Kasia Madera, Nancy Kacungira, Lukwesa Burak and Lewis Vaughan Jones. It was broadcast at 19:00, 21:00 and 03:00. The 19:00 programme was simulcast on BBC Four, when Beyond 100 Days was not on air, and the 03:00 programme was simulcast on BBC One. Under COVID-19, the programme effectively ended when it became part of the news coverage simulcast with BBC World News during the weekends (including Friday mid-evening and the approximate half hour slot from 21:00 on Saturday and Sunday).
- Your News – A user-generated news programme which was part of the channel's weekend schedule from November 2006 until December 2008.
- BBC Newsroom Live – Breaking News, Business and Analysis, came to an end in 2020 due to cuts and the COVID-19 Pandemic. The hours in which it aired has been replaced with a regular bulletin, Business Today and BBC News Now.
- Afternoon Live – Presented by Simon McCoy, exclusive to the then called "BBC News Channel" airing from the hours of 14:00 – 17:00 BST. Ended in 2020 due to cuts and the COVID-19 Pandemic.
- Nicky Campbell – A visualised radio phone-in show from BBC Radio 5 Live simulcast from the hours of 9:00 BST to 11:00 BST on the UK feed and BBC iPlayer. The visual simulcast ended in 2023 and the schedule has been reverted to BBC News programmes.
- Click – A guide to gadgets, websites, games and computer industry news.
- HARDtalk – Stephen Sackur talks to newsmakers and personalities from across the globe.
- Sportsday – ended on 1 August 2025, with the focus shifting to breaking sports news ‘digitally’ - i.e. online.
- Our World – Features the BBC's news programmes on current issues around the world. The documentaries are intended to showcase BBC journalism at its best. Replaced by Global Eye and Eye Investigations.

Other programmes previous broadcast on BBC News Channel included Head 2 Head, E24, The Record Europe, Politics Europe and News 24 Tonight, a weekday evening programme which ran from 2005 to 2008, providing a round up of the day's news.

=== 2015 schedule changes ===
As part of budget cuts, major changes to the channel were announced in late 2014 / early 2015. This included axing some bulletins and replacing them with Victoria Derbyshire and BBC Business Live with Sally Bundock and Ben Thompson in the morning. Outside Source with Ros Atkins – an "interactive" show already broadcast on BBC World News – aired Mondays-Thursday at (during major stories at 18:00) and 21:00 and a new edition of World News Today Friday-Sunday at 21:00 (during major stories at 19:00/20:00 Monday-Friday) adding to the 19:00 edition on BBC Four. HARDtalk was moved to 20:30 in May. The 00:00 edition was replaced on Sundays–Thursday with Newsday and on Friday-Saturday a standard edition of BBC World News.

=== BBC World News shared programming history ===
On 1 October 2007, BBC World News started broadcasting BBC World News America and World News Today at 00:00 and 03:00 GMT respectively. World News Today was simulcast on the BBC News channel at 03:00 GMT. BBC World News America used to be aired as a reduced length, time-delayed version at 00:30 GMT, with ABC World News Tonight with David Muir also being shown at 01:30 every Tuesday-Friday.

From 13 June 2011, the weekday editions of BBC News at 01:00, 02:00, 03:00 and 04:00 were replaced with Newsday. The programme acts as a morning news bulletin for the Asia-Pacific region and is broadcast as a double-headed news bulletin with Rico Hizon in Singapore and Babita Sharma in London. Asia Business Report and Sport Today are aired at the back of the first three hours of Newsday. But Newsday changed to 23:00–02:00 on BBC News a year later meaning Mike Embley presents Tuesday-Friday BBC World News 23:00–02:00 with Kasia Madera on Saturdays and Daniela Ritorto 00:00–06:00 Sunday, 02:00–05:00 Friday/Monday.

BBC World News and World Business Report air at 05:00. This was previously known as The World Today, However, since November 2017 this was rebranded as The Briefing and Business Briefing on both channels and in lieu of commercials seen on the international broadcasts, the presenters gave a brief update on UK news for domestic audiences.

In June 2015, BBC News began simulcasting Outside Source with Ros Atkins on Mondays-Thursday at (during major stories 18:00) / at 21:00 and a new edition of World News Today Friday-Sunday at (during major stories Monday-Friday 19:00) 21:00. Since January 2017, they began simulcasting Beyond 100 Days (previously '100 Days and 100 Days +) Monday to Thursday at 19:00, presented from London and Washington. During August, Beyond 100 Days is replaced by another edition of World News Today.

On 26 May 2022, as part of planned cuts and streamlining to create a "digital first" broadcaster, the BBC announced plans to consolidate the BBC News and BBC World News networks into a single service under the "BBC News" name. The merged service was slated to launch in April 2023, with the BBC stating that it would offer "new flagship programmes built around high-profile journalists, and programmes commissioned for multiple platforms". The international version of the BBC News channel remains an advertising-supported service distributed by the corporation's commercial arm, BBC Studios. The domestic channel may opt out from the shared schedule to provide coverage of UK-specific breaking news, and would continue to carry UK-specific programmes (such as simulcasts of BBC One bulletins and Newsnight) that are not cleared by the international channel.

By the end of 2022, sharing had extended to 23:00–06:00 UK time, BBC News and BBC World News simulcast for the first 25 minutes of each hour with world news shown all through the simulcasts. In addition, the 10:00 hour on weekdays was simulcast and at the weekend, simulcasts run throughout the morning UK-time. The two channels also simulcast between 19:00 and 22:00. UK-specific rolling coverage had, by now, been restricted to daytime hours.

As of Wednesday 15 January 2025, The UK feed has begun to simulcast the international feed from the hours of 05:00 to 13:00 BST until it breaks away for BBC News at One. UK Viewers are now able to watch the 06:30 and 07:30 editions of Business Today which were formally shown on the international feed only. The international feed broke away at 10:30 BST to show HardTalk until that programme ended in March 2025. At 17:30 BST Focus on Africa is shown whilst the UK feed stays with Verified Live. On occasions where there is a significant global story or if there is a delay to the network bulletin, the channel simulcasts the 18:00 editions of The World Today and the 22:00 editions of World News America, instead of BBC News at Ten and BBC News at Six. It is mentioned that in the case of major UK breaking news, BBC Breakfast would be carried on the BBC News Channel.

=== Sports ===
Since 5 March 2012, sports bulletins come from the BBC Sport Centre in MediaCityUK in Salford Quays, where the sports network BBC Radio 5 Live is also based.

Headlines are usually provided at 15 minutes past the hour with a full bulletin after the bottom-of-the-hour headlines. There are also extended sports bulletins per day, entitled Sportsday or Sport Today (when simulcasting with BBC World News) broadcast at 00:45, 01:45, 02:45, 03:45, 13:30, 18:30, 19:30 (weekends only), 22:30 (weekdays only). Each bulletin is read by a single sports presenter, with the exception of Saturday Sportsday, which is double headed.

The channel's sports bulletins (internally known as Sport 24) have always had a separate, dedicated production gallery, which is also responsible for the graphics.

Bulletins during BBC Breakfast are presented by Sally Nugent or Mike Bushell, with the latter also appearing on other sports bulletins on the channel. As of March 2019 the main sports presenters on the channel are Olly Foster, Gavin Ramjaun, Katie Gornall, Chetan Pathak, Katherine Downes, Tulsen Tollett, Lizzie Greenwood-Hughes and John Watson.

Until March 2012, bulletins came from the News Channel studio at the quarter to the hour. Presenters for bulletins on the channel have included: Reshmin Chowdhury, Amanda Davies, Sean Fletcher, Matt Gooderick, Celina Hinchcliffe, Rachael Hodges, Damian Johnson, Adnan Nawaz and Olympic gold medallist turned journalist Matthew Pinsent.

=== Business ===
Before BBC News moved to Broadcasting House, an hourly business update was included during the weekday schedule from the BBC Business Unit. There were two shifts, from 08:30 to 14:00 and 14:00 to 23:00, presented by Penny Haslam, Maryam Moshiri, Ben Thompson, Adam Parsons, Susannah Streeter, Joe Lynam, Sara Coburn or Sally Eden. News Channel updates were usually broadcast at 40 minutes past the hour between 08:00 and 23:00. The 21:40 round-up was often earlier and the 22:40 bulletin is an extended round-up of the day's business news. Until May 2009, the business updates on the BBC News Channel were broadcast from one of the London Stock Exchange's studios in central London. From then until March 2013 the bulletins were provided from the channel's studio at BBC Television Centre. The business updates were axed in March 2013 as part of the BBC's Delivering Quality First plan. But after complaints returned in November 2013.

Stock market updates now only appear during the quarter-to-the-hour headlines. Rachel Horne is the main presenter from 13:30 to 18:00, with Vishala Sri-Pathma, Alice Baxter, Jamie Robertson, Aaron Heslehurst and Sally Bundock. There is normally an extended bulletin at 16:45 when the main business stories of the day are discussed on Afternoon Live. Bundock and Thompson present Business Live on weekdays at 08:30. Declan Curry presented Your Money, a weekly round-up on a Saturday morning.

Alice Baxter and Sally Bundock presented World Business Report.

== Presentation ==
=== Graphics ===
The channel was criticised at launch for its style of presentation, with accusations of it being less authoritative than the BBC One news bulletins, with presenters appearing on-screen without jackets. Jenny Abramsky had originally planned to have a television version of the informal news radio channel BBC Radio 5 Live, or a TV version of Radio 4 News FM both of which she had run. The bright design of the set was also blamed for this – one insider reportedly described it as a "car crash in a shower" – and was subject to the network relaunch on 25 October 1999. The channel swapped studios with sister channel BBC World, moving to studio N8 within the newsroom, where it remained until 2008. New music and title sequences accompanied this set change, following the look of newly relaunched BBC One bulletins.

Graphics and titles were developed by the Lambie-Nairn design agency and were gradually rolled out across the whole of BBC News, including a similar design for regional news starting with Newsroom South East and the three 'BBC Nations' – Scotland, Wales and Northern Ireland. The similarity of main BBC News output was intended to increase the credibility of the channel as well as aiding cross-channel promotion.

A graphics relaunch in January 2007 saw the channel updated, with redesigned headline straplines, a redesigned 'digital on-screen graphic' and repositioned clock. The clock was originally placed to the left hand side of the channel name though following complaints that this could only be viewed in widescreen, it was moved to the right in February 2007. Bulletins on BBC World News and BBC One also introduced similar graphics and title sequences on the same day.

In 2008, the graphics were again relaunched, using the style introduced in 2007 and a new colour scheme. The typeface of the on-screen text was changed from Helvetica to Gill Sans.

In 2013 the graphics were changed again, to coincide with the move to New Broadcasting House. The typeface was changed back to Helvetica.

These were updated again in July 2019 when the BBC redesigned its on-air look with the growth of television viewing on smartphones and tablets. These included again redesigned, larger headline straplines sharply contrasting with the background (drawing criticism for obscuring content) using the BBC Reith typeface with larger text. Despite this, the 2008 titles and music continue to be used for the updated local titles.

=== The Lambert Report ===
The Lambert Report into the channel's performance in 2002 called upon News 24 to develop a better brand of its own, to allow viewers to differentiate between itself and similar channels such as Sky News. As a direct result of this, a brand new style across all presentation for the channel launched on 8 December 2003 at 09:00. Philip Hayton and Anna Jones were the first two presenters on the set, the relaunch of which had been put back a week due to previous power disruptions at Television Centre where the channel was based. The new designs also featured a dynamic set of titles for the channel; the globe would begin spinning from where the main story was taking place, while the headline scrolled around in a ribbon; this was occasionally replaced by the BBC News logo. The titles concluded with a red globe surrounded by a red stylised clamshell and BBC News ribbons forming above the BBC News logo.

Bulletins on BBC One moved into a new set in January 2003 although retained the previous ivory Lambie-Nairn titles until February 2004. News 24 updated the title colours slightly to match those of BBC One bulletins in time for the 50th anniversary of BBC television news on 5 July 2004.

=== Countdown sequence ===
The countdown since 2005 has shown the elements of journalism and production involved in bringing news stories to air.

An important part of the channel's presentation since launch has been the top of the hour countdown sequence, since there is no presentation system with continuity announcers so the countdown provides a link to the beginning of the next hour. A similar musical device is used on BBC Radio 5 Live, and mirrors the pips on BBC Radio 4.

Previous styles have included a series of fictional flags set to music between 1997 and 1999 before the major relaunch, incorporating the new contemporary music composed by David Lowe, and graphics developed by Lambie-Nairn. Various images, originally ivory numbers fully animated against a deep red background, were designed to fit the pace of the channel, and the music soon gained notoriety, and was often satirised and parodied in popular culture. Images of life around the UK were added in replacement later with the same music, together with footage of the newsroom and exterior of Television Centre. The 2003 relaunch saw a small change to this style with less of a metropolitan feel to the footage.

A new sequence was introduced on 28 March 2005, designed and created by Red Bee Media and directed by Mark Chaudoir. The full version ran for 60 seconds, though only around 30 seconds were usually shown on air. The music was revised completely but the biggest change came in the footage used – reflecting the methods and nature of newsgathering, while a strong emphasis was placed on the BBC logo itself. Satellite dishes are shown transmitting and receiving red "data streams". In production of the countdown sequence, Clive Norman filmed images around the United Kingdom, Richard Jopson in the United States, while BBC News camerapeople filmed images from Iraq, Beijing (Tiananmen Square), Bund of Shanghai, Africa, as well as areas affected by the 2004 Asian tsunami and others.

The sequence has since seen several remixes to the music and a change in visuals to focus more on the well-known journalists, with less footage of camera crews and production teams. Changes have also seen the channel logo included during the sequences and at the end, as well as the fonts used for the time. The conclusion of the countdown was altered in 2008 to feature the new presentation style, rather than a data stream moving in towards the camera. Also in 2008, the graphic for the countdown changed, resembling the BBC One Rhythm and Movement idents, due to the logo being in a red square in the bottom left corner.

To coincide with the move of BBC News to Broadcasting House, on 18 March 2013 the countdown was updated again along with several other presentation elements. Three of the most striking features of the new countdown include music performed by the BBC Concert Orchestra, a redesign of the "data streams" and the ending of the sequence no longer fading to the BBC News globe and logo, but instead stopping with a time-lapse shot outside the corporation's headquarters. The countdown was also extended to 87 seconds, which was fully shown before the first hour from Broadcasting House. In 2019, the countdown started using the BBC's new Reith font but otherwise retained the same style.

A full three-minute version of the countdown music was made available on BBC News Online and David Lowe's own website after a remix on 16 May 2006.

An international version of the countdown was launched on BBC World News on 5 September 2005 featuring more international content and similar music. Various changes have been made to the music and visuals since then, with presentation following the style of BBC News. The visuals in the sequence were updated on 10 May 2010. In June 2011, further imagery was added relating to recent events, including the conflict in Libya and views of outside 10 Downing Street. In January 2013, as part of the relocation of BBC News to Broadcasting House in Central London, BBC World News received a new countdown in the same style as the BBC News Channel's updated countdown, with some minor differences.

In April 2021, a new "sombre" version of the countdown was played, with no "data streams" and slower shots of places within the UK, or in the case of the international version, timelapse shots across the world. Both were introduced to run up to programmes immediately following the death of Prince Philip, Duke of Edinburgh, and were used again following the death of Queen Elizabeth II in 2022.

To coincide with the integration of BBC World News into BBC News, the countdown sequence was slightly refreshed in April 2023 to follow the new "Chameleon" branding scheme used by BBC television since October 2021, with the countdown now centred between the BBC and "News" wordmarks at the top- and bottom-centre of the screen respectively.

== Viewing audience figures ==
The Daily Telegraph reported in November 2021, "BBC News reaches 370,000 for its best performing slots".

== See also ==
- List of news television channels
- List of world news channels
