= Ritula Shah =

British radio presenter (born 1967)

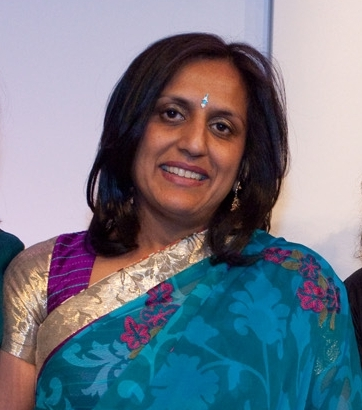
- Shah at the Asian Women of Achievement Awards in 2011
- Born: 1967 (age 58–59); Barnet, London, England
- Education: Haberdashers' Aske's School for Girls, Elstree; University of Warwick
- Occupations: Journalist and broadcaster
- Notable credit(s): The World Tonight; PM

Ritula Harakchand Shah /rɪtəˈlɑː ˈʃɑː/ (born 1967) is a presenter on Classic FM. She was formerly a news presenter on BBC Radio, serving as the main presenter of The World Tonight on BBC Radio 4. Previously, Shah presented Woman's Hour on Radio 4 and was a launch presenter for The World Today on the BBC World Service.

Shah joined The World Tonight as Deputy Presenter and also presented the Saturday edition of PM. From the departure of Robin Lustig in December 2012 until 27 February 2023, Shah was the lead presenter of The World Tonight. It was announced on 13 April 2023 that Shah was to join Classic FM from BBC Radio 4 to present Calm Classics on weekdays between 10pm and 1am. She made her debut on the music station on 17 April 2023.

== Life ==
Ritula Harakhchand Shah was born in 1967 in Barnet, North London. She was educated at Haberdashers' Aske's School for Girls, Elstree, before studying history at the University of Warwick and graduating in 1988. She joined the Radio 4 production team, moved from there to regional television news, and then to Today in 1991 as a producer. When The World Today launched on the BBC World Service in 1999, Shah became one of its presenters. She was a presenter on the BBC World Service's The Real Story.

In May 2013, she began a series of eight episodes in the BBC Radio 4 One to One series of interviews. As she belongs to a Jain family (the Jain religion is concerned with renunciation), the subjects of her interviews are people whose life has involved renunciation.

Media offices
Preceded by Robin Lustig	Main presenter: The World Tonight; 2013 – 2023	Succeeded by Various
Preceded by Claire Bolderson	Deputy presenter: The World Tonight; 2009 – 2012	Succeeded by David Eades; Carolyn Quinn
