= The Real Story =

The Real Story may refer to:

- The Real Story (novel), a 1991 science fiction novel by Stephen R. Donaldson
- The Real Story (TV program), an American current affairs television program
- The Real Story (radio programme), a radio programme on the BBC World Service
- The Real Story (album), a 1996 album by Sylvia
- Hoffa: The Real Story, a 1975 autobiography by Jimmy Hoffa and Oscar Fraley
- Rani: The Real Story, a 2023 Indian Malayalam-language film

== See also ==
- Real Story, a British current affairs TV programme
