= Reuben Wells Leonard =

Canadian soldier and civil engineer

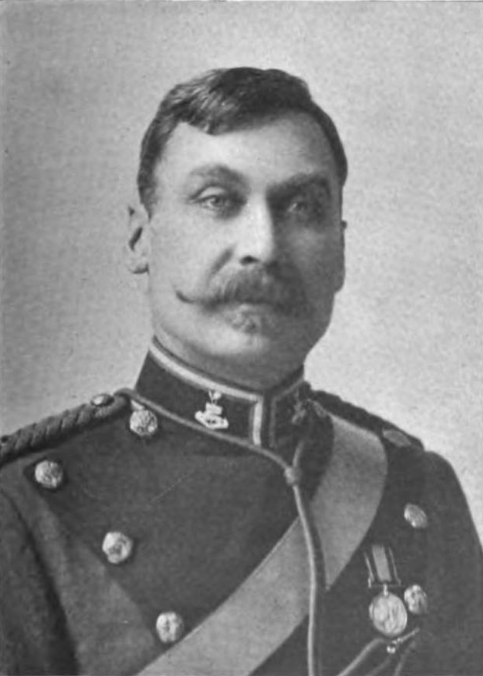
- Born: 21 February 1860; Brantford, Canada West
- Died: 17 December 1930 (aged 70) St. Catharines, Ontario
- Allegiance: Canada
- Branch: Corps of Guides
- Rank: Lieutenant-Colonel
- Conflicts: Northwest Rebellion (1885)
- Other work: Soldier, civil engineer, railroad and mining executive, and philanthropist.

Lieutenant-Colonel Reuben Wells Leonard (21 February 1860 – 17 December 1930) was a Canadian soldier, civil engineer, railroad and mining executive, and philanthropist.

== Life and career ==
Reuben Wells Leonard was born in Brantford, Canada West, on 21 February 1860. He obtained a degree in civil engineering from the Royal Military College of Canada in Kingston, Ontario, and began working for the Canadian Pacific Railway. He joined the Corps of Guides in 1904. In 1905, he obtained mining rights to a productive claim in Cobalt, Ontario. Coniagas Mines Limited and Coniagas Reduction Company Limited were established by him to mine and refine the mineral, respectively.

In 1911, he was named chairman of the National Transcontinental Railway Concern, the forerunner of the Canadian National Railways. He oversaw construction of the railway from Moncton, New Brunswick, to Winnipeg, Manitoba. Leonard was the namesake of the train ferry S.S. Leonard, built in 1914 by Cammell Laird to provide service pending completion of the Quebec Bridge. During World War I, he served in Europe with the Corps of Guides. He was promoted Lieutenant-Colonel in September 1915.

He was president of the Engineering Institute of Canada in 1919–20. He served on the Canadian Battlefields Memorials Commission and on the boards of several colleges and universities, including Khaki University, the University of Toronto, Wycliffe College, Toronto, and Ridley College.

== Philanthropy ==
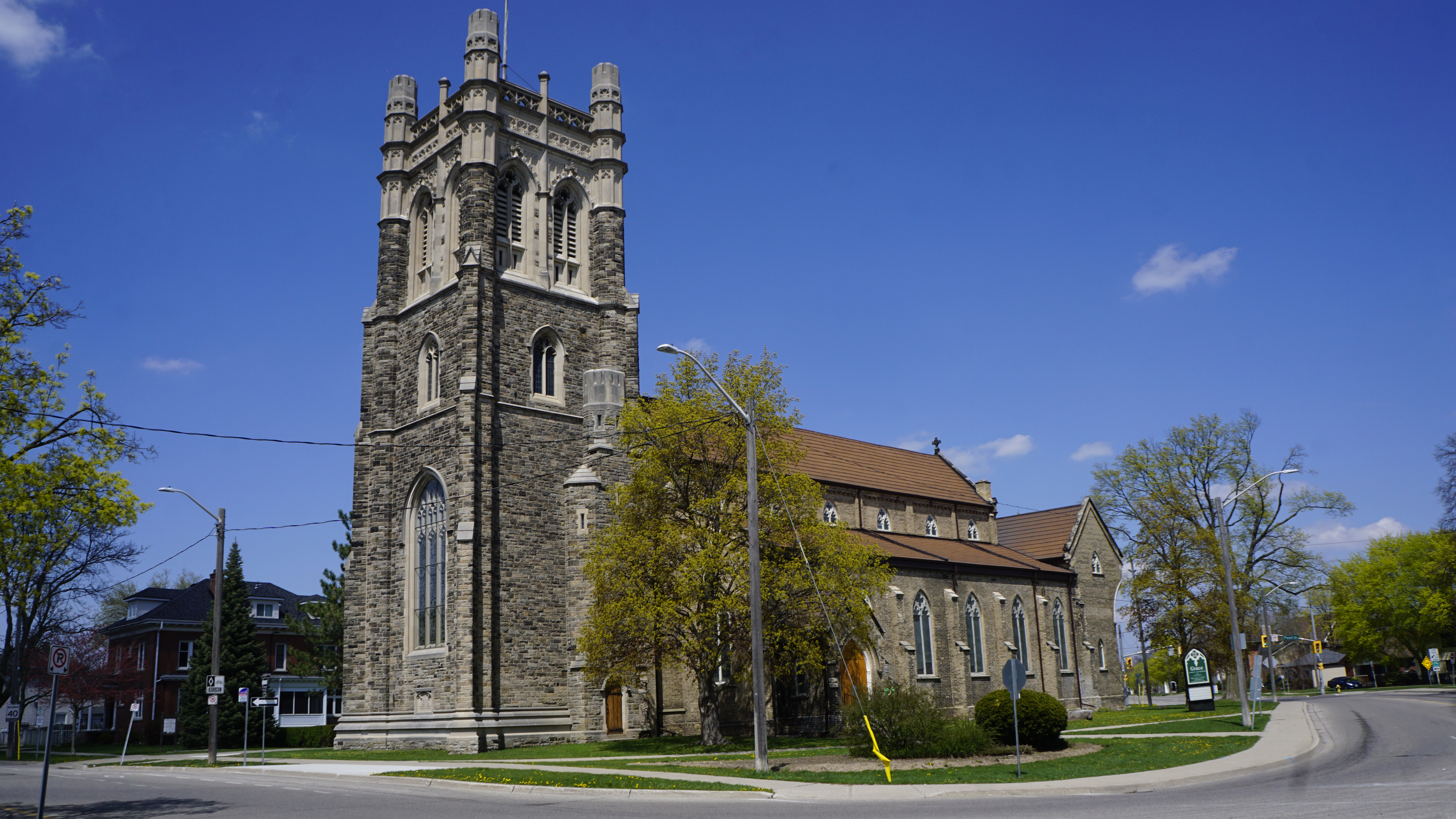
Grace Anglican Church with the bell tower

In 1913, he gave $40,000 to his church in Brantford, Ontario, to build a bell tower in memory of his parents

In 1916, he established an educational trust. Under its provisions, bursaries could only be granted to white British Protestant students, and only a quarter of each year's grant money could be awarded to women. These terms were challenged in court in 1986, and in 1990 were adjudged by the Court of Appeal for Ontario to be illegal.

Leonard also made donations to Queen's University, the University of Toronto, scouting organizations, and many others. After World War I, he donated Chatham House, Number 10 St James's Square, a Grade I listed 18th-century house in London, to the Royal Institute of International Affairs.

Leonard was also responsible for the founding of a scholarship offered only to White, Protestant, British individuals. The scholarship explicitly excluded others, and its legal basis was scrutinized in Canada Trust Co v Ontario (Human Rights Commission) at the Ontario Court of Appeal.

== Honours ==
Queen’s University conferred an honorary doctorate in October 1930. Leonard Reef, St. Joseph Channel, Algoma District was named in his honour. In 1923, he donated land to Queen's University, on which Leonard Hall and Leonard Field were named in his honour. There is also a Leonard Township in the Timiskaming District, Ontario.

Reuben Wells Leonard died in St. Catharines on 17 December 1930.
