= Talking Book (disambiguation) =

Talking Book or Talking books may refer to:

- Talking book, also known as an audiobook
- Talking Book, an album by Stevie Wonder
- Talking Book (Macy Gray album), a 2012 Macy Gray album in which she covered all of the songs from the Stevie Wonder album
- Talking Books (Books for the Blind), a US project which provides free recordings of books to the visually impaired
- Talking Books (BBC radio program), a BBC radio program hosted by Razia Iqbal
- Talking Books (Canadian radio program), a Canadian radio program hosted by Ian Brown
- The Talking Book, an album by Billy Gould
