= Razia Iqbal =

Ugandan journalist (born 1962)

- Born: 1962 (age 63–64); Kampala, Uganda
- Education: University of East Anglia
- Occupations: Journalist, presenter
- Notable credit: Newshour
- Spouse: George Arney (divorced)

Razia Iqbal (born 1962) is a Ugandan journalist. She was most recently employed by BBC News as a special correspondent, reporting for outlets across the BBC. From 2011 to 2023, Iqbal also presented Newshour on the BBC World Service. She has also presented Talking Books on the BBC News Channel. She was previously the corporation's arts correspondent.

== Early life ==
Iqbal was born into a Punjabi family in Kampala, Uganda, in 1962.

== Education ==
Iqbal was educated at Garrett Green Comprehensive School in Tooting, South London, followed by the University of East Anglia, from which she graduated with a BA in American Studies in 1985. During her time at UEA she spent a year abroad at Trinity College, Connecticut.

== Life and career ==
Iqbal is a former arts correspondent for BBC News, regularly appearing in news bulletins to report on arts related stories.

She has also hosted the BBCs HARDtalk Extra programme, interviewing prominent figures from the arts, including Sting and Jacqueline Wilson.

In 2009, Iqbal applied for the Arts Editor position with BBC News but the role went to Will Gompertz.

Iqbal has reported on mainstream news items for BBC News. One of the first of these was an investigation into a charity scam following the earthquake in Haiti in January 2010.

In mid-2010, Iqbal presented relief shifts on the BBC News Channel, as well as presenting Talking Books on the channel. From 2011 to 2023, Iqbal was also a regular presenter of Newshour on the BBC World Service. She made her final broadcast on Wednesday, 12 July 2023.

In spring 2022, Iqbal took a sabbatical from the BBC to take up a six-month post as a Ferris Visiting Journalism Professor at Princeton University, where she taught a class on journalism with a focus on international news. She presented a range of YouTube discussions during that period on the Russian Invasion of Ukraine.

She left the BBC in July 2023, rejoining Princeton as Visiting Professor and Lecturer in School of Public and International Affairs.

== Awards and nominations ==
In January 2013, Iqbal was nominated for the Services to Media award at the British Muslim Awards.

== Personal life ==
Iqbal is separated from husband George Arney, a presenter of The World Today.
