= Claire Bolderson =

British broadcast journalist

- Education: St Hilda's College, Oxford
- Occupations: Journalist, presenter
- Notable credit: Newshour

Claire Bolderson is a former BBC journalist and radio broadcaster who presented The World Tonight for BBC Radio 4.

== Career ==
Bolderson was born in London. After studying at St Hilda's College, Oxford and graduating with a degree in Philosophy, Politics and Economics, Bolderson started broadcasting from Indonesia as a reporter for the BBC and the Financial Times. Later, posted in Washington, Bolderson covered the 1996 US Election for the BBC World Service, then the Clinton impeachment.

Later, Bolderson returned to London to present on the BBC World Service and BBC Radio 4. She regularly presented The World Tonight from 1999 to 2009. She then concentrated on Newshour. Bolderson left the BBC in 2012, presenting her final edition of Newshour on 20 March 2012.

Media offices
Preceded by Isabel Hilton	Deputy presenter: The World Tonight; 1999 – 2009	Succeeded by Ritula Shah
