= Islam Issa =

Islam Issa may refer to:

- Islam Issa (footballer) (born 1996), Egyptian footballer
- Islam Issa (academic), British scholar and author
