= The World Tonight =

British current affairs radio programme

- Genre: News; current events; factual
- Running time: 45 minutes
- Country of origin: United Kingdom
- Language: English
- Home station: BBC Radio 4 BBC Sounds (2024–present)
- Hosted by: James Coomarasamy; Jane Hill; Shaun Ley
- Edited by: Jo Floto
- Recording studio: BBC Television Centre (1970–2012); Broadcasting House (2012–present)
- Original release: 6 April 1970 – present

The World Tonight is a British current affairs radio programme broadcast on BBC Radio 4 every weeknight, which started out as an extension of the 10 pm news. It is produced by BBC News and features news, analysis and comment on domestic and world issues. James Coomarasamy is the main presenter, usually presenting the first three days of the week.

In the past, the programme utilised other BBC broadcasters, including David Eades, Carolyn Quinn, Roger Hearing to regularly present on Thursdays and Fridays. The programme was presented on Mondays, Tuesdays and Wednesdays by Ritula Shah until 27 February 2023. Between 1989 and 2012, the main presenter was Robin Lustig.

On 17 June 2026, the BBC announced that as part of a series of cuts to its news division, The World Tonight would be cancelled from 2027 after 56 years of broadcasting. It will be replaced by sister BBC World Service programme Newshour, produced by the same team.

== History ==
The World Tonight was first broadcast on 6 April 1970, starting on the same day as PM. It was introduced following the changes at Broadcasting House which ushered in Radio 1, to create "the serious current affairs programme of the day" on the new Radio 4, as one survivor recalls.

Broadcast live at 10 pm, initially for only thirty minutes, its tone was set by presenter Douglas Stuart, a former Washington and Bonn correspondent for the BBC. The first edition contained interviews on Northern Ireland and relations between West Germany and the United States. Later that week, ideas for better government in Scotland and peace in the Middle East were featured.

Its focus on international news was set early on by events in Washington surrounding Watergate. The US time zone (five hours behind the UK) meant that the programme could bring up to the minute developments at 10 pm. Its first reporters came from within the ranks of the programme's own producers, which meant that packages or features were cut from a different cloth than standard news reports.

Presenters with strong journalistic credentials, including John Tusa, Anthony Howard, Richard Kershaw, Isabel Hilton and Robin Lustig, have secured and maintained the programme's reputation for authoritative coverage.

Other notable former staffers include Dominic Lawson, former editor of The Sunday Telegraph, Jim Gray, former editor of Channel 4 News, Jonathan Freedland of The Guardian, and Henry Kelly.

Veterans recall the traditionally "relaxed" figure of the editor. The laissez faire approach of the boss over the years created a culture in which Output Editors, responsible for daily editions, were able to take risks, some of which have led to notable scoops, such as the predicted arrest on war crimes charges of General Augusto Pinochet in 1998.

A staple of the Radio 4 schedule for over four decades, 2013 figures showed The World Tonight has retained 1.75 million listeners, representing 17.8% of the national radio audience at 10 pm.

== In popular culture ==
- In the 1968 science fiction film 2001: A Space Odyssey, The World Tonight is depicted as a television news programme on channel "BBC-12". During the programme, a reporter named Martin Amer (played by actor Mike Lovell) interviews the crew of Discovery-1 on a voyage to Jupiter. The overall host of the show, who leads into the interview segment, is played by Kenneth Kendall.
- In the first ever episode of BBC comedy programme The Thick of It, Secretary of State for Social Affairs, Hugh Abbott (played by actor Chris Langham), speaks live to presenter Robin Lustig on The World Tonight late after office hours, in order to try to rectify a blunder that has played out across the day regarding the multiple U-turns on whether or not they are announcing the department's new "Anti-Benefit Fraud Executive" (colloquially named "Snooper Force"). Abbott, however, worsens the situation by panicking and calling it the "Sponge Avengers", and then having the interview drowned out by a nearby cleaner who is hoovering.

== Presenters ==
=== Current ===
Years	Presenter	Current Role
?–present	James Coomarasamy	Main presenter (Monday–Wednesday)
2023–present	Jane Hill	Presenter (Thursday)
?–present	Shaun Ley	Presenter (Friday)
?–present	Gabriel Gatehouse	Occasional presenters
?–present	Julian Worricker	Occasional presenters
?–present	James Menendez	Occasional presenters
?–present	Rajini Vaidyanathan	Occasional presenters
?–present	Krupa Padhy	Occasional presenters

=== Past ===
- Ritula Shah – regular presenter (2009 – February 27 2023); main presenter (2012–?)
- Jackie Hardgrave
- Claire Bolderson – regular presenter (1999–2009)
- Julian Worricker – occasional presenter
- Isabel Hilton – main presenter (1995–1998)
- Harriet Cass
- David Sells
- Richard Kershaw
- Robin Lustig – main presenter (1989–2012)
- Alexander Macleod
- Anthony Howard
- John Morgan
- John Tusa
- Douglas Stuart
- Justin Webb – 1997–1998
- David Eades – ?–2023
- Carolyn Quinn – ?–2023
- Chris Mason – 2015–?

== Editors ==
- Roger Sawyer
- Alistair Burnett
- David Stevenson (acting editor for 2 years)
- Prue Keely
- Prue Keely & Jenni Russell (joint editors)
- Ann Koch
- Margaret Budy
- Blair Thompson
- Ken Goudie
- Jonathan Fenton-Fischer

== Reporters ==
=== Past ===
- Beth McLeod
- Paul Moss
- Jonty Bloom, The World Tonight's economics and Europe correspondent.
- Janet Cohen, Reporter World Tonight (1979–1981, 1983–2006)
- Sally Hardcastle
- John Schofield
- Rachel Johnson
- Henry Kelly
- John Egan

== Awards ==
- In 2011, The World Tonight was nominated for a Sony award for Best News & Current Affairs Programme.
- In 2009, Jonty Bloom won the Royal Statistical Society award for Statistical Excellence in Journalism.
- In 2006, Paul Moss won the Foreign Press Association's award for Environment Story of the Year for his reports on the environmental impact of India's economic growth.
- In 2004 and 2006, Jonty Bloom's reporting on business and economics won the World Tonight the Wincott Foundation award, for radio programme of the year.
- In 1998, Robin Lustig won a Sony Silver award as Talk/News Broadcaster of the Year.
- In 1995, Janet Cohen won a Sony Bronze Award as Radio Reporter of the Year for work covering the 1994 US Midterm Elections, the Refugee Crisis in former Yugoslavia and the Anniversary of the D-Day landings in 1944.
- In 1994, Janet Cohen won a New York Festivals Finalist Award for her programme, Seeing Red With The Boys in Blue, on sexual discrimination in the Police Service.
- In 1992, Robin Lustig was awarded a gold medal at the New York Radio Festival for a special edition of The World Tonight broadcast live from Moscow on the last day of the Soviet Union.
- In 1990, Janet Cohen was nominated for a BP Arts Journalism Award for work on the ethics of restoring antique monuments.

== See also ==
- Today – early morning equivalent of The World Tonight.
- The World At One – lunchtime equivalent of The World Tonight.
- PM, – early evening equivalent to The World Tonight.
- Newshour – sister programme produced by the same team on the BBC World Service.
