= Islam Issa (academic) =

British writer and literary scholar

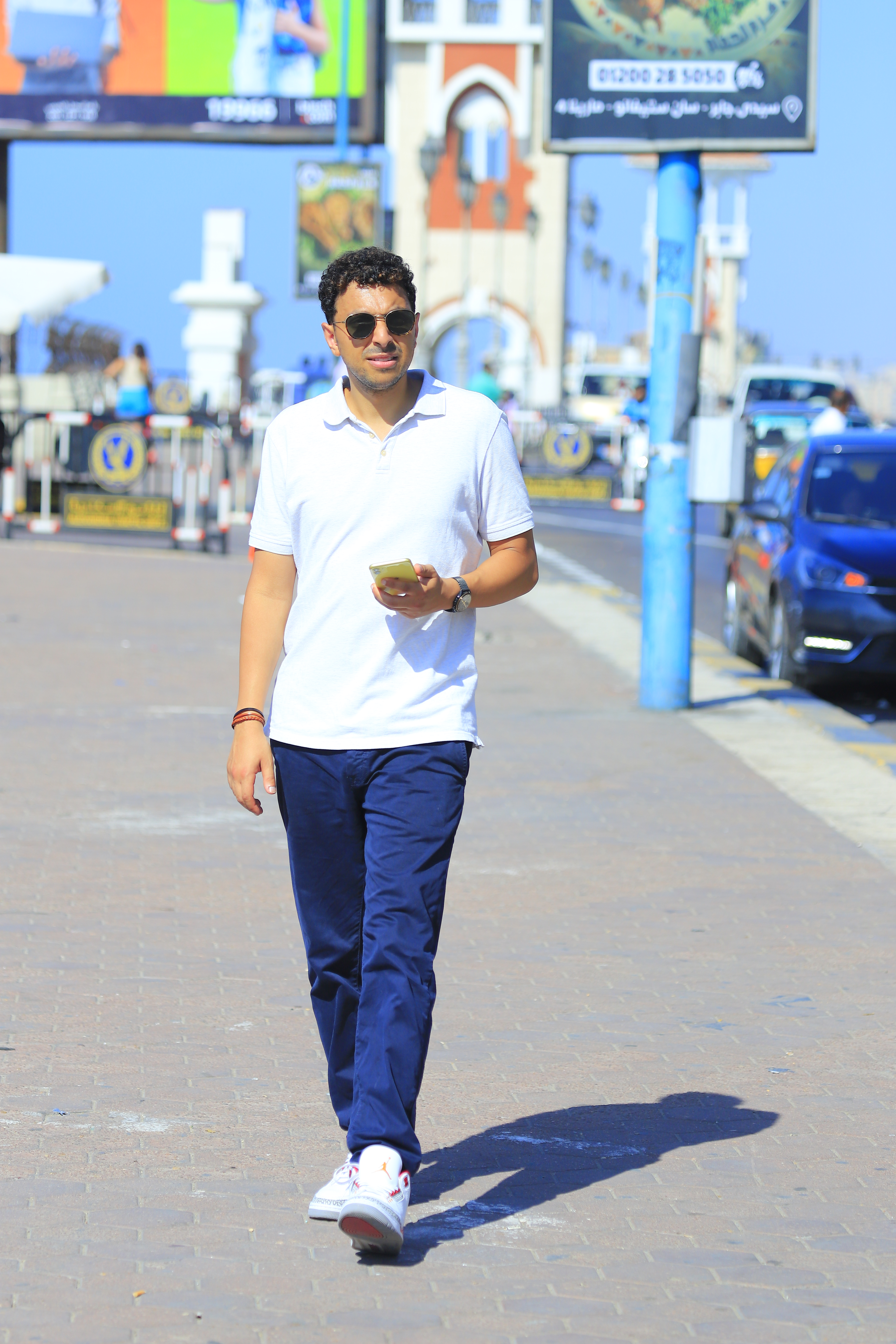
- Education: University of Birmingham
- Scientific career
- Fields: History, Literary Criticism, Sports

Islam Issa is an Egyptian-British scholar, author and broadcaster, a Professor of Literature and History at Birmingham City University whose research has specialized in early modern English literature and the reception of Renaissance.

Issa was named by the BBC as "one of the UK's most significant new thinkers". CBC described Issa as "an Egyptian icon".

== Career ==
Issa graduated as a Doctor of Philosophy in English Literature from the University of Birmingham, where he was then a Visiting Lecturer and Fellow until he became a lecturer at the Birmingham City University in 2015.

Issa has a media presence, with appearances on over fifty radio and television stations around the world. He has also given public lectures overseas, including work for the British Foreign Office. In 2017, the BBC named him as one of its New Generation Thinkers, one of ten academics whose research was to be made into radio and television programmes. In 2012, according to The Observer, Issa disclosed that two Egyptian soccer stars believed that the Port Said Stadium riot had been planned.

In 2016, Issa published research into the First World War which stated that “at least 885,000 Muslims were recruited by the Allies”, with the Discovery Channel noting that “Issa more than doubled the previously estimated figure of 400,000 soldiers after trawling through thousands of personal letters, historic archives, regimental diaries and census reports”. The findings came as he was curating the “first exhibition devoted to the Islamic contribution to World War I”. The exhibition was visited and praised by King Charles III.

== Media ==
In 2019, Issa presented the BBC Four television documentary Cleopatra and Me: In Search of a Lost Queen. He featured in Art That Made Us on BBC Two and Jada Pinkett Smith's Cleopatra on Netflix, for which the New York Post named him the "star" of the show.

He has presented BBC Radio 4's Free Thinking and four Sunday Feature documentaries on BBC Radio 3, in addition to the BBC podcasts Arts and Ideas, the Radio 3 Documentary and the Shakespeare Sessions. For the BBC, he has appeared on television shows including Newsnight, Have Your Say, The Hub, Midlands Today and BBC News Arabic. He has been a guest on radio shows including BBC Radio 4's Front Row, Free Thinking and PM; BBC Radio 3's Drama on 3, Music Planet, The Essay, Words and Music; BBC Radio 5 Live's Up All Night and 5 Live Drive; BBC World Service's Newsday and Have Your Say; BBC Asian Network's Big Debate and Reports; and BBC Arabic Radio.

Outside the UK, Issa has appeared on television and radio in Algeria, Australia, Canada, Egypt, France, Ireland, New Zealand, Qatar, Saudi Arabia, South Africa, Turkey and the USA. In Egypt, he has been a guest on television channels including AlHadath Alyoum, Al-Hayah, CBC, Channel 2, Egyptian Satellite Channel, Hya, Modern, Nile Cinema and Nile Culture.

Issa has written for BBC History Magazine, BBC Online, The Guardian, The Guardian Weekly, The Independent, Al Jazeera, New Statesman, NOX Magazine, Times Higher Education and The Times Literary Supplement.

== Awards and nominations ==
Issa's book Alexandria: The City That Changed the World was awarded the Runciman Award. Alexandria was also shortlisted for the London Hellenic Prize.

Issa won the Research Project of the Year at the Times Higher Education awards.

Issa's book Milton in the Arab-Muslim World won the Outstanding First Book award of the Milton Society of America. He has also been named as Birmingham City University's Researcher of the Year.

He is a winner of the Excellence in Community Relations at The Muslim News Awards and two-time finalist for Services to Education at the British Muslim Awards.

== Publications ==
- Milton in the Arab-Muslim World (2016).
- Alexandria: The City That Changed the World (2023).
