= Tim Franks =

British journalist and radio presenter

- Born: Timothy Henry Franks; 14 May 1968 (age 58); Moseley, Birmingham, Warwickshire, England
- Citizenship: British
- Occupations: Journalist, presenter
- Years active: 1989–present
- Employer: BBC News
- Notable credit: Newshour
- Children: 3
- Website: https://tim-franks.com/

Timothy Henry Franks (born 14 May 1968) is a British journalist and radio presenter who presents Newshour, the flagship news and current affairs programme on BBC World Service radio. He also, from time to time, presents Hardtalk on BBC World News, and documentaries across BBC TV and radio. He was previously an award-winning foreign correspondent for the BBC.

== Early career ==
He joined the BBC in 1990, as a BBC World Service production trainee, and spent five years as a producer, reporter and part-time presenter. In 1995, he was appointed World Service Political Reporter, based at Westminster, and then World Service Political Correspondent in 1997. He covered not just British politics but events in Northern Ireland, including the breakdown of the IRA ceasefire in 1996, civil disorder over the Parades in Northern Ireland, and the Good Friday Agreement.

In 1999, he became a political correspondent for domestic BBC TV and radio, including a spell as the political correspondent for the Today programme on BBC Radio 4. He also started presenting, from time to time, The World at One and contributing to the arts pages of the New Statesman magazine.

== Foreign correspondent ==
In 2001, Franks became a BBC Foreign Correspondent. His first posting was to Washington, in the six months after the September 11 attacks. In March 2002 he began a five-year tour of duty as Europe Correspondent, based in Brussels. He reported from across Europe, as well as from Iraq during the war of 2003. In 2004, his training for the London Marathon coincided with a month spent in Baghdad. He was also, during this time, used as an occasional presenter on the Today programme. In 2007, he was appointed BBC Middle East Correspondent, based in Jerusalem. He broadcast across the region, but with a particular focus on Israel and the occupied Palestinian territories. His 2008 TV report about witnessing a deadly attack in Jerusalem drew complaints from the public for its graphic nature. In 2009, Franks won a Bayeux-Calvados Award for war correspondents for reporting for his piece on Dr Izzeldin Abuelaish, who lost three daughters in Israel's offensive during the Gaza War. Through his three and a half years in the region, Franks kept a diary, which the BBC regularly published. His valedictory From Our Own Correspondent, which dealt with the relationship between his Jewishness and his journalism, garnered wide attention.

== 2010–2013 ==
In 2010, he returned to London, to take up a role as BBC Sports Correspondent – a position he combined with occasional presenting on Newshour on BBC World Service, Hardtalk on BBC World News, and radio documentaries. In December 2012, his reports for Newshour on the activities of the Greek far right made headlines in Greece.

== Presenter, Newshour ==
In May 2013, he joined Newshour full-time, as the main evening presenter. He continued to present Hardtalk from time to time, along with documentaries on TV and radio. In November 2013, Franks secured the first broadcast interview since Lance Armstrong's "limited confession" to doping in January 2013 with Oprah Winfrey.
