= The World Today (radio programme) =

BBC World Service radio programme

- Genre: News, current events, and factual
- Running time: Daily 0300-0830 (GMT)(from Spring 2011)
- Country of origin: United Kingdom
- Language: English
- Home station: BBC World Service
- Recording studio: Bush House (1999-June 2012); Broadcasting House (June/July 2012)
- Original release: 1999 – 20 July 2012
- Website: www.bbc.co.uk/programmes/p002vsn9

The World Today was an early morning news and current affairs radio programme on the BBC World Service, launched in 1999, and broadcast from 03:00 to 08:30 (GMT).

The World Today consisted of news bulletins on the hour and half-hour, interviews, analysis, and in-depth reports of world news. The World Service considered it one of their most important strands.

In 2009, the programme won the News and Current Affairs Award at the Sony Radio Academy Awards. The judges noted that the programme "bubbled over with stories of real life from around the globe" and that "the compassion, respect and understanding the programme had for every contributor shone through every minute of the competition entry."

Both The World Today and its sister news programme Network Africa ended in 2012, when they were replaced by a new BBC World Service programme entitled Newsday.

== History ==
The World Today was launched on the BBC's World Service in 1999 as part of a shake-up of the news programming. In June 2012 the programme moved to Broadcasting House in central London.

== Presenters ==
Due to the nature of The World Today many BBC personalities appeared on the programme. Core presenters included:

- Durdana Ansari
- George Arney
- Ed Butler
- Komla Dumor
- Tom Hagler
- Pascale Harter
- Roger Hearing
- Julian Keane
- Jackie Leonard
- Sunita Nahar
- Fergus Nicoll
- Max Pearson
- Lawrence Pollard
- Ritula Shah
- Mark Whitaker

== See also ==
- BBC World Service, the home of The World Today
- BBC News
- BBC World News, The BBC's International Television Station
