= Robin Niblett =

British international relations scholar

Sir Robin Niblett KCMG
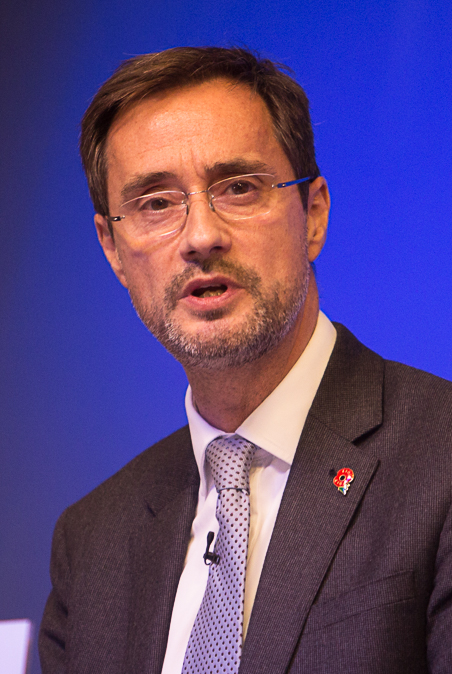
- Born: Robin Christian Howard Niblett; 20 August 1961 (age 65)
- Education: New College, Oxford (BA, MPhil, DPhil)

Sir Robin Christian Howard Niblett KCMG (born 20 August 1961) is a British specialist in international relations. He is a distinguished fellow at Chatham House and at the Asia Society Policy Institute, and a senior adviser at British strategic advisory firm Hakluyt & Company.

He was the director and chief executive of Chatham House, also known as the Royal Institute of International Affairs, for 15 years between 2007 and 2022. He began his tenure as the Warden of New College, Oxford in September 2026.

== Education and personal life ==
Niblett is the son of Alan and Christine Niblett. In 1990, he married Trisha de Borchgrave, daughter of Arnaud de Borchgrave, with whom he has two daughters.

He was educated at Cottesmore School and Charterhouse. He studied at New College, Oxford, and obtained a BA in Modern Languages in 1984, followed by an MPhil in 1993 and DPhil in International Relations in 1995. His doctoral thesis was entitled The European Community and the Central European Three, 1989–92: a study of the Community as an international actor.

== Early career ==
On leaving Oxford, he was a musician 1985–87 (he lists electric guitar among his recreations in Who's Who).

== Center for Strategic and International Studies ==
He was resident associate at the Center for Strategic and International Studies, Washington, DC 1988–91 and their Europe representative 1992–97. He was director, strategic planning, 1997–2000; executive vice-president and chief operating officer, 2001–06. During his last two years at CSIS, he also served as director of the CSIS Europe Program and its Initiative for a Renewed Transatlantic Partnership.

== Chatham House (The Royal Institute of International Affairs) ==
Niblett was appointed director and chief executive of Chatham House in January 2007. His 15-year tenure spanned major world events, from the 2008 financial crisis, the Arab Spring, Brexit, Russia's annexation of Crimea and the invasion of Ukraine.

Over that period, Chatham House tripled in size as an organisation. It now counts more than 200 full-time staff and 150 associate fellows, working across the full range of topics related to international affairs including geopolitics, the energy transition and technology competition.

He announced in October 2021 that he would be stepping down from his role the following year. In April 2022, he was succeeded in the role by Bronwen Maddox. Three months later, in July, he was appointed a distinguished fellow and made a lifetime member by Chatham House’s governing Council, in recognition of his "exceptional service to the institute".

== Other roles ==
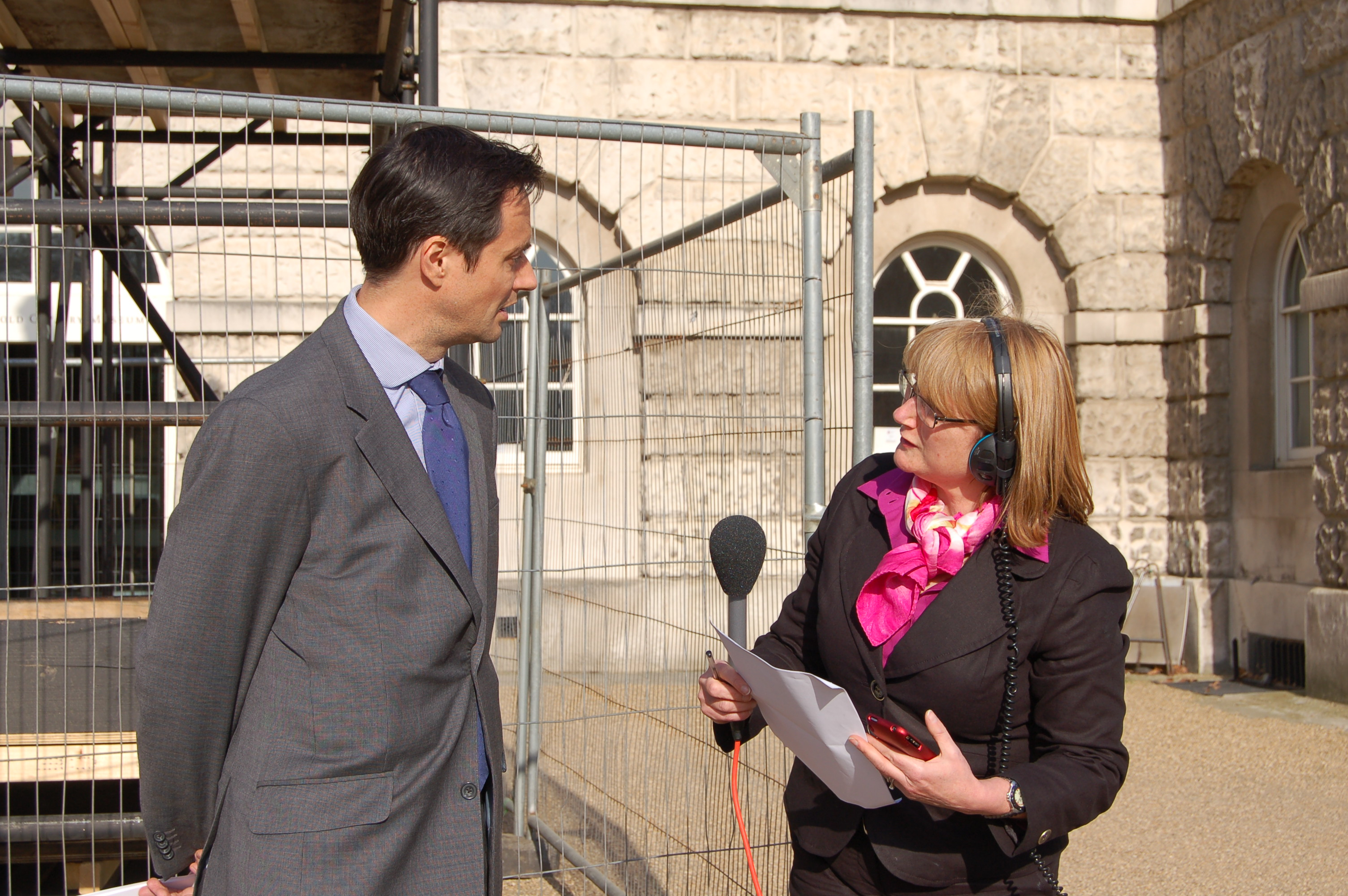
Robin Niblett being interviewed by Carolyn Quinn (2010)

Niblett has participated as a panellist at conferences and events around the world as an expert on transatlantic relations and European order. He has given evidence to the House of Commons Defence Select Committee about the future of NATO and European defence, to the Foreign Affairs Committee about the US-UK relationship and the future of UK government policy towards the European Union, and to the Select Committee on Soft Power and the UK's Influence. He has appeared as an analyst on these topics in major media including the BBC and CNN and has written and commented for prominent newspapers including the Financial Times, Washington Post, The Guardian and the Daily Telegraph.

He is the editor and contributing author of the book America and a Changed World: A Question of Leadership and has edited and co-authored books on transatlantic cooperation and European integration. Most recently he authored a chapter in the book Influencing Tomorrow: Future Challenges for British Foreign Policy.

He has served as a non-executive director of Fidelity European Values Investment Trust since 2010, and is a member and former Chairman of the World Economic Forum's Global Agenda Council on Europe.

He chaired the British Academy forum on language needs for UK public policy making and implementation and is currently Chairman of the Experts Group for the 2014 NATO Summit.

He is a non-resident distinguished fellow at the Asia Society Policy Institute.

Since 2022, he has been a senior adviser on geopolitics and international affairs at the British strategic advisory firm Hakluyt & Company.

In September 2026, he took up the post of Warden of New College, Oxford.

== Honours ==
Niblett was appointed Companion of the Order of St Michael and St George (CMG) in the 2015 New Year Honours for services to promoting the UK as a global centre for foreign policy and Knight Commander of the Order of St Michael and St George (KCMG) in the 2022 Birthday Honours for services to international relations and British foreign policy.
