= Fritz Lustig =

British Army soldier

Fritz Lustig

Fritz Lustig (31 March 1919 – 18 December 2017) was a German-Jewish emigrant to Britain during the Nazi era.

Lustig was born on 31 March 1919. He arrived in the United Kingdom in April 1939. His parents later left Germany for Portugal; his brother, Ted, to the United States, for whom he fought during the war.

He was briefly interned as an "enemy alien", at Peveril Camp, on the Isle of Man, in 1940, following the outbreak of World War II. He then enlisted in the British Army's Pioneer Corps, playing cello in its orchestra, but was transferred to the Combined Services Detailed Interrogation Centre (CSDIC) in 1943, where he eavesdropped on captured Axis officers at Latimer House and Wilton Park in Buckinghamshire, known then as "No 1 Distribution Centre" and "No 2 Distribution Centre" respectively.

After rising to Regimental Sergeant Major, he was demobbed in June 1946. He subsequently worked in accountancy and credit control. He obtained British nationality in May 1947.

While working for CSDIC he met Susan Cohn, also a refugee from Germany. They were married in 1945. She died in 2013. One of their two sons is the broadcaster Robin Lustig. The other is Stephen, a music publisher.

Lustig died on 18 December 2017. Several obituaries were published, including those in The Times, and The Guardian, and one on the BBC Radio 4 programme Last Word.
