= Lake George (Michigan–Ontario) =

Lake on the Canada–United States border (Ontario and Michigan)

- Location of Lake George in Ontario
- Location: Algoma District, Ontario, Canada
- Coordinates: 46°24′23″N 84°07′11″W
- Type: Lake
- Part of: Great Lakes Basin
- Primary inflows: St. Marys River
- Max. length: 16 km (9.9 mi)
- Max. width: 7 km (4.3 mi)
- Surface elevation: 176 m (577 ft)

Lake George is a lake in Chippewa County, Michigan, United States, and Algoma District, Northwestern Ontario, Canada, that lies between Sugar Island in Michigan on the west and the Ontario mainland on the east.

The lake is in the Great Lakes Basin and is part of Lake Huron and the St. Marys River. The primary inflow is the river arriving from Little Lake George at the north, and the primary outflow is the East Neebish Channel to the St. Joseph Channel at the south.

== Tributaries ==
Clockwise from mouth

- In Michigan
  - Rock Bottom Creek (right)
  - Wilmar Creek (right)
- In Ontario
  - Bar River (left)
  - Echo River (left)

== See also ==
- List of lakes in Michigan
- List of lakes in Ontario
