= Krupa Padhy =

British journalist and broadcaster

Krupa Padhy is a British journalist and broadcaster. She presents on the BBC World Service and BBC Radio 4, and has also reported for Panorama. She specialises in global news and modern family life.

== Background ==
Padhy was raised in a Gujarati-speaking household in Greenford, London. Her parents moved to the UK in the 1970s. Padhy attended Brentside High School. She holds an undergraduate degree from the University of Warwick and a master's degree from the London School of Economics and Political Science.

== Career ==
Padhy worked in international development before joining the BBC.

Padhy's first job at the BBC was as a trainee journalist on Today. As of 2010, Padhy has produced and presented several different programmes on the BBC World Service. Starting in 2012, Padhy has contributed several pieces to From Our Own Correspondent. Padhy currently presents Weekend, Outside Source and Newshour. In the early or mid-2010s, Padhy began presenting on BBC World News, where she continued to present after the channel's merger with the domestic BBC News channel. Padhy has presented many documentaries for the BBC; for example, in 2018, Padhy presented a short series of documentaries on the BBC World Service which looked at scientific advancements in relation to human procreation. In 2021, a series presented by Padhy about Indian immigrants from East Africa to the UK was broadcast on BBC Radio 4. Starting in 2021, Padhy is an occasional presenter of Woman's Hour on BBC Radio 4. As of 2021, Padhy continued to edit programmes, in addition to her on-air and production work. Padhy also presents The World Tonight on BBC Radio 4.

In 2020, Padhy won the Media award at the Asian Women of Achievement Awards.

Padhy has also several written pieces for the BBC website, including a 2024 piece about people embracing their stutter. Her writing focuses on society, women and children's affairs.

== Personal life ==
In 2013, Padhy's first child died at the age of 9 hours old because of medical negligence at a London hospital. Krupa takes a keen interest in maternity safety and children's welfare.

In a 2025 article offering advice to new parents, Padhy said that it is natural to feel extreme emotions of love and angst while parenting, and that all these that parents often experience are valid.
