= The Real Story (radio programme) =

- Other names: Newshour Extra
- Genre: News, current events, and factual
- Country of origin: United Kingdom
- Language: English
- Home station: BBC World Service
- Hosted by: Carrie Gracie (2018–present); Owen Bennett-Jones (formerly)
- Original release: 5 December 2014 (as Newshour Extra) – 29 March 2024
- Website: https://www.bbc.co.uk/programmes/p02dbd4m

The Real Story is a radio programme hosted by Carrie Gracie on the BBC World Service. Each episode of the weekly programme covers one topic in-depth for 50 minutes, featuring a panel of experts. The programme aired from

Prior to 22 February 2018, the programme was known as Newshour Extra, and was hosted by Newshour host Owen Bennett-Jones. The programme was aired for the last time on 29 March 2024.
