= James Coomarasamy =

British presenter

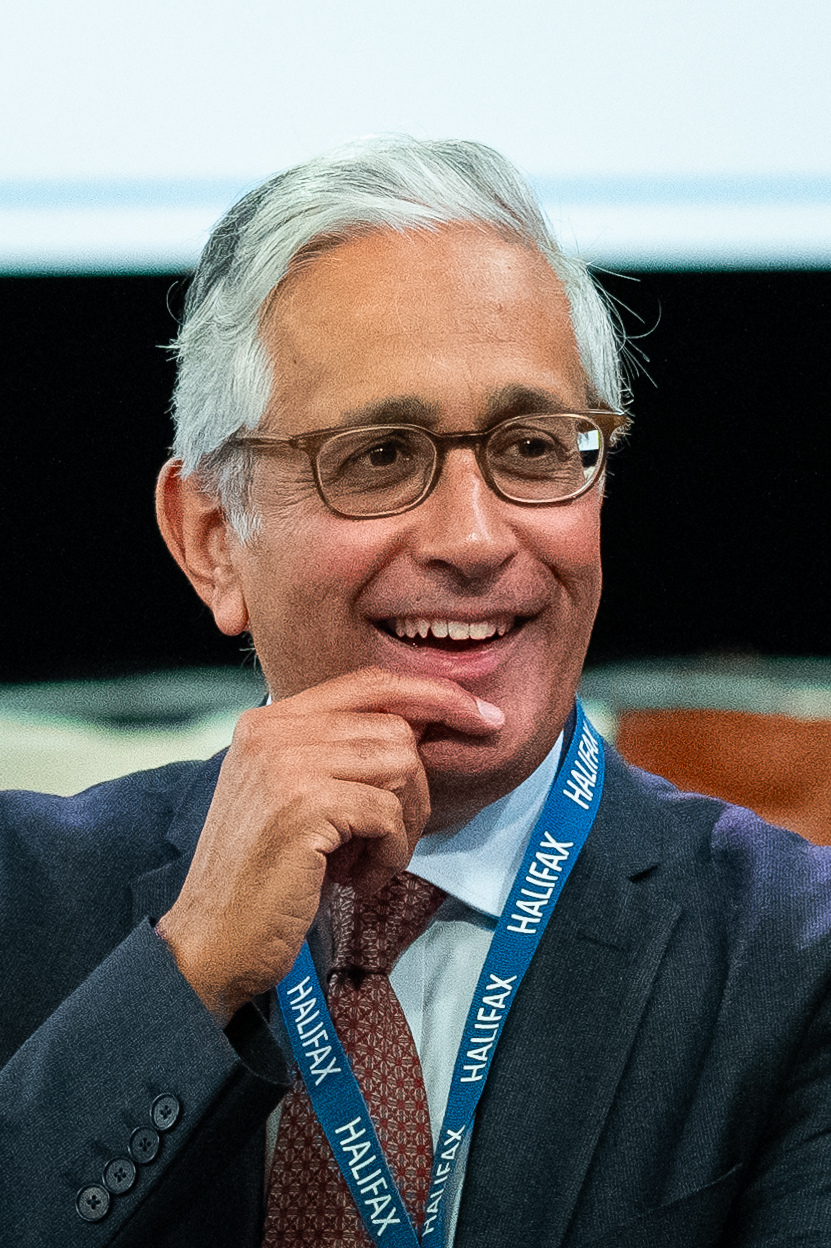
- Born: 5 May 1967 (age 59)
- Education: University of Cambridge
- Employer: BBC
- Known for: News broadcaster
- Partner: Nanette van der Laan

James Coomarasamy is a British presenter of the BBC Radio 4 evening programme The World Tonight and the flagship Newshour programme on the BBC World Service.

Before joining Newshour in 2010, Coomarasamy spent a year presenting the Europe Today. Before becoming a presenter he had been a BBC correspondent in Warsaw, followed by Paris, then Washington, D.C.

== Early life ==
Coomarasamy was educated at Christ's Hospital, an independent school for boys, near Horsham, West Sussex, followed by Trinity Hall, Cambridge, where he studied modern and medieval languages. He is fluent in French and Russian and speaks some Dutch and some Polish.

== Career ==
Coomarasamy has worked primarily for the BBC:

- 1991. Production assistant in the BBC Moscow bureau, after which he freelanced in Moscow as a reporter-producer
- Producer for the BBC World in London
- December 1994. Returned to Moscow as the bureau's bi-media producer, covering major stories such as the war in Chechnya
- November 1997. In Warsaw as the BBC correspondent covering events in Poland, the Baltics and Ukraine
- From 1999 to 2003. The BBC's Paris reporter, covering for both radio and television
- From February 2005. Correspondent in Washington, D.C., for North America
- 2009. Presented Europe Today for the BBC World Service
- 2010. Joined the presentation team for Newshour on the BBC World Service

== Personal life ==
Coomarasamy is married to Nanette van der Laan. They have two children: Maya and Finn.
