= Chatham House =

British think tank

Coordinates: 51.5077°N 0.1360°W

- The Royal Institute of International Affairs

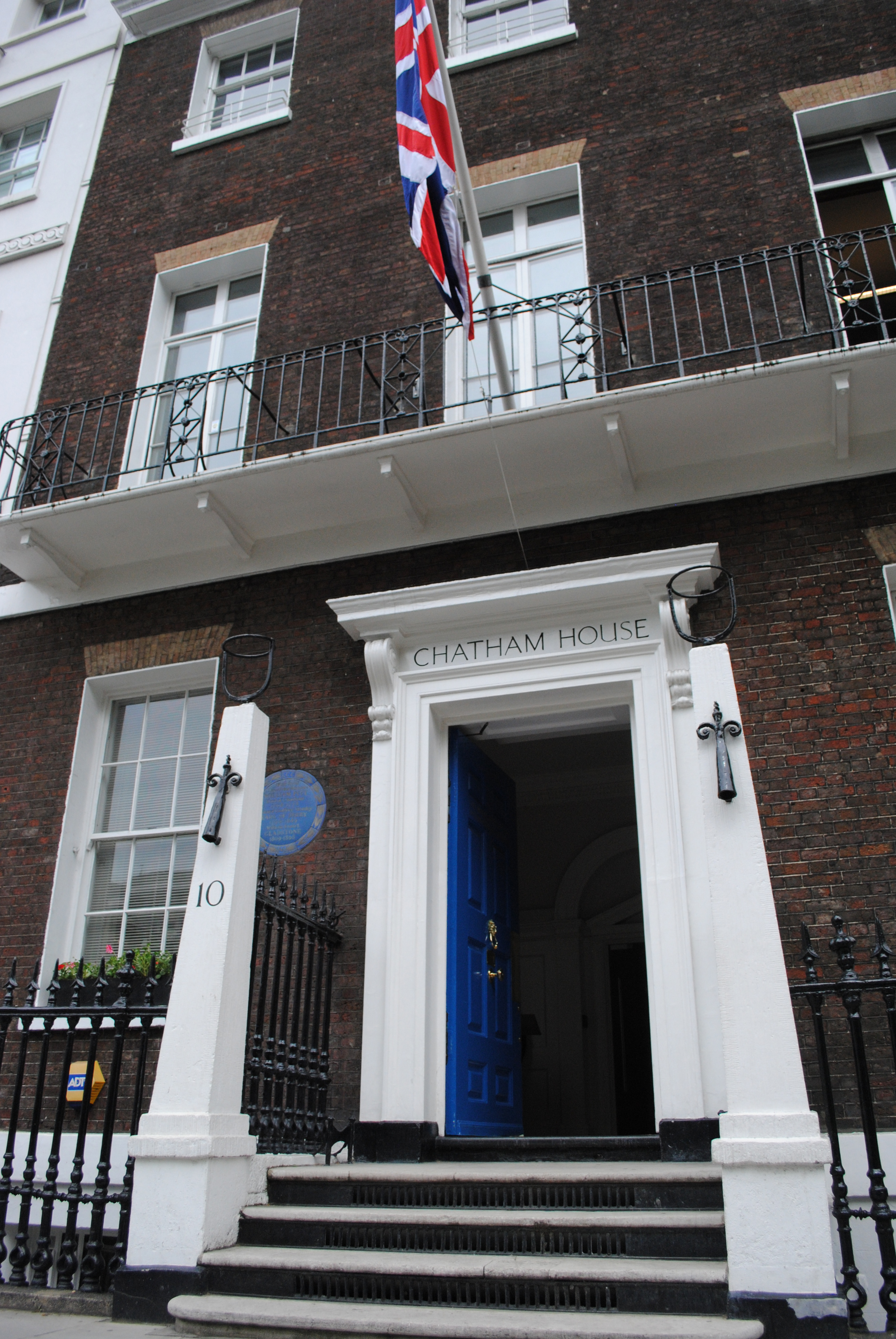
- Entrance to Chatham House in 2012
- Established: 1920; 106 years ago
- Headquarters: 10 St James's Square; London, England
- Members: 6,000 (approx.)
- Website: chathamhouse.org
- Formerly called: The British Institute of International Affairs

The Royal Institute of International Affairs, also known as Chatham House, is a British think tank based in London, England. Its stated mission is "to help governments and societies build a sustainably secure, prosperous, and just world." It has been praised for providing a safe space for speakers and encouraging openness. Its current presidents are Theresa May, Valerie Amos, Baroness Amos and Helen Clark.

The Royal Institute of International Affairs has its headquarters in central London at 10 St James's Square, which is known as Chatham House. It is a Grade I listed 18th-century building that was designed in part by Henry Flitcroft and was occupied by three British prime ministers, including William Pitt, 1st Earl of Chatham, whose name became associated with the house. Canadian philanthropists Lieutenant-Colonel Reuben Wells Leonard and Kate Rowlands Leonard purchased the property in 1923 and then donated the building to the fledgling institute as its headquarters. As a result, the Chatham House name is used as a metonym for the institute as a whole.

Chatham House accepts individual members, as well as members from corporations, academic institutions, embassies, and NGOs. The institute has also faced scrutiny over perceived elitism, limited funding transparency, alignment with interventionist foreign policy positions, and its early links to British imperialism. It is the originator of the Chatham House Rule.

== Chatham House Rule ==
Chatham House is the origin of the non-attribution rule known as the Chatham House Rule, which provides that a participant in a meeting may discuss the content of this meeting in the outside world, but may not discuss who attended nor identify what a specific individual said. The Chatham House Rule evolved to facilitate frank and honest discussion on controversial or unpopular issues by speakers who may not have otherwise had the appropriate forum to speak freely. Most meetings at Chatham House are held on the record rather than under the Chatham House Rule.

== Research structure ==
Chatham House is structured around thirteen research programmes, comprising six thematic programmes and seven regional programmes.

Thematic programmes:

- Environment and Society
- Global Economy and Finance
- Global Health
- International Law
- International Security
- Digital Society

The latter four programmes are grouped together under the umbrella of the Global Governance and Security Centre, which looks at evolving challenges to the international norms, values and institutions of the current global order.

The Environment and Society Centre also houses the Sustainability Accelerator, an initiative that aims to combine the best of evidence-based policymaking with the experimental approach of the entrepreneurship community to reach sustainability solutions.

Regional programmes:

- Africa
- Asia-Pacific
- Europe
- Middle East and North Africa
- Russia and Eurasia
- US and the Americas
- UK in the World

Chatham House regularly hosts speakers from the UK and international policy and business communities.

Chatham House has produced the policy journal International Affairs since 1922, and the Journal of Cyber Policy since 2016. It has also published a quarterly global affairs magazine, The World Today, since 1945.

== Members ==
The currently around 6,000 members pay an annual membership fee of between £170 and £365, depending on their status. Corporations and companies can choose between a partnership, a major corporate membership, and a standard corporate partnership. There are also separate memberships for academic institutions and NGOs.

Partners of Chatham House include BP, ExxonMobil, Equinor and Chevron, as well as Apple, Shell, McKinsey & Company, HSBC, Reliance Industries and Novartis. Other partners include NGOs like the Open Society Foundations, the Robert Bosch Foundation, the Carnegie Corporation of New York and Stavros Niarchos Foundation, as well as the UK Ministry of Defence and the Foreign, Commonwealth and Development Office.

Major corporate members include mining giants Rio Tinto Group, BHP Billiton, one of the world's largest banks Citigroup, the defense contractors BAE Systems and Northrop Grumman, the British Army, the law firm Linklaters, the world's largest accounting and consulting firms KPMG, Boston Consulting Group, Deloitte, and PricewaterhouseCoopers, media groups BBC, The Economist and Bloomberg, the City of London, the Gates Foundation, S&P Global, TikTok, Trafigura, Pfizer, Nvidia and Vodafone.

The following companies and organisations are among others represented as corporate members: Anglo American plc, Bank of England, Bank of Japan, Barclays, Bayer, Cisco, De Beers, EY, GSK, The Guardian, Hakluyt & Company, International Institute for Strategic Studies, Prudential plc, Rolls-Royce plc, Standard Chartered, Temasek Holdings, UBS, Vitol, Walmart and Wellcome Trust. NGO members include the Aga Khan Foundation, Carbon Trust, The Royal Society, Islamic Relief and Save the Children UK. Academic members include King's College London and the London School of Economics. In addition, over 60 embassies from around the world, are also members of Chatham House.

== History ==
=== Origins ===
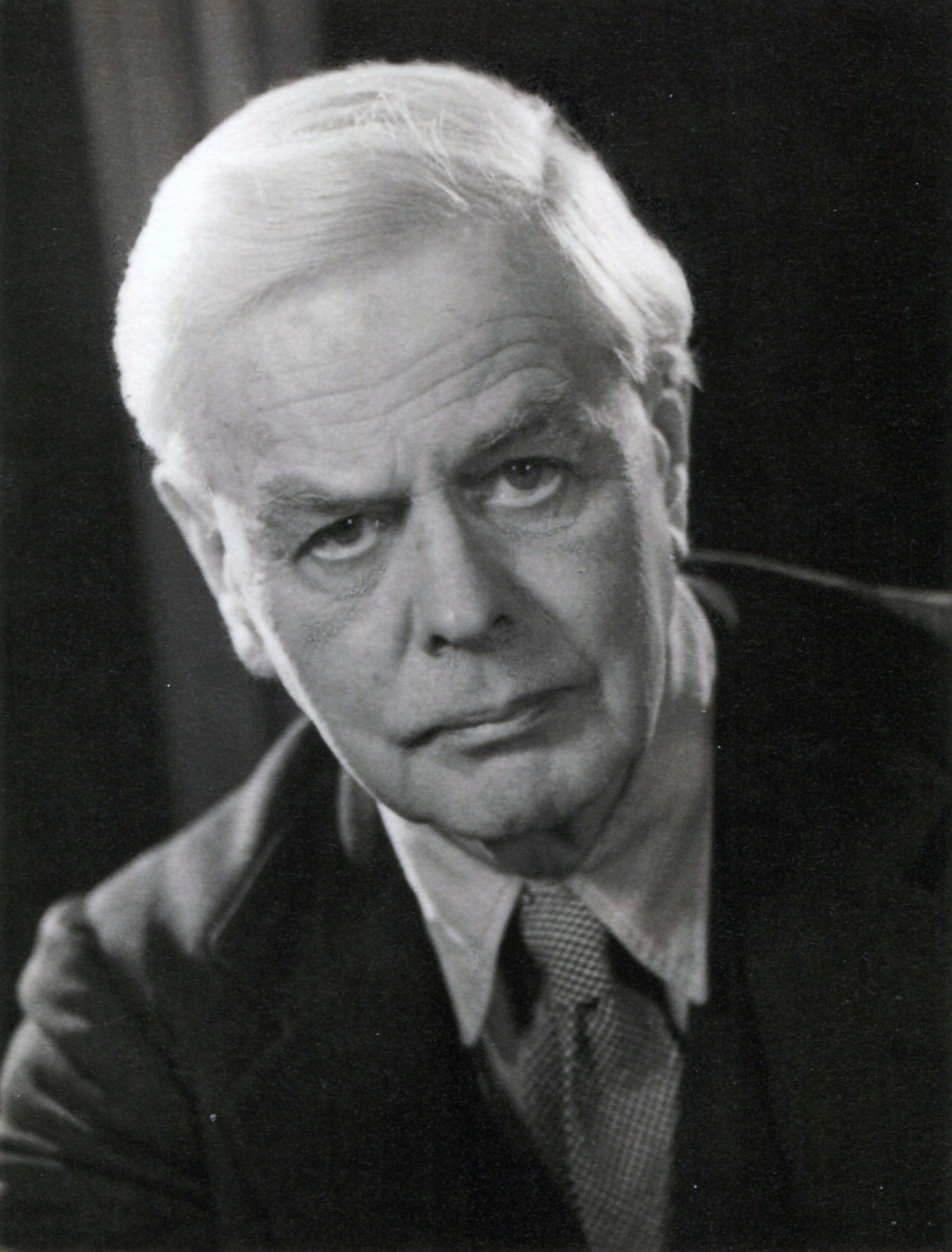
Lionel Curtis was instrumental in the founding of Chatham House.

The Royal Institute of International Affairs originated in a meeting, convened by Lionel Curtis, of the American and British delegates to the Paris Peace Conference on 30 May 1919. Curtis had long been an advocate for the scientific study of international affairs and, following the beneficial exchange of information after the peace conference, argued that the method of expert analysis and debate should be continued when the delegates returned home in the form of international institute. The British and American delegates formed separate institutes, with the Americans developing the Council on Foreign Relations in New York City.

The British Institute of International Affairs, as it was then known, held its inaugural meeting, chaired by Robert Cecil, on 5 July 1920. In this, former Foreign Secretary Edward Grey moved the resolution calling the institute into existence: "That an Institute be constituted for the study of International Questions, to be called the British Institute of International Affairs." These two, along with Arthur J. Balfour and John R. Clynes, became the first Presidents of the institute, with Lionel Curtis and G. M. Gathorne–Hardy appointed joint Honorary Secretaries.

By 1922, as the institute's membership grew, there was a need for a larger and more practical space and the Institute acquired, through the gift of Canadian Colonel R. W. Leonard, Chatham House, Number 10 St. James's Square, where the institute is still housed.

=== Inter-war years ===
Following its inception, the Institute quickly focused upon Edward Grey's resolution, with the 1920s proving an active decade at Chatham House. The journal International Affairs was launched in January 1922, allowing for the international circulation of the various reports and discussions which took place within the institute.

After being appointed as Director of Studies, Professor Arnold Toynbee produced the institute's annual Survey of International Affairs until his retirement in 1955. While providing a detailed annual overview of international relations, the survey's primary role was 'to record current international history'. The survey continued until 1963 and was well received throughout the Institution, coming to be known as 'the characteristic external expression of Chatham House research: a pioneer in method and a model for scholarship.'

In 1926, 14 members of Chatham House represented the United Kingdom at the first conference of the Institute of Pacific Relations, a forum dedicated to the discussion of problems and relations between Pacific nations. The IPR served as a platform for the institute to develop a political and commercial awareness of the region, with special focus being placed upon China's economic development and international relations.

In the same year the Institute received its royal charter, thereupon being known as the Royal Institute of International Affairs. The Charter set out the aims and objectives of the institute, which were to "advance the sciences of international politics... promote the study and investigation of international questions by means of lectures and discussion... promote the exchange of information, knowledge and thought on international affairs."

=== Further expansion ===
The year 1929 marked the next stage in the institute's development, with the appointment of a full-time chief executive or director. Ivison Macadam was appointed to the position (Secretary and then Director-General), in which he oversaw the institute's rapid expansion with its growing research, organisational and financial needs, a role he occupied until 1955.

Macadam was able to secure funding to expand the physical plant of the Institute by acquiring the freeholds of 6 Duke of York Street, then called York Street (largely through the generosity of Waldorf Astor, John Power, and others) and later 9 St James's Square, then the Portland Club, in 1943 (through a donation to cover its purchase by Henry Price), and connect these adjoining properties to the original freehold property of Chatham House at 10 St James Square (with the cost of these connections covered by Astor's sons, William, David, and John). Power also donated his leasehold property in Chesham Place to the Institute in 1938. These additional properties provided much needed additional space for the institute's activities.

1929 also saw the inception of the institute's special study group on the international gold problem. The group, which included leading economists such as John Maynard Keynes, conducted a three-year study into the developing economic issues which the post-war international monetary settlement created. The group's research anticipated Britain's decision to abandon the gold standard two years later.

Around this time Chatham House became known as the place for leading statesmen and actors in world affairs to visit when in London; notably, Mahatma Gandhi visited the institute on 20 October 1931, in which he delivered a talk on "The Future of India". The talk was attended by 750 members, making it the institute's largest meeting up to that point.

In 1933 Norman Angell, whilst working within the institute's Council, was awarded the Nobel Peace Prize for his book The Great Illusion, making him the first and only Laureate to be awarded the prize for publishing a book.

Chatham House held the first Commonwealth Relations Conference in Toronto, Ontario, Canada in 1933. Held roughly every five years, the conference provided a forum for leading politicians, lawyers, academics and others to discuss the implications of recent Imperial Conferences. With various dominion nations seeking to follow individual foreign policy aims, Major-General Sir Neill Malcolm, the chairman of the Council of the institute, emphasised the need for "essential agreement in matters of foreign policy between the various Governments," with the Commonwealth Relations Conference being the vehicle upon which this cooperation would be achieved and maintained.

=== War years, 1939–1945 ===
==== WWII Foreign Press and Research Service ====
At the outbreak of the Second World War the institute was decentralised for security reasons, with many of the staff moving to Balliol College, Oxford from Chatham House's main buildings in St James's Square. There, the Foreign Press and Research Service of the Institute worked closely with the Foreign Office to provide intelligence for and to work closely with the Foreign Office dedicating their research to the war effort under the Chairmanship of Waldorf Astor,

The formal remit of Chatham House for the FPRS at Balliol was:
1. To review the press overseas.
2. To “produce at the request of the Foreign Office, and the Service and other Departments, memoranda giving the historical and political background on any given situation on which information is desired”.
3. “To provide information on special points desired" (in regards to each country). It provided various reports on foreign press, historical and political background of the enemy and various other topics.

Many eminent historians served on the FPRS under Arnold J. Toynbee as its director and with Lionel Curtis (represented the Chairman) at Oxford until 1941 when Ivison Macadam took over from him. There were four deputy directors, Alfred Zimmern, George N. Clark, Herbert J. Patton and Charles K. Webster, and a number of experts in nineteen national divisions.

It was moved to the Foreign Office 1943–46.

==== Post-war reconstruction ====
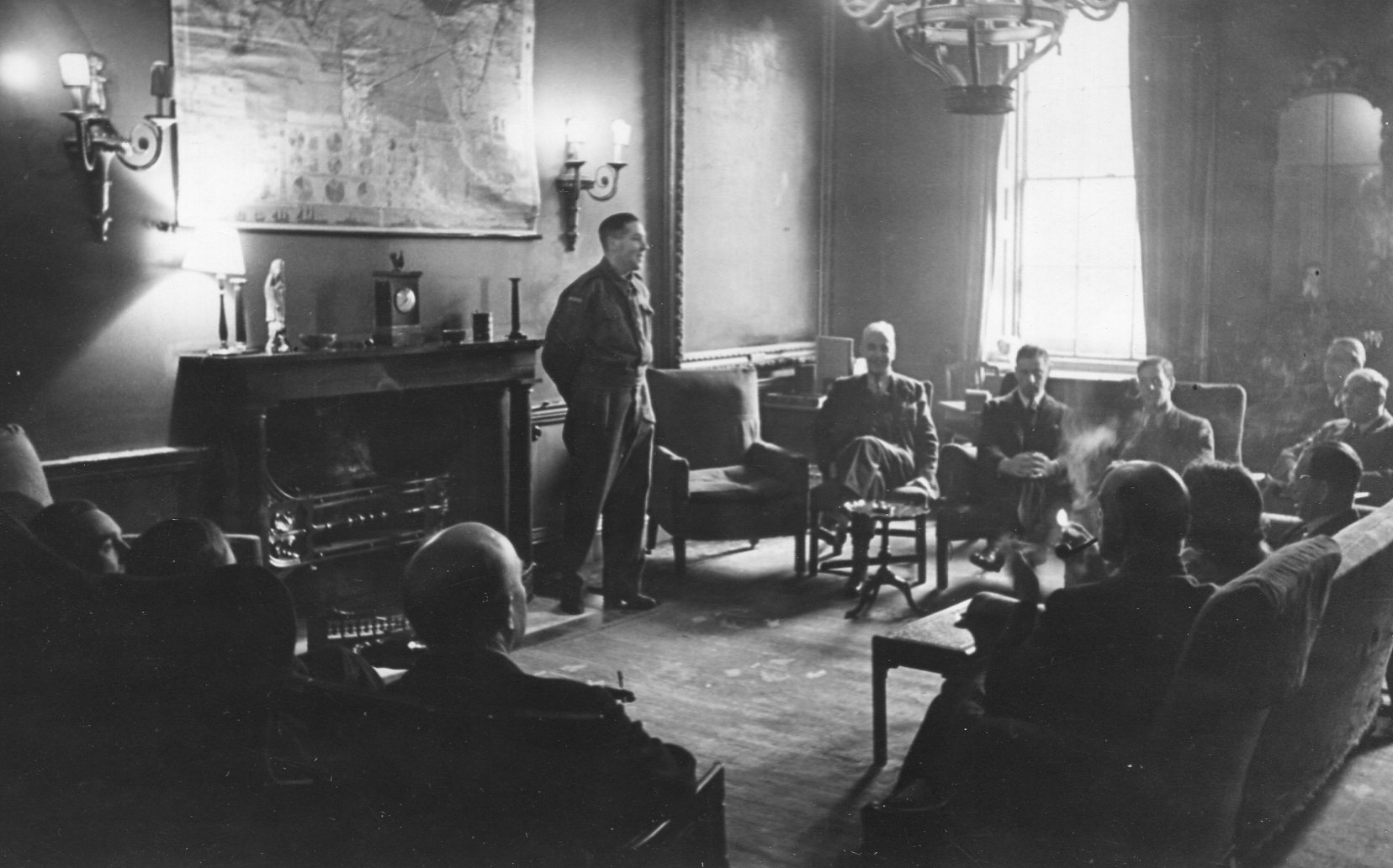
Committee of Post-War Reconstruction meeting in the institute's Common Room, 1943

The institute also provided many additional services to scholars and the armed forces at its St. James's Square home. The Institute reopened formally on 28 October 1943; the session was addressed by the American commanding general of U.S. Army logistics forces in the ETO, then-Maj. Gen. John C. H. Lee, who spent a substantial part of his time working with the Theater G-5 officer (Civil-Military Affairs), MG Ray W. Barker. Research facilities were opened to refugee and allied academics, whilst arrangements were made for both the National Institute of Economic and Social Research and the Polish Research Centre to relocate to the Institute following the bombing of their premises. In addition, allied officers undertook courses in international affairs at the Institute in an attempt to develop their international and political awareness as well as post-war reconstruction planning.

=== Post-war 20th century ===
Chatham House had been researching potential post-war issues as early as 1939 through the Committee on Reconstruction. Whilst a number of staff returned to the Institute at the end of the war, a proportion of members found themselves joining a range of international organisations, including the United Nations and the International Monetary Fund. Combining this with the institute's early support of the League of Nations and impact of the gold study on the Bretton Woods system, Chatham House found itself to be a leading actor in international political and economic redevelopment.

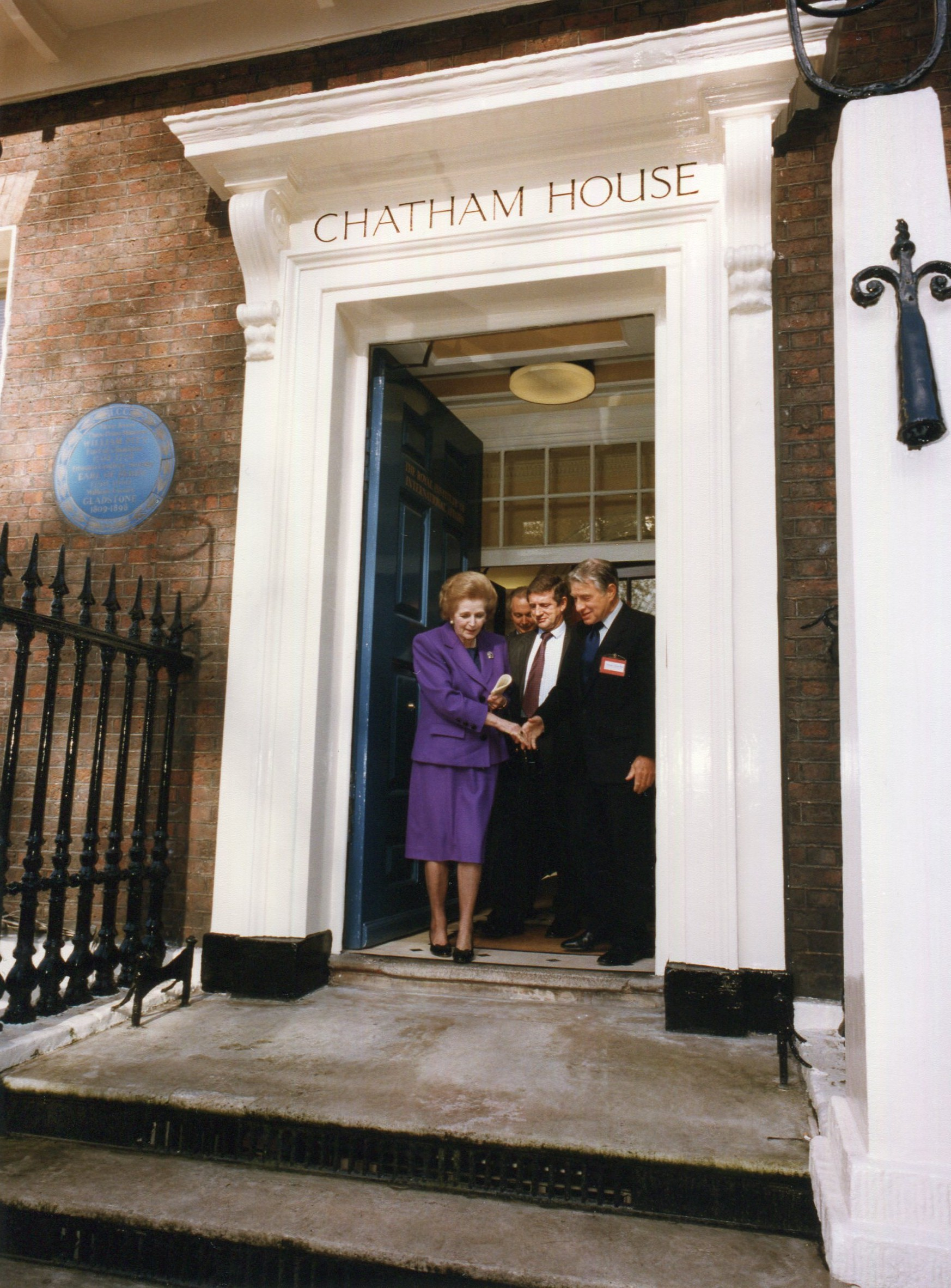
Margaret Thatcher leaving Chatham House after attending the 'Inside Saudi Arabia: Society, Economy and Defence' conference, October 1993.

In reaction to the changing post-war world, Chatham House embarked on a number of studies relating to Britain and the Commonwealth's new political stature, in light of growing calls for decolonisation and the development of the Cold War. A board of studies in race relations was created in 1953, allowing for the close examination of changing attitudes and calls for racial equality throughout the world. The group broke off into an independent charity in 1958, forming the Institute of Race Relations.

Following the Cuban Missile Crisis and Brazilian coup d'état, the institute developed a growing focus on the Latin American region. Che Guevara, then Cuba's Minister of Industry, wrote an analysis of 'The Cuban Economy: Its Past and Present Importance' in 1964 for International Affairs.

Chatham House played a more direct role in the international affairs of the Cold War through the October 1975 Anglo-Soviet round-table, the first in a series of meetings between Chatham House and the Institute of World Economy and International Relations in Moscow. As an early example of two-track diplomacy, the meeting sought to develop closer communication and improved relations between Britain and the Soviet Union.

At the start of the 1980s, the Council moved to expand the institute's research capabilities in two key emerging areas. The first modern programmes to be created under this initiative were the Energy and Research Programme and the International Economics Programme, formed in 1980–1981.

In addition to reshaping its research practices, the institute also sought to strengthen its international network, notably amongst economically prosperous nations. For example, Chatham House's Far East programme, created with the intention of improving Anglo-Japanese relations in the long and short term, was bolstered by the support of the Japan 2000 group in 1984.

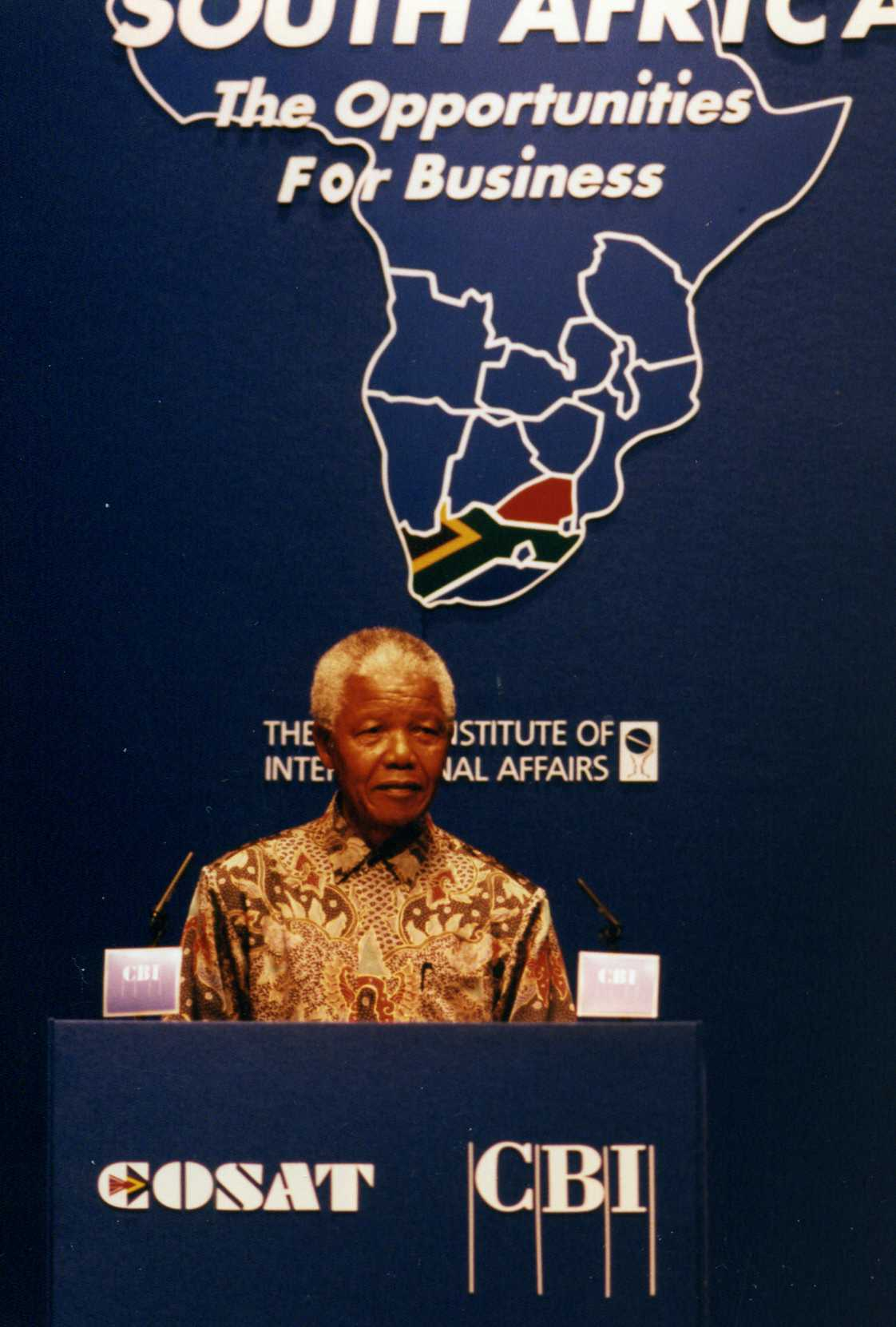
Nelson Mandela delivering a speech at the Chatham House conference 'South Africa: The Opportunities for Business', 10 July 1996.

=== 21st century ===
In 1998, Chatham House launched the Angola Forum (also known as the British-Angola Forum, BAF), expanding its research beyond Anglophone Africa, with BP as the founding sponsor. Angola's oil reserves, combined with growing international ambition, facilitated Angola's quick ascent as an influential African nation. Chatham House said the Angola Forum was intended to create an international platform for "forward looking, policy focused and influential debate and research". It served as the basis for launching the Institute's wider Africa Programme in 2002, beginning the modern structure of area studies programmes. Alex Vines was appointed as the head of the Africa Programme and convenor of the BAF (alongside Manuel Paulo) in 2002.

In 2005, Security, Terrorism and the UK was published.

The Chatham House Prize was launched in 2005, recognising heads of state and organisations that made a significant contribution to international relations during the previous year. Queen Elizabeth II presented the debut award to Ukrainian President Victor Yushchenko.

In January 2013, the Institute announced its Academy for Leadership in International Affairs, offering potential and established world leaders a 12-month fellowship at the institution with the aim of providing "a unique programme of activities and training to develop a new generation of leaders in international affairs." In November 2014, The Queen formally launched the academy under the title of the "Queen Elizabeth II Academy for Leadership in International Affairs."

The Institute celebrated its centenary in 2020 with a series of events and initiatives such as the SNF CoLab, the Common Futures Conversations project, and the introduction of a panel of young advisers, plus three Chatham House Centenary Awards for Sir David Attenborough, Melina Abdullah and Greta Thunberg.

In April 2022, Russia designated Chatham House as an "undesirable organisation".

Christopher Sabatini, a senior fellow at Chatham House, leads a project promoting opposition to the Venezuelan government of Nicolás Maduro. After Juan Guaidó failed to replace Maduro as president, Sabatini said "The current strategy on Venezuela hasn't worked, so we have to try something else. The Guaidó government was a failure but it did provide a rallying point which no longer exists".

==== Reports since 2015 ====
In 2015, several reports were published by Chatham House, including Nigeria's Booming Borders: The Drivers and Consequences of Unrecorded Trade, which urges formalising trade and driving more sustainable and less volatile growth; Changing Climate, Changing Diets: Pathways to Lower Meat Consumption examines a reduction in global meat consumption as critical to keeping global warming below the "danger level" of two degrees Celsius; Heat, Light and Power for Refugees: Saving Lives, Reducing Costs examines the reasons why energy provision to displaced people undermines the fundamental humanitarian aims of assistance; and Towards a New Global Business Model for Antibiotics: Delinking Revenues from Sales argued for revenues for pharmaceutical companies to be de-linked from sales of antibiotics to avoid their over-use and avert a public health crisis.

In 2016, Chatham House published Elite Perceptions of the United States in Latin America and the Post-Soviet States, examining how elites in Latin America and the former Soviet Union view the United States, and providing recommendations on how the US could adjust its policies based on these perceptions.

2017 reports included The Struggle for Ukraine, an exploration of, four years after its Euromaidan revolution, Ukraine's fight for survival as an independent and viable state; Chokepoints and Vulnerabilities in Global Food Trade advocates for policymakers to take immediate action to mitigate the risk of severe disruption at certain ports, maritime straits, and inland transport routes, which could have devastating knock-on effects for global food security; Collective Action on Corruption in Nigeria: A Social Norms Approach to Connecting Society and Institutions examines how anti-corruption efforts could be made significantly more effective through new ways of understanding why people engage in the practice; and America's International Role Under Donald Trump explores the impact of US President Donald Trump's personality and style—brash, unpredictable, contradictory and thin-skinned—on his engagement in foreign affairs.

Major reports in 2018 included Transatlantic Relations: Converging or Diverging? which argues that the longer-term fundamentals of the transatlantic relationship remain strong, Making Concrete Change: Innovation in Low-carbon Cement and Concrete exploring why significant changes in how cement and concrete are produced and used are urgently needed to achieve deep cuts in emissions in line with the Paris Agreement on climate change, and Artificial Intelligence and International Affairs arguing the rise of AI must be better managed in the near term in order to mitigate longer term risks and to ensure that AI does not reinforce existing inequalities.

2019 saw three major reports produced. The UK and Japan makes the case that a stronger relationship could advance each country's ability to address shared global concerns. Conflict Economies in the Middle East and North Africa examines the common economic factors that continue to drive conflict in Iraq, Libya, Syria and Yemen. And Kazakhstan: Tested by Transition examines if the country can pursue modernisation and reform, and break from its authoritarian past.

In 2020 and 2021, there were reports on The Business Case for Investment in Nutrition claiming to be the first of its kind to reveal the hidden costs of malnutrition for business, and the extent to which these costs are recognised and addressed by multinational companies and Myths and misconceptions in the debate on Russia which aims to deconstruct sixteen of the most prevalent myths and misconceptions that shape contemporary Western thinking on Russia.

== Officers ==
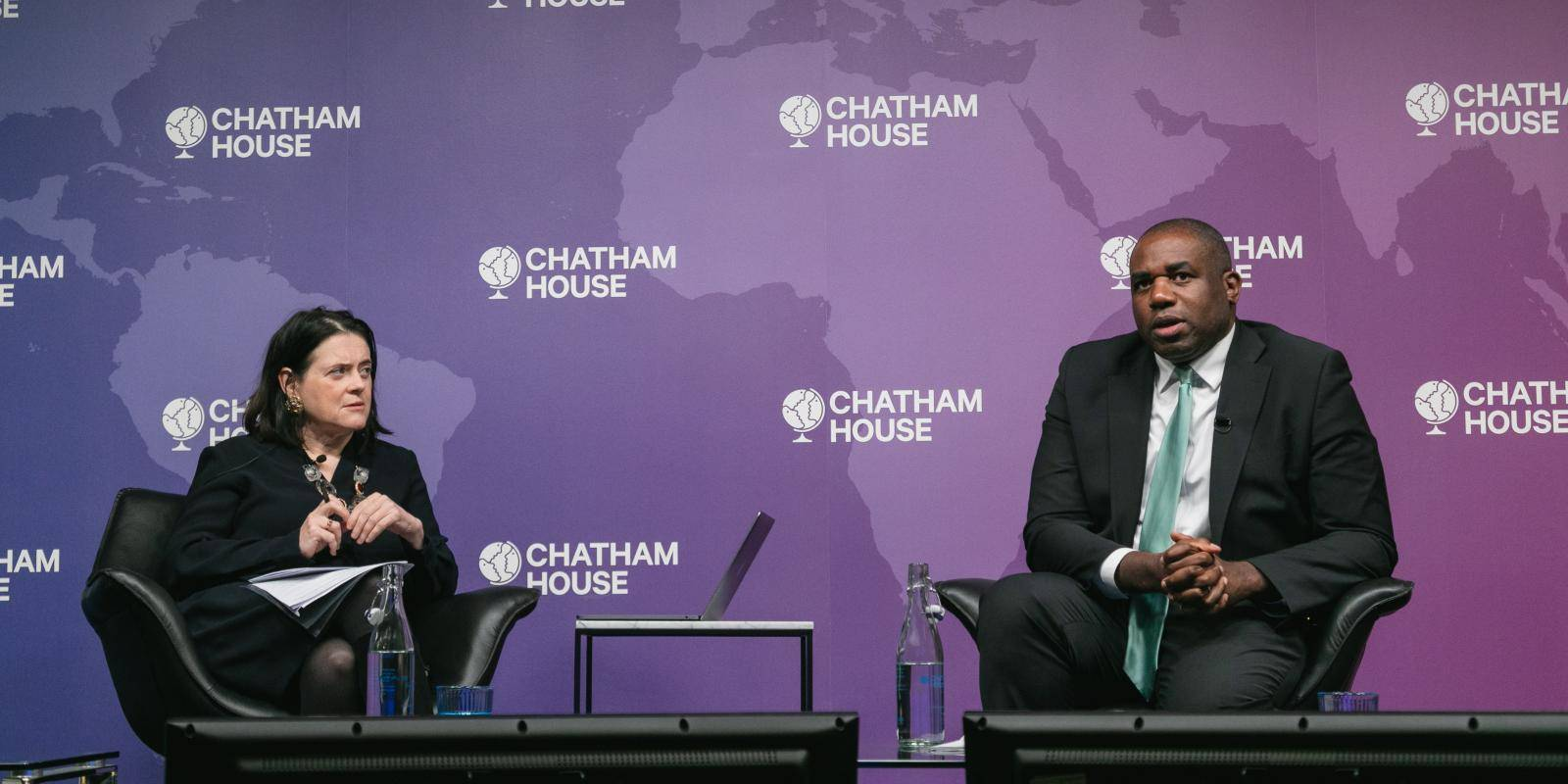
Bronwen Maddox meeting with UK Foreign Secretary David Lammy

As of 2025, the chairman of the Council of Chatham House is Sir Simon Fraser, and its director and CEO is Bronwen Maddox. Maddox took over in 2022 from Sir Robin Niblett, who had been director of Chatham House for 15 years.

Chatham House has three presidents: The Rt Hon Theresa May, former prime minister of the United Kingdom, Valerie Amos, Baroness Amos, and Helen Clark, former prime minister of New Zealand.

Current personnel are listed on the Chatham House website.

== Funding ==
Chatham House publishes its funding sources on its website. Past donors have included the Open Society Foundation, MAVA Foundation (closed 2022); the UK Foreign, Commonwealth and Development Office; and The Robert Bosch Stiftung GmbH.

In 2024, the funding transparency website Who Funds You? gave the Chatham a B grade (rating goes from A to E, with A being the most transparent).

== Chatham House Prize ==
The Chatham House Prize is an annual award presented to "the person, persons, or organization deemed by members of Chatham House to have made the most significant contribution to the improvement of international relations in the previous year".

=== List of winners ===
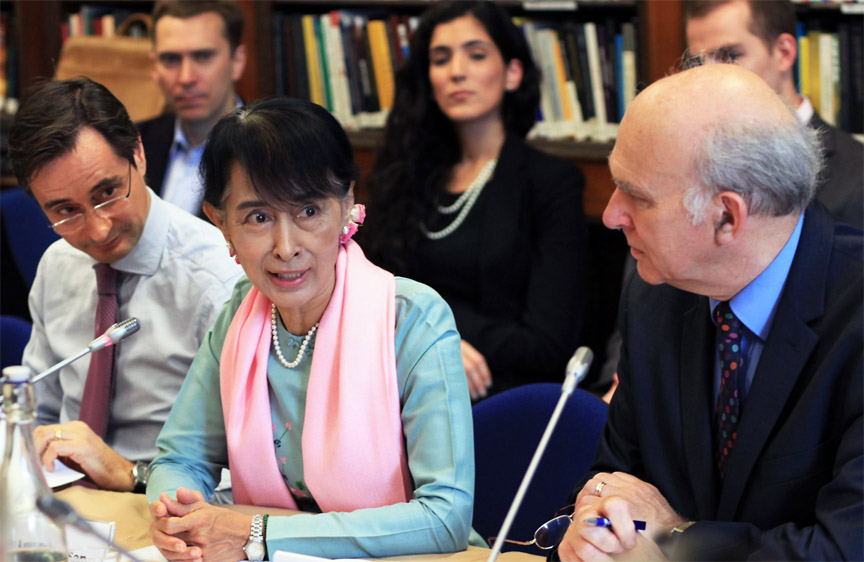
Chatham House's former Director Robin Niblett (left) with Myanmar opposition leader Aung San Suu Kyi

Year	Name	Country
2005	President Viktor Yushchenko	Ukraine
2006	President Joaquim Chissano	Mozambique
2007	Sheikha Mozah Al Missned	Qatar
2008	President John Kufuor	Ghana
2009	President Lula da Silva	Brazil
2010	President Abdullah Gül	Turkey
2011	Burmese opposition leader Aung San Suu Kyi	Myanmar
2012	President Moncef Marzouki and Rached Ghannouchi	Tunisia
2013	Secretary of State Hillary Clinton	United States
2014	Co-founder of the Bill and Melinda Gates foundation Melinda French Gates	United States
2015	Médecins Sans Frontières	Switzerland
2016	Minister of Foreign Affairs Mohammad Javad Zarif	Iran
2016	Secretary of State John Kerry	United States
2017	President Juan Manuel Santos	Colombia
2018	Committee to Protect Journalists	United States
2019	Sir David Attenborough and Julian Hector	United Kingdom
2020	Malawi Constitutional Court Justices Healey Potani, Ivy Kamanga, Redson Kapindu, Dingiswayo Madise and Michael Tembo	Malawi
2023	President Volodymyr Zelenskyy	Ukraine
2024	Prime Minister Donald Tusk	Poland
2025	Sudan's Emergency Response Rooms	Sudan
2026	The women of Afghanistan	Afghanistan

== Distinctions ==
In November 2016, Chatham House was named Prospect magazine's Think-Tank of the Year, as well as the winner in the UK categories for International Affairs and Energy and Environment.

In the University of Pennsylvania's rankings for 2017, Chatham House was ranked the think tank of the year, and the second-most influential in the world after the Brookings Institution, and the world's most influential non-U.S. think tank.

== Reactions ==
Chatham House has been criticized for its perceived elitism, lacking transparency in funding, and alignment with Western interventionism. Scholars have noted that the think tank is operated by political, academic, and corporate elites. The Financial Times has questioned the organization's limited disclosure of funding sources, particularly in comparison to European counterparts. In one instance, the Bureau of Investigative Journalism revealed that a report published by Chatham House was authored by a lobbyist with undisclosed financial interests in the subject matter, highlighting issues with Chatham House's editorial independence. Critics have also argued that the institution has historically supported interventionist foreign policy positions, especially in relation to the Iraq War and NATO expansion.

== See also ==
- Australian Institute of International Affairs
- Canadian International Council
- German Council on Foreign Relations
- International Affairs
- List of think tanks in the United Kingdom
- Netherlands Institute of International Relations Clingendael
- Pakistan Institute of International Affairs
- Singapore Institute of International Affairs
- The World Today

== Bibliography ==
- Bosco, A., and C. Navari, eds. Chatham House and British Foreign Policy, 1919–1945: The Royal Institute of International Affairs During the Interwar Period (London, 1994).
- Carrington, Charles (2004). Chatham House: Its History and Inhabitants. Revised and updated by Mary Bone. Chatham House. ISBN 1-86203-154-1.
- Morgan, R. "'To Advance the Sciences of International Politics...': Chatham House’s Early Research", International Affairs, 55:2 (1979), 240–251.
- Parmar, I. "Anglo-American Elites in the Interwar Years: Idealism and Power in Chatham House and the Council on Foreign Relations", International Relations 16:53 (2002), 53–75.
- Perry, Jamie Kenneth John. "Chatham House, The United Nations Association and the politics of foreign policy, c. 1945–1975" (PhD Diss. University of Birmingham, 2015) online.
- Thorne, Christopher. "Chatham House, Whitehall, and Far Eastern Issues: 1941–1945", International Affairs, 54:1 (1978), 1–29.
- Williams, Paul. "A Commonwealth of knowledge: Empire, intellectuals and the Chatham House Project, 1919–1939." International Relations 17.1 (2003): 35–58.
