= Fergus Nicoll =

British journalist and author

Fergus Nicoll is a British author and former BBC World Service radio presenter.

== Early life ==
Nicoll was educated at Ampleforth College, Christ Church, Oxford (BA Oriental Studies) and Reading University, where he graduated PhD with a thesis entitled 'Gladstone, Gordon and Sudan, 1883-5'.

== Career ==
After working as a teacher in northern Sudan, he began his career with the BBC in 1988 with the African Service. He worked in the BBC's Cairo Bureau from 1992-3 and spent three years (1996-9) as a World Affairs Correspondent, filing for the World Service and BBC World TV. In 1999-2000, he was Press Officer for Olara Otunnu, Special Representative of the UN Secretary General for Children and Armed Conflict, in New York. From 2001-12, he was a freelance presenter on the BBC World Service radio programme The World Today. From April–June 2012, Dr Nicoll was the 2013 Sir William Luce Fellow at Durham University, where he carried out research on the Da'irat al-Mahdi in Sudan. From August 2012-July 2013 he was Public Relations and Publications Manager at the Rift Valley Institute. From September 2013 to August 2014 he worked in Doha, Qatar, as a Programme Editor and Executive Producer for Al Jazeera English. From 2014 to May 2022 he was based in London as a presenter on the BBC World Service radio programmes Business Matters and World Business Report. Since April 2023, he has been a Research Associate in the Faculty of History at the University of Oxford.

== Writing ==
In 2004, Nicoll published a biography of the Mahdi of Sudan, The Sword of the Prophet: The Mahdi of Sudan and the Death of General Gordon. His second book, a biography of the Mughal Emperor Shah Jahan, was published by Haus Publishing in April 2009 as Shah Jahan: The Rise and Fall of the Mughal Emperor. Penguin-India (under the Viking imprint) published the same volume in paperback in September 2009. Returning to Sudan studies, Nicoll published An Index to the Complete Works of al-Imam al-Mahdi in June 2009. The Abd-al-Karim Mirghani Cultural Centre in Omdurman followed this with the publication of an Arabic translation of The Mahdi of Sudan in October 2009, under the title Seif al-Nabi: Mahdi al-Sudan. In September 2010, the Qasim Data Centre in Khartoum published Nicoll's Bibliography of the Mahdia. In April 2013, Pen & Sword published his PhD dissertation, a reappraisal of British policy in Sudan, as Gladstone, Gordon and the Sudan Wars, 1883-5: The Battle over Imperial Intervention in the Victorian Age. In July 2013, Durham University published his Luce Lecture as 'Da'irat al-Mahdi: Money, Faith and Politics in Sudan'. In late 2014, the Modestine Press in Milton Keynes published the first in a series of annotated editions of important primary sources relating to the Sudan wars: A Cool, Equable Judgement: The Sudan Journal of Lt.-Col. J. Donald Hamill-Stewart. After publishing 'Fatwa and Propaganda: Contemporary Muslim Responses to the Sudanese Mahdiyya' in Islamic Africa 7/2 (2016): 239-65, Nicoll resumed the Modestine Press series in 2017 with A Perfect Pandemonium: The Khartoum Journal of Major-General Charles Gordon and, in 2018, Fully Equal to the Occasion: Frank Power and the Siege of Khartoum. Since joining the 'Moving Stories' programme at Oxford, Nicoll has published A Bibliography of Late Ottoman Migration and the Making of a Global Middle Eastern Diaspora, 1854–1924, as well as peer-reviewed journal articles on the education of immigrant children from the eastern Mediterranean in the US and on the cartography of Mount Lebanon in the 19th century. He is currently working on a co-authored English edition of the Memoirs of Yūsuf Mikhāyīl, a Sudanese Coptic clerk and merchant.

== Awards ==
- Sony Award for "Best Breakfast Show" (1991)
- Sony Award for "Best News & Current Affairs Programme" (The World Today) (2009)
- Association for International Broadcasting Award for "Clearest live news coverage - radio" (2012) for coverage of South Sudan’s independence for BBC World Service
