= Roger Hearing =

British journalist

- Born: London, England
- Education: Hardye's School, Dorset; Downing College, Cambridge; City University London
- Occupation(s): Journalist, Broadcaster
- Notable credit(s): The World Today; Newshour

Roger Hearing is a journalist and former news presenter. He has worked as a presenter on the BBC World Service and at Bloomberg Radio.

== Early life ==
Hearing was born in London and brought up in west Dorset.

== Education ==
Hearing was educated at Hardye's School, a state grammar school (now a comprehensive school and renamed The Thomas Hardye School), in the market town of Dorchester in Dorset; he then attended Downing College, Cambridge and City University London.

== Life and career ==
Hearing's career in journalism began with the Birmingham Post; he joined the BBC World Service in 1987. During the course of his career with the World Service, he has reported from such countries as Zambia, Iraq, Burma, Azerbaijan, India and Peru. Since 1999, he has presented The World Today, Newshour and other World Service programmes. Hearing was also heard on BBC Radio 4 as a relief presenter on The World Tonight.

He has covered such important events as the civil wars in Angola and Mozambique, the build-up to the first Gulf War, the UN intervention in Somalia, and the genocide in Rwanda.

He left Bloomberg Radio in 2022, and returned to BBC World Service programming presenting regularly on Business Matters and World Business Report. He also presents a weekly current affairs podcast, The Why? Curve with Phil Dobbie.
