= Durdana Ansari =

British entrepreneur and public speaker (born 1960)

Durdana Ansari OBE
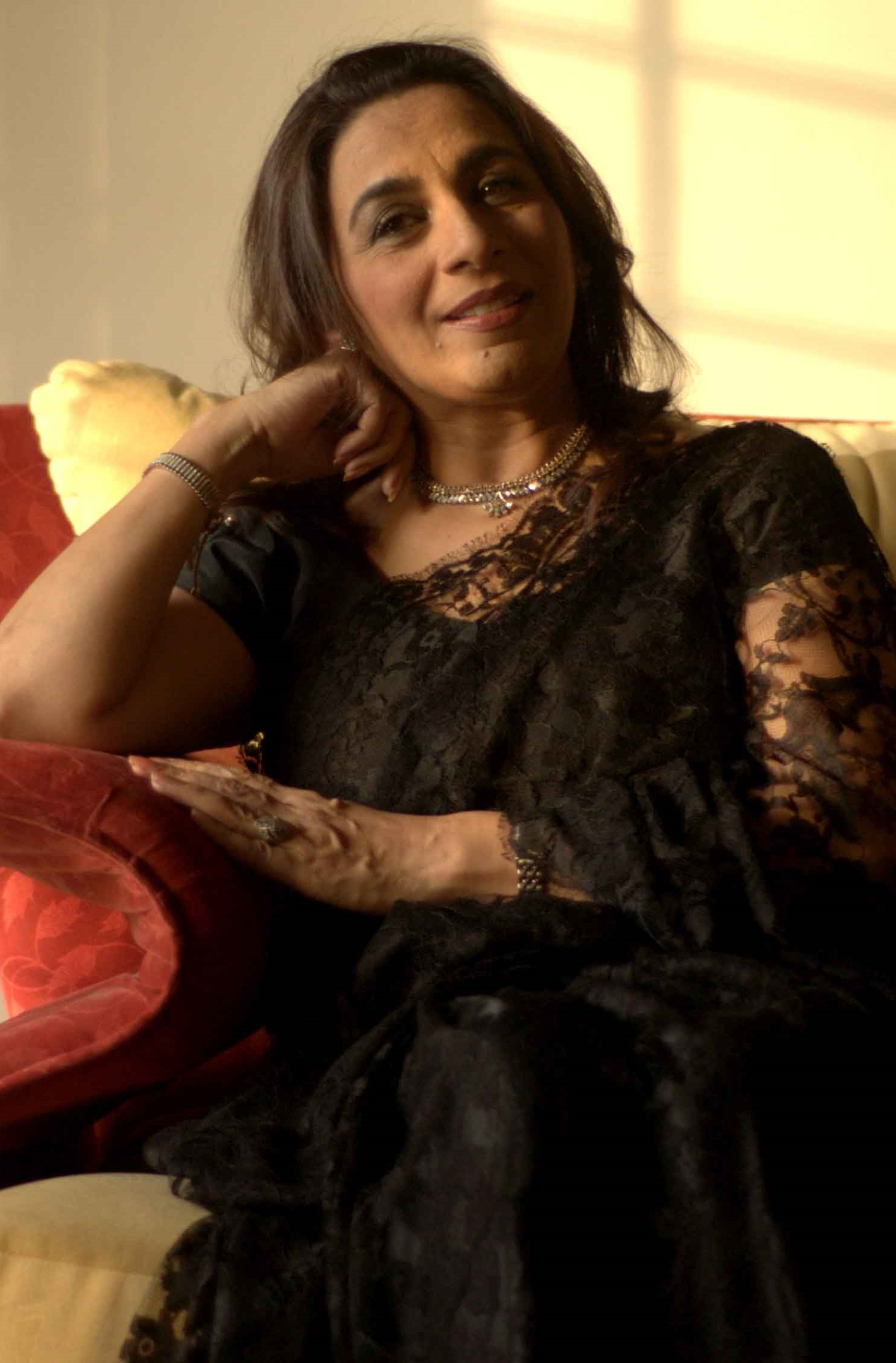
- Durdana Ansari
- Born: 1 March 1960 (age 66); Bahawalpur, Pakistan
- Education: Birkbeck, University of London
- Notable credits: BBC The World Today; BBC Outlook; BBC Meridian; BBC English Teaching Programme; BBC Urdu Service
- Children: 4
- Relatives: Asim Azhar (nephew)

Durdana Ansari OBE (born 1 March 1960) is a British entrepreneur, public speaker and activist for female empowerment. She is a former charity director, journalist, presenter and producer at the BBC World Service.

== Early life ==
Durdana Ansari was born in Bahawalpur, Pakistan, and grew up in Islamabad. She moved to London where she received her degree in media and journalism from Birkbeck University.

== Career ==
Ansari spent 22 years producing, directing, and interviewing for the BBC World Service. She received an Order of the British Empire in 2012 for creating an economic development program for Muslim women.

Her BBC programmes included The World Today (radio programme), Asian Network (Urdu), Outlook, Meridian, English Teaching Programme, and BBC Urdu Service.

Ansari was appointed as an Honorary Lieutenant Commander in the Royal Navy in 2018, she was promoted in 2019 to Honorary Commander, and in 2021 to Honorary Captain, becoming the first Muslim to reach the rank.

Ansari established The Pearl Foundation to teach functional spoken English, reading, writing and computer skills to British-Muslim women.

She also serves as a brand ambassador to Mirpur University of Science & Technology (MUST), the Swat Relief Initiative (SRI), and as a trustee for ‘Quest for Education’ (QFE).

Ansari has also participated in the Imran Khan Cancer Hospital, United Nations Development Programme (UNDP), Islamic Relief, and Helping Hands.

== Personal life ==
Durdana has four children, 2 boys and 2 girls. Her first child, Amina Art Ansari, is an artist with paintings of the British royal family hanging in Windsor Castle.

== Awards and honours ==
- 2012 Order of the British Empire (OBE)
- 2018 Honorary Commander Royal Navy
- 2021 Honorary Captain Royal Navy
