= Peter Bennett-Jones =

British film and television producer

Peter Bennett-Jones CBE is a British film and television producer and agent. He is perhaps best known as the former owner of TV production company Tiger Aspect Productions where he was the executive producer of a number of British shows including Mr. Bean and The Vicar of Dibley. He has also represented comedians such as Rowan Atkinson, Lenny Henry, Barry Humphries, Armando Iannucci and Eddie Izzard through his company PBJ Management. He is Chairman of Burning Bright Productions.

Bennett-Jones was educated at Heronwater School, nr Abergele, N Wales then at Winchester College, then read law at Magdalene College, Cambridge, where he was a member of the Cambridge Footlights and President of the university amateur dramatic club. After graduation, he toured America with Shakespeare productions and set up a theatre group Pola Jones with Andre Ptaszynski. He moved into film and TV, forming Talkback Productions and then setting up his own company, Tiger Television.

He was awarded the BAFTA Special Award and the RTS Lifetime Achievement Award in 2011 for his contribution to television, as well as his work as long-term chairman of Comic Relief and Sport Relief. He has served as Chair of Save the Children UK (2015–19) and as a Board member of the Royal National Theatre (2010–18), chairing its production Board; RADA; Rugby School, the Millennium Promise UK; the Oxford Playhouse and is a Trustee of the Liverpool Playhouse and Everyman. His brother Owen Bennett-Jones is a journalist who worked for the BBC World Service.

Bennett-Jones was appointed Commander of the Order of the British Empire (CBE) in the 2014 New Year Honours for services to the entertainment industry and to charity, particularly through Comic Relief. He was appointed a deputy lieutenant of Oxfordshire in 2020.
