= Robin Lustig =

British journalist and radio broadcaster (born 1948)

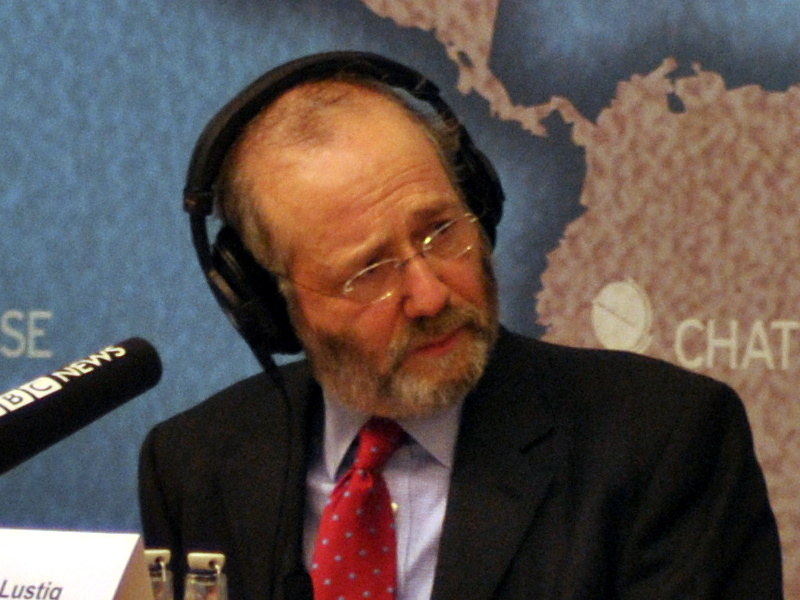
- Lustig in 2011
- Born: 30 August 1948 (age 78)
- Occupations: Journalist; presenter
- Notable credits: The World Tonight; Newshour
- Lustig's voice recorded July 2015

Robin Francis Lustig (born 30 August 1948, London) is a British journalist and radio broadcaster, who has presented programmes for the BBC World Service and BBC Radio 4.

== Family ==
Lustig was born in Stoke Newington, London, to Jewish refugees. Fritz, his father, who had fled from Germany in 1939, was in the British intelligence corps for whom he was a clandestine listener to German prisoners of war. His mother, Susan née Cohn, met his father at Wilton Park where they were both stationed. "She did clerical work", the elder Lustig told The Jewish Chronicle in 2012, adding "women did not listen in – only men did". Lustig has recounted that his maternal grandmother was refused asylum in the UK, and was deported to Lithuania by the Nazis in 1941, where she was murdered by pro-Nazi partisans.

== Career ==
After graduating in politics from the University of Sussex, Lustig became a foreign correspondent in Madrid for the London-based news agency Reuters. He later moved to Paris and Rome in this capacity. He then worked for the British Sunday newspaper The Observer for twelve years, where he was home affairs editor, Middle East correspondent and assistant editor.

He joined the BBC in 1989, presenting programmes such as The World Tonight, Newsstand, Stop Press, and File on 4 for Radio 4, and Newshour on the BBC World Service. On 31 August 1997, Lustig presented a special news programme covering the sudden death of Diana, Princess of Wales, just hours after the announcement was made. From its introduction in 1998 until 2006, he also presented the global phone-in programme Talking Point (later renamed Have Your Say), which was transmitted simultaneously on BBC World Service radio, BBC World TV and online. His guests on the programme included Nelson Mandela, Thabo Mbeki, Olusegun Obasanjo, Hugo Chávez and Tony Blair.

He later concentrated on The World Tonight and Newshour, although he still presented special programmes on major occasions. For the BBC World Service, he has presented every UK election night programme since 1997 as well as United States presidential election programmes in 2004 and 2008, and has reported on elections in many other countries including Iran, Israel, Japan, Russia and Zimbabwe. He has presented The World Tonight from more than 20 countries, including Afghanistan, China, Iran, Iraq, Japan, Kosovo and Mexico.

Lustig has written and presented four documentary series for the BBC World Service: Looking for Democracy in 2005, Generation Next in 2006, The Future of English in 2018, and The Future of Free Speech in 2020.

In October 2011, he starred as himself in Julian Simpson's improvised radio play A Time to Dance, broadcast as BBC Radio 4's Afternoon Play.

In September 2012, Lustig announced that he was to step down from his Radio 4 roles at the end of that year. On 13 December, Lustig presented his final The World Tonight, and on 18 December his final Newshour.

In January 2017, Lustig's memoir, Is Anything Happening? (ISBN 978-1785901034), describing his career of over 40 years in journalism, was published by Biteback.

His book And The Cello Came Too: A Story of Survival (ISBN 978-1919383408), centred on the experiences of his German-Jewish father during and after World War II, was published in June 2026.

Lustig appears regularly on Times Radio as a commentator.

== Awards ==
In 1992, Lustig was awarded a Gold Medal at the New York Radio Festival for a special edition of The World Tonight broadcast live from Moscow on the last day of the Soviet Union. In 1998, he won the Sony Silver Award for Talk/News Broadcaster of the Year. In 1999 he was described in The Times as "arguably the best news presenter anywhere in radio after John Humphrys". He was awarded Beard of the Year in 2012 presented by Beard Liberation Front.

In 2013, he received the Charles Wheeler award for outstanding contribution to broadcast journalism. The following year, he was named Comment Awards's independent blogger of the year for his blog Lustig's Letter. In 2015, he was awarded an honorary Doctor of Letters by the University of Sussex.
