= Hugh Prysor-Jones =

BBC journalist and presenter

Hugh Prysor-Jones (born 1949) was a journalist and a presenter of 24 Hours and Newshour on the BBC World Service.

He attended Bishops Court Prep School in Formby and later, Merton College at the University of Oxford.

Jones died in Somerset on 5 August 2015 at the age of 66.
