= Owen Bennett-Jones =

British journalist

- Education: London School of Economics; St Antony's College, Oxford; University of Hull
- Occupations: Journalist, presenter, writer
- Notable credit(s): Newshour; Newshour Extra
- Relatives: Peter Bennett-Jones (brother)

Owen Bennett-Jones is a freelance British journalist and a relief presenter of Newshour on the BBC World Service. As a former BBC correspondent having been based in several countries, he also regularly reports from around the world. He hosts "The future of..." on New Books Network podcast.

== Education ==
Bennett-Jones was educated at Canford School, in Dorset. He graduated from the London School of Economics (LSE). In 1983, he obtained his MPhil in politics from St Antony's College, Oxford. He also has a PhD from the University of Hull.

== Career ==
=== Journalist ===
Bennett-Jones has written for several British newspapers, including The Guardian, Financial Times and The Independent, as well as the London Review of Books. His recent London Review of Books articles have dealt with the MEK – a dissident Iranian militant group – and the assassination of Benazir Bhutto. He has also been a presenter of many programmes on the BBC World Service as well as a resident foreign correspondent in Bucharest, Geneva, Islamabad, Hanoi and Beirut.

In 2008, he won the Sony Radio Gold Award in the News Journalist of the Year.

In 2009, he was the Commonwealth journalist of the year.

=== Professor ===
In 2012, he was a Ferris Professor of Journalism at Princeton University. In 2014, he was a visiting professor at the University of Southern California in 2014.

=== Author ===
Bennett-Jones has lived in Pakistan as a BBC correspondent, and frequently travels to the country to cover it. His history of Pakistan, Pakistan: Eye of the Storm (2002), went into a third edition in 2010.

He contributed to the Lonely Planet guide, Pakistan and the Karakoram Highway (2004).

In 2012, he co-wrote a radio play about the assassination of the Pakistani politician Salman Taseer titled Blasphemy and the Governor of Punjab, which was broadcast on BBC Radio 4 and the World Service.

In 2013, Bennett-Jones published his first book of fiction, Target Britain, a thriller set amid the war on terror.

== Personal life ==
His brother is Peter Bennett-Jones, founder and chairman of Tiger Aspect Television.
