= Max Pearson =

- Born: 1959 (age 65–66)
- Occupation(s): Journalist, broadcaster
- Notable credit(s): The World Today; Newshour

Max Pearson (born 1959) is a BBC journalist and news presenter with the BBC World Service, best known as one of the presenters of The World Today and Newshour.

== Career ==
After completing post-graduate training in broadcast journalism, Pearson worked for the BBC in domestic radio. Since the 1980s, he worked as a frontline news presenter with the BBC World Service. Since 2014, Pearson has also presented The History Hour, a weekly omnibus edition of the BBC World Service's daily history series Witness and Sporting Witness.

== Personal life ==
Pearson is married with two children, and is an alumnus of Keele University. He was raised partly in Zambia. In March 2011, he suffered a cardiac arrest during a 14-hour flight from Singapore to Heathrow, London. The cabin crew allegedly refused to have the aircraft diverted when Pearson became ill shortly after it took off.

== Awards ==
- Sony Radio Award for news (1997)
