= George Arney (journalist) =

BBC journalist

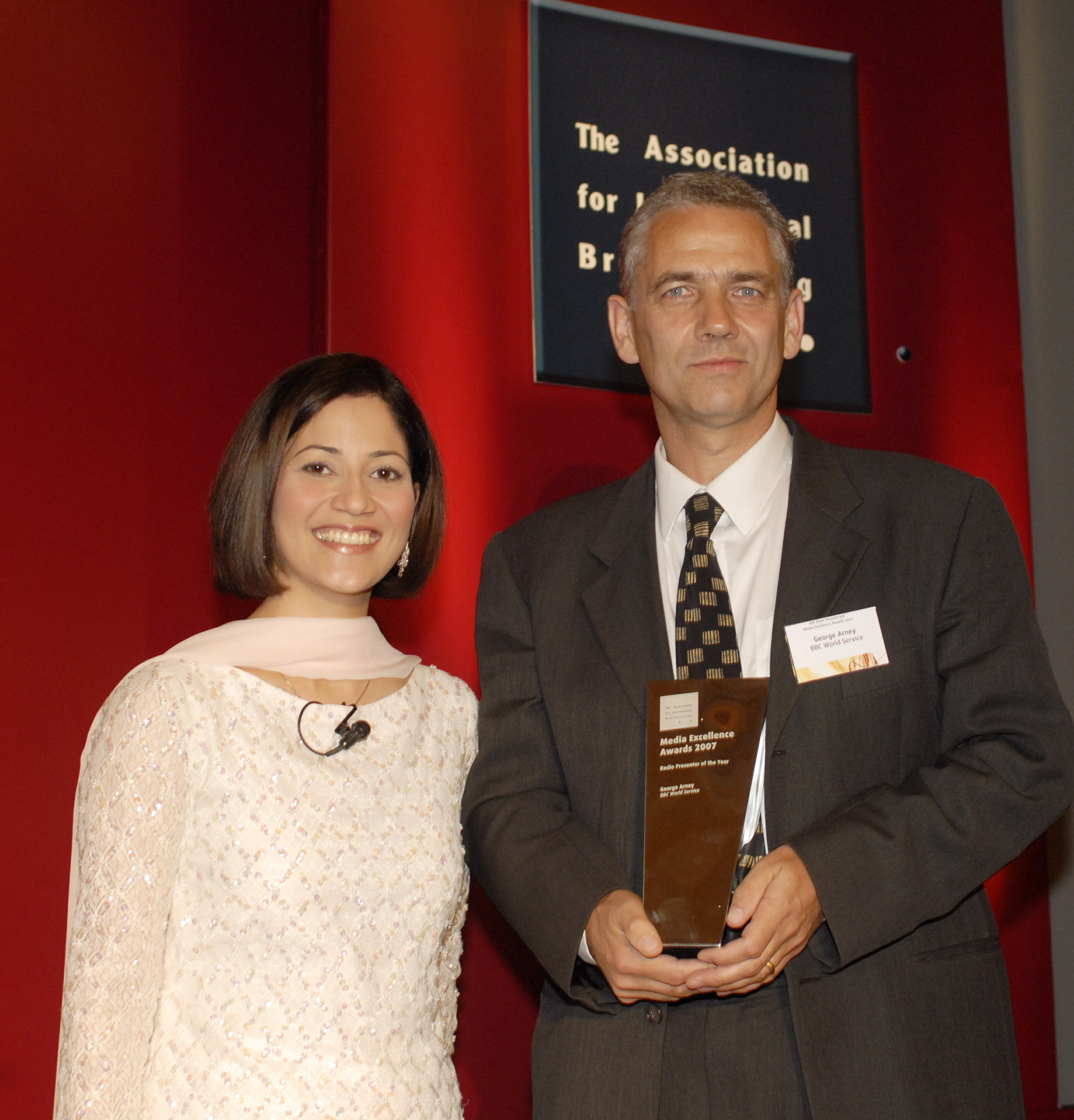
Mishal Husain and Arney

== Life ==
Arney was a BBC producer and a BBC correspondent in Pakistan in the 1980s. He hosted BBC Radio 4's Crossing Continents. He has written a book book on Afghanistan.

He was BBC correspondent in Pakistan from 1986 to 1988, and BBC correspondent in Sri Lanka from 1994 to 1996.

Arney has written for newspapers and journals including The Guardian and The Economist.

In 2007 he was named International Radio Personality of the Year by the Association for International Broadcasting (AIB).

== Personal life ==
Arney is separated from wife Razia Iqbal, a BBC journalist.
