= Talking Books (BBC radio program) =

BBC radio programme

Talking Books is a BBC radio and TV programme hosted by Razia Iqbal. Talking Books is shown by BBC World TV and the BBC news channel and is a half-hour interview programme with writers.
