= Newshour =

BBC World Service's news and radio programme

- Genre: News, current events, and factual
- Running time: 60 minutes
- Country of origin: United Kingdom
- Language: English
- Home station: BBC World Service; BBC Live News (2024-); BBC Radio 4 (2027-)
- Hosted by: James Coomarasamy; Lyse Doucet; Tim Franks; James Menendez; Andrew Peach; Rebecca Kesby; Jane Hill; Rajini Vaidyanathan
- Announcer: Various
- Recording studio: New Broadcasting House
- Original release: 1988 – present
- Website: Newshour

Newshour is BBC World Service's flagship international news and current affairs radio programme, broadcast twice daily: weekdays at 1400, weekends at 1300 and nightly at 2100 (UK time). There is also an additional online programme at 20:00 on weekdays. Each edition lasts one hour and consists of news bulletins on the hour and half hour, international interviews and in-depth news reports.

Newshour is also broadcast in the United States on various American Public Media stations. The programme is broadcast live from Broadcasting House in London and covers the major news of the day, often interviewing heads of state and government ministers.

== History ==
The programme was first broadcast in October 1988. Originally broadcast in a single timeslot at 2200 UTC, World Service planners responded to listener demand in April, 1991 by expanding to a two timeslot schedule at 1300 and 2100 UTC. In January 1992 under the directorship of John Tusa, who had received increased funding from the Foreign Office, Newshour added a third timeslot at 0500 UTC to serve listeners in the Americas. Later budget cuts eventually caused the elimination of the 0500 broadcast, and Newshour reverted to the present twice per day schedule.

On 17 June 2026, the BBC announced that, in 2027, Newshour would expand the 21:00BST edition to 22:00BST on BBC Radio 4, replacing The World Tonight which will be cancelled as part of a series of cuts to the corporation's news division, aimed at saving £500 million.

== Presenters ==
=== Current ===
Years	Presenter	Current role	
2010–present	James Coomarasamy	Main presenter	
1999–present	Lyse Doucet	Main presenter	
2012–present	Tim Franks	Main presenter	
?–present	James Menendez	Main presenter	
2013–present	Andrew Peach	Main presenter	
?–present	Rebecca Kesby	Main presenter	
2023–present	Nuala McGovern	Main presenter	
2027–present	Jane Hill	Main presenter	
2026–present	Rajini Vaidyanathan	Main presenter	
?–2025	Audrey Brown		Regular relief presenter
?–present	Roger Hearing		Regular relief presenter
?–present	Paul Henley		Regular relief presenter
?-present	Krupa Padhy		Regular relief presenter
1988–present	Owen Bennett-Jones		
?–present	Julian Worricker		
?–present	Celia Hatton		

On weekdays, the 14:00 and 21:00 GMT editions are presented by different presenters where as on weekends they are presented by the same presenter

=== Past ===
- Claire Bolderson, 1997–2012
- Razia Iqbal, 2011–2023
- Robin Lustig, 1989–2012
- Mary Ann Sieghart, 2008–10
- Paul Welsh
- Judy Swallow
- Alex Brodie
- Philippa Thomas 200?–21
- Nick Worrall, 1988 – ?
- Oliver Scott, 1988 – ?
- Hugh Prysor-Jones, 1988–1999
- Geoffrey Stern, 1988 – ?
- Max Pearson
- Kathryn Davies, 1991– ?
- Cindy Polemis, 1991–?
- Max Easterman, 1991 – ?
- Julian Marshall, 1991–2025

== See also ==
- BBC World Service, the home of Newshour
- BBC News
