= St. Joseph Channel =

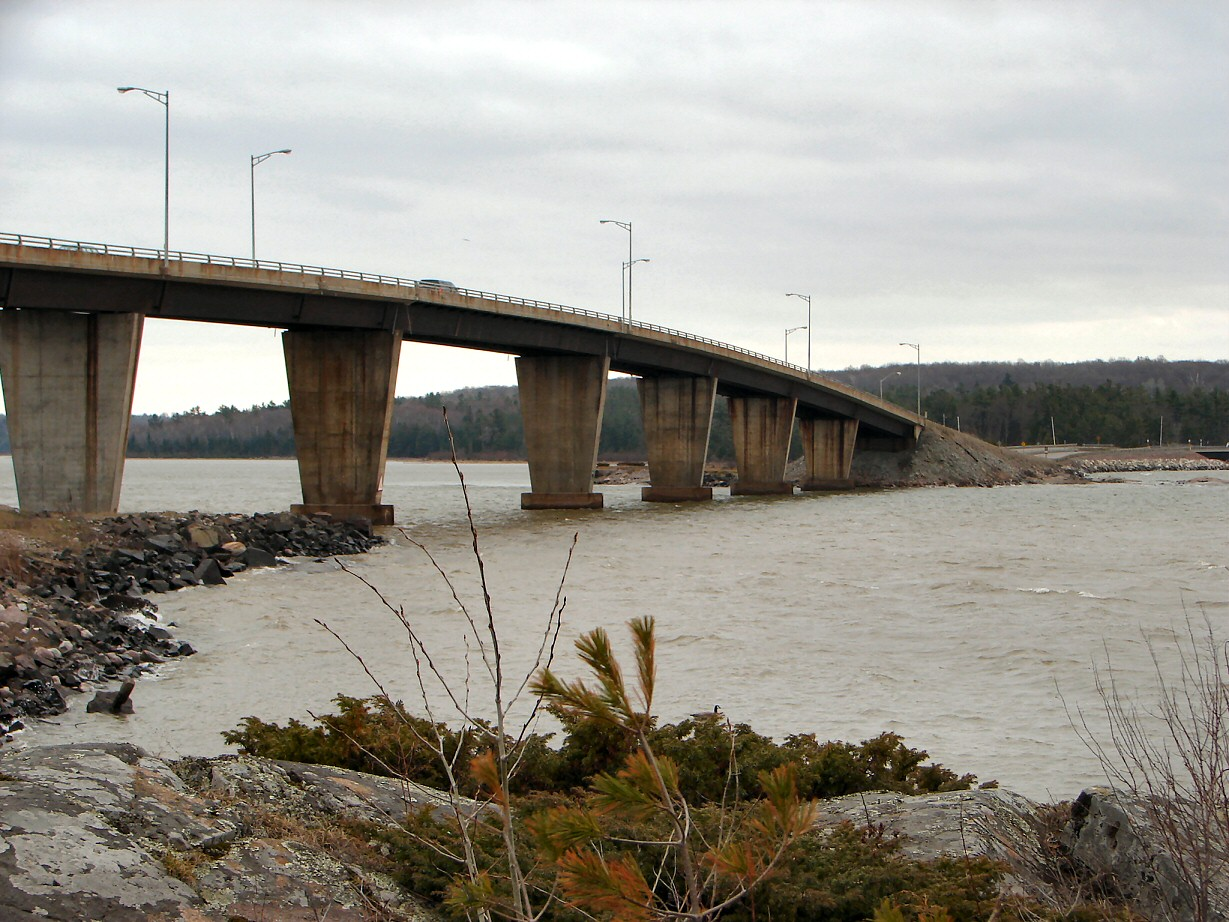

- Location in Ontario

Location
- Country: Canada, United States
- State: Michigan, Ontario
- District: Algoma District, Chippewa County

Physical characteristics
- Source: Lake George
  - coordinates: 46°20′21″N 84°06′31″W
- 2nd source: Middle Neebish Channel
  - coordinates: 46°19′16″N 84°08′33″W
- Mouth: North Channel
  - coordinates: 46°15′22″N 83°45′56″W

Basin features
- River system: Great Lakes Basin

The St. Joseph Channel is a strait in Algoma District, Northwestern Ontario, Canada and Chippewa County, Michigan, United States. It is in the Great Lakes Basin and connects the St. Marys River flowing through the Middle Neebish Channel between Neebish Island and Sugar Island at the northwest and Lake George/ East Neebish Channel between Sugar Island and the Ontario mainland at the north, with the North Channel between St. Joseph Island and the Ontario mainland at the east, and with the Munuscong Channel between Neebish Island and St. Joseph Island at the southwest. All of these waterbody elements are part of Lake Huron.

== Sources ==
- Map 12 (PDF) (Map). 1 : 1,600,000. Official road map of Ontario. Ministry of Transportation of Ontario. 2012-01-01.
- Restructured municipalities - Ontario map #4 (Map). Restructuring Maps of Ontario. Ontario Ministry of Municipal Affairs and Housing. 2006.
- "Oakridge, MI–ON" (PDF). 7.5-minute series. United States Geological Survey. 2011.
- "Oakridge OE E, MI–ON" (PDF). 7.5-minute series. United States Geological Survey. 2011.
