= Isabel Hilton =

Scottish journalist and broadcaster (born 1947)

Isabel Hilton OBE
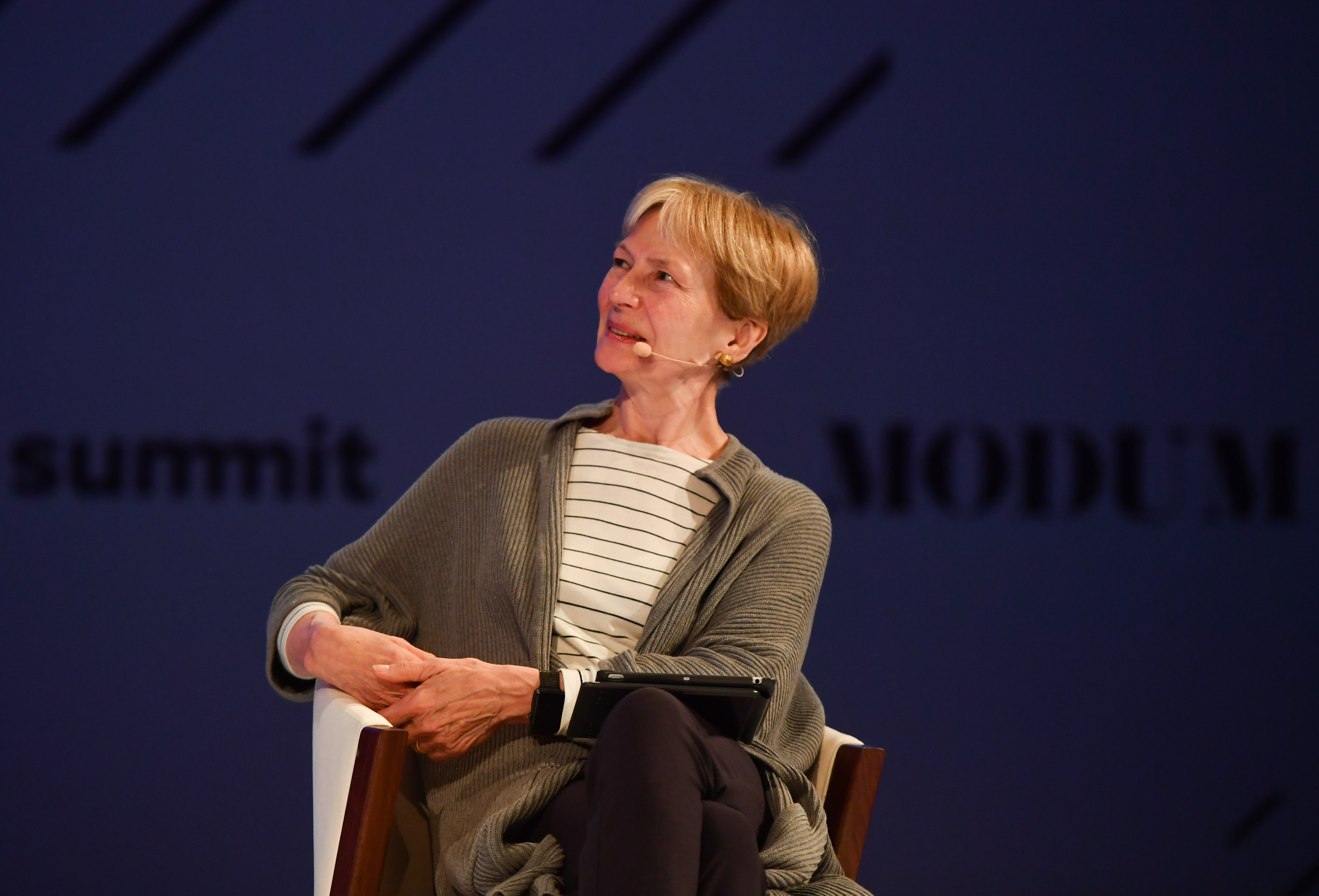
- Born: Isabel Nancy Hilton; 25 November 1947 (age 78); Aberdeen, Scotland
- Education: University of Edinburgh
- Occupations: Journalist and broadcaaster
- Spouse: Neal Ascherson
- Children: 2

Isabel Nancy Hilton OBE (born 25 November 1947) is a Scottish journalist and broadcaster, based in London.

Hilton's writing has appeared in publications including The New York Times, Los Angeles Times, New Statesman, The Economist, Granta, The Mail on Sunday, The Observer, Financial Times, El Pais, Le Monde, La Stampa, International Affairs, The World Today, The New European, Index on Censorship, Vogue, The Daily Telegraph, The Sunday Telegraph, The Times Literary Supplement, Foreign Policy, The Literary Review, London Review of Books, ChinaFile and Prospect magazine, where she is a contributing editor.

== Early life ==
Hilton attended school in Alford, Aberdeenshire, Bradford Girls' Grammar School (Yorkshire) and Walnut Hills High School (Cincinnati, Ohio). She graduated from Edinburgh University, where she studied Chinese to post-graduate level, subsequently studying at Beijing Languages Institute and Fudan University, Shanghai. In 1976, she briefly served as secretary of the Scotland-China Association, based at her University, and was placed on MI5's "black" list, which prevented her from accepting a job offer with the BBC in 1976.

== Career ==
Over a long career in national and international print, online and broadcast media, Isabel Hilton has covered global politics, conflict, development, human rights, climate change and environmental degradation. In recent years, her work has focused on the impacts of a rising China with particular emphasis on climate change and China's global environmental footprint.

In addition to her writing career, she has made several radio and television documentaries and presented both BBC Radio 4's current affairs programme The World Tonight and BBC Radio 3's arts and cultural strand, Night Waves. Hilton joined Scottish Television as a presenter in 1976, moving later that year to the Daily Express as feature writer after being blacklisted by MI5 from a job at the BBC. She left the Daily Express five months later to join the Sunday Times, where she subsequently held posts as feature writer, news reporter, Insight reporter and Latin America editor. She covered the Falklands War from Buenos Aires in 1982 and continued to cover Latin America until the Sunday Times became embroiled in the dispute over its move to Wapping. She left the Sunday Times to join the founding team at The Independent as Latin America Editor. In 1989, she became Europe Editor, covering the fall of Communism in Europe, then Chief Feature Writer.

In 1994, she left The Independent to work on a book, while also taking up a new role as presenter of The World Tonight (1995–98) on BBC Radio 4, and from 1999 as presenter of Nightwaves on BBC Radio 3. She contributed a regular column to The Guardian (1997–2003) and from 2000 to 2003 was a staff writer on The New Yorker magazine, reporting from Latin America, South Asia and Europe. From March 2005 to July 2007, she was editor and then editor-in-chief of openDemocracy.net. In 2006, Hilton founded ChinaDialogue, a fully bilingual not-for-profit newsroom dedicated to covering climate change with a particular focus on China. This was followed in 2010 by the Third Pole and later by www.dialogochino.net and www.chinadialogueocean.net. Hilton served as editor and CEO of the organisation, publishing reports from China, Latin America, east, south and Southeast Asia and the United States in a total of eleven languages. In 2021, she stepped back from her role as CEO to become Senior Adviser to the organisation, finally stepping down from that role in 2023.

In January 2023, Hilton became a contributing editor at Prospect Magazine. Her written work has also appeared in The New York Times, the Los Angeles Times, the New Statesman, The Economist, Granta, The Mail on Sunday, The Observer, Financial Times, El Pais, Le Monde, La Stampa, Lettres Internationale, International Affairs, The World Today, The New European, Index on Censorship, Vogue (British and American), The Daily Telegraph, The Sunday Telegraph, The Times Literary Supplement, Foreign Policy, The Literary Review, London Review of Books, ChinaFile and many other publications.

Her television and radio documentaries include:

- Petra And the General (BBC 1994)
- Kingdom Of the Lost Boy (BBC 1996)
- City On the Edge (BBC 1998)
- Condemned To Live (BBC 1999)
- Correspondent: the arrest of General Pinochet
- The Caravan of Death (BBC 2001)

She also reported several shorter films for BBC 2's Correspondent series.

Hilton's radio documentaries include The Bitter Pill, The Gesar Epic, Flowers in the Backyard, The Chinese Media, The Return of Faith, The End of Empire, The Uses of History in China, and The Shadow of the Emperor.

In 2007, Hilton delivered the Ben Pimlott Memorial Lecture at Somerset House, London; in 2019, she delivered the annual James Cameron memorial lecture at City St George's, University of London, on the subject: "Journalism with Chinese characteristics: reflections on media in the new era". In 2022, she delivered the Sue Lloyd-Roberts Memorial Lecture.

== Personal life ==
Hilton is married to journalist and author Neal Ascherson, with whom she has a son and a daughter. She was appointed Officer of the Order of the British Empire (OBE) in the 2009 Birthday Honours. She holds an Honorary Doctorate from Bradford University and an Honorary Doctorate of the university from Stirling University. Hilton is an active participant in a number of track 2 dialogues and meetings, including Konigswinter, the Club of Three, the UK Canada Symposium and the British-American Project. She has spoken at the World Economic Forum (China) and the Munich Security Conference and served as speaker of the jury for the Berlin-based Lettre Ulysses Award for Literary Reportage from 2001 to 2006, as a judge on the Amnesty International Media Awards, the Kurt Schock Awards and the James Cameron Awards. She chaired the jury of the George Orwell Prize for Journalism, 2022.

She is a regular discussion host at festivals and events, including HowTheLightGetsIn Festival and Web Summit (Lisbon), and as a commentator on Monocle Radio, BBC and other outlets, as a featured speaker in London Climate Week (2021), the FT Festival, the Edinburgh Book Festival and many others.

Past positions include:

- Contributing editor. Granta
- Fellow, the Asia Society, New York
- Board member Accountability 21,
- member of the advisory board of the Oxford Research Group
- member of the GE stakeholder panel,
- founding trustee of Free Word
- advisory board member and fellow of the British American Project.
- advisory board member OSF Global Fellowship Program.
- International co-chair, special project, Promoting social media and Public Participation in China's Green Development, China Council on International Cooperation on Environment and Development (2013)

She has also served as a member of the editorial board of International Affairs, the advisory board of the Latin America Bureau, the advisory board of the European Movement, the advisory board of the Association of Speakers of Chinese as a Second Language, and the editorial advisory board of the Bureau of Investigative Journalism,

== Board positions ==
Hilton chairs the board of the Centre for Investigative Journalism. She co-chairs the board of The Bureau of Investigative Journalism and is a non-executive director of E3G, the climate think tank.

== Publications ==
- The Search for the Panchen Lama, W. W. Norton & Company, 2000, ISBN 0393049698.
- The Falklands War 1982 ISBN 9780722182826 (co-author)
- The Fourth Reich: Klaus Barbie and the Neo-fascist Connection 1984 co-author, ISBN 0340344431
- The Best of Granta Travel , (Penguin Books / Granta 1982 ) contributing author, ISBN 0140140417
- The Best American Travel Writing , contributing author
- Betrayed, contributing author,
- The Rise of China (Smith Institute and Westminster University) contributing author,
- The Thinking Fan’s Guide to the World Cup, (Harper Perennial 2006) (contributing author) ISBN 978-0061132261
- Eating Mud Crabs in Kandahar , (University of California Press 2011) contributing author ISBN 978-0520268678
- Fifty Shades of Feminism, (Virago,2013) (contributing author) ISBN 9781844089451
- China and the Environment: The Green Revolution, (Zed Books, 2013) (contributing author)
- Mare Plasticum - The Plastic Sea: Combatting Plastic Pollution Through Science and Art (Springer Press 2020) (contributing author) ISBN 3030389448
- China's 19th Party Congress (World Scientific Press 2019) (contributing author) ISBN 1786345919

== Sources ==
- Rider, Nick; Blain, Harry; Whyte, Lara; Brinham, Natalie; Akehurst, Nathan (17 July 2007). "openDemocracy: a farewell salute". openDemocracy. Archived from the original on 2 October 2017.
