= Have Your Say =

Production
- Production company: BBC

Original release
- Network: BBC World News
- Release: 20 April 2008

Have Your Say is a weekly discussion-based television programme, produced by the BBC and broadcast on international news channel BBC World News and BBC World Service radio. Its last broadcast was on 20 April 2008. The programme linked to the "Have your say" section of the BBC News website, BBC News Online, which also maintains its own topics for contributors to voice their opinions on. The topics are mainly non-controversial. The main presenter of the television programme was Bridget Kendall, Diplomatic Correspondent for the BBC.

== See also ==
- World Have Your Say, aired daily at 17:05 GMT in most regions of the world on the BBC World Service
