= Carolyn Quinn =

British journalist and radio presenter

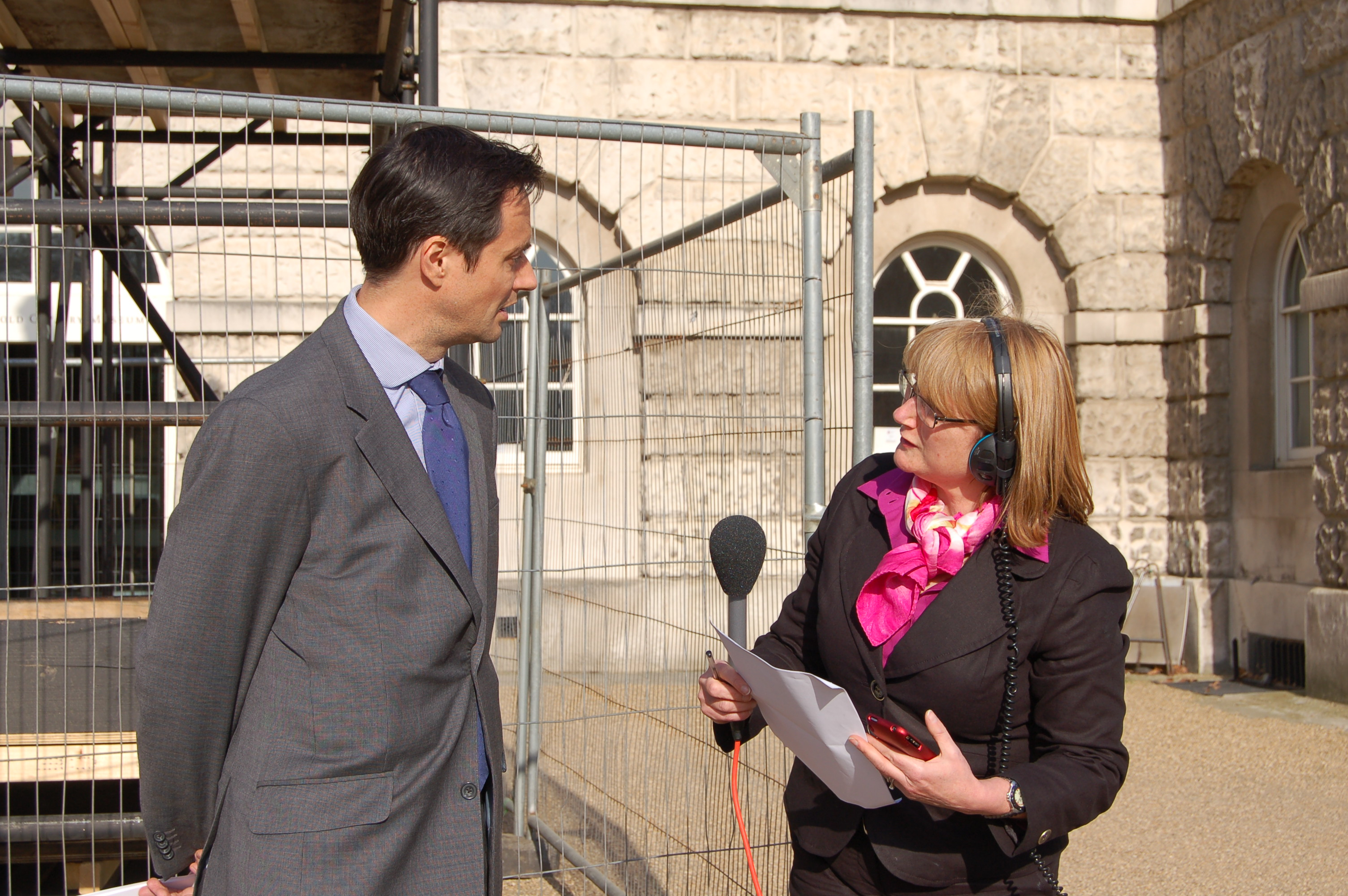
- Quinn (right) interviews Robin Niblett
- Born: Carolyn Quinn; 22 July 1961 (age 65); Camberwell, London, England
- Education: University of Kent
- Occupations: Journalist; Broadcaster
- Years active: 1984–present
- Notable credit(s): Today (2004–8); PM; The Westminster Hour
- Spouse: Nigel Morris (m.2003)

Carolyn Quinn (born 22 July 1961 in Camberwell, London) is a British journalist best known for her work on BBC Radio 4 as a political correspondent and for presenting the Today programme and PM.

== Early life ==
Quinn attended St Joseph's RC Primary School in Crayford, Dartford Grammar School for Girls and the University of Kent where she obtained a degree in French. She trained as a teacher, gaining a PGCE at the Institute of Education in London before becoming a French teacher at a London comprehensive school, but gave this up to be a ward clerk at Charing Cross Hospital. She joined Riverside Radio at the hospital.

== Career ==
She freelanced before joining the Irish Post and was then selected for a BBC Local Radio trainee scheme. After training and two years at BBC Radio Solent from 1987–9, she joined BBC's political and parliamentary team at Westminster in 1989 and became a political correspondent in 1994.

For 2011–2012 she was elected Chairman of the Houses of Parliament Press Gallery, the first female holder of the post.

=== BBC Radio 4 ===
Quinn was a presenter of PM from 2001 and the Today programme from 2004 to 2008, co-presenting her last programme with James Naughtie on Wednesday 26 March 2008. As the programme closed, she invoked Tony Blair's comments upon leaving office as British Prime Minister, wishing well to "friend and foe alike" and referring to a "rollercoaster", indicating that her departure from the programme may have been less than entirely amicable. She presented PM on Saturdays, and covered the weekday edition when Evan Davis was away. She also presented Pick of the Week several times and in January 2007 presented an edition of Woman's Hour.

Quinn became the regular presenter of Radio Four's The Westminster Hour from January 2007 following Andrew Rawnsley's departure in September 2006.

Quinn presented her last edition of PM, on 24 February 2023, announcing that she was retiring from full-time broadcasting. She also presented her last regular programme, The Westminster Hour two days later on 26 February, after hosting the programme for 16 years.

=== Times Radio ===
On 1st March 2026 Quinn co-presented Times Radio Breakfast alongside Calum Macdonald.

== Personal life ==
Carolyn Quinn married Nigel Morris, Political Editor of the i newspaper, and former political correspondent of the Daily Mirror, in Richmond upon Thames in June 2003.

She received an honorary doctorate from the University of Kent in 2013.
