= Babita Sharma =

English television newsreader (born 1977)

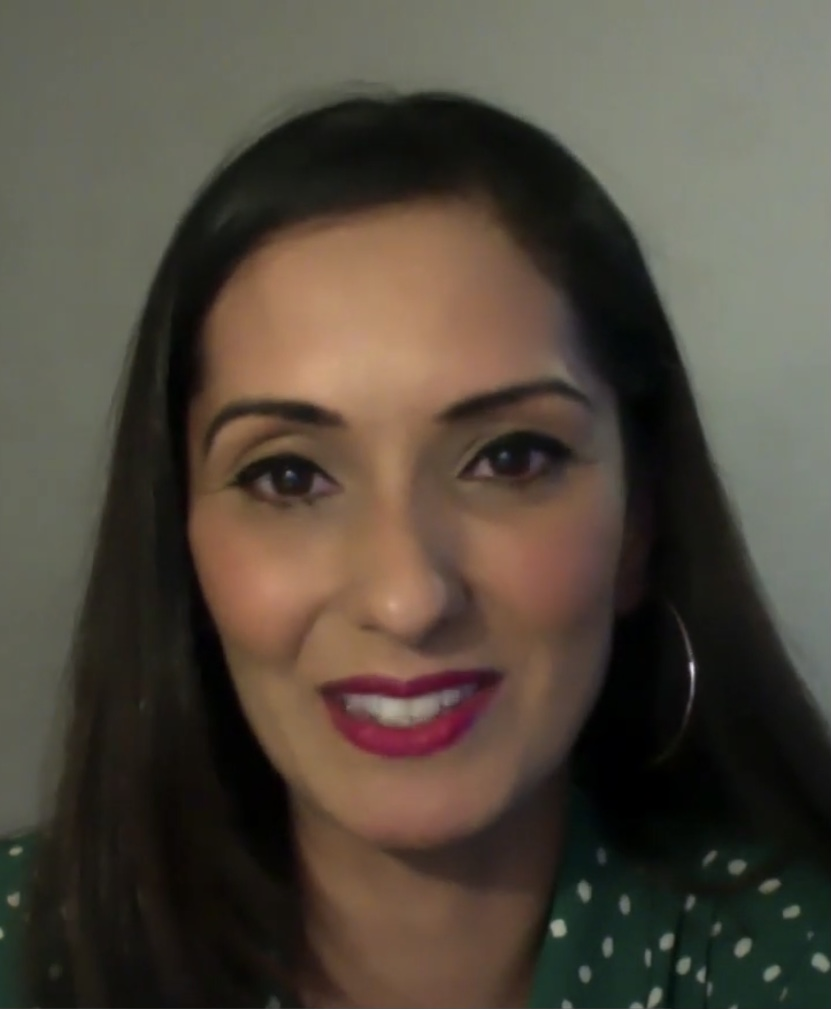
- Sharma in 2021
- Born: Babita Sharma; April 1977 (age 49); Reading, Berkshire, England
- Education: University of Wales (BA)
- Occupations: Journalist, News presenter
- Employer: BBC
- Notable credits: BBC Radio Wales; Thames Valley Television; Channel 4 FM; Ajman TV; BBC Radio Berkshire; Spotlight Channel Islands; BBC News; BBC World News; Newsday; World News Today; GMT; Impact with Yalda Hakim; Asia Business Report
- Spouse: Adam Patterson
- Children: 1
- Website: Babita Sharma on X

Babita Sharma (born April 1977) is a British television newsreader who worked on the domestic BBC News Channel and BBC World News, presenting the Newsday strand each Monday to Wednesday from London with Rico Hizon in Singapore. Sharma stopped presenting on BBC News during the COVID-19 pandemic in 2020.

== Early life and education ==
Sharma is of Indian descent and was born in 1977 at the Royal Berkshire Hospital in Reading, Berkshire. She has two older sisters. She lived above a number of corner shops around Reading and Caversham owned by her mother Prem and her father Ved. Her parents came from the Punjab in India, her father was born in what is now the Pakistan side of the Punjab.

She attended the University of Wales and graduated with a degree in journalism, film and broadcasting.

== Career ==
After completing her education, Sharma began working with BBC Radio Wales and Thames Valley Television. She moved to Dubai, working on radio for Channel 4 FM and for Ajman TV where she presented a weekly music programme. She returned to the UK in 2003 and began her BBC career at BBC Radio Berkshire as a travel presenter and producer. She then moved to the newsroom in Southampton, reporting and producing for BBC South Today. In 2007, she moved on to BBC Spotlight Channel Islands working as a video journalist and regular presenter of the evening bulletin.

Sharma transferred to the BBC News Channel in 2008, initially as presenter of the Your Money programme. In early 2009, she assumed the main business role and then moved to the BBC News Channel, BBC One and BBC World News in her current full-time presenting role. For the BBC World News programme Newsday, which began airing from its new studios on 31 July 2015, Sharma has served as live anchor from the main Broadcasting Centre in London, while Rico Hizon was assigned the main broadcasting role from Singapore. The "World Travel Market global trends report 2013", which was prepared for the World Travel Market and the Euromonitor International was the subject of a panel debate in which Sharma participated. She observed: "The global economy in 2013 has stabilized compared to 2012 with a 3.1% (gross-domestic-product) growth expected for the year. The International Monetary Fund predicts a further 3.8% increase during 2014".

She appeared on series 3 episode 7 of "Celebrity Eggheads" and presented the first two series of Supermarket Secrets with Gregg Wallace.

Sharma also hosts various ceremonies, such as the Angel Film Awards at the Monaco International Film Festival from 2011 to 2013 and the 2012 Wings of Hope Achievement Award ceremony. She also moderates panel discussions and speaks at conferences, such as the World Travel Market. In 2017 made the three part series Dangerous Borders: A Journey across Indian & Pakistan for BBC2. In December 2016 her documentary Booze, Beans & Bhajis: The Story of the Corner Shop was shown on the BBC4.

Sharma co-hosted the Asian Curry Awards 2018 at the Grosvenor House in London on Sunday 18 November 2018.

Since 2022, Sharma has provided the voice over for the opening of Loose Women, introducing the panellists at the start of each show.

== Personal life ==
Sharma is married to Adam Patterson. She gave birth to a daughter in May 2019. They moved to Belfast in February 2022.

== Publications ==
- The Corner Shop: Shopkeepers, the Sharmas and the making of modern Britain (18 April 2019)
