= Zuhura Yunus =

Tanzanian journalist (born 1969)

Honourable Zuhura Yunus Deputy Permanent Secretary

Deputy Permanent Secretary of Prime Minister's Office (Labour, Youth, Employment, and Persons with Disabilities)
- Incumbent
- Assumed office June 2024
- Prime Minister: Kassim Majaliwa

Director of State House Communications
- In office 30 January 2022 – 2024
- President: Samia Suluhu Hassan
- Preceded by: Jaffar Haniu

Personal details
- Born: Zuhura Yunus Abdallah; 1969 (age 56–57) London, England
- Citizenship: Tanzania
- Spouse: Fumbuka Nkwabi Mwanakilala (m. 2022)
- Education: Islamic University in Uganda (IUIU); (B.Sc.): University of Leicester; (Master of Mass communication)
- Occupation: Author and Journalist
- Known for: BBC Dira ya Dunia
- Website: kazi.go.tz

Zuhura Yunus (born in 1969) is a Tanzanian senior journalist and civil servant. She became the first person to broadcast on BBC World News wearing a hijab, the first Tanzanian woman to host BBC Dira ya Dunia, Focus on Africa and the first woman to be the director of State House communications.

== Early life and education ==
Zuhura was born in London, England in 1969. She is the second of three children, and the only girl. Her father was an army colonel, and her mother was an agricultural specialist with a Master of Science in agronomy. She initially focused on studying medicine, taking science studies during her secondary education, opting for the PCB combination (Physics, Chemistry and Biology).

She attended at Weruweru Secondary School from 1990 to 1994 in Moshi, Tanzania, then joined the Islamic University in Uganda (IUIU) from 1997 to 2000 in Mbale, Uganda, where she graduated with a Bachelor of Science in Botany and Zoology (natural sciences).

In 2002, she decided to pursue a career in journalism and went to study a basic certificate course in broadcasting and print media at the Tanzania School of Journalism (TSJ). In 2007, she earned a Master of Mass Communication at the University of Leicester in England.

== Career ==
After earning her degree in natural sciences, she returned to Tanzania in 2000. After struggling to find a job as a doctor, her brother advised her to join broadcasting. He informed her of a radio presenter opportunity at Times FM in Tanzania, because she was interested in music. She had doubts because she had not studied journalism.

In 2000, she joined Times FM Radio. She was one of the first presenters at Times FM radio. She hosted Sunrise's English morning show, the Independent Woman every Saturday, and Zee's music show A Cruise, and worked there for 3 years.

In 2003, she joined Uhuru FM Radio. She hosted Zee A show a show that was playing old songs, She worked there for a year and left due to a change in ownership of Uhuru FM Radio.

In 2004, she joined Mwananchi Communications as a correspondent. She was only on the news side when she started his correspondent career, but through her own encouragement she began writing articles. She worked there for 4 years and departed to advance her journalism studies.

=== BBC ===
In 2008, she joined BBC Swahili as a presenter and producer. She became the first Tanzanian woman to broadcast in Swahili on an international platform. Six years later, in 2014, Zuhura became the first Tanzanian woman to host Dira ya Dunia, the BBC's flagship Swahili news program broadcast globally and Focus on Africa. During her tenure, she gained recognition for her professional integrity, clear delivery, and commitment to delivering news that resonated with audiences across East Africa.

External videos
- Dira ya Dunia, 6 Feb 2020, 11:34, Dira ya Dunia Zuhura Yunus hosted the Swahili program Dira ya Dunia.

Zuhura contributed to programs broadcast on radio and television, including during the 2010 Tanzania elections, 2012 US elections, Hurricane Sandy, and Nelson Mandela's funeral

She also interviewed African leaders such as former president of Tanzania Jakaya Kikwete and Ugandan President Yoweri Museveni as part of reports on illegal wildlife trade.

An interview she conducted with opposition presidential candidate Edward Lowassa in 2015 provoked a storm of media attention in Tanzania and abroad.

Her work for the BBC World Service includes a special documentary on the ship MV Liemba, built by the Germans during World War I, one of the oldest surviving ships in the world, still in service in Kigoma, Tanzania.

In 2019, she became the first female anchor from Tanzania to host the Focus on Africa on television and the first person to broadcast on BBC World News while wearing a hijab.

External videos
- Focus on Africa, 28 December 2020, Focus on Africa Zuhura Yunus hosted the Focus on Africa.

In 2020, Zuhura spoke candidly about the challenges of journalism when she was at the Kilimanjaro Dialogue Institute, saying: "I write as a journalist; not a lady. Challenges abound. No doubt. You just work hard. Sometimes the problem is slackness. You have to take a tough stand in life. The world should understand what you are. You are not supposed to be the victim of that world. When you're out in the field hakuna kulala (literally no chance for sleep). There will be no time for extramural activity."

After 14 years at the BBC, she resigned on 14 January 2022. The announcement came several months after she wrote a biography of Biubwa Amour Zahor, a female political activist during the Zanzibar revolution in 1964.

== Civil servant ==
On 29 January 2022, President Samia Suluhu Hassan appointed her the Director of Presidential Communication.

External videos
- leaders talking to correspondents, 6 June 2024, Ikulu Zuhura Yunus and other leaders talking to correspondents.

On 6 June 2024, President Suluhu appointed her the Deputy Permanent Secretary in the Prime Minister's Office (Labour, Youth, Employment, and Persons with Disabilities).

== Personal life ==
She is a Muslim and married to Fumbuka Nkwabi Mwanakilala on 29 December 2022 at Maamur Mosque in Dar es Salaam.

== Books ==
- Biubwa Amour Zahor: Mwanamke Mwanamapinduzi: The Biography (independently published,1 November 2021) ISBN 9987735843
