= Focus on Africa (radio programme) =

BBC World Service radio programme

- Other names: Focus
- Genre: News, current events, and factual
- Running time: 23 minutes
- Country of origin: Kenya
- Language: English
- Home station: BBC World Service
- Recording studio: Bush House (1960 - 2012); Broadcasting House (2012 - 2025); BBC Nairobi (2025 - present)
- Original release: 15 August 1960
- Website: BBC Focus on Africa

Focus on Africa is the BBC World Service's flagship news and current affairs programme about Africa, and it is one of the BBC's longest running radio programmes.

It is currently a podcast broadcast on the BBC five days a week at 15:00 and 17:00 GMT. The programme is produced and presented from Nairobi, Kenya.

Focus on Africa is also the name used for a television news programme launched internationally on the BBC News Channel in 2012.

== History ==
Focus on Africa officially launched on 15 August 1960, airing three editions a week for 15 minutes on shortwave. It was produced by a team at Bush House in London, home of the BBC World Service until 2012.

Over its decades-long history, Focus on Africa has reported on many of the major political, social, humanitarian, cultural and sporting developments across Africa and the world.

Its coverage has included the independence of numerous African states, the emergence of Zimbabwe and South Sudan as independent countries, the rise and fall of Idi Amin’s regime in Uganda, the Ethiopian famine, the election of Africa’s first female head of state, Nelson Mandela’s release from prison and the end of apartheid in South Africa, the Ebola epidemic, and major cultural and sporting events, including the first FIFA World Cup to be held on the African continent in South Africa in 2010.

Focus on Africa also featured regular sports news and slots for arts and entertainment. The Resident Presidents, a satirical comedy sketch portraying two fictional African heads of state, Olushambles and Kibarkingmad, through exaggerated political stereotypes, was introduced as a Friday feature of the programme. It has annoyed some who see it as a veiled dig at African leadership. The programme aired seven days a week with three weekday editions and a two single editions on Saturdays and Sundays. Later, the weekend programmes were abolished. Focus on Africa also reached a global audience, and especially Africans in the diaspora, through its Africa Today podcast which has also ended.

== Digital media ==
In 2023, Focus on Africa evolved from a live, breaking news radio programme into a recorded podcast. The decision to switch the programme format was highly controversial and continues to divide opinion, especially among devoted listeners.

The new podcast tackles three main stories and is broadcast on the World Service and digitally. As of 2025, the entire Focus on Africa outfit moved from London to the BBC Nairobi Bureau in Kenya .

== Presenters ==
Throughout its long history, Focus on Africa has been presented by successive generations of BBC journalists, with a number of regular and relief presenters contributing to the programme across its radio era and, more recently, its development as a podcast:

=== Current ===
Years	Presenter	Current role
2025 - present	Nkechi Ogbonna	Main presenter
2026 - present	Charles Gitonga	Relief presenter

=== Past ===
- Akwasi Sarpong
- Akwe Amosu
- Audrey Brown
- Bola Mosuro
- Chris Bickerton
- David Amanor
- Esau Williams
- Elizabeth Ohene
- Fred Dove
- Hassan Arouni
- Israel Wamala
- Joseph Warungu
- Josephine Hazeley
- Julian Marshall
- Komla Dumor
- Kwabena Mensah
- Paul Bakibinga
- Peter Okwoche
- Rick Wells
- Robin White
- Sophie Ikenye
- Uduak Amimo
