= Yen Ara Asaase Ni =

Unofficial national anthem of Ghana

Yɛn Ara Asaase Ni
English: This Is Our Own Land
- Lyrics: Ephraim Amu, 1929
- Music: Ephraim Amu, 1929

Audio sample
- Yɛn Ara Asaase Ni (Vocal): file; help

"Yɛn Ara Asaase Ni" (English: "This Is Our Own Land") is the unofficial national anthem of Ghana. It was written and composed by Ephraim Amu in 1929. It was composed in Twi by Amu himself and not translated as some may claim an original version in Ewe language.

== Anthem ==
The first line which is " ɛyɛ ahoɔden de ma yɛn" This translates in English as "Our cherished prized homeland" or "Our beloved homeland". It was composed at the time when the Gold Coast was in search of an anthem to replace the colonial one from the United Kingdom, "God save the King". It was among the four anthems shortlisted. God Bless Our Homeland Ghana by Philip Gbeho was the one that was eventually selected.

The song is often played or sung during national occasions in Ghana. Many people, however, continue to lobby for the current Ghana national anthem to be replaced by this song.

== Lyrics ==
The patriotic song "Yɛn Ara Asaase Ni" was written by Ephraim Amu. The title version translates into English as "This Is Our Own Native Land"; it evokes a message of nationalism, and each generation doing their best to build on the works of the previous generation.

Yɛn Ara Asaase Ni (Akuapim Twi)	Yɛn Ara Asaase Ni (English translation)
First stanza
Yɛn ara asaase ni; Ɛyɛ abɔ den den de ma yεn, Mogya a nananom hwie gu Nya de to hɔ ma yɛn, Aduru me ne wo nso so, Sε yɛbɛyɛ bi atoa so. Nimdeɛ ntraso, nkoto-kranne; Ne pɛsɛmenkomenya, Adi yɛn bra mu dεm, ama yɛn asaase hɔ dɔ atomu sɛ.	This is our own native land; What a priceless heritage, Acquired with the blood our ancestors shed for us; It is now our turn to continue what our ancestors started Bragging of educational achievements; Propaganda and greed for material things, And bad lifestyles are destroying our nation, and disgracing it.
Chorus
(Chorus 2x): Ɔman no, sɛ ɛbɛyɛ yie o Ɔman no, sɛ ɛrenyɛ yie o; Ɛyɛ nsɛnnahɔ sɛ, Ɔmanfo bra na ɛkyerɛ. Ɔman no, sɛ ɛbɛ yɛ yie o! Ɔman no, sɛ ɛrenyɛ yie o!; Ɛyɛ nsɛ nahɔ sɛ, Ɔmanfo bra na ɛkyerɛ.	(Chorus 2x): Whether or not this nation prospers! Whether or not this nation prospers!; Clearly depends on the character of the citizens of the nation. Whether or not this nation prospers! Whether or not this nation prospers!; Clearly depends on the character of the citizens of the nation.
Second stanza
Nhoma nimdeɛ huhugyan, ngyan ana ade anyara kwa; Ne ɔbrakyew de ɛsɛe, ɔman na ɛbɔ no ahohora; Asoɔmerɛ ne obupa yɔnko yiyɛ di pɛ daa, Ahofama ntetekwaam ma nnipa biara yiyɛ de; Ɛno mmom na ɛde asomdwee ne nkɔsoɔ pa brɛ ɔman. Ɔman no, sɛ ɛbɛyɛ yie o! Ɔman no, sɛ ɛrenyɛ yie o!; Ɛyɛ nsɛnnahɔ sɛ, Ɔmanfo bra na ɛkyerɛ.	Obedience and respect; Caring for the welfare of one another everyday, Selflessness in the traditional way; Ensures each person’s welfare, That is what will bring peace and prosperity to our nation. Whether or not this nation prospers! Whether or not this nation prospers!; Clearly depends on the character of the citizens of the nation.
