= Sophie Ikenye =

Kenyan news presenter

- Born: Kenya
- Citizenship: Kenyan
- Education: Kenya Institute of Mass Communication
- Occupations: Journalist and presenter
- Notable work: Focus on Africa (TV programme); Focus on Africa (radio programme)
- Awards: 2017 - 100 Most Influential Young Africans; 2017 - 100 Most Influential Young Kenyans

Sophie Ikenye is a news presenter from Kenya. She was a main presenter for Focus on Africa (TV programme) on BBC World News. She worked in the broadcasting industry in Kenya for 12 years before joining the BBC.

== Career ==
Ikenye studied mass communication in Kenya and got an internship at the Kenya Broadcasting Corporation (KBC). She worked at KBC, Citizen TV, and NTV Kenya.

She applied for a position at the BBC World Service in London which was looking for three presenters from East, West and South Africa, and got the job. In 2009 she started presenting Focus on Africa's radio edition, which she did for three years before the program went onscreen in 2012 where she continued to present it and was one of the main presenters of the show.

Ikenye has covered key events in Africa, including the 2011 Nigerian presidential elections, the Libya crisis and led the coverage of the 2013 Kenyan elections. She has interviewed more than 10 African presidents and other prominent personalities.

In 2017, Ikenye alongside other BBC presenters visited Uganda where they broadcast Focus on Africa for a week. She also guest celebrity anchored the PM Live news on Urban TV.

== Awards ==
In 2016, Ikenye was listed on the 100 Most Influential Young Africans by Africa Youth Awards. She was also listed on the 100 Most Influential Young Kenyans.

== See also ==
- Nancy Kacungira
- Lukwesa Burak
- Komla Dumor
