= Ola Naguib =

Egyptian TV producer

Ola Naguib (Arabic: علا نجيب) is an Egyptian TV producer of Middle East Business Report, a weekly business program on BBC World News. Naguib joined the BBC team in Dubai in 2007. Before that, she worked for the Saudi television network, MBC. She spent 3 years in publishing both in the UAE and in Egypt. Naguib studied Mass Communications and Journalism at the American University in Cairo.

== See also ==
- Middle East Business Report
- Nima Abu-Wardeh
- BBC World News
