= Turkson =

Turkson is a surname. Notable people with the surname include:

- Ato Turkson (1933–1993), Ghanaian composer and musicologist
- Kwamena Turkson (born 1976), Swedish boxer
- Peter Turkson (born 1948), Ghanaian Catholic cardinal
