= Mawuena Trebarh =

Ghanaian businesswoman (1971–2024)

- Born: Mawuena Adzo Dumor; 12 April 1971; Ghana
- Died: 10 April 2024 (aged 52)
- Education: University of Jos (BSc); Bentley College (MBA)
- Board member of: Movenpick Ambassador Hotel Ghana
- Spouse: Divine Trebarh
- Children: 1
- Relatives: Philip Gbeho (grandfather); Victor Gbeho (uncle); Komla Afeke Dumor (brother)
- Website: mawuenatrebarh.com

Mawuena Adzo Trebarh (née Dumor; 12 April 1971 – 10 April 2024) was a Ghanaian business executive, investor and geologist. Trebarh was the first woman to be appointed the CEO of the Ghana Investment Promotion Centre (GIPC), serving from 2013 to 2017 as well as the first female underground exploration geologist, amidst a 10,000-strong male-workforce mine site in the Ashanti Region.

She was also the first female Board Chair of Movenpick Ambassador Hotel Ghana. Trebah worked in both private and public sectors.

== Early life and education ==
Mawuena Trebarh was born in Ghana and attended a university in Nigeria. Her father, Ernest Dumor, is a retired professor of sociology and development studies, a former Electoral Commissioner and founding executive secretary and adviser to the National Identification Authority. Her mother, Cecilia Dumor, who died in 2008, was an educator, editor and publisher of secondary school textbooks.

Mawuena's maternal grandfather, Philip Gbeho, was the composer of the National Anthem of Ghana and the music master of Achimota School. Her paternal grandfather, Michael Dumor, was a pioneer in the Catholic Education Project in the Volta Region beginning in the 1930s. Her uncle is the Ghanaian diplomat Victor Gbeho.

Mawuena was the eldest of three children, and her siblings are the late Komla Afeke Dumor of the BBC and Dr Korshie Dumor, an internal medicine specialist and nephrologist based in the United States.

Mawuena Trebarh was a graduate of the University of Jos in Plateau State, Nigeria, where she graduated with a Bachelor of Science degree in Geology and Mining in September 1996. She later studied for an MBA in Management and Strategic Planning at the McCallum Graduate School of Business, Bentley College in Waltham, Massachusetts, in 2002.

== Career ==
=== 2020 NDC Campaign ===
In 2020, Trebarh was named as the deputy spokesperson to the John Mahama and the National Democratic Congress (NDC) Election 2020 Campaign. She served as the spokesperson and Head of communications for the office of the vice-presidential candidate Jane Naana Opoku-Agyemang.

=== Inspire Africa Consult ===
As the Founding Director and Chief Business Strategist of Inspire Africa Consult, Trebarh led the business strategy-consulting firm.

=== GIPC ===
Trebarh was the first woman to be appointed substantive Chief Executive Officer of the Ghana Investment Promotion Centre (GIPC), from April 2013 to January 2017, where she was in charge of driving investment into the country. During her time as CEO, foreign direct investment of US$1.12 billion was recorded in the first quarter of 2015, representing an increase of more than 1000% over the same period in 2014. As CEO, Mawuena increased the Centre's income from GHS 7.9 million (approx. USD $700,000) to GHS 18.1 million (approx. USD $1.5 million) in 36 months, representing an increase of almost 230%.

=== Scancom (MTN) ===
From 2007 to 2011, Trebarh held the position of Corporate Services Executive at MTN Ghana, where she was responsible for overseeing corporate communications, government and regulatory relations, the MTN Ghana Foundation, legal matters, and company secretarial duties. In this role, she acted as the corporate spokesperson for the company and was involved in all aspects of reputation management.

=== Newmont ===
Between 2003 and 2007, Trebarh was the Manager of Communications for Newmont Ghana Ltd, where she developed and oversaw the execution of the world's largest gold producer's public relations and communications strategies in Ghana, the West African sub-region and the African continent in general.

She also promoted and maintained the company's image within Ghana through communications strategies including regular interaction with the news media, trade and interest groups, government officials and other stakeholders, as well as Newmont management within Ghana and at the corporate level.

=== Ashanti Goldfields ===
In 1996, Trebarh began her career at Ashanti Goldfields Company Ltd, where she was the first female underground exploration geologist. During that period, she planned and implemented exploration-drilling programmes involving supervision of 15 to 20 men underground drilling teams with assignments at more than 1500 m below surface.

She was then invited to the Resource Evaluation Department, where she assisted in the generation of three-dimensional computer models of gold deposits in Ghana, Guinea, Tanzania, Zimbabwe and Burkina Faso. In this role, she conducted a complex quantitative analysis of exploratory drilling data resulting in declaration of 80.4 million ounces of gold reserves at spot price of $300/oz. over a two-year period and edited data reports for declared ounces quoted in all quarterly/ annual reports and corporate announcements.

Trebarh also worked as an Investor Relations Officer at Ashanti Goldfields, where she was responsible for retaining content expert status on strategic planning and new business development initiatives, acting as primary interface between the company and international investment community, stock exchanges and senior analysts from Goldman Sachs, Merrill Lynch, CIBC, among others. She was also responsible for tracking international reactions to corporate announcements, made recommendations regarding market sentiments, counseling management on responses.

== Personal life ==
Mawuena was married to Divine Trebarh, a Flight Lieutenant of the Air Force in the Ghana Armed Forces, and they had a daughter, Katherine Joy. She called for changes to business practices in Ghana and increased female representation in work and media.

Mawuena Trebarh died on 10 April 2024, at the age of 52.

== Awards and recognition ==
Mawuena won many awards including:

- Millennium Leadership Forum Award for championing excellence in trade investment and agro-processing
- National Youth Role Model Award for being a role model and youth leader
