= The State House =

The State House may refer to:

- State House (Mauritius)
- State House (Tanzania)
