= Joyce Omondi =

Kenyan gospel singer

- Born: Kenya
- Origin: Nairobi, Kenya
- Genres: Gospel music
- Years active: 2010 - present
- Labels: Conqueror
- Website: Joyce Omondi

Joyce Omondi is a Kenyan gospel singer and media personality.

== Early life and education ==
Omondi was born in Nairobi and where she studied before proceeding to Knox College in the United States from 2006 to 2010 where she majored in both Economics and Integrated International Studies. She was a Sophomore Senator and a Knox Ambassador while in college.

She learnt to sing and play the piano, and started performing early in life at church gatherings in Woodley, Nairobi and later graduated to singing in the Church choir. In Knox College she was part of the Harambee Choir.

== Music career ==
On returning to Kenya, Omondi released a series of gospel singles and collaborations including Conqueror and Kweli (English: "Truly"). Kweli is one of her most popular hits and was dedicated to her father who survived the 1998 bomb blast at the American Embassy in Nairobi.

Omondi is a co-host of the Rauka Gospel Music show on Citizen TV in Kenya. She quit the show in 2013 to pursue a master's degree in International Development at the Georgetown University in Washington.

In 2013 she won the Groove Awards for Video of the Year category.

== Marriage ==
She is married to award winning and celebrated BBC Focus on Africa News Anchor Waihiga Mwaura in 2018.

== See also ==
- Music of Kenya
- Gospel music
- Groove Awards
