= Robin White =

Robin White may refer to:

- Robin White (journalist) (born 1944), BBC journalist and playwright
- Robin White (artist) (born 1946), New Zealand artist
- Robin White (tennis) (born 1963), professional tennis player
- Robin White (footballer) (born 1960), Australian rules footballer
- Robin Bantry White (born 1947), Irish Anglican priest
