= National Pledge Of Ghana =

Ghanaian oath

The National Pledge of Ghana is recited immediately after the national anthem "God Bless Our Homeland Ghana" and is as follows:

I promise on my honour
to be faithful and loyal to
Ghana my motherland.
I pledge myself to the service of Ghana
with all my strength and with all my heart.
I promise to hold in high esteem.
Our heritage, won for us through the blood and toil of our fathers; and I pledge myself in
all things to uphold and defend the good name of Ghana.
So help me God.

== "God Bless Our Homeland Ghana" ==
"God Bless Our Homeland Ghana" is the national anthem of Ghana, after which the National Pledge of Ghana is recited.
