= Amina Yuguda =

Nigerian journalist

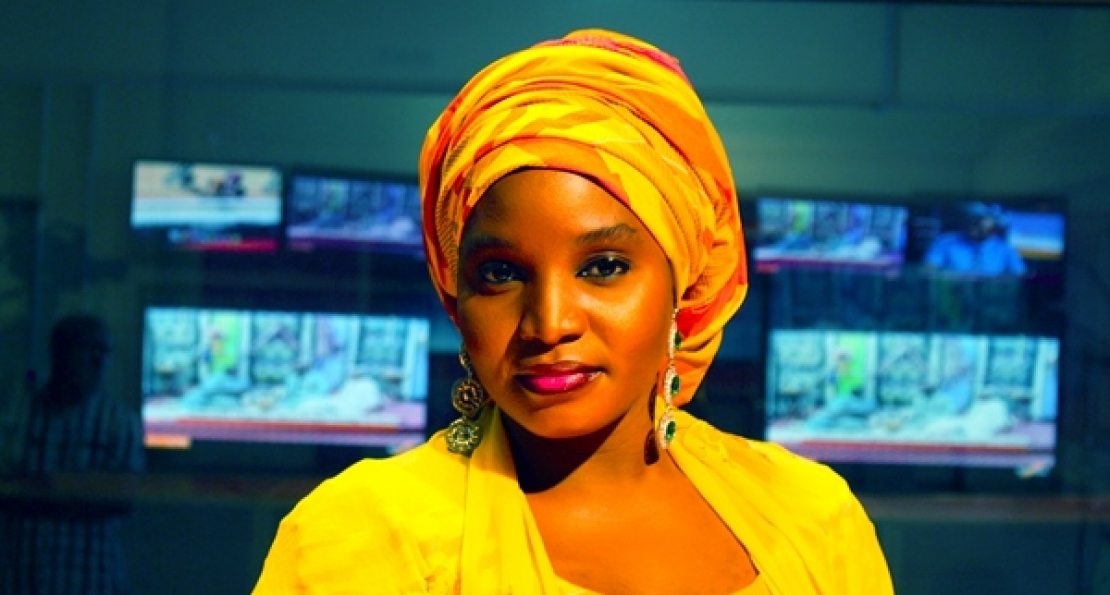
- Born: Amina Yuguda; Yola, Adamawa State
- Employer: American University of Nigeria
- Known for: Journalism
- Awards: 2017BBC World News Komla Dumor Award

Amina Yuguda is a Nigerian journalist from Yola, Adamawa state and news presenter with local network Gotel Television. She focuses on profiling high stories on Northern Nigeria especially around the Boko Haram insurgency. She has won the 2017 BBC World News Komla Dumor Award.

She currently works at the American University of Nigeria as an Assistant Director in the office of the Vice President for University Relations.

Yuguda produced a mini-documentary series called The Real Africa.

== Life and career ==
In July 2020 Amina Yuguda participated as a speaker at the International Organization for Migration Ireland conference on data's impact in countering misinformation. She served as the Communications Specialist for the USAID SENSE project, aiding children's remote learning during the COVID-19 pandemic in Adamawa and Gombe states. In July 2020 Amina Yuguda also served as Rapporteur for the UNFPA/AUN Gender-Based Violence in Emergencies Cohort in North-East Nigeria.

In 2017 Amina received the BBC Komla Dumor Award for African Journalism which made her the 2nd person to win the award in Nigeria. She gained experience working at BBC London on the News at 6 and 10, reporting from Lake Victoria and hosting the BBC Africa Debate in Ghana in February 2018. She chaired the Royal African society's annual lecture at the school of Oriental and African Studies in London School of, where she interviewed Professor Carlos Lopes, a renowned development economist and former head of the UN Economic Commission for Africa. Recognized for her achievements, she was nominated as a delegate at the African Union/UN Women African Women Leadership Summit in Ethiopia in 2018. Her involvement extended to speaking on the culture panel at the University of Warwick Africa summit in Coventry and moderating the inaugural Financial Times Nigeria Summit.

== Awards and recognition ==
In 2017 she won the third BBC World News Komla Dumor Award. which made her the second Nigeria to win the award, after Didi Akinyelure in 2016.
