= In Business Africa =

BBC Africa Programme

- Created by: BBC Africa for BBC World News
- Presented by: Nancy Kacungira; Lerato Mbele
- Countries of origin: Nigeria; South Africa
- Original language: English

Production
- Production locations: Studio B, Broadcasting House, London
- Running time: 26 minutes

Original release
- Network: BBC World News
- Release: 1 February 2019 – present

Related
- Africa Business Report; Focus on Africa

In Business Africa is a BBC news programme broadcast on BBC World News globally and on local partner channels of the BBC in African countries. The programme is presented by Nancy Kacungira in Lagos, Nigeria and Lerato Mbele in South Africa. The programme gives an in-depth look at the economic trends shaping the African continent, with interviews, discussions and informative features about different business topics in Africa.

== Presenters ==
=== Current ===
Years	Presenter	Current role
2019–present	Nancy Kacungira	Main Presenter
2019–present	Lerato Mbele	Main Presenter
