= Ndume Green =

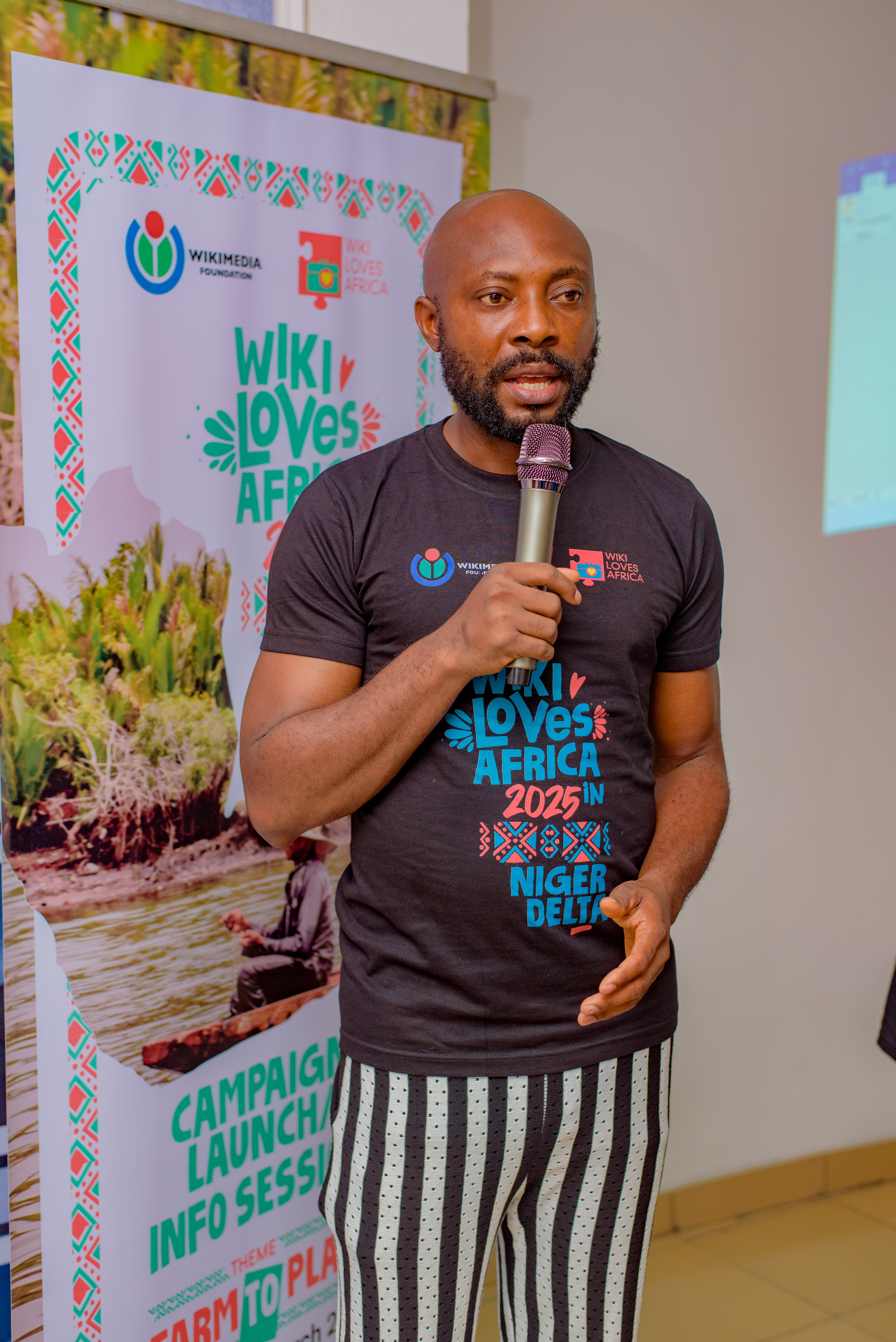
- Green at the Wiki Loves Africa 2025 in Niger Delta Launch and Info session
- Awards: Nelson Mandela Nigeria Alumni Washington Fellowship Award

Ndume Green is a Nigerian International journalist who hails from Ogoni in Rivers State Nigeria. He is the founder of CapitalTv. Ndume Green who is a 2018 finalist of the BBC Komla Dumor Award for African Journalism and 2018 winner of the Nelson Mandela Nigeria Alumni Washington Fellowship Award is the CEO and Founder of Capital TV Nigeria and one of Nigeria's largest indigenous online broadcast channel, Ogonitv.

Ndume Green was an intern at Crystal Clear Lens, a Ghanaian Local News Outlet in 2009 while he was pursuing his journalism degree. He is currently building the Capital Film and Creatives Village in Saakpenwa, Ogoni Rivers State Nigeria. The Capital Film & Creatives Village (CFCV) is a purpose-built creative innovation hub located in Saakpenwa, Tai Local Government Area of Rivers State. Established by Capital Media Group, the village is designed to nurture the next generation of filmmakers, journalists, photographers, digital content creators, and creative entrepreneurs through industry-driven training, mentorship, and access to modern production facilities. Beyond skills development, CFCV serves as a centre for storytelling, cultural preservation, media innovation, and enterprise development.
