= Emmanuel Gyimah Labi =

Ghanaian composer, conductor, and music professor

Emmanuel Gyimah Labi (born 27 September 1950 in Accra) is a Ghanaian composer, conductor, and music professor. He is a graduate of the Achimota School and a former conductor of the National Symphony Orchestra Ghana.

In 1971, Labi became a member of the Ghana Broadcasting Corporation Orchestra, where he played cello and was also involved in composition. He was a member of the orchestra for six years. During this time, he also studied for a bachelor's degree in music and philosophy at the University of Ghana, graduating in 1976. His tutors included Ato Turkson and Joseph Hanson Kwabena Nketia. After graduation, Labi undertook further musicological study at the University of Illinois and the University of Cincinnati College-Conservatory of Music. In 1984, he began lecturing at the University of Nigeria and, later, at Mercy College in New York and the University of Ghana.

Between 1988 and 1997, Labi was the director of the National Symphony Orchestra Ghana. As a composer, his music incorporates indigenous musical practices.

He married Mary Margaret Blicharz on 31 August 1985. They have one daughter.

== Selected works ==
=== Orchestral ===
- Symphony no. 1, "Essi-Ataa", Op. 20, (1983–4)
- Gya Nhyira (Baptism by Fire), Op. 26 (1996)

=== Chamber music ===
- Gentle Winds, Op. 5, for violin and pianoforte (1973)
- Tunes of the Fisherfolks, Op. 10, for octet (1974)
- Aseda, Op. 6, for duet (1975)
- From the Durbar, Op. 7, for duet (1978)
- String Quartet no. 1, "At the Immaculate Bee Hive" (1982)
- Visions of Space, for flute, clarinet and pianoforte (1983)
- 2 Ancient Perspectives, Op. 24, for tuba (1992)
- Ancient Perspectives no. 3, Op. 26, timpani concerto (1993)
- 7 Dialects in African Pianism (1986–2011), consisting of:
  - The Hunters' Song (1986)
  - Lotus (1987)
  - Earthbeats (1988)
  - Lullaby (1991)
  - Tenderly Loving a Rose (1993)
  - Larterian Placid Streams (2009)
  - Romanticism in African Pianism (2011)

== Publications ==
- Theoretical Issues in African Music: Exploring Resources in Creativity (Breitinger, 2003)
