= Komla Dumor =

Ghanaian journalist (1972–2014)

- Born: Komla Afeke Dumor; 3 October 1972; Accra, Ghana
- Died: 18 January 2014 (aged 41); Mill End, Rickmansworth, England
- Education: University of Ghana; Harvard University
- Occupation: Journalist
- Notable credits: Joy FM Super Morning Show (c.2000–2006); BBC Network Africa (2006–2011); BBC World News; Africa Business Report; The World Today; Focus on Africa; GMT; Global
- Spouse: Kwansema Dumor (m. 2001)
- Children: 3
- Relatives: Mawuena Trebarh (sister); Philip Gbeho (grandfather); James Victor Gbeho (uncle)

Komla Afeke Dumor (3 October 1972 – 18 January 2014) was a Ghanaian journalist who worked for BBC World News and was the main presenter of its programme Focus on Africa.

== Early life and education ==
Dumor was born in Accra, Ghana. His father, Ernest Dumor, was a professor of sociology and his mother, Cecelia Dumor, had a master's degree in Mass Communication. His grandfather was Philip Gbeho, composer of the music of Ghanaian national anthem, and his uncle, James Victor Gbeho, is a leading Ghanaian diplomat. Dumor initially studied pre-clinical medicine at the University of Jos, Nigeria, but left for his home country where he started as a medical student at the University of Ghana but later graduated with a BSc. in Sociology and Psychology, and from Harvard University's John F. Kennedy School of Government with a Master's of Public Administration.

His sister was Mawuena Trebarh, former Chief Executive Officer of the Ghana Investment Promotion Centre (GIPC) and his brother is Dr. Korshie Dumor, a medical doctor based in the United States.

== Broadcast career ==
Dumor started as the morning show host for Joy FM in Accra, Ghana. In 2003, he was awarded Journalist of the Year given by the Ghana Journalists Association.

In 2006, Dumor joined the BBC African Service in London as host of the radio programme Network Africa. From 2008 to 2012 he presented The World Today on the BBC World Service. In 2011 Dumor began presenting the World News and Africa Business Report on BBC World News and early mornings on BBC One and the BBC News Channel. When the latter was relaunched in 2013, fellow BBC correspondent Lerato Mbele was chosen as host.

In December 2013, he was named as one of the 100 most influential Africans of 2013 by New African magazine, with the citation: "It has been a coming of age for Kumla Dumor this year. The presenter of Focus on Africa, the BBC's flagship and first-ever dedicated daily TV news programme in English for African audiences, broadcast on BBC World News, has established himself as one of the emerging African faces of global broadcasting. As a lead presenter for BBC World, Dumor has considerable influence on how the continent is covered."

At the time of his death, Dumor was the only West African newsreader on BBC World News. In the words of BBC Radio 4 Today and BBC News presenter Mishal Husain, "Komla developed his own unique on air style, seamlessly moved between TV and radio and influenced Africa coverage across the BBC." He was also described by Peter Horrocks, the BBC's global news director, as "a leading light of African journalism – committed to telling the story of Africa as it really is."

He conducted interviews with a wide range of high-profile figures, including Kofi Annan, Bill Gates and Chimamanda Ngozi Adichie, and the many important news stories that he anchored included the 2010 World Cup in South Africa, President Barack Obama's trip to Africa, and the funeral of Nelson Mandela.

== Personal life ==
In 2001, Dumor married Kwansema, née Quansah, with whom he had three children: Elinam, Elorm and Emefa. He was Ewe Ghanaian and his widow, Kwansema, is Fante Ghanaian.

== Death ==
Dumor died from a heart attack on 18 January 2014 at his home in Rickmansworth, having been on air the day before. President of Ghana John Mahama said in a message on Twitter that Dumor was one of Ghana's "finest ambassadors" and "was a broadcaster of exceptional quality and Ghana's gift to the World."

On 3 February 2014, Komla Dumor's body was flown back to Ghana, where it was received at Accra International Airport by a group of family members, friends, government officials, sympathizers and members of the Aflao traditional council, who also performed some traditional rites, since Aflao was his hometown. Funeral ceremonies for Dumor were held from 21 to 23 February 2014 in Accra.

== Legacy ==
- The Association for International Broadcasting (AIB) presented a special posthumous Founders Award to Dumor's family in November 2014.
- At the 2014 African Achievers Awards Dumor was honoured with a posthumous award for Excellence in Broadcasting.
- Honouring Dumor's legacy, in 2015, the BBC launched the BBC World News Komla Dumor Award, presented each year "to an outstanding individual living and working in Africa, who combines strong journalism skills, on air flair, and an exceptional talent in telling African stories with the ambition and potential to become a star of the future." The award was presented to Ugandan journalist Nancy Kacungira in 2015, Nigerian journalist Didi Akinyelure in 2016, Nigerian journalist Amina Yuguda in 2017, Kenyan journalist Wahiga Mwaura in 2018, Ugandan journalist Solomon Serwanjja in 2019, and in 2020 Kenya's Citizen TV news anchor Victoria Rubadiri. The winner is given a three-month training and development contract in BBC News.
- In February 2020, two books were launched by the Komla Dumor Memorial Foundation to honour him: The Dreamer, Komla Dumor the Boss Player in His own words and Komla Dumor in His Element, authored by his brother, Dr Korshie Dumor, and his father, Professor Ernest Dumor.
