= Robin Wight =

Robin Wight may refer to:

- Robin Wight (advertiser), British advertising executive and charity administrator
- Robin Wight (artist) (born 1960), English artist and sculptor

== See also ==
- Robin White (disambiguation)
