= Capital TV (Nigeria) =

Nigerian television channel

- Country: Nigeria
- Broadcast area: Africa
- Headquarters: Port Harcourt, Rivers State, Nigeria

Programming
- Language: English

Ownership
- Owner: Ndume Green (Chief Executive Officer)

History
- Launched: 2022

Links
- Website: capitaltvnigeria.com

Capital TV is a Nigerian independent 24-hour news and media television channel based in Port Harcourt, Nigeria. The TV station was founded in 2019 and began broadcasting in 2022. Its primary focus is producing news and current affairs programs on Nigerian domestic issues.

== History ==
Capital TV was founded in 2022 as a private television station by Nigerian broadcaster and entrepreneur Ndume Green, who was a finalist at the 2018 Komla Dumor Award. The company commenced operations in Port Harcourt, Nigeria with subsidiaries such as LightBox studios, Ogonitv, and Wakanda Media Foundation. The corporate office was opened in Port Harcourt in September 2023. The channel was licensed in 2019 but began operations in 2022. One of the subsidiaries, OgoniTV was started in 2016 by Ndume Green and Ken Saro-Wiwa Jr.
