= Komla Dumor Award =

Young African continent Journalist of the Year Award

- Awarded for: Outstanding individuals living and working in Africa, with strong journalism skills, on-air flair, and an exceptional talent in telling African stories.
- Country: United Kingdom
- Presented by: BBC News
- Reward: Training at BBC News
- First award: 2015; 11 years ago
- Currently held by: Godwin Asediba (2025)

The Komla Dumor Award is a journalism award launched by the BBC in 2015 in honour of the legacy of Ghanaian journalist Komla Dumor who worked for BBC World News and was the main presenter of its programme Focus on Africa.

== Award details ==
The award is presented each year "to an outstanding individual living and working in Africa, who combines strong journalism skills, on air flair, and an exceptional talent in telling African stories with the ambition and potential to become a star of the future." It was founded in 2015 by Emily Kasriel who then also directed the award for its first 8 years. The winner is given a three-month training and development contract in BBC News.

== Winners ==
Year	Winner	Country	Role	Program(s)	Channel
2015	Nancy Kacungira	Uganda	Presenter	Focus on Africa; Business Today; World News Today; BBC World News; BBC News; In Business Africa; Outside Source; The World Today with Nancy Kacungira; The Context; BBC Weekend News	BBC One; BBC World News; BBC News Channel; BBC Four; BBC World Service
2016	Didi Akinyelure	Nigeria	Producer and editor	BBC News at Ten; BBC Focus on Africa; BBC Business Daily; BBC Newsday	BBC One; BBC News Channel; BBC World News; BBC World Service; BBC Radio 4
2017	Amina Yuguda	Nigeria	Host	BBC News at Six; BBC News at Ten; BBC Africa Debate	BBC One; BBC News Channel
2018	Waihiga Mwaura	Kenya	Presenter	Various	Citizen TV
2019	Solomon Serwanjja	Uganda	Reporter and anchor	Various	NBS TV
2020	Victoria Rubadiri	Kenya	Reporter and anchor	SundayLive; Citizen Weekend	Citizen TV
2021	No award				
2022	Dingindaba Jonah Buyoya	Zambia	Presenter	Various	Diamond TV Zambia
2023	Paa Kwesi Asare	Ghana	Presenter	Various	*TV3 Ghana: BBC News
2024	Rukia Bulle	Kenya	Reporter	Various	NTV
2025	Godwin Asediba	Ghana	Reporter, Filmmaker and News Anchor	Various	TV3 Ghana; 3 FM
