= India Business Report =

- New titles used as of January 2013
- Created by: BBC World News
- Presented by: Yogita Limaye; Shilpa Kannan; Sameer Hashmi
- Country of origin: India
- Original language: English

Production
- Production locations: Mumbai (primarily), with shots from various locations
- Editor: Simon Atkinson
- Running time: 23 minutes

Original release
- Network: BBC World News
- Release: 2011 – April 3, 2016

Related
- World Business Report; Middle East Business Report; Africa Business Report; Asia Business Report; Business Edition

India Business Report was a weekly business news programme produced by the BBC and shown on BBC World News, presented by Yogita Limaye. The last episode of this programme aired on 3 April 2016.

== Presenters ==
| Name | Role |
|---|---|
| Yogita Limaye | Main Presenter |
| Shilpa Kannan | Relief Presenters |
| Sameer Hashmi | Relief Presenters |

=== Former presenters ===
- Karishma Vaswani
- Rajini Vaidyanathan (Relief Presenter)
- Nidhi Dutt
- Delnaaz Irani

== Schedule ==
| Day | Time (GMT - London) | Time (UTC+05:30 - Mumbai) |
|---|---|---|
| Sunday | 05:30 | 11:00 |
| Sunday | 16:30 (except for Europe) | 22:00 (except for Europe) |
