= National Symphony Orchestra Ghana =

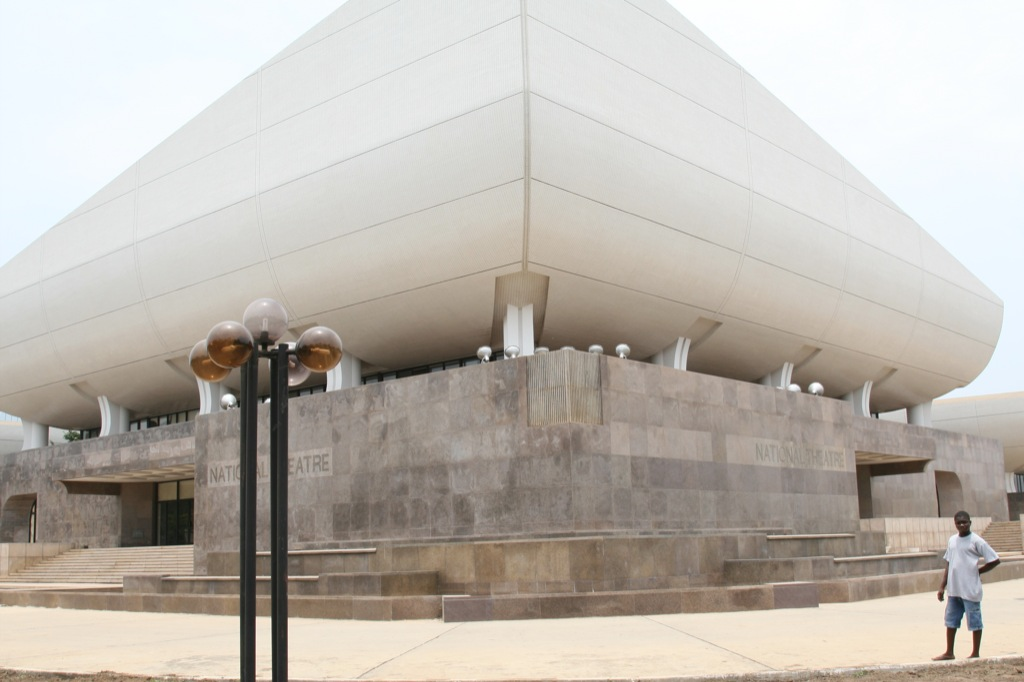
The National Theatre in Accra, Ghana, where the National Symphony Orchestra Ghana regularly performs

The National Symphony Orchestra Ghana (NSO Ghana) is the national symphony orchestra of Ghana. NSO Ghana was founded in 1959 by order of Kwame Nkrumah, and established by Philip Gbeho (who had composed the Ghanaian national anthem in 1957), together with the musician Amihud (Ami) Elroy from Israel who was especially invited to Ghana for the three years establishment mission. NSO Ghana was the only classical symphony orchestra in sub-Saharan Africa outside of South Africa until Orchestre Symphonique Kimbanguiste was created in Congo in 1994.

The orchestra is based in Accra, the nation's capital, and is a government organization, with its own administration under the control of the National Commission on Culture. NSO Ghana . It performs regularly at the National Theatre in Accra.

== Conductor ==
Since 2005, the orchestra has been conducted by Isaac Annoh, who serves as the orchestra's music director. Former conductors include Philip Gbeho, Amihud Elroy, Geoffery Boateng, Dinah Reindorf, Nana Danso Abiam, Kenn Kafui, Emmanuel Gyimah Labi, Akosua Obuo Addo, George Dorf, Oscar Sulley, Kweku Acquaah-Harrison and Lahnor Adjartey Adjei.

== Profile ==
The orchestra comprises 46 musicians, of which 32 are full-time and 14 are part-time. In the past, the instrumentation has been as high as 47.

The instrumentation includes 3 flutes, 1 oboe, 2 clarinets, 1 bassoon, 2 trumpets, 2 trombones, 2 horns, 1 tuba, 5 drummers and percussionists (including traditional African drums, bells, and rattles), 8 violin I, 6 violin II, 5 violas, 5 cellos, and 3 double basses.

The orchestra sometimes performs with a choir.

== Performances ==
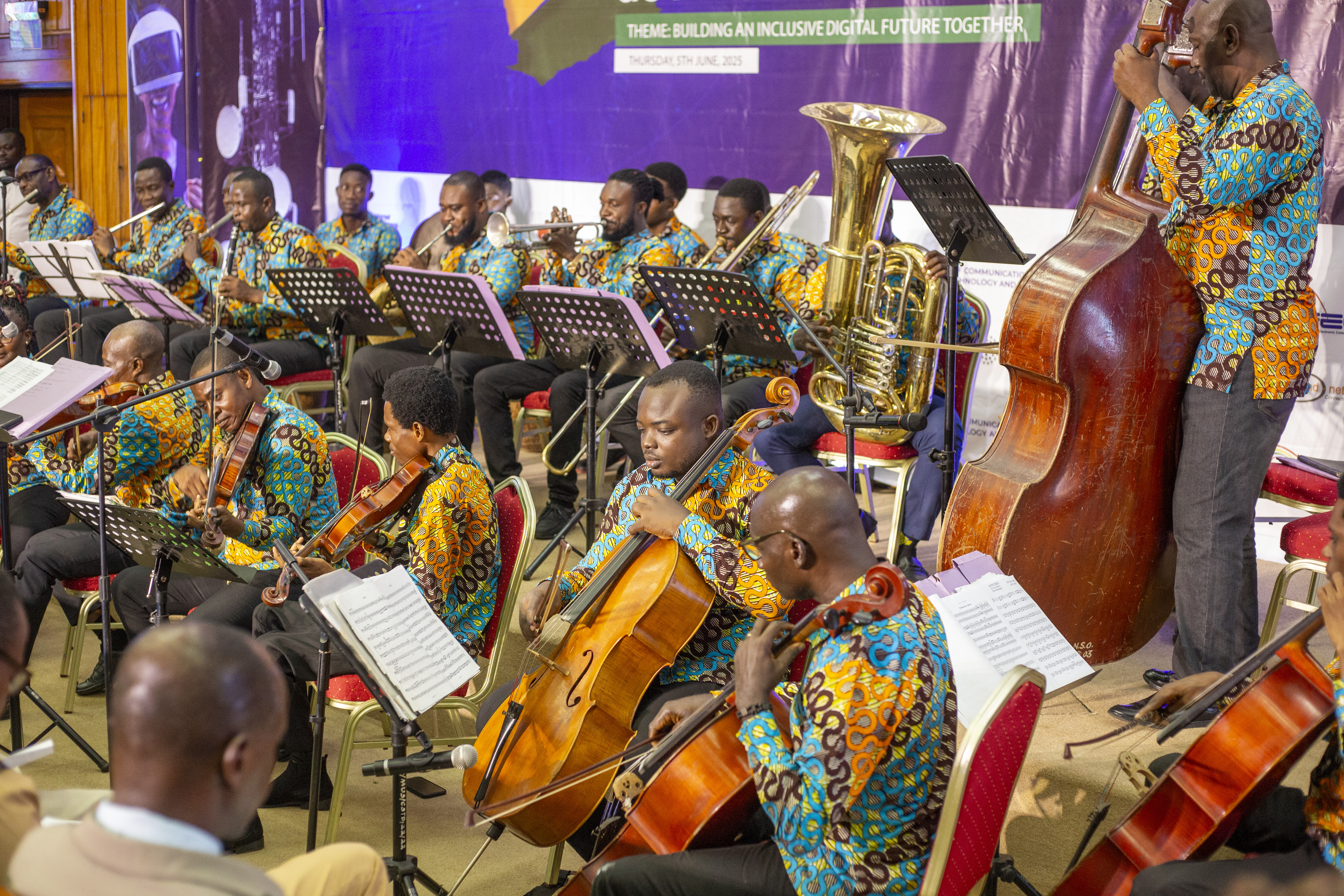
National Symphony Orchestra performing

The National Symphony Orchestra Ghana has performed at such state functions such as Emancipation Day and visits of foreign dignitaries such as Queen Elizabeth II, Thabo Mbeki, and the Sultan of Brunei.

The orchestra has also performed at the National Festival of Arts and Culture (NAFAC), PANAFEST, and Septemberfest, as well as at various fundraising programs. Additionally, it performs at schools, hotels, weddings, and funerals, as well as at Easter and Christmas concerts.

Since 1996, the orchestra has presented an African Composer's Series, in which it performs the works of composers from Ghana and other African nations.
