= Rico Hizon =

Filipino journalist (born 1966)

- Born: Federico Morales Hizon; March 24, 1966 (age 60); Philippines
- Education: De La Salle University
- Occupations: Broadcast journalist, business news presenter
- Notable credit(s): GMA Network; CNBC Asia; BBC News; BBC World News; Newsday; Asia Business Report; World Business Report; CNN Philippines; ABS-CBN News Channel; The Final Word with Rico Hizon; The Exchange with Rico Hizon

Federico "Rico" Morales Hizon (English: /riːkoʊ ˈhiːzɒn/; Tagalog: [ɾiˈkɔ ˈhisɔn]; born March 24, 1966), is a Filipino broadcast journalist. He is currently the Senior Vice President for Corporate Relations of SM Investment Corp. since May 6, 2024.

Hizon previously worked at BBC World News, anchoring Newsday and Asia Business Report, CNBC Asia, and CNN Philippines. He was the first Filipino anchor for both news networks.

== Education ==
After gaining a degree in Communication Arts and Business at De La Salle University, Hizon taught radio, Television and Broadcasting courses at the university. He also has a Doctorate Degree in Humanities, Honoris Causa, from the University of Northeastern Philippines.

== Career ==
Prior to becoming a journalist, Hizon began working at the age of 16 for McDonald's at its first Philippines branch in Manila, where he was part of its inaugural crew, and later at another branch in Greenhills, San Juan.

=== GMA Network ===
Hizon started his broadcast career at Manila-based GMA Network, from 1988 to 1995, where he was responsible for covering capital markets, banking and finance, real estate, investment and corporate developments. He anchored the daily business program, Business Today, GMA News Live and Stock Market Live from the trading floor of the Philippine Stock Exchange. During his tenure, Hizon won "The Outstanding Young Men for Broadcast Journalism" award.

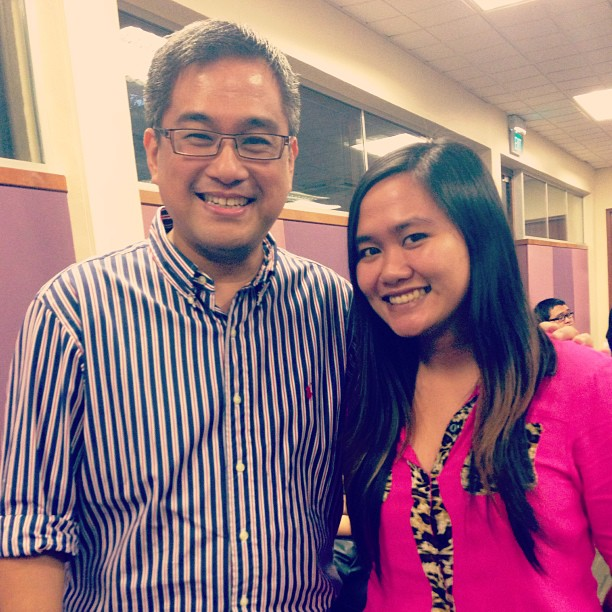
Rico Hizon with entrepreneur and investor Jonha Richman

=== CNBC Asia ===
Hizon then joined CNBC Asia in April 1995, based in Hong Kong and later in Singapore, where he was the main anchor of the morning edition of CNBC Today, Squawk Box, Market Watch and Power Lunch.

=== BBC ===
Hizon joined BBC World News in 2002, and anchored the daily business and finance programme Asia Business Report and Asia Today live from Singapore Monday to Friday. Since June 2011 Hizon has co-presented Newsday, a news bulletin programme on the BBC from Singapore with Babita Sharma and Kasia Madera in London. He was also a regular on World Business Report as an Asian business correspondent. In November 2013 Rico presented Newsday live from Tacloban, Philippines following Typhoon Haiyan. In January 2014, Hizon co-presented the BBC Newsday programme from New Broadcasting House, London with Babita Sharma in Singapore for a short while.

In September 2018, Hizon once again presented from the London newsroom, with Sharanjit Leyl taking over presenting duties in Singapore. It was announced that this was only for a single week, with Hizon returning to Singapore for the next week. In March 2020, Hizon formally announced via his Instagram account that he would be leaving BBC News after 17 years.

=== CNN Philippines ===
A few weeks later, it was reported that Hizon would return to the Philippines and join CNN Philippines as senior anchor and director for news content development. The memo sent out by CNN Philippines president Armie Jarin-Bennett says Hizon will take over the 9 PM newscast. He also announced his move to the network on his Twitter account.

By April 2020, Hizon solidified his presence as a trusted source of news in his native Philippines through his late-night newscast The Final Word, as well as anchoring CNN Philippines's newest business show, The Exchange, which launched in July. Hizon was also part of the network's State of the Nation Address coverage that same month - his first SONA coverage in the Philippines since 1995. He anchored a cumulative 7 hours that day - starting with the network's 2pm coverage where he joined Chief Correspondent and Anchor Pia Hontiveros and Senior Anchor and Correspondent Pinky Webb until the President's speech ended and for a post-SONA analysis with ADR Stratbase analyst Dindo Manhit and former Presidential Spokesperson Edwin Lacierda.

During his tenure, he won several awards including his program The Final Word by the Asian Academy Creative Awards on 2020 & 2023 and the 28th Asian Television Awards in Ho Chi Minh City, Vietnam last January 2024.

=== Post-CNN Philippines and ABS-CBN News Channel ===
Following the closure of CNN Philippines on 2024, Hizon made an appearance on NET 25's Kada Umaga. In May 2024, Hizon became the editor-in-chief of the news media website GoodNewsPilipinas.com. In September, Hizon became SM Investments's senior vice president for corporate relations and the host of YouTube vlog SM in Focus.

On October 29, 2024, Hizon joined ABS-CBN News Channel with his new business talkshow Beyond the Exchange, premiered on November 5. He also guested as an entertainment host on ABS-CBN's flagship news program TV Patrol on November 4, 2024.

== Legal issues ==
In 2024, a court in Angeles City ordered the arrest of Hizon and his sisters Maria Belen and Bernadette after their eldest brother Ernesto filed a case against them for fraud relating an inheritance dispute. The three posted bail of P120,000 each.

== Bibliography ==
Contributor in Books and Other Publications

- My BenCab: Collectors Tell Their Stories (2018) (edited by Thelma Sioson San Juan)

== Awards and recognitions ==
- People Asia Magazine "Men Who Matter" Awardee (2016)
- 2014 Asian Television Awards - Best News Anchor (2014)
- Doctorate Degree in Humanities, Honoris Causa by the University of Northeastern Philippines and the Commission on Higher Education (2012)
- 2012 Broadcast Journalist of the Year, Rotary Club of Manila
- People of the Year Award from People Asia Magazine (2010)
- La Sallian Achievement Award for Global Journalism (2009)
- Pamana ng Pilipino Presidential Award received from President Gloria Macapagal Arroyo at Malacañang Palace for excellence in International Journalism, and gave the response on behalf of his fellow awardees. (2008)
- The Bank of the Philippine Islands recognized Hizon for bringing honor and recognition to the Philippines with the 2008 BPinoy Award, and for advocating important Filipino values and principles, Rico received the first ever Yes The Filipino Can! Award. (2008)
- December 2006, The Outstanding Young Men Award for International Journalism and Community Service.
- 2021, Best News Presenter or Anchor, The Final Word with Rico Hizon, 26th Asian Television Awards (Nominated)
