= Mariko Oi =

Japanese journalist

- 大井真理子
- Born: 14 December 1981 (age 44); Setagaya, Tokyo, Japan
- Education: RMIT University
- Years active: 2005–present
- Employer: BBC World News
- Spouse: Skye Neal
- Children: 3

Mariko Oi (大井 真理子, Ōi Mariko; born 14 December 1981) is a Japanese bilingual journalist based in Singapore, who has worked for the BBC since 2006, when she became the network's first Japanese reporter.

She hosts the BBC World Service's visualised podcast, Asia Specific, which delivers in-depth analysis and expertise on stories from across Asia-Pacific on Wednesdays and Saturdays on YouTube, BBC Sounds, Spotify and Apple Podcasts.

Previously, Oi regularly presented Newsday and Business Today (formerly Asia Business Report) on BBC News Channel and business segments on BBC Radio 4 and BBC World Service. She spent 2021 as the BBC's Asia Business correspondent. Oi also worked as the network’s Tokyo correspondent in 2012 and North America Business correspondent in 2013 and 2016.

== Early life and education ==
Oi is from the Setagaya ward of Tokyo. Her father works in transport.

She attended the Sacred Heart School in Tokyo and then studied abroad at Presbyterian Ladies' College, Melbourne where she lived with a host family and learned English. Interested in history, she wrote an article in 2013 criticising the Japanese education system for sanitising its imperial history. She began her studies at Keio University before transferring to RMIT University in Australia, graduating with a Bachelor of Communications in Journalism in 2004. She participated in RMITV and interned with the ABC during university.

== Career ==
Oi began her career with brief stints as an intern at Reuters in New York and an Asia Pacific producer for Bloomberg Television stationed from Tokyo. She moved to Singapore in 2006 when she joined the BBC.

Oi has covered major breaking news in Asia-Pacific region, such as Akihabara massacre in June 2008, Great East Japan earthquake and tsunami and the subsequent Fukushima nuclear disaster in March 2011, then-American President Barack Obama's visit to Hiroshima in August 2016, North Korea-United States Summit in Singapore in June 2018, Japanese imperial transition in 2019, 2019–2020 Hong Kong protests, 2019 Rugby World Cup in Japan, COVID-19 pandemic in 2020 and 2021, postponed-2020 Tokyo Summer Olympic Games, assassination of former Japanese Prime Minister Shinzo Abe in July 2022, Japanese slush fund scandal and British Post Office scandal in 2023, the global market sell-off triggered by Japan ending its zero interest-rate policy in 2024, and President Trump's 'Liberation Day' and the 2025 stock market crash.

In 2013 and 2016, Oi spent six months in New York City as a business correspondent where she reported from New York Stock Exchange. She also spent six months in London in 2014, presenting news bulletins and reporting on major stories for BBC News Channel and BBC World News. Oi has hosted the documentary Missing Histories: China and Japan for the BBC's Freedom Season. While in Japan in 2015, she appeared on Working Lives to discuss Shinzo Abe's policies, the debate programme Talking Business, and the economics series Jump Starting Japan.

== Accolades ==
Oi was nominated for the Nikkei Woman of the Year award in 2009. She was recognised by Newsweek Japan as one of the most respected Japanese nationals in 2023.

== Personal ==
Oi is married to Skye Neal, who works in the Sentosa Golf Club as a golf coach.
