= Rukia Bulle =

Kenyan reporter

- Citizenship: Kenyan
- Education: United States IS
- Occupation: Reporter
- Awards: Komla Dumor Award

Rukia Bulle is a Kenyan reporter with NTV Kenya. In 2024, she won the 2024 BBC World News Komla Dumor Award.

== Career ==
Bulle holds a bachelor's degree in journalism from the United States International University (USIU). She is currently pursuing a master's degree in International Relations at this same university.
