= Audrey Brown (journalist) =

South African broadcast journalist

- Born: Kliptown, Soweto, South Africa
- Citizenship: South African
- Education: Rhodes University; University of Wales
- Occupation: Broadcast journalist
- Employer: Commonwealth Foundation
- Known for: BBC Focus on Africa radio

Audrey Brown is a South African broadcast journalist who worked at the BBC World Service.

== Early life and education ==
Brown was born in Kliptown, a suburb of Soweto. She could smell the distant teargas on the day of the Soweto uprising, when she was eight or nine years old, and grew up in a family who were involved in the struggle against apartheid. She has a degree in journalism, African history and politics from Rhodes University and a master's degree in journalism from University of Wales, and has studied film criticism and documentary film making at the Ateliers Varan in Paris.

== Career ==
In the late 1980s and early 1990s, Brown worked on South African newspapers Vrye Weekblad and Weekly Mail. Early in her career, she interviewed Nelson Mandela on Robben Island.

Brown regularly hosted the BBC World Service's Focus on Africa radio programme and podcast, and has presented BBC Radio 4's Pick of the Week.

She was one of the judges for the 2020 Caine Prize, awarded for a short story by an African writer.

Brown was one of the women featured in the book 200 Women: Who will change the way you see the world by Geoff Blackwell and Ruth Hobday (2017, Chronicle Books: ISBN 9781452166582).

In December 2025, Brown announced on X that she would be leaving the BBC to join the Commonwealth Foundation in March 2026.
