= Nuala McGovern =

Irish broadcast journalist

- Born: Dublin, Ireland
- Education: University College Dublin
- Occupations: Journalist, presenter
- Notable credit(s): Newsday, Outside Source, Woman's Hour
- Spouse: Tristan Agates

Nuala McGovern is an Irish journalist and broadcaster working for the BBC. McGovern was the main presenter of Outside Source on the BBC World Service from 2014 to 2022. She presents Woman's Hour on BBC Radio 4 from Monday to Wednesday.

== Early life and education ==
McGovern grew up in Drumcondra in Dublin, Ireland. Her father was Jim McGovern, a publican from Aughavas in County Leitrim. She is a graduate of University College Dublin, where she studied English and Italian.

== Early career ==
After graduating from university she taught English in Italy for a period before moving to the United States after her sister made an application for a green card on her behalf. She got her start in broadcasting as a presenter and producer for Adrian Flannelly's radio show in New York, before joining WNYC. There, McGovern was a producer on The Brian Lehrer Show for nine years, where she was part of a Peabody Award-winning team. During this time she was also the founding producer of a spin-off show, Brian Lehrer Live: Where Web Video Meets the Issues.

== BBC career ==
McGovern joined the BBC in 2009 as a presenter and producer of World: Have Your Say on the BBC World Service. In 2012 she became one of the founding presenters of Newsday, the World Service's new breakfast programme. She started presenting OS in 2015.

McGovern announced on Twitter on 13 January 2022 that she would leave OS to become a news presenter on BBC World News.

In April 2024, she took over as host of BBC Radio 4's Woman's Hour. She presents the programme on Mondays, Tuesdays and Wednesdays.
