= Newsday (radio programme) =

BBC radio programme

- Genre: News, current events, and factual
- Running time: Weekdays 05:00–08:00 GMT (Online only: 03:00–05:00 GMT)
- Country of origin: United Kingdom; South Africa
- Language: English
- Home station: BBC World Service; BBC Radio 4 BBC Live News
- Hosted by: Lawrence Pollard; Lerato Mbele; Andrew Peach; Julian Keane; Bola Mosuro; Nuala McGovern; Alan Kasujja
- Recording studio: Broadcasting House; BBC Johannesburg
- Original release: 23 July 2012
- Website: https://www.bbc.co.uk/programmes/p00w940j

Newsday is BBC World Service's international hard news and current affairs programme. It acts as an afternoon programme for Asia, a breakfast broadcast in Europe and the UK and an overnight news programme for the Americas. It premiered on 23 July 2012. It replaced The World Today and Network Africa, the programme that had a particular focus on Africa. It was expected at its launch that Newsday would have one of the largest audiences - if not the largest - of any radio programme in the world.

== History ==
Newsday was launched on 23 July 2012, replacing The World Today and Network Africa. For the first three weeks, the programme was broadcast from the 2012 Summer Olympics held in London. During its first six weeks, it featured interviews with Liberian President Ellen Johnson Sirleaf, Kenyan Prime Minister Raila Odinga, Malawian President Joyce Banda, African Development Bank President Donald Kaberuka, and former President of the African National Congress Youth League Julius Malema.

In May 2017, the 05:00 GMT edition became a dedicated broadcast featuring news for and from Africa. It is broadcast exclusively on African partner stations. An additional edition of The Newsroom and a replay of a selected programme features on the main BBC World Service network during this time.

== Social media ==
Newsday invites listeners to comment on issues covered in the programme on social media. On Twitter, it uses the hashtag #BBCNewsday and tweets from the @bbcworldservice and @BBCAfrica Twitter profiles. On Facebook, it posts on the BBC World Service and BBC Africa pages. Newsday uses these social media profiles Mon-Fri, 21:00–09:00.

== See also ==
- BBC World Service, the home of Newsday
- BBC News
- Newsday (TV programme), Newsday's sister programme on TV
