= Jonah Buyoya =

Zambian journalist

Dingindaba Jonah Buyoya
- Born: February 7, 1997 (age 29); Choma, Zambia
- Occupation: Journalism
- Years active: 2014 - Present
- Known for: Journalism
- Television: Diamond TV Zambia
- Awards: Komla Dumor Award (2022)

Dingindaba Jonah Buyoya (born 7 February 1997) is a Zambian journalist, television and radio presenter, and investigative reporter. He works with BBC Africa Service based in Nairobi, Kenya. He worked at Diamond Television (Diamond TV) in Lusaka until 30th November, 2025. He is best known internationally for winning the BBC News Komla Dumor Award in 2022. He has produced broadcast investigations and documentaries on governance, road safety and democracy in Southern Africa.

== Early life and education ==
Buyoya was born in Choma, Southern Province, to Stanley and Violet Buyoya. He began his early childhood education at Habuce Private School before moving to Kabwe, where he completed Grades 1 to 7. Following the death of his father in 2008, his family relocated to Mazabuka, where he pursued his secondary education at St Edmunds’ Secondary School. He is the youngest of six siblings.

After completing his secondary education, Buyoya went on to pursue tertiary studies at Cavendish University and the Zambian Open University, while beginning his career in broadcasting.

== Career ==
Buyoya began presenting on Zambian television in the mid-2010s and rose to prominence as a news anchor and programme host at Diamond TV, one of Zambia’s leading private broadcasters. He has hosted current-affairs programmes, lifestyle shows and entertainment formats, while also working across radio and television. In addition to on-air work, he has served in management positions at Diamond TV, first as Productions Manager and later as Senior Manager responsible for content and administration.

He has also contributed to international outlets, including the BBC, where he has bylines as a journalist. His investigative reporting has included work on corruption in the Road Transport and Safety Agency (RTSA) and multi-part documentaries on democracy in Southern Africa.

== Awards and recognition ==
In 2017, Buyoya won the MISA Zambia Best TV Presenter Award. He was a finalist for the PG Zambia Young Zambian Journalist of the Year Award, and later nominated for the One Young World Journalist of the Year Award.

He has also received the MISA Zambia Golden TV Award for excellence in broadcasting. His most high-profile accolade to date is the 2022 BBC News Komla Dumor Award, which recognises outstanding African journalists who demonstrate strong storytelling and on-air presence.
