= Africa Business Report =

2009 BBC business news programme

- Final titles used from 6 October 2013 – 25 May 2018
- Created by: BBC World News
- Presented by: Lerato Mbele (since 2013 relaunch); Tomi Oladipo
- Country of origin: South Africa
- Original language: English

Production
- Production location: Johannesburg (primarily) with shots from other locations
- Running time: 20 minutes

Original release
- Network: BBC World News; BBC News
- Release: February 2, 2009 – 25 May 2018

Related
- World Business Report; Middle East Business Report; India Business Report; Asia Business Report; Business Edition; Focus on Africa; In Business Africa

Africa Business Report is a business news programme produced by BBC News and is shown on BBC World News. This programme was launched on 2 February 2009 as a monthly half-hour programme presented by Komla Dumor. Following a hiatus on 1 August 2011, the programme was relaunched on 6 October 2013 and is now aired worldwide as a weekly 20-minute programme. The program aired its final episode on 25 May 2018. The programme, which uses correspondents located throughout the continent, is described by BBC World News as:

"A look at business across the continent. We talk to the people and businesses who are changing the economic face of Africa. BBC correspondents within each country will report on the growing trends and latest business developments and give an insight into this diverse continent."

The newly launched programme is now hosted by Lerato Mbele, whereas previous host Komla Dumor was then host of Focus on Africa.

== Presenters ==
Presenter	Current role
Lerato Mbele	Main Presenter
