= Seanice Kacungira =

Ugandan journalist

- Other name: Seanice Lojede
- Citizenship: Uganda
- Occupations: Journalist and radio personality
- Organization: Blu famingo- a digital media management company.
- Notable work: Former broadcaster at capital FM, Sanyu FM, WBs and NTV.
- Spouse: Fabian Adeoye Lojede
- Children: 2
- Family: Nancy Kacungira
- Awards: Names of the Africa's most influential women in business and Governance

Seanice Kacungira is a Ugandan journalist and radio personality.

== Career ==
Former broadcaster Seanice Kacungira is a name that is recognized across Tanzanian (Clouds and East Africa FM) Kenyan (Capital FM) and Ugandan Media (Sanyu FM, WBS and NTV). She was named one of Africa's Most Influential Women in Business, Seanice is a leader, strategist, and entrepreneur with a career spanning media, digital marketing, and tech innovation. Starting her professional journey as a radio presenter working in Tanzania, Uganda and Kenya. Over the years, Seanice transitioned into the business world, co – founding BLU Flamingo Africa, a tech led integrated marketing company.

She worked for Kenyan (Capital FM) and Ugandan Media (Sanyu FM, WBS and NTV).

Seanice and her younger sister Nancy Kacungira together co-founded Blu Flamingo, a digital media management company.

== Awards ==
She was recognized as one of Africa's Most Influential Women in Business and Government.

Named Africa's Most Influential Woman in Business SADC region, by CEO Global, South Africa.

Seanice was awarded in the category of Business and Professional Services. The awards are the leading African recognition programme honoring excellence in the private and public sector. The programme covers 23 economic sectors and has for the past nineteen years independently recognized those leaders who are at the pinnacle of their industry.

== Personal life ==
She is married to Fabian Adeoye Lojede and a mother of two. She later changed her name to Seanice Lojede after her marriage.
