= Waihiga Mwaura =

Kenyan journalist

Waihiga Mwaura (born 6 June 1984) is a Kenyan journalist and BBC News presenter. He has presented the BBC News Focus on Africa programme since 2023. He won the 2018 BBC World News Komla Dumor Award. Mwaura has previously served in various capacities on Citizen TV.

== Early life and education ==
Mwaura was born on 6 June 1984 to parents who are both lawyers. He has two siblings. His family lived in Donholm and then the Westlands neighbourhood of Nairobi.

He has a bachelor's degree in computer science from the African Nazarene University, and a master's degree in communications (Media Studies).

== Career ==
After graduation, Mwaura took an internship at a non-governmental organisation and worked briefly at a bank. His journalism career started in 2008 when he was employed as an intern on the Business Desk of Nation Media Group. He joined Citizen TV's producers Royal Media Services in 2009 where he worked as a producer, and as presenter on the Power Breakfast Show and on Citizen Weekend, as well as presenting the Zinduka show. He won the CNN's African Journalist Award, Sport Award in 2012, and in 2015, he won the Mohammed Amin Africa award. He later took on news presenting at Citizen TV. In 2018, he won the BBC World News Komla Dumor Award.

== Personal life ==
Mwaura is married to gospel singer Joyce Omondi. His younger sister Gathoni Mwaura died in 2022.

He is a Christian and worked as a master of ceremonies at his local church.

His father, David Mwaure Waihiga, unsuccessfully ran for President of Kenya in the 2022 Kenyan general election.
