= Ephraim Amu =

Ghanaian composer, musicologist, and teacher

Ephraim Kɔku Amu
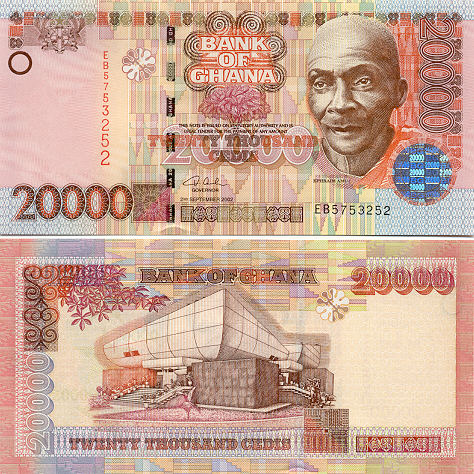
- Ephraim Amu on a 2002 20000 Cedis banknote
- Born: 13 September 1899; Peki, Gold Coast (now Ghana)
- Died: 2 January 1995 (aged 95); Ghana
- Education: Abetifi Teachers' Seminary
- Occupations: Ethnomusicologist and composer

Ephraim Kɔku Amu (13 September 1899 – 2 January 1995) was a Ghanaian composer, musicologist and teacher. He was a mentor to the musicologist J. H. Kwabena Nketia.

== Biography ==
=== Early life and education ===
He was born on 13 September 1899 at Peki-Avetile (also called Abenase), in the Peki Traditional Area of the Volta Region of Ghana and as a male child born on a Wednesday was called Kɔku. His father was Stephen Amuyaa, a wood carver who was popularly called Papa Stefano. His mother was Sarah Akoram Ama.

Ephraim Kɔku Amu was baptised by the Rev. Rudolf Mallet on 22 October 1899.

Amu first went to school in May 1906 and at about age 12 he entered the Peki-Blengo E.P. Boarding Middle School, where he showed much interest and love for music and agriculture. According to him, he enjoyed the music played during church collections when the music teacher, Mr Karl Theodore Ntem, played soul-moving renditions on the organ. Amu and his music teacher struck a mutual agreement whereby Amu requested to be taught the skills of organ playing and in return Mr Ntem asked him to work on his farm on Saturdays.

In 1915, Amu passed the standard 7 School Leaving Certificate examination and also passed the Abetifi Teachers Seminary'S Examination. In 1916 he and two other colleagues had to walk 150 miles from [Peki] to [Abetifi] with their boxes on their heads to start teacher training education. On their journey, they had to rest at several points, including Koforidua, Nkawkaw, Asubone and Obomen. Amu joined 25 other newcomers at the college. While at the college, Amu realized that some of the students, including his classmates, owned steel bicycles so he set himself the task of building his own bicycle from wood, carving it from a wooden slab in the bush near the college. Students who discovered his handiwork brought it into the open and named it Amu. It is on record that even the son of the Switzerland Swiss principal, Stern, enjoyed many rides on the Amu wooden cycle. Amu also used his ingenuity and creativity to carve wooden balls for the school games, which replaced the imported balls being used at the time at the seminary. Amu completed his four-year teacher-catechist training in 1919. Newly graduating teacher-catechist, he was one of the two preachers selected to mount the pulpit on behalf of their fellow mates, as was customary to preach and to express their appreciation to their tutors and townsfolk. The sermon also served as an assessment of the quality of the theological training that had been offered to the students.

Amu chose the sermon text from Matthew 25:40 on this occasion. His theme was “the Lord will thank you for all the good you have done for his little ones”. Amu used both Twi and the Ewe language in his short sermon.

=== Work and music ===
By the time Amu completed his training, motor vehicles were more common so he could travel from Abetifi to Osino and travel by train to Koforidua, then take a motor vehicle to Frankadua. He made the remainder of the journey on foot from Frankadua to Peki, a distance of 18 miles.

From 1 January 1920, Amu took up an appointment as a teacher at Peki-Blengo E.P. Middle Boarding School, where he taught songs and was keen on making his pupils able to read music well. He went to Koforidua to buy a five-octave Henry Riley folding organ for the school. He faced the problem of carrying the organ to Peki. After successfully reaching Frankadua by motor vehicle, he had to carry the organ on his head and walk the distance all night, arriving at Peki the following morning. Eager to master his skills in music, Amu took music lessons with Rev. Allotey-Pappoe, a Methodist Minister stationed at Peki-Avetile.

Amu composed several musical pieces, among them:

1. "Fare thee well"
2. "Mawɔ dɔ na Yesu"
3. "Nkwagye Dwom"
4. "Dwonto"
5. "Yetu Osa"
6. "Israel Hene"
7. "Onipa da wo ho so"
8. "Yaanom Abibirimma"
9. "Yen Ara Asaase Ni" (Twi version of Mia denyigba lɔ̃lɔ̃ la)
10. "Mia denyigba lɔ̃lɔ̃ la" (Original Ewe Version)
11. "Adawura abo me"
12. "Samansuo"
13. "Alegbegbe Mawu Lɔ̃ Xexeame"
14. "Asem yi di ka"
15. "Akwaaba Ndwom"
16. "Mo Mma Yen Nkɔso Mforo"
17. "Enye Yen Nyame"
18. "Biako Ye"
19. "Bonwire Kente"
20. "Esrom Miele"
21. "Ko Na Kotutu"
22. "Adikanfo Mo"
23. "Mawue Na Me Mawue Ta Me"
24. "Dzɔdzɔenyɛnyɛ"
25. "Amanson Twerampon"
26. "Tiri ne nsa ne kuma"

Amu is particularly known for his use of the atenteben, a traditional Ghanaian bamboo flute; he promoted and popularized the instrument throughout the country, and composed music for it.

== African influence ==
Amu's composition "Yen Ara Asase Ni" has become a Ghanaian patriotic song that is performed at national functions.

From 1926, Amu was transferred on promotion to Presbyterian Mission Seminary at Akropong on the recommendation of the Synod Committee of the Eʋe Presbyteria Hame. At Akropong, he was seen in his actions and ideas as unorthodox. As a tutor in charge of gardening he requested students to use night soil to manure the college farm. The students found this unpleasant since it was a taboo for an educated man to carry human excreta. To prove that example was better than precept he would carry the excreta to the college farm himself ahead of the unwilling students.

Dr. Ephraim Amu employed no one to sweep his rooms, wash his plates or run errands for him. No manual work was too menial or hard for him. He believed in using African cultural artefacts and good African technological and social inventions. He preferred the title Owura to "mister" as a prefix to his name.

Dr Kɔku Ephraim Amu selected Twi names for the four new college dormitories that were completed in 1929. Upon request from Mr Ferguson, the Principal of Akropong Training college, Amu came out with a solfa and notation of the street song “Yaa Amponsa”, set to his own chaste words. His students enjoyed the new song, melody and the new words. The street ballad "Yaa Amponsa" had new clothes and was popular with great appeal and appreciation.

Amu learnt to speak correct Akuapem Twi from members of his singing band. The Akropong Church singing band specialised in Amu's type of African music during the period he led and taught the group.

In 1927, inspired by the contents of Wasu, a journal published by the West African Students' Union, Amu decided that he would wear African dress with pride. He decided not to wear warm unsuitable European clothes in tropical Africa. He made efforts to make the Christian church service more meaningful to African worshippers who were ashamed of their African clothing, language, music and even their African names.

As part of his ingenuity and creativity Amu introduced bamboo flutes - odurogyaba, odurogya and atɛtɛnbɛn.

In 1931, after Amu preached wearing his African attire on a Sunday, he was summoned to appear before the church court. The Rev. Peter Hall told Amu, "We were taken aback to see you conduct Sunday service in a native cloth. We hope you will not do this again."The Rev. Peter Hall told Amu, "We were taken aback to see you conduct Sunday service in a native cloth. We hope you will not do this again."

Amu therefore in his polite manner took leave of the church session but decided in his heart to continue to work in the church as a catechist and music teacher rather than to become a minister of the Gospel to accept wearing unsuitable European dress.

In June 1942, Amu married Beatrice Yao and presented a wooden box made of the finest wood instead of an imported steel trunk to his bride. Dr Amu married aged 43 on 3 September 1942.

On Saturday 27 March 1965, the University of Ghana conferred the honorary degree of Doctor of Music on Ephraim Kɔku Amu at the University of Ghana, Legon.

== Ephraim Amu Foundation ==
The Ephraim Amu Foundation was founded in 1995 and launched in 2004 in his honour.

== Works by Ephraim Amu ==
- Amu, Ephraim. Twenty-five African Songs in the Twi Language. Music and words by E. Amu. Sheldon Press, 1932.
- Amu, Ephraim. Amu choral works. Waterville Publishing House, 1993.
- Amu, Ephraim. How to Study African Rhythm. The Teachers' Journal (Accra) 6.2 (1933): 1933-34.

== Works about Ephraim Amu and his work ==
- Agawu, V. Kofi. The impact of language on musical composition in Ghana: An introduction to the musical style of Ephraim Amu. Ethnomusicology (1984): 37-73.
- Agawu, V. Kofi, and Ephraim Amu. "The making of a composer." The Black Perspective in Music (1987): 51-63.
- Agyemang, Fred M. Amu the African: a study in vision and courage. Asempa Publishers, Christian Council of Ghana, 1988.
- Amu, Misonu. Stylistic and Textual Sources of contemporary Ghanaian Art Music composer. A case study: Dr. Ephraim Amu. Unpublished M. Phil, thesis presented to the Institute of African Studies, Univ. of Ghana, Legon (1988).
- Atiemo, Abamfo Ofori. "'Singing with understanding': the story of gospel music in Ghana." Studies in world Christianity 12.2 (2006): 142-163.
- Beeko, Anthony Antwi. The Trail Blazers: Fruits of the Presbyterian Church of Ghana, 1828-2003. Afram Publications Ghana Limited, 2004.
- Dor, George. Uses of indigenous music genres in Ghanaian choral art music: Perspectives from the works of Amu, Blege, and Dor. Ethnomusicology (2005): 441-475.
- Flolu, James. "Music teacher education in Ghana: Training for the churches or the schools?." Sounds of Change–Social and Political Features of Music in Africa. Stockholm: SIDA (2004): 164-179.
- Nketia, JH Kwabena. The Historical and Stylistic Background of the Music of Ephraim Amu. Ephraim Amu, Amu Choral Works 1 (1963).
- Nketia, J. H. Modern trends in Ghana music. African Music (1957): 13-17.
- Oehrle, Elizabeth. Emerging music education trends in Africa. International journal of music education 1 (1991): 23-29.
- Turkson, A. R. "The Bi-musical approach of Ephraim Amu to music education in Ghana." Eleventh International Research Seminar in Ghana. 1986.
- promoted choral music in Ghana
- Laryea, Philip T. Ephraim Amu: Nationalist, Poet and Theologian (1899-1995) (Foreword by Emeritus Professor J. H. K. Nketia), Akropong-Akuapem, Regnum Africa, 2012
