= Robin White (journalist) =

British journalist (born 1944)

Robin White, MBE (born 1944), is a British journalist and broadcaster, who was for many years editor of the BBC's programmes Focus on Africa and Network Africa, broadcast on the BBC African Service. He is well known for his interviews with politicians, which have included Charles Taylor, Foday Sankoh, Margaret Thatcher, Milton Obote, Olusegun Obasanjo, Yoweri Museveni, Sam Nujoma, Kenneth Kaunda, and Thabo Mbeki.

== Biography ==
Born in 1944 in Nottingham, England, White took a placement in Cameroon with VSO after graduating from Cambridge. In the late 1960s, he joined the BBC, where he was the editor of Focus on Africa and Network Africa on the BBC African Service. Apart from his work as a journalist on African affairs, he has worked in educational broadcasting and on the British domestic culture and arts programme, Kaleidoscope. He is also a published playwright, with work broadcast by the BBC.

In 2000, White was appointed an MBE for his outstanding contribution to the BBC World Service.
