= Middle East Business Report =

- New titles used as of January 2013
- Created by: BBC World News
- Presented by: Nima Abu-Wardeh
- Country of origin: United Arab Emirates
- Original language: English

Production
- Production location: Dubai (primarily) with shots from other locations
- Running time: 30 minutes

Original release
- Network: BBC World News; BBC News
- Release: 2003 – 2015

Related
- World Business Report; India Business Report; Asia Business Report; Africa Business Report; Business Edition

Middle East Business Report is a monthly half-hour programme broadcast globally on BBC World News; covering business stories across the Middle East.

Presented by Nima Abu-Wardeh the programme was billed as

"Getting behind the issues of trade, business and economics, providing a window on finance and commerce in the Middle East, revealing how this important economic region works and interacts with the rest of the world."

Middle East Business Report was shown on Fridays, Saturdays and Sundays. The final broadcast of the programme was 28 March 2015.

== Presenters ==
Presenter	Current role
Nima Abu-Wardeh	Presenter
Desley Humphrey	Relief Presenter
Howard Johnson	Relief Presenter
Ben Thompson

== See also ==
Marketplace Middle East; similar programme produced by CNN International
