= Ajman TV =

- Broadcast area: United Arab Emirates

Programming
- Language(s): Arabic
- Picture format: 16:9; SD (576i); HD (1080i)

Ownership
- Owner: Al-Murad Group

History
- Launched: 1 February 1996; 29 years ago

Links
- Website: ajmantv.com

Ajman TV is an Emirati commercial television station broadcasting from the Emirate of Ajman. The channel is owned by Al-Murad Group, who also owns the Ajman Independent Studios and Channel 4 FM.

== History ==
Ajman TV began broadcasting on 1 February 1996, long after the founding of the Ajman Independent Studios, which as of the time of the TV station's launch had produced over 7,000 hours of content. The station was inaugurated by Sheikh Humaid bin Rashid Al Nuaimi III of Ajman and broadcast a terrestrial signal on UHF channel 26. The station was known as "Channel 4" because it was the fourth television station in the United Arab Emirates, after Sharjah TV, Emirates Dubai Television (the current Dubai TV which also included Dubai 33, the current Dubai One) and Abu Dhabi Television. On 1 February 1998, two years after the terrestrial launch, Ajman TV expanded its reach by starting its satellite broadcasts on the Arabsat satellite. By 2002, Ajman TV had cemented its position thanks to its broadcast of quiz and game shows, as well as drama and family entertainment. In its early years, Ajman TV had the only English-language special program during Ramadan – a quiz show.

In August 2003, it started broadcasting Channel 7 to 9, carrying Hindi programming. Drama series were supplied by Star Plus.
