= Philip Gbeho =

Ghanaian musician and teacher (1904–1976)

Philip Comi Gbeho
- Born: 14 January 1904; Vodza, Gold Coast
- Died: 24 September 1976 (aged 72)
- Education: Achimota Teacher Training College
- Occupations: Composer, music teacher
- Known for: Arts Council of Ghana; National Symphony Orchestra Ghana
- Notable work: Ghana National Anthem
- Children: 7
- Parent(s): Doe Gbeho; Ametowofa Gadzekpo
- Relatives: James Victor Gbeho (son); Mawuena Trebarh (granddaughter); Komla Dumor (grandson)
- Awards: Grand Medal (Ghana)

Philip Comi Gbeho (14 January 1904 – 24 September 1976) was a Ghanaian musician, composer and teacher. He was instrumental in the establishment of the Arts Council of Ghana and was a director of music and conductor of the National Symphony Orchestra in Ghana. However, he is probably best known as the composer of the musical arrangement for Ghana's National Anthem.

Gbeho grew up in the southeastern town of Keta where he learned to play the organ at school and was a pupil organist. He furthered his musical education at teacher training college. In addition to teaching, he became an organist at the local cathedral where he founded a leading choir and started a small school of music to prepare students for external music exams. He received scholarships to study at the Trinity College of Music in London, where he held lectures, led a dance troupe, and became a regular broadcaster on the BBC overseas radio programmes.

On his return to the Gold Coast, he embarked on a campaign to popularise indigenous music. He was a strong advocate for the establishment of an Arts Council and the building of a National Theatre. He was also the leading force behind the creation of a National Symphony Orchestra and Choir. In 1958, he wrote the musical arrangement for Ghana's national anthem. For his contributions to art and culture, he was honoured in 1965 with a grand medal by the Arts Council of Ghana.

== Early life ==
Gbeho was born on 14 January 1904, in Vodza, a fishing village in the suburb of Keta in the Volta Region. He attended Keta Roman Catholic Boys School, where he learned to play the organ and became a pupil organist. His father, Doe Gbeho, was a fisherman. His mother, Ametowofa (née Gadzekpo), was a trader and the leader of the female singers in the village drumming and dancing group.

In 1925, Philip Gbeho gained admission to Accra's newly-opened Achimota Teacher Training College. While studying to become a teacher, he took advantage of the college's music facilities to improve his knowledge and practice of music and developed, as a pianist and violinist, under the tutelage of the school's expat teachers.

== Early career ==
On graduating in December 1929, Gbeho returned to Keta to teach at the Roman Catholic Boys School. With a strong passion for music, he also resumed his role as organist of the town's St. Michael's Catholic Cathedral where he also founded the St. Cecilia's Choir and transformed it into a leading choir in the district. He also started an informal school of music in Keta that prepared students for the external examinations for London's Victoria College of Music.

Gbeho's efforts caught the attention of the officials at Achimota College, who invited him, in 1938, to teach music at the college. Gbeho accepted the role of an assistant music master that same year.

== Further studies ==
In 1949, Gbeho was offered a one-year scholarship by the British Council to study for the Trinity College of Music licentiate diploma. While studying in London, Gbeho soon gained attention in cultural circles by holding frequent lectures and demonstration sessions on African, especially Gold Coast, music. His dancing group, made up essentially of West African students, soon became very popular and performed in many halls, parks and on British television. Gbeho also became a regular broadcaster on the BBC overseas radio programmes, especially the very popular Calling West Africa programme.

In 1950, Gbeho was granted a Gold Coast government extension scholarship to continue to study at Trinity College of Music for a graduate degree in music. He continued with his lectures, broadcasts and African music performances at various venues in London, including the Artists International Centre in Piccadilly, the West African Students' Union (WASU) Secretariat, Strawberry Hill College, the Royal Empire Society, the Royal Geographical Society, and Royal Kew Gardens. At the same time, Gbeho also took the exams of the Royal Academy of Music privately and earned a Licentiate of the Royal Academy of Music (LRAM) in the teaching of music.

== Later career ==
He returned to the Gold Coast upon graduation to resume teaching music at the Achimota Secondary School.

Inspired by his experiences in the United Kingdom, he embarked on a campaign to popularize indigenous music in schools and colleges all round the country but especially in the missionary schools. He also became a strong advocate of the establishment of an Arts Council and the building of a National Theatre. He also gave several talks on national radio, Radio Ghana, in which he pushed for a renaissance in traditional music in the face of obstacles by colonial missionary officials.

In 1954, when the government decided on setting up a statutory body to "foster, improve and preserve the traditional arts and culture of the Gold Coast", Gbeho was appointed the Chairman of the Interim-Committee for the Arts Council of the Gold Coast. The Committee galvanised interest in Ghanaian culture through its regular arts and crafts exhibitions and regional festivals organized at Ho, Tamale and Cape Coast. The first National Festival of the Arts took place in Accra in March 1957 – the week of Ghana's independence.

In March 1959, Ghebo attended the Second International Congress of Negro Writers and Artists where he was noted for chairing the art panel discussions.

Another notable contribution by Ghebo to music and culture was the creation in 1963 of a National Symphony Orchestra and Choir to promote the understanding and enjoyment of western classical music.

== National Anthem ==
On the eve of Ghana's independence celebrations, Gbeho won an open competition to write the national anthem for the newly independent nation to replace "God Save the Queen".

Out of those entries to a National Anthem Selection Committee, four were shortlisted and played regularly on radio for listeners to indicate their preferences. The choice was overwhelmingly in favour of Gbeho's composition.

Gbeho was paid £3,100 for the music. However, Gbeho's lyrics were later dropped and replaced. The government offered a subsequent prize of 300 guineas for new lyrics. The new words together with Gbeho's musical arrangement would become Ghana's national anthem.

== Awards ==
For Gbeho's effort in establishing the Arts Council of Ghana, he was honoured in 1965 with a national Grand Medal.

In August 1972, Gbeho was presented with a plaque by the Arts Council of Ghana and the Ministry of Education. The citation accompanying the plaque recounted Gbeho's role in the establishment of the Arts Council of Ghana, describing him as the “Father of the present Arts Council of Ghana”, and his role as Director of Music and Conductor of the National Symphony Orchestra.

== Tributes ==
In his first broadcast as Chairman of the Arts Council of Ghana on 26 April 1954, Dr Seth Cudjoe, who succeeded Gbeho as chairman, paid him the following tribute:

"I do not think the present generation will ever forget the inspiration and immediate response which the interim committee (of the Arts Council) engendered from the start. Nor do I believe that Philip Gbeho’s great enthusiasm, energy and strong personality will be forgotten when the cultural history of our country comes to be re-written. The achievement of the interim committee which he headed as chairman has laid the foundation on which the statutory Arts Council of Ghana body cannot fail to build with success."

Geoffrey Mensah Amoah, the Director and head of the National Symphony Orchestra, provides more about his former tutor and boss:

"Gbeho was a great conductor and leader of the group. Most memorable in his name is the collection he made of some popular highlife tunes and indigenous songs which he arranged for performance by the Orchestra and the Dance Company. In all, he wrote out eight indigenous Yewe songs: 'Kondo Yi Yevuwo De Megboo', 'Miawo Mie Gbona Afegame', 'Enyo Enyo Nuto Yae Enyo', 'Aklie Do Gokame Tu Di Le Anago', 'Nuwo Za Medo O'. It was also through his performance of G. F. Handel's Messiah at the Holy Spirit Cathedral that many choir groups got to know that it was possible to perform the tune with orchestral accompaniment."

== Personal life and death ==
Philip Gbeho died on 24 September 1976. He was married with seven children.

His children included James Victor Gbeho, a diplomat and Minister of Foreign Affairs, Theresa Abui Tetteh, an organist, music teacher and the Director of the National Symphony Orchestra Ghana, and Peter Tsatsu Gbeho, a Director at the Ministry of Information.
