= Nima Abu-Wardeh =

BBC journalist

- Born: June 1968 (age 58); Chorley, Lancashire, England
- Education: University of Kent
- Occupation: Journalist

Nima Abu-Wardeh (Arabic: نعمة أبو وردة; born June 1968) is a British keynote speaker, creator of online programmes, journalist, columnist and coach.

Her talks focus on Equality and Bias, and the Financial Facts Females Find Out The Hard Way.

Nima was named Ambassador for Women In Construction - the Big 5, and a judge for WomenTech Network.

== Early life and education ==
Abu-Wardeh was born in Chorley, Lancashire and is of British-Palestinian and Irish heritage. She moved to Kuwait at the age of 7. Upon returning to England, Abu-Wardeh studied medical engineering at the University of Kent. She went on to pursue a Master of Science (MSc) in health service.

== Career ==
Her work in the area of behavioural economics led her to creating grass-roots personal finance events. UAE Saves Week, created by Nima, trended in 2013.

She is of Palestinian & Irish descent and was born in the UK. She presented BBC World's business and finance programme, Middle East Business Report for its lifetime and was part of the team that set it up. She has written opinion pieces for Forbes Arabia and has taught media courses at Zayed University in the UAE as a visiting lecturer.

Nima is an Advisory Board Member for the University of Surrey's GSA (Guildford School of Acting), and a former board member of the Arab Thought Foundation, and the World Congress of History Producers.
