= Channel 4 FM =

104.8 Channel 4
- Ajman; United Arab Emirates
- Frequency: 104.8 FM

Programming
- Format: Rhythmic CHR

Ownership
- Owner: Ajman Independent Studios
- Sister stations: Radio 4 89.1; Gold 101.3 FM; Al Rabia 107.8 FM

History
- First air date: 1 June 1997

Links
- Website: channel4fm.com

104.8 Channel 4 FM is the first English-language radio station in the United Arab Emirates. It launched on 1 June 1997 and plays music for a target audience of 18-34 year olds. The name is taken from the nickname of its sister television channel Ajman TV, which was also known as "Channel 4" at its beginning - as it was the fourth emirate to have its own television station.
