= Asia Business Report =

2003 Singaporean TV news programme

- Created by: BBC News
- Presented by: Steve Lai; Mariko Oi
- Country of origin: Singapore
- Original language: English

Production
- Production location: Singapore
- Running time: 15 minutes

Original release
- Network: BBC News (international feed); BBC News (UK feed); BBC One
- Release: 2003 – 7 May 2024

Related
- Newsday; BBC Business Today; World Business Report; Middle East Business Report; Africa Business Report; India Business Report; Business Edition

Asia Business Report (replaced by Business Today) is a business news programme produced by the BBC and is shown on International feed during the Asian morning hours. This programme used to be available exclusively in Asia-Pacific, South Asia and Middle East but, as of a 1 February 2010 revamp, was aired worldwide. It was also aired on the UK's domestic UK feed of BBC News channel and BBC One channel three times daily in the early hours of the morning as part of the Newsday programme. Due to COVID-19 pandemic, Asia Business Report was only followed on BBC World News at 2330 GMT, 0030 GMT, and 0130 GMT.

It is broadcast from the BBC's bureau which is in Singapore's central business district. The main presenter is Steve Lai.

Steve Lai announced on 7 May 2024 in the programme that Asia Business Report was coming to an end and that it was the final edition that he presented, as the programme was to be replaced by Business Today, uniting Asia Business Report and World Business Report under one brand.

== Presenters ==
These are presenters at the time the programme ended in 2024.

Presenter	Current role
Steve Lai	Main Presenter
Mariko Oi	Relief Presenter
Maura Fogarty	Relief Presenter
Monica Miller	Relief Presenter
Suranjana Tewari	Relief Presenter
Arunoday Mukharji	Relief Presenter

== Former presenters ==
Years	Presenter	role
2003–2020	Rico Hizon	Main presenter (Monday-Wednesday, alternate Sunday/Thursday)
2005–2021	Sharanjit Leyl	Presenter
2013–2015	Ali Moore	Relief presenter
