= Robin Bantry White =

Irish Anglican priest:

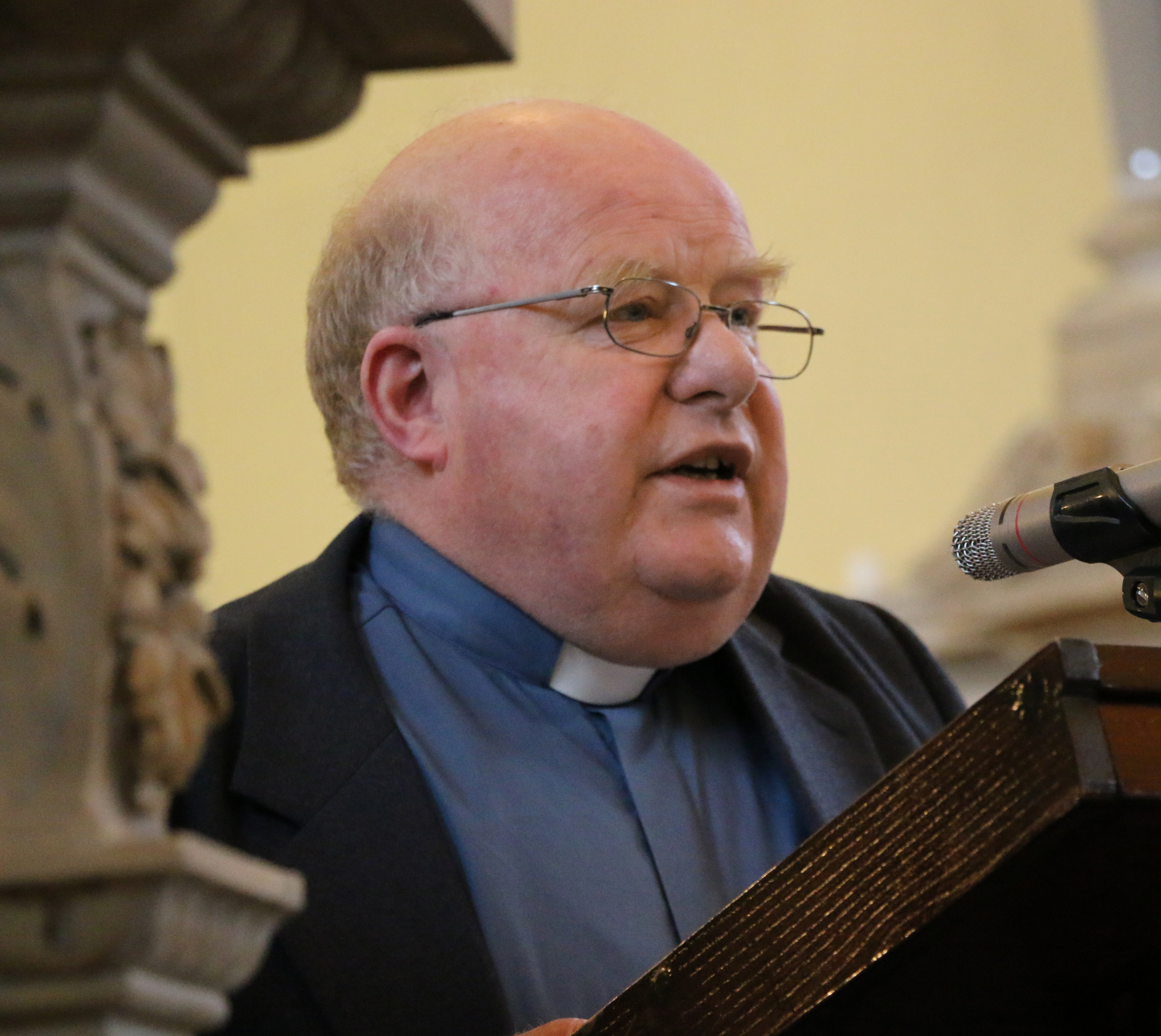
The Venerable Robin Bantry White in 2016

Robin Edward Bantry White is an Irish Anglican priest: he was Archdeacon of Cork, Cloyne and Ross from 1993 to 2014.

White was born in 1947, educated at Trinity College, Dublin and ordained in 1973. After curacies in Dublin and Taney he was incumbent at Abbeystrewry from 1979 to 1989. He was then at Douglas, County Cork from 1989 to 2002; and Moviddy until 2014. He was also Prebendary of Castleknock at St Patrick's Cathedral, Dublin from 2009 until 2014.
