= Ato Turkson =

Ghanaian composer and musicologist

Adolphus Acquah Robertson Turkson (12 September 1933 – 21 June 1993), better known as Ato Turkson, was a Ghanaian composer and musicologist.

== Education ==
Turkson was born in Winneba in southern Ghana. He studied music at the University of Ghana, graduating in 1964. He undertook further study in composition at the Franz Liszt Academy of Music in Budapest, Hungary, studying under Rezső Sugár. He gained a master's degree and doctorate in musicology at Northwestern University in Illinois. His doctoral dissertation focussed on the traditional music of the Efutu people.

== Academic career ==
Turkson spent most of his academic career at the University of Ghana. He was also visiting scholar at the University of Cologne (1978) and Portland State University (1982).

== Composition ==
According to Daniel Avorgbedor, Turkson's compositions were "largely rooted in 20th-century avant-garde techniques", in particular in his use of atonality and serialism. Most of his early piano works were of an educational nature. His later compositions included indigenous elements, inspired partly by his earlier research into Efutu music. Most of his works were published by the University of Ife Press in Nigeria. His best-known work is Three pieces for flute and piano (1968).

== Selected compositions ==
- Trio, op. 3 (1965)
- Six easy pieces for piano, op. 4 (1965)
- Serenade no. 1 for string orchestra, op. 5 (1965)
- String quartet, op. 6 (1966)
- Serenade no. 2 for string orchestra, op. 7 (1966)
- Te Deum, op. 8 (1966)
- Oboe quintet, op. 9 (1966)
- Three pieces for flute and piano, op. 14 (1968)
- Three pieces for oboe and piano, op. 15 (1968)
- Sonata for violin, op. 16.
- Elements I, op. 19 (1970)
- Symphony, op. 20 (1970)
- Symphony, op. 21 (1970)
- Fanta Lyric for Flute Solo, op. 22 (1970)
- Six piano pieces, op. 12 (1977)

== Published works ==
- "Evolution of the Fante Sacred Lyric". Institute of African Studies Research Review. 9 (3). 1973.
- Turkson, A. A. (1982). "Effutu Asafo: its Organization and Music". African Music. 6 (2): 4–16. doi:10.21504/amj.v6i2.1113.
- "Educational Exchange: A Catalyst for New Studies". American Studies International. 20 (2): 37–45. 1982. (as Adolphus Turkson)
- Turkson, Adolphus R. (1987). "A Voice in the African Process of Crossing from the Traditional to Modernity: the Music of Ephraim Amu". Ultimate Reality and Meaning. 10 (1): 39–53. doi:10.3138/uram.10.1.39.
- "Music and Games in Early African Childhood Education". African Music Education. 7: 1–2. 1989. (as Adolphus Turkson)
- J.C. DjeDje and W.G. Carter, ed. (1989). "Contrafactum and Parodied Song Texts in Religious Music: a Discussion of Problems and Challenges in Contemporary African Music". African Musicology: Current Trends: a Festschrift presented to J.H. Kwabena Nketia. pp. 65–80.
