= Nancy Kacungira =

Ugandan television presenter and reporter (born 1986)

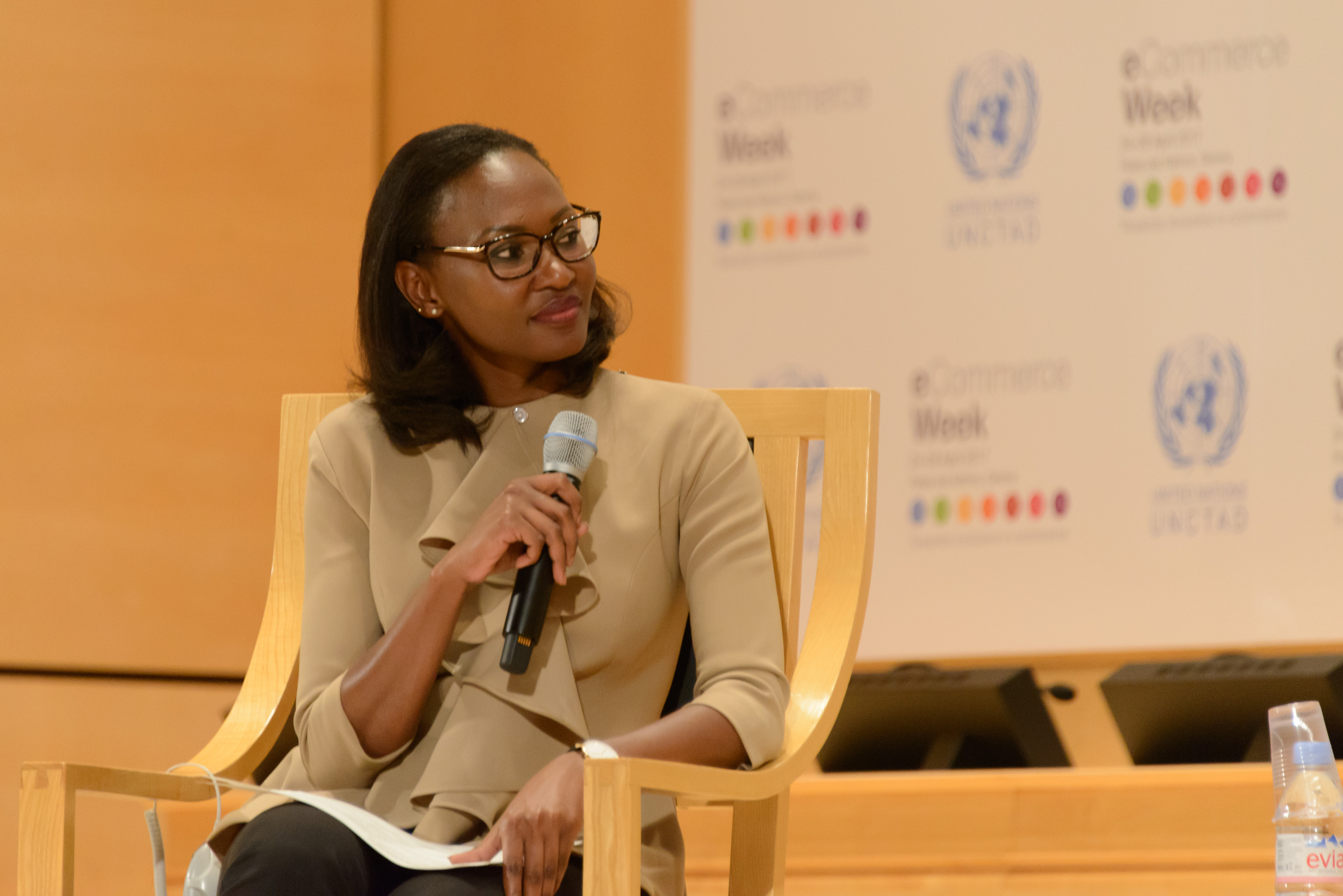
- Kacungira in 2017
- Born: 1986 (age 39–40); Tanzania
- Occupations: Journalist, news anchor
- Employer: BBC
- Known for: Co-founder of Blu Flamingo
- Notable work: Focus on Africa (TV programme); World News Today with Nancy Kacungira; In Business Africa; The Daily Global with Nancy Kacungira
- Father: Clifford Kacungira
- Relatives: Seanice Lojede (sister)
- Awards: 2015 BBC World News Komla Dumor Award
- Website: kacungira.com

Nancy Kacungira (born 1986) is a Ugandan presenter and reporter at BBC News. She presented Focus on Africa from 2017 to January 2019 and World Business Report on BBC World News.

== Background and education ==
Kacungira was born on October 11, 1986 to Clifford Kacungira in Tanzania. She studied at Namasagali college for her O level and later Kibuli Secondary School for A level. She then earned her Master of Arts degree in Communication Studies from the University of Leeds, where she graduated with distinction.

== Career ==
Kacungira began as a radio presenter while still at university, working her way up from intern to Deputy Program Director.

Kacungira began her media career as a radio presenter at Power FM, a Christian radio station in Kampala, Uganda. In 2010, Kacungira together with her older sister Seanice Kacungira co-founded Blu Flamingo; a digital media management company. She moved from radio to TV at NTV Uganda as a newsreader from 2012 to 2013, after which she moved to Kenya to work for KTN News Kenya as a social media editor in late 2013.

While still at KTN News Kenya in 2015, Kacungira applied for the Komla Dumor Award, which she won and went to the BBC for three months' training. She then returned to KTN News Kenya but was later hired by the BBC where she presented Focus on Africa, but later became the main presenter of World News Today and In Business Africa, a main presenter at weekends and correspondent both BBC News Channel and BBC World News.

In 2016, Kacungira was one of the two moderators at the Ugandan presidential debate with another Ugandan BBC presenter Alan Kasujja.

After a stint presenting World News Today in August 2018, she became the main presenter at 7 pm weekdays and 9 pm weekends from September 2019 when she is not on assignment, as part of here 19:00–01:00GMT/BST, on BBC Four, BBC News Channel and BBC World News, and has presented In Business Africa since January 2019, a programme she presented alongside Ashionye Ogene. She also is a relief presenter for The Briefing at 05:00GMT on BBC One, BBC News Channel and BBC World News. In 2022, she also started presenting on BBC World Service Outside Source, but she never presented the TV version.

At the beginning of June 2020, she began presenting most of the evening output two in three weekends, on both BBC News Channel and BBC World News. Including the second half of BBC News at Ten on Friday and Saturday, alternative Sundays. Since April 2023 main presenters and correspondents for the new merged BBC News Channel covering for its chief presenters, presenting mainly evening programmes The World Today with Nancy Kacungira, the successor to World News Today, which was rebranded from The Daily Global while she was on maternity leave, The Context, UK-opt outs, BBC News at One and the BBC Weekend News.

Following the merger of BBC World News and BBC News in April 2023, Kacungira became one of the main presenters and correspondents for the new channel covering for its chief presenters, presenting mainly evening programmes The Daily Global with Nancy Kacungira, The Context, UK-opt outs and the BBC Weekend News. She was also the presenter and correspondent covering Prince Harry, Duke of Sussex phone hacking case against Mirror Group Newspapers (MGN) and political events at Westminster including Privileges Committee publicization of a report, which concluded that Boris Johnson lied to and deliberately misled the House of Commons over Partygate, misled the Committee themselves during the hearing, and acted in contempt of the Committee itself through a "campaign of abuse and intimidation".

== Awards ==
- 2015 – BBC World News Komla Dumor Award

== Personal life ==
Kacungira announced via Instagram that she had got married in January 2023. In December 2024, she announced she gave birth to a boy.

Media offices
Preceded by Philippa Thomas	Main Presenter of World News Today; 2018–present	Succeeded by TBA
