= Ikulu =

Historical building in Tanzania

The State House of The United Republic of Tanzania
- Ikulu
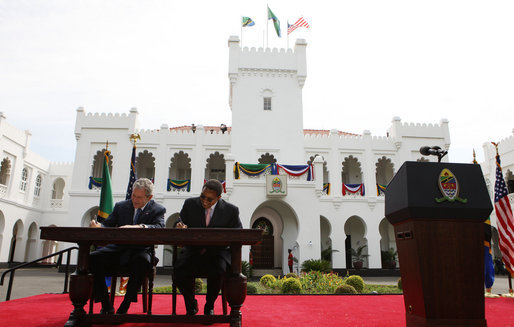
- US President George W. Bush and Tanzanian President Jakaya Mrisho Kikwete signed the Millennium Challenge Compact in February 2008.
- Interactive map of the The State House of The United Republic of Tanzania area
- Former names: Government House

General information
- Architectural style: African and Arabian
- Location: 11400, Kivukoni, Dar es Salaam, Tanzania
- Coordinates: 6°48′57″S 39°17′54″E
- Current tenants: Samia Suluhu Hassan
- Owner: Government of Tanzania

Website
- State House Website

Ikulu is the official residence of the president of Tanzania in Dar es Salaam which was founded by Majid bin Said of Zanzibar in 1865.

The State House blends African and Arabian architecture, with wide verandahs and covered walkways. It is white-walled with floors of African terrazzo, and stands in over 33 acres (13 ha) of grounds overlooking the Indian Ocean on the east and Dar es Salaam to the west. The brass-studded west doors are surmounted by a replica of the Republic's Coat of Arms and flanked by two giant drums. During 2001 one of the entrances after the car gates was adorned with two male Lions overlooking guests as they would be welcomed to the State House of The United Republic Of Tanzania.

The building contains a number of gifts from state visitors, including an Ethiopian shield with crossed spears, given by Emperor Haile Selassie and a representation of the coat-of-arms of the Republic of Tanganyika, given by the government of India in 1961, that acts as a backdrop to the President's seat in the Council Chamber.

== Gallery ==
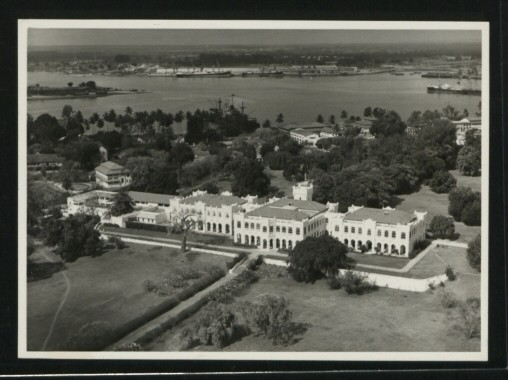
The Government House, in the 1960s decade.

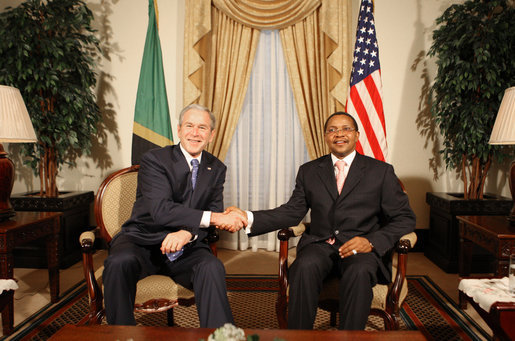
The 43rd President of The United States of America, George W. Bush and The 4th President of The United Republic of Tanzania Jakaya Mrisho Kikwete in 2008.
