= Didi Akinyelure =

British/Nigerian journalist

- Education: Nottingham University
- Occupation: Journalist
- Years active: 2011-present
- Spouse: Akin Akinyelure
- Children: 2
- Awards: BBC World News Komla Dumor Award 2016, University of Nottingham Special Excellence Alumni Laureate Award 2018

Didi Akinyelure is a British/Nigerian journalist. In July 2016, she won the BBC World News Komla Dumor Award. She was the face of CNBC Africa's live morning show Open Exchange, West Africa.

== Background, education and career ==
Akinyelure is a multimedia journalist with experience in television, radio, text and digital for the BBC, CNBC and Reuters News Agency. She graduated from University of Nottingham with a 2:1 degree in chemical engineering. In 2016, she won the BBC World News Komla Dumor Award. In December 2018, she received the University of Nottingham Special Excellence Alumni Laureate Award.

She presented the CNBC Europe series on digital transformation titled ‘I.O.T: Powering the Digital Economy’ and BBC World Service series on climate change ‘Living on the Edge’.

She has presented, produced and edited television, radio and digital content for the BBC News at Ten, BBC World News, BBC World Service, BBC Focus on Africa, BBC Business Daily, BBC Newsday, and BBC Radio 4.

Her report on female entrepreneurship was long listed in the World Bank Women Entrepreneurship reporting category at the One World Media awards in 2018.

She has been featured in Forbes Africa magazine and included in a list of the most influential business journalists in the world.

She is an Entrepreneur, having created and produced her own television content, titled A Place in Africa, a Pan-African lifestyle property TV show. Akinyelure also launched REAP, a media production, reputational management and communications strategy firm.

In April 2019, Akinyelure launched April & Alex, a contemporary womenswear brand. The brand has been featured in Vogue, Tatler, Elle, Marie Claire and Harpers Bazaar amongst others.

Akinyelure has built a career as an Events Moderator and Speaker. In May 2019, she chaired a conversation at the United Nations in Geneva. Panelists include Dame Wendy Hall, Nobel Laureate, Prof. Carlo Rubbia and Prof. Jurgen Schmidhuber. In 2018 she chaired a United Nations conversation with Sir Roger Penrose and Nobel Laureate Jacques Dubochet.

She also moderated a panel at the Africa CEO forum, and hosted the Africa CEO awards and gala dinner. She moderated the entrepreneurship panel at London Business School Africa Summit, and the Future Energy Africa exhibition and conference in Cape Town, South Africa.

She chaired the Africa Construction Week in Munich, Germany, anchored the ministerial panel at the Africa Oil Week in Cape Town, a panel at the Access Bank International Women's Day Conference, WimBiz, and the Africa Women Innovation and Entrepreneurship Forum.

Prior to this, she presented the BBC Africa Debate on Fake News in Malawi and the BBC Women in Digital Journalism panel at Social Media Week in Lagos.

She also hosted the University of Nottingham Africa Summit, the Future Energy Exhibition and Conference, the West Africa Property Investment Summit, the ‘Lagos at 50’ International Conference and the ‘Lagos Kano Economic Summit’.

In September 2017, was invited by the United Nations to interview delegates at the UN Convention to Combat Desertification in Ordos, China.

Akinyelure has interviewed notable political figures and global business leaders.

Prior to her career in journalism, Akinyelure worked at Barclays Wealth in London.
