= Lerato Mbele =

South African broadcast journalist

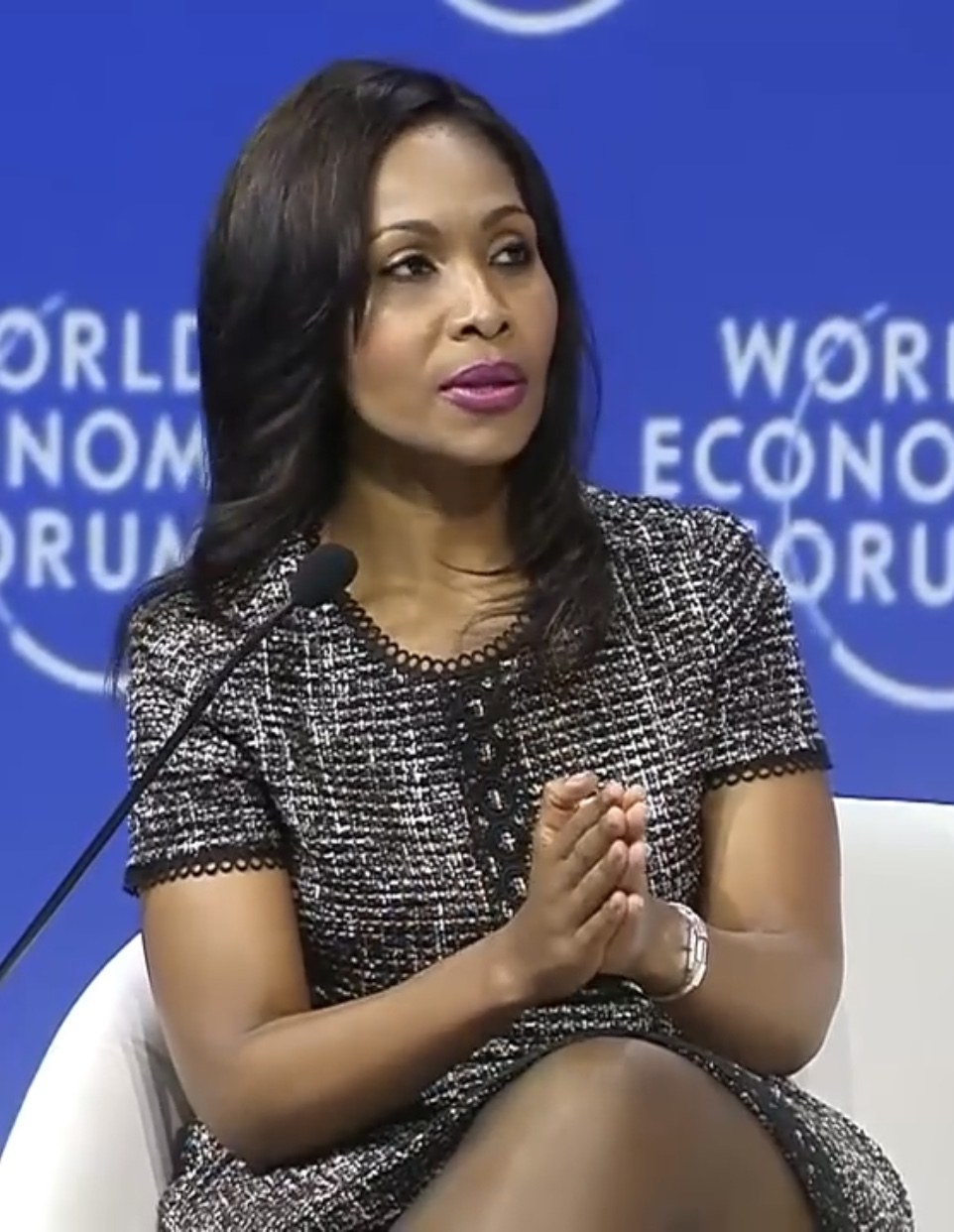
- Mbele in 2019
- Born: Soweto, South Africa
- Education: University of Cape Town; University of Stellenbosch; University of London
- Occupation(s): Journalist, broadcaster
- Television: Newsday; Africa Business Report; Talking Business Africa

Lerato Mbele is a South African journalist and broadcaster working for the BBC. Mbele currently presents Talking Business Africa for the network. She previously presented the Africa Business Report and Newsday.

== Early life ==
Mbele was born in Soweto, South Africa and grew up in Pimville. She graduated with a bachelor's degree in politics and international relations from the University of Cape Town and a master's in development economics studies from a London School of Economics.

== Career ==
Mbele began working for the South African Broadcasting Corporation in 1999, rising to become an anchor for its programme News at Ten. In 2007 Mbele joined CNBC Africa at its launch as one of the channel's senior business presenters. While at CNBC she hosted regular programmes on the channel in addition to coverage of many other business events, such as the World Economic Forum.

In 2012 Mbele joined BBC News to help launch and present Newsday on the BBC World Service with Lawrence Pollard. The two presented from 6–8.30am (UK time) each weekday. Now she is the presenter of “Talking Business Africa” a lifestyle business show focusing on prominent entrepreneurs and their business mindset in the boardroom and on the factory floor, which Mbele explores alongside them for a hands on experience. She was also the long standing presenter for Africa Business Report, a weekly programme that provided analyses on different sectors of the economy across African countries. It also featured leading business personalities from the African continent. Interviews by Mbele also appear on BBC World News and on World Business Report.

In 2014 Mbele was named a Young Global Leader by the Switzerland based World Economic Forum, in the cohort selected that year.
