= BBC Focus on Africa =

UK magazine (1990–2012)

- Frequency: Quarterly
- Circulation: 70,000 per quarter, potential pass-on readership 420,000
- First issue: 1990
- Final issue: October 2012
- Company: BBC World Service
- Country: United Kingdom
- Based in: London
- Language: English
- Website: www.bbc.co.uk/focusonafricamagazine/index.shtml
- ISSN: 0959-9576
- OCLC: 22498362

BBC Focus on Africa was a quarterly magazine established in 1990, based in London, UK, and available widely in Africa and in English-speaking countries globally. The magazine covered news, politics, economics, social events, culture and sport, and had access to correspondents based across Africa. The last edition was published in October 2012, making it the last BBC World Service magazine to close down after London Calling and On Air.
