= Focus on Africa (TV programme) =

2012 BBC news programme

- Title card used since 2023
- Created by: BBC Africa for BBC News
- Presented by: Waihiga Mwaura; Rhoda Odhiambo
- Country of origin: United Kingdom
- Original language: English

Production
- Production locations: Studio L, Broadcasting House, London (2013–2023); BBC Nairobi Bureau, Nairobi, Kenya (2023–present)
- Running time: 26 minutes

Original release
- Network: BBC News (International feed)
- Release: 18 June 2012 – present

Related
- Focus on Africa (radio); BBC News Channel; BBC World News America; Newsday; GMT; Impact; Global; World News Today; Africa Business Report

Focus on Africa is a BBC news programme broadcast on the international feed of the BBC News channel, and on local partner channels of the BBC in African countries. The programme was presented by Komla Dumor each weekday from its inception until his sudden death, aged 41, in January 2014. The programme includes news, sport and business from across Africa and around the world.

The programme was closely related to Dira ya Dunia, an African-focused programme broadcast on BBC Swahili, which noticeably used the same title sequence.

== Broadcasts ==
Focus on Africa is aired from 18:30 to 19:00 GMT (17:30–18:00 BST during summer months in the UK and the northern hemisphere) weekdays on the BBC News channel's international feed. The programme also airs on affiliate networks across Africa, which broadcast it as a prime time news programme.

== Presenters ==
Since the move to Nairobi the on-air team has been reduced, with fewer relief presenters due to the formers being based in London.

=== Current ===
Years	Presenter	Current role
2023–present	Waihiga Mwaura	Senior lead presenter
2023–present	Rhoda Odhiambo	Main presenter & journalist

=== Former ===
- Komla Dumor (Main presenter, 2012–2014)
- Salim Kikeke (2014–2023)
- Sophie Ikenye (Main Presenter, 2012-2023)
- Peter Okwoche (Deputy Presenter, 2012-2023)
- Nancy Kacungira (Relief Presenter, 2014-2023)
- Lukwesa Burak (Relief Presenter, 2017-2023)
- Piers Edwards (Deputy Sports Presenter, 2014-2023)
