= God Bless Our Homeland Ghana =

National anthem of Ghana

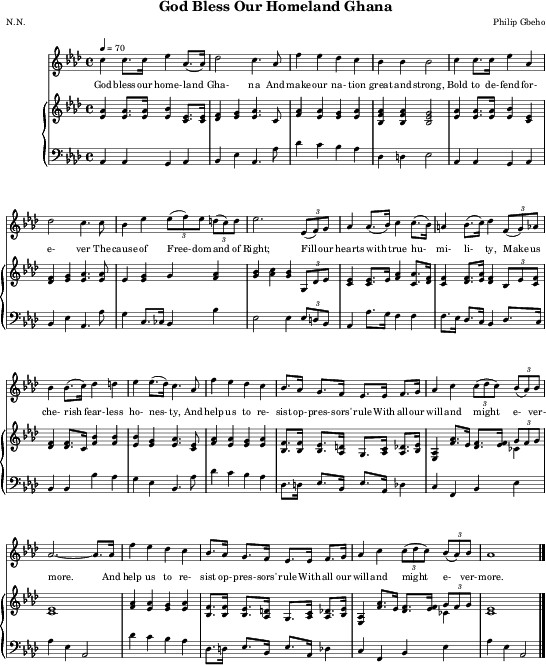
- The lyrics of "God Bless Our Homeland Ghana" above an orchestral reduction sheet music of the National Symphony Orchestra Ghana.
- National anthem of Ghana
- Lyrics: Michael Kwame Gbordzoe
- Music: Philip Gbeho
- Adopted: 1957

Audio sample
- U.S. Navy Band instrumental version (one verse): file; help

"God Bless Our Homeland Ghana" is the national anthem of Ghana; it was adopted in 1957 when Ghana declared its independence from the United Kingdom.

== History ==
Universal Newsreel about the establishment of Ghana in 1957

The music for the national anthem was originally composed by Philip Gbeho and sang to lyrics written by Emmanuel Pappoe-Thompson. However the words were revised by a literary committee in the Office of the then head of state, Kwame Nkrumah. Michael Kwame Gbordzoe has made claims to the current lyrics being used saying that it was written by him after the overthrow of President Nkrumah. A competition was held and Kwame Gbordzoe, who was then a student at Bishop Herman College, presented the current lyrics which were chosen to replace "Lift High The Flag Of Ghana" which had been officially adopted after independence and used as Ghana's national anthem during Nkrumah's presidency.

== Lyrics ==
=== Current lyrics ===
The current lyrics of the "God Bless Our Homeland Ghana" national anthem that has been in use since the 1970s were written by Michael Kwame Gbordzoe while a student within the framework of a national competition, and is accompanied by Ghana's national pledge.

Thus, the official current lyrics of "God Bless Our Homeland Ghana" are as follows:

English lyrics

I
God bless our motherland Ghana
And make our nation great and strong,
Bold to defend forever
The cause of Freedom and of Right;
Fill our hearts with true humility,
Make us cherish fearless honesty,
𝄆 And help us to resist oppressors' rule
With all our will and might for evermore. 𝄇

II
Hail to thy name, O Ghana,
To thee we make our solemn vow:
Steadfast to build together
A nation strong in Unity;
With our gifts of mind and strength of arm,
Whether night or day, in mist or storm,
𝄆 In every need, whate'er the call may be,
To serve thee, Ghana, now and for evermore. 𝄇

III
Raise high the flag of Ghana
and one with Africa advance;
Black star of hope and honour
To all who thirst for liberty;
Where the banner of Ghana freely flies,
May the way to freedom truly lie;
𝄆 Arise, arise, O sons of Ghana land,
And under God march on for evermore! 𝄇

Twi translation

I
Nyame nhyira yɛn kurom Gaana
Na ma yɛn man no nyɛ kɛse na ɛnyɛ den,
Akokoduru a wɔde bɛbɔ wɔn ho ban daa
Ahofadi ne Hokwan ho asɛm;
Fa ahobrɛase ankasa hyɛ yɛn koma ma,
Ma yɛn ani nnye nokwaredi a ensuro ho,
𝄆 C Na boa yɛn ma yɛnko tia nhyɛsofo nniso
Yɛde yɛn pɛ ne yɛn ahoɔden nyinaa daa daa. 𝄇

II
O Gaana, nkamfo nka wo din,
Wo na yɛhyɛ yɛn bɔ a ɛyɛ aniberesɛm.
Gyina pintinn sɛ wɔbɛbom akyekye
Ɔman a ɛyɛ den wɔ Biakoyɛ mu;
Yɛnam yɛn adwene ne basa ahoɔden akyɛde ahorow no so,
Sɛ́ ɛyɛ anadwo anaa awia, wɔ nsuyiri anaa ahum mu no,
𝄆 C Wɔ ahiade biara mu no, whate'er frɛ no betumi ayɛ,
Sɛ mɛsom wo, Gaana, seesei ne daa daa. 𝄇

III
Ma Gaana frankaa so kɔ soro
Ne biako a Afrika anya nkɔso;
Nsoromma tuntum a anidaso ne nidi wom
Wɔde kɔma wɔn a ahofadi ho sukɔm de wɔn no nyinaa;
Baabi a Gaana frankaa no tu fa ne ho no,
Ɛmmra sɛ ɔkwan a ɛkɔ ahofadi mu no nni atoro ampa;
𝄆 A Gaana asase so mma, monsɔre, monsɔre,
Na Onyankopɔn ase no, nantew kɔ so daa! 𝄇

Ewe translation

I
Mawu nayra mía denyigba Ghana
Eye na míaƒe dukɔa nalolo eye wòasẽ ŋu,
Dzinɔameƒotɔe be wòaʋli eta tegbee
Ablɔɖe kple Gomenɔamesi ƒe Nya;
Mitsɔ ɖokuibɔbɔ vavãtɔ yɔ míaƒe dziwo me fũ,
Na míade asixɔxɔ anukwareɖiɖi si me vɔvɔ̃ mele o ŋu,
𝄆 Z Eye nàkpe ɖe mía ŋu míatsi tre ɖe ameteteɖeanyilawo ƒe dziɖuɖu ŋu
Le míaƒe lɔlɔ̃nu kple ŋusẽ katã me tegbee. 𝄇

II
Mido gbe na wò ŋkɔ, Oo Ghana,
Wòe míedo míaƒe adzɔgbe vevi la na wò.
Mili ke be miatu nu ɖekae
Dukɔ si sesẽ le Ðekawɔwɔ me;
Le míaƒe susu kple alɔ ƒe ŋusẽ ƒe nunanawo me la,
Eɖanye zã alo keli o, le kuɖiɖi alo ahom me,
𝄆 X Le hiahiã ɖesiaɖe me la, yɔyɔ ka kee ɖanye o, .
Be masubɔ wò, Ghana, fifia kple tegbee. 𝄇

III
Do Ghana ƒe aflaga ɖe dzi
Kple ɖeka si me Afrika do ŋgɔ le;
Mɔkpɔkpɔ kple bubu ƒe ɣletivi ameyibɔ
Na amesiwo katã ƒe ablɔɖe ƒe tsikɔ le wuwum;
Afisi Ghana ƒe aflaga dzona faa le la,
Neva eme be ablɔɖemɔ la nanye alakpa vavã;
𝄆 O Ghana-nyigba dzi viwo, tso, tso,
Eye le Mawu te la, yi edzi tegbee! 𝄇

French translation

I
Que Dieu bénisse notre patrie Ghana
Et rends notre nation grande et forte,
Audacieux pour défendre pour toujours
La cause de la Liberté et du Droit;
Remplissez nos cœurs d'une véritable humilité,
Fais-nous chérir une honnêteté intrépide,
𝄆 Et aide-nous à résister au règne des oppresseurs
Avec toute notre volonté et notre puissance pour toujours. 𝄇

II
Salut à ton nom, ô Ghana,
Nous te faisons notre vœu solennel :
Résolus à construire ensemble
Une nation forte dans l’unité;
Avec nos dons d'esprit et notre force de bras,
Que ce soit la nuit ou le jour,
dans la brume ou dans la tempête,
𝄆 Dans chaque besoin, quel que soit l'appel,
Pour te servir, Ghana, maintenant et pour toujours. 𝄇

III
Élevez haut le drapeau du Ghana et un avec Afrique avance;
Étoile noire d'espoir et d'honneur
À tous ceux qui ont soif de liberté;
Là où flotte librement la bannière du Ghana,
Que le chemin vers la liberté se trouve vraiment;
𝄆 Levez-vous, lèvez-vous, ô fils du pays du Ghana,
Et sous Dieu, marchez pour toujours ! 𝄇

Thus, although Philip Gbeho’s composition is still being used, the current lyrics beginning "God Bless our Homeland Ghana" do not originate from him.

Michael Kwame Gbordzoe, who became a scientist by profession, has drawn the attention of the Ghana Government to the fact that although his lyrics have been adopted for the country's national anthem since the 1970s, there has so far been no official Ghana Government recognition for his work, which may be attributed to the abrupt changes in regimes in Ghana in the past.

Messages were sent to various Ghanaian government agencies, and was also discussed on air at the Ghana Broadcasting Corporation (GBC), Uniiq FM programme PTGlive, on 9 March 2008.

=== National Pledge of Ghana ===
The National Pledge of Ghana is recited immediately after "God Bless Our Homeland Ghana".
