= BBC Newsroom Live =

- Final title card, used in 2019 to 2020.
- Created by: BBC News
- Presented by: Joanna Gosling; Martine Croxall; Shaun Ley
- Theme music composer: David Lowe
- Country of origin: United Kingdom
- Original language: English

Production
- Production locations: Studio E, Broadcasting House, London 2016-present
- Camera setup: Multi-camera setup
- Running time: 2 Hours

Original release
- Network: BBC News
- Release: 21 March 2016 – 24 April 2021

Related
- BBC Breakfast; BBC News at One; BBC News at Five; BBC News at Six; BBC News at Ten; BBC Weekend News

BBC Newsroom Live is a news and current affairs programme that was broadcast on the BBC News Channel and BBC Two. It was broadcast from 11:00 to 13:00 and was followed by the BBC News at One usually with Sophie Raworth or Kate Silverton. The first programme was broadcast on the BBC News Channel on 21 March 2016 presented by Joanna Gosling. The main presenters included Gosling, Annita McVeigh and formerly Carrie Gracie. The programme's motto is "Stay up to date on the day's top stories, with the latest breaking news as it happens." During the COVID-19 pandemic, Joanna Gosling presented Monday-Wednesday with Martine Croxall presenting Thursday-Friday but other presenters presented as relief.

Since 2020, the news programme at this slot no longer carries the name Newsroom Live, but simply branded a generic BBC News bulletin.

On 24 April 2021, the BBC rolled out a new repetitive presenting rota for the newsreaders - lasting for 4 weeks before it starts again.

== Presenters ==
| | Week 1 | Week 2 | Week 3 | Week 4 |
|---|---|---|---|---|
| Monday | Joanna Gosling | Joanna Gosling | Joanna Gosling | Joanna Gosling |
| Tuesday | Joanna Gosling | Annita McVeigh | Joanna Gosling | Joanna Gosling |
| Wednesday | Joanna Gosling | Annita McVeigh | Joanna Gosling | Annita McVeigh |
| Thursday | Joanna Gosling | Annita McVeigh | Martine Croxall | Geeta Guru-Murthy |
| Friday | Annita McVeigh | Joanna Gosling | Martine Croxall | Annita McVeigh |

Relief presenters include Kasia Madera, Tim Wilcox, Geeta Guru-Murthy, Luxmy Gopal, Martine Croxall, Ben Thompson and Lukwesa Burak.

== Former presenters ==
Maxine Mawhinney (relief 2016-2017)

Carrie Gracie (2016-2020)
