= Victoria Derbyshire (TV programme) =

British television series

- Title
- Genre: News and current affairs
- Created by: BBC News
- Presented by: Victoria Derbyshire; Joanna Gosling
- Theme music composer: David Lowe
- Country of origin: United Kingdom
- Original language: English

Production
- Production locations: Studio B, Broadcasting House, London, England
- Editors: Liz Gibbons (2018–2020); Louisa Compton (2015–June 2018)
- Running time: 120 minutes (2015–2018); 60 minutes (2018–2020)

Original release
- Network: BBC News; BBC Two
- Release: 7 April 2015 – 17 March 2020

Related
- Victoria Derbyshire (BBC Radio 5 Live)

Victoria Derbyshire is a British weekday current affairs programme, which was simulcast from April 2015 to March 2020 on BBC Two and BBC News Channel, hosted by Victoria Derbyshire. Its remit includes original stories, exclusive interviews and audience debates.

It also acts as a showcase for BBC journalism using reports and interviews by BBC Nations and Regions, BBC World Service, language services and other programmes such as Newsnight, World News Today and Global, plus the BBC Online teams such as BBC Trending and BBC Pop Up. Occasionally the uncut versions of interviews were aired as well, in this case they were taken in place of HARDtalk and aired by BBC World News as well.

== Broadcasting ==
Until 2018, the show was broadcast live on BBC Two and BBC News from 9:00 am to 11:00 am every Monday to Friday, from then on its start time was shifted forward an hour to 10:00am. Its episodes were available to watch for 30 days after release on the BBC iPlayer catch-up service. On 22 January 2020, it was announced that the programme would be axed in later 2020 as part of BBC cuts. However, due to priority put on coverage of the COVID-19 pandemic, the BBC suspended the programme earlier than initially planned with the final episode airing on 17 March 2020. Derbyshire has remained as a presenter in the same time slot, instead presenting a standardly structured BBC World News newscast.

== Presenters ==
Years	Presenter	Role
2015–2020	Victoria Derbyshire	Main presenter, Monday–Thursday
2015–2020	Joanna Gosling	Friday (alt) & main relief
2018–2020	Chloe Tilley	Friday presenter (alt)
2018–2020	Annita McVeigh	Newsreader Tuesday–Friday
2019–2020	Carrie Gracie	Newsreader Monday, Relief newsreader
2015–2020	Norman Smith	Relief Presenter, Assistant political editor
2018	Tina Daheley	Relief presenter
2018	Matt Barbet	Relief presenter
2018–2019	Riz Lateef	Relief presenter
2019	Samira Ahmed	Relief presenter
2019	Victoria Fritz	
2015–2019	Julian Worricker	Relief presenter and newsreader
2017	Martine Croxall	Relief presenter and newsreader
2018–2019	Matthew Price	Relief presenter and newsreader
2018	Reeta Chakrabarti	Relief presenter and newsreader
2018–2020	Rebecca Jones	Relief newsreader
2018	Ben Brown	Relief newsreader
2018–2020	Rachel Schofield	Relief newsreader
2018–2019	Carole Walker	Relief newsreader
2015	Naga Munchetty	Relief newsreader
2015	Jane Hill	Relief newsreader
2016–2017	Maxine Mawhinney	Relief newsreader

When Derbyshire was away (on leave, on an assignment, or elsewhere), the titles described the programme as 'with' the stand-in presenter.

=== Reporters/segment presenters ===
- Aaron Heslehurst (business)
- Ore Oduba (sport)
- Katherine Downes (sport)
- Carol Kirkwood (weather)
- Benjamin Zand (also film producer, editor of BBC Pop Up)

== Cancellation ==
The BBC described it as the "centrepiece of domestic daytime TV news," and the initial "digital first" TV show. Of the first ten editions of the Victoria Derbyshire programme, one show in April 2015 attracted only 39,000 viewers and gained a 'zero rating."

The programme was cancelled in January 2020 as part of the cost-cutting in BBC News. On Twitter, Amol Rajan, the BBC's media editor, said the costs were deemed too high for a conventionally watched linear show, but said its "Digital impact was huge. Show was designed to reach audiences the BBC struggles to connect with, and it did - online." The last programme was broadcast on 17 March 2020, itself being moved forward as a result of restrictions imposed by the BBC due to the COVID-19 pandemic.

== Controversies ==
An episode of the Victoria Derbyshire show broadcast on 22 May 2015, featured an interview with Lisa Longstaff from the organisation Women Against Rape. During the broadcast, Longstaff made reference to the case of Eleanor de Freitas, a woman who died of suicide while being prosecuted for allegedly perverting the course of justice by allegedly making a false rape claim. Longstaff twice referred to the alleged victim of the false rape claim as a "rapist" which was not challenged by the interviewer. The BBC later issued an apology for any distress they had caused as a result of the broadcast and made it clear that the person referred to had never been tried or convicted of rape.

On June 28, 2018, the novel Doki Doki Literature Club! was discussed on an episode, two days after 15-year-old Ben Walmsley, a fan of the game from Bury St Edmunds in Suffolk, committed suicide. Due to the suicides of Sayori and Yuri, Derbyshire claimed that Doki Doki Literature Club! is "a risk to children" and that its graphics "are clearly aimed at young people", and then had a 30-minute conversation between two people about the game, Laura Dale from game news website Kotaku and Lorna Fraser of the mental health charity Samaritans, who discussed the game's claim that it is suitable for people over the age of 13. Most of this conversation was about paying attention to the mental health of children and listening to disclaimers.

== Awards ==
In 2015, Derbyshire was nominated for RTS Presenter of the Year along with Zand who was nominated in the Young Talent category which Zand won. Derbyshire won Broadcaster of the Year at the PinkNews Awards in 2015 and 2016. In 2017, the programme won a BAFTA for its coverage of former footballers who had been sexually abused.
