= Dateline London =

- Final title card, used in 2022
- Created by: BBC News
- Presented by: Shaun Ley; Geeta Guru-Murthy; Martine Croxall
- Country of origin: United Kingdom
- Original language: English

Production
- Production locations: Studio E, Broadcasting House
- Editor: Nick Guthrie
- Running time: 30 minutes
- Production company: TV Talk

Original release
- Network: BBC News; BBC World News
- Release: 1996 – 15 October 2022

Dateline London is a weekly BBC News discussion programme. A panel of four leading journalists, lecturers, and foreign correspondents discussed top news stories from an international perspective. The last episode made was on 15 October 2022.

== Production ==
Prior to the COVID-19 pandemic, Dateline London was recorded live on Saturday at 11.30 am on the BBC News Channel and BBC World News. It had four guests in a round-table discussion of the weeks' main stories.

When the pandemic curtailed all in-person activities, only three guests participated in the programme. Two foreign correspondents from other news agencies or papers joined the programme virtually, with an in-studio guest usually being a relevant BBC correspondent with previous background to the stories being covered. In mid-2022, the virtual guests were stopped as they were accommodated in the studio, and on occasion a BBC correspondent would participate. Additionally, the programme moved to being recorded live every Friday at 7:30 pm, with repeats continuing as normal over the weekend. If significant news stories occurred during the day, the programme was able to be recorded earlier or later on the Friday.

In mid-2022, at the same time as axing virtual guests, the BBC announced its decision to axe the programme later that year. The final episode was broadcast on 15 October 2022.

== Hosts ==
Dateline London was first hosted by Charles Wheeler, and subsequently by Gavin Esler. Shaun Ley and Maxine Mawhinney served as stand-in hosts during Esler's tenure.

Esler hosted his final edition on 25 March 2017, and Mawhinney on 8 April 2017. Since 15 April 2017, Dateline London was hosted on rotation by Jane Hill or Shaun Ley, while Carrie Gracie and Tim Willcox provided occasional cover.

Carrie Gracie had presented Dateline London following her return from paid leave in mid-2018. After 33 years with the BBC, Carrie Gracie left in August 2020. Shaun Ley or Geeta Guru-Murthy presented the programme following Gracie's departure. On 21 May 2021, Martine Croxall presented Dateline London for the first time.

As of October 2021, Shaun Ley was the main presenter of Dateline London. Other presenters occasionally seen hosting the show were Martine Croxall, Ben Brown and Geeta Guru-Murthy.

== Regular panelists ==
- Lyse Doucet chief international correspondent and presenter BBC News
- David Aaronovitch is an Orwell Prize winning journalist
- Yasmin Alibhai-Brown is an Orwell Prize winning journalist
- Mina Al-Oraibi is editor-in-chief at The National
- Abdel Bari Atwan of Rai-al-Youm
- Stephanie Baker of Bloomberg
- Stefanie Bolzen of Die Welt
- Henry Chu of Variety
- Janet Daley of The Daily Telegraph
- Alex Deane is a political commentator
- John Fisher Burns is a Pulitzer Prize winning journalist
- Eunice Goes is a Portuguese writer and lecturer
- Michael Goldfarb is a journalist and author
- Johan Hari is a journalist
- Owen Jones is a journalist, author, and commentator
- Mustapha Karkouti is a freelance journalist
- Gregory Katz of Associated Press
- Thomas Kielinger is a Theodor Wolff Prize winning journalist and the London correspondent for Die Welt
- Jeffrey Kofman is an Emmy Award winning journalist and lecturer
- Laura Lynch is a Canadian writer and broadcaster
- Suzanne Lynch of The Irish Times
- Vincent Magombe is a journalist and analyst
- Nesrine Malik is a Sudanese writer
- Maria Margaronis of The Nation
- Iain Martin is a journalist and author
- Jef McAllister is a journalist and lawyer
- Stryker McGuire of Bloomberg
- Brian O'Connell is a journalist and communications advisor
- Annalisa Piras is an Italian writer and film maker
- Agnès Poirier is a journalist, writer, and broadcaster
- Nabila Ramdani is a journalist, writer, and broadcaster
- Steve Richards is a political writer and broadcaster
- Marc Roche of Le Monde
- Jonathan Sacerdoti is a journalist, political commentator and foreign correspondent
- Shahed Sadullah is the former editor of the Pakistani daily The News in London
- Rachel Shabi is a journalist and author
- Ned Temko is a political commentator
- Polly Toynbee is an Orwell Prize winning journalist at The Guardian
- Isabel Hilton, founder of Chinadialogue
- Nazenin Ansari, Iranian exile journalist
- Clive Myrie, BBC News Presenter and foreign correspondent
- Celia Hatton, BBC News Asia Editor and presenter
