= Agnès Poirier =

French anglophile journalist (born 1975)

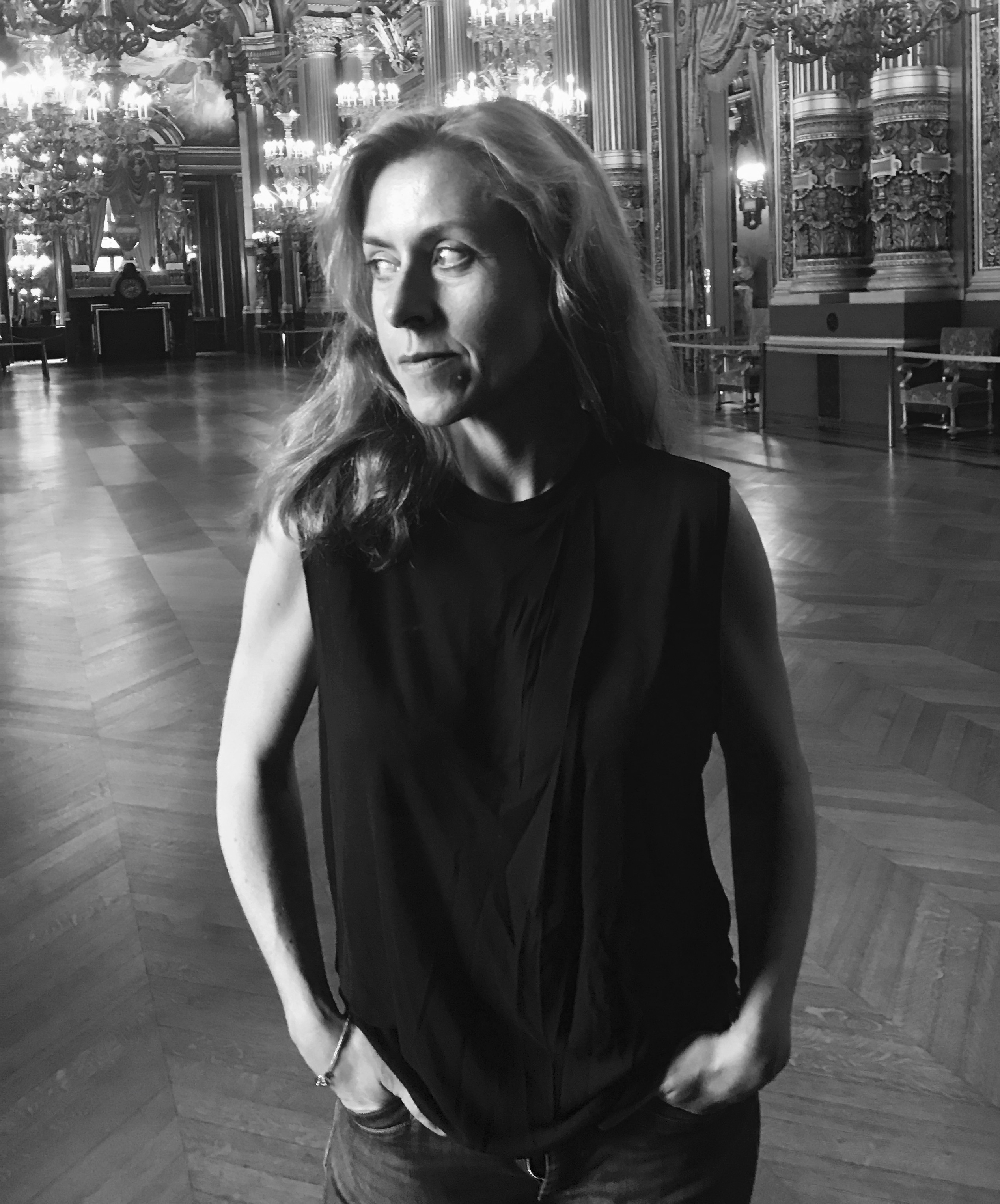
Poirier in 2018

Agnès Catherine Poirier (French: [aɲɛs katʁin pwaʁje]; born 1975) is a French journalist, writer and commentator. She covers the United Kingdom for the French weekly L'Express and frequently contributes to national newspapers in the UK, Europe, and North America. She regularly presents and produces radio programmes for the BBC Radio, BBC World Service, and Radio France, and often appears as a commentator on major television networks internationally. She is the author of several books including Notre Dame: The Soul of France and Left Bank: Art, Passion and the Rebirth of Paris 1940–1950.

== Early and personal life ==
Born in Paris, Poirier has lived and worked in London since the late 1990s, initially as a doctoral student at the London School of Economics, and currently resides between the two cities.

== Career ==
Poirier has written for Le Nouvel Observateur, Le Monde, the Italian L'Espresso and her work in English has featured in The Guardian, The Times, the New Statesman, The New York Times, The Financial Times, The Independent on Sunday. She has been a UK correspondent for Libération, Le Figaro, Marianne, La Vie and L'Express. She is the author of several books in French and in English, translated in a dozen languages.

She has been a regular panel member of the British Broadcasting Corporation's Dateline London public affairs television discussion programme since 2000. She preselects British films for Cannes Film Festival.

== Bibliography ==
- Les nouveaux Anglais : clichés revisités. Paris: Alvik Editions. 2005.
- Touché, A French woman's take on the English, 2006, Weidenfeld & Nicolson
- Le Modèle anglais, une illusion française, 14 September 2006, Alvik Editions, ISBN 2914833539
- Les Pintades à Londres, 2008
- "Cashing in on Céline's anti-semitism". NYR Daily. The New York Review of Books. 12 January 2018.
- Left Bank: Art, Passion and the Rebirth of Paris 1940–1950, 8 March 2018, Bloomsbury Publishing, ISBN 9781408857465
- "Notre-Dame, The Soul of France" 2020, Oneworld Publications (ISBN 9781786077998)

== See also ==
- France-UK relations
