= BBC News at Nine =

Daily news programme on BBC News

- Final title card, used in 2021
- Created by: BBC News
- Presented by: Victoria Derbyshire; Annita McVeigh; Ben Brown
- Theme music composer: David Lowe
- Country of origin: United Kingdom
- Original language: English

Production
- Production locations: Studio E Broadcasting House, London
- Camera setup: Multi-camera
- Running time: 60 minutes

Original release
- Network: BBC News (9 am)
- Release: 18 March 2013 – 31 March 2015
- Network: BBC News (9 am); BBC Two
- Release: 5 November 2018 – 16 April 2023
- Network: BBC One (9 am)
- Release: 21 March – 4 September 2020

Related
- BBC Breakfast; BBC News at One; BBC News at Five; BBC News at Six; BBC News at Ten; BBC Weekend News; World News Today

The BBC News at Nine (styled as BBC News at 9) is a morning news programme. It aired every Sunday to Friday on BBC Two and the BBC News Channel for 60 minutes from 9 am until 10 am. On weekends, it was replaced by a standard edition of BBC World News. The programme was presented by Victoria Derbyshire, Annita McVeigh, and Ben Brown.

Between 2020 and 2023, the programme was no longer branded BBC News at 9, and often simply called BBC News carrying generic BBC News title card (especially during simulcast with BBC World News). The programme was still, however listed as BBC News at 9 on BBC iPlayer.

The programme aired for the final time as a generic bulletin on 16 April 2023, before it got replaced by a TV simulcast of Nicky Campbell's phone-in show from Radio 5 Live the next day.However, has since been replaced by a generic BBC News bulletin.

== Presenters ==
Days	Week 1	Week 2	Week 3	Week 4
Monday	Annita McVeigh	Victoria Derbyshire	Annita McVeigh	Victoria Derbyshire
Tuesday	Annita McVeigh	Victoria Derbyshire	Annita McVeigh	Victoria Derbyshire
Wednesday	Ben Brown	Victoria Derbyshire	Annita McVeigh	Victoria Derbyshire
Thursday	Victoria Derbyshire	Annita McVeigh	Victoria Derbyshire	Annita McVeigh
Friday	Victoria Derbyshire	Ben Brown	Victoria Derbyshire	Ben Brown
Sunday	Lukwesa Burak	Joanna Gosling	Ben Brown	Joanna Gosling

Annita McVeigh, Rebecca Jones and Joanna Gosling appeared as relief presenters. Victoria Derbyshire, Geeta Guru-Murthy, Ben Brown, Ben Thompson, Victoria Valentine, Luxmy Gopal, Ben Boulos and Kasia Madera also appeared as backup relief presenters.

== Evening bulletin ==
An evening (9 p.m.) bulletin also named BBC News at Nine was broadcast, starting in 2013.

The weather and business updates were generally presented from the screen away from the main desk, unless they preceded each other. Sports updates were presented from the BBC Sport Centre at MediaCityUK, Salford. From 30 June 2014, the programme aired an extended Weather for the Week Ahead at 9.55 p.m. This looked at the weather, generally over the British Isles, over the next seven days.

On Fridays from 9:45 p.m., the programme Newswatch used to air. This was moved to a slightly earlier timeslot, 9.30 p.m.-9.45 p.m., and now airs on Friday evenings generally at 8.45 p.m., with overnight repeats on Friday nights/Saturday morning and during the BBC Breakfast programme on Saturday morning, simulcast on BBC One. Newswatch features viewer opinions and criticisms on how BBC News has covered news events during the week. On Friday night, a repeat of The Film Review followed. It was presented by the anchor of the BBC News at Five and a film critic, usually Mark Kermode, from the Studio C (BBC World News' main studio) with the background and lighting changed to resemble a cinema effect. It featured reviews of all the week's main releases.

The evening bulletin was ended on 31 May 2015, and replaced by Outside Source and a new edition of World News Today.
