= Michael Goldfarb =

Michael Goldfarb may refer to:

- Michael Goldfarb (author and journalist) (born 1950), American foreign correspondent, author and broadcaster
- Michael Goldfarb (political writer) (born 1980), American conservative writer for The Weekly Standard
