= Chloe Tilley =

British radio presenter

Chloe Tilley (born in Bingham, Nottinghamshire) is a British radio presenter who co-presented the breakfast programme on Fridays, Saturdays and Sundays on Times Radio.

== Background ==
Tilley was born in Bingham in Nottinghamshire. An English teacher at school made Tilley interested in journalism. She studied broadcast journalism at the University of Leeds.

== Career ==
After leaving university, Tilley worked at BBC Look North for Yorkshire. Her radio career began at Trent FM in Nottingham, where she read the news.

In 2005, Tilley began to sit in for presenters on BBC Radio 5 Live.

As of 2006, Tilley was co-presenting the drivetime show on BBC Radio Newcastle with Jon Harle.

From 2008 until 2017, Tilley presented the one-hour edition of World Have Your Say, a programme on the BBC World Service's English-language service which let listeners have their say on important news events via phone, text message, email and other modes of communication. From 2010 until 2012, Tilley presented the morning (GMT) edition of World Have Your Say. Tilley also presented the television version of World Have Your Say on BBC World News.

As of 2015, Tilley was also presenting BBC Outside Source, a news programme on the BBC World Service's English-language service presented from inside the BBC's newsroom, which had a strong focus on live coverage of major developing news stories. In late 2017, she was still a presenter of the programme.

In 2016, Tilley began presenting some editions of Victoria Derbyshire's weekday morning news and current affairs programme (which was eponymously named Victoria Derbyshire), on BBC Two. She stopped presenting on Victoria Derbyshire in early 2020.

Between 2020 and 2022, Tilley presented some editions of Woman's Hour on BBC Radio 4. She was appearing extensively on BBC Radio 5 Live's Drive programme in late 2019 and/or early 2020.

In 2022, Tilley began co-presenting the Times Radio breakfast programme on Friday mornings and weekend mornings with Calum Macdonald. Tilley's final appearance on the programme was on 28 February 2026.

In 2023, Tilley was criticised after speaking on her Times Radio programme of the courageousness and "incredible ability" of Hamas "to go for Israel in such a way that we have never seen before." This followed the mass slaughter, and hostage-taking, of Israelis by Hamas.

In 2021, Tilley hosted the 2021 Yorkshire Post Excellence in Business Awards in Leeds.

== Personal life ==
In a 2010 blog post, Tilley described herself as an avid fan of sport.
