= Tom Marcus =

Pseudonym for an MI5 officer

Tom Marcus is the pseudonym of a British intelligence agency officer of the Security Service (MI5). Marcus was the author of a memoir and two novels.

Marcus grew up in the north of England and served as a surveillance officer in the Security Service (known as MI5) before leaving the service in 2013 after being diagnosed with PTSD. He was married to a fellow former secret agent and they had two children) together. His true identity has not been disclosed for his own security. Marcus gave an interview to The Victoria Derbyshire Show in 2016 about his experiences foiling Islamic terrorist plots. Marcus said he had to work in a call centre and in a fast food restaurant after he left MI5 as he said his curriculum vitae was seen as inexplicable due to the secret nature of his profession.

His 2017 memoir, Soldier Spy was cleared and approved for publication by MI5.

Marcus has published three novels featuring the character Matt Logan, an MI5 agent. Logan is part of a secret British government agency called Blindeye. Marcus has described his novels as "real and raw [and] based on my own experiences".

== Bibliography ==
=== Memoirs ===
- Soldier Spy. Pan MacMillan. 2017. ISBN 9781405927895.
- I Spy. Pan MacMillan. 2018. ISBN 9781509864119.

=== Novels ===
- Capture or Kill. Pan MacMillan. 2018. ISBN 9781509863587.
- Defend or Die. Pan MacMillan. 2021. ISBN 9781509863648.
- Target and Destroy. Pan MacMillan. 2023. ISBN 9781529065459.
