= Katie Razzall =

British journalist and broadcaster (born 1970)

The Honourable Katie Razzall
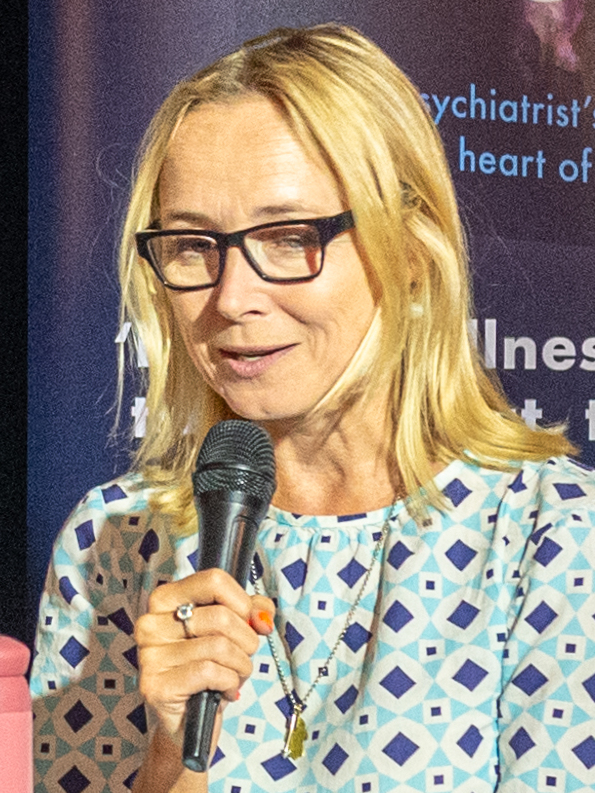
- Razzall in 2023
- Born: Katherine Mary Razzall; 31 October 1970 (age 55); Wandsworth, London, England
- Education: Westminster School
- Alma mater: University of Oxford (BA)
- Occupation: Journalist
- Years active: from 1998
- Employers: BBC; Channel 4; ITN
- Spouse: Oliver Milburn (m. 2004)
- Children: 1
- Father: Tim Razzall, Baron Razzall

Katherine Mary Razzall (born 31 October 1970) is an English journalist and television newsreader. She works for BBC News as its media editor and culture editor, having previously been a Newsnight reporter.

== Education and early life ==
Razzall was born in Wandsworth, London, daughter of the British Liberal Democrat politician and parliamentarian Tim Razzall, Baron Razzall and his first wife, Elizabeth Christina (née Wilkinson); they separated when Katie was about three years old. She was privately educated at Westminster School and the University of Oxford where she studied philosophy and modern languages as an undergraduate student at Pembroke College, Oxford.

== Career ==
Razzall started her career on an ITN traineeship before working for Channel 4 News as a reporter in 2000. After 14 years at Channel 4, Newsnight hired Razzall as a special correspondent in January 2014. In May 2019, Newsnight promoted Razzall to UK editor. She presented Newsnight while standing in for the programme's former main host Emily Maitlis in May 2020 during the scandal over Dominic Cummings. She continues to occasionally act as stand-in presenter on Newsnight.

On 29 July 2021, it was announced that in November of the same year, Razzall would take the place of BBC News' arts editor Will Gompertz in the new role of its culture editor. In January 2023, she succeeded Amol Rajan as the BBC's media editor, whilst retaining her role as the culture editor.

Razzall has for several years presented The Media Show on BBC Radio 4; since 2024 she has co-hosted the programme with Ros Atkins, the BBC's Analysis Editor.

=== Controversies ===
In 2016 Razzall interviewed Omar Badreddin, as part of BBC Newsnight's To Hell and Back: the story of a Syrian family given refuge in the UK which documented the family's 11-month journey from Syria to Newcastle upon Tyne, as part of the Syrian refugee resettlement programme. During the production, Badreddin – then aged 18 – was accused of sexually assaulting a 14-year old girl.

Razzall interviewed the Badreddin family about the trial and commented, "The Syrian men in many ways appeared less sexually experienced than the girls they were supposed to have attacked." Some viewers were unhappy with this editorialization and equated the comment to victim blaming. After being convicted Omar Badreddin was jailed for 18 years, his brother Mohamed for 13 years, and Huzaefa Aleboud for 5.5 years for the rape of a 13-year-old girl abused between August 2018 and April 2019. Another person on trial was given a two-year suspended sentence for a lesser sexual offence.

== Personal life ==
Razzall has been married to the actor Oliver Milburn since 18 December 2004. The couple were honeymooning in Sri Lanka when the 2004 Indian Ocean earthquake and tsunami struck. They have a daughter. Previously, Razzall dated Milburn's friend, the actor Damian Lewis.

Razzall featured on the song "The 2nd Law: Unsustainable" by English rock band Muse, reading out words written by the lead singer, guitarist and lyricist Matt Bellamy.

She has a younger brother, James.

Media offices
Unknown	UK Editor: Newsnight; 2019–present	Incumbent
