= Nick Derbyshire =

Nick Derbyshire may refer to:

- Nick Derbyshire (cricketer) (born 1970), English cricketer
- Nick Derbyshire (architect) (died 2016), chief architect for British Rail
