= Joanna Gosling =

British broadcaster, journalist and author (born 1971)

- Born: Joanna Marie Nussett Gosling; 5 January 1971 (age 55); Aylesbury, Buckinghamshire, England
- Education: Aylesbury High School; University of Birmingham; University of Grenoble
- Occupations: News presenter, broadcast journalist, radio presenter
- Notable credit(s): BBC News; Victoria Derbyshire; Classic FM
- Spouse: Craig Oliver (m. 1996; div. 2014)
- Children: 3

Joanna Marie Nussett Gosling (born 5 January 1971) is an English broadcaster, currently presenting a weekly programme on Classic FM.

Gosling was a newsreader and presenter at BBC News from 1999 to 2023, anchoring a number of major political and royal events. She also presented BBC Two's Victoria Derbyshire current affairs programme on Fridays, between 2015 and 2020.

Gosling previously worked for Sky News, ITN, Central, IRN and started her career in local radio.

== Early life and education ==
Joanna Marie Nussett Gosling was born on 5 January 1971. The eldest of three children, Gosling was raised in Aylesbury, Buckinghamshire. She was educated at Aylesbury High School and the University of Birmingham. Gosling graduated with a second-class degree in French, which included an Erasmus year at the University of Grenoble.

== Early career ==
Gosling decided on a career in broadcast journalism, originally wanting to become a war correspondent. She began her broadcasting career in the 1990s, as a trainee reporter – completing a series of work placements at BBC Radio WM, Fox FM in Oxfordshire and BBC Radio Scotland. A full-time position with Independent Radio News followed – reading bulletins for commercial stations across the UK, including Chris Moyles on Capital Radio. She then transitioned into television – as a freelance reporter for Central, ITN and later Sky News.

== BBC News ==
Gosling joined the BBC in August 1999, as a presenter on BBC News 24. She initially appeared overnight, when the channel was simulcast with BBC One and BBC World. Gosling was quickly promoted to the 9am–1pm morning slot with Ben Geoghegan, followed by Phillip Hayton. She was part of the team which anchored first anniversary coverage of the September 11 attacks in 2002.

In December 2003, Gosling moved to a weekend evening slot on Fridays, Saturdays and Sundays with Chris Lowe. Gosling anchored BBC News 24's overnight 2004 European Parliament election results coverage. She also anchored much of BBC News 24's live and developing 2004 Boxing Day tsunami coverage. In the summer of 2006, Gosling provided holiday cover for BBC Breakfast. Her appearance in a short black dress led to a viral video generating millions of views on YouTube. Gosling presented a BBC News special programme on the Suffolk Murders in December 2006.

Between 2007 and 2013, Gosling presented the 7–10pm slot, alongside Ben Brown, from Monday to Thursday. The first hour included News 24 Tonight, until a BBC News Channel re-brand in April 2008. During this period, Gosling occasionally presented evening and late BBC Weekend News bulletins on BBC One. Following the 2010 eruption of Icelandic volcano Eyjafjallajökull, Gosling was at Heathrow Airport reporting on air travel disruption. After the 2010 general election produced a hung parliament – in the evenings which followed, Gosling anchored much of the BBC's live coverage from Westminster. This included confirmation of a Cameron–Clegg coalition agreement, prior to Gordon Brown resigning as Prime Minister. For the wedding of Prince William and Catherine Middleton in April 2011, Gosling anchored the BBC News Channel's evening coverage.

Gosling returned to daytime in 2013, initially presenting with Ben Brown from 11am–2pm between Monday and Thursday. In April 2013, she broke the news of former UK Prime Minister Margaret Thatcher's death. Gosling was positioned outside Buckingham Palace, during BBC News special rolling coverage of Prince George's birth in July 2013.

From 2015, Gosling frequently presented the BAFTA award-winning Victoria Derbyshire current affairs programme on BBC Two. She was the main Friday and relief presenter, up until the programme's cancellation in 2020. This included extended periods, while Derbyshire was receiving cancer treatment. Notable guests interviewed by Gosling included Richard Gere, Elizabeth Hurley, Ken Loach, Ron Howard and Jessie Ware. An edition presented by Gosling made headlines, for a cervical smear test performed live in the studio.

During her later years at BBC News, Gosling increasingly presented alone in a shortened 11am–1pm weekday slot. Between 2016–20, this was branded BBC Newsroom Live and simulcast on BBC Two. Gosling would occasionally remain in the studio for the BBC News at One, when the main presenter was on location. For a number of UK Government budgets and economic statements, she featured in the BBC's live coverage.

Throughout the UK's withdrawal from the EU, Gosling appeared in a number of BBC News special programmes shown on BBC One. This included anchoring Theresa May calling a snap general election in 2017. At key moments, Gosling occasionally presented live from Downing Street or College Green in Westminster.

Following the June 2017 Finsbury Park terror attack in North London, Gosling presented a BBC News special programme from the scene.

Gosling was part of the BBC's 2019 general election coverage. She was outside Buckingham Palace with royal correspondent Nicholas Witchell, when a victorious Boris Johnson visited Queen Elizabeth II and accepted her invitation to form a government.

After a presenter rota was introduced on the BBC News Channel in April 2021, Gosling appeared less during her usual weekday slot, with the addition of weekends and bank holidays. She was mostly on screen for the first half of each hour, between 9am and 2pm in this extra slot. Unless there was significant breaking news, pre-recorded programmes including Click and The Travel Show completed the hour. The slot also included lunchtime BBC Weekend News and bank holiday BBC News at One bulletins for BBC One.

In September 2022, Gosling interrupted regular BBC One programming, breaking news of Queen Elizabeth II's deteriorating medical condition. Starting BBC News special rolling coverage, where the Queen's death was announced later that afternoon. In a BBC News special programme the following day, Gosling was positioned at Buckingham Palace, interviewing mourners outside the gates.

Gosling was outside 10 Downing Street in October 2022, for the announcement of Rishi Sunak as next leader of the Conservative Party and Prime Minister of the United Kingdom.

Towards the end of Gosling's tenure at BBC News, she adopted a lighter and more relaxed presentation style. This was reflected by a less formal wardrobe and longer hair. Gosling even made headlines herself, when becoming emotional on air several times. After a number of high-profile bloopers, she made a parody video for BBC Radio 1.

In January 2023, Gosling chose to leave the BBC after more than 23 years. She accepted voluntary redundancy, ahead of the UK domestic BBC News Channel and international BBC World News channel merger in April 2023. In an emotional final sign-off, Gosling thanked viewers and colleagues who influenced her career in journalism – allowing her to "give a voice, lend an ear and shine a light".

== Other on-screen appearances ==
Gosling competed on Christmas University Challenge in 2015. She represented the University of Birmingham – on a team with novelist Emma Darwin, BBC weatherman John Hammond and Paralympian Pam Relph. They were eliminated in the first round of the competition, after losing 155–80 against UCL.

In 2021, Gosling was a contestant on Pointless Celebrities. She paired up with former BBC News colleague John Pienaar, playing for Ovarian Cancer Action and Macmillan respectively. They reached the final with a jackpot of £2,500, although failed to produce any 'pointless' answers.

== Post-BBC career ==
From July 2023, Gosling started presenting on UK radio station Classic FM. Her weekly show airs on Sundays between 1pm and 4pm – featuring a mixture of traditional classics and modern film scores.

In September 2023, it was reported that Gosling would be joining the family law firm Irwin Mitchell as a senior associate and mediator, helping couples to resolve disputes without going to court.

== Publications ==
Gosling's first book, Simply Wonderwoman: A survival guide for women with too much to do, was published in October 2011 by Kyle Books. It's a guide for busy working women with children, which was serialised by the Daily Mail.

Her second book was titled Homemade Simple: Stylish, Practical Makes for Living and Giving. Published in September 2013, it features a series of projects to make around the home.

== Business interests and tax disputes ==
Gosling first faced criticism of tax avoidance in 2011, when her former husband Craig Oliver, became Director of Communications for then UK Prime Minister David Cameron. Press reports emerged that Gosling and Oliver founded the company Paya Ltd. Oliver first served as company secretary, relinquishing his role after the negative publicity. Gosling was paid by the BBC via this company as a contractor, remaining a director until her departure in 2023.

In 2016, Gosling became embroiled in a tax dispute with HMRC. She was initially one of around 100 freelance BBC staff, investigated into the taxing of off-payroll working (IR35). The same 'disguised employment' loophole, Gosling previously faced public criticism for exploiting. Gosling, Tim Willcox and David Eades eventually appealed to a High Court tribunal in 2019, owing £920,000 in unpaid tax collectively. They argued the BBC forced them to be freelance contractors, paid via public service companies. This was accepted as fact by the tribunal judges, believing there was an "imbalance of bargaining power". However, it was also ruled "the assumed relationships were ones of employment", meaning the trio were ultimately liable for the disputed tax.

Gosling is an accredited mediator, practising in family and workplace disputes after leaving the BBC.

== Personal life ==
Gosling lives in Hammersmith, West London. She was married to Craig Oliver – a former ITN and BBC News producer, who later became Director of Communications to former UK Prime Minister David Cameron. The marriage produced three daughters, before ending in 2014.

She participated in 'Newsroom's Got Talent' with several BBC colleagues in 2009 and 2010. These fundraisers were in aid of Leonard Cheshire Disability and the Helen & Douglas House hospices.

Gosling is a patron to Persever Productions, a theatre company in the charitable sector for aspiring actors.

== Television ==
Year	Title	Role	Notes
1997–1998	Central News	Reporter/presenter	
1998–1999	Sky News	Reporter	
1999–2023	BBC News Channel	Presenter	Final broadcast: 26 January 2023
2002	Spooks	Herself	Uncredited appearance at the end of S1.E4, as a fictional newsreader
2003	BBC News Special: Oscar Nominations	Presenter	
2006	BBC Breakfast	Presenter	Summer holiday cover
2007	Diana: 10 Years On	Presenter	News archive programme marking the 10th anniversary of the death of Diana, Princess of Wales
2007–2008	News 24 Tonight	Presenter	Alongside Ben Brown, until BBC News Channel re-brand
2008–2011	BBC Weekend News	Presenter	Saturday early evening and late bulletins on BBC One, on rota with other newsreaders
2010	Britain's Economy: Cameron and Clegg Face the Audience	Presenter	Post-debate analysis with Nicholas Owen
2015–2020	Victoria Derbyshire with Joanna Gosling	Presenter	Deputy presenter (Friday) and newsreader
2015	Christmas University Challenge	Contestant	Series 5: UCL v Birmingham
2016–2020	BBC Newsroom Live	Presenter	Main presenter, on rota with other newsreaders
2019–2022	BBC News at One	Presenter	Second studio-based presenter, when main presenter on location and occasional bank holidays
2020–2023	BBC Weekend News	Presenter	Weekend early afternoon bulletins on BBC News and BBC One
2021	Pointless Celebrities	Contestant	Series 14

== Film ==
Year	Title	Role	Notes
2005	Supervolcano	Herself	Reading fictional news item about a volcanic eruption at Yellowstone National Park
2008	Ulvenatten	Herself	Reads fictional news report about a terror attack in Oslo
2015	Spooks: The Greater Good	Herself	Brief appearance, reading a fictional London terror attack story

== Bibliography ==
- Simply Wonderwoman: A survival guide for women with too much to do: Kyle Books (2011): ISBN 0-85783-058-9
- Homemade Simple: Stylish, Practical Makes for Living and Giving: Kyle Books (2013): ISBN 0-85783-100-3
