= World Have Your Say =

- Created by: BBC World News
- Presented by: Chloe Tilley; Ros Atkins (until 2013); Nuala McGovern (relief); Lucy Hockings (relief)
- Country of origin: United Kingdom
- Original language: English

Production
- Producers: Simon Peeks; Richard Pollins; Charlie Humphreys
- Production locations: Studio B, Broadcasting House, London
- Running time: 60 minutes

Original release
- Network: BBC World News
- Release: February 2011 – June 2017

Related
- BBC World News; BBC World News America; Newsday; GMT; Impact; The Hub; Global; Focus on Africa; World News Today; Business Edition; World Business Report

World Have Your Say
- Genre: Current events Discussion; Debate
- Running time: ~50 minutes
- Country of origin: International (United Kingdom origin)
- Language: English
- Home station: BBC World Service
- Syndicates: Public Radio International
- Hosted by: Ros Atkins; Chloe Tilley; Nuala McGovern
- Produced by: Ben Sutherland; Ben Allen; Simon Peeks; Graham Evans
- Senior editor: Mark Sandell
- Recording studio: Broadcasting House, London
- Original release: 2005 – 2017
- Audio format: Monophonic
- Website: World Have Your Say
- Podcast: BBC Radio Podcast

World Have Your Say (WHYS) is an international BBC global discussion show, that was broadcast on BBC World Service every weekday at 16:00 UTC and on BBC World News every Friday at 15:00 UTC.

World Have Your Say won Gold in the 2008 Sony Radio Awards, in the category Listener Participation.

The show described itself as "the BBC News programme where you set the agenda." Typically each edition addressed a question, or number of questions, raised by the users of its blog and Facebook site, as well as emailers to the BBC.

It encouraged callers to talk to each other and directed questions asked by listeners to the guests on the programme, intervening as little as possible to keep the show more of a conversation than a talk show.

The show also occasionally worked as a forum for the BBC World Service's global audience to put questions to a particular guest. Previous guests included Aung San Suu Kyi, Philip Pullman and Thilo Sarrazin.

== History ==
The BBC World Service launched the programme in October 2005, featuring Anu Anand and Steve Richards as presenters and Mark Sandell as editor. Ros Atkins replaced Richards in early 2006 as the main presenter.

Since February 2011 the programme had a weekly television edition on BBC World News on Fridays produced by the same production team.

Topics for discussions were set by listeners, who could email the show prior to it going on air each day, or even call into the studio office. Some of the comments left on the WHYS blog and Facebook site, together with emails, Tweets and SMS text messages, were read on the air. Callers from all over the world were the key part of the programme by calling in and debating the daily topic.

On occasion, the show would leave the studio and go on the road, to discuss subjects from a particular country but often with a global impact. For example, in 2011, they went to Berlin to discuss the legacy of Nazism in Germany, Jakarta to talk about revolution in a Muslim country, and Bangkok to talk about sex tourism.

Most of the time, the topics for the days' show were offered by e-mail. Some stories were suggested by a single person, others by the number of people wanting to talk about it. Increasingly, use was made of the programme's Facebook site as a source of comment on news stories. Sometimes, these were stories from the listeners' point of view. In fact, some of the reporting of current events for the show was done by real world people, most with no journalism experience.

=== Television ===
BBC World News began presenting a version of the programme in 2011 with Ros Atkins as the presenter. The programme, presented on Fridays at 15:00 GMT, encouraged viewer discussion on some of the top stories from the week. Occasionally, correspondents and high-profile individuals close to the issue at hand would join in the conversation. Similarly to the version on radio, the programme heavily utilised social media; especially Twitter and Facebook.

As of late 2013, Chloe Tilley played a more active role as a presenter.
