= Prospect (magazine) =

British monthly current affairs magazine

- Editor: Philip Collins
- Categories: Politics, world affairs, arts and culture
- Frequency: Monthly
- Total circulation: 31,074 (2023)
- First issue: October 1995; 31 years ago
- Company: Prospect Publishing Ltd.
- Country: United Kingdom
- Based in: London, England
- Language: English
- Website: prospectmagazine.co.uk
- ISSN: 1359-5024
- OCLC: 682565489

Prospect is a monthly British general-interest magazine, specialising in politics, economics and current affairs. Topics covered include British and other European, as well as US politics, social issues, art, literature, cinema, science, the media, history, philosophy and psychology. Prospect features a mixture of lengthy analytic articles, first-person reportage, one-page columns and shorter items.

== Background ==
The magazine was launched in October 1995 by David Goodhart, then a senior correspondent for the Financial Times (FT), and chairman Derek Coombs, an ex Conservative Party MP. Goodhart came up with the idea of producing an essay-based monthly general-interest magazine—a form unknown in Britain at that time—while covering German reunification as Bonn correspondent for the FT.

Some prominent intellectuals have featured in Prospect, including economists Joseph Stiglitz, Amartya Sen and Angus Deaton, writers such as Lionel Shriver, Clive James, Toni Morrison and Margaret Atwood, as well as scientists like Martin Rees. Notable features of the magazine include debates between two writers with opposing views, discussions among a series of experts with varying views, an edited transcript of which is published in the magazine, and interviews with political and cultural figures (examples include Orhan Pamuk, Paul Wolfowitz and Hilary Mantel).

Prospect received worldwide attention in October 2005 when it published its list of the world's top 100 public intellectuals, which included Ziauddin Sardar, Noam Chomsky, Umberto Eco, Richard Dawkins, Steven Pinker and Christopher Hitchens. When the magazine asked readers to vote for the top intellectual on the list, Chomsky emerged the winner. Subsequent lists continued to get attention. Dawkins claimed the top spot in 2013. Amartya Sen won in 2014 and Thomas Piketty was the winner in 2015. After a four year absence, the award was revived by Caucher Birkar in 2019.

In 2011, Prospect published the winning short story of the Royal Society of Literature's V. S. Pritchett Memorial Prize, Carys Davies' The Redemption of Galen Pike.

Prospect magazine is published by the Resolution Group.

== Policy positions ==
The magazine features contributions from authors spanning the mainstream political spectrum. It tends to avoid a "line" on specific policy issues, claiming to offer a "contrarian" view and to be an "open minded" magazine. It has published articles debunking the "popular wisdom", on topics ranging from Japan's alleged economic crisis to the Mahdi army in Iraq. However, it has been described as left-leaning by the BBC, and the Prospect contributor Roger Scruton.

In an August 2009 roundtable interview in Prospect, Adair Turner supported the idea of new global taxes on financial transactions, warning that a "swollen" financial sector paying excessive salaries has grown too big for society. Turner's suggestion that a "Tobin tax", named after the economist James Tobin, should be considered for financial transactions drew international attention.

Since 2004, the magazine's founding editor, David Goodhart, has stirred controversy with a series of articles arguing that the increasing diversity of the United Kingdom may weaken the bonds of solidarity on which the welfare state depends. The debate fed into the broader discussions of "Britishness".

== Think Tank Awards ==
Prospect holds the annual Think Tank Awards, which celebrate and reward the works of think tanks on a national and global scale. The awards are supported by Shell. Categories include "Global Think Tank of the Year", "Publication of the Year", "North American Think Tank of the Year", "European Think Tank of the Year" (excluding Britain), 'UK Think Tank of the Year', and many sub-categories just for the UK.

According to the official website, "The awards are judged by a cross-party panel looking for evidence of influence on public policy and on the public discourse. The judges will also consider the quality of research and potential of younger and smaller organisations." The awards have been running since 2001, and have been expanding exponentially to include more global awards for international Think Tanks. The winner of the most recent 2017 Think Tank awards (held at the Institute of Directors on 10 July) was the Joseph Rowntree Foundation, based in the UK, for its "very strong analytical appraisal of the social conditions in Britain".

== List of editors ==
- David Goodhart (1995–2011)
- Bronwen Maddox (2011–2016)
- Tom Clark (2016–2021)
- Alan Rusbridger (2021–2025)
- Philip Collins (2026-present)
