= Ros Atkins =

British journalist

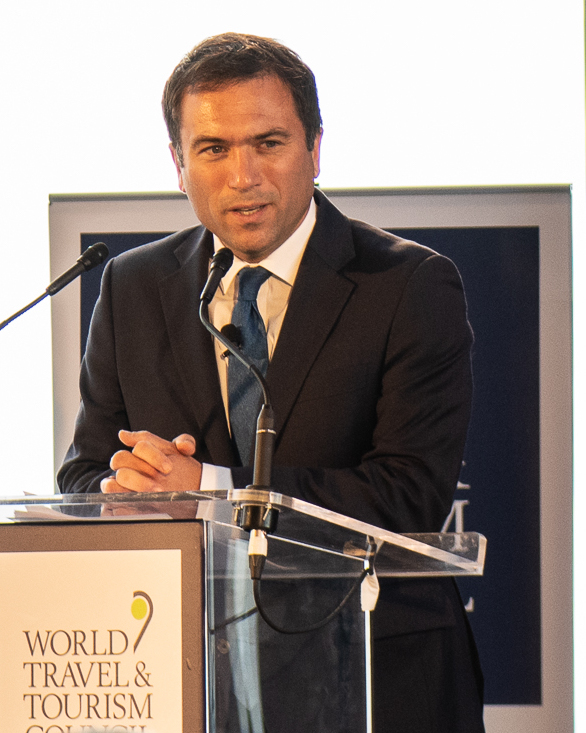
- Atkins in 2019
- Born: Roslyn Atkins; 1974 (age 51–52)
- Education: Truro School; University of Cambridge
- Occupations: Journalist broadcaster
- Notable credit(s): World Have Your Say; Global; Outside Source

Roslyn Atkins (born 1974) is an English journalist and DJ who is analysis editor for the BBC.

He presents Outside Source, Ros Atkins on the week and Ros Atkins on.. on BBC World News and the BBC News Channel. He also presents on rotation The Media Show on BBC Radio 4 and News Channel. He previously hosted World Have Your Say on BBC World News and BBC World Service radio.

== Early life and education ==
Ros Atkins was born in 1974 and grew up in Stithians, Cornwall but also lived in Port of Spain, Trinidad and Tobago and Nassau, Bahamas. He lived in Johannesburg, South Africa, after finishing his studies.

Atkins was privately educated at Truro School, in Truro in Cornwall, and went on to study history at the University of Cambridge where he was an undergraduate student at Jesus College, Cambridge.

== Career ==
Atkins began his career in South Africa where he researched crime prevention and human rights for the Centre for Policy Studies. He wrote for the Sunday Independent in South Africa and worked as a DJ in Johannesburg and at the Oppikoppi festival.

On returning to the UK, Atkins became editor of timeout.com, and contributed to British Airways in-flight radio.

Atkins continued to DJ, setting up a night at the Brixtonian Havana Club called Sharp in Brixton, south London, and appearing at WOMAD and Fruitstock.

=== BBC Radio ===
In 2001, Atkins joined the BBC as a news producer on the Simon Mayo programme on BBC Radio 5 Live. He also presented on Up All Night while at Radio 5 Live. Atkins then joined the BBC World Service. He presented The World Today and The Ticket before joining World Have Your Say in 2005.

While Atkins was the presenter, World Have Your Say won a Sony Gold Award for Listener Participation in 2008 and a Sony Bronze Award for 'Best Speech Programme' in 2012. The Sony Awards have been described as the Oscars of the UK radio industry.

Atkins has hosted coverage of many major stories around the world for BBC News, including both of Barack Obama's election victories and his first inauguration, the swine flu outbreak in Mexico, the football World Cups in Germany and South Africa, the Charles Taylor verdict, the London Olympic Games and the Diamond Jubilee of Elizabeth II celebrations.

Atkins served as a lead presenter for the BBC World Service coverage of the death of Nelson Mandela that won a Radio Academy Gold Award in 2014.

Atkins has hosted television broadcasts including editions of World Have Your Say in Cairo (2011), Boston (2012) and Berlin (2014).

Atkins also hosted live audience radio programmes for BBC World Service in many places including Cleveland, Austin Texas, Los Angeles, Windhoek, Delhi, Mumbai, Kampala, Nairobi, Accra, Abuja, Berlin, Brussels, Tel Aviv, Jakarta, Amsterdam, Copenhagen, Cardiff, Glasgow and many more.

In 2009, Atkins wrote about how he and colleagues became 'social pariahs' after reporting on the swine flu outbreak in Mexico City.

=== Documentaries ===
Atkins has made several documentaries. Living With Tourists explored the impact tourism has had in the three places he grew up (The Bahamas, Trinidad and Tobago and Cornwall).

Sharing It All examined why people are so willing to share very personal experiences online and also on programmes such as World Have Your Say. All That Stands in the Way looked at the root causes of gender inequality through the lives of four teenage girls from Iceland, Jordan, the UK and Lesotho. It was a TV documentary, and a separate radio documentary.

Three follow-up programmes were made - All That Stands in the Way: The Girl, All That Stands in the Way: The Parents and All That Stands in the Way: The Debate, which were made when the girls and their parents were brought together in New York.

In March 2019, Atkins presented a six-part podcast for the BBC exploring his unconventional friendship with American broadcaster Keith Olbermann. In July 2022, Atkins was appointed as Analysis Editor for the BBC and it was announced he would present a new programme on BBC One called Ros Atkins On The Week initially for a four-week pilot.

=== Outside Source ===
In 2013, the BBC announced that Atkins would present a new programme called Outside Source. It would have separate radio and TV editions on the BBC World Service and BBC World News. It launched on BBC World Service radio in 2013, with a launch on BBC World News in early 2014. The BBC announced in early 2015 that the TV edition would be expanded and carried by both BBC World News and BBC News Channel at 9 pm UK time.

Outside Source was known for what the BBC called "state-of-the-art touch-screen technology" which was used to access and illustrated developing news stories. Atkins has talked about sharing the BBC's editorial process with viewers as stories evolve and of making sure that "if you switch the show on, you're guaranteed the immediacy and full range of information on a story that comes from being online".

In March 2015, Atkins co-hosted a special edition of Outside Source with school children from London for BBC School Report. In 2020, Atkins developed with the OS team a series of ten-minute explainers called Ros Atkins On... which are designed to work on TV, radio and online, airing on BBC One during Breakfast, BBC News at Nine and social media. These have covered topics from 2021 Abu Dhabi Grand Prix to Iran protests, Brexit and the UK economy. The videos contain short sparse sentences, many facts and an understated tone.

Atkins hosted the final episode of Outside Source on 30 March 2023.

=== Tourism ===
Atkins has hosted a range of events and seminars in the travel and tourism sector including moderating for World Travel Forum Lucerne, the World Travel and Tourism Council and the World Travel Market. As detailed above, Atkins also made a two-part documentary about the impact tourism has had in the three places in which he grew up.

=== 50:50 Project ===
Atkins is the founder of the 50:50 Project. Its aim is to increase the representation of women in media content, and it began as an experiment on Atkins' programme Outside Source in early 2017. Atkins created a voluntary system of self-monitoring which has since been adopted by hundreds of BBC teams across genres including news, sport, entertainment and factual. The BBC has released data in reports in 2019 and 2020 to demonstrate the impact that 50:50 has had. Writing in April 2020, the BBC's then Director General Tony Hall called the transformation in BBC content delivered by 50:50 "long-term and sustainable".

The 50:50 Project has spread beyond the BBC with 70 organisations in over 20 countries taking part. These include ABC in Australia, Yle in Finland, the Financial Times and Unilever. It has also been covered by The Washington Post and Forbes.

The project has won numerous awards including a European Diversity Award and a Global Equality and Diversity Award. Atkins and 50:50 are also the subject of a business case study produced by London Business School and Harvard Kennedy School. The authors of the study also published an article about 50:50 in the Harvard Business Review.

=== DJing ===
Atkins is also a drum and bass DJ; in June 2024, he made his debut at the Glastonbury Festival on the Stonebridge Bar stage, receiving particular attention for a drum and bass remix of David Lowe's BBC News theme in 2024 and continues to play regularly.

== Personal life ==
Atkins lives in South London with his wife and two daughters.

Media offices
Preceded by New Position	Main Presenter of Outside Source; 2014 – present	Incumbent

Preceded by New Position	BBC News Analysis Editor; 2022 – present	Incumbent
