= Nabila Ramdani =

French journalist

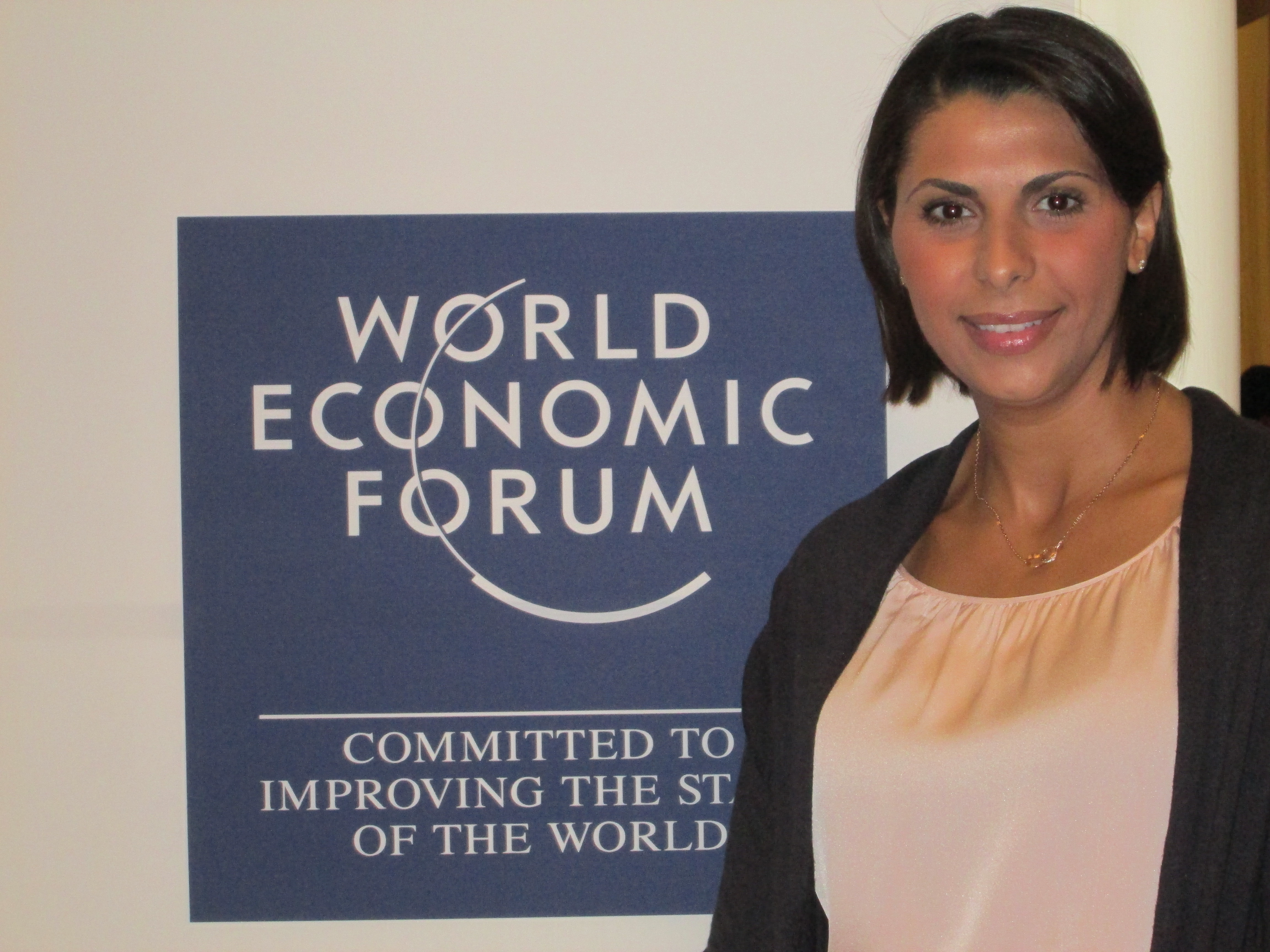
- Nabila Ramdani at the World Economic Forum
- Born: Nabila Ramdani; France
- Occupation: Journalist
- Website: www.nabilaramdani.com

Nabila Ramdani is a French freelance journalist of Algerian descent who specialises in Anglo-French issues, Islamic affairs, and the Arab world.

== Life and work ==
Ramdani has an MPhil in International History from the London School of Economics with a thesis titled "The rise of the Egyptian nationalist movement: the case of the 1919 Revolution, and an MPhil in British and American History and Literature from Paris Diderot University (Paris 7 University).

She has an agrégation in English and has held positions of Lectrice at the University of Oxford (Jesus and Oriel Colleges) and the University of Michigan in Ann Arbor, and of teaching assistant at Paris Diderot.

In December 2000, while a student in Paris, Ramdani launched the "Comité des usagères de la ligne A", a group calling for temporary sex segregation in public transport while safety issues, and especially violence against women, were resolved.

Ramdani began her career in journalism covering the 2007 French presidential elections for a number of UK newspapers, and working as a commentator for the BBC. She has written for The Guardian, London Evening Standard, New Statesman, The Independent and The Observer.

She has written features and news stories for a wide range of other British publications, including The Daily Telegraph, The Sunday Telegraph, Daily Mail, Mail on Sunday, Daily Express and The Sunday Times. Ramdani’s work has also appeared in Middle Eastern newspapers including Arab News, The National, Gulf News, Daily News Egypt, and the Qatari corporate magazine Thinkand. She has contributed to the French publications Le Parisien, Marianne, L'Express and Le Figaro. On August 31, 2020, she published an article in Foreign Policy entitled 'Voltaire Spread Darkness, Not Enlightenment. France Should Stop Worshipping Him' in which she held that Voltaire inspired Hitler.

Ramdani is a commentator for the BBC, BBC Arabic, Al Jazeera, Sky, Channel 4, ITV, CNN, PBS, CBS, Russia Today, and other international broadcast media channels and radio stations. She has worked for French TV and radio stations such as France Télévisions (France 2, France 3 and France 5), Canal Plus, France Inter, Europe 1, RTL, BFM, among others.

In the UK, Ramdani participates in flagship current affairs programmes, including the BBC's Woman's Hour, Today, You and Yours, PM, Newsnight and Dateline London, BBC Arabic's Sabaat Ayyam (Seven Days), Sky News's Press Preview and Boulton & Co, and Al Jazeera's Inside Story.

She is a Fellow on the UN Alliance of Civilisations Programme and she is a regular speaker at Wilton Park, the Doha Debates, Intelligence Squared and universities around the world.

She has worked with the League of Arab States, Islamic Educational, Scientific and Cultural Organization, German Marshall Fund, Open Society Institute, CEDAR Network, Institute for Strategic Dialogue, the Search for Common Ground think tank, and Institut des cultures d'Islam. She is a consultant to the British Council, advising on projects like ‘Our Shared Europe’.

== Awards ==
- 2010: winner of the inaugural European Muslim Woman of Influence (EMWI) Award 2010.
- 2012 Global Thinkers Forum Award for Excellence in Innovation, Amman, Jordan under the patronage of Queen Rania Al Abdullah.
- 2012: 'Young Global Leader 2012' by the World Economic Forum.
