= Henry Chu =

American journalist

Henry Chu is an American journalist currently serving as the deputy news editor for the Los Angeles Times. Prior to that he was the international editor of Variety. Chu had been the LA Times bureau chief in London from 2008-2015. Chu first joined the LA Times in 1990 where he spent 25 years until 2015. He then left LA times for Variety between 2016 and 2019 before returning to LA times as a deputy news editor.

During his initial 25 years with the LA times, Chu served in different positions including as a bureau chief in Beijing, Rio de Janeiro, and New Delhi.

In a PBS NewsHour interview he noted being a reporter of Chinese descent was helpful while on assignment in China, allowing him to "blend into the woodwork in places where a Western Caucasian reporter would immediately stand out."

Chu is one of the regulars who appear frequently on the BBC's Dateline London discussion programme.
