= Shaun Ley =

British journalist and newsreader

- Born: Shaun Dominic Ley; 14 June 1969 (age 56); Lynton, Devon, England
- Education: Ilfracombe College; London School of Economics
- Occupations: Journalist, presenter
- Years active: 1990–present
- Notable credit(s): BBC News; The World at One; The World This Weekend; Dateline London; BBC Weekend News; BBC News at Nine; BBC News at Five

Shaun Dominic Ley (born 14 June 1969) is a British journalist and newsreader for BBC News. He currently appears regularly on a wide range of BBC programmes from HARDTalk to BBC Radio 4's The World Tonight and the BBC World Service's Newshour.

He has presented on the BBC's domestic BBC News and international BBC World News channels, as well as on BBC Weekend News bulletins on BBC One. As of October 2021, he was a regular weekday presenter (20:00–21:00, 22:30–23:00 and 23:30–00:00) on the BBC News channel. He occasionally hosts the daytime news (14:00–17:00), and was the last main presenter of Dateline London before it ended in October 2022.

== Career ==
After a stint as a schoolboy presenter on the short-lived That's Life! Junior in 1980, Ley joined the BBC as a graduate trainee in 1990, and later worked on the regional news programme Points West. He became Political Editor for the South East Cluster; based at BBC Elstree Centre appearing regularly on the then regional news programme for London and the home counties Newsroom South East, as well as on the clusters radio stations BBC GLR 94.9, BBC Three Counties Radio, and BBC Radios Kent, and Essex. The region was divided in two in 2001 to form BBC London and BBC South East Today. He then presented Around Westminster, before becoming a national political correspondent for the BBC in 2001. He began presenting The World This Weekend in 2005.

On 2 February 2023, it was confirmed that Ley and many other presenters of the domestic BBC News Channel would lose their presenting roles as part of the BBC's relaunched news channel.
