= Philip Collins (journalist) =

British finance academic (born 1967)

- Born: Philip James Collins; 16 May 1967 (age 59)
- Education: Bury Grammar School; University of Birmingham; Birkbeck College, London; St John's College, Cambridge
- Occupations: Journalist, academic, banker, speechwriter
- Spouse: Geeta Guru-Murthy (m. 2002)
- Children: 2

Philip James Collins (born 16 May 1967) is a British journalist, academic, banker and speechwriter.

== Education ==
Collins was educated at Bury Grammar School, since 1976 an independent school for boys in the market town of Bury in Greater Manchester, followed by the University of Birmingham, Birkbeck, University of London, and St John's College, Cambridge.

== Career ==
Collins spent several years as an equity strategist in investment banking. He was a political adviser to Frank Field and also worked for the Institute of Education at the University of London, and for the BBC and London Weekend Television.

He was director of the Social Market Foundation before becoming chief speech writer to Tony Blair, and was responsible for writing Blair's last speech as Leader of the Labour Party. In 2007 his was among many names put forward as possible Labour candidates in the constituency of Bolton South East, after the sitting Labour MP Brian Iddon announced he would retire at the 2010 election. Collins did not stand for this or any other seat.

He was among the directors of the Demos think tank from July 2008 to January 2018.

Until August 2020, Collins was a leader writer and columnist for The Times. Private Eye claimed that Collins was "sacked by editor John Witherow for being insufficiently boosterish about the Woosterish Boris Johnson." As he left the newspaper, Collins wrote "Thank you to everyone who has said kind things about the writing I did for The Times and will now do elsewhere. I've always wanted to be thought too left wing but never thought I would achieve it."

He is a visiting fellow at the London School of Economics and an associate editor of Prospect magazine. The Liberal Republic (2009) is a pamphlet Collins wrote with his former colleague, Richard Reeves, who later became Nick Clegg's director of strategy.

He helped Sir Keir Starmer write his 2021 Conference speech.

Collins joined the New Statesman in September 2020 as a columnist and contributing writer.

== Personal life ==
Collins is married to journalist Geeta Guru-Murthy; the couple have two children and live in London.

== Bibliography ==
- Start Again: How We Can Fix Our Broken Politics (2018) ISBN 978-0-00-831264-0
- When They Go Low, We Go High: Speeches that shape the world – and why we need them (2017) ISBN 978-0-00-8235697
- The Men From the Boys: How can childhood best friends end up so far apart? (2002) ISBN 978-0-00-712617-0
