= Oliver Milburn =

British actor

- Born: 25 February 1973 (age 53); Dorset, England
- Education: Dragon School; Eton College
- Occupation: Actor
- Years active: 1992–present
- Spouse: Katie Razzall (m. 2004)
- Children: 2

Oliver Milburn (born 25 February 1973), occasionally known by the name Oz Milburn, is a British actor.

== Early life ==
Milburn was educated at Eton College.

== Career ==
Milburn played Matthew Bannerman in Families and Liam in Green Wing. He has also been in Me Without You, The Browning Version (1994 film), The Bill, Backup, Tess of the D'Urbervilles, David Copperfield (as James Steerforth), Sweet Medicine, Byron, Born and Bred, The Forsyte Saga: To Let, Paul in The Descent, and Bodies. Milburn also joined the cast of Mistresses in 2009. In 2011, he played the role of Edgar Linton in the film adaptation of Emily Brontë's Wuthering Heights. In 2013, he provided the voices of the characters Bartholomew Roberts and John in the video game Assassin's Creed IV: Black Flag.

Milburn was a regular on the first two series of The Royals playing the head of royal security.

=== Other ventures ===
As of 2020, Milburn was a restaurateur and co-owns the London restaurants Kitty Fisher's and Cora Pearl.

== Personal life ==
Milburn is married to the Newsnight reporter and presenter Katie Razzall, daughter of Tim Razzall, Baron Razzall. They have a daughter and a son. The couple were honeymooning in Sri Lanka when the 2004 Boxing Day tsunami struck; Razzall went on to file news reports on the events.
