= BBC Weekend News =

British TV news programme (since 1954)

- Title card used since April 2023
- Created by: BBC News
- Presented by: Ben Brown; Jane Hill; Clive Myrie; Reeta Chakrabarti; Martine Croxall; Kasia Madera
- Theme music composer: David Lowe
- Country of origin: United Kingdom
- Original language: English

Production
- Production locations: BBC Television Centre, London (1969–2013); Broadcasting House, London (2013–present)
- Editor: Paul Royall
- Camera setup: Multi-camera
- Running time: 10–60 minutes
- Production company: BBC News

Original release
- Network: BBC One
- Release: 5 July 1954 – present

Related
- BBC Breakfast; BBC News at One; BBC News at Six; BBC News at Ten

BBC Weekend News is the BBC's national news programme on BBC One at the weekend and bank holidays, although it is often referred to on guides simply as BBC News. It is called BBC Weekend News on all bulletins and carries generic BBC News bulletin titles, apart from the late bulletin on Sunday where it is named BBC News at Ten, only if starting at 10pm exactly, and carries the BBC News at Ten titles. The lunchtime bulletin can also be referred to as BBC News at One, only if starting at 1pm exactly or BBC News at Six if starting at 6pm exactly, abite without branding.

== Format ==
BBC Weekend News airs three times on Saturday and seven times on Sunday, though Sunday mornings take a different format between 5am and 9am. The main three bulletins are presented from Studio B, whereas Sunday morning comes from Studio E in Broadcasting House; they follow a similar format to the weekday bulletins on BBC One, but are shorter in length.

The lunchtime bulletin normally airs at 1:00pm. The programme runs for approximately 10 minutes, and is immediately followed by a weather forecast.

The evening bulletin is usually broadcast at some point between 5:00pm and 7:00pm. It runs for 15 minutes and includes an update from BBC Sport in Salford; the programme is followed by a five-minute regional news bulletin, then a weather forecast.

The late edition airs at varying times on Saturdays, and 10:00pm on Sundays. It also contains an update from BBC Sport. Despite being billed as BBC Weekend News in TV listings, the late Sunday bulletin is usually branded on air as BBC News at Ten. The Sunday late news is followed by a regional bulletin.

Until early 2023, the weekend bulletins were also broadcast on the BBC News channel; this practice ended shortly before the merger of said channel and BBC World News. On occasions of major news relating to the UK, the bulletin may be simulcast on the UK feed of the news channel.

In the summer when Sunday with Laura Kuenssberg is off air and the BBC is not broadcasting the Olympic Games or Commonwealth Games there is an additional hour long bulletin of BBC Weekend News, focused on rolling news and updates from BBC Sport.

== Presenters ==
=== Sunday Breakfast ===
Since October 2026, the programme has been broadcast on Sunday mornings between 5am – 9am, simulcast with the news channel with three thirty minute bulletins on the hour and an hour long bulletin at 8am. These bulletins are simulcast on both the UK and International feeds of the BBC News Channel, with updates from BBC Sport.

The back half hour at 05:30, 06:30 and 07:30, following the headlines, are filled with recorded programming like Unspun World with John Simpson repeated from Wednesday, Talking Business which fills the 05:30 weekday Business Today slot, etc. Weather bulletins air at 25 past and 5 to the hour, and an extended sports bulletin at 08:30.

Though during the football season from around 07:35 the programme moves over to BBC Two to allow a repeat of Match of the Day.

These programmes are also presented by one of the chief presenters.

Years	Presenter	Current Role
2026–present	Lucy Hockings	Alternating main presenter
2026–present	Matthew Amroliwala	Alternating main presenter
2026–present	Maryam Moshiri	Alternating main presenter
2026–present	Christian Fraser	Alternating main presenter
2026–present	Ben Brown	Alternating main presenter
2026–present	Annita McVeigh	Alternating main presenter
2026–present	Geeta Guru-Murthy	Alternating main presenter
2026–present	Sally Bundock	Alternating main presenter
2026–present	Kasia Madera	Alternating main presenter
2026–present	Rajini Vaidyanathan	Alternating main presenter

=== Lunchtime ===
For many years, the lunchtime bulletin was hosted by a presenter from the BBC News Channel; from 2006 to 2015, this was usually Maxine Mawhinney. Until 2001, the Saturday lunchtime news was part of Grandstand. It aired at 1pm although this was flexible if a live event was being shown at 1pm.

Following a reshuffle, BBC News 24 launch presenter Gavin Esler became the main presenter until his departure from the BBC in early 2017. Mawhinney briefly returned to the role until her departure in April 2017 and Shaun Ley took over afterwards.

Since the merger of the BBC News Channel and BBC World News in April 2023, there have been no specific presenters for this bulletin; instead, it is generally presented by whomever hosted the early morning shift on the news channel. However since the beginning of 2025, it has been presented by the presenter who covers 14:00 to 18:00 on the channel. Martine Croxall announced she would share duties with Kasia Madera as the main presenter.

Years	Presenter	Current Role
2017–present	Martine Croxall	Main Presenter (alternate)
2014–present	Kasia Madera	Main Presenter (alternate)
2022–present	Rajini Vaidyanathan	Relief Presenter
2022–present	Lewis Vaughan Jones	Relief Presenter
2022–present	Lucy Grey	Relief Presenter
2022–present	Rich Preston	Relief Presenter
2022–present	Kylie Pentelow	Relief Presenter
2017; 2025–present	Karin Giannone	Relief Presenter
2026–present	Mark Lowen	Relief Presenter

Chief presenters listed above, or Clive Myrie, will front the lunchtime news if editorially significant events or if they are covering the mid-morning or afternoon shift on weekends.

=== Evening ===
Unlike the lunchtime bulletin, the presenter of the two evening bulletins is usually one of the regular faces from weekday bulletins on BBC One or one of the chief presenters (marked with a †).

=== Current presenters ===
Years	Presenter	Current role
2002–present	Jane Hill	Regular presenter
2014–present	Reeta Chakrabarti	Regular presenter
2007–present	Ben Brown†	Regular presenter
2009–present	Clive Myrie†	Regular presenter
2023–present	Katya Adler	Relief presenter
2018–present	Tina Daheley	Relief presenter
2022, 2024–present	Luxmy Gopal	Relief presenter
2024–present	Lucy Hockings†	Relief presenter
2023–present	Maryam Moshiri†	Relief presenter
2002–2006, 2024–present	Sophie Raworth	Relief presenter
2008–2013, 2024–present	Riz Lateef	Relief presenter
2025–present	Christian Fraser†	Relief presenter

=== Former presenters ===
If there is no position before the years of being a presenter, then this newsreader was either a relief presenter or occasional guest stand-in presenter.

- George Alagiah (1999–2002)
- Michael Aspel (Main presenter, 1964–1972)
- Richard Baker (1954–1982)
- Jennie Bond (Main presenter, 1988–1999)
- Fiona Bruce (Main presenter, 1999–2005)
- Michael Buerk (Main presenter, 1988–2003)
- Jill Dando (Main presenter, 1988–1999)
- Robert Dougall (Main presenter, 1964–1973)
- Chris Eakin (2013–2015)
- Huw Edwards (Occasional relief presenter, 1999–2023)
- Gavin Esler (2002, Main presenter, 2015–2017)
- Joanna Gosling (2008–2011)
- Andrew Harvey (Main presenter, 1984–1999)
- Philip Hayton (Main presenter, 1984–1993, 2005)
- John Humphrys (Main presenter, 1981–1993)
- Darren Jordon (2001–2006)
- Kenneth Kendall (1954–1981)
- Sue Lawley (Main presenter, 1983–1988)
- Jan Leeming (Main presenter, 1980–1987)
- Chris Lowe (Main presenter, 1988–1999, 2006–2007)
- Jon Sopel (2003)
- Martyn Lewis (1988–1999)
- Emily Maitlis (2006–2013)
- Maxine Mawhinney (Main presenter, 1999–2017)
- Laurie Mayer (1985–1993)
- Louise Minchin (2006–2012)
- Clarence Mitchell (1999–2005)
- Christopher Morris (1984–1993)
- Angela Rippon (1975–1983)
- John Simpson (1981–1988)
- Peter Sissons (Main presenter, 1993–2009)
- Julia Somerville (2011–2012)
- Edward Stourton (1993–1999)
- Moira Stuart (Main presenter, 1981–1998, 2006)
- Carole Walker (2012–2017)
- Richard Whitmore (Main presenter, 1972–1988)
- Sian Williams (1999–2013)
- Nicholas Witchell (Main presenter, 1981–1999)
- Peter Woods (Main presenter, 1964–1981)
- Nicholas Owen (2007–2018)
- Sophie Long (2010–2013, 2017)
- Rebecca Jones (2015–2017)
- Simon McCoy (2008–2021)
- Tina Daheley (2018–2020)
- Kate Silverton (Main presenter, 2008–2021)
- Joanna Gosling (Main presenter, 1999–2023)
- Mishal Husain (Alternate presenter, 2005–2022)
- Gareth Barlow (2023)

== Sports News ==
During the late programme on each day a round up of the days sports news is presented from the BBC Sport Centre at MediaCityUK, Salford. This is usually presented by one of the BBC News channel sports presenters: Olly Foster, Karthi Gnanasegaram, Lizzie Greenwood-Hughes and Katherine Downes.
