= The Media Show =

BBC radio programme

- Genre: Current affairs, Media
- Running time: 60 mins since 3 April 2024 (previously 28 mins)
- Country of origin: United Kingdom
- Language: English
- Home station: BBC Radio 4
- TV adaptations: BBC News Channel
- Hosted by: Ros Atkins; Katie Razzall
- Produced by: Richard Hooper
- Recording studio: Broadcasting House
- Original release: 1 October 2008 – Present
- No. of episodes: 431(to 23 December 2016)
- Website: www.bbc.co.uk/programmes/b00dv9hq
- Podcast: The Media Show podcast

The Media Show is a weekly British current affairs radio programme and podcast on BBC Radio 4 which examines the current state of the media. First broadcast on 1 October 2008, it is presented by BBC News' analysis editor Ros Atkins and culture & media editor Katie Razzall. Until February 2017, when he died, the show was usually presented by Steve Hewlett, a columnist for The Guardian newspaper and visiting Professor of Journalism and Broadcast policy at the University of Salford. It has also been presented by Amol Rajan, Emma Barnett, Paddy O'Connell, Julian Worricker, Edward Stourton and Andrea Catherwood.

The series is seen by some as a replacement of The Message, a previous BBC Radio 4 series covering the media which was hosted by Jenni Murray and was dropped in 2008. The Media Show is produced by Richard Hooper. Previous producers have included Katy Takatsuki, Paul Waters, Simon Tillotson, Ruth Watts and Dan Hardoon.

== Format ==
The Media Show looks at various different kinds of media, including print, television, radio, online, and telecommunications. It also features discussion of various media areas such as creativity, culture, censorship, business, and ethics. Hewlett said of the programme that: "I hope [it] will be able to lift the lid on many of the current stories within the media, offering genuine insight and intelligence, making this show a must-listen for both those within the industry – but always accessible to a wider audience of those interested in a subject that affects all our lives."

On 14 November 2012, the programme broadcast a one-hour-long special edition, prompted by the controversy that the BBC was undergoing at that time, partly highlighted by the resignation of George Entwistle from his job as Director-General of the BBC.

== Reception ==
Reviews of The Media Show have been mixed. Elisabeth Mahoney in The Guardian wrote that the show covered "a pleasing range of stories" and that it was better than The Message because "it's better to have a BBC outsider hosting [compared to insider Murray], and to place the show right in the middle of the week, allowing some looking back, but also some consideration of the unfolding media stories that will dominate the rest of the week." However, Mahoney criticised the way it dealt with The Russell Brand Show prank telephone calls row saying that, "you'd hope for in-depth analysis and insight. Instead, they left the story until last, and zipped through it."
