= Ben Geoghegan =

British journalist

Ben Geoghegan (/ˈɡeɪɡən/ GAY-gən) is a British journalist working for the BBC. He has covered a wide variety of stories for most BBC News outlets in his previous role as a news correspondent based in the United Kingdom.

== Education ==
Geoghegan was educated at Bradfield College, a boarding independent school in the village of Bradfield in Berkshire, followed by University College London, where he gained a bachelor's degree in psychology, and the London College of Communication, where he obtained a diploma in Broadcast Journalism.

== Life and career ==
Geoghegan has been with the BBC News Channel since it launched as BBC News 24 in 1997, and once presented the 09:00–13:00 shift on weekday mornings, initially alongside Jackie Hardgrave, now with BBC Radio Four, and then with Joanna Gosling, who left the channel in 2023.

Since leaving the shift in 2001, Geoghegan has continued to present occasional relief shifts, and in 2008 also presented some weekend editions of BBC Breakfast. He has also reported extensively for Newsnight. He is currently working as a political correspondent for the BBC.
