= Marc Roche =

Belgian journalist (born 1951)

Marc Roche (born 5 April 1951 in Brussels) is a Belgian journalist who has been the London correspondent for the French national newspaper Le Monde since 1997.

Before Roche became the Le Monde London correspondent, he had had the same role at the French magazine Le Point, since 1985. He also writes for the Belgian Le Soir and the Swiss La Tribune de Genève, and is a regular contributor to several British newspapers, such as The Independent and The Guardian. He is also a regular panelist on BBC News's weekly foreign correspondent discussion programme Dateline London.

He specialises in writing about financial institutions and the British monarchy.

== Finance criticism ==
Marc Roche describes himself as a "liberal who doubts, disappointed by capitalism". Through his experience as a financial reporter for Le Monde he views himself as a connoisseur of Wall Street and the City. Since the 2008 financial crisis he has published three critical books on capitalism's downward slides.

== Bibliography ==
- Elizabeth II, la dernière reine (Elizabeth II, The Last Queen, 2007), about Queen Elizabeth II
- Un ménage à trois (2009), about Prince Charles and his two wives, Diana Spencer and Camilla Parker Bowles
- La banque : Comment Goldman Sachs dirige le monde (The Bank: How Goldman Sachs Rules the World, 2010), about Goldman Sachs
- Le capitalisme hors la loi, Albin Michel, 2011
- Les Banksters : voyage chez mes amis capitalistes, Albin Michel, 2014
