= Stryker McGuire =

Journalist

Stryker McGuire is a journalist working in London. McGuire was a senior editor at Bloomberg Markets, a bi-monthly publication of Bloomberg News, from 2011 to 2021. From October 2009 to March 2011, he was the editor of LSE Research, a magazine published by the London School of Economics and Political Science. Between 1978 and 2009, he was a correspondent, bureau chief, senior editor and chief of correspondents at Newsweek magazine. McGuire was also the founding editor of International Quarterly and an associate at Lombard Street Research, an economics consultancy in the City of London. He is a Fellow of the Royal Society of Arts.

== Education ==
A native of New York City, McGuire graduated from Hamilton College in Clinton, New York, in 1969.

== Journalist and writing ==
Before going to work for Newsweek in 1978, McGuire spent eight years at the now-defunct San Antonio Light, where he won a series of state and national honors while heading the paper’s investigative-reporting team.

He wrote Streets With No Names (Atlantic Monthly Press, 1991), which chronicled his travels through Central America and South America in 1986 to 1987. He was a co-author, with other Newsweek correspondents, of Charlie Company: What Vietnam Did To Us (William Morrow & Co., 1983).

== Newsweek ==
At Newsweek, McGuire served as Los Angeles correspondent (1978–1980), Houston bureau chief (1980–1983), Newsweek International senior editor (1983–1987), and Mexico City bureau chief and Latin America regional editor (1988–1989). Between 1989 and 1993, McGuire was Newsweeks' chief of correspondents, directing the magazine’s reporting assets in the United States and around the world.

He served as West Coast editor for Newsweek from 1993 to 1996, with responsibility for editorial bureaus in Los Angeles and San Francisco. During this time McGuire directed the magazine's award-winning coverage of the O.J. Simpson trial, the magazine's reporting on the fast-expanding entertainment industry and immigration issues, as well as major disasters such as the Southern California brush fires of 1993 and the 1994 Northridge earthquake. He also helped to direct Newsweek's on-the-ground coverage of the Oklahoma City bombing in 1995 and the Waco siege in 1993.

== London bureau chief ==
In August 1996 took the post of Newsweek's London bureau chief, which he held until April 2008. In that time, he covered the rise and fall of Tony Blair in numerous articles, including a dozen cover stories. He wrote extensively about Gordon Brown, and the Conservative Party leader David Cameron.

McGuire's cover story "London Rules," in 1996, is credited as the first piece of journalism to herald the return of "Cool Britannia" (although the piece itself did not use the phrase). His coverage of immigration issues earned the Best Foreign Reporting award from the Foreign Press Association in London in 2000.

As London bureau chief, McGuire covered a number of political, economic, cultural and social developments, from Iberia to Scandinavia to Eastern Europe. His 2000 cover story on Stockholm as the "Internet capital of Europe" was cited in the European press as a groundbreaking piece of journalism. He wrote major articles on the Zara clothing chain in 2001, Microsoft's war on software piracy, Spanish prime ministers José María Aznar and José Luis Rodríguez Zapatero, and German Chancellor Angela Merkel.

He has been a regular television and radio guest in Britain, Europe and the United States; a regular panelist on the BBC TV program Dateline London, and a frequent contributor to such publications as The Guardian, The Observer, the New Statesman and The Spectator.

In December 2009, McGuire gave testimony to the House of Commons Foreign Affairs Committee as part of its inquiry into Global Security: UK-US Relations. The committee published its report, including oral and written evidence, in March 2010.
