= Cool Britannia =

British popular culture in the mid-1990s

Cover of Vanity Fair's March 1997 issue featuring then-couple Liam Gallagher and Patsy Kensit, with the headline "London Swings Again!"

Cool Britannia was a name for the period of increased pride in the culture of the United Kingdom in the mid-to-late 1990s, inspired by Swinging London from 1960s pop culture. This loosely coincided with the latter years of John Major's Conservative government and the 1997 United Kingdom general election, which Tony Blair's New Labour won in a landslide. Britpop and musical acts such as Oasis, Blur, and the Spice Girls were at the forefront. The term—a pun on the title of the British patriotic song "Rule, Britannia!"—reflects renewed optimism in the United Kingdom after the economic struggles of the 1970s and 1980s.

== Origins ==
=== Etymology ===
The phrase "Cool Britannia" was coined in 1967 by the Bonzo Dog Doo Dah Band as the title of the first song on their debut album, Gorilla. The title and its lyrics alluded to the song "Rule, Britannia!": "Cool Britannia, Britannia you are cool/Take a trip!/Britons ever, ever, ever shall be hip".

The phrase "Cool Britannia" reappeared in early 1996 as a registered trademark for one of Ben & Jerry's ice cream flavours which mixed vanilla, strawberries and "fudge-covered shortbread". Channel 4 had a magazine show called "Cool Britannia" in 1996 and 1997.

=== Media use ===
According to American journalist Stryker McGuire, the "Cool Britannia" term started to become prominent in the 1990s as a shorthand metaphor to reflect the British economic rise during the decade. In 1996, McGuire wrote a cover story for Newsweek attributing this rapid economic development to the Thatcherite policies of the 1980s, titled "London Rules". The article proclaimed London—one of the cities most heavily affected by recent economic developments—to be "the coolest city on the planet". Though McGuire's article did not use the phrase "Cool Britannia", he wrote in a 2009 Guardian article, it "launched a thousand 'Cool Britannia' ships."

John Major, Conservative Prime Minister of Britain at the time, used the term in a November 1996 press release, issued by the Department of National Heritage: "Our fashion, music and culture are the envy of our European neighbours. This abundance of talent, together with our rich heritage, makes 'Cool Britannia' an obvious choice for visitors from all over the world." The term was also used by New Labour's Tony Blair, who was elected in 1997 by a landslide. Blair, who during his election campaign, liked to mention that he had been in a rock band called Ugly Rumours while in university, invited high-profile musicians to 10 Downing Street for photo opportunities.

== Characteristics ==
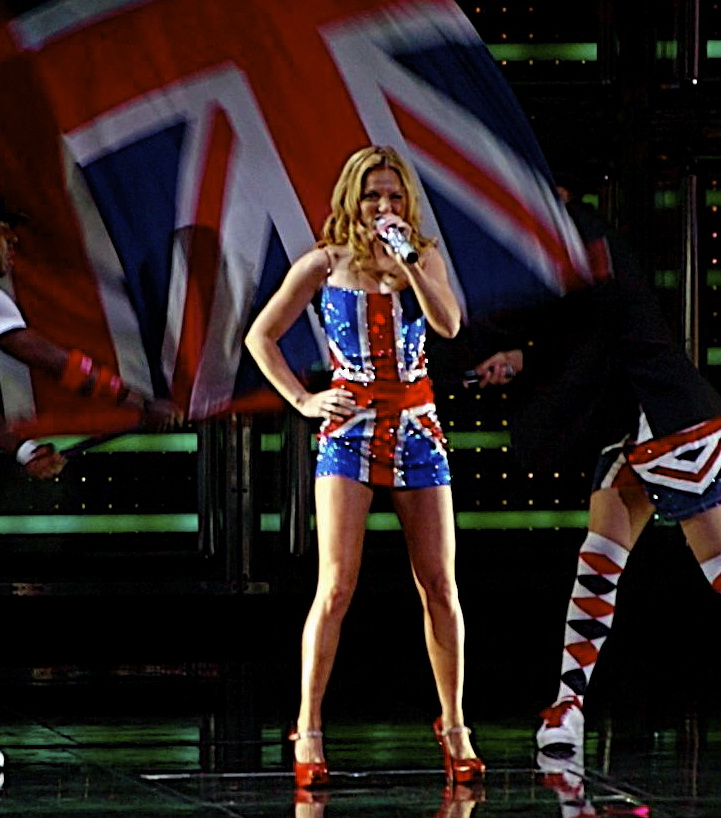
Spice Girls singer Geri Halliwell performing in a Union Jack dress in 2008, a remake of the dress she wore at the 1997 Brit Awards

Time described "Cool Britannia" as the mid-1990s celebration of youth culture in the UK. It referred to the transient fashionable London house scene: clubs included the Ministry of Sound and the underground Megatripolis at Heaven, 1990s bands such as Blur and Oasis, fashion designers, the Young British Artists and magazines. Cool Britannia also described the mood during the mid-1990s Britpop movement, when there was a resurgence of distinctive British rock and pop from bands such as Oasis, Blur, Pulp, Suede, Supergrass, and Elastica. Although they do not fall under the Britpop genre, the girl group the Spice Girls were also part of the movement, with Time calling them "arguably the most recognisable face" of Cool Britannia.

The renewal in British pride was symbolised in imagery such as Noel Gallagher's Union Jack guitar and Geri Halliwell's Union Jack dress, worn at the 1997 Brit Awards. The Euro 1996 football tournament, hosted in England, encouraged a resurgence of patriotism, particularly in England. With his high-profile bouts, world featherweight champion boxer “Prince” Naseem Hamed is also associated with the era, as are alcopops and Lads' Magazines.

The 1994 romantic comedy film Four Weddings and a Funeral, featuring one of the era's biggest stars, Hugh Grant, was an early portent of the new wave of British cinema. Devised by screenwriter Richard Curtis, it set a pattern for British-set romantic comedies, including Sliding Doors (1998) and Notting Hill (1999), the latter also starring Grant. The first Austin Powers film, International Man of Mystery, co-starring Elizabeth Hurley (who was in a high-profile relationship with Grant), was released in 1997, and with its Cool Britannia influenced take on the Swinging London era it instantly included itself in the same 1990s cultural moment. Danny Boyle's 1996 film Trainspotting featured a Britpop-heavy soundtrack.

In March 1997, Vanity Fair published a special edition on Cool Britannia with Liam Gallagher and Patsy Kensit on the cover; the title read "London Swings Again!" Figures in the issues included Alexander McQueen, Damien Hirst, Graham Coxon and the editorial staff of Loaded. Tony Blair's speech at the 1996 Labour party conference drew on the optimism of the Euro 96 football championships – accompanied with the summer’s chart-topping anthem "Three Lions". Alluding to the "thirty years of hurt" lyric in the song (since England last won the World Cup), Blair stated, "Seventeen years of hurt never stopped us dreaming. Labour's coming home". After the Labour party won its landslide, there was even more enthusiasm.

During this time, however, The Economist was commenting that "many people are already sick of the phrase", and senior Labour politicians, such as Foreign Secretary Robin Cook, seemed embarrassed by its usage. Alan McGee voiced his anger with New Labour's policies: "In a way what Labour are doing - even though deep down in their hearts they are trying to do a good thing - is making it worse for musicians. On one hand you've got Tony Blair and Chris Smith making this thing about Cool Britannia, but on the other hand they're taking away the means for the next generation of artists and musicians to go away and create." By 2000 (after the decline of Britpop as a tangible genre), it was being used mainly in a mocking or ironic way. In 2003, George Michael said "Cool Britannia is a load of bollocks to me".

Food and restaurant culture also formed part of the wider Cool Britannia phenomenon. During the 1990s, London experienced a rapid expansion of high-profile "destination restaurants", while chefs increasingly became celebrities in their own right. Marco Pierre White was particularly associated with the period; his Soho restaurant Quo Vadis, opened with artist Damien Hirst, was described by The Independent as opening into the "Cool Britannia" atmosphere of the late 1990s. The growing prominence of chefs such as White and Gordon Ramsay formed part of a broader transformation in London's dining culture, in which restaurants became increasingly associated with fashion, celebrity and contemporary British culture.

Two highlight DVDs, Later... with Jools Holland: Cool Britannia 1 & 2, have appeared since 2004. Similar terms have been used regionally for similar phenomena; in Wales and Scotland, "Cool Cymru" and "Cool Caledonia" have been used.

== See also ==
- British Invasion
- Cool Cymru
- Cool Japan
- Korean Wave
- Taiwanese Wave
