= Ahmad Shawkat =

Iraqi journalist (1951–2003)

- أحمد شوكت
- Born: 1951; Mosul, Iraq
- Died: October 28, 2003 (aged 51–52); Mosul, Iraq
- Cause of death: Assassinated
- Occupations: Professor of medicine, translator, journalist
- Known for: assassinated by Iraqi resistance members

Ahmad Shawkat (Arabic: أحمد شوكت) was an Iraqi journalist shot to death outside his media office in Mosul, on 28 October 2003, following a series of death threats.

Shawkat was the founder and editor of the independent weekly publication Bilah Ittijah ("Without Bias"). He was regarded as an opponent by the Saddam Hussein regime, and had been sent to prison, and tortured, four times. He had spent the seven years prior to the US invasion in Irbil, in Iraqi Kurdistan, in internal exile.

Prior to his short career in journalism, he had served as an anatomy professor at Mosul University, and a Kurdish translator.

Shortly after the USA occupied Iraq, in 2003, WBUR, a PBS station in Boston, broadcast a documentary about Shawkat. After the invasion] Shawkat worked as a translator for Michael Goldfarb, an American journalist. Goldfarb only worked with Shawkat briefly, but would describe them as close friends, due to the intensity of the period. He wrote a book about Shawkat, after his death, entitled Ahmad's War, Ahmad's Peace: Surviving Under Saddam, Dying in the New Iraq, and broadcast several BBC podcasts focused on how Shawkat's family was coping with the US occupation, and the opposition members who assassinated the head of their family.
