= Britain's Economy: Cameron and Clegg Face the Audience =

- Date: 23 June 2010
- Location: BBC Television Centre, Shepherd's Bush, London
- Participants: Nick Robinson (chair); David Cameron; Nick Clegg

Britain's Economy: Cameron and Clegg Face the Audience is a special live political debate programme which was aired on BBC television on the evening of Wednesday 23 June 2010. The programme featured British prime minister David Cameron and his Deputy Nick Clegg facing questions from a specially selected audience following the previous day's emergency budget statement in which Chancellor George Osborne had announced £6 billion worth of cuts in Government spending. It was chaired by Nick Robinson and saw Cameron and Clegg facing questions on the Budget's potential impact. The occasion marked the first joint interview with Cameron and Clegg since forming a coalition government following the 2010 general election the previous month. The programme was aired on the BBC News channel at 7:00pm, then again on BBC Two at 11.25pm. It was also shown on BBC Parliament the following Sunday.

== Background ==
During the election campaign, the Conservatives had promised to hold an emergency budget within fifty days of coming to office. The budget, the first of the Conservative-Liberal Democrat coalition, was presented by Chancellor George Osborne at 12:30pm on 22 June and aimed to reduce the national debt accumulated by the Labour government. Highlights of the budget included a 2.5% increase in VAT to 20% and a large reduction in public spending. Concerns were raised about the impact the VAT raise would have on the less well off, and the effects which would be felt by those working in the public sector.

The live debate was scheduled for the following evening and would be the first time Cameron and Clegg had conducted a joint interview since forming the coalition government in May. The studio audience for the programme was made up of 20 individuals, who were specially selected to represent a cross-section of society. Among those present were businessmen, public sector workers, self-employed people and union representatives.

== The debate ==
The debate was first aired at 7:00pm on the BBC News Channel and chaired by BBC political editor Nick Robinson, who introduced Cameron and Clegg then took questions from members of the audience.

One of the main issues discussed was the planned cuts to public spending. David Cameron faced questions from public sector workers who were angry about a two-year pay freeze for those earning more than £21,000 per year, arguing that it amounted to a real-terms cut in wages. Cameron admitted that this was effectively the case because of inflation.

The debate itself lasted for 30 minutes, after which BBC News presenters Nicholas Owen and Joanna Gosling presented a 20-minute segment analysing the debate and discussing some of the issues that had been raised. The programme was repeated on BBC Two later that evening, at 11:25pm, then again on BBC Parliament on Sunday 27 June.
