= BBC Pop Up =

- Genre: News and current affairs
- Created by: BBC News
- Presented by: Benjamin Zand
- Country of origin: United Kingdom
- Original language: English

Production
- Producer: BBC News
- Production locations: Mobile Bureau based out of Broadcasting House, London
- Editor: Benjamin Zand
- Running time: 24 minutes

Original release
- Network: BBC News, BBC World News
- Release: September 2014 – present

BBC Pop Up is the BBC's mobile bureau that crowdsources story ideas from its audience. It consists of a team of video journalists that create documentaries in different countries. They hold town-hall meetings and teach university classes and crowdsource their stories. The bureau was created in 2014 by the BBC's Matt Danzico and Benjamin Zand and has since visited the United States, Canada, Kenya, Russia and India. The current Editor and Head of BBC Pop Up is Benjamin Zand.

The stories covered by BBC Pop Up have been wide-ranging, from current affairs, to travel to breaking news. The programme airs on BBC News and BBC World News as well as the BBC website. For each destination it makes short online documentaries as well as one 24-minute documentary. Each video is produced, filmed and edited by the video journalists working on the team. The bureau has a team of about six people and is aided by the BBC's language service employees on embarking to a new destination. It doesn't have traditional reporters or presenters and attempts to reach a new, younger demographic on BBC News and BBC World News.

== History ==
In 2014 the bureau was created. The same year it travelled to the United States for 7 months, visiting 6 different states for a month at a time. In each location the team held town-hall meetings with local residents, asking them what stories they wanted to cover. The team then took these ideas and made documentaries from them. BBC Pop Up visited, Boulder, Colorado, Pittsburgh, Pennsylvania, Baton Rouge, Louisiana, Sioux Falls, South Dakota, Tucson, Arizona and Tacoma, Washington making short films and documentaries. In 2015 the team visited Canada and Kenya, and in 2016 the team has visited India and Russia.

== Controversies ==
In 2015 BBC Pop Up caused controversy in India for a question it asked, "Should India erase its snake charming culture to embrace modernity?". This offended many Indian Twitter users. Amid the backlash from Twitter users, BBC Pop Up issued a clarification and said no offence was meant. The practice of snake-charming was outlawed by the government in 2003.

== Awards ==
In 2015 BBC Pop Up was nominated for the "Best Use of Crowd Sourcing or Citizen Journalism" award at The Drum Online Media Awards.
