= Michael Goldfarb (author and journalist) =

American author, journalist and broadcaster

- Born: September 20, 1950 (age 75); New York City, U.S.
- Education: Antioch College
- Occupation: journalist
- Writing career
- Notable awards: Sony Award, Edward R. Murrow Award , Lowell Thomas Award

Michael Goldfarb (born September 20, 1950) is an American author, journalist, and broadcaster based in London since 1985. In the United States, he worked for NPR from 1990 to 2005.

== Early life and career ==
Goldfarb was born in New York City and grew up in suburban Philadelphia. Upon graduating from Antioch College, he returned to New York to work as an actor. Under the name Michael Govan he appeared in productions at Long Wharf Theatre and Arena Stage. In 1984-85 he was a founding member of the Pearl Theatre Company in Manhattan.

== Journalism ==
In November 1985, Goldfarb moved to London to pursue a career in journalism. He has reported from 25 countries on five continents.

He reported on the arts for British and American newspapers, particularly The Guardian and Newsday. He became a critic for BBC Radio 4 and this work led him into broadcast journalism with National Public Radio (NPR).

From 1990 to 1998, Goldfarb worked for NPR and from 1996 to 1998 he was its London Bureau Chief. He covered British politics, the Royal Family and the five-year-long peace process in Northern Ireland. He also reported from Bosnia and Iraq. Throughout this period he worked with the BBC and in 1994 won British radio's highest honor, the Sony Award, for his essays on the American Midwest, titled Homeward Bound.

In 1999, he was a fellow at the Joan Shorenstein Center on the Press, Politics and Public Policy at Harvard Kennedy School.

In 2000, he joined the Boston NPR affiliate WBUR, as Senior Correspondent for the documentary series "Inside Out". Goldfarb's programs won numerous awards including the DuPont-Columbia award for Surviving Torture: Inside Out; the RTNDA Edward R. Murrow Award for Ahmad's War: Inside Out; and the Overseas Press Club's Lowell Thomas Award for British Jihad: Inside Out. However, in 2005 he was suddenly made redundant and forced to return to freelance work.

In 2016, he launched the FRDH podcast. He frames his storytelling through the idea that journalism is the First Rough Draft of History and draws on the history he has reported and lived and written about.

He continues to make documentaries for BBC Radio 3, Radio 4, the World Service and Radio 5 and is a regular panelist on the BBC News programme Dateline London. He writes op-eds for The New York Times and contributes occasionally to The Guardian.

== Books ==
While covering the Iraq War as an unembedded reporter in Iraqi Kurdistan, Goldfarb worked closely with the Iraqi newspaper editor Ahmad Shawkat. Following Shawkat's assassination in October 2003, Goldfarb wrote the story of his friend's life, which was published in 2005. Ahmad's War, Ahmad's Peace: Surviving Under Saddam, Dying in the New Iraq was named a New York Times Notable Book of 2005.

In 2009, Goldfarb published his next book: Emancipation: How Liberating Europe's Jews From the Ghetto Led to Revolution and Renaissance. It is a popular history of how Jews and European society were changed by the opening of the ghettos during the era of Jewish emancipation, which began during the French Revolution.

== Works ==
- Ahmad's War, Ahmad's Peace: Surviving Under Saddam, Dying in the New Iraq New York: Carroll & Graf, 2006. ISBN 0786715154, OCLC 846014786
- Emancipation: How Liberating Europe's Jews From the Ghetto Led to Revolution and Renaissance New York: Simon & Schuster, 2009. ISBN 9781416547969, OCLC 901720277
