= Nick Derbyshire (cricketer) =

English cricketer

Nicholas Alexander Derbyshire (born 11 September 1970) is a former English first-class cricketer who played for Essex and Lancashire between 1994 and 1996. He appeared in only five County Championship matches, scoring 52 runs with a best of 17 and taking five wickets at a bowling average of over 60.00, and a limited overs game in which he did not bat or bowl. He enjoyed a far more prolific career in his county Second XI teams, playing up from Lancashire League cricket's Ramsbottom in 1987 to the Lancashire Second XI from 1989 until 1994, and then with Essex through to 1996. His sister Victoria is a BBC journalist and broadcaster.
