= Victoria Derbyshire =

British broadcaster (born 1968)

- Derbyshire in 2026
- Born: Victoria Antoinette Derbyshire; 2 October 1968 (age 58); Bury, Lancashire, England
- Education: Bury Grammar School for Girls; University of Liverpool (BA)
- Occupations: Presenter, journalist, newsreader
- Years active: 1993–present
- Employer: BBC
- Television: BBC News at Nine; BBC News at One; BBC News at Five; BBC World News; BBC News; The Victoria Derbyshire Show; Newsnight; BBC Weekend News; Central Weekend
- Spouse: Mark Sandell (m. 2018)
- Children: 2
- Relatives: Nick Derbyshire (brother)

Victoria Antoinette Derbyshire (born 2 October 1968) is a British journalist and broadcaster. Her eponymous current affairs and debate programme was broadcast on BBC Two and the BBC News channel from 2015 until March 2020. She currently presents Newsnight and has also presented Panorama for BBC Television, and the weekday morning news, current affairs and interview programme on BBC Radio 5 Live.

Derbyshire was one of eight women to appear in ITV's The Real Full Monty: Ladies Night, an entertainment documentary to raise awareness of breast cancer.

== Early life ==
Derbyshire was born 2 October 1968 at Fairfield General Hospital in Bury, Lancashire, to Pauline and Anthony Derbyshire, but moved to Littleborough as a child. She attended Bury Grammar School for Girls, an independent school, before studying English language and literature at the University of Liverpool. Afterwards, she attended a postgraduate diploma course in radio and TV journalism at Preston Polytechnic (now the University of Lancashire). She has said that her father Anthony physically abused her, her mother, and her younger brother and sister. Derbyshire's mother eventually walked out, leaving with the three children; Victoria was 16 and never saw her father again. She talked about these events during an edition of the BBC's Panorama which she presented on domestic abuse during the COVID-19 lockdown in August 2020. When she was 17, she had a summer job at a furniture factory, which she has described as the worst job in her life.

== Career ==
=== Radio ===
Derbyshire worked as a reporter for BBC CWR and later worked for BBC GMR Radio. From the latter, she joined BBC Radio 5 Live in 1998, at first deputizing for Jane Garvey on the breakfast show, and later as the regular co-presenter with Julian Worricker when Garvey moved on. The programme won Gold Sony Awards in 1998 and 2002. In January 2003, Worricker left the breakfast show, and Derbyshire was partnered by Nicky Campbell. After being on maternity leave, she took over the morning news programme in August 2004.

In September 2010, she interviewed her own BBC Radio 5 Live superior about why he was not moving to MediaCityUK in Salford when the station moved in autumn 2011. Describing the interview, The Guardian said: "Derbyshire's grilling of the station's controller Adrian Van Klaveren made Jeremy Paxman's infamous interview with Mark Thompson look like a vicar's tea party." Derbyshire did not move to Salford and often presented from London. In the first three months in MediaCity she had spent only two weeks broadcasting from Salford.

=== Television ===
Derbyshire has worked on television news and political programmes including This Week, an interview series, Victoria Derbyshire Interviews.., on the BBC News channel, and Watchdog, as well as Panorama. She hosted a sports chat show on Channel 4 on Saturday mornings called SportsTalk. Derbyshire also co-presented the last episode of Central Weekend Live in 2001.

In October 2011, she made her debut on Have I Got News for You. In autumn 2013, under the new editorship of Ian Katz, Derbyshire began presenting Newsnight, while continuing to present her daily 5 Live programme. Her final Radio 5 Live show was broadcast on 5 September 2014.

The Victoria Derbyshire current affairs TV programme was her idea; she suggested it to James Harding, then head of BBC News, who commissioned it three days later. It was first broadcast on 7 April 2015 on BBC Two and the BBC News channel. The programme was cancelled in January 2020; the BBC said that the cost was too high and it did not attract young and diverse audiences. She was not informed of the decision before the story appeared in The Times. The last programme was broadcast in March 2020. Since then, Derbyshire has presented BBC News at 9 9am-11am on BBC Two, BBC News Channel and BBC World News. She appeared on screen during a Coronavirus lockdown with the telephone number of the National Domestic Abuse hotline written on her hand, to raise awareness of the plight of people that were suffering during the first lockdown due to having to isolate with abusive partners.

In 2019, Derbyshire was one of six candidates who auditioned to replace David Dimbleby as the regular host of Question Time, but was not successful.

From September 2022, Derbyshire became joint lead presenter with Kirsty Wark of BBC's Newsnight.

On November 2026, in Newsnight, she faced backlash from journalists for her position on Israel in an interview with Senator Bernie Sanders. When Sanders described Israel as genocidal and called for the end of military aid to it, Derbyshire echoed the Israeli position and moved on to the 2026 midterm elections.

== Awards ==
In 2009, she won the Nick Clarke Award for her interview with a man accused and then cleared of date rape.

She was named PinkNews Broadcaster of the Year in October 2015 and 2016. In January 2016 and January 2017, she was nominated for RTS Network Presenter of the Year.

== Personal life ==
=== Family and relationships ===
Derbyshire met Mark Sandell at Radio 5 Live and had an affair with him while he was married to fellow 5 Live presenter Fi Glover. After being together for 17 years, Derbyshire and Sandell married on 21 July 2018; the couple have two sons and she has a stepdaughter from Sandell's first marriage. They live in Staines-upon-Thames, Surrey. Her younger brother, Nick Derbyshire, was a county cricketer for Essex and Lancashire between 1994 and 1996. She also has a younger sister, Alex, who is a television producer at Good Morning Britain.

During the COVID-19 pandemic in 2020, Derbyshire told the Radio Times she would break the rule of six for Christmas to be with her family of seven. She justified her public comment by stating that "everyone else would be doing it". However, she later apologised for her comments.

=== Health ===
In August 2015, Derbyshire announced on Twitter that she had been diagnosed with breast cancer and would be having a mastectomy, but would continue to present her programme as often as possible during treatment. She recorded video diaries about her cancer treatment, from her mastectomy through chemotherapy and radiotherapy, which went viral and were viewed millions of times.

In 2018, she took part in an ITV programme, The Real Full Monty: Ladies' Night, in which she and seven other women affected by breast cancer encouraged women to check their bodies for signs of the disease.
