= Les Pintades =

French travel guide series by Layla Demay and Laure Watrin

- Founded: 2004
- Founder: Layla Demay and Laure Watrin
- Country of origin: France
- Distribution: France, Belgium, Hong Kong, Quebec, South Korea, Taiwan,
- Official website: www.lespintades.com

Les Pintades is a French thematic travel guide book series targeted towards women. It was created by Layla Demay and Laure Watrin two French journalists. It is currently published by Hachette subsidiary Calmann-Levy.

The series began in 2004 with the publication of Pintades in New York book (Les Pintades à New York). Les Pintades has expanded to include 9 guidebooks. As per the website www.edistat.com, more than 150.000 books have been sold since Les Pintades inception.

Les Pintades also produced a travel documentary series for French paid channel Canal+.

On the Internet, Les Pintades are blogging about travel.

== The concept and its origins ==
In 2004, Layla Demay and Laure Watrin launched the book series Les Pintades. Each book, half travel guide, half anthropological essay, provides hundreds of addresses, as well as chronicles about trends and lifestyles.

== The Book series ==
- Pintades in New York (Les Pintades à New York)
- New York for Pintades (Le New York des Pintades)
- Pintades in London (Les Pintades à Londres)
- Pintades in Teheran (Les Pintades à Téhéran)
- Pintades in Paris (Une vie de Pintade à Paris)
- Pintades in Beyrouth (Une vie de Pintade à Beyrouth
- Pintades cook book (Les Pintades passent à la casserole)
- Pintade in Berlin (Une vie de Pintade à Berlin)
- Pintades in Madrid (Une vie de Pintade à Madrid)
- Pintades in Moscou (Une vie de Pintade à Moscou)

== The documentary series ==
In 2007, Layla Demay and Laure Watrin joined le Club des Nouveaux Explorateurs, a travel documentary series on Canal+ French TV channel. The two journalists were the host of the series. Each episode is dedicated to a city.

- Pintades in London (Les Pintades à Londres), presented by Maïtena Biraben for the TV show Les Nouveaux Explorateurs. Directed by Stéphane Carrel, authors/hosts Layla Demay and Laure Watrin. Producer: Capa TV[8]. Length : 28'50. Date : 2007.
- Pintades in Rio (Les Pintades à Rio), presented by Maïtena Biraben for the TV show Les Nouveaux Explorateurs. Directed by Stéphane Carrel, authors/hosts Layla Demay and Laure Watrin. Producer: CapaTV[10]. Length: 53'31. Date: 2008.
- Pintades in New York (Les Pintades à New York), presented by Diego Buñuel for the TV show Les Nouveaux Explorateurs.Directed by Jean-Marie Barrère, authors/hosts Layla Demay and Laure Watrin. Producer: CapaTV[12]. Length: 51'49. Date: 2008.
