= Chris Eakin =

BBC newsreader

Chris Eakin is a journalist who was a newsreader on the BBC's 24-hour rolling news channel, BBC News, and a relief presenter on BBC News at One at weekends. He was one of the channel's launch presenters in 1997, and is a published author. He left the BBC on 28 May 2015.

== Early life ==
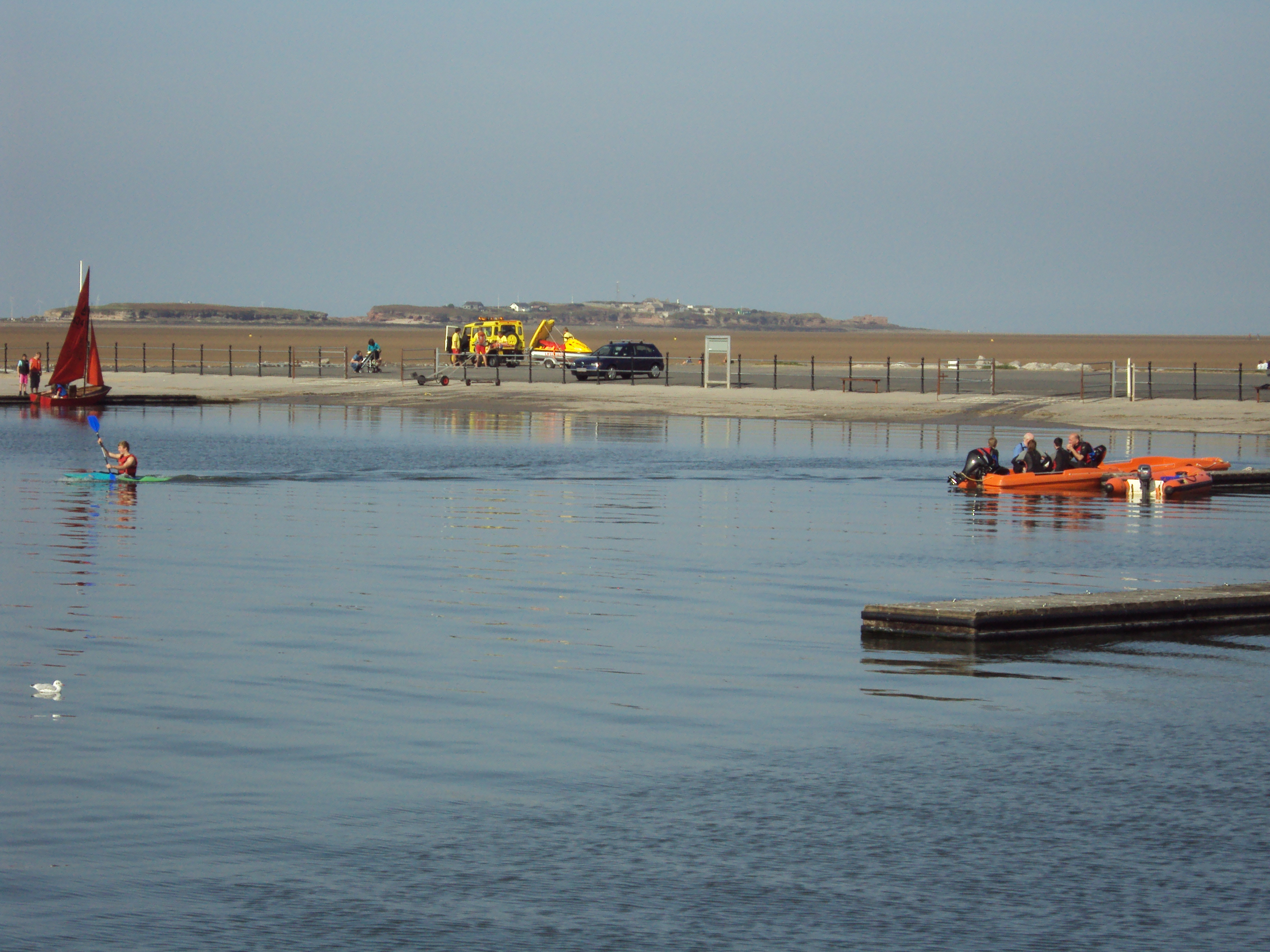
West Kirby Marine Lake

Eakin was born in Northern Ireland and lived at Helen's Bay in County Down, then briefly moved to Spain. His father was a civil engineer. He moved to Heswall when he was 12. He learned to sail with the Fourth Heswall Sea Scouts, sailing at the West Kirby Marine Lake. He left Calday Grange Grammar School in 1979, which he attended with his two brothers, Michael and Clive.

== Career ==
From 1979 to 1983 he was at Wirral News. From 1983 to 1985, he was a freelance journalist in Cheshire. From 1985 to 1989 he was at the Liverpool Daily Post where he won North West Reporter of the Year. From 1989 to 1990 he worked at Central TV as a journalist. From 1990 to 1997 he was a reporter for Look North at Newcastle upon Tyne. He twice won regional journalist of the year.

=== BBC News ===
Eakin was most recently a presenter on BBC News. He has anchored outside news broadcasts from locations including Belgrade, Belfast, Beirut, Buckingham Palace, Tavistock Square in London and numerous UK floods including in Cockermouth, Tewkesbury and Boscastle, Cornwall. He was the main on-site anchor for BBC News after the Glasgow Airport terror attack in 2007. Eakin left the BBC on 28 May 2015 with his final show running from 11 am until 2pm.

=== Publishing ===
Eakin's book A Race Too Far describes the 1968 sailing race to be the first person to sail non-stop round the world single-handed.

== Personal life ==
Eakin is a qualified RYA Yachtmaster Offshore. He lives in London with his wife, Deborah, who is a GP. His older brother Michael is Chief Executive of the Royal Liverpool Philharmonic, and his younger brother Clive works in BBC local radio in Warwickshire.
