= Annita McVeigh =

British journalist and news presenter

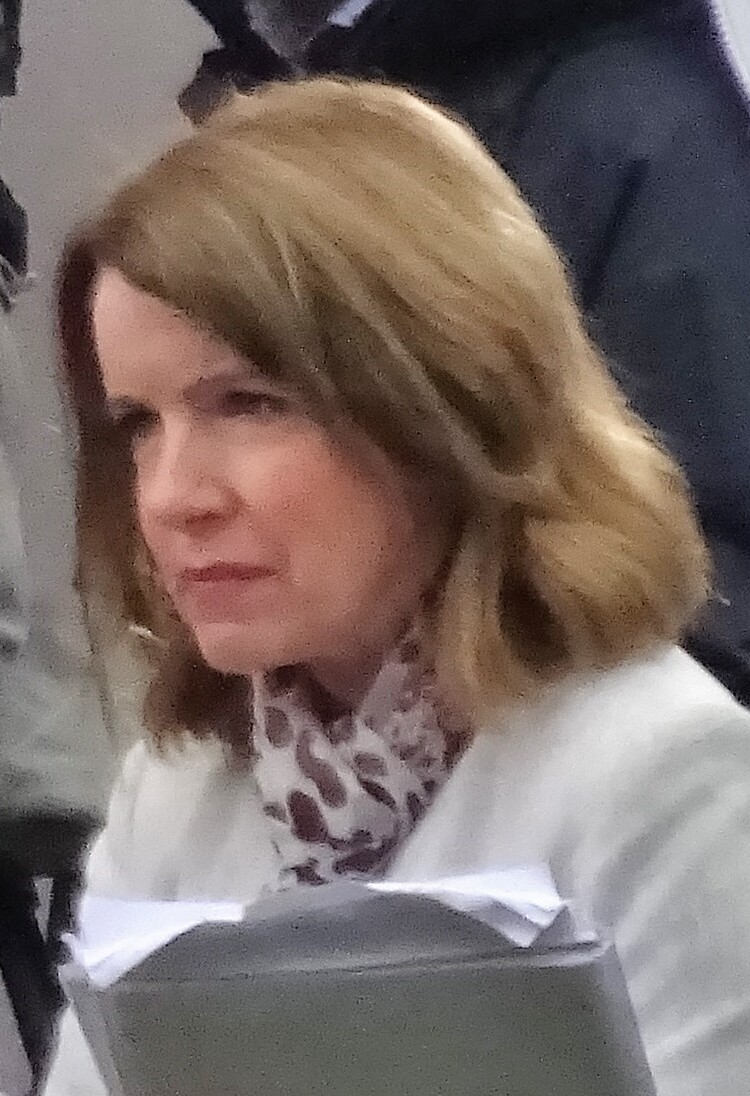
McVeigh in 2018

Annita McVeigh is a Northern Irish journalist and news presenter, working for BBC News.

== Background ==
An only child, McVeigh was raised on a farm on the outskirts of Armagh, and went to school in Dungannon. She graduated with a BA (Hons) in Politics from Queen's University Belfast in 1991.

== Career ==
McVeigh's career in journalism began at the Ulster Gazette and Tyrone Courier. In the late 1990s she began working for the BBC, as a journalist at BBC Newsline.

As of 2002, McVeigh was the Ireland correspondent for BBC News, also covering Northern Ireland.

In 2003, McVeigh co-presented live coverage on the television channel BBC World of the unfolding events in Iraq.

In 2004, McVeigh was a Special Correspondent at BBC News.

In 2006, she began presenting on the BBC News channel. She presented alongside Chris Lowe between 7pm and 10pm on Friday evenings and 7pm and midnight on weekend evenings until Lowe retired in January 2009; during her maternity leave from this role, Sophie Long presented. In 2016 and 2017, McVeigh presented BBC News Specials covering terrorist attacks.

From 2009 to 2013, McVeigh presented between 6:30pm and 9pm on weekday evenings on the channel.

From 2016 to 2020, McVeigh presented BBC Newsroom Live on the BBC News channel between 11am and 1pm on some weekdays. From 2021 to 2023, McVeigh presented BBC Weekend News, in addition to her other presenting work at the BBC.

In 2024, McVeigh, Kasia Madera, Karin Giannone and Martine Croxall, all high-profile BBC journalists, all began an employment tribunal claim against the BBC, alleging age discrimination, sex discrimination and unequal pay. However, their claim was subsequently denied, and they then subsequently appealed.

== Personal life ==
McVeigh married BBC manager Martin Read, from Hartlepool, County Durham in 2005. The couple have two children and live in Watford, Hertfordshire.
