= Martine Croxall =

British journalist and news presenter

Martine Croxall FRGS
- Born: Martine Sarah Croxall; 23 February 1969 (age 57); Stoke Golding, Leicestershire, England
- Education: Bablake School; University of Leeds
- Occupations: Journalist, news presenter
- Years active: 1991–present
- Notable credits: BBC News Channel; BBC Weekend News; BBC World News; BBC News at Nine; World News Today; BBC News at Five; BBC News at One
- Spouse: Stephen Morris (m. 2000, divorced)
- Children: 2

Martine Sarah Croxall FRGS (born 23 February 1969) is a British television journalist. She is one of the main news presenters on BBC News. She began her career working for the BBC in 1991 and joined the BBC News team in 2001. Croxall has presented various news programmes, including World News Today, BBC Weekend News, Dateline London and BBC News at One.

== Education ==
Martine Sarah Croxall was born on 23 February 1969 and grew up in Stoke Golding, a village in the Hinckley and Bosworth district of Leicestershire, England, where her father Ian ran Croxall Hosiery. She has one younger sister. She attended the independent Bablake School in Coventry. As a teenager, she had wanted to be a vet but concluded she would not get the required grades in science, being better at humanities. In 1990, she graduated with a degree in Geography from the University of Leeds.

== Career ==
In 1991, Croxall began work experience at BBC Radio Leicester. She followed this by working at BBC East Midlands Today, the BBC regional news programme for the region. She has also worked at Newsroom South East (1997) and UK Today.

She was a regular news presenter on BBC News between 18:30 and midnight, alternate Thursdays, Friday–Sunday. She occasionally hosted Afternoon Live on BBC News and has presented on both BBC World News and World News Today.

Croxall was the BBC's main presenter during the November 2015 Paris attacks. Her presentation was subsequently praised by the American journalist David Henderson.

External videos
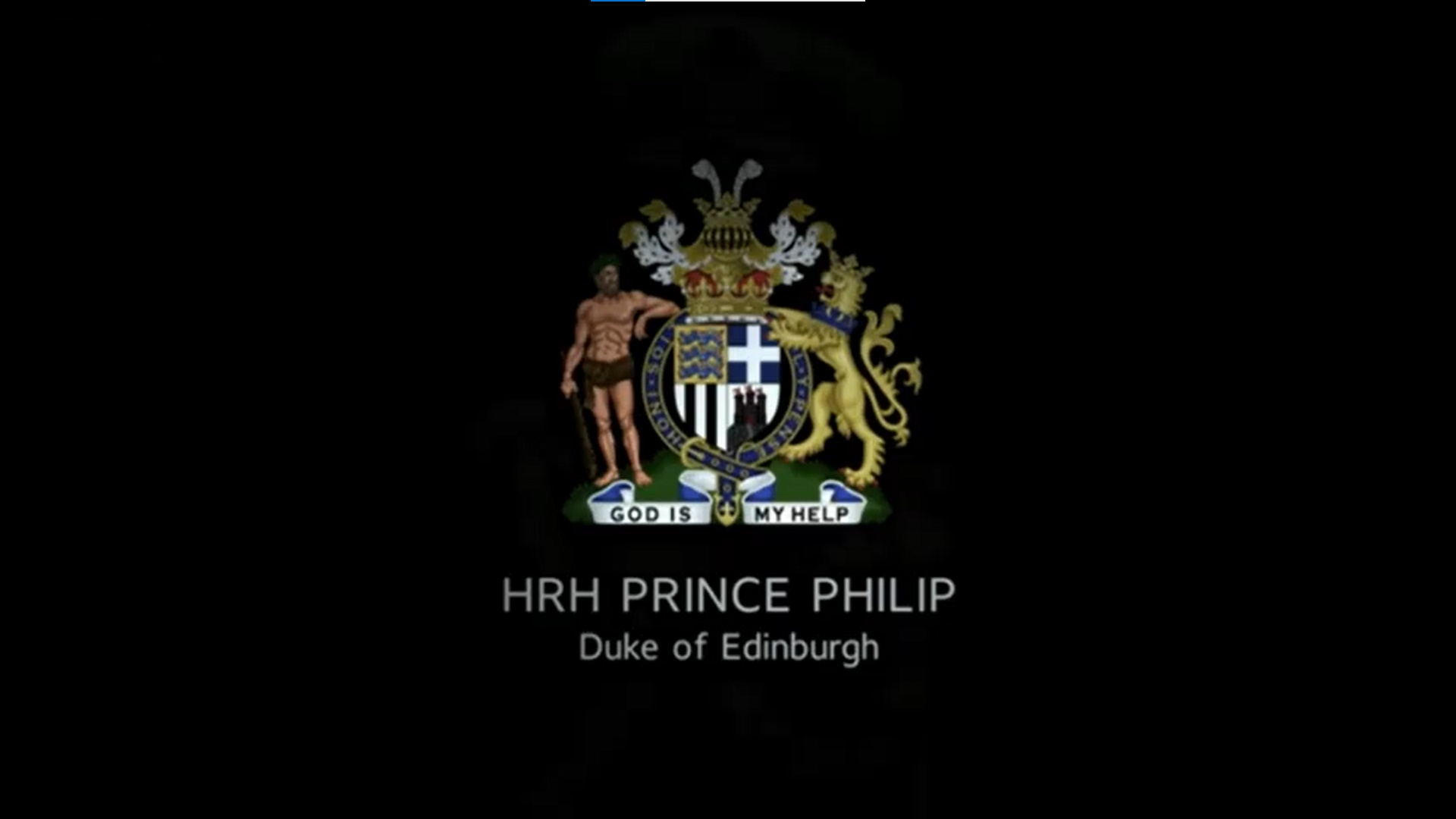
- Announcement of the death of the Duke of Edinburgh on the BBC News channel read by Croxall.

She was presenting BBC News on 9 April 2021, when the news broke of the death of Prince Philip, Duke of Edinburgh. Her delivery was praised for its professionalism and tone.

On 21 May 2021, Croxall presented Dateline London for the first time. Since 2017 Croxall has presented the BBC Weekend News lunchtime edition. On 19 June 2021 Croxall presented the BBC Weekend News evening and late bulletins for the first time. On 1 September 2021, Croxall presented the BBC News at One for the first time.

In March 2022, Croxall won an episode of Celebrity Mastermind; her specialist subject was American investigative journalist Nellie Bly.

Croxall was taken off air for 11 days and found to have breached impartiality rules for comments made introducing the BBC News channel's "The Papers" newspaper review on 23 October 2022. Following the sudden news that Boris Johnson had withdrawn from contesting the Conservative Party leadership, Croxall declared that it was "all very exciting" and asked if she was "allowed to be this gleeful", before remarking that their review of tomorrow's papers would be difficult as they were being hastily rewritten. The BBC concluded that Croxall's "remarks and reactions... caused a significant risk the audience could believe opinions were being expressed on the Conservative leadership contest."

On 2 February 2023, it was reported that Croxall – alongside many other presenters of the domestic BBC News Channel – would lose their presenting roles as part of the BBC's relaunched news channel. On 26 May 2024, Croxall returned as a presenter on the BBC News channel.

On 22 June 2025, when reading the autocue for a news report about a study from the London School of Hygiene & Tropical Medicine, Croxall corrected – "with emphasis and a slight roll of her eyes" – the words "pregnant people" to "women". She was praised by author J. K. Rowling, who has publicly opposed gender-neutral language in contexts related to sex and reproduction. The Times reported that "the BBC does not have specific guidelines on the use of gender-neutral terms such as 'pregnant people'". Croxall subsequently posted on social media with a screenshot from the broadcast, saying "A huge thank you to everyone who has chosen to follow me today for whatever reason. It's been quite a ride..." In November, the BBC upheld 20 complaints related to the incident, finding that Croxall's actions breached impartiality standards.

In October 2025, she was announced as the main co-presenter for the News Channel's relaunched Breakfast show for UK, Europe and Africa alongside Sally Bundock.

== Personal life ==
Croxall married Stephen Morris in December 2000 in the Royal Borough of Kensington and Chelsea. The couple have a son (born March 2002) and daughter (born May 2004), but are now divorced. She lives in St Albans, Hertfordshire.

She is a Fellow of the Royal Geographical Society.
