= Geeta Guru-Murthy =

British journalist

- Born: Geeta Guru-Murthy; 1968 (age 57–58); Liverpool, England
- Occupation: Journalist
- Spouse: Philip Collins (m. 2002)
- Children: 2
- Relatives: Krishnan Guru-Murthy (brother)

Geeta Guru-Murthy (born 1968) is a British television journalist. Since 2013, she has presented mainly morning bulletins, including BBC News at Nine, and bulletins on BBC World News, BBC Two, BBC News Channel and BBC World News.

== Early life ==
Guru-Murthy was born in Liverpool to a Tamil Indian family, and grew up in West Bradford, Lancashire close to where her father worked as a radiologist in the local hospitals at Burnley and Blackburn. She was involved with orchestras, theatres and choirs before going on to study biochemistry, and later changing careers.

== Career ==
Guru-Murthy was a reporter for the BBC's regional news programme, BBC Look North (Yorkshire and North Midlands), before moving to 5 News. In January 1998, she covered the breaking of the Clinton–Lewinsky scandal from Champaign, Illinois, for 5 News. By 2002, Guru-Murthy was hosting Asia Today, with regular work for BBC World, BBC News 24, and BBC Breakfast, and by 2005 presenting the news on BBC Radio 4. In 2002, she appeared in the television series Waking the Dead.

In 2017, Guru-Murthy was one of several female BBC employees campaigning against the gender pay gap.

On 2 February 2023, it was confirmed that Guru-Murthy, along with many other presenters of the domestic BBC News Channel, would lose their presenting roles as part of the BBC's relaunched news channel. In January 2024, it was announced she would rejoin the channel as a chief presenter.

In May 2024, Guru-Murthy was accused of violating BBC impartiality rules by characterising Nigel Farage's remarks as "customary inflammatory language". She subsequently issued an apology for failing to meet BBC standards for impartiality.

In January 2026, Guru-Murthy was accused of criticising British rapper DC3 (Daniel Chenjerai) during a BBC News interview. Viewers interpreted an audible intake of breath after DC3 named Jesus Christ among his heroes as a negative "hissing" reaction. Guru-Murthy stated on X that she was simply breathing before concluding the interview, while the BBC rejected claims that she had "hissed", describing them as inaccurate.

== Personal life ==
Guru-Murthy married speech-writer and journalist Philip Collins in June 2002, taking a honeymoon in India. Her younger brother, Krishnan Guru-Murthy, is also a journalist and broadcaster for Channel 4 News.
