= Maxine Mawhinney =

- Born: Belfast, Northern Ireland
- Occupations: Journalist, presenter, newsreader
- Notable credit: BBC News
- Spouse: John Clare
- Children: 2

Maxine Mawhinney is a Northern Irish former newsreader on BBC News, the BBC's 24-hour rolling news channel.

== Biography ==
Born in Belfast, Northern Ireland, Mawhinney was educated at Strathearn School and then moved to Donaghadee and was educated at Regent House School, Newtownards. She trained as a newspaper journalist in Northern Ireland, then joined BBC Television and Radio in Belfast, before moving to Ulster Television and then ITN in London.

She joined Sky News at its launch in 1988, as Ireland correspondent, remaining for two years before going to Tokyo as News Editor for Asia for Reuters Television. After two years in Asia, she spent a year in Frankfurt, Germany, for Reuters Television, before being appointed Washington Correspondent for GMTV at its launch in 1992.

Mawhinney returned to London in 1996, joining the BBC's international news channel BBC World. She was the duty presenter in the early hours of 31 August 1997, when news broke of the fatal car crash of Diana, Princess of Wales. She can be seen in this role in the 2006 feature film The Queen.

In November 1997, she joined the BBC News Channel (then known as BBC News 24) as one of the launch presenters. Mawhinney presented in various timeslots on the channel, including a period in the afternoon slot alongside Matthew Amroliwala and Chris Eakin, before being assigned to Sunday afternoons in April 2006. She took on the Saturday and Monday morning slots and the Friday afternoon slot, as well as regularly covering other shifts on the channel.

She also presented BBC Breakfast and the BBC One O'Clock News (later BBC News at One). Later, she appeared on News at One weekend lunchtime bulletins as part of her weekend shifts.

Mawhinney is married to John Clare and has two daughters from her first marriage. She lives in Stanley Pontlarge, Gloucestershire. She had previously lived in Chiswick, London. She had two younger sisters, Alexa and Lorraine, who died from skin cancer. She was diagnosed with breast cancer in November 2013; she underwent surgery, drug therapy and radiotherapy, and was back in the studio in March 2014.

She left the BBC in April 2017, presenting her last BBC News Channel shift on 10 April.
