= Ben Brown (journalist) =

British journalist and news presenter

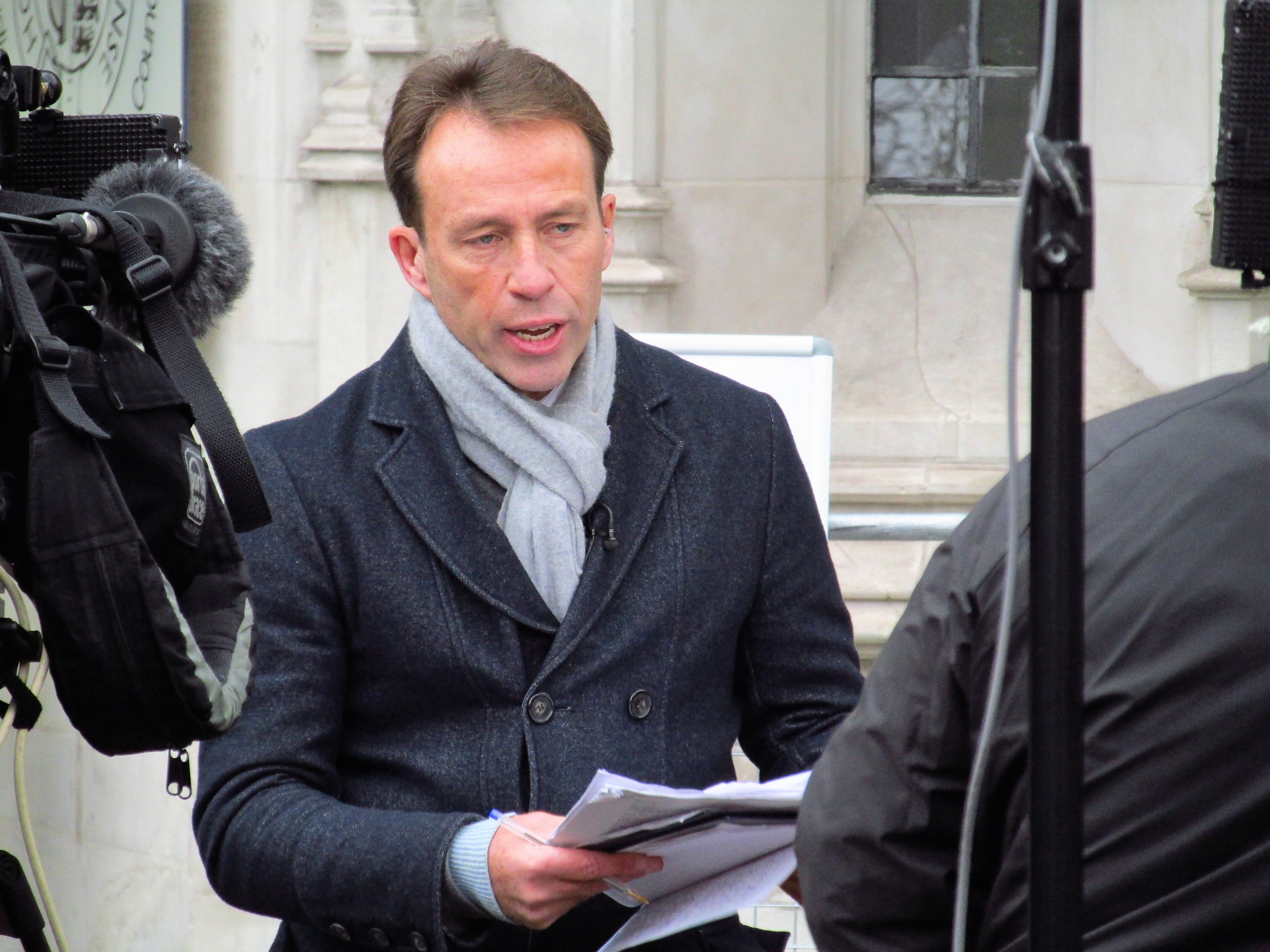
- Born: Benjamin Russell Brown; 26 May 1960 (age 65); Kent, England
- Occupations: TV presenter, newsreader and journalist
- Years active: 1986–present
- Notable work: BBC News at One; BBC News at Ten; BBC Weekend News; BBC News Channel; BBC World News

Benjamin Russell Brown (born 26 May 1960) is an English journalist and news presenter best known for presenting BBC News programmes, including News at One and Weekend News.

== Early life ==
Benjamin Russell Brown was born on 26 May 1960 in Kent. He is the son of the ITN newscaster Antony Brown. Brown was educated at Sutton Valence School, an independent school near Maidstone. During his time at school, Brown was on the debating team, and took second place in the national debating championships. He won an Open Scholarship to Keble College, Oxford, where he studied Philosophy, Politics and Economics, before graduating from the Cardiff School of Journalism, Media and Cultural Studies with a Diploma with a Distinction. He joined Radio Clyde in Glasgow as a reporter, and later became a reporter for Radio City in Liverpool.

== Career ==
=== Reporting ===
In 1986, Brown joined Independent Radio News, covering major stories from superpower summits to the Hungerford massacre. He joined BBC TV News two years later and was a Foreign Affairs Correspondent until 1991, reporting the fall of the Berlin Wall and the Gulf War, from Saudi Arabia and Kuwait.

He was appointed Moscow Correspondent in 1991, where he witnessed the final collapse of Communism and the fall of Mikhail Gorbachev. He was at the Russian Parliament when troops loyal to President Boris Yeltsin stormed it in 1993, and the following year he was in Chechnya for the start of the civil war. His coverage of that conflict won him several international prizes, including the Bayeux War Correspondent of the Year Award and the Golden Nymph Award from the Monte-Carlo Television Festival.

In January 1995, Brown resumed his roving role as a foreign correspondent, based in London. He covered the break-up of Yugoslavia extensively, reporting from Bosnia-Herzegovina, Croatia and Kosovo, where his stories helped to secure several awards for the BBC, including a BAFTA (British Academy of Film and Television Arts) award.

In 2001 he won the Bayeux-Calvados Award for war correspondents for the second time for his coverage of the Intifada in Israel.

More recently, in 2003 Brown was embedded with British troops in the Iraq War. He wrote about his experiences in a book, The Battle for Iraq, notably how a British soldier saved his life by opening fire on an Iraqi militiaman who was just about to shoot Brown in the back with a rocket-propelled grenade. Brown covered the first Gulf War in 1991, and his account of that, All Necessary Means, was also published.

=== Other work ===
Brown wrote a novel based on his experiences of war reporting, entitled Sandstealers. The novel was published in May 2009 by HarperCollins.

== Personal life ==
Brown is married and has three children.
