= The Context (TV programme) =

British television programme

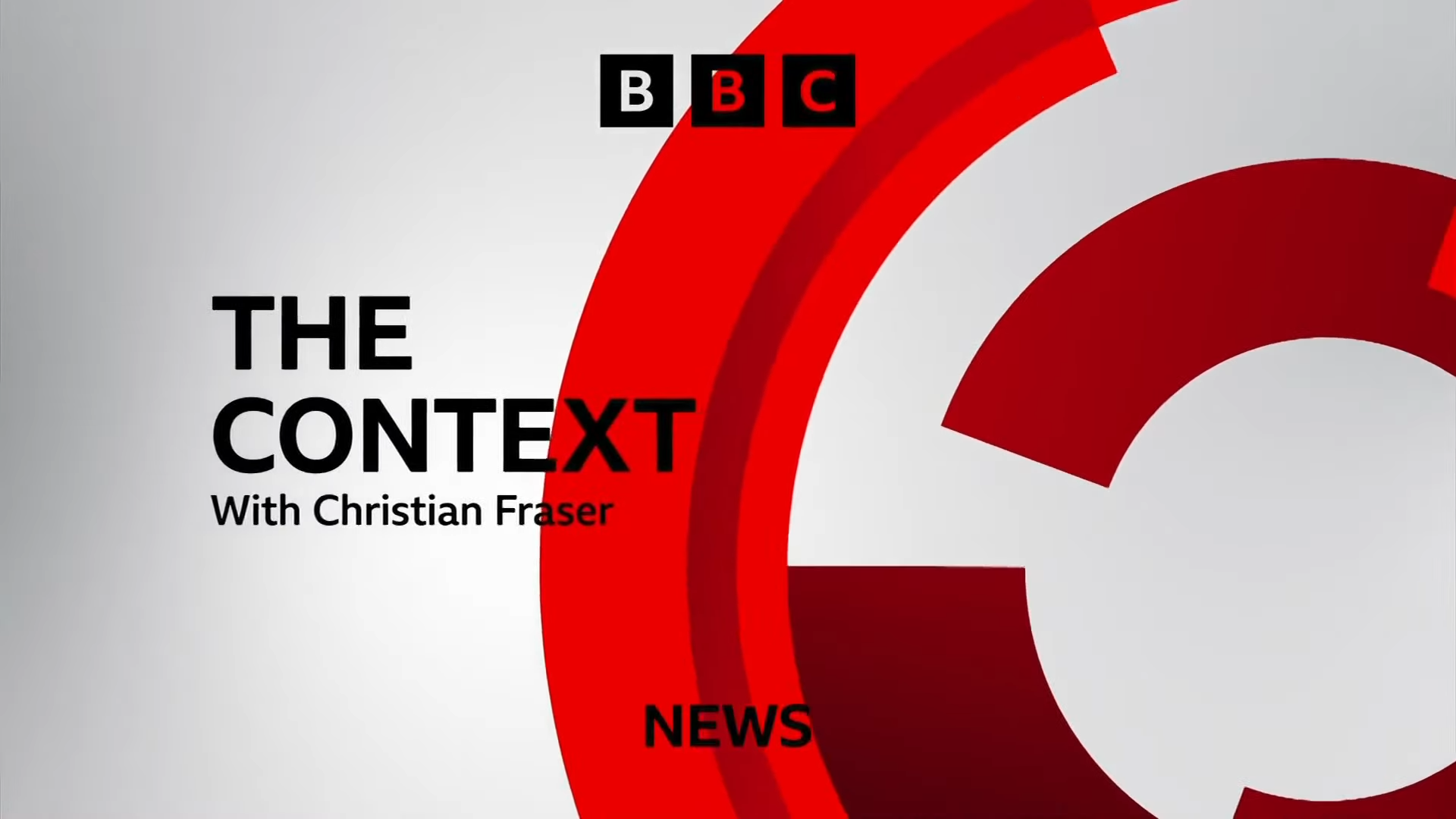
- Title card used since 21 April 2023
- Also known as: 100 Days (January 2017 – April 2017); 100 Days+ (May 2017 – July 2017); Beyond 100 Days (September 2017 – March 2020); BBC News with Katty and Christian (August 2020 – June 2021); Context (January 2022 – April 2022); The Context with Christian Fraser (April 2022 – present)
- Genre: News Roundup
- Created by: BBC News
- Presented by: Christian Fraser (2017 – present); Katty Kay (2017 – 2021, 2022 - present); Laura Trevelyan (2017 – 2023); Sumi Somaskanda; Kasia Madera; John Simpson
- Countries of origin: United Kingdom; United States
- Original language: English

Production
- Production locations: Studios E & C, Broadcasting House, London; BBC Studio, Washington D.C.
- Camera setup: Multi-camera
- Running time: 86 minutes (BBC News); 26 minutes (BBC Four & PBS)

Original release
- Network: BBC News (international feed); BBC News (UK feed); BBC Four; BBC Parliament
- Release: 23 January 2017 – present

Related
- BBC News; BBC World News America; Newsday; GMT; Impact; Global; World News Today; Outside Source; Focus on Africa; The Daily Global; Verified Live; BBC News Now

The Context, also styled as The Context with Christian Fraser, is a live current affairs programme that airs Monday to Friday on the international and UK feeds of the BBC News channels from 20:00 GMT till 22:00 GMT.

The programme aims to provide a discussion about international news with interviews of select guests and BBC News correspondents from around the world.

The Context is the BBC's flagship panel programme focusing on politics and government, with a particular focus on UK and US view.

== History ==
The programme debuted in 2017 as 100 Days and aired daily to document the first one hundred days of US president Donald Trump in administration. After the first 100 days of President Trump's presidency passed, the programme continued; it was briefly called 100 Days+ before it was launched in September 2017 as Beyond 100 Days in the same timeslot Monday to Thursday right after Focus on Africa and BBC News at Six. Beyond 100 Days was originally an edition of World News Today. It was jointly hosted live by Katty Kay from Washington, D.C., and Christian Fraser from London. It focused on the current US Administration, global politics, Brexit and news from around the world, with attempted punches of irreverent wit and fun.

The show was presented from various locations during this time such as Brussels (during European Council meetings), BBC News Singapore (for a week during the 2018 North Korea–United States summit). The show was also presented, for a week in May 2018, from London and Windsor by Kay and Fraser respectively, during the wedding of Prince Harry and Meghan Markle.

The programme also aired on other networks. It premiered on 2 January 2018 on PBS stations in the United States. It appears that it had been cancelled on PBS after the introduction of an hour long Amanpour & Company programme debuted the week of 10 September 2018. It also aired on BBC Four.

In late August to December 2019, Kay moved to Senegal with her family to write her latest book. Michelle Fleury was the main stand-in Washington anchor during this period.

In March 2020, the programme was suspended due to the COVID-19 pandemic, however, Kay and Fraser often co-presented a half-hour weekly look at what's going on both sides of the Atlantic at 19:30 on Thursday and/or Friday.

On 17 August 2020, the programme returned as BBC News with Katty and Christian.

On 24 June 2021, the last programme in its previous format aired. In the back half of the final programme, frequent contributors Jon Sopel and Ron Christie featured, as well as a compilation of some of the show's highlights over the years.

In January 2022, after having been off air for six months following Kay's departure, the programme was relaunched as The Context and since has been styled as The Context with Christian Fraser which aims to provide a discussion about international news with interviews of select guests and BBC News correspondents from around the world.

In September 2022, Kay briefly returned as co-presenter and panellist following the death of Queen Elizabeth II and both Fraser and Kay presented the week of the 2022 United States elections. Kay also returned for the 2023 England local elections and for the coronation of Charles III and Camilla.

Since the restructuring of the BBC News Channel in April 2023, the programme was moved into a primetime slot from 20:00 till 22:00 GMT, Christian Fraser was named a Chief Presenter on the News Channel as a whole, and the graphics and logo of the programme were updated to suit the channel's new digital vision.

== Format ==
The one hour-long programme originally aired at 19:00 GMT/BST weekdays on the BBC News Channel in the UK, which meant 14:00 EST on BBC World News. In August 2020, the show moved to 21:00 GMT/BST in the UK, 16:00 EST on BBC World News.

Since April 2023, the programme is now aired and broadcast for two hours from 20:00 GMT/BST weekdays on BBC News around the world and across the UK. The programme uses Studio C, with the backdrop of London at night, the main anchor (usually Fraser) in the Broadcasting House studio and guests appearing via video for segments such as The Panel.

Interviews have previously been carried out both in the Washington studio and the London studio, with Kay and Fraser contributing to each other's interviews. Regular contributors to the programme included Ron Christie, a Republican strategist who served as a former adviser to George W. Bush, BBC North America editor and relief presenter Jon Sopel, and political correspondents Rajini Vaidyanathan (Washington), Adam Fleming and Iain Watson (Westminster). In mid-2019, Vaidyanathan moved to Delhi and left the programme and John Pienaar - a former contributor - left the BBC to join Times Radio.

Since 2025, the second part of Friday's programme has been subtitled The Week with John Simpson, with the veteran world affairs editor looking back on the week's international and diplomatic developments.

== Presenters ==
=== Presenters ===
Date	Presenter	Role
2022–present	Christian Fraser	Main presenter
2022–present	Katty Kay	Occasional co-presenter (Washington)
2025–present	John Simpson	Main presenter, The Week
Kasia Madera
2024–present	Sumi Somaskanda	Occasional co-presenter (Washington)
2024–present	Caitríona Perry	Occasional co-presenter (Washington)
2023–present	Lewis Vaughan-Jones	
2023–present	Ben Thompson	
2023–present	Sumi Somaskanda	
2023–present	Sarah Campbell	
2023–present	Ben Boulos	
2023–present	Geeta Guru-Murthy	
2023–present	Kasia Madera	
2023–present	Anjana Gadgil	
2023–present	Tanya Beckett	
2023–present	Rajini Vaidyanathan	
2023–present	Steve Lai	
2023–present	Nancy Kacungira	(currently on maternity leave)

When Christian Fraser presents, the title sequence ends by stating, "The Context with Christian Fraser". When other presenters present the programme, the title only shows "The Context", regardless of the presenter. When John Simpson presents, the title sequence ends by stating, "The Week with John Simpson". When other presenters present the programme, the title only shows "The Week", regardless of the presenter.

=== Former presenters ===
Years	Presenter	Previous role
2017–2020	Matthew Price	Relief presenter
2017–2021	Clive Myrie	Relief presenter
2019-2021	James Reynolds	Relief presenter
2021–2023	David Eades	Relief presenter
Maryam Moshiri		Relief presenter
Nuala McGovern		Relief presenter
