= The Hub (TV programme) =

Television news programme

- Created by: BBC World News
- Presented by: Nik Gowing
- Country of origin: United Kingdom
- Original language: English

Production
- Production locations: Studio N8, BBC Television Centre, London
- Running time: 90 minutes

Original release
- Network: BBC World News
- Release: 1 February 2010 – 21 December 2012

Related
- Global; BBC World News; BBC World News America; Newsday; GMT; Impact; Focus on Africa; World News Today

The Hub is a news programme that was shown on the international news and current affairs channel BBC World News, between February 2010 and December 2012. The programme was launched as part of a network-wide refresh and is presented by Nik Gowing. The programme aired at 17:00 GMT (17:00 BST in the summer) for 90 minutes.

The Hub replaced an edition of World News Today and served as a news 'nerve centre' for South Asia and the Middle East, providing both the headlines, and detailed analysis of the global news agenda. An edition of World Business Report followed the programme.

The programme aired its last edition on 21 December 2012 and was replaced by Global on 14 January 2013.

== Former presenters ==
If there is no position before the years of being a presenter, then this newsreader was a relief presenter.

- Nik Gowing (Main presenter, 2010–2012)
- Jonathan Charles (2010–2011)
- Lyse Doucet (2010–2012)
- David Eades (2010–2012)
- Tim Willcox (2010–2012)
- Peter Dobbie (2010–2012)
- Geeta Guru-Murthy (2010–2012)
- Lucy Hockings (2010–2012)
- Philippa Thomas (2010–2012)
- Karin Giannone (2010–2012)
- Naga Munchetty (2010–2012)
