= Global (TV programme) =

- Final title card, used from 2022 to 2023.
- Also known as: Global with Jon Sopel (January 2013 - July 2014); Global with Matthew Amroliwala (Sept. 2014 - 3 March 2023)
- Created by: BBC World News
- Presented by: Matthew Amroliwala; Tim Willcox
- Country of origin: United Kingdom
- Original language: English

Production
- Production locations: Studio C, Broadcasting House, London
- Running time: 2 hours

Original release
- Network: BBC World News
- Release: 14 January 2013 – 3 March 2023

Related
- The Hub; BBC World News; BBC World News America; Newsday; GMT; Impact; Focus on Africa; World News Today; Verified Live; The Daily Global; BBC News Now

Global, styled also as Global with Matthew Amroliwala (as of 8 September 2014), is a news programme on BBC World News that premiered on 14 January 2013 with the relaunch of the channel from Broadcasting House. The programme was hosted initially by Jon Sopel who joined the channel from the domestic BBC News channel. Sopel regularly presented the programme on location around the world and in this case it is broadcast in part on the BBC News channel. Sopel was promoted to North America Editor in 2014, and was succeeded in September by Matthew Amroliwala.

Global replaced The Hub, which originally was an edition of World News Today and served as a news 'nerve centre' for South Asia and the Middle East, providing both the headlines, and detailed analysis of the global news agenda.

As part of BBC's plan to merge its domestic BBC News channel in the UK and BBC World News in early 2023, Global was one of the programmes which was cancelled. The final episode aired on 3 March 2023 at 18:00 GMT on the then BBC World News.

The programme is spiritually replaced by Verified Live, which aims at fact-checking of news based on confirmed facts and sources. It debuted on 22 May 2023.

== Schedule ==
Global was aired from 16:00 to 17:45 and 18:00 to 18:15 GMT (17:00–18:45 and 19:00–19:15 BST in summer time), Monday to Thursday on BBC World News, split in-between by Sport Today and usually followed by an edition of Global Business.

== Presenters ==
| Years | Presenter | Current role |
|---|---|---|
| 2014–2023 | Matthew Amroliwala | Main Presenter |
| 2013–2023 | Tim Willcox | Deputy Presenter |
| 2013–2023 | David Eades | Relief Presenter |
| 2013–2023 | Lucy Hockings | Relief Presenter |
| 2013–2023 | Karin Giannone | Relief Presenter |
| 2013–2023 | Geeta Guru-Murthy | Relief Presenter |
| 2013–2023 | Philippa Thomas | Relief Presenter |
| 2013–2023 | Kasia Madera | Relief Presenter |
| 2013–2023 | Chris Rogers | Relief Presenter |
| 2018–2023 | Samantha Simmonds | Relief Presenter |
| 2018–2023 | Nuala McGovern | Relief Presenter |
| 2019–2023 | Maryam Moshiri | Relief Presenter |

Former presenters
| Years | Presenter | Previous role |
|---|---|---|
| 2013–2014 | Jon Sopel | Main Presenter |
| 2013–2014 | Ros Atkins | Deputy Presenter |
| 2013–2014 | Komla Dumor | Main Presenter |
| 2013–2014 | Rajesh Mirchandani | Relief Presenter |
| 2013–2014 | Naga Munchetty | Main Presenter |

When Jon Sopel presented, the title sequence ended by stating 'Global with Jon Sopel'. However, when he did not, as he was often on assignment, the titles only showed 'Global', regardless of the replacement presenter. This only happensed if he wasn't reporting from a location on a topic covered in the show.

It was announced that Sopel would step down as presenter to become North America Editor; he presented his final episode on 17 July 2014.

Prior to Sopel's final episode, it was announced (on 8 July 2014) that BBC News Channel presenter Matthew Amroliwala would succeed Sopel in September 2014 as the main presenter. Amroliwala presented his first episode on 8 September 2014; and since the programme had been styled 'Global with Matthew Amroliwala'.

Dumor died on 18 January 2014 in his Hertfordshire, England home after a cardiac arrest, having been on air the day before. President of Ghana John Mahama said in a message on Twitter that Dumor was one of Ghana's "finest ambassadors" and "was a broadcaster of exceptional quality and Ghana's gift to the World." Mirchandani resigned from the BBC in October 2014; he has since become the Senior Director of Communications at the Center for Global Development.
