= World News Today =

BBC news programme

- Final title card, used from 2019 to 2020
- Created by: BBC World News
- Presented by: Philippa Thomas; Karin Giannone; Kasia Madera (Fri); Alpa Patel (Sat-Sun)
- Country of origin: United Kingdom
- Original language: English

Production
- Production locations: Studio C, Broadcasting House, London
- Running time: 30 minutes

Original release
- Network: BBC World News; BBC Four; BBC Four HD (2013–2020); BBC News Channel; BBC One (2008–2010)
- Release: 30 May 2006 – 20 March 2020

Related
- The World; BBC News at Nine; BBC World News; BBC World News America; Newsday; GMT; Impact; Global; Focus on Africa, Outside Source, BBC Breakfast, BBC News at One, BBC News at Five, BBC News at Six, BBC News at Nine, BBC Weekend News

World News Today is a current-affairs news programme, produced by BBC News that was presented on Friday-Sundays with Philippa Thomas, Karin Giannone and Kasia Madera. Presenters alternated the weekend shifts. It was originally conceived as a morning television show aimed at American audiences, hosted by George Alagiah, but later expanded to six editions a day aimed at different markets. There was then one daily edition only, aimed as an evening news programme for the UK, Europe, Middle East and Africa part-simulcast on BBC Four, BBC News Channel and BBC World News. The programme aired until 20 March 2020.

== History ==
The programme originally used the same graphics and music as BBC World, though when The World on BBC Four was renamed World News Today, all editions were given a separate set of graphics and music with three being simulcast in the UK (03:00 on BBC One & BBC News, 12:00 on BBC Two, 19:00 on BBC Four). Since April 2008, the programme used the standard title sequence of the BBC's English Regions, with some graphical alterations and with international images included. The first 30 minutes of each broadcast are still simulcast on BBC Four.

As part of a channel refresh on BBC World News, five editions of World News Today were replaced on 1 February 2010 with GMT, Impact Asia now Impact, The Hub (later replaced with Global in 2013), Business Edition (later replaced by Outside Source and World News Today but returned replacing an edition of World News Today under the name Business Live), and a standard edition of BBC World News (replaced by Outside Source in 2014).

These five editions were again relaunched as BBC News Now, Verified Live and The World Today with Maryam Moshiri in 2023 and 2024. While the successor to Beyond 100 Days, The Context continued.

=== 2015 changes ===
On 5 June 2015, a new edition was launched on the BBC News Channel and BBC World News at 21:00 BST (summer) or GMT (winter) on Friday–Sunday. Half an hour was dropped in November for the return of Business Edition. This replaced the BBC News at Nine and a standard edition of BBC World News on weekends.

=== 2017 changes ===
Since the inauguration of Donald Trump as US president, World News Today has not been broadcast on Monday to Thursdays. Additionally, beginning at the end of April, World News Today was off air for a number of weeks, a change that was originally meant to be permanent but was later reversed, meaning that World News Today continues to be broadcast at 19:00 UK time on Fridays and at 21:00 UK time Friday–Sunday.

However, the 17 July schedules show that World News Today would return to the Monday-Thursday at 18:00 GMT (19:00 BST) on BBC Four and BBC World News. Katty Kay and Christian Fraser announced on 100 Days+ that the programme would end on the Thursday.

Between 22 December and 1 January, Beyond 100 Days and Outside Source were both replaced with an edition of World News Today at 19:00 on BBC World News and at 21:00 on the BBC News Channel. On 1 December, PBS America announced that the US network has acquired the rights to simulcast World News Today, starting from 1 January.

=== 2019 changes ===
From 15 July 2019, BBC News and World News were integrated into the BBC's custom font (BBC Reith) and World News Today was given a BBC Reith update. It was first seen at 12:00 on BBC World News and BBC News.

=== Cancellation in 2020 ===
The final episode of World News Today aired on 20 March 2020 at 22:00 GMT. It was eventually replaced by The World Today with Maryam Moshiri which has a similar remit in 2024. Kacungria, Madera and Giannone still cover the slot as relief presenters when Moshiri is unavailable.

== Presenters ==
The remaining original edition shown on BBC Four and BBC World News was presented by:

Years	Presenter	Current role
2018–present	Nancy Kacungira	Main presenter
2008–present	Karin Giannone	Main presenter
2013–present	Kasia Madera	Main presenter
2009–2017, 2018–present	Tanya Beckett	Relief presenter
2007–present	Tim Willcox	Relief presenter
2014–present	Geeta Guru-Murthy	Relief presenter
2014–present	Babita Sharma	Relief presenter
2014–present	Alice Baxter	Relief presenter
2015–present	Chris Rogers	Relief presenter
2015–present	Ben Bland	Relief presenter
2016–present	Reged Ahmad	Relief presenter
2016–present	Maryam Moshiri	Relief presenter
2016–present	Lebo Diseko	Relief presenter
2016–present	Nuala McGovern	Relief presenter
2017–present	Samantha Simmonds	Relief presenter
2017–present	Duncan Golestani	Relief presenter
2017–present	Lukwesa Burak	Relief presenter
2017–present	Lucy Grey	Relief presenter
2017–present	Celia Hatton	Relief presenter
2018–present	Lewis Vaughan Jones	Relief presenter
2018–present	Krupa Padhy	Relief presenter
2018–present	Martin Stanford	Relief presenter
2018–present	Aaron Safir	Relief presenter
2019–present	Simon Pusey	Relief presenter
2019–present	James Reynolds	Relief presenter

When Badawi presented, the title sequence stated World News Today with Zeinab Badawi. However, when she did not, as she was often on assignment, the titles only showed World News Today, regardless of who the relief presenter actually was. This only happened if she was not reporting from a location on a topic covered in the programme.

Thomas, Giannone and Madera still presented from different parts of the world. Giannone presented from South Africa in December 2013 following the death of Nelson Mandela and during live coverage from the trial of Oscar Pistorius in Pretoria. Madera presented from Poland during the 2015 Polish parliamentary election. Thomas, Sharma, presented from Washington in October / November 2016 for the 2016 US presidential election.

=== Guest presenters ===
The list below refers to people who have occasionally presented on an ad hoc basis:

- 2006–2010 David Eades
- 2006-2010 Nik Gowing
- 2006–2010 Lucy Hockings
- 2006-2010 Lyse Doucet
- 2015–2017 Sharanjit Leyl
- 2015–2017 Rajini Vaidyanathan
- 2016–2017 Jane O'Brien
- 2016 Clive Myrie
- 200?–2015 Martine Croxall

=== Former presenters ===
Years	Presenter	Role
200?–2012	Kirsty Lang	Deputy presenter
2013–2014	Rajesh Mirchandani	Relief presenter
2007–2014	Zeinab Badawi	Main presenter
2006–2010	George Alagiah	Main presenter 12:00GMT
2006-2010	Jonathan Charles	Main presenter 12:00GMT
2006–2010	Mishal Husain	Main presenter 13:00GMT
2008–2015	Peter Dobbie	Relief / main presenter
2015	Dani Sinha	Relief / weekend presenter
2014–2015	Adnan Nawaz	Relief
2014–2015	Daniela Ritorto	Relief
2014–2015	Christian Fraser	Relief
2016–2017	Tom Donkin	Relief
2007–2021	Phillipa Thomas	Main presenter 2014-19 / deputy presenter 2013-14 & 2019-21 / relief presenter 2007–2012
