= Impact (TV programme) =

2010–2023 British news TV program

- Final title card, used from 2019 to 2023
- Also known as: Impact Asia with Mishal Husain (2010–2011); Impact with Mishal Husain (2011–2014); Impact with Yalda Hakim (2014–2023)
- Created by: BBC World News
- Presented by: Yalda Hakim; Philippa Thomas (former)
- Country of origin: United Kingdom
- Original language: English

Production
- Production locations: Studio C, Broadcasting House, London
- Running time: 30–45 minutes
- Production company: BBC

Original release
- Network: BBC World News
- Release: 1 February 2010 – 3 March 2023

Related
- BBC World News; BBC World News America; Newsday; GMT; Global; Focus on Africa; World News Today; The Daily Global; Verified Live; BBC News Now

Impact (formerly Impact Asia), styled also as Impact with Yalda Hakim is a news programme that premiered on BBC World News on 1 February 2010 as part of a network-wide refresh. The programme was initially hosted by Mishal Husain, but in later years, the presenter is Yalda Hakim, who replaced previous presenter Mishal Husain. The programme brought audiences a mixture of breaking news, debate and analysis using the BBC's range of correspondents based in the Asia Pacific regions and around the world. Broadcasting political, diplomatic, business, sports and breaking news stories directly affecting Asia Pacific, the programme aimed to analyse stories from a global perspective. The format included sport, business and weather updates. The programme aired until 3 March 2023.

== History ==
As part of a shake-up of the BBC World News schedule, on 1 February 2010 presenter based strands were developed to give more focus on the names hosting each slot. These replaced several editions of World News Today. Impact Asia was developed as one of these slots. In 2011 the programme was renamed Impact to avoid the exclusion of other sections of the global audience.

As part of BBC's plan to merge its domestic BBC News channel in the UK and BBC World News in early 2023, Impact was one of the programmes which got cancelled. The final episode aired on 3 March 2023 at 13:00 GMT on the then BBC World News.

== Schedule ==
Impact aired from 13:00–14:30 GMT (with an extra half-hour at 15:00 GMT), weekdays on BBC World News. The programme was split into three parts, each lasting half an hour. After the final section World Business Report then Sport Today air. During British Summer Time, the programme aired at 12:00–13:30 GMT (with an extra half-hour at 14:00 GMT); and was followed by an edition of HARDtalk.

== Presentation ==
The programme was originally broadcast from studio N8 in the News Centre at BBC Television Centre, along with other output from BBC World News. When major news events occur the programme may be presented on location, for example, Mishal Husain presented from Pakistan in the aftermath of Osama Bin Laden's death. From 14 January 2013 the programme moved to Broadcasting House studio B.

== Presenters ==
Years	Presenter	Current role
2014–2023	Yalda Hakim	Main presenter
2010–2023	Mishal Husain	Relief presenter
2010–2023	Karin Giannone	Relief presenter
2010–2023	Geeta Guru-Murthy	Relief presenter
2010–2023	Lucy Hockings	Relief presenter
2010–2023	David Eades	Relief presenter
2010–2023	Tim Willcox	Relief presenter
2013–2023	Babita Sharma	Relief presenter
2013–2023	Kasia Madera	Relief presenter
2015–2023	Ben Bland	Relief presenter
2018–2023	Samantha Simmonds	Relief presenter
2018–2023	Lucy Grey	Relief presenter
2018–2023	Maryam Moshiri	Relief presenter
2018–2023	Nuala McGovern	Relief presenter
2018–2023	Krupa Padhy	Relief presenter
2022-2023	Nancy Kacungira	Relief presenter

When Yalda Hakim presented, the title sequence ended by stating 'Impact with Yalda Hakim'. However, when she did not, as she was often on assignment, the titles only showed 'Impact', regardless of the alternate presenter. This only happened if she wasn't reporting from a location on a topic covered in the show.

It was announced that Husain would leave the show in autumn 2013 to join Today, she presented her last programme on 7 October 2013. She was to maintain the role of 'relief presenter'. In April 2014, Yalda Hakim was announced as Husain's permanent replacement.
