= Verified Live =

- Title card used since 2023
- Created by: BBC News
- Presented by: Matthew Amroliwala
- Country of origin: United Kingdom
- Original language: English

Production
- Production locations: Studios E & C, Broadcasting House, London
- Running time: 30 minutes
- Production company: BBC

Original release
- Network: BBC News (UK feed); BBC News (international feed)
- Release: 22 May 2023 – present

Related
- BBC Verify; BBC World News; BBC World News America; Newsday; GMT; Global; Focus on Africa; World News Today; The World Today; BBC News Now; Impact

Verified Live, also called Verified Live with Matthew Amroliwala, is a news programme that premiered on both the UK feed and international feed of BBC News channel on 22 May 2023 as part of a refresh following the merger of the two news channels. The programme is mainly hosted by Matthew Amroliwala. The programme's main aim is to provide fact-checking of news (including corresponding images and footages) and analysing its factual accuracy based on verified data and facts live on air, while still bringing verified facts and updates especially to breaking news. It works closely with BBC Verify, BBC News's team of investigative journalists who regularly verify news reports and data.

== History ==
Prior to the BBC News channel mergers, Global, which was also presented by Matthew Amroliwala, aired for the last time on 3 March 2023 on the then BBC World News. However, BBC announced that Amroliwala would stay as a presenter for the merged channel. Between 2007 and 2010 it had originally been an edition of World News Today and then The Hub (2010–2012).

On 17 May 2023, BBC News CEO Deborah Turness announced that the corporation was unveiling a team of 60 journalists called BBC Verify. The team would be tasked to do full fact-checking by investigating video and clips, analysing data, and also conducting their own investigations. One of its intentions was to build audience trust and to prove the accuracy of BBC News's output. The team would appear across the majority of BBC News's television, radio, and online networks.

Verified Live was announced to be the first programme to work closely with BBC Verify, to begin broadcasting on 22 May 2023, with Amroliwala as the main presenter. The programme is co-presented by BBC Verify journalists, such as Lindsay McCoy, Ros Atkins (analysis editor), and Marianna Spring (the BBC's disinformation correspondent), during fact-checking segments from BBC Verify's Studio J.

== Schedule ==
All time schedules are in UK time, which is either GMT or BST depending on the month.

Verified Live airs on weekdays and splits into six parts, airing at 15:00, 15:30, 16:00, 16:45, 17:00, and 17:30, with each part airing for 30 minutes. All parts with the exception of the 17:30 edition on the international feed which breaks away for Focus on Africa are shown on both the UK and international feed of BBC News channel. The 16:30 edition also features a business round up following the close of European markets, but was replaced by an edition of Business Today on 7 May 2024. The programme is followed at 18:00 by BBC News at Six on the UK feed and The World Today on the international feed.

== Presentation ==
The programme is usually broadcast from Studio C Broadcasting House in London, although it may sometimes use Studio E as a backup studio.

== Presenters ==
Years	Presenter	Current role
2023–present	Matthew Amroliwala	Main presenter
2023–present	Ben Thompson	Main Business presenter & relief presenter
2023–present	Samantha Simmonds	Relief presenter & relief business presenter
2023–present	Lewis Vaughan Jones	Relief presenter
2023–present	Kylie Pentelow	Relief presenter
2023–present	Sarah Campbell	Relief presenter
2023–present	Luxmy Gopal	Relief presenter
2023–present	Lucy Grey	Relief presenter
2023–present	Rich Preston	Relief presenter
2023–present	Nancy Kacungira	Relief presenter (currently on maternity leave)

=== Former ===
Former presenters

Years	Presenter
2023-2024	Maryam Moshiri
