= BBC News Now =

British news TV program

- Title card used since 2023
- Also known as: News Now
- Created by: BBC News
- Presented by: Lucy Hockings
- Country of origin: United Kingdom
- Original language: English

Production
- Production locations: Studios E & C, Broadcasting House, London
- Running time: 15-30 minutes
- Production company: BBC

Original release
- Network: BBC Two; BBC News (UK feed); BBC News (international feed)
- Release: 22 May 2023 – present

Related
- BBC World News; BBC World News America; Newsday; GMT; Global; Focus on Africa; World News Today; The World Today; Verified Live; Impact

BBC News Now, styled also as BBC News Now with Lucy Hockings, is a news programme that premiered on both UK feed and international feed of BBC News channel on 22 May 2023 as part of a refresh following the merger of the two news channels. The programme is mainly hosted by Lucy Hockings. Its main focus is on fast-paced international breaking news, covering as many stories with as much detail as possible in each of its episodes. The format includes report packages, interviews, and live reactions, updates, and images from where each story breaks out.

Like its predecessors (World News Today, GMT and Live with Lucy Hockings) its designed a morning programme for North America and South America, a lunchtime/afternoon programme for Europe, Middle East and Africa, an evening programme for Asia, and a late night/early morning programme for Australia and Oceania.

== History ==
On the course of BBC News channel mergers, Live (also styled as Live with Lucy Hockings), which has a similar background as BBC News Now and was also presented by Lucy Hockings, aired for the last time on 3 March 2023 on the then BBC World News. However, BBC announced that Lucy Hockings would stay as a presenter for the merged channel.

The programme was announced by the BBC to begin broadcasting on 22 May 2023, with Lucy Hockings as the main presenter. However, the first episode, which aired that day, was presented by Maryam Moshiri. It is thought that Maryam Moshiri was at the time the chief relief presenter for all newly launched programmes, including BBC News Now. The programme puts the newest breaking news and stories as its priority to cover, while bringing live images, reactions, and updates to each story from the location where the story happens, like Live programme it spiritually replaces.

On 6 December 2023, just before starting a newscast Moshiri was captured with her middle finger to the camera, for which she apologised saying it was a "private joke" with the staff. It was later revealed that Moshiri had been counting down with her fingers with the floor manager, representing "1" with the middle finger, and she expressed relief that the full video showing this has been released.

== Schedule ==
All time schedules are in UK time, which is either GMT or BST depending on the month.

BBC News Now airs on weekdays and splits into six parts. The six parts, broadcasting at 12:00, 12:30, 13:00, 13:30, 14:00, and 14:30 air for 30 minutes each. All parts are shown on both UK and international feed of BBC News channel, except the 13:00 hour edition, when the UK feed opts out to show BBC News at One and Sportsday respectively. The first 15 minutes also air on BBC Two on Monday, Tuesday, Thursday and Friday before breaking away for Politics Live, during parliamentary recess and bank holidays the full first hour airs on BBC Two. The programme is followed at 15:00 by Verified Live.

== Presentation ==
The programme is usually broadcast from Studio C Broadcasting House in London, although it may sometimes use Studio E as a backup studio.

== Presenters ==
Years	Presenter	Current role
2023–present	Lucy Hockings	Main presenter
2023–present	Ben Thompson	Relief presenter
2023–present	Lewis Vaughan Jones	Relief presenter
2023–present	Samantha Simmonds	Relief presenter
2023–present	Tanya Beckett	Relief presenter
2023–present	Anjana Gadgil	Relief presenter
2023–present	Rich Preston	Relief presenter
2023–present	Sarah Campbell	Relief presenter
2023–present	Rajini Vaidyanathan	Relief presenter
2023–present	Lucy Grey	Relief presenter
2023–present	Nancy Kacungira	Relief presenter (currently on maternity leave)
2024–present	Annita McVeigh	Relief presenter
2024–present	Kasia Madera	Relief presenter

When Lucy Hockings presents, the title sequence ends by stating BBC News Now with Lucy Hockings. However, if other presenters present, the title sequence simply states BBC News Now regardless of the relief presenter. Moshiri left the programme in early 2024 after being appointed as the main presenter of The World Today.

=== Former ===
Former presenters

Years	Presenter
2023–2024	Maryam Moshiri
