= YHF =

YHF may refer to:

- Hearst (René Fontaine) Municipal Airport in Ontario, Canada (IATA code)
- Yalda Hakim Foundation, a charitable organisation providing scholarships to Afghani women
- Yankee Hotel Foxtrot, 2001 album by American band Wilco
