= The World Today (TV news programme) =

International TV news program

- Title card used since 2024
- Also known as: The World Today; The Daily Global (May 2023–February 2024)
- Created by: BBC News
- Presented by: Maryam Moshiri
- Country of origin: United Kingdom
- Original language: English

Production
- Production locations: Studios E & C, Broadcasting House, London
- Running time: 4 x 30 minutes
- Production company: BBC Global News

Original release
- Network: BBC News (UK feed); BBC News (international feed); BBC Sounds
- Release: 22 May 2023 – present

Related
- BBC World News; BBC World News America; Newsday; GMT; Global; Focus on Africa; World News Today; Verified Live; BBC News Now; Impact

The World Today, styled also as The World Today with Maryam Moshiri is a news programme that premiered on both UK feed and international feed of BBC News channel on 21 February 2024. The programme is mainly hosted by Maryam Moshiri. The show, dedicated to international news is said to "bring the best of the BBC's global journalism to audiences in the UK and around the world.". As well as interviews with leading figures from the arts, culture and entertainment.

The World Today is the BBC's flagship international news programme. As well as acting as the flagship evening news programme for the UK, Europe, Africa and the Middle East, it is also distributed by PBS station WETA in the United States.

== History ==
On the course of the BBC News channel mergers, Impact, which has a similar background as The Daily Global and was also presented by Yalda Hakim, aired for the last time on 3 March 2023 at 13:00 GMT on the then BBC World News. However, the BBC announced that Yalda Hakim would stay as a presenter for the merged channel.

The programme's slot originally dates back to 2004, as BBC Four News before evolving into The World and World News Today with Zeinab Badawi. During this period it was the only programme produced by BBC News for UK audiences devoted principally to international news, simulcast by what was then BBC World (later BBC World News), the BBC News Channel and BBC Four. Similarly, it focused on political and diplomatic developments, as well as interviews with government ministers from around the world. Hakim often travelled to cover stories and interviews in places like Ukraine and Afghanistan. The programme also included sports news updates. She could have been seen as the Chief World Presenter, the first on the scene and present from there.

The programme, The Daily Global was announced by the BBC to begin broadcasting on 22 May 2023, with Yalda Hakim as the main presenter. However, the first episode, which aired that day, was presented by Lewis Vaughan Jones. Nancy Kacungira had previously succeeded Badawi and her replacement, Philippa Thomas, as the main presenter of the slot between 2018 and 2020, while Kasia Madera and Karin Giannone were the deputy presenters between 2014 and 2020. But it was announced Hakim would be leaving the BBC later in 2023 to join Sky News It was announced on the same day that Maryam Moshiri would take over as the main presenter of the programme. The programme was last hosted by Yalda Hakim on 2 October 2023, until Moshiri relaunched the slot, it was presented on rota by herself, Samantha Simmonds, Rich Preston and Lewis Vaughan-Jones.

The Daily Global was relaunched as The World Today on 21 February 2024.

During the 2024 UK General Election Moshiri was temporarily reassigned to present on the UK feed of the channel, with relief presenters covering through June and early July. Moshiri announced in June, that she wouldn't regularly be presenting the programme again until late August as she is part of the 2024 Paris Olympics presenting team, co-presenting the programme with Steve Lai or Madera. She returned to the programme following leave on 10 September 2024.

In April and May 2025, Moshiri presented the programme from the Vatican following the death and funeral of Pope Francis and 2025 papal conclave

During 2026 Iran War the second part was temporarily renamed The Iran War Today or The Iran War Today with Maryam Moshiri.From 12 March, Moshiri presented the program from Doha.

In September 2026, Moshiri revealed during the programme that in November 2024 she had been diagnosed with polycythemia vera, a rare type of blood cancer for which there is no cure, although it can be managed as a chronic condition.

=== Eurovision ===
Since 2023, Moshiri has presented the programme from the Eurovision Song Contest in Liverpool, Malmo, Basel and Vienna, being based for the majority of the week in the host city on a duplex with a team in the New Broadcasting House studio.

=== 1997 version ===
The World Today was originally a breakfast news programme airing at 05:00 on both the domestic and international feeds of what is now the BBC News Channel and BBC One. But was cancelled in May 2011. During this era, it was presented by Sally Bundock with Jonathan Charles, Tanya Beckett, David Jessel or Martine Dennis, Moshiri also acted as a relief presenter and relief business presenter during this era, with her and Beckett the only presenters working on both versions of the programme.

== Schedule ==
All time schedules are in UK time, which is either GMT or BST depending on the month.

The World Today airs on weekdays and splits into four parts, airing at 18:00, 18:30, 19:00, and 19:30, with each part airing for 30 minutes. The first two parts are usually only shown on the international feed of BBC News channel when the domestic feed is showing BBC News at Six and Sportsday. However, in the event of the BBC News at Six being delayed or some big international story, all four parts are broadcast on the UK feed. The last two parts of the programme are shown on both feeds. The programme is followed at 20:00 by The Context.

19:00 & 19:30 editions are carried on worldwide on BBC Sounds Live News.

== Presentation ==
The programme is usually broadcast from Studio E at Broadcasting House in London, but recorded interviews can come from Studio D. It uses an updated version of The World Today theme music from 2002-2003 and opens after the titles "Welcome to The World Today, an hour of international news from the BBC."

The presenter introduces the programme with "It's (time) in London, this is The World Today with (their name)." and "Live from London, you're watching The World Today on BBC News.", going into breaks, different to the "Live from London, this is BBC News." and "Around the world and across the UK this is BBC News." used for the BBC News-branded programmes.

Correspondents are overlaid upon a map during the programme and the show is presented based on this format of going around the world. The first 15 minutes of the second half-hour of the programme are dedicated to a long-form report by a correspondent/investigation team or a long-form interview/discussion. This is traditionally where major investigations are premiered before being picked up by subsequent bulletins and shown on the flagship BBC News at Ten.

=== Closing segments and frivolity ===
The World Today has gone viral several times on social media due to Moshiri's coverage of positive stories in the last 15 minutes of the hour.

This has resulted in a memorable sequence where she bends a spoon and proclaims "I am the strongest person here at the BBC". Normally involving Moshiri doing something strange from spoon bending and once while reporting European Gull Screeching competition mimicking a seagull live on air, Moshiri then joked that she had been sacked for her antics, telling viewers: "I'm hearing in my ear that I've been sacked. Oh well".

About a year later, when reporting on a peacock terroring a village in Wiltshire, she remarked "I've been told by my producer not to do an impression of a peacock, so I'm going to do it anyway."

== Presenters ==
Current presenters

Years	Presenter	Current role
2023–present	Maryam Moshiri	Main presenter
2023–present	Nancy Kacungira	Regular relief presenter (currently on maternity leave)
2023–present	Lewis Vaughan Jones	Regular relief presenter
2023–present	Samantha Simmonds	Regular relief presenter
2024–present	Annita McVeigh	Regular relief presenter
2024–present	Geeta Guru-Murthy	Regular relief presenter
2024–present	Ben Brown	Regular relief presenter
2023–present	Luxmy Gopal	Relief presenter
2023–present	Sarah Campbell	Relief presenter
2023–present	Lucy Grey	Relief presenter
2023–present	Rajini Vaidyanathan	Relief presenter
2023–present	James Reynolds	Relief presenter
2023–present	Anjana Gadgil	Relief presenter
2023–present	Tanya Beckett	Relief presenter
2023–present	Rich Preston	Relief presenter
2024–present	Martine Croxall	Relief presenter
2024–present	Kasia Madera	Relief presenter
2024–present	Steve Lai	Relief presenter
2025–present	Lauren Taylor	Relief presenter
2025–present	Christian Fraser	Relief presenter
2025–present	Karin Giannone	Relief presenter
2026–present	Helena Humphrey	Relief presenter

Former presenters

Years	Presenter
2023	Yalda Hakim

When Maryam Moshiri presents, the title sequence ends by stating 'The World Today with Maryam Moshiri'. However, when any other presenter presents, the titles only show 'The World Today', regardless of the alternate presenter. Unless Moshiri is co-presenting on location like during the Death of Pope Francis.
