= Matthew Amroliwala =

British television newsreader (born 1962)

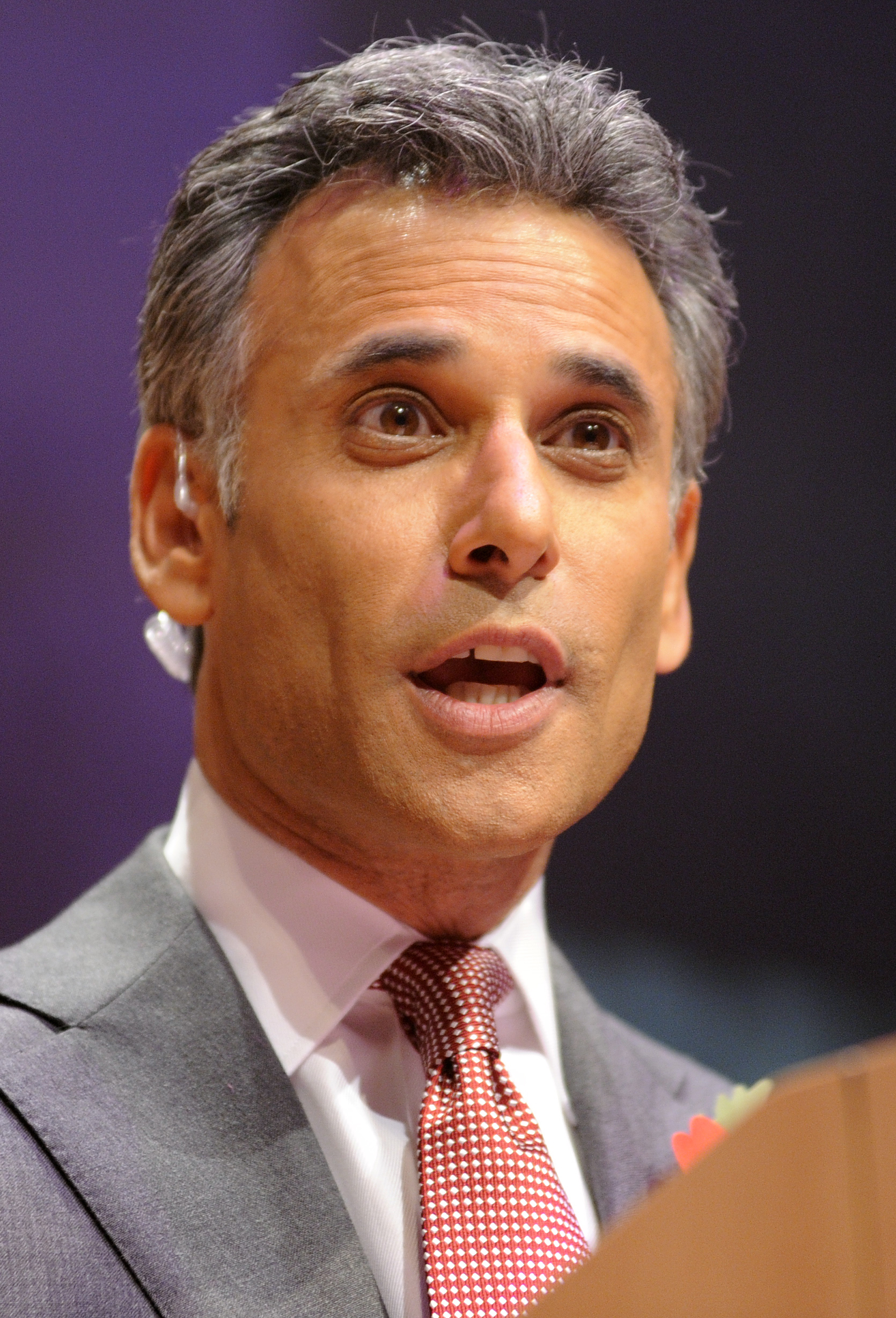
- Amroliwala in 2014
- Born: 1962 (age 63–64); Leeds, West Riding of Yorkshire, England
- Education: St Chad's College, Durham
- Occupations: Journalist; news presenter
- Employer: BBC
- Notable credits: BBC News; BBC News at One; BBC World News; Watchdog; Crimewatch; Global with Matthew Amroliwala
- Spouse: Jackie Long
- Children: 5

Mehrwan F. Amroliwala (/ˌæmroʊliˈwɒlə/ AM-roh-lee-WOL-ə; born 1962) is a British television newsreader, who is one of the chief presenters on the BBC News Channel. He has also been an occasional relief presenter of the BBC News at One on BBC One. He also presented Crimewatch alongside Kirsty Young from January 2008 until March 2015.

== Early life and education ==
Amroliwala was born Mehrwan F. Amroliwala in Leeds, West Riding of Yorkshire, England and attended King's Ely, Cambridgeshire and then Durham University. He graduated in 1984, having read Law and Politics. He is of Indian origin.

== Career ==
After working as an accountant, he joined the BBC in 1989 and became a BBC network television correspondent. In 1997, he joined the BBC News Channel as a presenter of the channel's evening programmes and from the beginning of 2001, he presented the late afternoon news programme, first with Jane Hill and then with Maxine Mawhinney. In April 2006, he was re-united with Hill on the 11 am–2 pm shift until March 2013 when the duo moved to the 2 pm–5 pm slot on Tuesday to Friday; Emily Maitlis co-presented on Mondays.

He has covered many major news stories, including reporting extensively from Northern Ireland. He has also reported from Bosnia on the fall of Srebrenica and travelled throughout the Balkans during the conflict in Bosnia. From 2008 to 2015, he co-presented the programme Crimewatch with Kirsty Young and Rav Wilding (later Martin Bayfield), specialising in the solved cases.

Since 8 September 2014, he has presented the flagship programme Global on BBC World News, the BBC’s international news channel. On 27 June 2016 he presented his first edition of World News Today on the channel and BBC Four. In February 2023, it was announced Amroliwala would become a chief presenter on the BBC’s new news channel for both UK and international viewers due to launch in April 2023.

== Personal life ==
Amroliwala is married to Jackie Long, a Channel 4 News journalist and presenter. The couple live in London and have five children.

Media offices
Preceded by Jon Sopel	Main Presenter of Global; 2014–present	Succeeded by Incumbent
