= BBC Verify =

Fact checking department at the BBC

Logo since 2023

Alternative logo used on the BBC website

BBC Verify is a service introduced by the British Broadcasting Corporation (BBC) in 2023. in October 2026 The Telegraph reported it had been accused of breaching impartiality rules after civil servants embedded in the broadcaster were tasked with writing articles and fact-checking contentious issues.

According to the BBC "BBC Verify is a specialist team of journalists using open-source intelligence (OSINT), satellite imagery, data analysis and forensic techniques. They fact-check information, verify video, counter disinformation, and analyse data to separate fact from fake, and to bring clarity on complex issues." BBC Verify says that it "pulls back the curtain" to show not only news, but to verify how it has come to be known.

The original BBC Verify Web site has individual entries for many stories. In 2025 BBC Verify Live was added, a single page on the BBC News home page and on the BBC app for a day with verification of many of the day's news stories added cumulatively as available.

== Response ==
According to UK government communications regulator Ofcom in November 2024, 26% of UK adults said they had used a fact-checking website or tool at least once, with BBC Verify most likely to be used and heard of; one in five said they used it at least once, and one in twenty saying they do so regularly.

Researchers at the Cardiff University School of Journalism, Media and Culture have monitored BBC Verify since its launch. They said in July 2025 that Verify "is considered one of the most trusted factchecking sources in the UK by the University of Oxford's Reuters Institute for the Study of Journalism and the most used by media regulator Ofcom". BBC Verify Live used official governments and their militaries or agencies as well over three-quarters of main corroborating sources, with comparatively limited use of think tanks, policy institutes, nongovernmental organisations, experts, academics or eyewitnesses.

They found that it heavily emphasised foreign affairs, and argued that it could and should be used more to fact-check UK politics, particularly at a time when the BBC's impartiality is regularly questioned. An exception was for some major political developments, and the runup to the 2024 general election, where politicians' claims were checked.

== See also ==
- List of fact-checking websites
- Verified Live, a BBC news programme focussed on fact-checking
