= Stephen Sackur =

British journalist

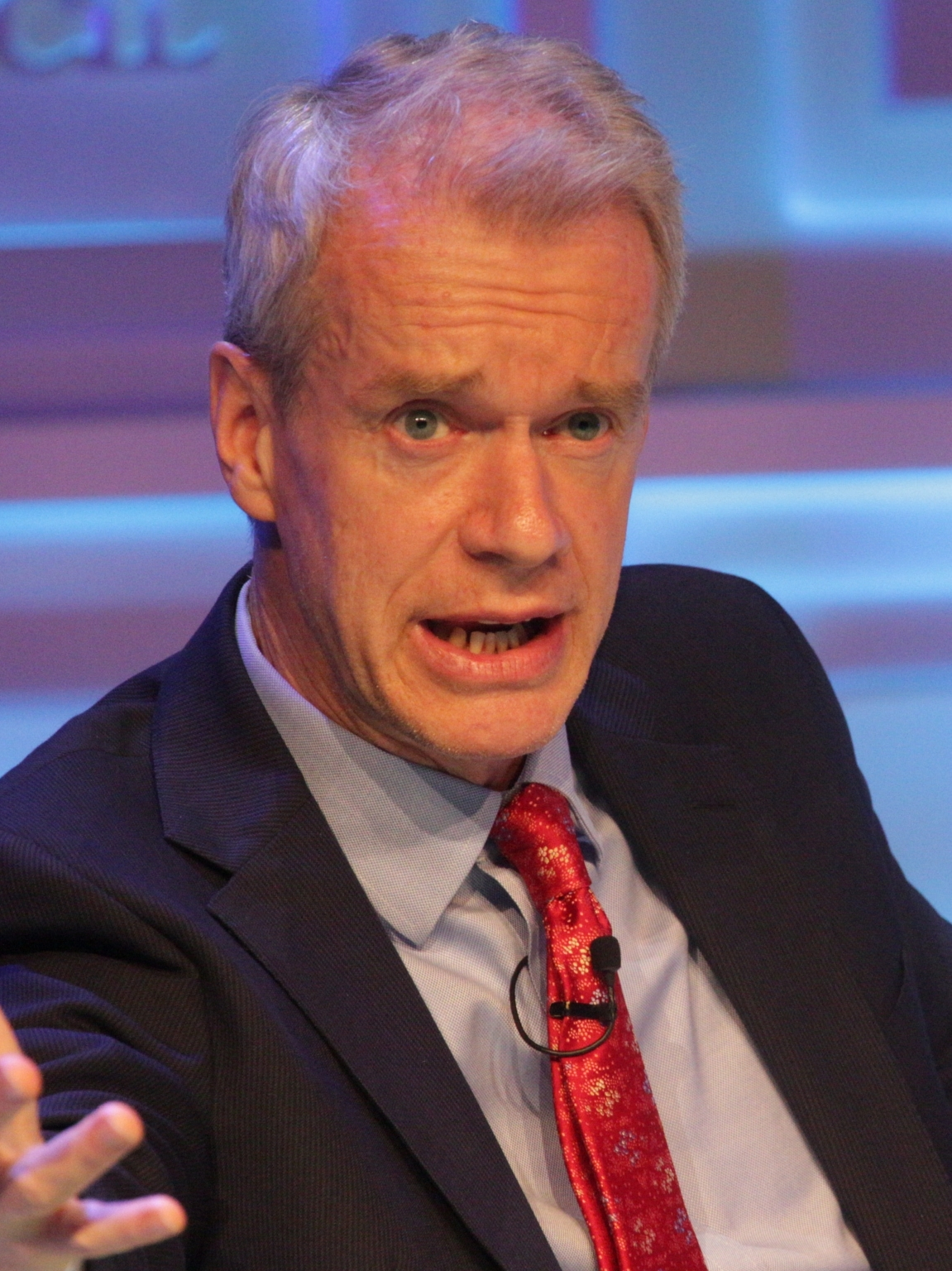
- Sackur at the World Travel and Tourism Council summit, 2015
- Born: Stephen John Sackur; 9 January 1964 (age 62); Lincolnshire
- Education: Emmanuel College, Cambridge; Harvard University
- Occupations: Journalist, News anchor
- Employer: BBC
- Notable credit(s): BBC, foreign affairs correspondent (1986–2003); HARDtalk, host (2004–2025); GMT, presenter (2010–2019)

Stephen John Sackur (born 9 January 1964) is an English journalist. He is one of the presenters of The Times at One on Times Radio. Previously, he presented HARDtalk, a current affairs interview programme on BBC World News and the BBC News Channel. He was also the main Friday presenter of GMT on BBC World News. For fifteen years, he was a BBC foreign correspondent.

== Background and education ==
Sackur's father Robert (1930 – 18 February 2022), a farmer, was from East Keal and Toynton All Saints, and farmed 190 acres (77 ha) at Woolham Farm, having lived there since 1957. He was a "Guardian-reading farmer". He made several attempts to be elected as a Labour MP. He married Sallie Caley on 11 February 1961. In May 1970, Sallie won Toynton St Peter division on Spilsby Rural District Council.

Sackur was educated at King Edward VI Grammar School, Spilsby, and Emmanuel College, Cambridge, where he gained a BA honours degree in history, and then joined Harvard University's John F. Kennedy School of Government as a Henry Fellow.

== Career ==
Sackur began working at the BBC as a trainee in 1986, and in 1990 he was appointed as one of its foreign affairs correspondents. As a BBC Radio correspondent, Sackur reported on the Velvet Revolution of Czechoslovakia in 1989 and the reunification of Germany in 1990. During the Gulf War, he was part of a BBC team covering the conflict and spent eight weeks as an embedded journalist with the British Army. At the end of the war, he was the first correspondent to report the massacre of the retreating Iraqi army on the road leading out of Kuwait.

Sackur was based in Cairo, Egypt, between 1992 and 1995 as the BBC's correspondent in the Middle East and he later moved to Jerusalem in 1995 until 1997. He covered both the assassination of Israeli Prime Minister Yitzhak Rabin and the growth of the Palestinian Authority under Yasser Arafat.

Between 1997 and 2002, Sackur was appointed the BBC's correspondent in Washington, D.C., and covered the Clinton-Lewinsky scandal. He later covered the U.S. presidential election in 2000 and interviewed President George W. Bush.

=== HARDtalk ===
In 2005, Sackur replaced Tim Sebastian as the regular host of the BBC's news programme HARDtalk. During his tenure he interviewed President Hugo Chávez of Venezuela, Teodoro Obiang of Equatorial Guinea, Thein Sein of Burma and others, the late prime minister Meles Zenawi of Ethiopia, and the spokesperson for the Tigray Defence Force, Getachew Reda. He also interviewed cultural figures including Gore Vidal, Annie Lennox, Charlize Theron, Vladimir Ashkenazy and William Shatner. In October 2024 the BBC announced that it was ending the programme for financial reasons, a decision that was much criticised.

Sackur was named "International TV Personality of the Year" by the Association for International Broadcasting (AIB) in November 2010. He was nominated as "Speech Broadcaster of the Year" at the Sony Radio Awards 2013. In July 2018, Sackur was awarded an Honorary Doctorate by the University of Warwick. Sackur has been a regular attendee and moderator at the Yalta European Strategy annual meetings founded and sponsored by Ukrainian oligarch Victor Pinchuk.

== Criticism ==
The Lemkin Institute for Genocide Prevention criticized Sackur for suggesting genocide as one of two "realistic options" for the Armenians of Nagorno-Karabakh during a HARDtalk interview with Ruben Vardanyan. Sackur had suggested the Armenians of the Republic of Artsakh either accept "a political deal or leave" due to the blockade of Nagorno-Karabakh. According to Lemkin Institute, Sackur had blamed the victims for the blockade: "Artsakh is under blockade not because of the genocidal designs of Azerbaijan, but because of some inexplicable stubbornness on the part of Armenians in Artsakh or their leaders – or both, as he seems to believe". The Lemkin Institute further criticized Sackur for trying to suggest the word Artsakh (the historical Armenian name for Nagorno-Karabakh) was illegitimate and for ignoring the rights of self-determination.

In March 2024, Sackur was widely criticized for tone and manner of questioning he adopted in an interview with Irfaan Ali, president of Guyana. Sackur asked Ali about the environmental impact of extracting Guyana’s offshore oil and gas reserves and accused Guyana of worsening climate change through adding to global carbon emissions. When Ali explained that Guyana is home to "a forest forever that is the size of England and Scotland combined...that stores 19.5 gigatonnes of carbon", Sackur continued to press his line of questioning aggressively and asked, what gives Guyana "the right to release all this carbon?" Ali replied, "We have the lowest deforestation rate in the world. And guess what? Even with our greatest exploration of the oil and gas resource we have now we will still be net zero, Guyana will still be net zero with all our exploration we will still be net zero." The interview gained widespread international attention as many in the media accused Sackur of Western hypocrisy regarding carbon emissions and condescension towards developing countries.
