= George Alagiah =

British newsreader and journalist (1955–2023)

George Alagiah OBE
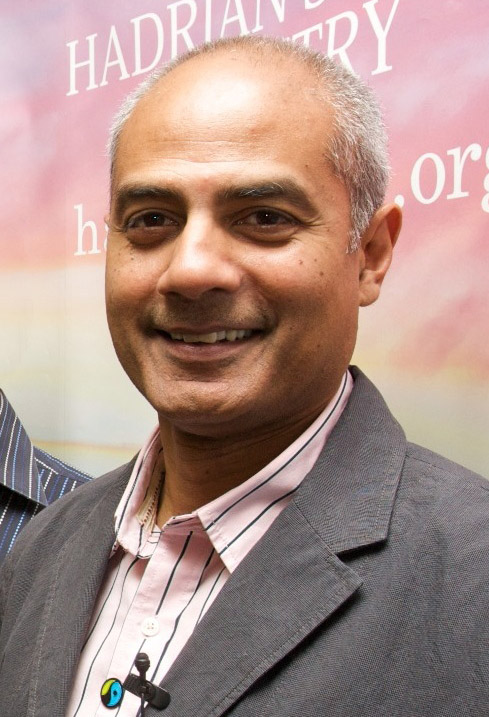
- Alagiah in 2009
- Born: George Maxwell Alagiah; 22 November 1955; Colombo, Ceylon (present day Sri Lanka)
- Died: 24 July 2023 (aged 67); London, England
- Education: Van Mildert College, Durham
- Occupations: Journalist; news presenter; newsreader; author
- Employer: BBC
- Notable credits: BBC News at Six; GMT; World News Today; BBC News; BBC World News
- Spouse: Frances Robathan (m. 1984)
- Children: 2

George Maxwell Alagiah (/ˌæləˈɡaɪə/; 22 November 1955 – 24 July 2023) was a British newsreader, journalist and television presenter for the BBC. From 2007 until 2022, he was the presenter of the BBC News at Six and the main presenter of GMT on BBC World News from its launch in 2010 until 2014. He was appointed Officer of the Order of the British Empire (OBE) in the 2008 New Year Honours.

== Early life and education ==
George Maxwell Alagiah was born in Colombo, Ceylon, on 22 November 1955. His parents, Donald Ratnarajah Alagiah (c. 1925–2013), a civil engineer, later a public health engineering consultant for the World Health Organization, and Therese Karunaiamma (née Santiapillai; died 1996), were Ceylon Tamils. In 1961, his parents moved to Ghana in West Africa, where he had his primary education at Christ the King International School. He had four sisters. His secondary education took place at St John's College, an independent Roman Catholic school in Portsmouth, England, after which he studied politics at Van Mildert College, Durham University. While at Durham, he wrote for and became editor of the student newspaper Palatinate and was a sabbatical officer of Durham Students' Union.

== Early career ==
In the 1980s, after leaving university, he worked for South Magazine, becoming Africa Editor.

Alagiah returned to his grandfather's original home in Sri Lanka in the aftermath of the 2004 Indian Ocean earthquake and tsunami to survey the damage. The family's former home had been destroyed, but he was able to recognise an old well where he had played with his sisters, although the well had become unsalvageable.

== Broadcasting career ==
Alagiah joined the BBC in 1989 after seven years in print journalism with South Magazine. Before becoming a presenter, he was Developing World correspondent, based in London, and then Southern Africa correspondent in Johannesburg. As one of the BBC's leading foreign correspondents, he reported on events ranging from the genocide in Rwanda to the plight of the Marsh Arabs in southern Iraq, as well as the civil wars in Afghanistan, Liberia, Sierra Leone, Kosovo, and Somalia.

In 1999, Alagiah became the deputy anchor of the BBC One O'Clock News and BBC Nine O'Clock News. He was the presenter of BBC Four News from its launch in 2002; the programme was later relaunched as The World and then another edition of World News Today. In January 2003 he joined the BBC Six O'Clock News, which he co-presented with Sophie Raworth until October 2005, and with Natasha Kaplinsky until October 2007. In December 2007, he became the sole presenter of the Six O'Clock News. In 2006, he began presenting World News Today on BBC World News and BBC Two, which was rebranded GMT on 1 February 2010. He last appeared on the programme in 2014. He was formerly a relief presenter on BBC News at Ten, presenting mainly Monday to Thursday when main presenters Huw Edwards and Fiona Bruce were unavailable. In October 2011, Alagiah presented Mixed Britannia, a three-part documentary series on the history of interracial marriage in the United Kingdom.

A specialist on Africa and the developing world, Alagiah interviewed, among others, Nelson Mandela, Archbishop Desmond Tutu, former Secretary-General of the United Nations Kofi Annan and President Robert Mugabe of Zimbabwe. His other documentaries and features include reports on why affirmative action in America is a "Lost Cause", for the Assignment programme, Saddam Hussein's genocidal campaign against the Kurds of northern Iraq for the BBC's Newsnight programme and a report on the last reunion of the veterans of Dunkirk.

== Awards and interests ==
In 2000, Alagiah was part of the BBC team which collected a BAFTA award for its coverage of the Kosovo conflict. He won numerous awards including Best International Report at the Royal Television Society in 1993, and in 1994 was the overall winner of the Amnesty International UK Media Awards. He was appointed Officer of the Order of the British Empire (OBE) in the 2008 New Year Honours for services to journalism.

His appearances at literary festivals included Cheltenham, Keswick, Hay-on-Wye and London, and he spoke at The Royal Geographical Society, the Royal Society of Arts and the Royal Overseas League. He was on the board of the Royal Shakespeare Company.

From 2002 to 2009, Alagiah was a patron of The Fairtrade Foundation, but in July 2009 he was obliged to resign by BBC Management, who claimed professional conflict of interest. Complaints were received at the BBC from members of the public who were unhappy that Alagiah had been asked to step down. The BBC responded that in keeping with its principles of impartiality, it would be inappropriate for one of its leading journalists to be seen supporting a movement that clearly represents a controversial view of global trade. He was also actively involved in supporting microfinance as a tool for development, including appearances in support of Opportunity International. He became a patron of Parenting UK in 2000.

In 2010, he received the Outstanding Achievement in Television award at The Asian Awards.

In 2020, his debut novel, The Burning Land, was shortlisted for a "Society of Authors" award. The book is described as a "gripping, pacy thriller about corruption and homicide in South Africa".

== Personal life ==
In April 1984, Alagiah married Frances Robathan, whom he met at Durham University. They had two children, Adam and Matthew, and lived in Stoke Newington, north London.

=== Illness and death ===
In April 2014, it was announced that Alagiah was being treated for colorectal cancer. A statement from the BBC said: "He is grateful for all the good wishes he has received thus far and is optimistic for a positive outcome." On 28 June, Alagiah announced on Twitter that he was making "encouraging progress". In late October 2015 he announced on Twitter that the treatment was officially over, and he returned to the BBC on 10 November. In January 2018 it emerged that the cancer had returned and he would undergo further treatment.

In March 2018, in an interview with The Sunday Times, Alagiah noted that his cancer was terminal and could have been caught earlier if the screening programme in England, which is automatically offered from the age of 60, was the same as that in Scotland, where it is automatically offered from the age of 50.

In June 2020, Alagiah said that the cancer had spread to his lungs, liver and lymph nodes, but was not at a "chronic" or "terminal" stage. He stated in an interview in January 2022 that his cancer would "probably get me in the end", but that he nonetheless felt "very lucky". In October 2022, Alagiah announced that his cancer had spread further; he subsequently took a break from television to undergo a new course of treatment.

Alagiah died on 24 July 2023, at the age of 67.

Media offices
Preceded by Moira Stuart	Deputy Presenter of BBC News at One; 1999–2002	Succeeded by Darren Jordon
Preceded by Huw Edwards	Main Presenter of BBC News at Six; 2003–2022	Succeeded by Vacant
New title	Main Presenter of GMT; 2010–2014	Succeeded by Vacant
