= Naga Munchetty =

British journalist and television presenter

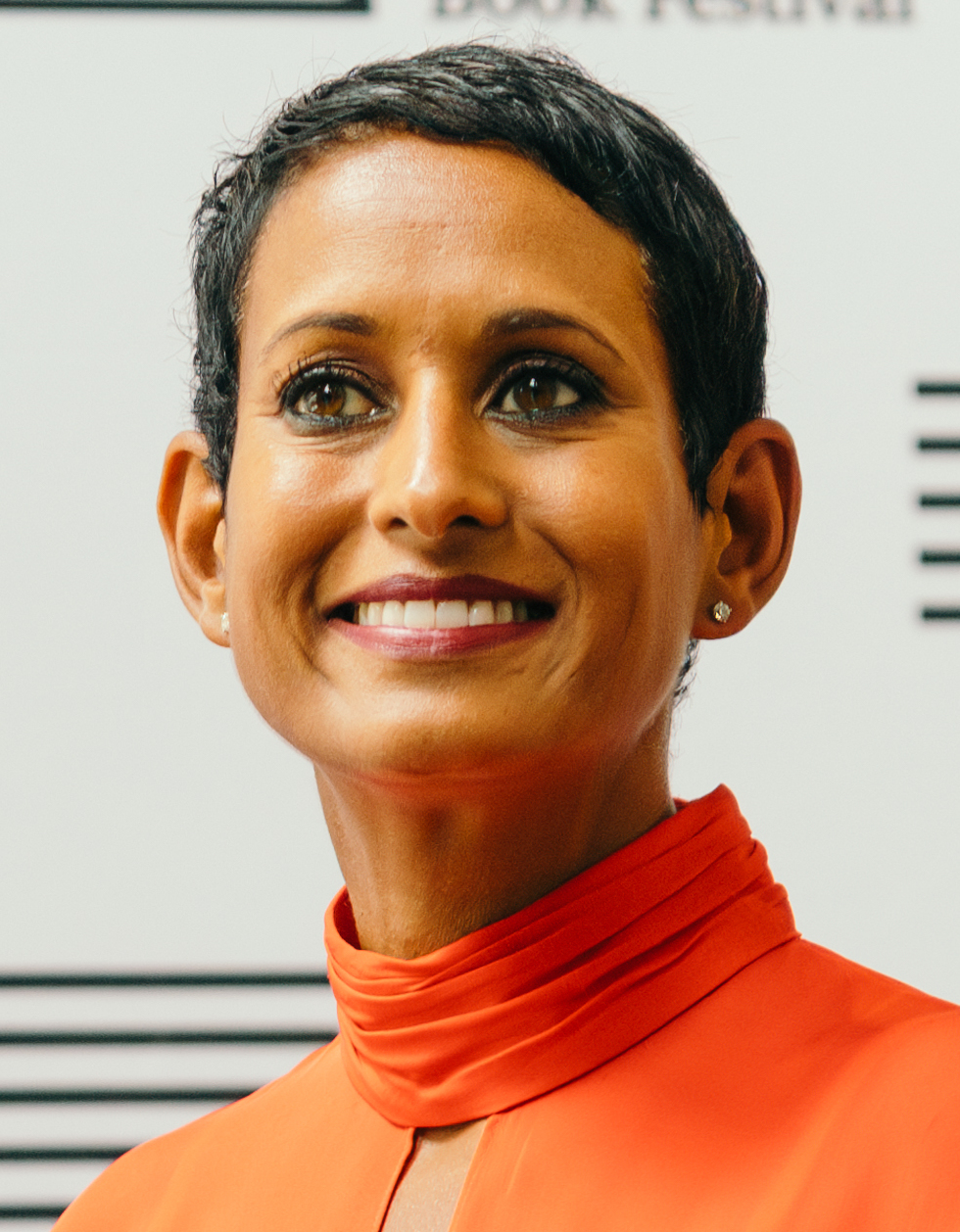
- Munchetty in 2025
- Born: Subha Nagalakshmi Munchetty-Chendriah; 25 February 1975 (age 51); Streatham, London, England
- Education: University of Leeds (BA)
- Occupations: Television presenter; journalist
- Notable credits: BBC Breakfast; BBC World News; BBC News; Newsnight; Working Lunch; Sunday Morning Live; Victoria Derbyshire; GMT; The Hub
- Spouse: James Haggar (m. 2004)

Subha Nagalakshmi Munchetty-Chendriah (born 25 February 1975), known professionally as Naga Munchetty, is a British television presenter, journalist and newsreader. She is a regular presenter of BBC Breakfast and has presented a range of BBC news and current affairs programmes, including BBC World News and BBC Two's weekday financial affairs programme Working Lunch. She also presents on BBC Radio 5 Live, where she co-hosts the television review podcast Must Watch with Scott Bryan and Hayley Campbell.

== Early life and career ==
Munchetty grew up in Leytonstone, Camberwell, Peckham and Streatham, south London. Her mother, Muthu, is from Tamil Nadu, India and her father is from Mauritius. They met when both were studying in Wales, her mother training to be a dentist and her father to be a nurse. They married in London in 1974, without the knowledge or approval of their parents. She has one sister, born in 1976. Her early education was at Graveney School, Tooting. In 1997, she took a BA in English from the University of Leeds. Her first job was as a journalist on the City pages of the Evening Standard. She also worked on the business section of The Observer.

== Career ==
Munchetty's television career began as a reporter for Reuters Financial Television, after which she worked as a senior producer for CNBC Europe, a business producer and reporter for Channel 4 News and a presenter on Bloomberg Television.

Munchetty joined BBC Two's Working Lunch after the show was revamped in October 2008 and stayed with the programme until it was cancelled in July 2010. Munchetty has hosted Radio 4's Money Box and has reported from the City for BBC News, covering stories such as the 2010 Budget and the pre-Budget report.

From August 2010, Munchetty presented early morning bulletins, formerly known as The World Today, alongside Sally Bundock on the BBC News channel, BBC One and BBC World News. She joined Breakfast in April 2009 as a stand-in presenter and has been a regular presenter since 2014, presenting with Charlie Stayt on Thursdays to Saturdays. From January 2021, Munchetty became the presenter on the 10am to 1pm Radio 5 Live programme on Mondays to Wednesdays replacing Emma Barnett, who moved to Radio 4's Woman's Hour. Munchetty co-hosted The Spending Review – The South Today Debate on BBC One with Sally Taylor in September 2010.

Munchetty presented Paranormal Investigation: Live on Living over 30–31 October 2010 to celebrate Halloween. Munchetty narrated the BBC documentary Fear and Faith in Paris looking at anti-Semitic attacks in Paris and their impact on the Jewish community in France. She won Celebrity Mastermind, which was broadcast in January 2013. In June 2016, she replaced Sian Williams as presenter of Sunday Morning Live on BBC One. In 2017, she was replaced by Emma Barnett and Sean Fletcher. On 26 August 2016, Munchetty presented an episode of Newsnight on BBC Two.

She was a contestant on the fourteenth series of Strictly Come Dancing, pairing with Pasha Kovalev, and was voted out in week four (on 16 October 2016). She co-presented Britain's Classroom Heroes with Sean Fletcher in October 2017.

In 2017, Munchetty joined the cast of CBBC sketch show Class Dismissed playing a fictionalised version of herself as a media studies teacher who acts like a newsreader. On Boxing Day 2022, Munchetty appeared on the BBC quiz show The Weakest Link. On 2 June 2023, and again on 8 December 2023, Munchetty hosted the BBC One panel show, Have I Got News for You.

In July 2026, it was announced that Munchetty would leave her presenting role on BBC Breakfast at the end of the year to become the presenter of the BBC Radio 5 Live early morning show, 5 Live Breakfast, from January 2027.

=== David Attenborough interview ===
A July 2018 Breakfast interview Munchetty did with David Attenborough went viral for its perceived awkwardness after Munchetty asked Attenborough, who had been invited to talk about Butterfly Conservation's Big Butterfly Count, unrelated questions about the British Royal family and the RRS Sir David Attenborough. Attenborough, visibly unimpressed, shut down nearly all of her questions.

=== Donald Trump comments ===
In September 2019, Munchetty was ruled to have breached BBC guidelines by criticising US President Donald Trump for perceived racism. That July, while presenting Breakfast with Dan Walker, Munchetty took issue with Trump's comments telling his opponents to "go back" to the "places from which they came". Munchetty said: "Every time I have been told, as a woman of colour, to go back to where I came from, that was embedded in racism. Now, I'm not accusing anyone of anything here, but you know what certain phrases mean".

The BBC was criticised for its decision to uphold complaints over Munchetty's comments. Several public figures, including Lenny Henry and Adrian Lester, signed an open letter, published in The Guardian, as "broadcasters and journalists of colour" asking the corporation to reconsider its ruling against her.

On 30 September 2019, it was reported in The Guardian that the complaint was also made against her co-host Dan Walker but his comments were not the focus of the BBC's Executive Complaints Unit investigation. Later that day, the Director-General of the BBC Tony Hall overturned the decision after looking into it personally.

== Personal life ==
Naga married ITV broadcast consultant James Haggar in 2004. The couple have lived in Rickmansworth, Hertfordshire since 2010. She previously dated Norwegian footballer Jonny Hansen. She is a trustee of a Rickmansworth theatre, Watersmeet, and a governor at St Joan of Arc Catholic School, Rickmansworth.

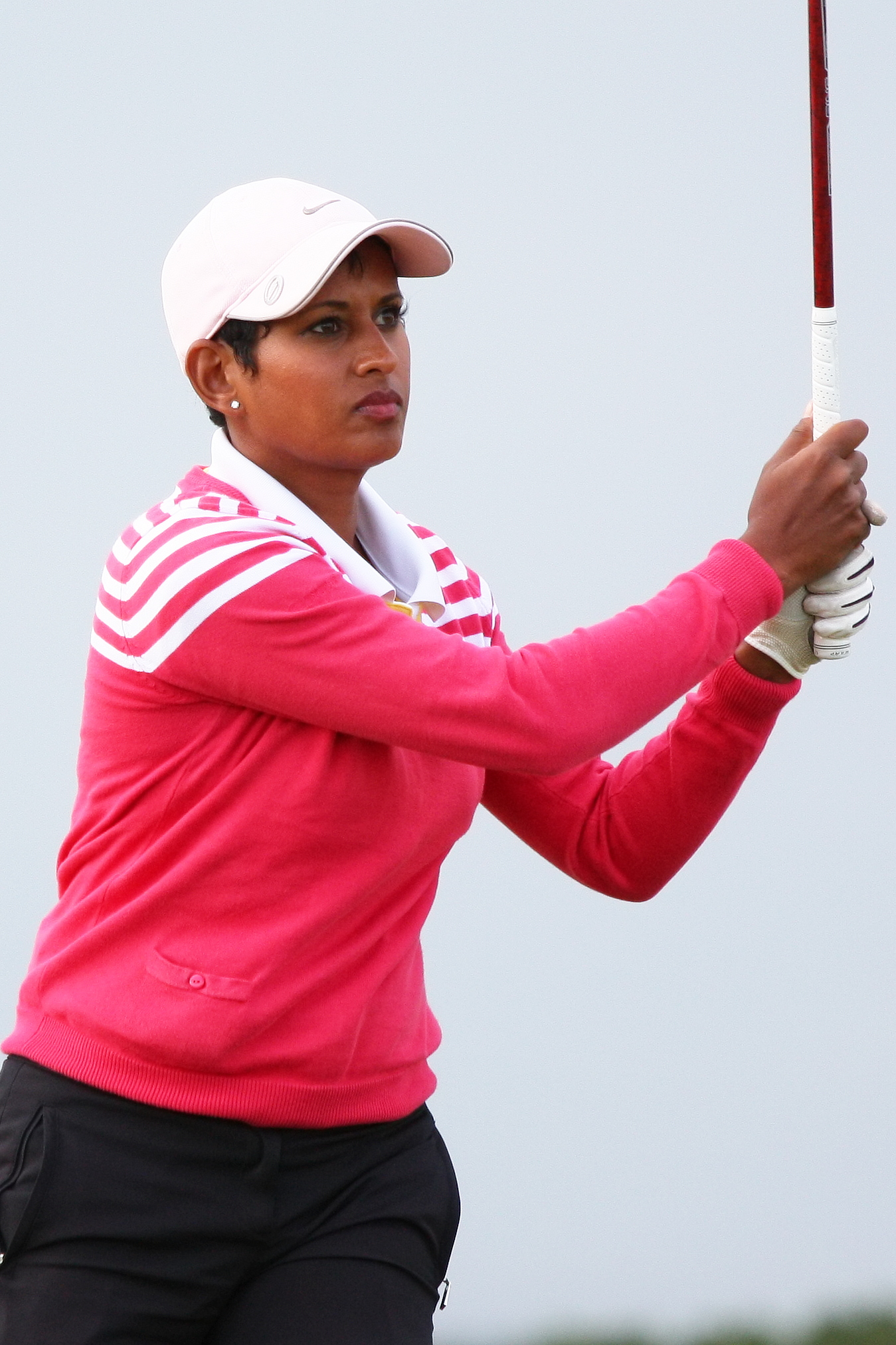
Munchetty in the pro-am round of the 2013 Women's British Open golf championships

Munchetty plays jazz trumpet and classical piano. She plays golf and had a handicap of nine in 2015. In April 2024, while talking to Paul Merton on the BBC Radio 4 programme Room 101, she revealed her handicap had gone down to six. In October 2012, she won the Hertfordshire de Paula Cup at Bishop's Stortford Golf Club. She has been a committee member of Moor Park Golf Club, where she has presented its charity golf day.

Munchetty was diagnosed with adenomyosis in September 2022 and revealed her diagnosis during her BBC Radio 5 Live programme in May 2023.
