= Mishal Husain =

British newsreader and journalist (born 1973)

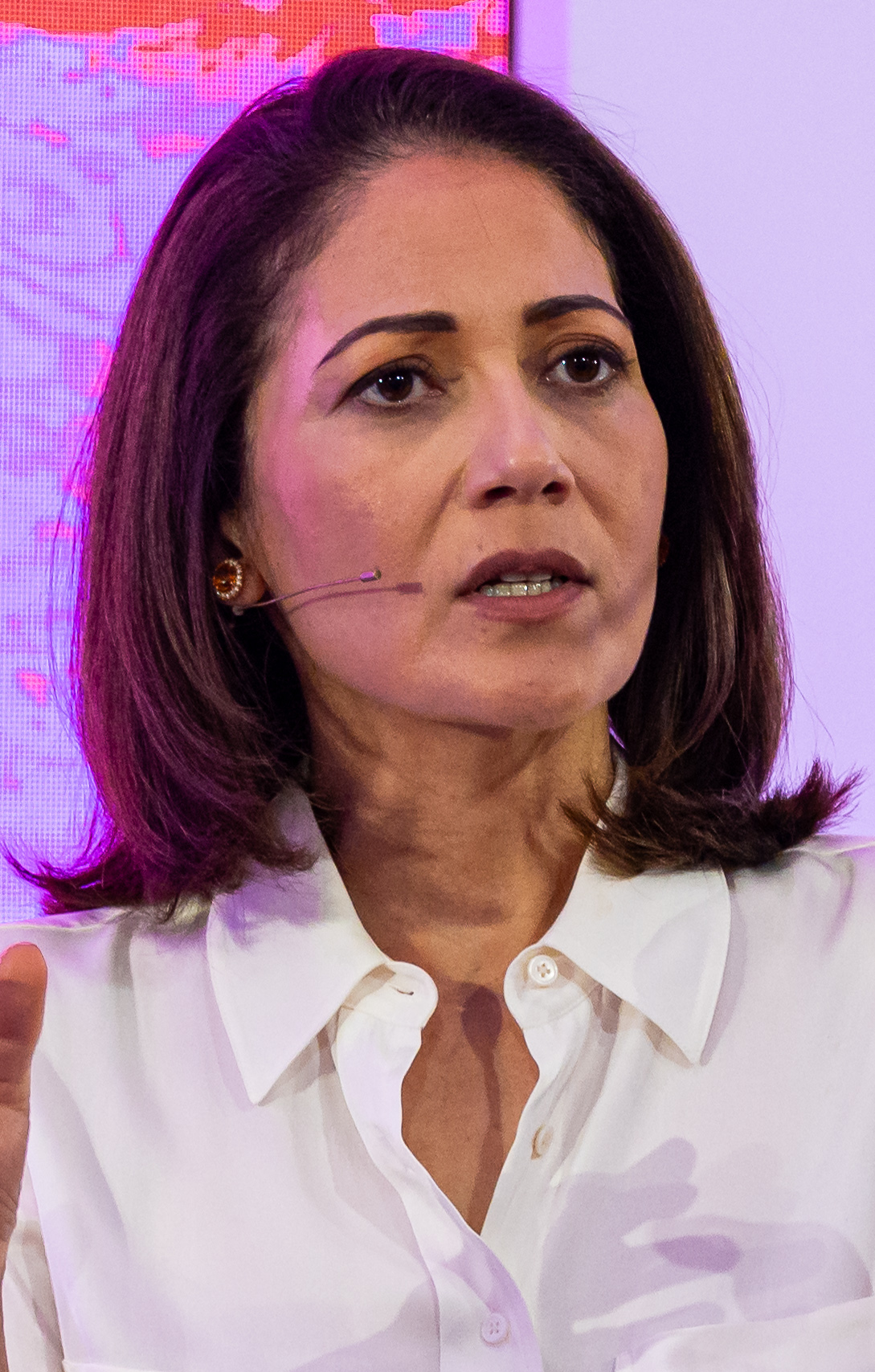
- Husain in 2025
- Born: 12 March 1973 (age 53); Northampton, England
- Education: New Hall, Cambridge (BA); European University Institute (LLM)
- Occupations: News presenter; journalist
- Notable credits: BBC Breakfast; BBC News at Six; BBC News at Ten; BBC Weekend News; The Andrew Marr Show; Impact; BBC World News; World News Today; HARDtalk; Today; Newsnight
- Spouse: Meekal Hashmi (m. 2003)
- Children: 3
- Website: news.bbc.co.uk/2/hi/programmes/impact_asia/presenters/default.stm

Mishal Husain (born 12 March 1973) is a British journalist, broadcaster and author.

She is an editor-at-large at Bloomberg, where she presents The Mishal Husain Show, a weekly podcast. She was previously a senior broadcaster at the BBC, where she presented its flagship morning show, BBC Radio 4's Today programme, for 11 years. During her time at the BBC, she also presented the BBC News at Ten and BBC News at Six. She also hosted The Andrew Marr Show, HARDtalk, Impact and BBC Breakfast.

== Early life ==
Mishal Husain was born on 12 March 1973 in Northampton, England, to Pakistani parents. Her father, Imtiaz Husain (1943–2016), from Lahore, was a physician who ended his career as a consultant urologist at Bedford Hospital. His parents were a doctor from Multan and Mary, an Anglo-Indian nurse. Mishal's mother, Shama, was a teacher and former producer for Pakistan Television Corporation, who was the daughter of Syed Shahid Hamid, the first Director-General of Pakistan's Inter-Services Intelligence.

Husain has a younger brother and began her private education at the British School in Abu Dhabi; the family were also based in Riyadh, Saudi Arabia, for a period. She returned to England at the age of twelve to continue her education at Cobham Hall School, an independent school in Cobham, Kent. She read law at the women-only New Hall, Cambridge (now Murray Edwards College, Cambridge), followed by a master's degree in International and Comparative Law at the European University Institute in Florence, Italy.

== Journalism career ==
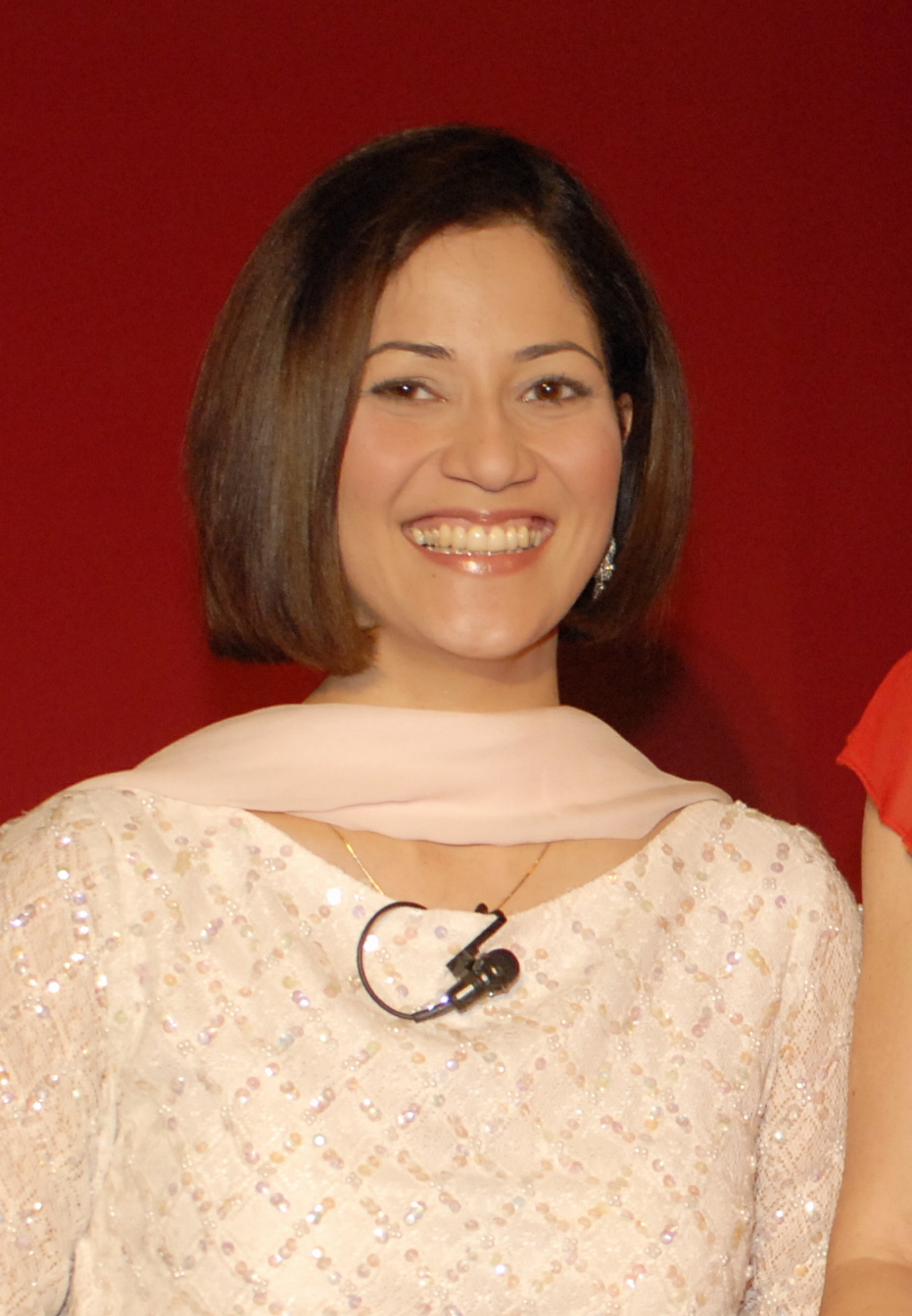
Husain in 2007

Husain gained her first experience in journalism at the age of 18, spending three months as a city reporter in Islamabad, Pakistan, at the English-language newspaper The News. Then, while at university, she did several stints at the BBC as work experience.

Her first job was at Bloomberg Television in London in 1996, where she was a producer and sometime presenter. Two years later, in 1998, she joined the BBC as a junior producer in the newsroom and for the News 24 channel, and then in the Economics and Business Unit. Within a few months, she moved in front of the camera and has since worked in a variety of roles: on the daily Breakfast programme, on Asia Business Report (based in Singapore), and as a presenter of business news on both BBC World News and the BBC News Channel. From September 2002 she was the corporation's Washington correspondent, serving as the main news anchor through the buildup to the invasion of Iraq and during the war. In May 2004, she joined BBC Breakfast as a main presenter on Fridays, Saturdays and Sundays, presenting with Bill Turnbull. She held this role until she went on maternity leave in May 2006. She didn't return to the programme, instead moving to BBC World and the BBC Weekend News. She has interviewed many high-profile figures including Paul Wolfowitz, Richard Armitage, Richard Perle, Paul Kagame and Emmerson Mnangagwa.

On 8 May 2010, she published an autobiographical essay in The Independent based on a nostalgia trip to the UAE. In 2011, Husain hosted Impact on BBC World News, but in the spring and summer of 2011 she was engaged in making a documentary on the Arab Spring, for airing in the autumn of 2011. She has presented the Sunday evening editions of the BBC Weekend News on BBC One.

On 17 March 2013, she presented the last News at Ten to be broadcast from BBC Television Centre. On 16 July 2013, the BBC's Director-General Lord Hall announced that Husain was to become a presenter of BBC Radio 4's Today programme in the autumn. Husain presented her first edition of Today on 7 October 2013, when her co-presenter was John Humphrys. On 7 November 2013, it was announced that Husain would be part of the BBC's Commonwealth Games Presenting team. Husain was also an occasional relief presenter of the BBC News at Six and the weekday edition of the BBC News at Ten, as well as on the BBC News Channel during major breaking news stories. She has occasionally presented Newsnight on BBC Two.

Husain won the Broadcaster of the Year Award at the London Press Club Awards in 2015.

On 27 November 2017, Husain recorded an interview with Prince Harry and Meghan Markle.

In June 2024, during the lead up to the 2024 UK general election, Husain was selected to chair and referee two televised debates on the BBC. At the first debate, the leaders of the seven largest UK political parties were invited, whilst the second was a head-to-head debate between Rishi Sunak, who was the UK Prime Minister and leader of the Conservative Party at the time, and Keir Starmer, leader of the Labour Party. Husain commented that she "saw the role as a privilege". Whilst both debates had considerable challenges, with Husain having to handle the latter being interrupted by protestors, about which she described as being another "aspect of our democracy", Husain was praised for her handling of both debates, with Tatler magazine describing Husain as 'the clear winner' of the debate and giving 'a masterclass in broadcasting', and The Times newspaper describing the performance as 'stunning', speculating Husain had emerged as a rival to Clive Myrie for lead anchor for the channel, following the departure of Huw Edwards.

In September 2024, Husain was criticised by some Jewish organisations who claimed the journalist failed to sufficiently challenge comments that they considered to be antisemitic during an interview on the Today programme with the Iranian-American academic and political analyst Mohammad Marandi. Marandi had been specifically invited to be asked about the Iranian view of the Israeli invasion of the Gaza Strip and any potential Iranian response, and the programme contained other interviews including those with Israel Defense Forces (IDF) spokesperson Lt Col Peter Lerner and US Diplomat Dennis Ross to get a broad perspective on the complex politics of the region. After the BBC reviewed the complaint, it issued a statement pointing out that “this was a live interview and he was challenged during the course of the interview, and the Israeli position was reflected," but on balance "however, we accept we should have continued to challenge his language throughout the interview.”

In November 2024, it was announced that Husain would be leaving the BBC to join Bloomberg News, where she will be the editor-at-large of Bloomberg Weekend, and presenting an interview series. Husain's final shift as Today co-presenter was on 17 December 2024, with several past and present Today presenters joining her in the studio to pay tribute.

In October 2025, Mishal Husain began presenting The Mishal Husain Show, which is a video-podcast, shown online and on Bloomberg Television.

== Other work and awards ==
When the first series of Star Spell – a spin-off from Hard Spell that had only appeared before as a one-off episode – aired, Husain appeared as word pronouncer, replacing Nina Hossain. She continued in this role throughout the second series of Hard Spell. Husain appeared in a round of the BBC's Celebrity Mastermind in 2010, coming third out of four. Her specialised subject was the Narnia books of C. S. Lewis.

She is also one of the judges for the Amnesty International Media Awards. She featured on a show entitled Gandhi that was broadcast by the BBC in March 2012. She also featured as the morning anchor presenter on BBC One during the 2012 Summer Olympics in London and the 2014 Commonwealth Games in Glasgow.

Husain is an ambassador for the charity Mosaic, which helps young people from deprived communities to realise their talents and potential.

In January 2014, Husain was awarded the Services to Media award at the British Muslim Awards.

Husain has written a book, The Skills, a guide for women on how to achieve their career goals. It was published in 2018, and was described as "the ultimate handbook for women".

In 2024, Husain published a memoir, Broken Threads: My Family From Empire to Independence. It hit the Sunday Times Bestsellers Chart under General Hardbacks.

In January 2025, Husain was elected as a Fellow of Kellogg College, University of Oxford.

== Personal life ==
In July 2003, Husain married Meekal Hashmi, a chief operating officer at an investment management firm. The couple have three sons, the eldest born in 2004, and twin boys born on 19 June 2006. They live in Camden, north London.

Amid widespread condemnation of the killing of Islamic State hostages in 2014, Husain voiced support for the use of social media to denounce its extremism. In an interview with the Radio Times, she urged Muslim scholars to use social media to condemn the Islamic State's attempt to draw support in the West or from British Islamic organisations through using videos of "horrific" brutality. Husain, who was the first Muslim presenter of BBC Radio 4's Today programme, said:

I think the Not in My Name campaign is a very positive development because outrage is shared by all right-thinking people. I would really like to see much more of the counterpoint from a theological perspective, with scholars taking to social media to refute the awful arguments we see put forward in those videos.

Media offices
| Preceded by Sarah Montague | Weekend presenter of BBC Breakfast; 2002–04 | Succeeded by Susanna Reid |
| Preceded by Fiona Bruce and Peter Sissons | Sunday presenter of BBC Weekend News; 2005–2022 | Incumbent |
| Preceded by James Naughtie | Today presenter 2013–present with John Humphrys, James Naughtie, Sarah Montague, Evan Davis, Justin Webb and Nick Robinson | Incumbent |
