= Daniela Ritorto =

Australian journalist

- Occupations: Journalist, presenter
- Notable credit(s): ABC News; BBC World News; Special Broadcasting Service

Daniela Ritorto is an Australian journalist, presenter, and communications consultant.

== Early life and education ==
Daniela Ritorto was born in Adelaide, South Australia.

== Career ==
Ritorto began work as a cadet for the Australian Broadcasting Corporation (ABC), as news presenter for 1062 ABC Riverland from 2003 until 2004, when she moved to South Australian politics for ABC News. She then became a political reporter for Network Ten.

Ritorto moved to London around 2011 to work for BBC World News, where she hosted a variety of programmes, including the main weekend overnight presenter of BBC World News which is broadcast on BBC News in the UK, around the world on BBC World News channel, and on public television in America, live from the "World's Newsroom in London". She also acted as the London presenter of Newsday, World News Today, and Outside Source, on a relief basis.

In January 2016 she returned to Australia, after five years of service at the BBC, initially settling in Canberra.

She returned to Adelaide in 2018 and was the media and communications manager for energy company Santos Limited], before leaving in 2019.

Ritorto was appointed chief political correspondent and Parliament House bureau chief for the Special Broadcasting Service (SBS).

== Other activities ==
Ritorto was a member of the Adelaide Festival board until January 2026, when she resigned following the Adelaide Writers' Week boycott.

== Personal life ==
Ritorto married to ALP politician and Minister for Health and Aged Care Mark Butler.
