= Jon Sopel =

British journalist (born 1959)

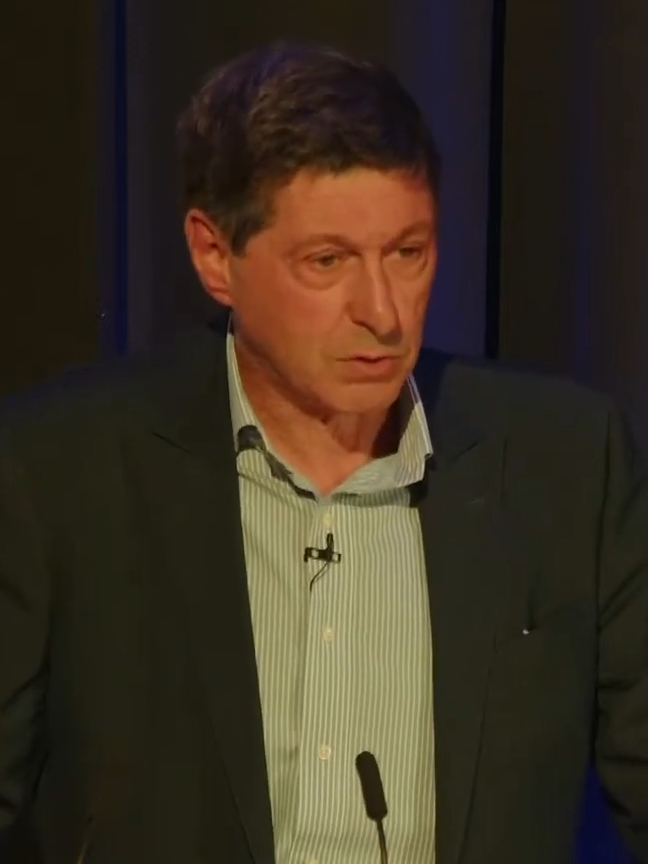
- Sopel in 2022
- Born: Jonathan Berris Sopel; 22 May 1959 (age 67); London, England
- Education: Christ's College, Finchley
- Alma mater: University of Southampton
- Occupations: News editor, television producer, newsreader
- Notable credit(s): BBC News; Politics Show; Global; BBC World News
- Title: Former North America editor of BBC News
- Spouse: Linda Twissell (m. 1988)
- Children: 2

Jonathan Berris Sopel (born 22 May 1959) is a British journalist, television presenter and podcaster. He was formerly BBC News's North America editor; chief political correspondent for the domestic news channel BBC News; a presenter on the Politics Show on BBC One and the BBC News channel; and from 2013 to 2014, the main presenter of Global on BBC World News. Since 2022, he has been presenting the Global daily news podcast The News Agents.

== Early life ==
Born in 1959 to Jewish parents Myer and Miriam Sopel, his family moved from Stepney to Finchley, North London when he was eleven. He was educated at Christ's College, Finchley before graduating with a 2:1 honours degree in politics and sociology from University of Southampton. Sopel was the president of Southampton University Students' Union in 1981–1982, having stood for election representing the National Organisation of Labour Students.

== Career ==
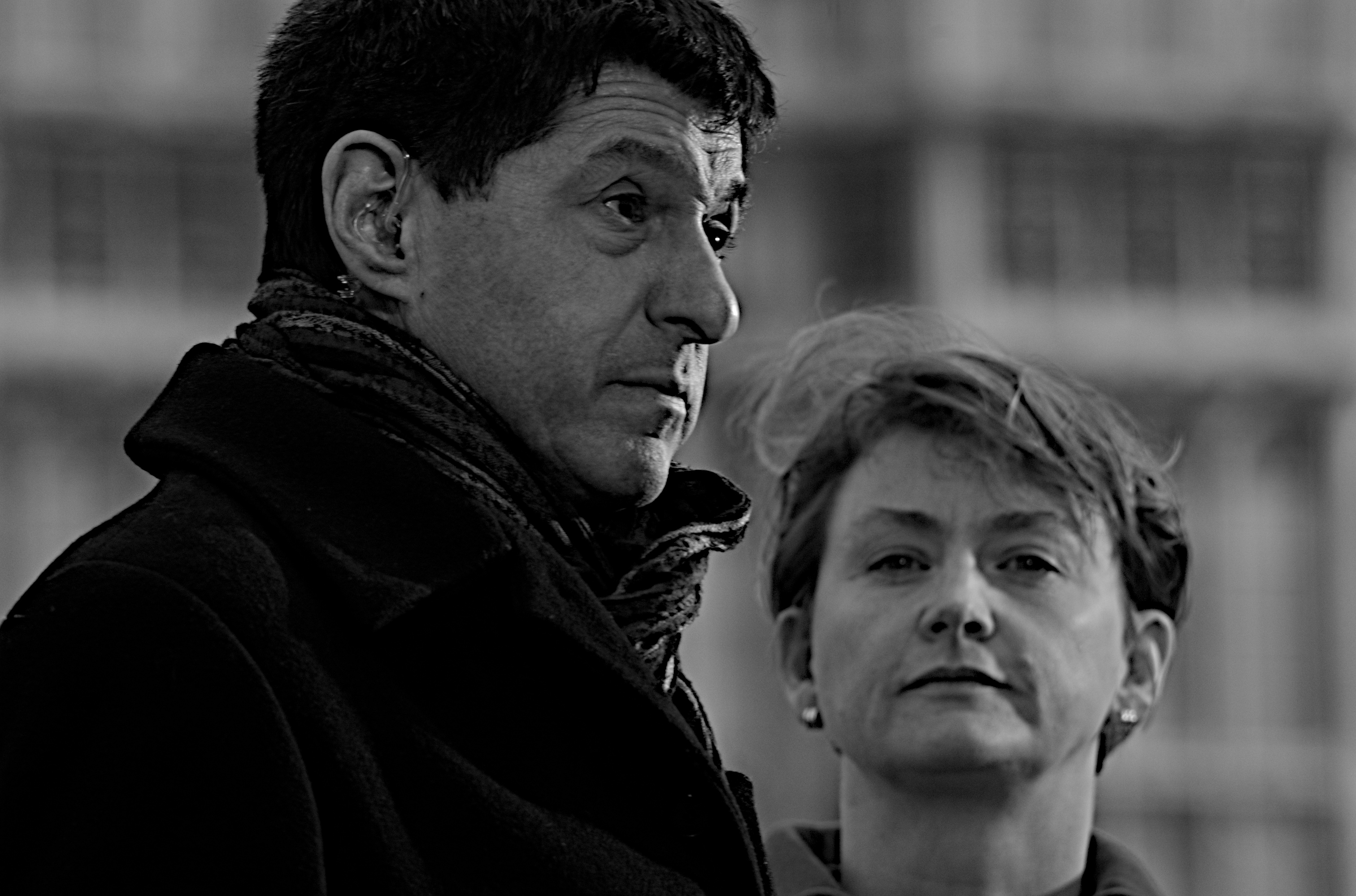
Sopel during an outside broadcast for BBC News 24 with Yvette Cooper.

Sopel was a freelance writer and broadcaster before joining the BBC in 1983 as a reporter and producer for BBC Radio Solent. He went on to become the chief political correspondent for BBC News 24 and later spent three years as the BBC's Paris correspondent. Stories he covered while he was in Paris included the French ban on the importation of British beef, the millennium celebrations in Paris, the oil spill in Brittany, the French presidency of the EU in 2000 and the Concorde crash in July 2000. During the 2003 invasion of Iraq, Sopel was the BBC's correspondent in Kuwait City. In 2005, Sopel joined The Politics Show on BBC One replacing Jeremy Vine as the programme's main presenter. It broadcast every Sunday at noon and Sopel interviewed key politicians and advisers, including Prime Minister Tony Blair, opposition leader David Cameron, Jack Straw, Gordon Brown and US Secretary of State Condoleezza Rice. The show ended in December 2011 and was replaced by Sunday Politics in January 2012.

Sopel has co-presented the BBC News channel on weekday afternoons between 2 pm and 5 pm – alongside Louise Minchin each Tuesday to Thursday and alongside Emily Maitlis on Mondays – following his appointment as a presenter on the channel in 2003. During major political stories, such as elections, Sopel reported on location for the BBC News Channel and BBC News at One. He made occasional appearances on BBC One news bulletins as a relief anchor. In his 16 years with the BBC, he has appeared on PM on Radio Four, Breakfast News, BBC News at One, BBC News at Six and BBC News at Ten as well as fronting BBC Two's annual coverage of the UK political party conferences, Conference Live. He has also been an occasional stand-in presenter for Newsnight, and has made past appearances on Breakfast, HARDtalk and The Daily Politics. In October 2012, it was announced that Sopel would present the new programme Global with Jon Sopel, airing 15:00 to 16:30 GMT every Monday to Thursday on BBC World News.

In January 2014, Sopel had a rare interview with the Emir of Dubai, Sheikh Mohammed bin Rashid Al Maktoum. At the end of the following April, Sopel was appointed the BBC's North America editor, after his predecessor Mark Mardell became a presenter for BBC Radio 4. In 2019, BuzzFeed News revealed that Sopel gave a paid confidential speech to Philip Morris International (the maker of Marlboro cigarettes) at a staff conference in Miami. This was criticised by British lung cancer charities.

In 2020, Sopel began presenting the BBC podcast Americast alongside Newsnight presenter Emily Maitlis and chief North America reporter Anthony Zurcher. The podcast originally focused on the 2020 election, containing analysis as well as an array of interviews from across the political scene. Americast received positive reviews and performed well on the iTunes chart, at times becoming the UK's most listened to podcast of any genre. The series was originally meant to end after the 2020 election, but has continued due to its popularity. An edited version of the podcast is broadcast on BBC Radio 4.

In October 2021, Sopel announced his departure as North America editor, saying he was taking a "long break" to write a book. In November 2021, his successor was announced as Sarah Smith. In February 2022, Sopel announced he would be leaving the BBC after an exclusive signing with LBC to launch a new podcast and joint radio show with fellow presenter Emily Maitlis. The News Agents, featuring Sopel, Maitlis and Lewis Goodall was launched in August 2022.

Since September 6 2026 he joined Sky News for Sunday Morning with…

== Personal life ==
Sopel is an ambassador for The King's Trust. He met his wife, Linda Twissell, whom he married in 1988, while working at Radio Solent; the couple have a son and daughter and live in North London. In October 2010, Sopel required surgery to his hip after he crashed his motor scooter. He supports Tottenham Hotspur.

== Awards ==
In 2007, Sopel was voted 'Political Journalist of the Year' by the Public Affairs Industry. Sopel was awarded an Honorary Doctorate of Letters by the University of Southampton in 2011. In 2013, Sopel was shortlisted for 'National Presenter of the Year' at the Royal Television Society television journalism awards 2011/2012. In 2016 Sopel was appointed Pro-Chancellor of the University of Southampton.

== Publications ==
- Tony Blair: The Moderniser. Michael Joseph. 1995. ISBN 978-0-553-50387-6.
- If Only They Didn't Speak English: Notes from Trump's America. BBC Books. 2017. ISBN 978-1-78594-226-6.
- A Year At The Circus: Inside Trump's White House. BBC Books. 2019. ISBN 978-1-78594-437-6.
- UnPresidented: Politics, pandemics and the race that Trumped all others. BBC Books. 2021. ISBN 978-1-78594-440-6.
- Strangeland: How Britain stopped making sense. Ebury Press. 2024. ISBN 978-1-52993-840-1.

Media offices
New title	Main Presenter of Global; 2013–2014	Succeeded by Matthew Amroliwala
Preceded by Mark Mardell	North America Editor: BBC News; 2014–2021	Succeeded by Sarah Smith
