= Dani Sinha =

British broadcast journalist and presenter

- Born: Liverpool, England
- Occupations: Journalist, Presenter
- Notable credit(s): BBC South Today, BBC London News, BBC News, BBC World News, World News Today, 5 News

Dani Sinha (/ˈsɪnhɑː/) is a British broadcast journalist and presenter, best known for her work on BBC World News and South Today. Since 2015 she has worked as a presenter reporter for 5 News on Channel 5.

Sinha studied French and Latin at the University of Bristol before taking a postgraduate diploma in broadcast journalism at City University London.

== Broadcasting career ==
Sinha worked as a producer at BBC Radio Berkshire before presenting herself. In 2006, Sinha began presenting on BBC South Today. and has covered several major stories for both South Today and BBC News.

Sinha briefly joined BBC London in 2008 as a BBC London News presenter, before returning to South Today as a regular presenter, as well as doing occasional presenting for BBC London News, the BBC News Channel and BBC World News. In 2015 she moved to ITN to work as a presenter and reporter for 5 News.

== Personal life ==
Sinha was born in Liverpool, North West England to an Indian father and an Irish mother. She has spent most of her adult life in the South of England. Her father was a GP and her mother was a teacher for the deaf. Sinha has worked as a patron for the Hampshire-based Open Sight charity for those with blindness and impaired sight.
