= GMT (TV programme) =

News programme

- GMT with George Alagiah
- Also known as: GMT with Lucy Hockings (2014–2019); GMT with Stephen Sackur (2010–2019)
- Created by: BBC World News
- Presented by: Lucy Hockings (2014–2019); Stephen Sackur (2010–2019)
- Country of origin: United Kingdom
- Original language: English

Production
- Production locations: Studio B and C, Broadcasting House, London
- Running time: 2 x 30 minutes 1 x 60 minutes

Original release
- Network: BBC World News
- Release: 1 February 2010 – 1 November 2019

Related
- World News Today; Live with Lucy Hockings; BBC World News; BBC World News America; Newsday; Impact; Global; Focus on Africa; World News Today

GMT is a news programme that aired weekdays on BBC World News between 1 February 2010 and 1 November 2019. The programme's main presenters were Lucy Hockings and Stephen Sackur, rotated depending on the edition because (as of 2016, original presenter George Alagiah was on leave from his anchor duties on GMT), with Tim Willcox serving as a primary relief presenter.

Each programme began with the presenter providing an in-depth lead story, giving the time in that part of the world; the program also featured other reports of moderate length focusing on political, social, health and human rights issues, business and sport news, as well as a brief summary of other news headlines from around the world (however, the programme does not emphasize 'headlines' from BBC World News). Its title apparently refers to Greenwich Mean Time, as the programme commences at 12:00 GMT. It was also the first program to be broadcast from the Broadcasting House on 14 January 2013 at 12:00 GMT.

== Schedule ==
GMT aired three times a day (09:00-09:30 GMT, 11:00-11:30 GMT and 12:00-13:00 GMT) each Monday through Friday on BBC World News. The programme acted as a morning programme for North America and South America, a daytime/afternoon programme for Europe, Middle East and Africa, an evening programme for Asia, and a late night/early morning programme for Australia and Oceania. The programme featured analysis and discussion of the top news stories of the day and also previewed the exclusive reports, correspondent feature films and interviews planned on BBC World News programme BBC World News America at 00:00 GMT later that day. In the United States, the first half-hour of the 12:00 GMT segment of the program was also syndicated to PBS member stations and select non-commercial educational independent stations through a distribution agreement between BBC World News and Los Angeles public independent KCET.

=== BBC Two simulcast ===
From 6 September 2010, a 27-minute segment was shown on BBC Two in the UK on Mondays, Tuesdays, Thursdays and Fridays at 12:30 GMT, replacing Working Lunch. Originally an edition of World Business Report was shown at 12:40 GMT, though this was changed for BBC Two viewers to feature a four-minute-long business update. There was no Wednesday edition during Parliament, because of a 90-minute-long edition of The Daily Politics to cover Prime Minister's Questions. The BBC Two simulcast was ended at the end of 2011, and was replaced in 2012 by an extended edition of The Daily Politics. An edition of BBC World News was shown instead on BBC Two at 11:30, this was replaced in 2015 with BBC Newsroom Live.

== Presenters ==
	Presenter	Current Role
2014–2019	Lucy Hockings	Main Presenter (Monday-Thursday)
2010–2019	Stephen Sackur	Main Presenter (Friday)
2010–2019	David Eades	Relief Presenter
2010–2019	Tim Willcox	Relief Presenter
2013–2019	Kate Silverton	Relief Presenter
2013–2019	Babita Sharma	Relief Presenter
2013–2019	Alice Baxter	Relief Presenter
2013–2019	Karin Giannone	Relief Presenter
2013–2019	Kasia Madera	Relief Presenter
2015–2019	Philippa Thomas	Relief Presenter
2015–2019	Nuala McGovern	Relief Presenter
2018–2019	Samantha Simmonds	Relief Presenter

=== Former ===
- George Alagiah (2010–2014)
- Zeinab Badawi (2010–2014)
- Jonathan Charles (2010–2011)
- Komla Dumor (2011–2014; served until his death)
- Naga Munchetty (2011–2014; moved to Salford to present BBC Breakfast)
- Ros Atkins (2013–2014)
- Rajesh Mirchandani (2013–2014)
