= BBC News at One =

Daily news programme on BBC News

- Title card used since 3 April 2023
- Also known as: BBC One O'clock News (1986–2008); BBC News at One O'Clock (2001–2004)
- Created by: BBC News
- Presented by: Nina Warhurst
- Theme music composer: George Fenton (1986–1999); David Lowe (1999–present)
- Country of origin: United Kingdom
- Original language: English

Production
- News editor: Richard Frediani
- Production locations: BBC Television Centre (1986–2013); Broadcasting House, London (2013–2024); BBC Quay House, Salford (2024–present)
- Running time: 60 minutes (from 2024); 30 minutes (until 2024)
- Production company: BBC News

Original release
- Network: BBC One; BBC News (UK feed)
- Release: 27 October 1986 – present

Related
- BBC Breakfast; BBC News at Six; BBC News at Ten; BBC Weekend News

The BBC News at One is the BBC's afternoon news programme on British television channels BBC One without British Sign Language Interpretation and the BBC News channel with British Sign Language Interpretation, broadcast weekdays at 1:00 pm and produced by BBC News. The programme runs for 60 minutes, including a ten-minute regional news bulletin at approximately 1:35 pm. The programme is currently presented by Nina Warhurst. A pool of presenters from across BBC Breakfast and BBC News appear in Warhurst's absence.

The BBC News at One achieved an average reach of 2.7 million viewers per bulletin in 2007, making it the most watched programme on UK daytime television. During the COVID-19 pandemic, audiences reached 4.2 million viewers in 2020.

== History ==
BBC One O'clock News with Martyn Lewis in 1986

The One O'clock News launched on 27 October 1986 as part of the new daytime television service on BBC1. It replaced News After Noon, which had been the BBC's weekday lunchtime news programme for the previous five years. Martyn Lewis, who had joined the BBC from rival ITN, was the original presenter of the new One O'clock News, in a single-presenter format. Michael Buerk took over as main presenter in October 1987 when Martyn Lewis left to present the Nine O'Clock News. Philip Hayton acted as main relief presenter from when the programme began, and took over as main anchor in October 1988 when Michael Buerk left to present the Nine O'Clock News along with Martyn Lewis in a single-presenter format. Martyn Lewis and Michael Buerk, the main anchors of the Nine, along with Anna Ford, acted as relief presenters during this period.

A unified look across BBC news output was introduced on 13 April 1993 from the BBC's studio N2, and the programme, while retaining the One O'Clock News title, adopted the Silicone graphics computer look, which distorted the image into Virtual Reality, a real studio did exist with changeable panels behind the newsreaders, dependent upon the bulletins, made up of three 1 metre, three 1.5 metre, and three 3 metre panels, these being kept in storage racks in N2. The programme still kept some of its individuality, such as a reworked version of the theme music, again by George Fenton, with the newer version being performed by the BBC Concert Orchestra at Abbey Road Studios. John Tusa and Edward Stourton took over as main presenters at this time. Tusa left the bulletin in 1996, with Stourton taking over as main presenter, and Justin Webb becoming deputy presenter a year later. Anna Ford, who would later become lead anchor of the programme, would also occasionally stand in as presenter.

According to the TV studio history website, N1, was the former World Service studio next door to N2, were both closed around 1998/1999 when the new News Centre opened in Stage 6, understanding – becoming the "property" of BBC Resources, which renamed N1 to TC10 and N2 to TC11, and that Resources could not afford to refurbish them. Both studios were unused for a couple of years.

A new look across all of BBC News television output on 10 May 1999 meant that for the first time all the main bulletins on BBC One had the same look, the only exception being the title of the programme. At this time Anna Ford took over as the main presenter of the bulletin in 1999, staying until her retirement from newsreading in April 2006. George Alagiah became deputy presenter at the same time until early 2002 when he became the presenter of BBC Four News. Darren Jordon took over from George Alagiah as deputy presenter until late 2006. Following Ford's retirement, Sophie Raworth became lead anchor.

On 22 January 2007, the programme titles were relaunched, along with the rest of the BBC television output, to give an identical series of titles across news programming on all BBC channels.

Between February and August 2008, Kate Silverton took over as main presenter while Sophie Raworth was on maternity leave. After this Kate Silverton became deputy presenter.

On 4 February 2008, the programme temporarily moved studios, from N6 to N8 (the former BBC News 24 studio), as part of restructuring across BBC News. On 21 April 2008 the programme underwent a graphical refresh and returned to the refurbished N6, and was now known as the BBC News at One.

On 5 November 2010, during the National Union of Journalists strike action, former Sky News and GMTV presenter Emma Crosby presented the programme whilst the regular presenters were absent. Further strike dates occurred on 15 July 2011 and 1 August 2011 plus on 28 March 2013. Gavin Grey presented on these days in addition to BBC News Channel.

On 18 March 2013, the programme moved to Broadcasting House, along with the BBC News channel and the other BBC One bulletins, and began broadcasting in high-definition. The programme was the first to be broadcast from the new studio.

Between January and June 2015, the bulletin was extended to 40 minutes due to the length of the English regional bulletins being reduced to 5 minutes during the general election campaign period. Scotland, Wales and Northern Ireland retained the original 30-minute broadcast length and aired their regular 15-minute bulletins.

From 23 March 2020, Simon McCoy took the role as the Monday-Wednesday presenter, following the end of the BBC's Afternoon Live, Jane Hill continued to present on Thursdays, with her sharing the role on Fridays with Kate Silverton. Raworth ceased to present the bulletin and appeared exclusively as a main anchor of the BBC News at Six and BBC News at Ten.

On 25 March 2021, Simon McCoy left the BBC after 17 years at the network. He presented his final BBC News at One on the same day. Since McCoy's departure, the programme has dispensed with a main presenter, with a team of established BBC journalists presenting the programme on rotation.

On 14 March 2023, BBC News at One used Studio B at the Broadcasting House for the first time to include a completely new studio and presentation. However, unlike the BBC News at Six and Ten, Studio E was still in use regularly for the bulletin, until the main launch.

On 15 May 2023, two months after the first trial, BBC News at One moved to Studio B permanently to follow the same format as the BBC News at Six and Ten using the new presentation, graphics, titles and the new handover to the nations and regions.

On 29 November 2023, it was announced that as part of a series of changes within BBC News, BBC News at One would move from London to MediaCityUK in Salford, and be extended from 30 minutes to one hour, making it the first regular national news bulletin on the BBC to broadcast regularly from outside London. The first hour-long programme was broadcast on 3 June 2024. The bulletin has since occasionally continued to use the London studio on Weekends and Bank Holidays. It was later announced that, from April 2025, Nina Warhurst would leave her role as the business presenter on BBC Breakfast to be the lead presenter of the BBC News at One.

== Presenters ==
=== Current presenters ===
| Years | Presenter | Role |
|---|---|---|
| 2024–present | Nina Warhurst | Main Presenter |
| 2014–present | Ben Brown | Deputy Presenter |
| 2024–present | Jon Kay | Relief Presenter |
| 2024–present | Sally Nugent | Relief Presenter |
| 2024–present | Lewis Vaughan Jones | Relief Presenter |
| 2025–present | Sarah Campbell | Relief Presenter |
| 2025–present | Ben Thompson | Relief Presenter |
| 2025–present | Luxmy Gopal | Relief Presenter |
| 2026–present | Karin Giannone | Relief Presenter |

=== Former presenters ===
Presenters below are occasional or relief presenters unless indicated otherwise.

- Martyn Lewis (Main presenter, 1986–1987)
- Philip Hayton (Main presenter, 1986–1993)
- Michael Buerk (Main presenter 1987–1988)
- John Tusa (Main presenter, 1993–1996)
- Edward Stourton (Main presenter, 1993–1999)
- Justin Webb (Main presenter, 1997–1999)
- Anna Ford (Main presenter, 1999–2006)
- Sophie Raworth (Main presenter, 2006–2020)
- Simon McCoy (Main presenter, 2020–2021; relief presenter, 2008–2020)
- Anna Foster (Main presenter, 2024–2025)
- George Alagiah (Deputy presenter, 1999–2001)
- Darren Jordon (Deputy presenter, 2001–2006)
- Louise Minchin (Deputy presenter, 2006–2008; relief presenter 2008–2012)
- Kate Silverton (Deputy presenter, 2008–2015; relief presenter 2015–2021)
- Laurie Mayer (1986–1993)
- John Humphrys (1988–1996)
- Jennie Bond (1993–1999)
- Jill Dando (1993–1995)
- Sian Williams (2001–2013)
- Jane Hill (2003–2024)
- Bill Turnbull (2003–2006)
- Natasha Kaplinsky (2005–2007)
- Emily Maitlis (2007–2013)
- Jon Sopel (2010–2014)
- Matthew Amroliwala (2012–2014)
- Reeta Chakrabarti (2014–2024)
- Clive Myrie (2014–2024)
- Joanna Gosling (2019–2022)
- Victoria Derbyshire (2021–2022)
- Martine Croxall (2021–2022)
- Katya Adler (2023–2024)
- Maryam Moshiri (2023–2024)
- Lucy Hockings (2023–2024)
- Ben Boulos (2025–2026)

== One O'Clock News Hour ==
The BBC News at One has been shown on the BBC News channel since April 2006, making up the first half-hour of the BBC News at One. During the headlines and "coming up" section, BBC One viewers see a preview of the stories to come from their region, while BBC News viewers see sports headlines. Between 1 pm and 2 pm BBC News has a service providing in-vision British Sign Language for viewers who are deaf or hard of hearing. The programme ends with a full national weather forecast, which is presented from within the studio.

Between 2006 and 2017, significant differences could be seen between the two-halves of the programme, as the second half was originally presented by the Duty News Channel presenter. It also featured an extended Sport Today and World Business Report. On 28 June 2021, a new regional round up called Across the UK was introduced looking at stories from the nations and regions.

Previously, BBC One broadcast a 15-minute standalone regional news bulletin at 1:30 pm, which immediately followed the News at One. Since the programme's extension to an hour in 2024, the regional lunchtime bulletins are aired for 10 minutes at around 1:35 pm, while news channel viewers get Sportsday, before returning to the programme for the rest of the hour, continuing to use their respective lunchtime news titles.

== See also ==
- ITV Lunchtime News
