= Yalda Hakim =

Australian journalist (born 1983)

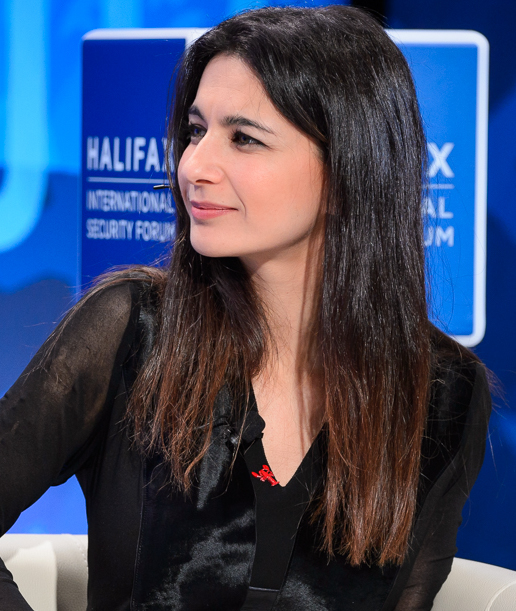
- Hakim at the Halifax International Security Forum 2017
- Born: 26 June 1983 (age 43); Kabul, Afghanistan
- Citizenship: Australia; United Kingdom
- Education: Macquarie University (BA)
- Occupations: Journalist; news presenter; documentary maker
- Employer(s): Sky News; BBC (previously)
- Notable credit(s): BBC World News; Our World; Newsnight; BBC News; Impact with Yalda Hakim; Dateline
- Spouse: Abed Rashid
- Children: 1

Yalda Hakim (born 26 June 1983) is an Afghan-born Australian broadcast journalist, Lead World News presenter for Sky News, and documentary maker. She was one of the chief presenters at BBC News broadcasting in English in the UK and globally. After her family left Afghanistan and settled in Australia in 1986, she grew up in the western Sydney suburb of Parramatta and went on to study journalism. She started her career at SBS Television, moving to BBC TV in 2012. In July 2023, she left the BBC to join Sky News.

== Early life and education ==
Hakim was born on 26 June 1983 in Kabul, in then DR Afghanistan. Her family fled the country during the Soviet–Afghan War when she was six months old. The family travelled on horseback overland to Pakistan with the help of people smugglers. After two years in Pakistan, the family settled in Australia as migrants in 1986, when she was three years old.

Hakim attended Macarthur Girls High School in Parramatta, Sydney, where she played the violin and became a sports captain and prefect. She also attended Parramatta West Public School.

Hakim went on to study for a Bachelor of Arts degree in Media from 2002 to 2004 at Macquarie University, where she was also a board member of the Macquarie University Union.

In 2005, Hakim received a Diploma in Journalism at Macleay College, Sydney. She then went on to study a Bachelor of Arts in Journalism via distance education at Monash University from 2007 to 2009, in addition to a cadetship at the Special Broadcasting Service.

Hakim is fluent in 5 languages: English, Persian, Urdu, Hindi, and Pashto, and as of 2022 was learning Mandarin.

In December 2024, Hakim announced that she officially became a British citizen while retaining her Australian citizenship.

== Career ==
=== SBS and Dateline ===
Hakim returned to Kabul for her first Dateline report in 2008, and from then reported from across the world for Dateline and SBS World News Australia.

She was awarded the United Nations Association of Australia Media Peace Prize for best Australian Television News Coverage in 2009, and has also been a finalist for the Walkley Young Australian Journalist of the Year Award.

Beginning in 2011, Hakim co-hosted Dateline with fellow video journalist Mark Davis, the two taking it in turns to present the programme in approximately six-week blocks, while the other was away on assignment.

=== BBC News ===
In December 2012, it was announced that Hakim would join the BBC. Hakim had been in talks with BBC executives since April 2012, after being approached at a broadcasting conference in Brisbane. Subsequent meetings took place in New York, Dubai, and Afghanistan. She first appeared on BBC World News and the BBC News Channel in March 2013.

In October 2013, she interviewed Hamid Karzai, the President of Afghanistan, for Newsnight.

Since March 2014, she has made several appearances as the presenter on Impact, ultimately becoming the programme's main presenter later that year.

Her documentaries and reports can also be seen on the BBC News Channel and on BBC Two's Newsnight. She was nominated for a Peabody Award in 2021 for her writing and reporting contribution on Afghanistan: Documenting A Crucial Year.

On 8 September 2022, Hakim tweeted that Buckingham Palace had announced the death of Queen Elizabeth II 3 hours and 23 minutes before the formal announcement of her death. Hakim later withdrew the tweet, which had been made 3 minutes before the official time of the monarch's death at 15:10.

In February 2023, it was announced Hakim would become a chief presenter on the BBC's new news channel for both UK and international viewers launched in April 2023.

She presented The Daily Global for two hours every weekday, a show focused on a variety of international news. Hakim presented her final programme for BBC News on 2 October 2023.

=== Sky News ===
On 27 July 2023, Hakim tweeted that she was leaving the BBC. It was announced that she would be joining Sky News as their lead world news presenter. On 22 January 2024, Hakim began hosting the foreign affairs programme The World with Yalda Hakim, with press reports suggesting an audience of about 60,000 viewers a night.

== Yalda Hakim Foundation ==
The Yalda Hakim Foundation (YHF) was established in 2018 to support the education of exceptionally talented young women from Afghanistan, through scholarships, internships, and mentoring. In 2019 it offered a full four-year scholarship program at the American University of Afghanistan. In 2021 the Yalda Hakim Foundation partnered with Oriel College at Oxford University to provide a scholarship for a young Afghan woman, offering a fully funded one-year master's degree course.

== See also ==
- Afghans in Australia
