= Newsday (BBC News programme) =

News television series

- Created by: BBC News
- Presented by: Steve Lai
- Country of origin: United Kingdom
- Original language: English

Production
- Production location: Singapore
- Camera setup: Multi-camera
- Running time: 90 minutes

Original release
- Network: BBC News (international feed); BBC News (UK feed); BBC One
- Release: 13 June 2011 – present

Related
- ‘’Newsday (Radio)’’; The Context; BBC World News America; BBC News Now; Verified Live; The World Today; Focus on Africa; Business Today

Newsday, styled also as Newsday with Steve Lai is a news programme on BBC News that was first broadcast on 13 June 2011. The programme covers international news with a specific focus on Asia and its financial markets and is mainly presented by Steve Lai in Singapore. The programme began as a dual-presented bulletin from Singapore and London. During important news stories, the programme has previously been broadcast from Washington with either Sumi Somaskanda instead of the traditional London broadcast. Such news stories have included the death of Muhammad Ali, Hillary Clinton receiving the Democratic nomination, and Donald Trump getting important votes in his presidential nomination for the Republican Party.

The programme is broadcast around the world on BBC News (international TV channel), as well as PBS member stations in America, and is also shown in the UK on the domestic UK feed of BBC News channel. Newsday is sometimes broadcast on BBC One as part of the channel's overnight simulcast of BBC News.

== Schedule ==
Newsday is aired on weekdays. and acts as a morning programme for Asia, an overnight broadcast in Europe and the UK and an evening news programme for the Americas. It features analysis and discussion of the top news stories of the day and also previews the exclusive reports, correspondent feature films and interviews.

On 18 June 2012, Newsday broadcast times were changed to 23:00–02:00 GMT (22:00–01:00 GMT in summer time) on Sunday to Thursday. It is shown from 00:00–02:00 on Monday to Thursday in the UK. Since late 2024, the programme moved to the 02:00–05:00GMT slot again.

A look at major news events from the past are shown in "This Week in History" for UK and PBS viewers while commercial breaks are broadcast for international viewers.

During the UK's principle COVID-19 pandemic periods, Newsday was not broadcast from 27 March 2020 to 20 July 2021; during that time the slot was temporarily replaced with additional half-hour BBC World News bulletins.

== Presenters ==
The programme previously featured split presentation, with a presenter in London and a presenter in Singapore each introducing reports and interviewing occasional guests in-studio. The London presenter also presented links for UK viewers during commercial breaks, while the Singapore presenter goes on to present Business Today at the bottom of each hour. During major events in North America the programme is also presented from Washington.

On occasion the programme is broadcast from other locations, such as in November 2013 when Rico Hizon co-presented from Tacloban, Philippines following Typhoon Haiyan. In January 2014 for a while Sharma presented from Singapore and Hizon from London. Madera reported from Poland during 2015 election. During the last week of May 2017, Hizon presented from London and Sharanjit Leyl from Singapore.

For a two-month period from February to April 2018, Leyl presented Newsday from London, with Hizon or Oi in Singapore. This was due to Sharma being absent for this period of time, as she was writing a book. On Sharma's return on 3 April 2018, she announced that she will present from Singapore in a few weeks time.

During coverage of continuous international events, such as the Summer Olympics, Newsday broadcasts may be presented by only a single presenter from the Singapore studio, rather than split broadcasting with a newsreader in the London studio.

Since 2020, the programme has been largely presented from Singapore only, without any segment being presented from London or Washington. After the 2023 merger of BBC World News and UK-only BBC News Channel, the Singapore presenter also presents the UK-focused headlines on the UK feed during commercial breaks on the international feed. However, the programme is sometimes presented live on location outside the studio.

Years	Presenter	Current Role
2024–present	Steve Lai	Main Presenter
2012–present	Mariko Oi	Relief Presenter
2022–present	Arunoday Mukharji	Relief Presenter
2023–present	Suranjana Tewari	Relief Presenter
2024–present	Kate Silver	Relief Presenter
2025–present	Vandhna Bhan	Relief Presenter

== Former Singapore presenters ==
Years	Presenter	role
2011–2020	Rico Hizon	Main Singapore presenter (Monday-Wednesday, alternate Sunday/Thursday)
2011–2020	Sharanjit Leyl	Singapore presenter
2013–2015	Ali Moore	Relief Singapore presenter
2015–2023	Karishma Vaswani	Main presenter

== Former London presenters ==
Years	Presenter	role
2011–2020	Babita Sharma	Main presenter (London)
2011–2020	Kasia Madera	Main presenter (London)
2011–2020	Chris Rogers	Relief presenter (London)
2011–2015	Adnan Nawaz	Relief presenter (London)
2011–2015	Adam Parsons	Relief presenter (London)
2013–2015	Daniela Ritorto	Relief presenter (London)
2013–2015	Dani Sinha	Relief presenter (London)
2014–2020	Alice Baxter	Relief presenter (London)
2015–2020	Philippa Thomas	Relief presenter (London)
2015–2020	Lebo Diseko	Relief presenter (London)
2015–2020	Ben Boulos	Relief presenter (London)
2016–2017	Tom Donkin	Relief presenter (London)
2015–2020	Alpa Patel	Relief presenter (London)
2015–2020	Karin Giannone	Relief presenter (London)
2015–2020	Nuala McGovern	Relief presenter (London)
2018–2020	Reged Ahmed	Relief presenter (London)
2018–2020	Lukwesa Burak	Relief presenter (London)
2018–2020	Lewis Vaughan Jones	Relief presenter (London)
2018–2020	Celia Hatton	Relief presenter (London)
2019–2020	Samantha Simmonds	Relief presenter (London)
2019–2020	Maryam Moshiri	Relief presenter (London)
