= Maryam Moshiri =

British news presenter (born 1976/77)

- Moshiri c. 2025
- Born: 1976 or 1977 (age 49–50); Tehran, Iran
- Education: University College London (BA)
- Occupation: News presenter
- Years active: 2001–present
- Television: BBC News
- Spouse: Jonathan Farmer
- Children: 3

Maryam Moshiri (Persian: مریم مشیری; born 1976 or 1977) is an Iranian-British presenter working for the BBC on its News Channel broadcasting in the United Kingdom and worldwide. Her programme The World Today with Maryam Moshiri airs weekdays from 18:00 GMT (international) and 7:00 pm UK time (UK), featuring interviews with figures from the arts, culture, and entertainment.

== Early life and education ==
Moshiri was born in Tehran, Iran and moved to London with her family in 1978, shortly before the Iranian Revolution. She attended Streatham and Clapham High School and graduated from University College London in 2000 with a BA in Italian. She then completed a postgraduate diploma in Broadcast Journalism at the London College of Communication, graduating in 2001. Her sister, Nazanine Moshiri, worked as a foreign correspondent at Al Jazeera.

== Career ==
Moshiri began her career as a business reporter for Independent Radio News in July 2001 before joining the BBC in 2003. She worked for 16 years as a business news anchor on flagship programmes such as The World Today, World Business Report, Business Briefing, Work Life, and Talking Business. Moshiri also broadcast on Radio 4, BBC Breakfast, and presented the 8 pm news bulletin on BBC1, in addition to being a regular presenter on the BBC's 24‑hour news channels. In 2017, she was nominated for the Royal Television Society Award for Best News Presenter.

In 2019, Moshiri transitioned to presenting on BBC World News and BBC News, anchoring flagship programmes including Outside Source, Impact, and Global. She has also presented The Papers on BBC News. In February 2023, it was announced that she would continue as a presenter on the BBC's new news channel for both UK and international viewers launched in April. In May 2023, she was part of the BBC coverage of the Eurovision Song Contest 2023 in Liverpool, working from the New Broadcasting House studio. She has continued to present BBC News coverage of the contest every year since.

Later in 2023, Moshiri expanded her role as a relief presenter, covering programmes such as The Context, The Daily Global, BBC News Now, Verified Live, as well as BBC Weekend News and BBC News at One. During this period, she also continued presenting occasional editions of Talking Business, reporting from various locations across the UK. Following the departure of Yalda Hakim to Sky News in 2023, it was announced on the same day that Moshiri would take over as the main presenter of The Daily Global. Subsequently, her agent confirmed that The Daily Global would be relaunched as The World Today in February 2024.

On 6 December 2023, in a clip that went viral, Moshiri was seen giving the middle finger to the camera just before starting a newscast. She apologised, stating it had been a "private joke" with the staff. Additional footage later revealed that Moshiri had been counting down with her fingers with the floor manager, using her middle finger to represent the number 1.

In February 2024, Moshiri began anchoring The World Today, a new weekday programme on the BBC News channel that packages the BBC's global journalism for both UK and international audiences. In April 2024, a clip of her doing a seagull impression on the show went viral. Moshiri played herself reading the BBC News in the 2025 film Bridget Jones: Mad About the Boy. She also presented BBC News's coverage from the Vatican following the death and funeral of Pope Francis and 2025 papal conclave.

== Personal life ==
Moshiri is married to Jonathan Farmer, the editor-in-chief of LatinNews. The couple have three children and live in Wandsworth, south London.

In September 2026, Moshiri revealed that in November 2024 she had been diagnosed with polycythemia vera, a rare type of blood cancer for which there is no cure, although it can be managed as a chronic condition.
