= Tim Willcox =

British journalist for BBC News (born 1963)

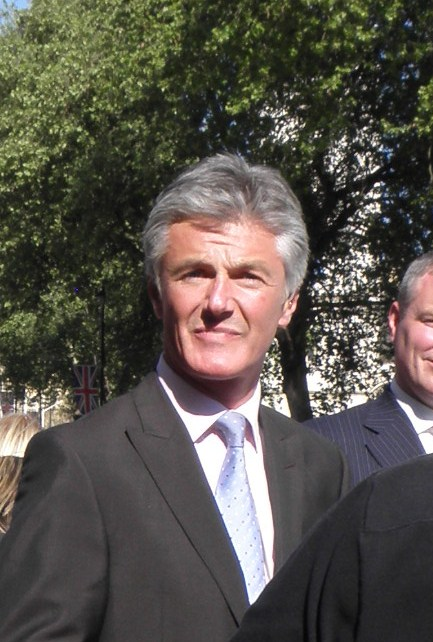
- Willcox at Westminster in 2011
- Born: Timothy Melton Willcox; 28 May 1963 (age 63); Wellington, Somerset, England
- Education: St Chad's College, Durham
- Occupations: Journalist, News presenter
- Employer: BBC
- Spouses: Sarah (m. 1995, divorced) Najah al-Otaibi (m. 2019)
- Children: 3

Timothy Melton Willcox (born 28 May 1963 in Wellington, Somerset) is a British journalist who formerly worked as a presenter for BBC News. He presents news programmes on BBC World News and the BBC News Channel. He is probably most recognisable for presenting the BBC's live coverage from Chile during events surrounding the Copiapó mining accident and anchoring the BBC's live daytime coverage during the early days of the Cairo January 2011 Egyptian revolution.

== Early life ==
Willcox was born on 28 May 1963. He grew up in Norton Fitzwarren, in south-west Somerset. He was educated at Taunton School, an independent school in Somerset, and St Chad's College, Durham University where he studied Spanish. Willcox was a member of the British Youth Orchestra, playing the trumpet. He had been awarded a Cambridge choral scholarship.

== Career ==
Willcox started in newspaper journalism, working for Mirror Group Newspapers and Fleet Street News Agency).

As a broadcast journalist, Willcox worked for ITN for many years as a presenter and correspondent. He was the network's Arts and Media Correspondent, and after joining the news team presented the network's live reports from New York City during the 11 September terrorist attacks. Willcox also presented the ITN Morning News in the 1990s, and was the first ITN journalist to break the news of the Paris car crash in 1997 that led to the death of Diana, Princess of Wales.

Since joining the BBC, Willcox has been an anchor on the BBC's news channels and used to present bulletins at weekends on BBC One. He served as regular Friday presenter on World News Today on BBC Four, BBC World News and the BBC News Channel.

In September 2010, Willcox travelled to Chile to report for BBC News on the attempts to rescue the miners trapped underground after the Copiapó mining accident. In October 2010 he did extensive live coverage of the operation to bring the trapped miners back to the surface, and interviewed Chilean President Sebastián Piñera. He is to play himself in a film about the Copiapó mining accident and began filming in February 2014.

In March 2011, Willcox played a significant role in reporting the Japanese earthquake and tsunami, reporting live for the BBC from the disaster zone and then just a few weeks later reporting from Libya on the 2011 Libyan civil war.

He presented regular programmes on BBC World News and the BBC News Channel including the Papers (the nightly paper review) as well as news bulletins. More recently he was found on the overnight slot on BBC World News and the BBC News Channel between 02:00 and 05:00 local UK time, as well as weekend afternoons (12:00 to 16:00).

On 2 February 2023, it was confirmed that Wilcox – alongside many other presenters of the domestic BBC News Channel – would lose their presenting roles as part of the BBC's relaunched news channel.

=== Other work ===
Willcox has written, produced and presented a number of documentaries for Channel 4 and Channel 5. These include:

- Paul Burrell – The Butler's Story
- Di's Guys
- The Spencers
- After Diana – Remaking the Royals
- Diana: Her Life . BBC world news America with tim willcox

In addition to his work as a journalist, Willcox has made cameo acting appearances in a number of television dramas and films. These include roles in Sex Traffic, State of Play, Jonathan Creek, 102 Dalmatians, The 33, Clueless and the BAFTA winning documentary How to Start a Revolution.

== Allegations of antisemitism ==
Willcox has twice been accused of antisemitism for his on-air comments.

On 8 November 2014, Willcox stated that the Labour Party would lose funding from Jewish sources because "a lot of these prominent Jewish faces will be very much against the mansion tax". The tax refers to a Labour proposal for an additional tax on properties worth $3.5 million or more.

At a unity rally on 11 January 2015 after 17 people were killed in terrorist attacks in Paris, many of them Jews, Willcox, while interviewing a Jewish woman who was explaining that Jews live in fear in France, interrupted her saying that "Many, many, many, many critics though, of Israel’s policy would suggest that the Palestinians suffer hugely at Jewish hands as well". This question was criticised by many including historian and BBC presenter Simon Schama, Jewish Chronicle editor Stephen Pollard and the Campaign Against Antisemitism as antisemitic for assigning collective responsibility of Israel's actions to all Jews. The woman was later identified as the daughter of Holocaust survivors. Willcox apologised the next day on Twitter, saying his question had been "poorly phrased".

== Personal life ==
Willcox was married to Sarah, and the couple had four children together. In November 2012, it was widely reported that Willcox was having an affair with BBC colleague Sophie Long.

He has lived in the village of Wootton, West Oxfordshire, also known as Wootton by Woodstock, near the River Glyme.

In September 2019, Willcox was among three BBC employees who lost a tax avoidance case involving several hundred thousand pounds of taxes the payment of which the British government claimed had been wrongfully evaded.
