= David Eades =

British journalist

David Eades is a journalist and former BBC News newsreader. He presented The World Today (05:00–08:00) among other BBC news outlets, and has a long track record in presenting on both domestic and international outlets for the BBC, including The World Tonight on Radio Four.

He has held the posts of Europe Correspondent, Ireland correspondent and senior Sports News Correspondent, as well as the specialist position of Channel Tunnel Correspondent at the time of its construction. He has also presented weekend editions of BBC Breakfast. He was a mentor and trainer for BBC journalists and presenters and also delivered presentational training beyond the broadcasting field.

Eades runs his own business, Allday Media Ltd, providing film production services for sports and conference events. Eades is also an MC and moderator, covering international conferences, in particular on areas of European affairs, Sustainability and Sport.

== Education ==
Eades was educated at the independent school Kent College in Canterbury, Kent, and at the University of Bristol, where he studied French and Politics.
