= BBC World News America =

Television series

- Genre: News program
- Created by: Garth Ancier
- Presented by: Caitríona Perry; Sumi Somaskanda
- Country of origin: United States
- Original language: English

Production
- Executive producer: Sarah Robbins
- Production locations: BBC Studios; Washington, D.C.
- Camera setup: Multiple
- Running time: 30–120 minutes
- Production company: BBC News

Original release
- Network: BBC News (UK feed); BBC News (international feed); PBS
- Release: October 1, 2007 – present

BBC World News America is an American current affairs news program created by Garth Ancier and produced by BBC News, which premiered on October 1, 2007. Produced out of the BBC's Washington, D.C. bureau, Caitríona Perry and Sumi Somaskanda are the main presenters. Katty Kay – who originally appeared on the program through her role as a Washington-based correspondent for BBC News – served as the main presenter from 2011 to 2021, replacing original co-anchor Matt Frei.

The program is broadcast worldwide on International feed of BBC News channel and, through an agreement with Washington's PBS member station, WETA-TV, is syndicated to PBS member stations and select non-commercial educational independent stations throughout the United States. Until June 2019, Los Angeles–based NCE station KCET handled this distribution.

From its debut until March 25, 2011, the program was one-hour long, airing as a simulcast on BBC America in the United States and BBC News internationally, with the first half-hour (on tape delay) being shown overnights on the BBC News in the United Kingdom. The program was reduced to a half-hour broadcast on March 28, 2011, and was removed from BBC America. On October 31, 2016, the program returned to the BBC News Channel after a five-year absence, and currently airs on the channel at 21:30 GMT for one week in November and one or two weeks in March between when the clocks change in the UK and the US.

From June 11 to July 26, 2018, Monday to Thursday, when BST was in effect, the first half-hour edition was temporarily broadcast for viewers around the world except in North and South America. Then from August 2018, the usual full-hour edition resumed global distribution.

After the domestic BBC News channel and BBC World News merged on 3 April 2023, BBC World News America continues to be broadcast at 22:00 UK time only on the international feed, while the domestic UK feed simulcasts the BBC News at Ten and Newsnight. However, it has since continued to broadcast on the UK feed on 23:00 UK time after a schedule change which saw the programme move to 22:00-00:00BST.

Since 2025, it has been broadcast in two blocks one airing from 22:00–22:30 and the second 23:00–00:00, Monday–Thursday 23:00–23:30 on a Friday, with an edition of Newsnight between 22:30 – 23:00. On Friday a recorded version of The President's Path, presented by Caitríona Perry and Sumi Somaskanda, reviewing the US political news airs between 23:30–00:00.

== Special broadcasts ==
In some instances, the program had been cut off on its hour broadcast to a few snippets for breaking news events (e.g.: 2007 Karachi bombing). In the case of the 2008 US Election primaries and caucus, the program was extended to three hours (e.g. 2008 Iowa Caucus) and even up to six hours (e.g. 2008 Super Tuesday) and was only presented by one host. BBC World News America also covered the three presidential and the only vice-presidential debates.

== Presenters ==
Years	Presenter	Current Role
2023–present	Caitriona Perry	Main Presenters
2023–present	Sumi Somaskanda	Main Presenters
2018–present	Nada Tawfik	Relief Presenter
2019–present	Michelle Fleury	Relief Presenter
2023–present	Azadeh Moshiri	Relief Presenter
2023–present	Carl Nasman	Relief Presenter
2023–present	David Willis	Relief Presenter
2023–present	Helena Humphrey	Relief Presenter
2025–present	Clare Richardson	Relief Presenter
2011–present	Katty Kay	Special editions & US Elections

=== Former presenters ===
- Laura Trevelyan (Main presenter, 2012–2023)
- Matt Frei (Main presenter, 2007–2012)
- Philippa Thomas (Relief presenter, 2007–2009)
- Jane O'Brien (Relief presenter, 2010–2023)
- Rajini Vaidyanathan (Relief presenter)
- Larry Madowo (Relief presenter, 2020–2021)

== Awards ==
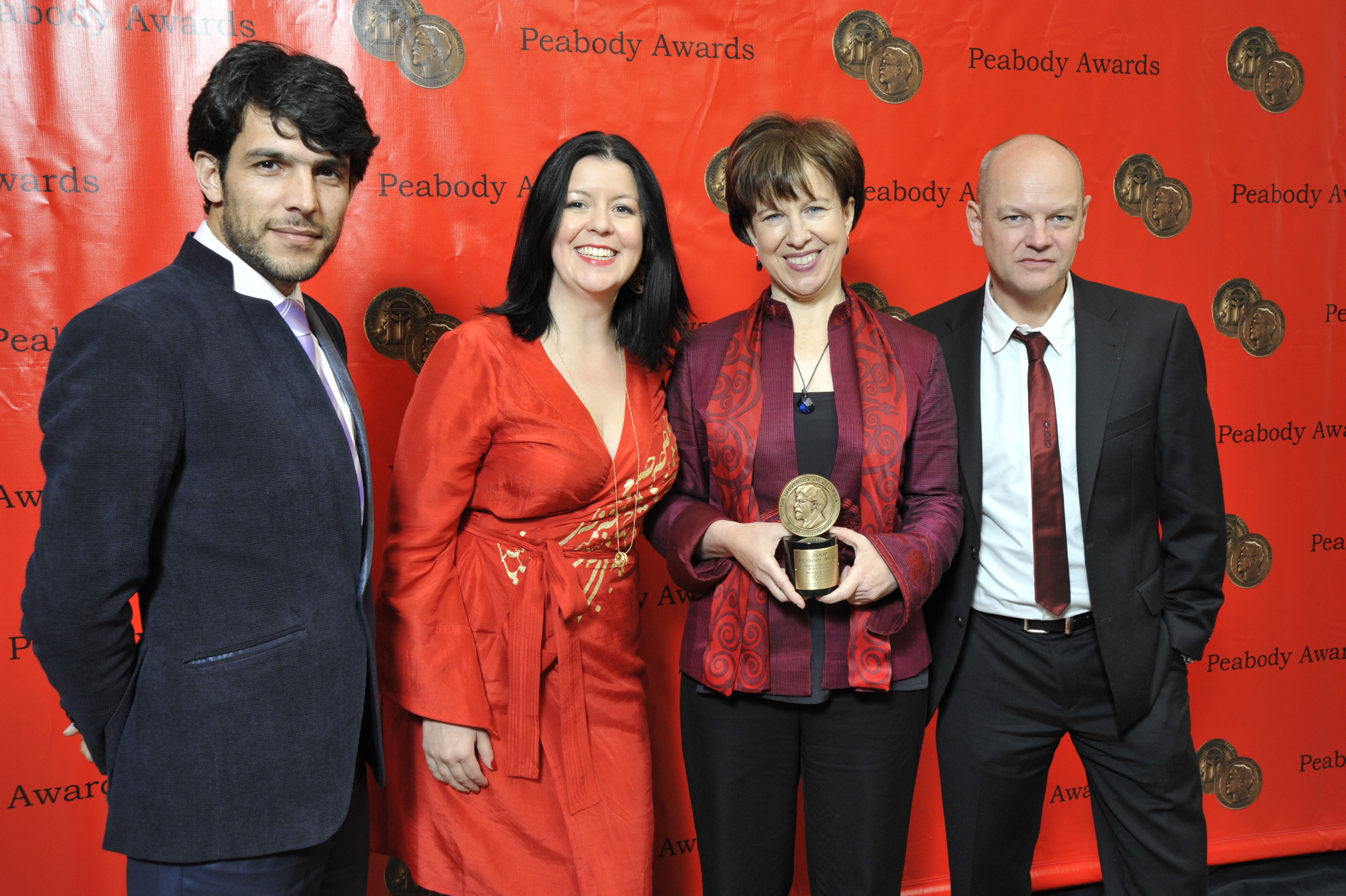
Tony Jolliffe, Melanie Marshall, Lyse Doucet and Shoaib Sharifi in 2010, at the 69th Annual Peabody Awards for Where Giving Life is a Death Sentence

BBC World News America has won several Peabody Awards. It won one in 2007 for White Horse Village. In 2010, BBC World News America was a recipient of two 69th Annual Peabody Awards. One award was given to the program, calling it a "Unique Broadcast, Unique Perspective", which was described as "A nightly newscast like none the United States has ever had, it places our actions and concerns in a global context." The second award was for the report Where Giving Life is a Death Sentence. The program won another Peabody Award in 2014 "for dedicating the necessary resources and risking their lives to give the world an up-close look at the horrors of the Syrian conflict" in Inside Syria's War.
