= List of Dr A. T. Shousha Foundation Prize and Fellowship recipients =

This is a list of recipients of the A.T. Shousha Foundation Prize and Fellowship awarded by World Health Organization (WHO).

In 1966, the 9th World Health Assembly established a foundation bearing Aly Tewfik Shousha (1891–1964) to honour the memory as one of the World Health Organization founders and first WHO Regional Director for the Eastern Mediterranean. The foundation's purpose is to award a prize known as the Shousha Prize, which is to be given to a person who made the most significant contribution to any health problem in the geographical area in which Dr Shousha served the WHO. The foundation also gives a Fellowship every 6 years that amounts to $15,000 USD.

== List of recipients of the Shousha Prize ==
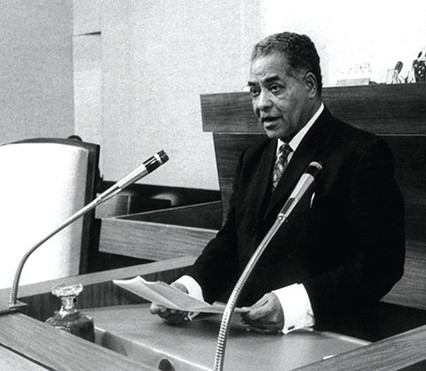
Mansour Ali Haseeb during the award ceremony in 1973

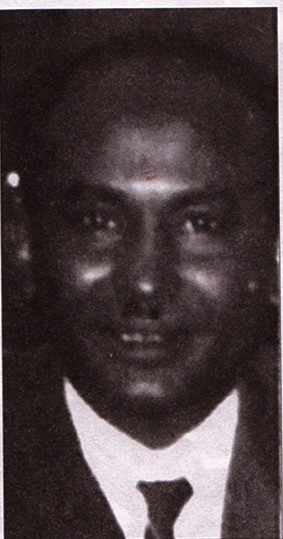
Mohamed Hamad Satti, 1985 laureate

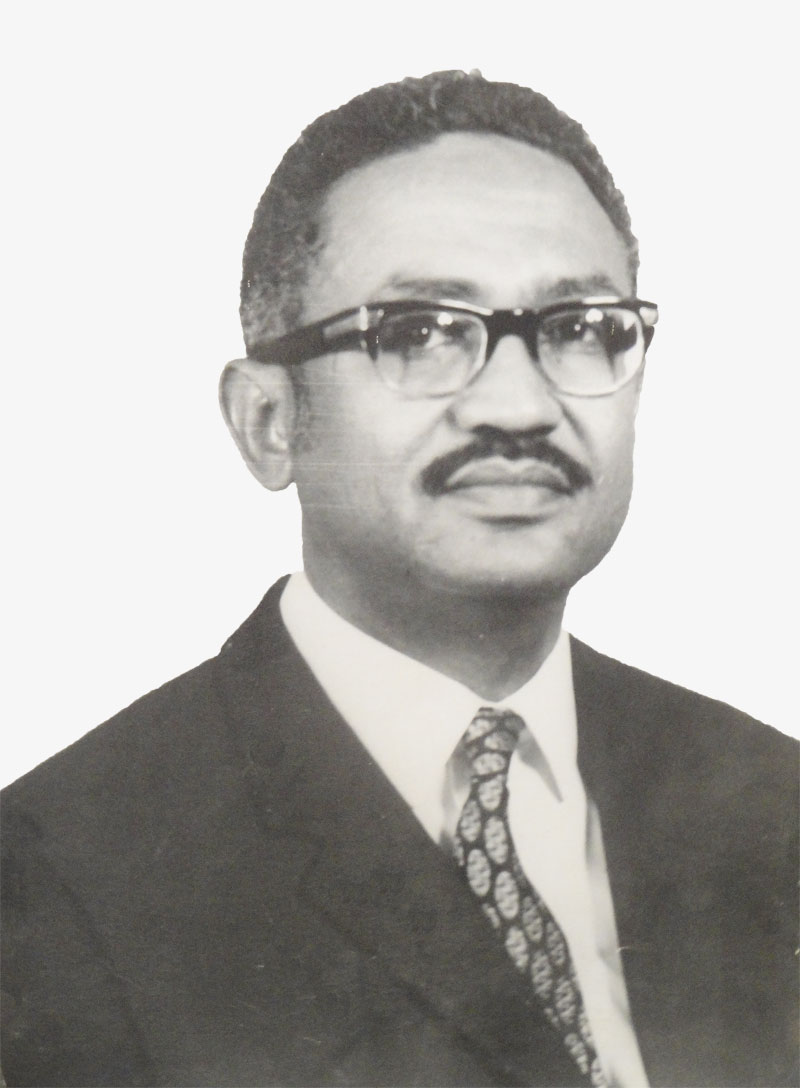
Ahmed Mohamed El Hassan, 1987 laureate

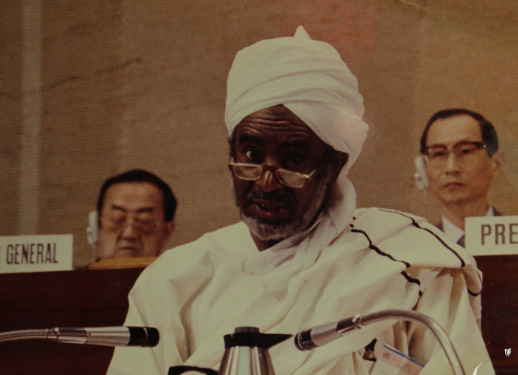
El Sheikh Mahgoub Gaafar during the award ceremony in 1989

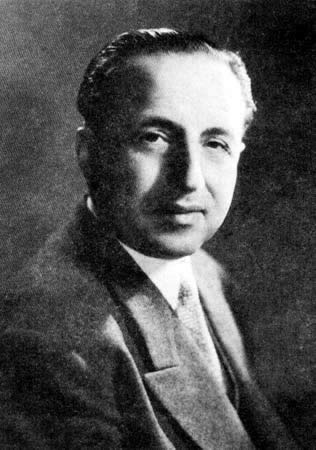
Bashir al-Azma, 1992 laureate

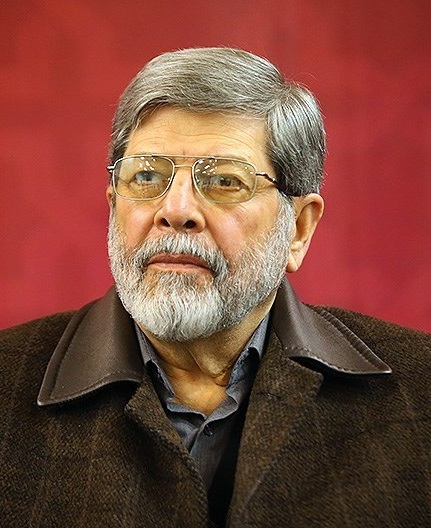
Alireza Marandi, 2000 laureate

Year	Name	Country
1968	A. M. Kamal	Egypt
1969	Monowar Khan Afridi	Pakistan
1970	Sabih Al-Wahbi	Iraq
1971	Chamseddine M. H. Mofidi	Iran
1972	A. El Halawani	Egypt
1973	Mansour Ali Haseeb	Sudan
1974	Mohamed Taieb Hachicha	Tunisia
1975	G.R. Roashan	Afghanistan
1976	N. Ramzi	Syria
1977	Ahmed Abdallah Ahmed	Egypt
1978	Ali M. Fakhro	Bahrain
1979	Riad Ibrahim Husain	Iraq
1980	C.K. Hasan	Pakistan
1981	Imam Zaghloul Imam	Egypt
1982	Hashim Saleh El Dabbagh	Saudi Arabia
1983	Suleiman Hussein Subeihi	Jordan
1984	M. I. Burney	Pakistan
1985	Mohamed Hamad Satti	Sudan
1986	Mohamed Labib Ibrahim Hasan	Egypt
1987	Ahmed Mohamed El-Hassan	Saudi Arabia
1988	Hani A. Shammout	Jordan
1989	El Sheikh Mahgoub Gaafar	Sudan
1990	Mohammed Azim Karimzad	Afghanistan
1991	Mohamed Reda Tawfik	Jordan
1992	Bashir al-Azma	Syria
1993	Hajar Ahmed Hajar	Qatar
1994	A. W. Al-Fouzan	Kuwait
1995	I. M. Yacoub	Bahrain
1996	Abdul Ghani Arafeh	Syria
1997	Mamdouh Kamal Gabr	Egypt
1998	Awad Hussein Abudejaja	Libya
1999	Benomar Ali	Morocco
2000	Seyed Alireza Marandi	Iran
2001	Wagida Anwar	Egypt
2002	Hussein Mirchamsi	Iran
2003	Yassin Abdulaleem Al-Qubati	Yemen
2004	Saleh Mohammed Al-Khusaiby	Oman
2005	Kamel Shadpour	Iran
2006	Sa’ad H. S. Kharabsheh	Jordan
2007	Nabil Kronfol	Lebanon
2008	Adeebul Hasan Rizvi	Pakistan
2009	Huda Zurayk	Lebanon
2010	Faissal Abdul Raheem Mohammed Shaheen	Saudi Arabia
2011	Amjad Daoud Niazi	Iraq
2012	Shaikha Salim Al Arrayed	Bahrain
2013	Mohammad-Reza Mohammadi	Iran
2014	Abla Mehio Sibai	Lebanon
2015	Yagob Yousef Al Mazrou	Saudi Arabia
2016	Walid Ammar	Lebanon
2017	Yasmin Ahmed Jaffer	Oman
2018	Assad Hafeez	Pakistan
2019	Radi Hammad	Egypt

== List of recipients of Shousha Fellowship ==
Year	Name	Country
1974	Kamil Abbas Al-Dorky (Note: Fellowship was not taken up)	Iraq
1976	Mohamed Ibrahim Mohamed El Laithy	Egypt
1992	Eisa Ali Johali	Saudi Arabia
1997	Nagwa El-Ashri	Egypt
2004	Masoud Mostafaie	Iran
2019	Golaleh Asghari	Iran
