= Balghis Badri =

Sudanese activist

- Born: 1948 (age 77–78); Omdurman Sudan
- Occupation: Professor of Social Anthropology
- Relatives: Babikr Bedri (grandfather); Ali Bedri (uncle)

Balghis Badri (Arabic:بلقيس بدرى, born 1948) is a Sudanese feminist activist, particularly in the fields of female genital mutilation (FGM) and the development of rural women, since 1979, and professor of social anthropology at Ahfad University for Women.

== Early life ==
She comes from a family of educators. She is the daughter of Yusuf Badri, who founded Ahfad University for Women (AUW) in Khartoum in 1966, and the granddaughter of the Mahdist soldier, Babiker Badri.

Badri earned her PhD in social anthropology from the University of Hull in England in 1978.

== Career ==
Badri was a part-time lecturer at Ahfad University for Women from 1974 to 1997, and full-time since then, where she is now professor of social anthropology. In 2002 she founded and became the inaugural director of the AUW Institute of Women, Gender and Development Studies. Badri is the Director of the Ahfad University for Women's Regional Institute of Gender, Diversity, Peace and Rights, in Omdurman/Khartoum. In 1979, she introduced women and gender-related studies to the university curriculums.

== Writing ==
In February 2017, Women's Activism in Africa (co-edited by Badri and Aili Mari Tripp) was published by Zed Books. Badri co-edited it, and wrote or co-wrote two of the ten chapters.

== Controversy ==
In January 2018 Badri's brother Gasim Badri, president of the Ahfad University for Women, was recorded on video grabbing a female student, who was protesting, by her head scarf and slapping her several times on the head. Badri defended his actions, claiming that the video "only shows one side of the truth" and that some of the demonstrators had threatened to harm and vandalize the university.
