= Mohamed Hamad Satti =

Sudanese physician (1913–2005)

- محمد حمد ساتي
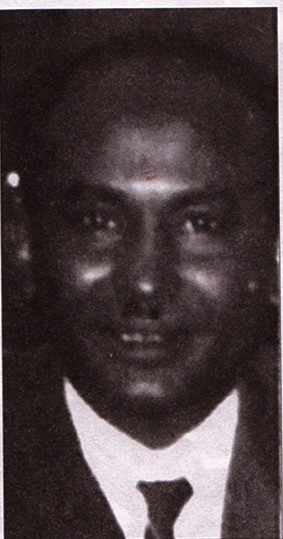
- Born: 1913; Shendi, Sudan
- Died: 15 March 2005 (aged 91–92); Khartoum, Sudan
- Resting place: Faroug Cemetery, Khartoum
- Education: Kitchener School of Medicine; Johns Hopkins
- Awards: Shousha Prize, WHO; Order of the Two Niles
- Scientific career
- Fields: Bacteriology; Zoological medicine; Epidemiology; Forensic medicine; Pathology
- Institutions: University of Khartoum; World Health Organization

Director of the Stack Medical Research Laboratories
- In office 1963–1968
- President: Ibrahim Abboud (1958–1964); Sirr Al-Khatim Al-Khalifa (acting); Sovereignty Council (1964–1965); Ismail al-Azhari
- Preceded by: Mansour Ali Haseeb
- Succeeded by: Mahmoud Abdel Rahman Ziada

Mohamed Hamad Satti (Arabic: محمد حمد ساتي, 1913 – 15 March 2005) was a Sudanese physician that is remembered as The father of Medical research in Sudan. He had a very philanthropic approach to medicine, and was known for being an entertaining educator who linked scientific information with stories from his fieldwork. Satti received the Shousha Prize from the World Health Organization, and the Order of the Two Niles. Dr Satti Foundation for medical research was created in his honour.

== Life and career ==
=== Early life and education ===
Mohamed Hamad Satti was born in Shendi, Anglo-Egyptian Sudan, in 1913. When he was 15, his father died. He attended the elementary and intermediate schools in Atbara, before joining Gordon Memorial College (Secondary school) in 1927. He graduated with a Diploma of Kitchener School of Medicine (DKSM) (today's Faculty of Medicine, University of Khartoum), in 1935.

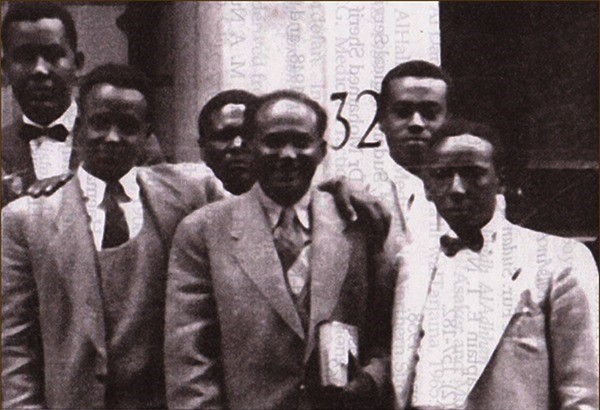
Satti in the centre in ca. 1952, UK

Satti then started his medical training working as a medical officer in areas endemic to Leishmaniasis between 1936 and 1946 including Singa and Port-Sudan. He joined Stack Medical Research Laboratories in 1946, before moving to the United Kingdom and completing a postgraduate degree in internal medicine (1952–1954) where he was also the President of the Sudanese Student Society in the UK. Once he was back in Sudan, he was appointed as a medical zoologist, where he started with a study on a visceral leishmaniasis outbreak in 1956, before going to the United States and completing a master's degree in public health at Johns Hopkins School of Hygiene and Public Health, Baltimore.

=== Career ===
Satti was elected a member of the World Health Organization Advisory Panel of parasitic diseases (1962–1980). He also became the director of Stack Medical Research Laboratories (1963–1968), succeeding Mansour Ali Haseeb who left the position to become the first Sudanese Dean of the Faculty of Medicine, University of Khartoum.

Satti occupied several posts in the Sudanese Ministry of Health. He was an educator at the Faculty of Medicine, University of Khartoum (1946–1948, 1963–1969) and a researcher of bacteriology, medical zoology, epidemiology, forensic medicine, and pathology. He laid the foundation of several laboratories and tropical medicine research centres in Sudan which include the National Health Laboratories, the Cancer Institute for Tropical Diseases Research, the Medical Research Council (1966), the School of Tropical Medicine (1966), the National Council for Research (1970), and the Institute of Medical Laboratory Technology. He was the director of the Institute of Tropical Medicine Research at the Medical Research Council, Sudan.

Satti did not have a private clinic throughout his career. He was known for being an entertaining educator who linked scientific information with stories from his fieldwork. Satti had a very philanthropic approach to medicine as he once repurposed his private car as an ambulance.

Once he retired in 1969, he became an advisor to the Sudanese Medical Research Association. He worked with WHO as a consultant epidemiologist and public health advisor to study the environmental effects of Lake Nasser in 1970. He was the Vice Chairman of the WHO Onchocerciasis Expert Committee in 1986.

=== Personal life and death ===
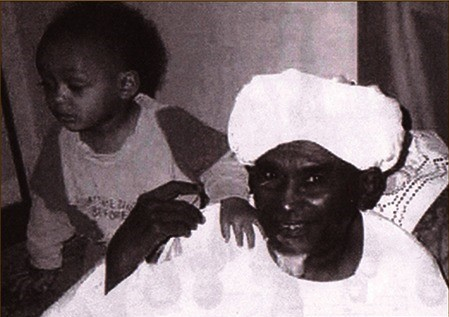
Satti with his great-grandchild, Ahmad. ca. 1994

Satti was married to Fatma Hassan el Nor and with her, they had thirteen children. He died from natural causes on 15 March 2005, and was buried in Faroug Cemetery, Khartoum.

== Research ==
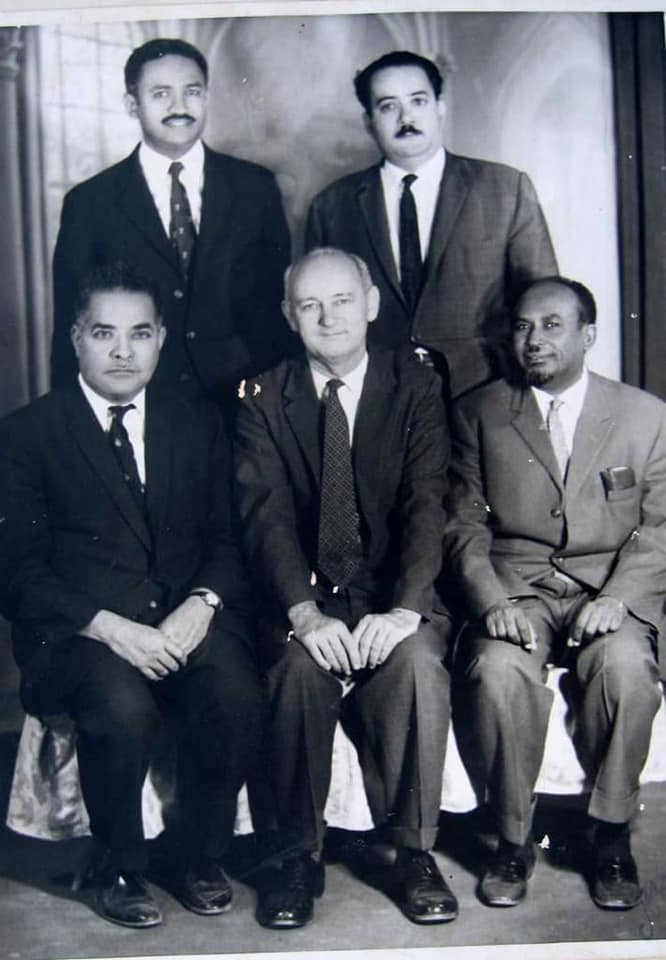
1st row from left, Mansour Haseeb, HV Morgan and Satti. 2nd row, far left, Ahmed M. El Hassan. ca. 1965

Satti carried out extensive field and laboratory work on leishmaniasis in eastern and southern Sudan, yellow fever in the Nuba Mountains and Kurmuk, Klumpke paralysis and cutaneous larva migrans in Kordofan, onchocerciasis in Bahr el Ghazal, malaria in Shendi, Hepatitis C, cholera and Leptospirosis on Nuer people, schistosomiasis in Gezira, typhoid in Western Sudan, smallpox on the Beni Halba tribe in Singa, jaundice in Al Qadarif, presbycusis in the Mabans tribe living southern Funj, filariasis in Geneina, the adverse effects of the consumption of high-nitrate-well-water in two villages in North Kordofan, and health aspects of Rahad Irrigation Project.

He presented his research at the first Italian Conference of Tropical Medicine in East Africa, Asmara, in 1952, and the International Congress of Tropical Medicine and Malaria (1958–1986). He left a legacy of scientific excellence that earned him the name The father of Medical research in Sudan.

== Awards and honours ==
Satti received an Honorary Doctor of Science in 1980 from the University of Khartoum. He received the Shousha Prize from the World Health Organization in 1985, and was awarded the Order of the Two Niles in 1989. In 2011, a foundation, Dr Satti Foundation for medical research, was established in his honour.

== See also ==
- El-Hadi Ahmed El-Sheikh
- El-Sheikh Mahgoub Gaafar
- Mohamed El-Amin Ahmed El-Tom
