= Reporters (TV programme) =

- Created by: BBC World News
- Country of origin: United Kingdom
- Original language: English

Production
- Production locations: Broadcasting House, London
- Running time: 26 minutes

Original release
- Network: BBC News (International); BBC News Channel
- Release: 1997 – present

Related
- UK Reporters

The Briefing, formerly Reporters, is a weekly analytical programme shown on BBC News, during BBC Breakfast on BBC One and BBC News International.

The programme features a presenter linking a number of BBC news reports from the past week or highlighting a topic or a series of reports and in some cases conducting interviews with correspondents present at the time the events took place. It was also shown on the BBC News Channel in the UK, but since mid-2017, this is no longer broadcast. The presenter was dropped in 2023 with text acting as the link between the reports and the programme returned to the UK feed.

Normally, the Thursday presenter of World News Today presents the show. Its sister show is UK Reporters which shows viewers internationally the best reports from across the United Kingdom.

== Former presenters ==
Years	Presenter	Current role
2011–present	Philippa Thomas	Main presenter
2010–present	Kasia Madera	Regular relief presenter
20??–present	Tim Willcox	Regular relief presenter
2013–present	Yalda Hakim	Regular relief presenter

== Former presenters ==
- Carrie Gracie – Deputy presenter 2013-2014
- Zeinab Badawi – Main presenter 20??-2014

== Special editions ==
Lyse Doucet presented a special edition in December 2013 marking three years since the start of the Arab uprisings and reports assessing the impact of the protests across the region. Another edition was presented by Komla Dumor looking back at the life of Nelson Mandela. In late December a two part episode airs looking back at the best reports from the last twelve months episode split January – June and July – December. Clive Myrie presented an edition in April 2015 looking at Europes Migration crisis.
