= National Public Health Laboratory (Sudan) =

Public health laboratory in Sudan

- المعمل القومي للصحة العامة

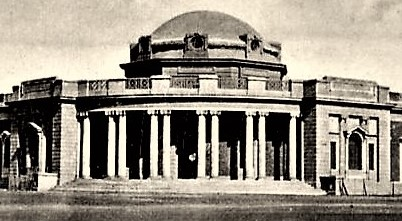
- Stack Medical Research Laboratories in 1937
- Former name: Stack Medical Research Laboratories (until April 1969)
- Nickname: Stack Laboratory (Arabic: معمل استاك)
- Established: 1927; 99 years ago
- Laboratory type: Public health laboratory
- Field of research: Medical
- Director: Shahinaz Ahmed Bedri
- Location: Khartoum, Khartoum State, Sudan; 15°35′50″N 32°31′52″E
- Affiliations: Ministry of Health; Faculty of Medicine, University of Khartoum
- Website: www.nbtc.gov.sd
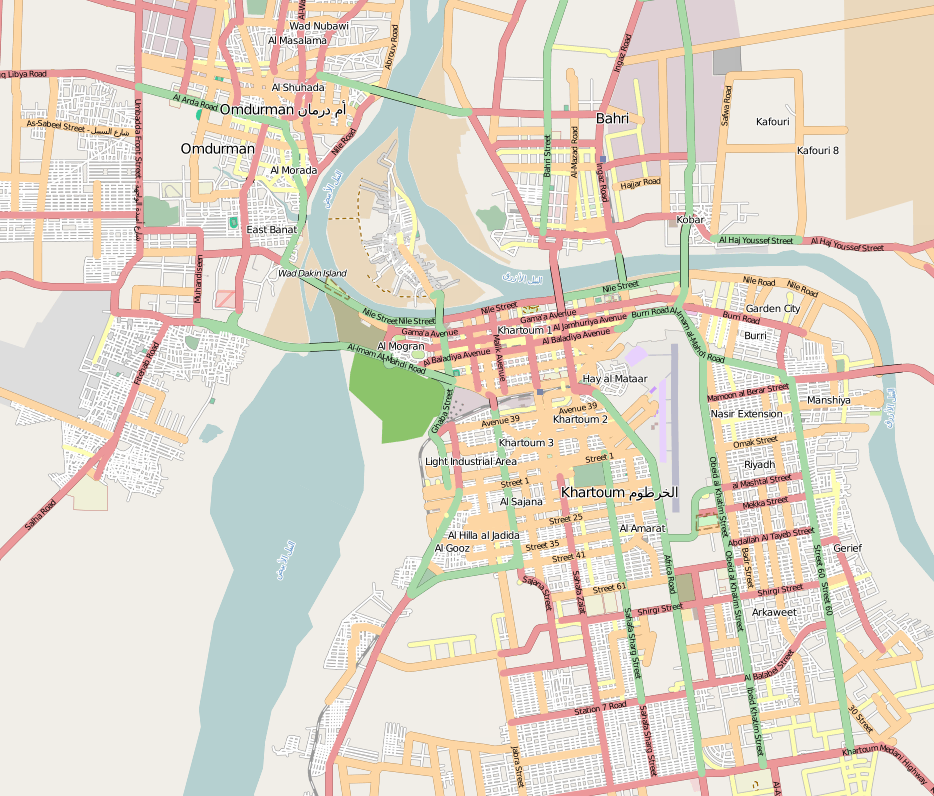
- Location within Khartoum

The National Public Health Laboratory (NPHL) (Arabic: المعمل القومي للصحة العامة) is a public health laboratory in Sudan that was previously known as the Stack Medical Research Laboratories (Arabic: معمل استاك للبحوث الطبية) from its inception in 1927 until April 1969. The name Stack Medical Research Laboratories referred to Lee Stack, a Governor-General of Anglo-Egyptian Sudan. Directors including Eric S. Horgan, Robert Kirk, and Mansour Ali Haseeb developed research programs on endemic diseases including leishmaniasis, yellow fever, and smallpox vaccine development.

In 1969, the name changed to National Public Health Laboratories, by which time it was a significant medical research hub, affiliated with the Sudan Medical Research Council. The laboratory's role expanded to conducting diagnostics, vaccine production, and research on malaria and yellow fever. The laboratory is a centre for medical education, training, and research.

== Location ==
The National Public Health Laboratory (NPHL) is located in the heart of the Khartoum, spread over a large area, bordered to the west by the Sudan Railway headquarters, to the west by the Republican Palace Street in central Khartoum, and to the north it is adjacent to the Khartoum Teaching Hospital and the Khartoum Oncology Hospital. In the 2020s, the laboratory faced severe challenges during the Sudanese revolution and the Sudanese civil war, forcing a relocation to Port Sudan due to war-induced destruction.

== History ==
The Stack Medical Research Laboratories were a branch of the Wellcome Tropical Research Laboratories (1903–1935), and were established in 1927 (Note: 1924 has been also reported) to honour Sir Lee Stack, a British Army officer and Governor-General of the Anglo-Egyptian occupation of Sudan between 1917 and until he was assassinated in 1924. Funded by a grant of 24,000 Egyptian pounds from the Sir Lee Stack Indemnity Fund Committee, the laboratories were equipped to conduct research addressing the country's public health issues.

The laboratory initially housed the bacteriological unit of the Wellcome Tropical Research Laboratories, later becoming an essential part of the Sudan Medical Service by 1 April 1935, with Eric S. Horgan serving as assistant director of Research. The laboratory was part of the Wellcome Chemical Laboratories and the Medical Entomology at Wad Medani that formed a trio in medical research.

In 1949, Horgan retired from his position and was replaced by Robert Kirk who received the Chalmers Medal of Tropical Medicine and Hygiene in 1943. The same year witnesses the creation of the Sudanese Ministry of Health. Kirk's research mainly focused on prevalent Sudanese diseases like leishmaniasis, relapsing fever, and yellow fever. He later became a full-time professor of pathology at the Faculty of Medicine in the University of Khartoum in 1952 was succeeded by Mansour Ali Haseeb who became the first Sudanese director of the laboratory.

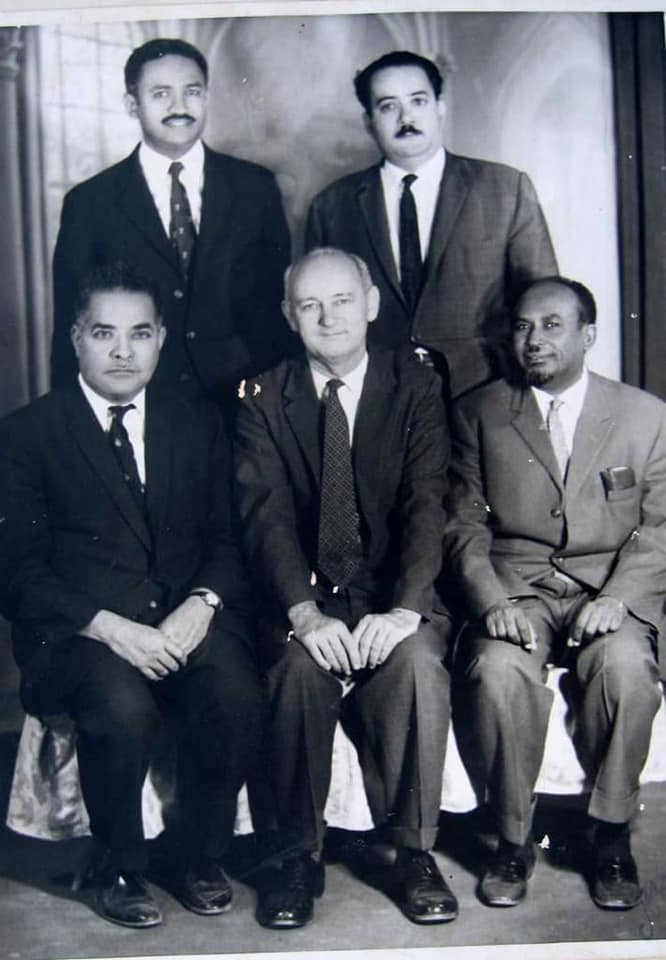
1st row from left, Mansour Haseeb, HV Morgan and Mohamed Hamad Satti. 2nd row, far left, Ahmed M. El Hassan. c. 1965

Haseeb, who is considered the "Godfather Of Sudan's Laboratory Medicine", conducted research on various endemic diseases and collaborated on successful experiments regarding smallpox vaccine production. Together with researchers from the Rockefeller Foundation, Haseeb conducted serological surveys on yellow fever in 1954. Haseeb also introduced a unified policy for training laboratory assistants across the country and the initiation of a technician training program in 1953. In 1960, the United States Naval Medical Research Unit Three initiated a comprehensive investigation on visceral leishmaniasis in the Bahr El Ghazal Province, which continued until 1964.

In 1963, Haseeb left Stack to become a professor of Microbiology and Parasitology, and the first Sudanese Dean of the Faculty of Medicine at the University of Khartoum. He was succeeded by Mohamed Hamad Satti. Satti conducted extensive studies on leishmaniasis, hepatitis A, and various other prevailing diseases. Within the laboratories, he formulated plans for training Bachelor of Science graduates in the United Kingdom in biomedical subjects such as schistosomiasis and entomology. Theses produced by these graduates, along with others, were beneficial for research initiatives supported by the Sudanese Ministry of Health.

In 1968, Satti was replaced by Mahmoud Abdel Rahman Ziada, who engaged in research and standard procedures at the laboratory until their relocation to the newly constructed facilities named The National Health Laboratory in April 1969. Ziada served as director until 1973.

Plans to expand and reorganise the Stack Medical Research Laboratories started in the 1960s with construction starting in 1964. The National Public Health Laboratories commenced operations in April 1969. Situated adjacent to the old Stack Medical Research Laboratories buildings, the new five-story structure spans approximately 9,000 square metres (97,000 sq ft). The construction of these national public health laboratories amounted to a little over two million dollars, funded by the Government.

In 2019, the NPHL announced plans to establish a national policy and standards for laboratories in Sudan, supported by the World Health Organization as the laboratory sought WHO recognition for specific diseases and plans widespread quality system training. The initiative involves various sectors and focuses on improving service conditions to retain staff.

=== Sudanese revolution ===
During the 2018–2019 Sudanese revolution and Sudan transition to democracy, protests demanding an inquiry into the 3 June 2019 Khartoum massacre continued. The police forcefully dispersed the vigil hosted by the NPHL staff in June 2023. The Sudanese Professionals Association condemned this as "violent brutality," cautioning against harming the country's capabilities.

On 17 March 2022, the Sudanese Doctor Syndicate announced that a force from the security forces stormed, on March 17, the Central Blood Bank at the NPHL, smashed the windows of its doors, terrorised its workers, and stole their phones at gun point.

The next day Member of the Transitional Sovereignty Council and Chairman of the Supreme Committee for Health Emergencies, Abdel-Baqi Abdel-Qader Al-Zubair, accompanied by the Acting Governor of Khartoum, Ahmed Othman Hamza, made a visit to the NPHL and asked for the facilities to be protected and secured. He stopped short from condemning the attach and called the attackers as a small faction that does not be represent all regular forces. Abdel Baqi revealed that investigations will clarify those responsible for this action, so that they will be held accountable as a matter of urgency.

The following day, the Resistance Committees at the NPHL joined the Sudanese Resistance Committees' strike. They demand the withdrawal of armed personnel from health facilities, refused services to armed forces, and sought protection laws for medical facilities.

=== Sudanese civil war (2023–present) ===
On 25 April 2023, during the Sudanese civil war, armed forces took control of the NPHL, and expelled its staff responsible for managing biological hazards. The laboratory contained isolates of poliovirus, measles virus, and Vibrio cholerae; causative agents of the virulent diseases polio, measles, and cholera, respectively. The WHO representative in Sudan expressed concerns about significant biological risks linked to this situation. Furthermore, the WHO highlighted the risk of power outages compromising the containment of biological materials and the storage of blood products.

On 27 August 2023, the WHO delivered essential equipment and resources to the Ministry of Health. This support was aimed at enhancing the capacities of the Public Health Laboratory in Port Sudan, Red Sea State, intending to elevate it to the status of the National Public Health Laboratory. The shift was necessary because the NPHL in Khartoum had been non-operational since April 2023 due to the conflict. The laboratory's vital functions are crucial, especially during the rainy season, when the increased risk of floods and disease outbreaks demands enhanced public health emergency preparedness and response capabilities.

Since 8 September 2023, the NPHL moved from Khartoum to Port Sudan, east of the country, as a result of it being subjected to sabotage and destruction due to the war that has been going on there since last April 15. It has begun analysing and culturing epidemiological samples transferred from other states of the country.

== Function ==
The NPHL accommodates various departments, including Central Blood Bank, bacteriology, pathology, chemical pathology, the Government Analyst laboratories, and the medical entomology sections of the Ministry of Health. Each department within the NPHL contributes, to varying degrees, to research addressing medical issues associated with endemic diseases in Sudan. Additionally, it houses the Department of Medical Microbiology and Parasitology along with the Department of Pathology from the Faculty of Medicine at the University of Khartoum. The Sudan Medical Research Council, an independent research body established in 1970 following a Presidential Decree, also operates within the laboratory.

Activities at the NPHL encompassed teaching medical students and auxiliary staff, conducting routine diagnostic work and vaccine preparation, and researching endemic and epidemic diseases, such as coronavirus. Research primarily aimed to address specific problems related to endemic diseases or assist in epidemic control measures. Surveys and investigations were conducted on diseases like malaria, yellow fever, visceral leishmaniasis, cerebrospinal meningitis, smallpox, and typhoid fever. Routine activities included diagnostic examinations of patient specimens from hospitals and vaccine preparation for diseases such as smallpox, rabies, cholera, and tuberculosis. Additionally, educational initiatives included teaching various medical subjects to students at the Faculty of Medicine, University of Khartoum, forensic medicine to police cadets, training laboratory assistants and technicians, and providing laboratory instruction at the Khartoum Nursing College.

== Directors ==
- 1935 – 1949 Eric S. Horgan
- 1949 – 1952 Robert Kirk
- 1952 – 1963 Mansour Ali Haseeb
- 1963 – 1968 Mohamed Hamad Satti
- 1968 – 1973 Mahmoud Abdel Rahman Ziada
- 2014 – 2019 Abdullah Abdul Karim
- 2020 Abu Baker Ibrahim (acting)
- 2021 Fathia Adam Muhammad Saleh
- 2022 – Shahinaz Bedri
