= Dafallah =

Dafallah or Daf'allah (Arabic: دفع الل) is a masculine given name and surname of Arabic origin. Notable people with the name include:

== Given name ==
- Dafallah al-Haj Ali, former prime minister of Sudan in 2025

== Surname ==
- Al-Jazuli Daf'allah (born 1935), former prime minister of Sudan from 1985 to 1986
- Nazir Dafallah (1922–1982), Sudanese politician and veterinary
