= Malik Badri =

Sudanese author (1932–2021)

- مالك بابكر بدري محمد

Personal details
- Born: 1932 Rufaa, Sudan
- Died: 8 February 2021 (aged 88)
- Education: American University of Beirut; University of Leicester; University College London
- Occupation: Researcher

Malik Babikr Badri Mohammed (Arabic: مالك بابكر بدري محمد) (16 February 1932 – 8 February 2021) was a Sudanese author and professor of psychology. He was the founder of the modern Islamic Psychology and published such influential books as The Dilemma of Muslim Psychologists and many others. He was sometimes affectionately called Baba Malik. He died on February 8, 2021, in Kuala Lumpur, Malaysia. He was the son of Babikr Bedri who had established the Ahfad University. He was married with 7 children.

== Life ==
He was born in 1932 in Rufaa, Sudan. He received his college degree on General Science in 1956 with distinction from the American University of Beirut and got his master's degree from the same university in 1958 on Psychology and Education. He got his doctorate, studying "Concept formation from diagrams" from the University of Leicester in 1961. In 1966, he received his postdoc degree from the Department of Psychiatry of the Middlesex Hospital Medical School at University College London. He was elected Fellow of the British Psychological Society in 1977 and was awarded the title of Chartered Psychologist from there. For his contributions, he was awarded the medal of Shahid Zubair by the President of Sudan in April 2003, the highest for academic excellence.

He was appointed dean and professor at several universities, e.g. Dean of the Faculty of Education at the University of Juba, the University of Khartoum and the Dean of Islamic Thought and Civilization at the International Islamic University. He was the founder of several departments of education and psychology, e.g. the Applied Psychology Department at the University of Khartoum and one founded in Imam Muhammad ibn Saud Islamic University. He founded the Psychological Clinic of the University of Riyadh in 1971. He served in several hospitals in Africa and Asia as a clinical psychologist. He has written prolifically on psychology. His books have been translated into languages of the Islamic and Arab world and Russian.

In 2020, he was chosen by Sudanese Ministry of Information as the Person of the Year for his research on psychology.

He was chosen to be an expert in Bahir Dar by UNESCO. He was appointed a few times briefly by the World Health Organization as a member of a committee on traditional medicinal practice. He was Distinguished Professor of Clinical Psychology in the Department of Psychology at the Ahfad University. He was awarded an honorary Doctor of Science from the same university. He had also been appointed to the Chair of Ibn Khaldun in the Faculty of Islamic Revealed Knowledge and Human Sciences at the International Islamic University Malaysia.

He founded The International Association of Islamic Psychology (IAIP) in 2017 to "expand Islam's role in advancing health and human understanding and increasing recognition of Islamic psychology as a theoretical orientation to understanding the human being and approaches to clinical psychology". He started working at Istanbul Sabahattin Zaim University in 2017 as a professor of psychology.

He met Malcolm X in Sudan when he was 27 studying in 1959. He showed him around in Omdurman, Sudan. He has said he felt Malcolm X took his name Malik after him although he did not ask him explicitly.

He was Professor of Psychology at Istanbul Sabahattin Zaim University, as well as visiting lecturer at the International Open University, before he died on 8 February 2021, aged 88, while on treatment in Malaysia, eight days before his 89th birthday.

== Research areas ==
Clinical, Islamic, Social Psychology; Cognitive Behaviour Therapy; Islamic Studies

== Works ==
Books

- Badri, Malik (15 September 2018). Contemplation:: An Islamic Psychospiritual Study (New ed.). International Institute of Islamic Thought (IIIT). ISBN 978-1-64205-232-9.
- Badri, Malik (1 January 2013). Abu Zayd al-Balkhi's Sustenance of the Soul: The Cognitive Behavior Therapy of a Ninth Century Physician. International Institute of Islamic Thought (IIIT). ISBN 978-1-56564-599-8.
- Badri, Malik (15 March 2018). Culture and Islamic Adaptation Psychology. Humanology Sdn Bhd. ISBN 978-967-15409-2-3.
- Badrī, Mālik (2015). Cyber-counseling for Muslim Clients: A Muslim Psychologist Addressing Psychospiritual Problems Faced by Muslims. Other Press. ISBN 978-967-0957-02-9.
- Esack, Farid; Chiddy, Sarah (19 January 2009). Islam and AIDS: Between Scorn, Pity and Justice. Oneworld Publications. ISBN 978-1-85168-633-9.
- Islamizing and Indigenizing Psychology
- Badri, Malik (1999). The AIDS crisis: a natural product of modernity's sexual revolution. Human Behaviour Academy. ISBN 978-0-9574762-1-9.
- Badrī, Mālik (1998). The AIDS Dilemma: A Progeny of Modernity. Islamic Medical Association of South Africa.
- Badri, Malik (1999). The AIDS crisis: a natural product of modernity's sexual revolution. Human Behaviour Academy. ISBN 978-0-9574762-1-9.
