= Ahmed Mohamed El Hassan =

Sudanese medical scientist (1930–2022)

Ahmed Mohamed El Hassan FRCP FTWAS FRCPath
- أحمد محمد الحسن

Minister of Higher Education and Scientific Research
- In office 1971–1972
- President: Gaafar Nimeiry
- Vice President: Abel Alier
- Preceded by: Position established

Personal details
- Born: 10 April 1930 Berber, Sudan
- Died: 10 November 2022 (aged 92) Al Riyad, Khartoum, Sudan
- Citizenship: Sudanese; Saudi
- Scientific career
- Education: University of Khartoum (Diploma); University of London (DCP); University of Edinburgh (PhD)
- Fields: Pathology; Immunology; Tropical disease; Epidemiology; Nasopharyngeal carcinoma
- Workplaces: University of Khartoum; King Faisal University; Ahfad University for Women

Ahmed Mohamed El Hassan (Arabic: أحمد محمد الحسن; 10 April 1930 – 10 November 2022) was a Sudanese professor of pathology.

El Hassan was born and reared in Sudan. He received most of his medical training at the University of Khartoum before completing a PhD at the University of Edinburgh in 1965. Upon his return to Sudan, he led the Department of Pathology (1966–1969) and the Faculty of Medicine (1969–1971) before briefly heading the Ministry of Higher Education and Scientific Research (1971–1972). He became the president of the Medical Research Council (1972–1977), while helping establish the Department of Pathology at King Faisal University, Saudi Arabia and the Institute of Medical Laboratory Technology, Sudan. In addition, El Hassan was the Founding Director of the Institute of Endemic Diseases (1993–2000), the Sudanese National Academy of Sciences (SNAS) (2005–2011) and the Sudanese Cancer Society (2008–2009).

El Hassan focused on epidemiology and the immunopathology of tropical and infectious diseases. As a result, Sudan bestowed upon him the highest orders of merit, and the Sudanese state of Al Qadarif's tropical medicine centre was named after him. In addition, he received WHO's 1987 Shousha Prize, RSTMH's 1996 Donald Mackay Medal, and the 2017–2018 Sheikh Hamdan bin Mohammed Al Maktoum award.

== Life and career ==
=== Early life and education ===
El Hassan was born in Berber, Sudan, on 10 April 1930. Like many at that time, he started his education at a Quranic school (Khalwa) before joining Berber Intermediate School. He later moved to Khartoum to join Omdurman Secondary School in 1945.

El Hassan attended the Kitchener School of Medicine (now Faculty of Medicine, University of Khartoum). He graduated with a distinction in Medicine and Surgery in 1955 while winning the Kitchener Memorial prize for best graduate. He joined the Sudanese Ministry of Health to train, starting as a houseman between 1955 and 1957, and a medical officer from 1957 to 1958 in different locations in Khartoum, Omdurman and Northern State. He then returned to the Pathology Department, University of Khartoum as a research assistant.

El Hassan continued his training at the University of London and obtained a Diploma in Clinical Pathology (DCP) in 1961. He returned to the University of Khartoum for a short period (1962–1963) as a lecturer before starting a doctor of philosophy in Immunology at the University of Edinburgh, which he completed in 1965.

=== Career ===
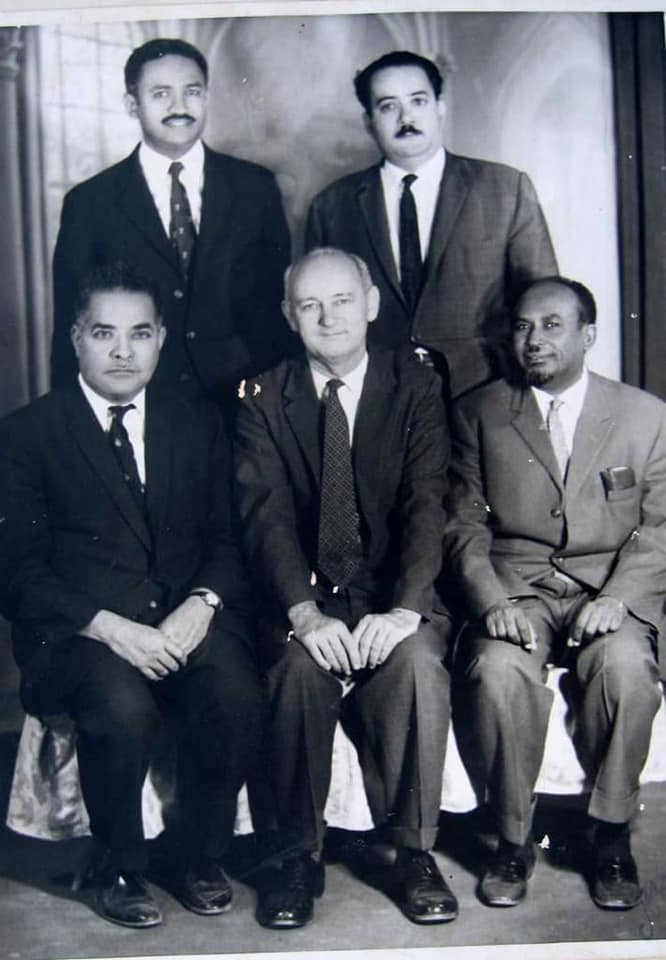
First row from left, Mansour Haseeb, HV Morgan and Mohamed Hamad Satti. Second row, far left, El Hassan. ca. 1965

El Hassan returned to the Department of Pathology, University of Khartoum as a senior lecturer before becoming a professor and department head in 1966. In 1969, El Hassan was made the Faculty of Medicine's dean and the university's deputy vice-chancellor.

El Hassan was the founding minister of higher education and scientific research, Sudan, between 1971 and 1972, after which he became the president of the Medical Research Council (1972–1977). El Hassan then joined King Faisal University, Saudi Arabia, as a professor in 1977 and helped establish the Department of Pathology before leaving in 1979, to return in 1981 as the director of research until 1987.

Between 1979 and 1980, El Hassan was in Sudan as the director of the Tropical Diseases Institute, and he established the Institute of Medical Laboratory Technology. Upon his return from Saudi Arabia in 1988, he continued working at the department of Pathology, Faculty of Medicine, University of Khartoum.

El Hassan was the founding director of the Institute of Endemic Diseases between 1993 and 2000, and continued his affiliation with the institute as an Emeritus Professor of Pathology until his death in 2022. El Hassan was the Founding President of the Sudanese National Academy of Sciences (SNAS) in 2005, and was the president of the Sudanese Cancer Society between 2008 and 2009.

El Hassan was a visiting professor at the University of London, University of Copenhagen, Ahfad University for Women, and October 6 University. He was a member of the Research Advisory Committee of the World Health Organization (WHO), and a member of the Scientific and Technical Advisory Committee of Tropical Disease Research, WHO.

=== Personal life and death ===
El Hassan married Amal Galal Mohamed in 1959 and had four daughters. He had a keen interest in photography and music. He established the first medical photography and illustration unit in Sudan. He learned to play the oud and published his book Writings on Medicine, Music and Literature in 2017.

El Hassan died on 10 November 2022 in his house in Al Riyadh, Khartoum from natural causes.

== Research ==
El Hassan focused on epidemiology and immunopathology of tropical and infectious diseases, especially leishmaniasis and mycetoma, including diagnosis, therapy, and vaccines. His research also investigated leprosy and malaria, and after 2005, he shifted his focus to nasopharyngeal cancer. He received research grants from the World Health Organization's Tropical Disease Research, the Wellcome Trust, Danish International Development Agency, and The World Academy of Sciences.

== Awards and honours ==
The Government of Sudan awarded El Hassan the Gold Medal for Research and Science in 1977, Order of the Two Niles (First Class) in 1979, and the Order of Merit (First Class) in 1995. He received an Honorary Doctor of Science from the Ahfad University for Women in 2006. Professor Ahmed Mohamed El-Hassan Center for Tropical Medicine in Doka, Al Qadarif State, and EL Hassan Centre for Neglected Tropical Diseases Clinical Trials Research in Soba, Khartoum were named after him in 2010 and 2016, respectively.

He was elected a Fellow of the Royal College of Pathologists, London (FRCPath) in 1964, a Fellow of the Royal College of Physicians, London (FRCP) in 1974, and a Fellow of The World Academy of Sciences (FTWAS) in 1996. He received the Shousha Prize from the World Health Organization in 1987, Donald Mackay Medal from the Royal Society of Tropical Medicine and Hygiene in 1996, and Sheikh Hamdan bin Mohammed Al Maktoum Award for medical sciences in 2017–2018.

== Selected publications ==
- Zijlstra, E. E.; Musa, A. M.; Khalil, E. a. G.; Hassan, IM El; El-Hassan, A. M. (2003–02). Postkala-azar dermal leishmaniasis. The Lancet Infectious Diseases. 3 (2): 87–98. doi:10.1016/S1473-3099(03)00517-6. ISSN 1473-3099. PMID 12560194.
- Ghalib, H. W.; Piuvezam, M. R.; Skeiky, Y. A.; Siddig, M.; Hashim, F. A.; El-Hassan, A. M.; Russo, D. M.; Reed, S. G. (1993–07). Interleukin 10 production correlates with pathology in human Leishmania donovani infections. The Journal of Clinical Investigation. 92 (1): 324–329. doi:10.1172/JCI116570. ISSN 0021-9738. PMID 8326000.
- Zijlstra, E E; El-Hassan, A. M. (2001–04). Leishmaniasis in Sudan. 3. Visceral leishmaniasis. Transactions of The Royal Society of Tropical Medicine and Hygiene. S27–S58. doi:10.1016/S0035-9203(01)90218-4.
- Zijlstra, E E; El-Hassan, A. M.; Ismael, A; Ghalib, H W (1994–12). Endemic kala-azar in eastern Sudan: a longitudinal study on the incidence of clinical and subclinical infection and post-kala-azar dermal leishmaniasis. The American journal of tropical medicine and hygiene. 51 (6): 826–836. doi:10.4269/ajtmh.1994.51.826. ISSN 1476-1645. PMID 7810819.
