= Gaafar Ibnauf Children's Emergency Hospital =

Gaafar Ibnauf Children’s Emergency Hospital
- The location of Gaafar Ibnauf Pediatric Hospital in Khartoum, Sudan

Geography
- Location: Khartoum, Sudan
- Coordinates: 15.5996273°N 32.5349382°E

Organisation
- Type: National
- Affiliated university: University of Khartoum

Services
- Emergency department: No
- Beds: 186

Helipads
- Helipad: No

History
- Founded: 2002

Links
- Lists: Hospitals in Sudan

Gaafar Ibnauf Children’s Emergency Hospital, Gaafar Ibnauf Children's Emergency Hospital (GICH) or the Dr. Gaafar Ibnauf Specialized Hospital is a children's hospital located in Khartoum, Sudan. It is the largest children's hospital in Sudan and incorporates many of the paediatric subspecialties including respiratory medicine, neurology, gastroenterology, cardiology, nephrology, infectious disease, paediatric intensive care and neonatal intensive care. It was one of the first dedicated children's hospitals in Africa.

== History ==
The inauguration of the project of the Gaafar Ibnauf Hospital took place in 1977 under the supervision of Professor Gaafar Ibnauf Suliman and the Sudanese Ministry of Health, with assistance from UNICEF. The hospital was originally opened as the Children's Emergency Hospital (CEH) which later evolved into 16 wards, a pharmacy, radiology department, nutritional rehabilitation and vaccination units, administration, records and statistics units. It was renamed the Dr. Gaafar Ibnauf Specialized Hospital in 2002 in an official ceremony attended by head of state Omar al-Bashir. While the hospital once had an emergency department it now operates as a tertiary hospital and, like other tertiary or specialist centres, only takes on patients via referral from outside.

== Research and global health ==
The hospital has produced research in many areas such as malaria, hepatology and antibiotic use. Gaafar Ibnauf, and the CEH before it, have been involved in managing outbreaks of infectious diseases including diphtheria, whooping cough, and notably through an early example of molecular epidemiology by which researchers tracked the progress of a strain of neisseria meningitidis during a pandemic of mengingococcal sepsis across parts of Asia and Africa in the late 1980s. The Gaafar Ibnauf is an essential focus of medical training in the region. From its instigation in 1977 to the present day it has had ongoing involvement with the University of Khartoum.
