= Kasia Madera =

British journalist

- Born: Katarzyna Madera; Paddington, London, England
- Education: Queen Mary University of London
- Occupations: Journalist, television presenter
- Employer: BBC
- Notable credit(s): BBC One; BBC Two; BBC Three; BBC Four; BBC News; BBC World News; Newsday; World News Today with Kasia Madera; GMT; Impact; Global; Outside Source; The Papers
- Spouse: Simon Russell
- Children: 2
- Website: kasiamadera.com

Katarzyna "Kasia" Madera is a British journalist and television news presenter. She is a chief presenter for BBC News and BBC News Polska, fronting mainly morning bulletins on BBC Two, the BBC News channel, as well as BBC News at One on alternate weekends, and formerly presented Newsday and World News Today.

Madera is a chief presenter on the BBC News channel and alternative weekend afternoons, and the BBC News at One, as well as for BBC News Polska.

== Education ==
Madera graduated from Queen Mary & Westfield, University of London, with a degree in French and politics.

== Career ==
After joining the BBC graduate programme in 2002, she initially presented BBC Three's youth-oriented news bulletin 60 Seconds. She then presented the round-up of the day's entertainment and celebrity news in E24.

Formally joining the BBC News channel as a news presenter, she presented as a regular stand-in, alongside her roles on Newsday and World News Today. She worked for BBC News and BBC World News as the news anchor of the evening and overnight bulletins. Madera presented the most-watched BBC One, the BBC News channel and BBC World News simulcast following the opening ceremony of London 2012 Olympics when the Channel achieved its highest ever viewing figures. Also the overnight coverage of The Death of Nelson Mandela.

Madera speaks Polish, and as a result reported for the BBC News channel on the 2007 Polish parliamentary election and again in 2015, 2014 European Elections, and the 2010 Polish Air Force Tu-154 crash in Russia, which killed 96 people including Polish President Lech Kaczyński. She also took over from Huw Edwards after the death of Nelson Mandela presenting overnight coverage on BBC One, BBC World News, the BBC News channel and PBS.

On 2 February 2023, it was confirmed that Madera – along with many other presenters of the domestic BBC News channel – would lose their presenting roles as part of the BBC's relaunched news channel. In May 2024 Madera and three other presenters started legal action against the BBC on the grounds of sex and age discrimination and equal pay.

In 2024, she played a fictional version of herself as a state news presenter in HBO series The Regime. On 12 May 2024, Madera presented her first bulletins in over a year on the BBC News channel. She also returned to present the successor to World News Today, 'The World Today with Maryam Moshiri' while Moshiri was temporarily reassigned during the 2024 UK general election. In 2025, she was appointed alternating main presenter of the lunchtime BBC Weekend News. In 2025, Madera was announced as a main presenter for the relaunched BBC News Polska.

== Personal life ==
Madera is married to Simon Russell; the couple have two sons and live in Shepherd's Bush, West London.

== See also ==
- List of current BBC newsreaders and reporters
- List of people from the City of Westminster
- List of people associated with the University of London

Media offices
Preceded by New Position	Deputy London presenter of Newsday; 2011–present	Incumbent
Preceded by Philippa Thomas	Deputy Presenter of World News Today; With Karin Giannone, Philippa Thomas and Alpa Patel; 2014–present	Incumbent
