= Robert Kirk (pathologist) =

Scottish parasitologist and pathologist

Professor Robert Kirk OBE FRSE FRCP

Personal details
- Born: 26 January 1905 Glasgow, Scotland
- Died: 6 December 1962 (aged 57) Hong Kong
- Occupation: Parasitologist, pathologist

Robert Kirk (1905-1962) was a Scottish parasitologist and pathologist.

== Life ==
He was born on 26 January 1905 in Glasgow the son of the Rev Robert Lee Kirk, a Church of Scotland minister, and his wife Primrose Adair Martin, daughter of John Martin, a brewer. He was educated at Greenock Academy then studied Zoology and Medicine at Glasgow University, winning the Gairdner Medal in medicine in 1930. He graduated MB ChB in Medicine and BSc in Zoology. His zoological studies were under Prof John Graham Kerr.

He served in several Glasgow hospitals and notably as Assistant Bacteriologist in the Glasgow Public Health Laboratories. After obtaining a further Diploma in Public Health (DPH) in 1933, he went to Africa to work in the Sudan Medical Service where he worked for twenty-two years, in both the Stack and Wellcome Research Laboratories rising to be Director of the former. Here he specialised in the study of kala-azar and yellow fever. He also undertook the taxonomy of sand-flies. The Royal Society of Tropical Medicine and Hygiene awarded him the Chalmers Medal for his work. He was awarded his doctorate (MD) in 1939 and won the Bellahouston Gold Medal.

In 1943, he was elected a Fellow of the Royal Society of Edinburgh. His proposers were Sir John Graham Kerr, Robert Staig, Edward Hindle and Charles Wynford Parsons.

In 1948, he was awarded an OBE and granted membership of the Royal College of Physicians of London. He was made a Fellow in 1954.

In 1951, he became Professor of Pathology at the Kitchener School of Medicine in Khartoum. In 1955, he left Africa and took the Sinclair Chair in Singapore, and in 1960 moved again to be Professor of Pathology at the University of Hong Kong.

He died on 6 December 1962. He is buried in Hong Kong Cemetery.

== Family ==
He married Elsie Tan Lee Chang, whom he met in Singapore. They had three sons and a daughter.
