= Nazir Dafallah =

Sudanese politician and veterinary (1922–1982)

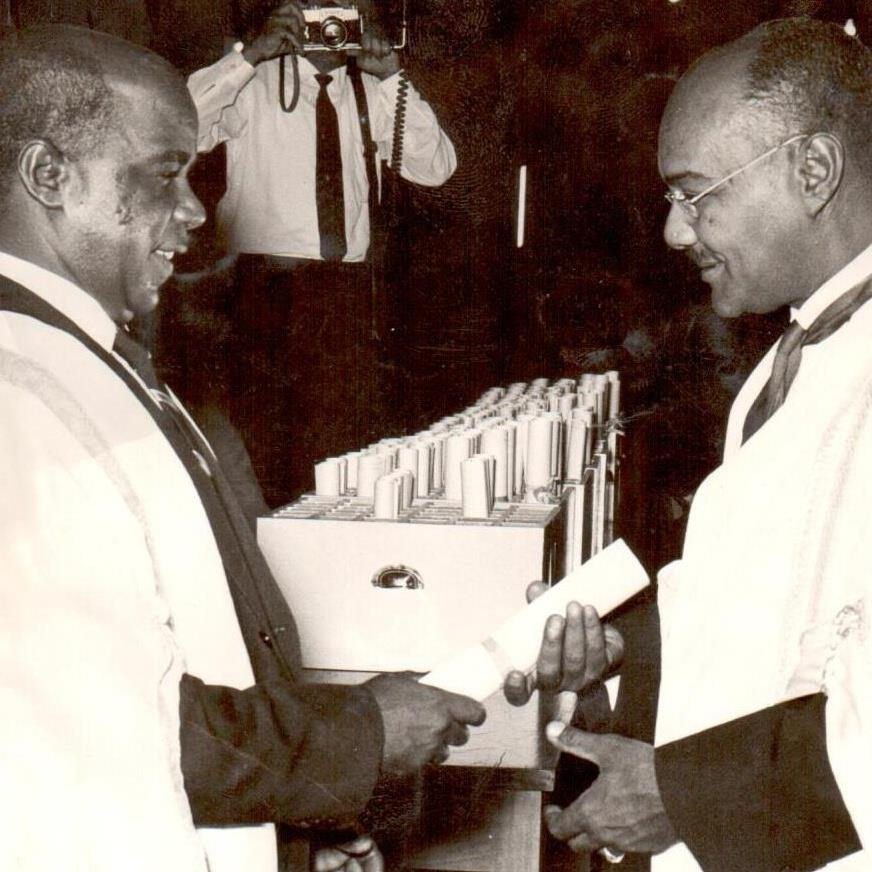
Nazir Dafallah (left) and El-Tigani el-Mahi, c. 1960s

Nazir Dafallah (Arabic: النذير دفع الله, 1922 – 1982) was a Sudanese politician and veterinary.

Dafallah was born on 1 January 1922 in el-Obeid, Kordofan. He had degrees of veterinary sciences from University of Khartoum, and from University of Manchester. He worked as a veterinary officer in government research laboratories at Khartoum. He was a senior lecturer on bacteriology, and later dean in University of Khartoum. He was deputy vice-chancellor in University of Khartoum and professor of bacteriology from 1962 to 1968. He then worked in Ahmadu Bello University in Nigeria from 1971 to 1972.

Dafallah was appointed as the Speaker of the People's Assembly from 1972 to January 1974. He was then appointed as Minister of Health and Social Guidance from July 1974 to January 1975, and then Minister of Health from 1975 to 1979. In 1980s he was Minister of Education. He received several Orders during his lifetime. He died in 1982.
