= List of hospitals in Sudan =

The following is a list of currently operating hospitals in Sudan. As of 2019, there were a total of 272 hospitals in Sudan.

Selected Hospitals in Sudan
Name	Location	Opened	Closed	Coordinates	References
Damazin General Hospital	Ad-Damazin			11.812161386297868°N 34.35951736282396°E	
Al Baraha Hospital (Baraha Medical City)	Khartoum	2002		15.673365447277577°N 32.54433300944904°E	
Aljawda Hospital	Khartoum			15.57643895931577°N 32.53442088061149°E	
Al Shaab Hospital	Khartoum			15.597675565104202°N 32.534437922940576°E	
Al Amal Hospital	Khartoum			15.6280°N 32.5524°E	
Al Faisal Specialized Hospital	Khartoum			15.600204053138382°N 32.52950102776289°E	
Al Fouad Hospital	Khartoum	2008		15.530482105676013°N 32.54729445362459°E	
Khartoum Bahry Teaching Hospital	Khartoum			15.63424900883945°N 32.528209728101864°E	
Doctors' Hospital	Khartoum	1991		15.580328639771523°N 32.54812213255399°E	
El Ban Jadeed Hospital	Khartoum			15.6174311076952°N 32.63210735177662°E	
Fedail Hospital	Khartoum	1992		15.599371265089058°N 32.532373009447692°E	
Ibn Khaldoun Hospital (closed)	Khartoum			15.597746093709436°N 32.537382361983205°E	
Jafar Ibnauf Pediatric Hospital	Khartoum	1977		15.599906297042708°N 32.535013297804234°E	
Khartoum Hospital	Khartoum			15.5972°N 32.5319°E	
International Hospital	Khartoum	1993		15.651415510087478°N 32.526019974504194°E	
Sahiroon Specialised Hospital	Khartoum				
Soba University Hospital	Khartoum	1975		15.5065°N 32.6529°E	
Yastabshiron Hospital	Khartoum			15.575881129697748°N 32.55825025177586°E	
Mother of Mercy Hospital (Catholic)	Kanyuro, Nuba Mountains	2008		11.118914976363268°N 30.628665039512647°E	
Altigany Almahy Hospital	Omdurman	1950			Unknown
Omdurman Maternity Hospital	Omdurman	1957			
Al Tuga Specialized Hospital	Omdurman			15.649437091460268°N 32.489484316966674°E	
Wad Medani Teaching Hospital	Wad Medani, Gezira (state)			14.4346°N 33.7462°E	

== See also ==
- Arabic: List of hospitals in Sudan
- Health in Sudan
