= Babikr Bedri =

Sudanese warrior and activist

Babiker Badri
- بابكر بدري
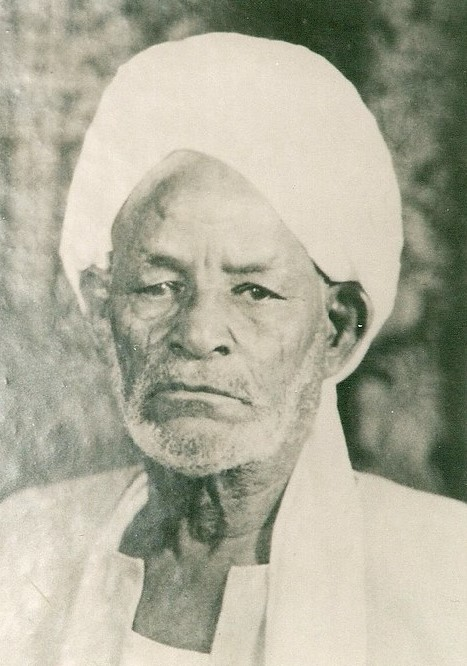
- Born: 1 June 1856; Turkish Sudan
- Died: 1954 (age 97–98); Anglo-Egyptian Sudan
- Occupations: Teacher; Social activist Warrior
- Known for: Role in the Mahdist War and pioneer for women's education in Sudan
- Children: Ali Bedri (son); Malik Badri (son)

Babikr Bedri (Arabic: بابكر بدري; 1 June 1856 – 1954; also spelled Babiker Badri) was a Sudanese statesman, social activist, and Mahdist War veteran who laid the foundations for women's education in Sudan. Bedri began with a small school for his own daughters, and over time, the school moved to Omdurman and formed the basis for today's Ahfad University for Women in Sudan. He was also the last surviving Mahdist veteran of the Mahdist War.

== Military career and social activism ==
During the Mahdist War, Bedri was present at the Battle of Omdurman, where the Mahdist army was destroyed. After the battle he migrated to Rufaa, a small town in the region of the Blue Nile.

There, he founded the first school for girls in Sudan in 1907 and named it 'Al Ahfad'. Initially, the classes were held at his home, and were attended by nine of his own daughters and eight of his neighbours' young girls. The school was inspected by Currie, the Condominium Director of Education, but he warned Bedri that the responsibility was entirely his, as would be the cost of running such a new establishment. A private donation was made that year by Currie's deputy, John Winter Crowfoot. Later the school began to receive funding from the Condominium authorities.

Babikr Bedri's ideas about girls’ education were strongly opposed by older Sudanese who were suspicious of the idea of sending girls to school; the colonial authorities were also wary of an innovation that might unsettle the wider population. Bedri's ideas about female education combined traditional Islamic devotion to learning while providing secular education and religious instruction for both girls and boys. At that time, the main aim of the schooling was to ensure better nutrition and healthcare, with a view that it would ensure healthier children.

In his memoirs Bedri describes taking Miss Evans, the new woman inspector of girls' schools, to Rufaa in the early 1920s and their lively exchange:

During our inspection of the school Miss Evans turned to me and said bluntly,"They keep saying 'Shaykh Babikr this and Shaykh Babikr that.' What IS it so splendid that you have achieved?" With a smile I answered her, "My achievement is your coming to Sudan. In a year or two's time it is I who will be asking you what you have achieved, you may be sure." She was too disconcerted to reply.

On his return to Khartoum, Bedri was taken to task by John Crowfoot, the Director of Education for his remarks to Miss Evans. "In response I asked him why he had selected this inspectress for the girls' schools and related how she had treated his wife. Thereupon he dropped the matter without further censure."

In 1943, the school moved from Rufaa to Omdurman, across the Nile from Khartoum, and a companion high school for boys was established.

In 1991, the Al Ahfad girls' school was transformed into a college and then into the University of that name by Yusuf Badri, Babikr Bedri's son.

== Autobiography ==
Babikr Bedri's autobiography My Life (1961) is considered a Sudanese classic. It is an important source on the history of Sudan in the Mahdist era and the subsequent period of British colonization. These memoirs have been partially translated into English. A first volume (published in 1969) covers the years from Bedri's boyhood in the mid-19th century until the fall of Omdurman in 1898. The second volume appeared in 1980 and covers the period from 1898 to 1927. – As Babikr Bedri himself commented:

"An autobiography contains stories of many kinds, some of no account, except to amuse, and others of significance as examples to be followed or shunned."

== Family and descendants ==
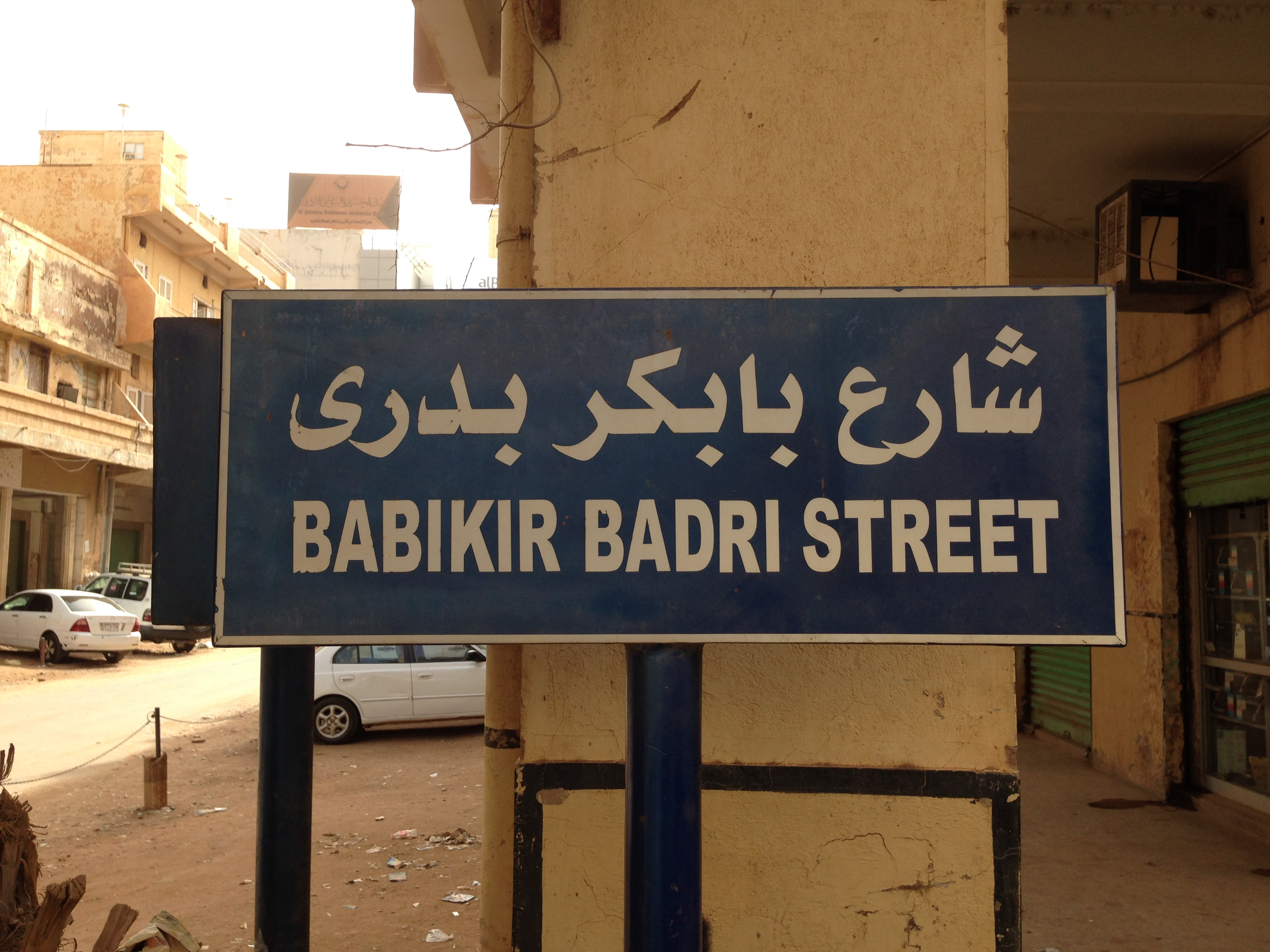
Street sign in downtown Khartoum (2018)

Babikr Bedri's sons Yusuf Bedri and Ali Bedri continued his work, and a grandson, Gasim Badri, became the present president of Ahfad University for Women (AUW). In his long life, Babikr Bedri had five wives and 21 children. His granddaughter Balghis Badri is a feminist activist, and professor of social anthropology at Ahfad University for Women.

One of his many descendants is his great-granddaughter, the BBC news presenter and broadcaster Zeinab Badawi. In a 2018 interview, she talked about her great-grandfather Babiker Badri:

At that time, girls were not educated but my great-grandfather wanted to change this, and he started with his own daughters. Despite the hostility from the British authorities and the Sudanese community, he established a school for his children in his own house.

— Zeinab Badawi, "My hyphenated identity is an advantage"

== Legacy and significance ==
Babikr Bedri was "a pioneer of modern education in a traditional context" write the editors of his first volume of memoirs in English, "and a remarkable personality". From the beginning of the 20th century until his death in 1954 – his age is uncertain, he was either 94 or 98 – he was, in their words, "the outstanding figure in Sudanese education and one of the best known Sudanese intellectuals".

== See also ==
- List of last surviving veterans of military insurgencies and wars
- Ahfad University for Women
- Balghis Badri

== Sources ==
- Babikr Bedri, My Life Story (1961), in 3 volumes, Khartoum: Egypt Press. (In Arabic)
- Bedri, Y. & G. Scott, translators (1969), The Memoirs of Babikr Bedri. Vol. 1. London: Oxford University Press.
- Bedri, Y. & P. Hogg, translators (1980), The Memoirs of Babikr Bedri. Vol. 2. London: Ithaca Press.
