= Carrie Gracie =

British journalist

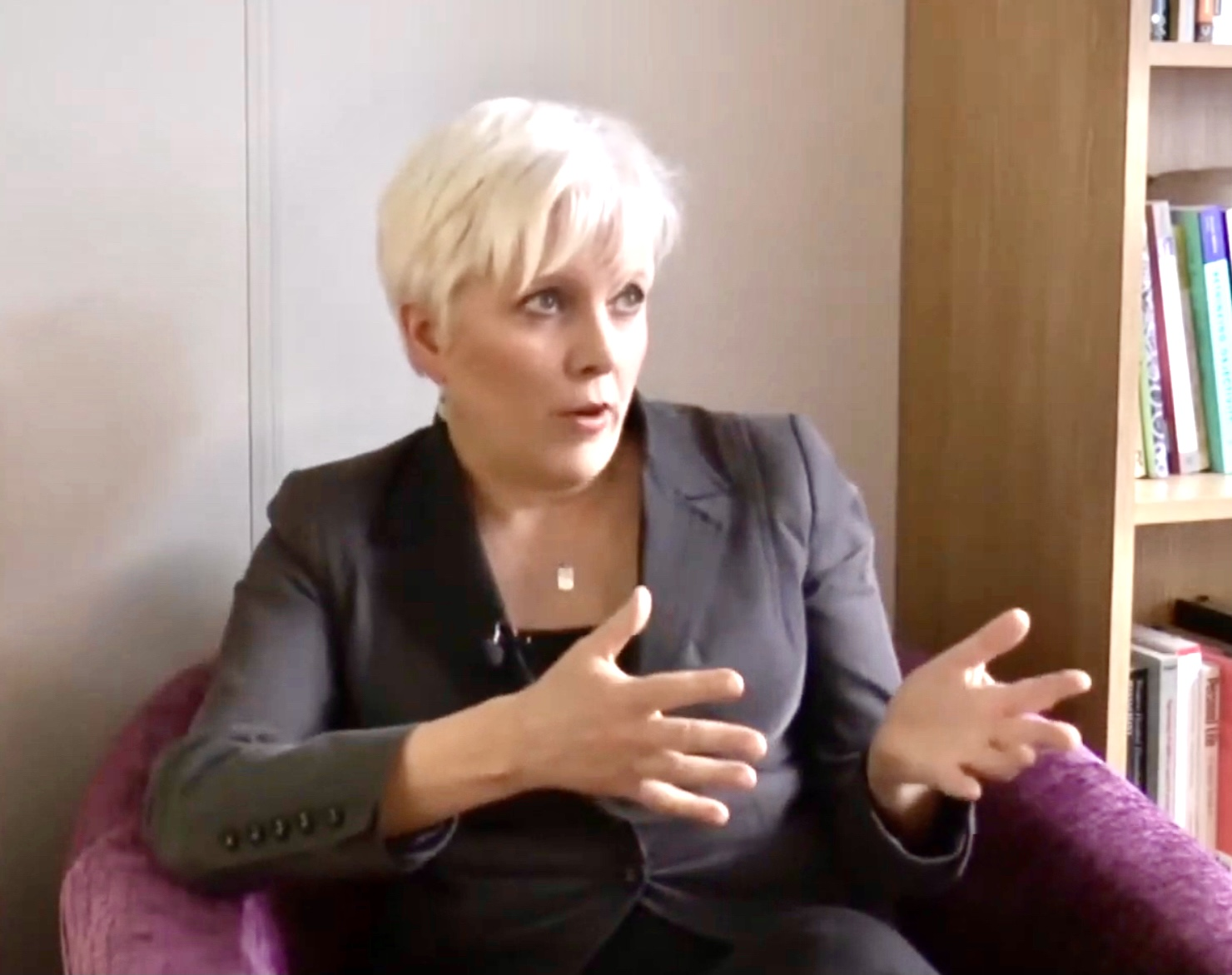
- Gracie in 2019
- Born: 1962 (age 63–64); Bahrain
- Education: University of Edinburgh; University of Oxford; University of Westminster; Middlesex University
- Occupations: News editor, presenter, television producer, newsreader
- Employer: BBC
- Notable credit(s): BBC World Service; Dateline London; BBC News; BBC World News 'Reporters
- Spouse: Jin Cheng (m. 1995, divorced)
- Children: 2

Carrie Gracie (born 1962) is a Scottish journalist and newsreader best known as having been China Editor for BBC News.

She resigned from this post at the beginning of January 2018, citing what she said was subject to sex-based pay discrimination for the BBC's international editors. She returned to her former post in the BBC newsroom until August 2020, when she announced unexpectedly that she would be leaving the corporation to pursue other interests.

== Early life ==
Gracie's father was a Scottish oil executive; Gracie was born in Bahrain while he was on assignment there. She was educated in Aberdeenshire and Glasgow. She studied at the University of Edinburgh, before leaving to run her own restaurant for a year. She then graduated from Hertford College, Oxford with a degree in Philosophy, Politics and Economics.

== Career ==
In 1985 she went to China to teach English and Economics at Yantai and Chongqing Universities. On her return to Britain a year later she managed a small film company. She completed a BA in Chinese in 1996 at the University of Westminster, followed by an MA in Design for Interactive Media from Middlesex University.

=== BBC career ===
Gracie joined the BBC World Service in 1987 as a trainee producer, soon becoming a correspondent as well as on assignment, including African, Chinese and Asia-Pacific regions. She became a correspondent for BBC World Service and then for domestic radio and television in Beijing in 1991. Gracie moved back to the UK in 1999 as a presenter on BBC News and on World Service. For six years from January 2008, she was the main morning presenter for the BBC News Channel on Tuesdays – Fridays alongside Simon McCoy. She is also a presenter for the BBC World Service programme The Interview.

Highlights of her career include covering the death of Deng Xiaoping and the handover of Hong Kong in 1997. Gracie took part in the BBC's coverage of the 2008 Summer Olympics in Beijing, as a co-commentator during the opening and closing ceremonies. In October 2008, she was presented with the inaugural Nick Clarke Award for her interview with BBC journalist Alan Johnston, who was kidnapped by the Palestinian Army of Islam in 2007.

Gracie also appeared in the This World programme. She presented a programme entitled "The Fastest Changing Place on Earth". This followed three villages in China over six years as they became subject to an urbanisation scheme by the Chinese government. The programme was broadcast on 5 March 2012.

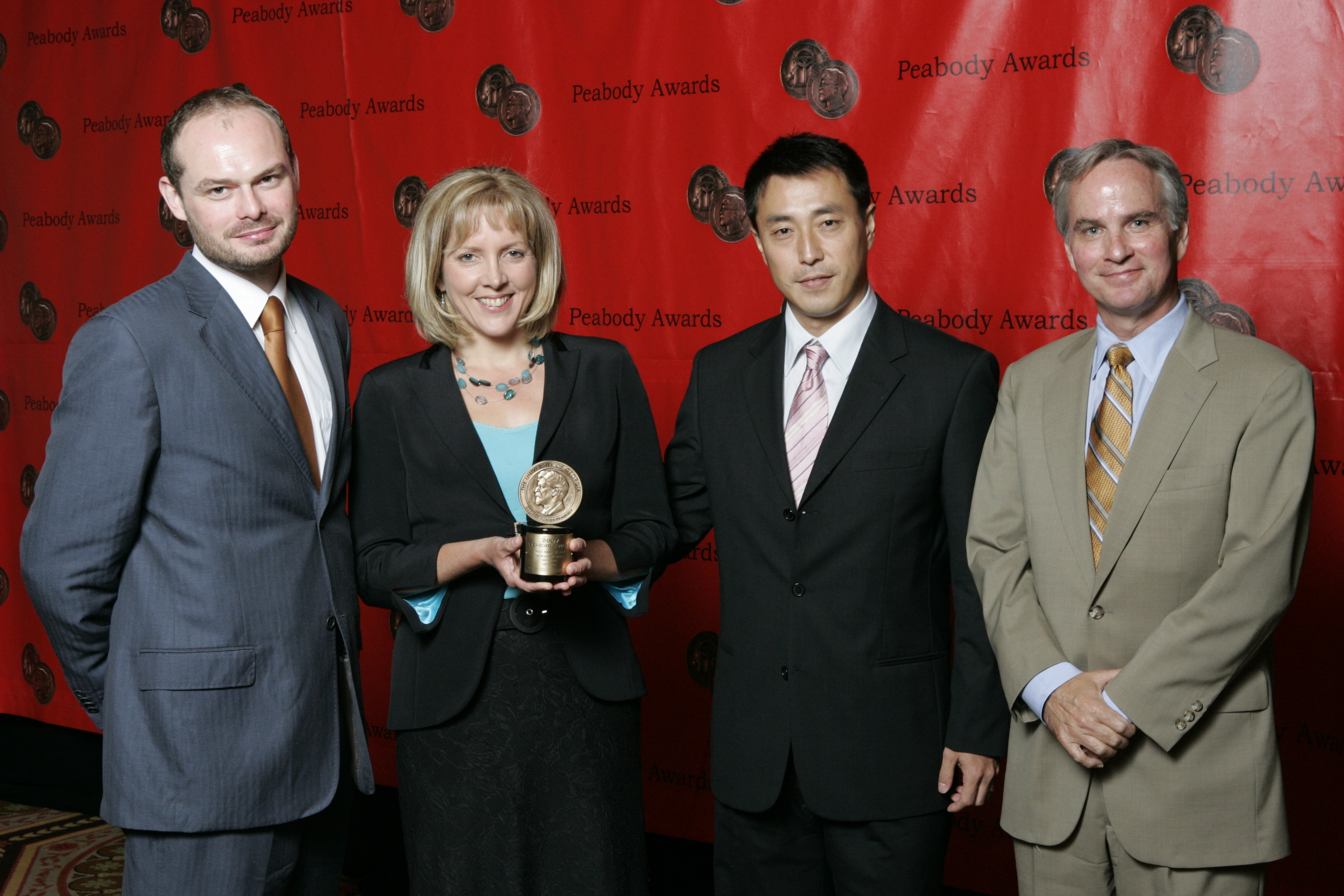
Gracie and the crew of White Horse Village at the 67th Annual Peabody Awards in 2008

In an earlier series of features for BBC World News (TV) and BBC World Service (radio), she had tracked the process of power changes, migration, changing work/educational options and land redevelopment in a single southeastern Chinese village: this series of reports from White Horse village (the place name appearing in the titles of the various parts of the project) aired between ca 2006 and 2008. The first report won a Peabody Awards. A follow-up came in 2015.

In December 2013, she was appointed BBC News' first editor for China based in Beijing. She resigned from this post at the end of December 2017/beginning of January 2018, citing pay discrimination over gender for the BBC's international editors. Her pay was £92,000 in 2009 and it was £135,000 in 2017, but she said the dispute was about parity and not about the amount. Jeremy Bowen, the BBC Middle East editor, earned somewhere between £150,000 and £199,000, while North American editor Jon Sopel earned somewhere between £200,000 and £249,000. The BBC had offered a 33% pay rise but, according to Gracie, had failed to offer equal pay. The dispute occurred against a background of complaints about excessive pay for some employees of the publicly funded BBC. The BBC stated it had "inadvertently" underpaid her by £100,000 because the senior journalist was “in development.”

Gracie returned to her former post in the BBC newsroom on a salary of £145,000. In December 2017 and January 2018, Gracie acted as a guest presenter of the BBC Radio 4 Today programme.

Since returning to London she had often been the main afternoon presenter on weekends either on the BBC News Channel or BBC World News. In June 2018 the BBC agreed to give her years of back pay and to pay her equally with male presenters. Gracie donated the full amount of £361,000 to the Equal Pay Advice Service and the Fawcett Society. In 2018 Gracie took months of unpaid leave in order to take on writing and speaking engagements about both China and gender equality. She returned to work at the BBC News Channel and BBC World News afterwards.

On 25 August 2020, Gracie announced via her Twitter profile that she had presented for the last time and would be leaving the BBC to pursue other interests.

== Personal life ==
Gracie speaks fluent Mandarin. In 1995 she married Chinese rock musician Jin Cheng, with whom she has two children, though the couple later divorced. The children both spent a term in a Chinese school. Gracie lives in Richmond, London. In 2012, she received treatment for breast cancer.

Media offices
New title	China Editor: BBC News; 2014–2018	Position abolished
