= Ali Bedri =

Sudanese physician (1903-1987)

Ali Bedri MBE FRCP
- علي بدري
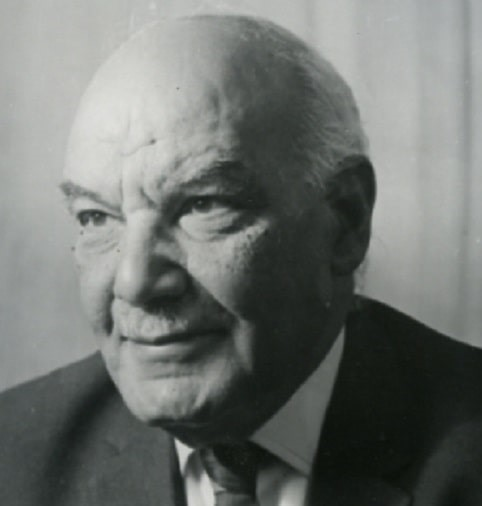
- Ali Bedri in 1970

Minister of Health
- In office 1948–1952
- Governor-General: Robert George Howe
- Preceded by: Office established
- Succeeded by: Mohamed Amin El Sayed

Personal details
- Born: 26 November 1903 Rufaa, Anglo-Egyptian Sudan
- Died: 13 January 1987 (aged 83)
- Parent: Babiker Bedri (father)
- Education: Gordon Memorial College; Kitchener School of Medicine (DKSM)

Ali Bedri MBE (Arabic: علي بدري; 26 November 1903 – 13 January 1987) was a Sudanese physician, and the first Minister of Health of Sudan.

== Life and career ==
=== Early life and education ===
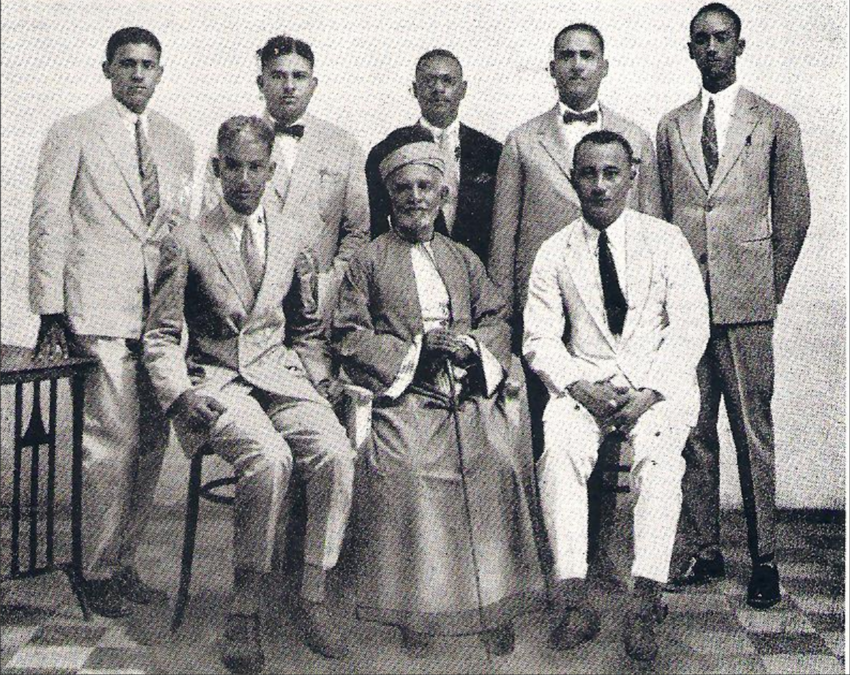
First graduates of the Kitchener School of Medicine in 1928, Hashim Bey Ali seated in the centre. Bedri is seated on the left

Ali Babiker Bedri was born on 26 November 1903 in Rufaa, Blue Nile state. He was the son of Sheikh Babiker Bedri, a Mahdist War veteran and pioneer of women's education in Sudan. Ali Bedri received his early education in Rufaa, where his father established schools. He later attended the Gordon Memorial College in Khartoum, where he graduated as a teacher in 1923. Although he initially pursued a career in teaching, he decided to switch to medicine and became one of the first students to enrol in the Kitchener School of Medicine. In 1928, he graduated with distinction and worked as a medical officer in Singa, Dongola, the Nuba Mountains, and Sennar.

Bedri later went on to become one of the first Sudanese to hold the position of senior medical officer at Omdurman Hospital and Khartoum Hospital. In 1937, he travelled to the United Kingdom for postgraduate training at Hammersmith Hospital. He was made a Fellow of the Royal College of Physicians in 1952.

=== Career ===
Upon his return to Sudan, Bedri was appointed as the first Sudanese doctor to hold the position of assistant deputy director of medical services under Eric Pridie. His prior experience as a medical inspector in various regions of Sudan allowed him to understand the country's health issues and the importance of creating an efficient medical service. With a limited budget and the challenging conditions of World War II, Bedri had the difficult task of determining priorities. Guided by his British teachers and senior colleagues, he developed the vision that made him the first architect of an independent Sudanese medical profession.

Bedri was appointed to the Advisory Council for Northern Sudan and the Sudanisation Committee, and although his civil servant status restricted him from overt political activities, he firmly believed in Sudanese independence. In 1948, Bedri was elected as a member of the first legislative assembly and subsequently appointed as the Minister of Health. Bedri served as Minister of Health in Sudan from 1948 to 1952, during which time he played a significant role in the development and expansion of the country's healthcare services. After voting for the self-government of Sudan, Bedri resigned from his position as Minister of Health and returned to his private medical practice.

During his tenure as Minister of Health before Sudan's independence, Ali Bedri launched a comprehensive ten-year plan aimed at establishing an effective healthcare system in the country. Bedri recognized the importance of postgraduate education and training for Sudanese doctors in both preventive and curative medicine, as well as the need to train paramedics, nursing staff, and workers in maternal and child health.

Bedri continued to play an active role as the president of the Sudan Medical Council from 1968 to 1974, and worked with the Red Crescent. He was widely recognised as the leading figure in Sudanese medicine as he established a solid foundation for medical training and practice, and set high standards of bedside manners and professionalism during a time when there were limited treatments available for many diseases, and antibiotics were nonexistent for endemic diseases. He was always approachable and willing to provide advice to his colleagues, especially younger doctors.

Bedri was also a leading member of the Society for the Abolition of Female Circumcision, Director of the Family Planning Association, and founded the first girls' school in the Sudan.

=== Personal life and death ===
Bedri married Hurum El Amin. Together they had a son, four daughters, and a total of twelve grandchildren.

Bedri died on 13 January 1987.

== Awards and honours ==
Bedir was made a Fellow of the Royal College of Physicians in 1952, and Member of the Order of the British Empire.
