= List of people from the City of Westminster =

This is a list of people from the City of Westminster, England who have become known internationally in different roles and professions. The City of Westminster is a central London borough and is the wealthiest borough in England.

- Adam Ant
- Benedict Arnold
- Jane Asher
- Alfred Jules Ayer
- Charles Babbage
- Francis Beaufort
- Jane Birkin
- Isabella Blow
- David Cameron
- Bertie Carvel
- Richard Tappin Claridge
- William Coldstream
- Wilkie Collins
- Dan Costa (composer)
- Nipper Pat Daly
- Amelia Dimoldenberg
- Cara Delevingne
- Charles Dickens
- Jacqueline du Pré
- T. S. Eliot
- Elizabeth II
- Noel Fielding
- Clement Freud
- Charlotte Gainsbourg
- Gary Glitter
- Edward Gibbon
- Hughie Green
- Richard Hammond
- Alexander Hewat
- Anne Hegerty
- Tom Hiddleston
- Ruth Hubbard
- Christian Jessen
- Belinda Lang
- Edward Lear
- Dua Lipa
- Madonna
- Hayley Mills
- Margie Morris
- Jonathan Myles-Lea
- Henry Neele
- Annie Newton
- Pitt the Elder
- Elizabeth Press
- Stuart Price
- Patrick Procktor
- Corin Redgrave
- George Reynolds
- Wendy Richard
- Daisy Ridley
- Talulah Riley
- Bertram Fletcher Robinson
- Isabella Frances Romer
- Tom Sandars
- Wallis Simpson
- Dodie Smith
- Stephen Spender
- Cat Stevens
- Stephen Ward
- H. G. Wells
- Charles Wesley
- Norman Wisdom
