= Mansour Ali Haseeb =

Sudanese professor of microbiology and parasitology (1910–1973)

Mansour Ali Haseeb FRCP FRCPh
- منصور علي حسيب
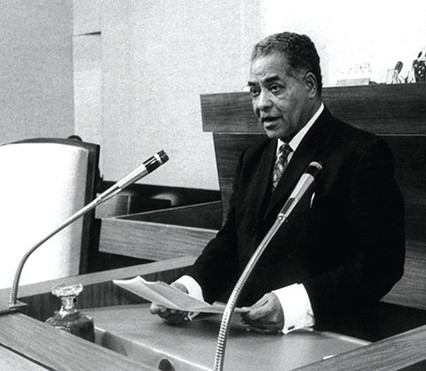
- Haseeb addressing the WHO's General Council after receiving the Shousha Prize in 1973
- Born: 1 January 1910; Al Gitaina, Sudan
- Died: 29 September 1973 (aged 63); Omdurman, Sudan
- Other name: Godfather of Sudan's Laboratory Medicine
- Education: Kitchener School of Medicine
- Awards: Shousha Prize, WHO; Order of the Star of Ethiopia; Order of Merit, United Arab Republic
- Scientific career
- Fields: Bacteriology; Parasitology
- Workplaces: University of Khartoum; Stack Medical Research Laboratories

Director of the Stack Medical Research Laboratories
- In office 1952–1963
- President: Sovereignty Council (1956–1958); Ibrahim Abboud
- Preceded by: Robert Kirk
- Succeeded by: Mohamed Hamad Satti

Mansour Ali Haseeb (Arabic: منصور علي حسيب; 1 January 1910 – 29 September 1973) was a Sudanese professor of microbiology and parasitology.

Haseeb was born into a family of scholars. He graduated with a diploma from the Kitchener School of Medicine and continued his studies in the United Kingdom, obtaining a Diploma in Bacteriology. Haseeb worked in different medical institutions in Sudan before being appointed Director of the Stack Medical Research Laboratories. Further, he became the first Sudanese Dean of the Faculty of Medicine at the University of Khartoum and chairman of the Sudan Medical Research Council.

Haseeb made valuable contributions through his services in vaccine production and implementation programs. In addition, he championed medical research in Sudan to the extent that he is remembered as the "Godfather of Sudan's Laboratory Medicine".

Haseeb also was the Mayor of Omdurman and died suddenly aged 63, shortly after receiving the Shousha Prize from the World Health Organization.

== Life and career ==
=== Early life and education ===
Mansour Ali Haseeb was born on 1 January 1910 (Note: Many Sudanese citizens born before 2000 might not have birth certificates, especially those from rural areas where such documents were unavailable at the time. To address this, individuals can get a confirmation from the Birth Registry stating that their birth is not recorded. They can then present this confirmation to the health commission to receive a substitute health document, which will indicate their age but not their place of birth. Typically, this document lists the date of birth as January 1st, with the estimated birth year, e.g., Jaafar Nimeiry, Abdalla Hamdok, Omar al-Bashir, and Abdin Mohamed Ali Salih.) in al-Gitaina, Sudan, to Sheikh Ali Haseeb, the judge of al-Gitana, and Fatma Mohamed. Haseeb’s family is originally from Berber, Sudan and is known for several members who were renowned scholars.

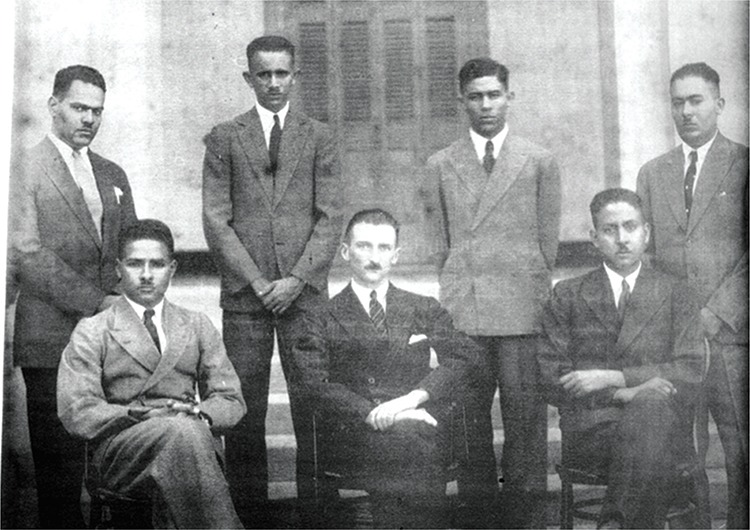
Graduates of Kitchener School of Medicine. Haseeb is sitting first from left.

Haseeb attended primary schools in Berber, Atbara and Port Sudan, before moving to Khartoum to first attend Gordon Memorial College and then to pursue his medical education at Kitchener School of Medicine (now the Faculty of Medicine, University of Khartoum) and Khartoum Civil Hospital. He graduated with the Diploma of the Kitchener School of Medicine in 1937. (Note: other sources mention 1934) He focused on bacteriology and parasitology, and then went to the United Kingdom to obtain a Diploma in Bacteriology in 1943. (Note: other sources mention 1946)

=== Medical career and research ===
Haseeb did his medical training at Khartoum, Dongola, Wadi Halfa, Singa and Geneina Hospitals, before being appointed Director of the Stack Medical Research Laboratories (1952–1962). As a director, Haseeb also introduced a unified policy for training laboratory assistants across the country and the initiation of a technician training program in 1953.

In 1963, Haseeb left Stack to become a professor of Microbiology and Parasitology, and the first Sudanese Dean of the Faculty of Medicine at the University of Khartoum until 1969. At Stack, he was succeeded by Mohamed Hamad Satti. He later became an examiner of the Royal Society of Health in Khartoum, and, in 1973, he was appointed Chairman of the Sudan Medical Research Council.

Bacteriology and parasitology were to be Haseeb's major focus. He made valuable contributions through his services in the vaccine production and implementation programs, most notably in combating smallpox, rabies and epidemic meningitis, He wrote several papers on diseases common to Sudan, like parasitic and contagious infections.

In 1954, Haseeb accompanied Telford H. Work and Richard Moreland Taylor in an expedition to research yellow fever with Baggara tribespeople, Nuba villages, and the Dinka people. The expedition was documented in a film, Reconnaissance for Yellow Fever in the Nuba Mountains, Southern Sudan. Hasseb contributed to 40 scientific papers, published in Nature, The Lancet, the British Medical Journal, and the Journal of Hygiene. Hasseb was editor-in-chief of the Sudan Medical Journal from 1948 to 1958.

Haseeb dedicated his book A Monograph on Biomedical Research in Sudan (1970) to the National Council of Research to benefit young researchers. He is considered the "Godfather of Sudan's Laboratory Medicine" In May 1973, renowned American entomologist and parasitologist Harry Hoogstraal stated, "Professor Mansour Haseeb has been more intimately associated than any other living person with adding to Sudanese biomedical knowledge and sharing the vast experience with younger generations of physicians and scientists."

=== Mayor of Omdurman ===
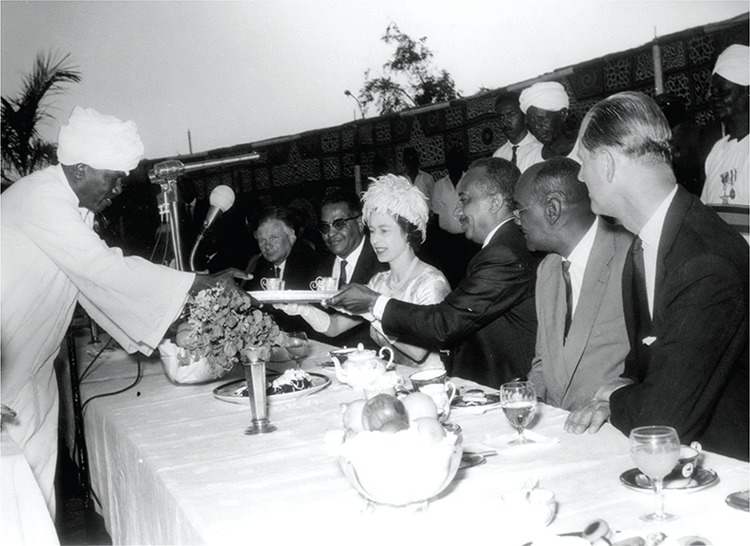
Queen Elizabeth II visited Omdurman in February 1965. Haseeb is seated beside the Queen, positioned to her right.

Haseeb was the Mayor of Omdurman and was invited by Willy Brandt, then Mayor of West Berlin, to visit this city in 1963. He represented Omdurman in welcoming Queen Elizabeth II when she visited in February 1965.

=== Personal life and death ===
Haseeb married Fatma El Bereir in 1944, and they had five children. He enjoyed playing tennis, and translating from English to Arabic.

Haseeb died suddenly on 29 September 1973, aged 63, a few months after receiving the Shousha Medal and Prize from the World Health Organization. Following his death, the Sudanese Medical Student Association organised a commemorative event and photography exhibition to honour his memory. The exhibition, which took place at the Faculty of Medicine, University of Khartoum, was inaugurated by the Sudanese neurologist Daoud Mustafa. The event was held at the Al Baghdadi Lecture Theatre, named after philanthropist Hashim Bey Al Baghdadi, who greatly supported Sudanese medical students. The obituary ceremony featured speeches, including ones by the Dean and President of the Medical Students Association. Hashem Erwa, Haseeb's student, delivered an elegy, followed by Mohammed Hamad Satti, who was unable to finish his eulogy due to overwhelming emotions. Abdullah El Tayib, then the President of the University of Khartoum, highlighted Haseeb's humility and humanity, and Haseeb family's eulogy was given by his son.

== Awards and honours ==
Haseeb was awarded the Order of the Star of Ethiopia by Emperor of Ethiopia, Haile Selassie I, in 1960. In 1962, he received the Order of Merit from the United Arab Republic.

Haseeb was elected a Fellow of the Royal College of Pathologists in 1965 and a Fellow of the Royal College of Physicians of London in 1969. Haseeb received the Shousha Medal and Prize from the World Health Organization on 24 January 1973, (Note: WHO official documents also mentions 15 May 1973) in recognition of his contribution to public health and medical education.

The University of Khartoum named several buildings after him in recognition of his memory, including the Haseeb Dormitory.
