= Assad Hafeez =

Pakistani physician

Assad Hafeez is a Pakistani physician who has been serving as Director-General of Health at the Ministry of National Health Services, Regulation and Coordination since 2010.

== Education ==
Hafeez is a graduate of the Army Medical College. Specialising in paediatrics, he became a fellow of the College of Physicians and Surgeons Pakistan and of the Royal College of Paediatrics and Child Health in the United Kingdom. He holds a master's degree in epidemiology from the London School of Hygiene & Tropical Medicine, and a PhD in public health from the University of Manchester.

== Career ==
After various posts in the public health sector in Pakistan, Hafeez was appointed the Director-General of Health at the Ministry of National Health Services, Regulation and Coordination in 2010. His appointment was welcomed by the medical profession because the post is normally given to a political appointee. In this position, he has led various initiatives including the provision of a National Health Insurance Program designed to cover a population of over 100 million people. He is also the Dean at the Faculty of Medical Science at the Quaid-i-Azam University, and the Dean of the Health Services Academy, where he is responsible for the provision of policy advice to the government.

From 2015, Hafeez represented Pakistan on the Executive Board of the World Health Organization for a four-year term, being elected Vice-Chairman of the Board in May that year and becoming Chairman two years later.

== Other activities ==
- Global Alliance for Vaccines and Immunization (GAVI), Member of the Board

== Publications ==
Hafeez has published more than 60 articles in peer-reviewed journals and is the author of, or a contributor to, a number of books and monographs on public health.
