= Zeinab Badawi =

Sudanese-British broadcaster, educator, civic activist, and writer (born 1959)

- زينب بدوي
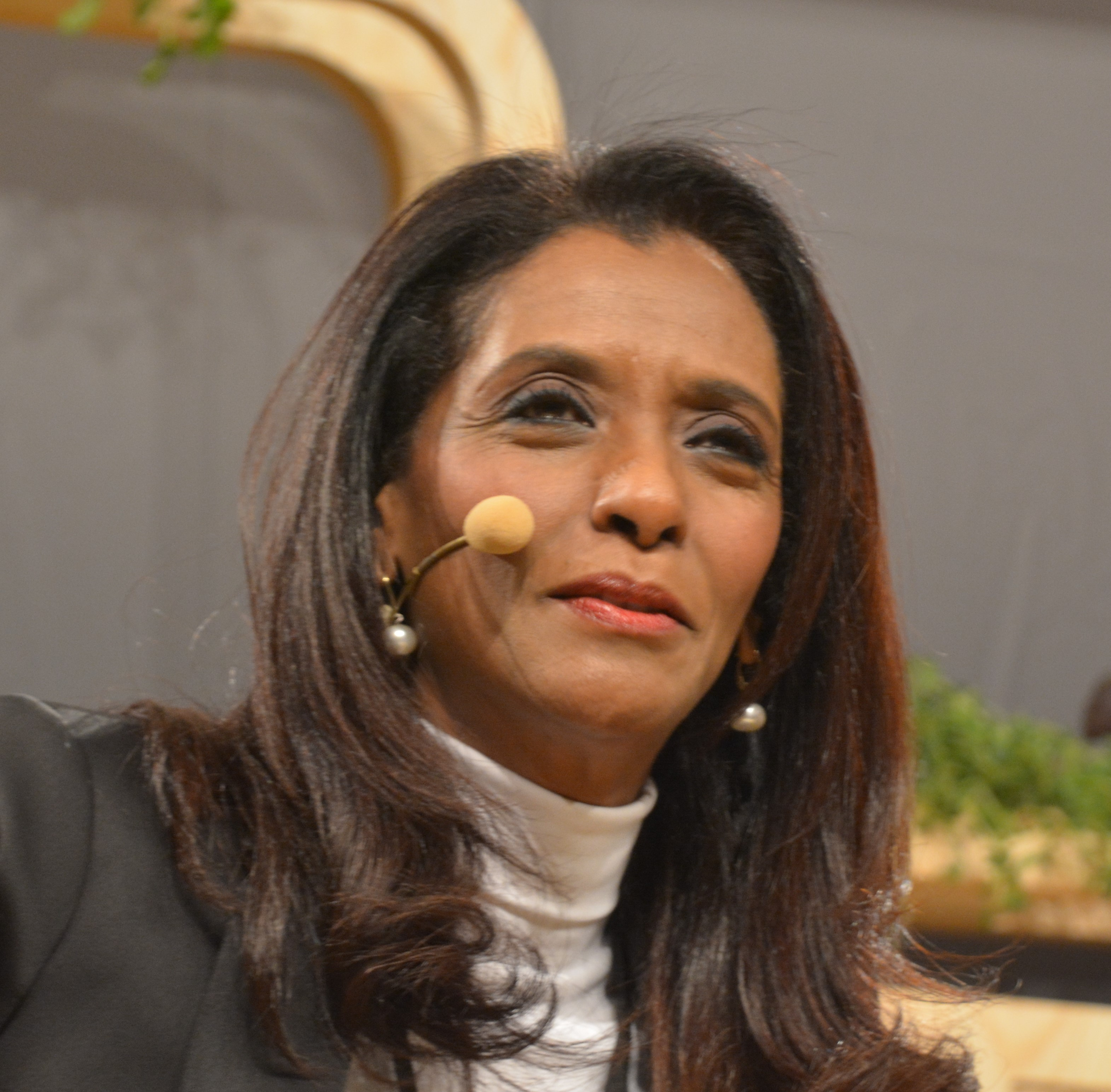
- Badawi at Nobel Week Dialogue in Stockholm, 2016
- Born: Zeinab Mohammed-Khair Badawi; 3 October 1959 (age 67); Khartoum, Sudan
- Education: St Hilda's College, Oxford (BA); SOAS, University of London (MA)
- Occupations: Journalist; Presenter; Newsreader
- Employer: BBC
- Notable credit(s): World News Today with Zeinab Badawi; HARDtalk; GMT; BBC News at Five
- Spouse: David Crook (m. 1991, divorced)
- Children: 4
- Relatives: Babikr Bedri (great-grandfather)

Zeinab Mohammed-Khair Badawi (Arabic: زينب محمد-خير بدوي; born 3 October 1959) is a Sudanese-British television and radio journalist, educator, civic activist, and writer. She was the first presenter of the ITV Morning News (later known as ITV News at 5:30), and co-presented Channel 4 News with Jon Snow from 1989 to 1998 before joining BBC News. Badawi was the presenter of World News Today broadcast on both BBC Four and BBC World News, and Reporters, a weekly showcase of reports from the BBC. In 2021, Badawi was appointed as president of SOAS University of London. Badawi serves on several civic boards and published her first book, An African History of Africa, in 2024.

Badawi was born on 3 October 1959 in Khartoum, to a family of Arab and Ethiopian descent. Her great-grandfather, Babikr Bedri, fought against Kitchener's British forces at the Battle of Omdurman in 1898 and pioneered women's education in Sudan. Badawi's father, Mohammed-Khair El Badawi, was a newspaper editor in Sudan committed to social reform who, when the family moved to the UK, joined the BBC's Arabic Service. Having grown up with an Arabic-speaking family, Badawi speaks both Arabic and English fluently.

At the age of two, Badawi began living in the UK. She was educated at Hornsey High School for Girls in North London, before studying Philosophy, Politics, and Economics at St Hilda's College, Oxford. At Oxford, Badawi was a member of the Oxford University Broadcasting Society. In 1988, she moved back to London to pursue a full-time one-year MA degree in Middle East History and Anthropology at the School of Oriental and African Studies, University of London (her professors were P. J. Vatikiotis for politics, Malcolm Yapp for history and Richard Tapper and Nancy Tapper for anthropology), graduating with distinction in 1989.

== Journalism and awards ==
After graduating from Oxford University, Badawi was a researcher and broadcast journalist for Yorkshire TV from 1982 to 1986, during which time she also presented the weekly regional consumer advice show Help Yourself. After a period at BBC Manchester, she joined Channel 4 News in 1988. Badawi co-presented Channel 4 News from 1989 until 1998 when she joined the BBC.

At the BBC, Badawi worked as presenter and reporter for Westminster live political programmes for five years. She also worked on BBC Radio as a regular presenter of The World Tonight on Radio 4 and BBC World Service's Newshour.

In 2005, Badawi became the new presenter of The World on BBC Four, the UK's first daily news bulletin devoted principally to international news. In May 2007, the programme was rebranded as World News Today and is also shown on the BBC World News channel.

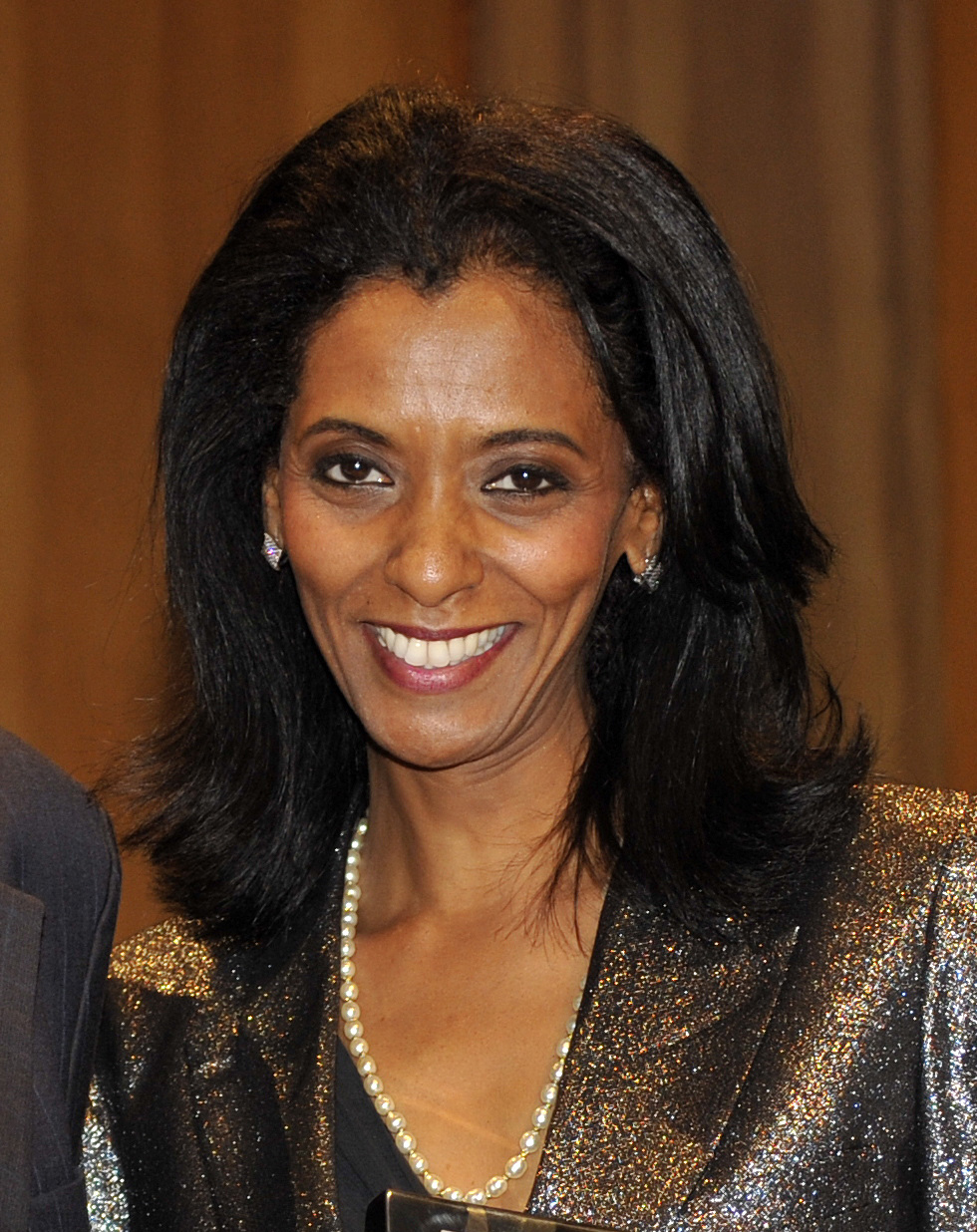
Badawi in 2009

She is a regular presenter of the BBC interview programme HARDtalk. In an exclusive interview in May 2009, Badawi interviewed Sudan's President Omar Al-Bashir, the first serving head of state to be charged with war crimes.

Since 2010, in addition to her presenting role on BBC World News, Badawi has presented on the BBC News Channel and the BBC News at Five.

Badawi was awarded an honorary doctorate by the School of Oriental and African Studies (SOAS) in July 2011.

In May 2014, she was based in Johannesburg, presenting coverage of the South African elections on BBC World News and BBC News Channel.

Since 2013, Badawi has led an annual Nobel laureate discussion in connection with the Nobel festivities in Stockholm, Sweden. The programme is shown on Swedish television.

In 2017, Badawi hosted a nine-part series, The History of Africa, based on UNESCO's General History of Africa. The documentary series was broadcast in July and August 2017 on BBC World News.

Her first book, An African History of Africa, was published in April 2024. It was reviewed in The Guardian by Simukai Chigudu, who wrote: "Ambitious in scope and refreshing in perspective, the book stretches from the origins of Homo sapiens in east Africa through to the end of apartheid in South Africa. It is informed by interviews Badawi conducted with African scholars and cultural custodians, whose expertise, observations and wisdom are threaded through the book." It was shortlisted for the Nero Book Award.

== Other activities ==
- International Crisis Group (ICG), Board of Trustees (since 2023)
- New College of the Humanities, Member of the Advisory Board (since 2011)
- National Portrait Gallery, Member of the Board of Trustees (since 2004)
- British Council, Member of the Board of Trustees
- Foreign Policy Centre, Adviser
- Overseas Development Institute (ODI), Member of the Council
- Royal Opera House, Member of the Board of Trustees
- Royal African Society (RAS), Chair (2014–2021)

Badawi is founder and chair of the Africa Medical Partnership Fund (AfriMed), a charity that aims to help local medical professionals in Africa.

In October 2021, Badawi was appointed as the new President of SOAS University of London.

== Recognition ==
In November 2009, Badawi was named International TV Personality of the Year in the Annual Media Awards, the international media excellence awards organised by the Association for International Broadcasting.

In August 2018, she was awarded the President's Medal of the British Academy "for her contributions to international political journalism".

In November 2021, The Royal Africa Society conferred lifetime achievement award on Badawi for her outstanding contribution to Africa.

== Personal life ==
Badawi married David Crook in 1991. The couple have two sons and two daughters, but are now divorced. She lives in Belsize Park, north London.

== Bibliography ==
- Badawi, Zeinab (2024). An African History of Africa. Mariner Books. ISBN 978-0-06-333541-7.

Media offices
Preceded by new position	Main Presenter of World News Today; 2009–14	Succeeded by Philippa Thomas
