= Philippa Thomas =

British journalist

- Born: 22 November 1965 (age 59)
- Occupation(s): Journalist, presenter, newsreader Executive Coach
- Notable credit(s): World News Today with Philippa Thomas; BBC World News; BBC News; GMT; Impact; Global
- Spouse: Richard Lister
- Children: One son

Philippa Thomas (born 22 November 1965) is a former television newsreader and journalist, both domestic and foreign. At the BBC she was a chief news presenter at BBC World News, presenting evening bulletins on BBC News Channel and BBC World News. She was presenter of Coronavirus: Your Stories on BBC World News and the BBC News Channel. She left the BBC in 2021 to become a full-time Executive Coach.

== Early life and education ==
She was raised in Wakefield, West Yorkshire, the daughter of an English teacher and an air force pilot and attended a state comprehensive. Thomas joined University College, Oxford to study English Literature in 1984, she switched to Philosophy, Politics and Economics a year later.

== Career ==
After graduating from university with a double first, Thomas gained a place on the BBC News Trainee scheme. Of the eight in her intake, she was the only woman. Thomas has reported extensively from the United States, South America, Africa, and continental Europe. She was posted as presenter and special correspondent in the BBC Washington bureau from 2007 to 2011 where she presented the 22:00 ET edition of World News Today, a one-hour news programme on the BBC World News and BBC News. She also anchored live political coverage, and filmed original features on U.S. politics, economics and culture. Her stories aired on BBC World News, PBS news broadcasts, BBC America's World News America, and BBC Online.

From 1997 to 2001, she was also a BBC North America correspondent, providing headline news from the impeachment of President Clinton to the global impact of the 9/11 attacks. From 1990 to 1997, she was a BBC Political Correspondent reporting from Westminster, Belfast and Dublin, including extensive coverage of the Northern Ireland peace process.

While a Nieman Journalism Fellow (2010–2011) at Harvard University, studying digital media and citizen journalism, a blog post by Thomas reporting a comment by P.J. Crowley received wide coverage, and resulted in Crowley's resignation. She returned to the UK in July 2011 to resume her role as a BBC correspondent.

From January 2013, Thomas was a full time presenter on the relaunched BBC World News, initially as the main presenter of World News Today. She was also an occasional presenter of The World Tonight on BBC Radio 4 and Newshour on the BBC World Service.

Thomas was a special elections presenter, anchoring rolling news coverage of UK and US elections on BBC World Service and BBC Radio 4.

In 2018, Thomas made a cameo appearance as herself in Jurassic World: Fallen Kingdom.

On 24 July 2021, Thomas presented the BBC One Weekend News Evening and Late bulletins for the first time.

Thomas left the BBC after thirty three years in 2021.

After completing an MSc at the University of East London she was accredited by the Association for Coaching and set up a business as an Executive Coach.

Thomas also sits on the board of the charity UK Music Masters which offers free violin and cello tuition to pupils in state primary schools, and works to boost diversity and inclusion in the UK music sector.

Media offices
Preceded by Zeinab Badawi	Main Presenter of World News Today; 2014–2017	Incumbent
Preceded by Kirsty Lang	Deputy Presenter of World News Today; 2013–2014; 2017–present	Succeeded by Karin Giannone & Kasia Madera
