= Gasim Badri =

Sudanese academics

- Born: December 12, 1946 (age 79); Omdurman
- Citizenship: Sudan
- Occupation: Educationist
- Father: Yusuf Bedri
- Family: Babikr Bedri
- Awards: Professor

Gasim Badri (born December 12, 1946) is a Sudanese educator, professor and president of Ahfad University for Women in Sudan. He was an advocate for the development of women in Sudan's educational sector.

== Early life ==
He was born in Omdurman, to the family of Yusuf Badri who was the founder of the first women's university in Sudan. His grandfather was Babikr Bedri who pioneered girls education in Sudan in 1907.

== Education ==
He had his education from kindergarten to secondary in Ahfad. Badri went to the American University of Beirut where he studied history and psychology. In 1978, he obtained his PhD. from University of California, Santa Barbara in Early Childhood Education.
