= Ahfad University for Women =

Private university for women in Sudan (IAU-009763)

Coordinates: 15°38′41″N 32°28′17″E

Ahfad University for Women (AUW)
- جامعـــة الأحفـــاد للبنـــات
- Motto: Women's Education Since 1907
- Type: Private
- Established: 1966; 60 years ago
- President: Prof. Gasim Badri
- Location: Omdurman, Khartoum, Sudan
- Website: www.ahfad.edu.sd

Ahfad University for Women (Arabic: جامعة الأحفاد للبنات, romanized: Jāmiʻat al-Aḥfād lil-Banāt) is a private women's university in Omdurman, Sudan that was founded in 1966, by Yusuf Badri, son of the Mahdist soldier Babiker Badri. The university began with only 23 students and 3 teachers. It was the first Sudanese women's college. The current president is Prof. Gasim Badri, Yusuf Badri's son.

== History ==
Ahfad University for Women was founded in a familial tradition of educating girls in Sudan. After the battle of 1898 when Sudanese Mahdist forces were defeated by the Anglo-Egyptian army, Babiker Badri — a Sudanese survivor — settled in the village of Rufu'a. It was there that he opened a secular school for boys. In 1904, he asked the British authorities for permission to open an elementary school for girls — who he believed also needed to be educated. His request was denied twice, before it was finally granted by James Currie, the Director of the Educational Department of the British administration in Sudan. In 1907, Babiker Badri opened his secular school for girls in a mud hut with nine of his own daughters along with eight neighborhood girls.

The Badri family carried on this tradition of private education for three generations in Sudan. Babiker's son Yusuf established Ahfad University in 1966, and it started with only 23 students and three faculty members, including Yusuf.

The university was granted full university status in 1995 by the Sudan National Council for Higher Education, due to its expansion of curriculum and student body. It is the oldest and largest private university in Sudan to date.

In a 2018 interview, British-Sudanese journalist Zeinab Badawi talked about her great-grandfather Babiker Badri:

At that time, girls were not educated but my great-grandfather wanted to change this, and he started with his own daughters. Despite the hostility from the British authorities and the Sudanese community, he established a school for his children in his own house.

— Zeinab Badawi, “My hyphenated identity is an advantage”

== Schools ==
The university has the following undergraduate schools:

- School of Management Studies (formerly School of Organizational Management)
- School of Health Sciences(formerly School of Family Sciences)
- School of Psychology and Pre-School Education
- School of Rural Extension Education and Development
- School of Medicine
- School of Pharmacy.

It offers graduate programs in:

- Human Nutrition
- Gender and Development
- Gender and Peace Studies
- Gender Migration and Multicultural studies
- Sustainable Rural Development
- Business Administration
- Microfinance
- Counseling and Heath Psychology
- High Diploma in Teaching of English as a Foreign Language
- High Diploma in Teaching of Family Sciences

AUW's medium of instruction is English.

== See also ==
- Education in Sudan
- List of current and historical women's universities and colleges
- List of universities in Sudan
