= El Sheikh Mahgoub Gaafar =

Sudanese microbiologist (born 1935)

Professor El Sheikh Mahgoub Gaafar FRCP
- الشيخ محجوب جعفر
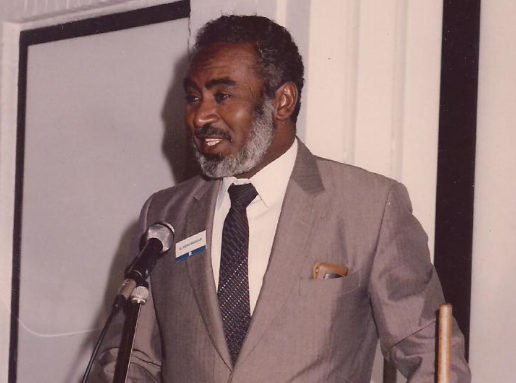

Minister of Education, Higher Education and Scientific Research
- In office 1988–1989

Personal details
- Born: 2 March 1935 (age 91) Nuri, Sudan
- Website: King of Mycetoma
- Scientific career
- Education: University of Khartoum (MBBS); University of London (PhD)
- Awards: Shousha Prize, WHO; Ademola Prize, RSTMH
- Fields: Mycology; Tropical disease Microbiology
- Institutions: University of Khartoum; King Saud University; WHO

El Sheikh Mahgoub Gaafar (Arabic: الشيخ محجوب جعفر; born 2 March 1935 in Nuri) is a Sudanese mycologist and an international authority on mycetoma and bacteriology. He was awarded Shousha Prize by the World Health Organization.

== Life and career ==
=== Early life and education ===
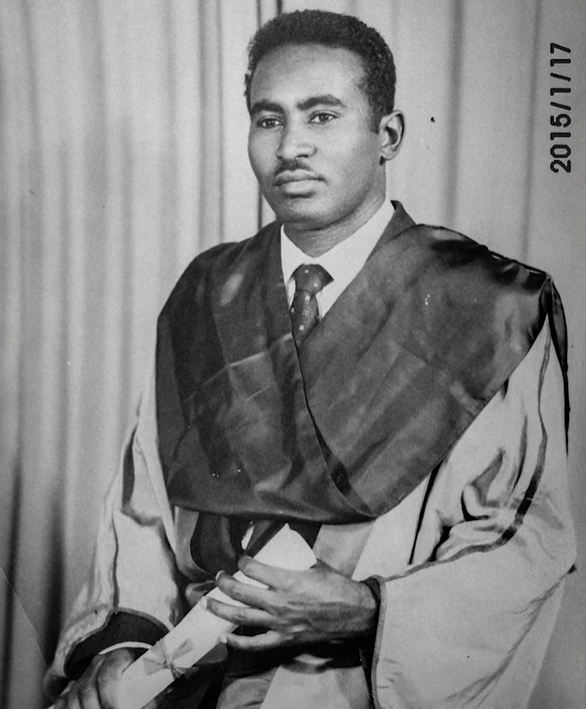
Gaafar graduating 1961

Gaafar was born on 2 March 1935 in Nuri, Karima, Sudan. He attended Karima Primary School, then moved to Shendi Rural Intermediate School, Shendi, and completed high school at Wadi Seidna Secondary School, Khartoum. He obtained a Bachelor of Medicine and Bachelor of Surgery (MBBS) with a Distinction from the University of Khartoum in 1961.

Gaafar started his medical training as a research assistant at the department of bacteriology and parasitology at the University of Khartoum before completing a PhD from London School of Hygiene & Tropical Medicine, the University of London in August 1965. Gaafar graduated with a Diploma in bacteriology from the University of London in 1966.

=== Career ===
Upon his return to Sudan, Gaafar was appointed a lecturer in the Department of Bacteriology and Parasitology, University of Khartoum. He was subsequently promoted to senior lecturer in 1969, a Reader in 1972, and a professor in 1974, the same year he was awarded an MD in Microbiology. In 1968, he established a mycetoma ward and clinic in Khartoum North Civil Hospital, and in 1972, Gaafar worked as Consultant to the World Health Organization in Teheran, Iran.

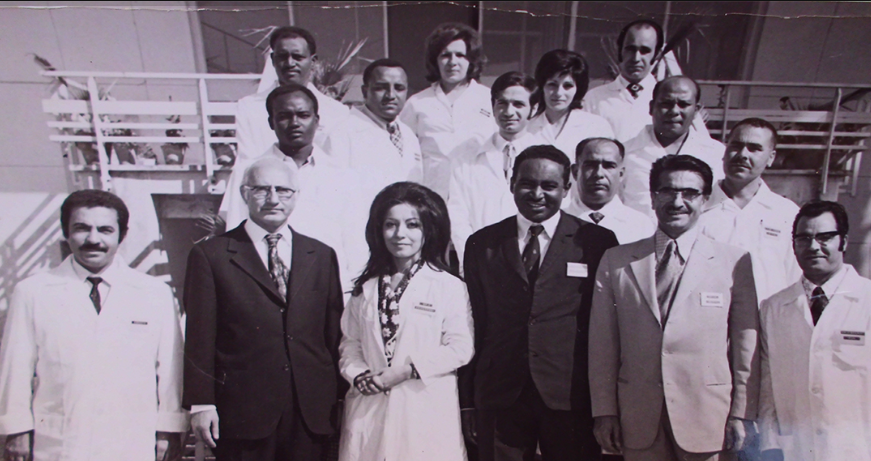
Gaafar (centre front row) in front of Tehran Central Lab, 1972

Gaafar gained experience in clinical microbiology diagnosis at the West Middlesex University Hospital and the London School of Hygiene & Tropical Medicine between 1976 and 1977. He joined King Saud University as a professor in medical microbiology in 1977 because he could not return to Sudan after the 1969 Sudanese coup d'état and Jaafar Nimeiry seizing power (1969–1985) due to his association with the National Umma Party which was banned. Gaafar established the department of microbiology, later recognised by the Royal College of Pathologists, and the Mycoses Clinic. He became the Founding Dean of the department of microbiology from 1979 until 1984.

When the Sudanese Defence Minister Abdel Rahman Swar al-Dahab seized power from Sudanese President Jaafar Nimeiry in the 1985 Sudanese coup d'état, Gaafar returned to Sudan as a professor and head of the department of microbiology and parasitology, University of Khartoum, where he remained until 1988. He was then appointed as the Minister of Education, Higher Education and Scientific Research as part of the National Umma Party's Third coalition, which lasted until 1989 when Colonel (later Lieutenant General) Umar Hassan Ahmad al Bashir overthrew Sadiq al Mahdi and established the Revolutionary Command Council for National Salvation to rule Sudan.

Gaafar served on the World Health Organisation Expert Committee (Parasitology) from 1975–1990. Between 1990 and 1995, he was selected as a Regional Adviser for Tropical Diseases Research, WHO. He then became a Director of Health Services Development until 1997, before becoming a Regional Adviser for Educational Development for Health between 1997 and 1998.

Gaafar was the editor-in-chief for Eastern Mediterranean Health Services Journal (1990–1994), a member of the editorial board of the Journal of Medical and Veterinary Mycology, a member of the Editorial Panel of Mycopathologia, a member of the Khartoum University Press Editorial Committee, and referee to the Transactions of the Royal Society of Tropical Medicine and Hygiene. Gaafar was a chairman of the Council of Omdurman Islamic University (1986–1988), and a chairman of the Medical Research Council, Sudan (1986–1988).

=== Personal life ===
Gaafar married Enam Abd al-Rahman al-Mahdi (died 10 July 2020), sister of Sadiq al Mahdi.

== Awards and honours ==
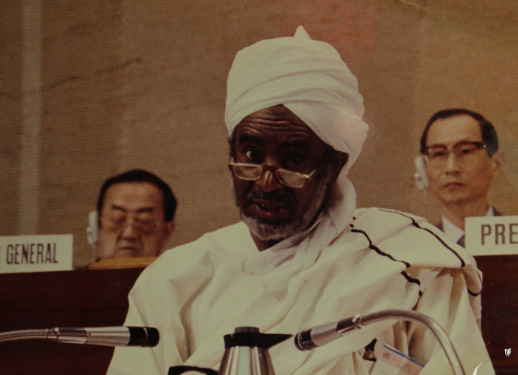
Gaafar addressing the WHO's General Council after receiving Shousha Prize, Geneva, 1989

Gaafar was elected a Fellow of the Royal Society of Tropical Medicine and Hygiene in 1964, and a Fellow of the Royal College of Physicians (FRCP) in 1985. He received the Ademola Prize from the London School of Hygiene and Tropical Medicine in 1987, and Shousha Prize from the World Health Organization in 1989.

== See also ==
- El Hadi Ahmed El Sheikh
- Ahmed Hassan Fahal
- Mohamed El-Amin Ahmed El-Tom
