= Ministry of Health (Sudan) =

Government ministry of Sudan

- Arabic: وزارة الصحة الاتحادية

Agency overview
- Formed: 1949; 77 years ago
- Superseding agency: Ministry of Health
- Jurisdiction: Government of Sudan
- Headquarters: Khartoum, Khartoum State
- Minister responsible: Haitham Ibrahim
- Website: www.fmoh.gov.sd

Ministry of Health (Arabic: وزارة الصحة الاتحادية) is the government ministry, which is responsible for health affairs in the Sudanese government.

== History ==
Modern healthcare in Sudan can be dated back to few smaller hospitals being built in 1899 when Sudan was under the Anglo-Egyptian Condominium. In 1905 the Medical department and the Clean Sanitary Board were established in Sudan. In 1924 the Sudan Medical Services, were established, headed by a director responsible for all of Sudan, including Southern Sudan. The Ministry of Health was established in 1949, seven years before Sudan gained its independence. Ali Badri was the first appointed Health Minister of Sudan.

== State ministries ==
From 1951 to 1960 municipal and local council were responsible for providing basic services, including health related services. In 1960 the provincial law the Ministry of Health was established on the provincial governate level. In 1980 Sudan was divided into five provinces and the Southern Sudan was divided in to three provinces. These provinces each had their own governments which were responsible of things such as Health, education and social welfare. In all provinces expect Khartoum and the Central Region Health affairs were under the ministry of social welfare.

The State ministries oversee local healthcare operations like medical laboratories, rural hospitals and healthcare centers.

== Ministers ==
#	Office Holder	Term start date	Time in office
1	Ali Bedri	1948	5–6 years
2	Mohamed Amin El Sayed	1954	3–4 years
3	Mohamed Nour El Din	1958	3–4 years
4	Mohammed Ahmed Al-Zaki	1958	5–6 years
5	Al-Amin Mohammed Al-Amin	1964	1 years
6	Ahmed Bahari	1965	1 years
7	Ahmed Zain Al-Abidin	1966	2 years
8	Maurice Sidra	1969	1 years
9	Abu al-Qasim Muhammad Ibrahim	1970	4 years
10	Nazir Dafallah	1974	2 years
11	Khalid Hassan Abbas	1974	5–6 years
12	Ali Muhammad Fadi	1982	1–2 years
13	Abdul Salam Issa	1984	0–1 years
14	Hussein Abu Saleh	1985	? years
15	Awad Muhammad Issa		
16	Mamoun Yusuf		
17	Shakir al-Siraj	1989	? years
18	Bahr Idriss Abu Garda	2011	? years
19	Mohamed Abu Zeid Mustafa		? years
20	Akram Al-Toumi	2019	0–1 years
21	Muaz Omer Bakhit	2025	0–1 years
22	Haitham Ibrahim	2026	0 years
