= Faculty of Medicine, University of Khartoum =

University faculty in Khartoum, Sudan

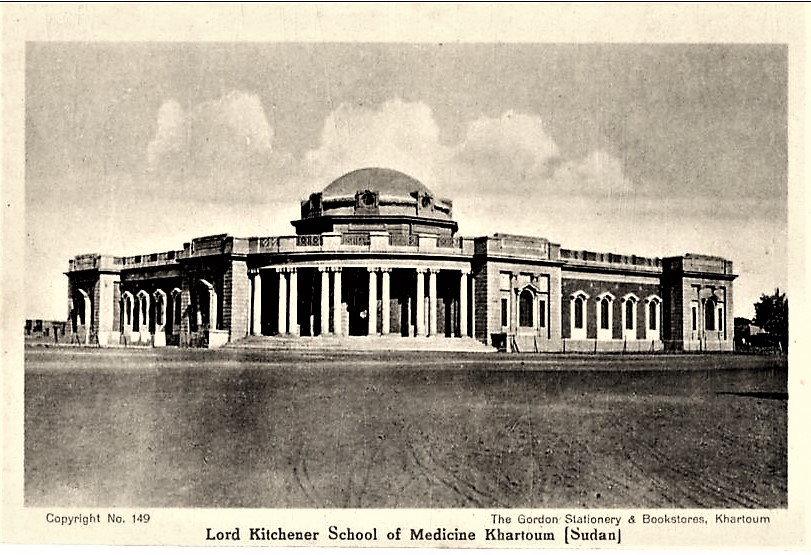
Kitchener School of Medicine Khartoum in 1937

The Faculty of Medicine, University of Khartoum (established 1924 as Kitchener School of Medicine), located in Khartoum, Sudan, is the oldest medical school in Sudan. It was opened in 1924 by Sir Lee Stack, Governor-General of Sudan and Sirdar (General) of the Egyptian army, in memory of Herbert Kitchener, the Governor-General of Sudan from 1898 to 1900.

== History ==
=== Kitchener School of Medicine ===
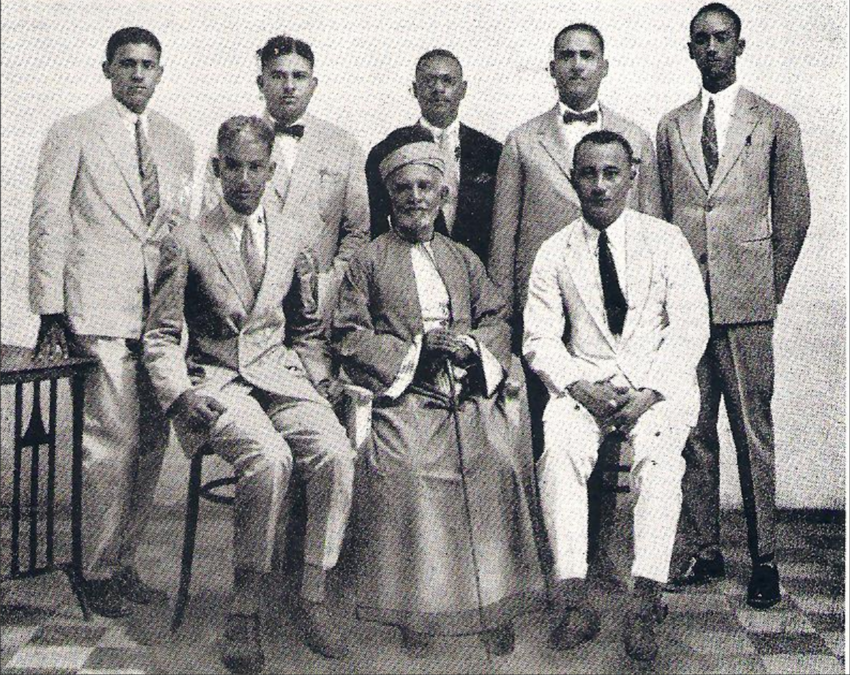
First graduates of the Kitchener School of Medicine, 1928. In the centre is Ahmed Bey Hashim Al Baghdadi (d. 1933) had left all of his fortune to the Kitchener School of Medicine. Standing from left to right: Tahir Yousif, Ahmed Akasha, Fadil Al Bushra, Daoud Iskander, Al Nour Shams Al Din. Sitting from left to right Ali Badri, Hashim Bey Al Baghdadi, Amin Al Sayed.

The school was founded with funds raised from the public, mostly from the United Kingdom. Yearly running costs were financed by endowments and by Sudan government subsidies. The initial intake of students in 1924 was seven.

Students transferred from Gordon Memorial College's School of Science to the Kitchener School and studied for six years from 1939 onwards, before taking their final examinations to earn Diploma of Kitchener School of Medicine (DKSM). The school's diploma was recognised by the Royal College of Physicians of London, UK and the Royal College of Surgeons of England, UK. Kitchener School of Medicine joined Khartoum University College in September 1951.

=== Faculty of Medicine, University of Khartoum ===
After independence in 1956, University College became the University of Khartoum, Kitchener School of Medicine became the Faculty of Medicine, University of Khartoum, and students started graduating with an M.B.B.S. degree. In 2012, the annual intake of new students into the Faculty of Medicine was about 350, and there were about 201 full-time staff, plus many part-time staff. The Faculty of Medicine offers both undergraduate and postgraduate studies and has 14 academic departments.

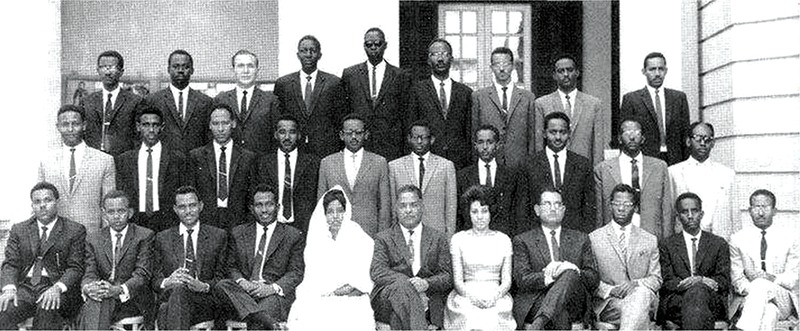
Professor Mansour Ali Haseeb, Dean Faculty of Medicine, University of Khartoum (1963–1969) (sitting in the middle) with the Graduates in 1965. Sitting second from right: Prof Abdel-Galil M. Abdel-Gadir, Professor of Physiology, College of Medicine, King Saud University, Riyadh, Saudi Arabia. Standing fourth from right (first row): Prof Mohamed Ibrahim Ali Omer, Ex – President of the Sudan Association of Paediatricians, and former Editor-in –Chief, Sudanese Journal of Paediatrics. Standing fourth from right (second row): The Late Prof Eldaw Mukhtar, Ex-Dean, Faculty of Medicine
