= BBC Persian Television =

BBC News Persian فارسی
- Country: United Kingdom
- Broadcast area: Afghanistan; Iran; Tajikistan
- Network: BBC World Service
- Headquarters: Broadcasting House, London

Programming
- Language: Persian
- Picture format: 1080p (16:9 HDTV)

Ownership
- Owner: BBC
- Sister channels: BBC News

History
- Launched: 14 January 2009; 17 years ago

Links
- Website: bbc.com/persian

Availability

Terrestrial
- Oqaab (Afghanistan): Channel 15

Streaming media
- BBC Online: Watch live

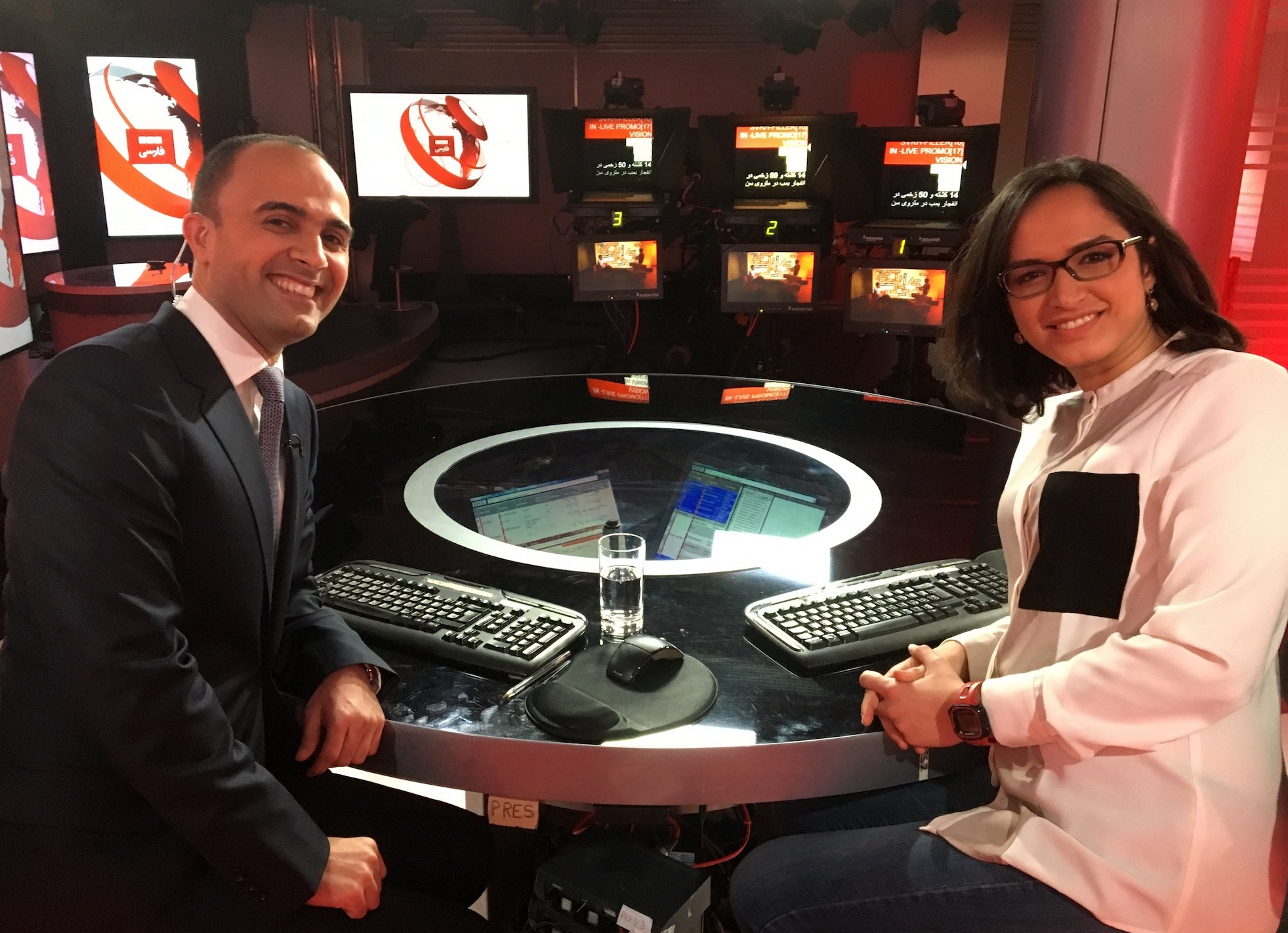
BBC Persian TV presenters Majid Afshar & Rana Rahimpoor, 2017

BBC News Persian (Persian: تلویزیون فارسی بی‌بی‌سی), formerly BBC Persian Television Televizion-e Fârsi-ye BBC) is the BBC's Persian language news channel that was launched on 14 January 2009. The service is broadcast by satellite and is also available online. It is aimed at the 120 million Persian-speakers (Both native and secondary speakers) in Iran, Afghanistan, Tajikistan, and Uzbekistan.

Persian has one of the fewest native and total speakers in the BBC World Service, with approximately 127 million speakers (L1 and L2), with 35 million, 11 million, 9 million and 5 million native speakers in Iran, Afghanistan, Tajikistan and Uzbekistan, respectively.

Iranian authorities have been known to harass and intimidate family members of the BBC Persian staff. BBC director Mark Thompson said that the staff of BBC Persian had been subject to "increased levels of intimidation alongside disturbing new tactics" by the Iranian government.

== History ==
The annual budget of £15 million (2010) was funded by the Foreign and Commonwealth Office, but as with the BBC World Service which is also funded by the FCO, the BBC remains editorially independent, though some Iranian media have accused the British Government of using the service as a propaganda tool. The Iranian government issued a statement denouncing the new service as 'suspicious and illegal', and 'working against the interests of the Islamic Republic'. On 1 April 2014, all World Service funding transferred to the Licence Fee model, which is paid for by all UK residents who watch television as it is broadcast.

As of November 2017, BBC Persian has an audience of 13 million Iranians.

== Controversies ==
In June 2009, BBC Persian's Hot Bird satellite broadcasts along with those of BBC Arabic Television, other BBC services, and those of other broadcasters were experiencing interference due to a jamming signal originating from within Iran. In response, BBC Persian started transmission on other satellites and increased their broadcast hours in order to combat the interference

The channel has been accused by Iranian state television of encouraging "illegal" rallies and manipulating the Iranian people against the Islamic Republic, a claim which the BBC denies.

The jamming resumed on 20 December 2009, soon after BBC Persian began extended coverage of the protests resulting from the death of leading reformist cleric Grand Ayatollah Hoseyn Ali Montazeri, and on 28 December 2009, BBC Persian ceased its transmission from the Hot Bird 6 satellite, however, transmissions continued from the Telstar 12, Eutelsat W2M and Atlantic Bird 4A satellites.

BBC Persian returned to a different frequency on Hot Bird 6 on 26 May 2010, after a period of test transmissions. After a new jamming in February 2011 on Hotbird, BBC Persian showed for some months only a test card along with the audio of their service. Since February 2012, BBC Persian has resumed broadcasting on Hotbird again.

Due to the ban on foreign reporters in Iran, the news service currently relies on a significant amount of user-generated content, often taken with mobile phones.

In 2017, Iranian authorities seized the Iranian assets of 152 contributors to BBC Persian, while in 2016 they detained former BBC World Service Trust employee Nazanin Zaghari-Ratcliffe.

The Iranian government has "targeted" the members and family members of BBC Persian through threats, intimidation, and arrests. In 2018 the BBC made a request to the UN Human Rights Council to "stop Iran from harassing its Persian service staff in London and their families in Iran."

In June 2021 the BBC made a complaint to the UN about the Islamic Republic continuing to harass BBC Persian staff through kidnapping threats.

== Awards ==
It appears that Iranian presidential election, 2009 and what followed greatly elevated BBC Persian TV's stature and importance. It became the channel that extensively covered the events for the Iranians inside Iran. Outside of Iran, the channel was therefore recognised accordingly.

On 4 November 2009, BBC Persian TV was honoured for the "Clearest coverage of a single news event – television" by the Association for International Broadcasting at its annual global media excellence awards at a gala event in London, England. The award was for "the elections that shook Iran". It was a half-hour narration of the unrest that developed in the streets of Iran immediately after the disputed June presidential elections.

On 20 November 2009, BBC Persian TV was honoured at the 12th annual Hot Bird TV Awards in Venice, Italy. It was named best news channel for its portrayal of unbiased news in a complex and fast-moving environment.

== Schedule ==
The channel broadcasts live from studio 54D in the Peel Wing of BBC Broadcasting House, London, for just over seven hours every day (13:30-20:35 GMT, 17:00-00:05 Tehran time). The studio is HD and uses some automated gallery technology. Since late 2020, BBC Newsnight shares the same studio.

Repeats of news and entertainment programmes, plus visualised radio bulletins, fill the remaining 17 hours.

Programmes cover a variety of genres including current affairs, documentaries, light entertainment, culture, science, business and the arts. Entertainment programmes such as BBC Sound, Sherlock, Glastonbury Festival and Top Gear are broadcast with Persian dubbing.

== Presenters and correspondents ==
=== Presenters ===
Jamaluddin Mousavi

Jamaluddin (Jamal) started working for the BBC in 2001 as a journalist when he joined the BBC's Central Asia magazine in Iran and Afghanistan. Before joining the BBC, Jamal was the editor of a weekly publication for Afghan refugees living in Mashhad, the province capital of Iran's Khorasan province where he also managed a UNHCR project to train young Afghan journalists. Jamal comes from Afghanistan although he grew up and studied in Iran. Jamal is the lead presenter of the flagship 60 Minutes programme.

Majid Afshar

Majid Afshar is a news anchor for BBC Persian, where he presents news bulletins, the 60 Minutes programme, and occasionally appears on Page 2. Prior to joining the BBC World Service in 2014, Afshar worked for BBC Monitoring, Sky News, and other English-language broadcasting networks. In addition to his broadcasting roles, he provides simultaneous translation between English and Persian for the BBC.

Najieh Gholami

Najieh began her broadcasting career in 2001 as a reporter for the BBC Persian service in Mashhad: the capital of Khorasan province in northeast Iran. She was the first Persian-speaking journalist to be accredited by the Iranian government to work for the BBC in Iran.

Parizad Nobakht

Parizad Nobakht frequently presents the 10 o'clock and 11 o'clock news.

Farnaz Ghazizadeh

Farnaz Ghazizadeh has worked for some of Iran's most respected newspapers, including Neshat, Yas-e Nou and the weekly Zan (Woman). She began her broadcast career in 2000 as the presenter of a daily science programme for Iranian television. In December 2003 Farnaz emigrated to the Netherlands with her family, where she joined several other Iranian journalists to start the news website Roozonline. She joined BBC Persian in 2005 as a radio correspondent. She now presents Page 2, a twice-weekly politics discussion programme.

Baran Abbasi

Baran Abbasi is a presenter and reporter. She joined BBC Persian in 2014 and started presenting in 2017.

Kasra Naji

Previously a correspondent for the channel, Naji now presents news bulletins.

=== Correspondents ===
Nafiseh Kohnavard

A reporter who covers conflict and political news from Turkey to Iraq especially the ISIS atrocities in Sinjar and other locations.

Behrang Tajdin

Behrang covers technology and UK political stories for the Channel.

Jiyar Gol

Former Turkey correspondent

Pooria Jafereh

Sports correspondent

Khashayar Joneidi

Washington correspondent, former Istanbul correspondent

Bahman Kalbasi

United States/UN correspondent

=== Previous presenters ===
- Fardad Farahzad is a former news presenter and reporter with the BBC Persian TV. He has anchored and covered many major Iranian and international stories for the network, including Iran's Nuclear Program, Arab Spring, 2012 US Presidential Election, Brussels bombings and 2016 Nice attack.
- Nader Soltanpour (in Persian نادر سلطانپور) is an Iranian-Canadian journalist and a former television news presenter with the BBC World-Persian service. He studied finance in Montreal, Canada and for 10 years worked in banks and investment firms in Toronto, Canada. In 1997, while still working in finance, Soltanpour began his journalism career as a producer and presenter of a weekly radio programme called Persian Voice (in Persian رادیو صدای‌ پارسی) for the Iranian and Afghan communities in Toronto, Canada. In 2000, Nader left finance and turned Persian Voice into Canada's first nightly Persian language radio programme. In 2005, he joined the Canadian Broadcasting Corporation as a copy writer and producer for The World Report, Canada's most-listened-to morning news programme. Nader joined BBC Persian television in July 2008.
- Negin Shiraghaei is an Iranian activist and a former news presenter for the BBC Persian TV. She has been a lead presenter for the coverage of main news stories such as the death of the former Iranian president Akbar Hashemi Rafsanjani. The Iranian government has targeted her family members in Iran and she appealed to the UN Human Rights Council.

== Programmes ==
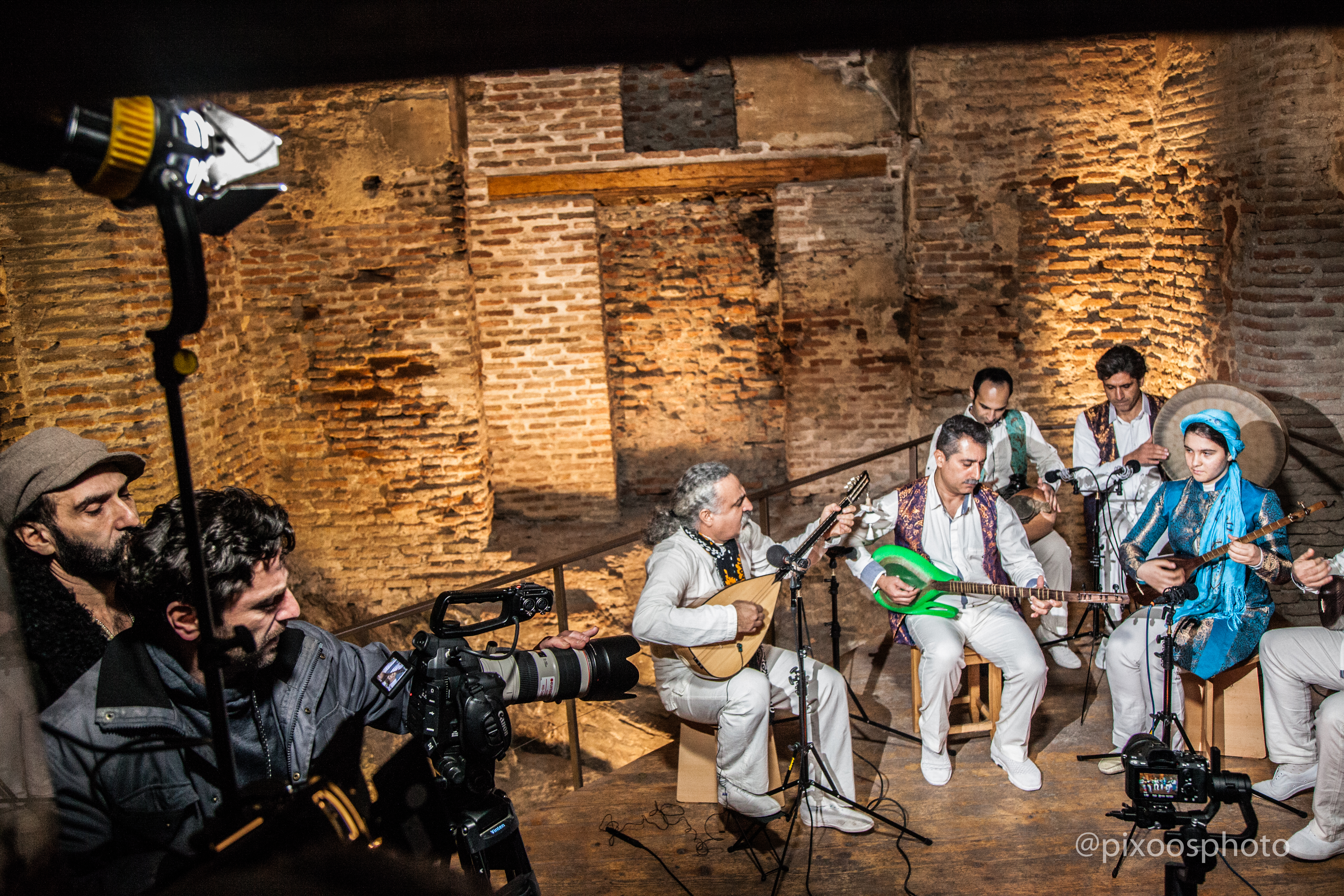
Behzad Bolour directing and presenting a Yaldā Night show (Persian Yuletide) in Atashgah of Tbilisi.

- KOOK (TV series)
- Persian Click (TV series)
- Purple Crystal with Behzad Bolour (Tv series)
