= BBC Radio Theatre =

Theatre at BBC Broadcasting House in London

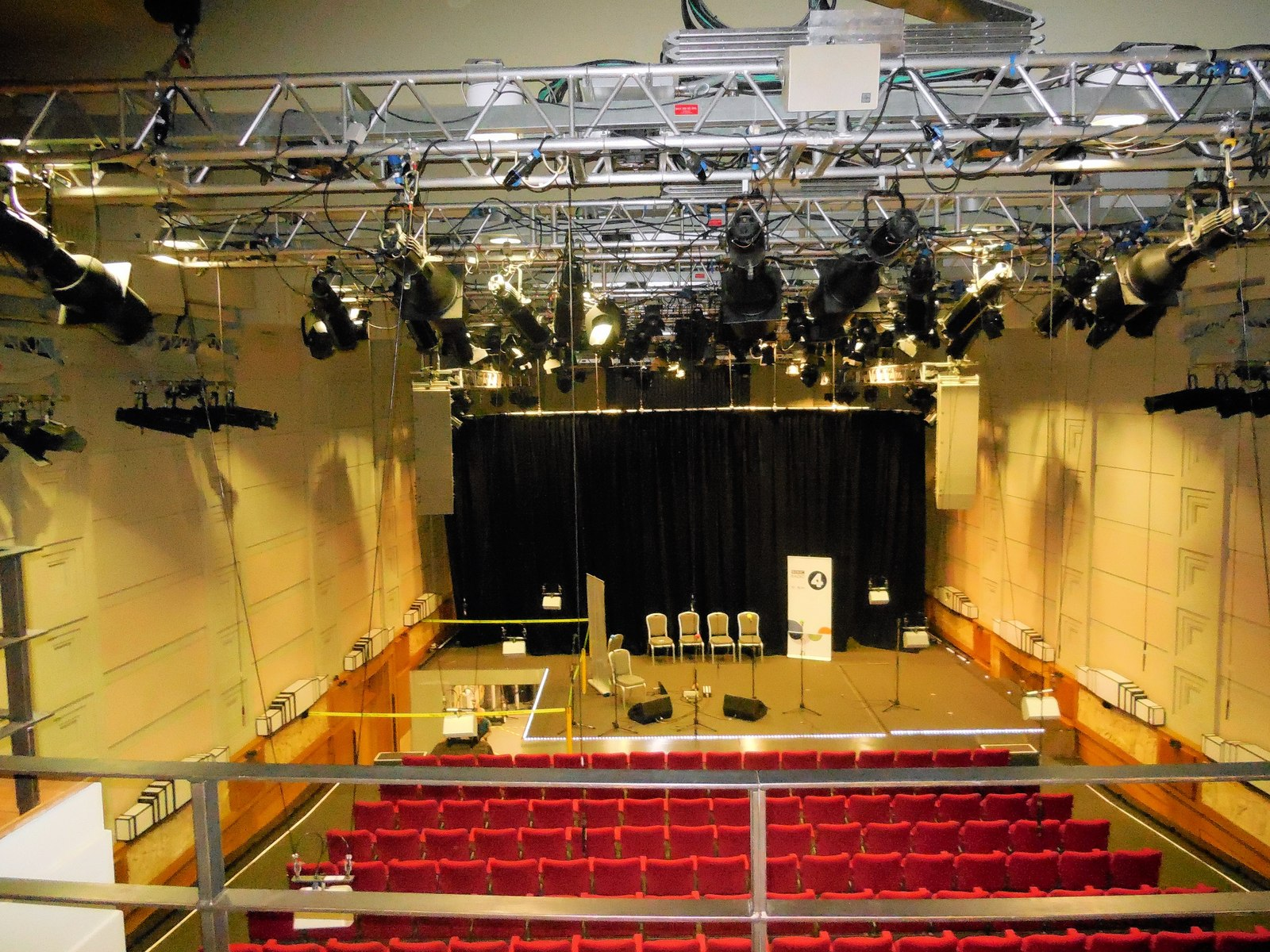
- The theatre's stage viewed from the balcony
- Interactive map of BBC Radio Theatre
- Former names: The Concert Hall
- Address: Broadcasting House, Portland Place
- Location: London
- Coordinates: 51°31′6″N 0°8′37″W
- Operator: British Broadcasting Corporation
- Capacity: 550

Construction
- Groundbreaking: 1929
- Architect: George Val Myer

The BBC Radio Theatre (originally named The Concert Hall) is a theatre situated within the BBC's Broadcasting House complex. It is used for live broadcast and audio recordings.

== History ==
Originally named The Concert Hall, the theatre was designed by George Val Myer as part of the BBC's new Broadcasting House building. The hall is 106 feet (32 m) long, and tapers from 48 feet (15 m) wide at the rear to 36 feet (11 m) wide behind the stage. The room's height is 31 feet (9.4 m), taking up three storeys of Broadcasting House. Upon original specification, the hall had a reverberation time of 1.7 seconds.

Broadcasting House was opened on 14 May 1932 by Queen Mary. The theatre's first performance was held on 15 October 1932; at this time the hall's capacity allowed a large orchestra and an audience of 550. On 10 March 1933, the hall hosted a memorial concert to the BBC's former Director of Music, Percy Pitt.

In 1933, the BBC Yearbook described the hall's acoustics and architecture:

In the design of public concert halls a difficulty frequently encountered is the variability of the reverberation time according to the size of the audience, owing to the sound-absorbing properties of the latter [...] This difficulty has to a very large extent been avoided by providing heavily upholstered seats for the audience and by carpeting the space occupied by the orchestra. The upholstery and carpets provide sufficient sound absorption in themselves, and conditions are not greatly altered when the upholstered seats are occupied.

Val Myer's interior included extensive Art Deco fittings, an oak dado and bas-reliefs by Gilbert Bayes. The theatre's green room was designed by Raymond McGrath.

Upon the outbreak of the Second World War, part of the theatre was used as a dormitory. On 6 September 1939, Stuart Hibberd wrote that:

Wakened by sirens at 6.50 a.m. in Broadcasting House, I scrambled into some clothes and went to the concert hall now being used as the main shelter for those on duty. One end of it had been converted into a dormitory, in which twenty or thirty people were asleep. The other was filled with people sitting and standing around in groups, dressed in all sorts of garment: girls in dressing-gowns of various hues, some thirty or more charladies, some with their mops and buckets, and engineers and programme staff on duty, like myself. We sat there for two hours before the 'All Clear' went; then there was a stampede to the canteen for breakfast, and of course nothing was ready.

In 1966, the BBC commissioned a report into sound propagation between spaces inside Broadcasting House, entitled Acoustic Tests in Broadcasting House, London: The Anomalous Sound Transmission between Studio S2 and the Concert Hall. The investigation found that Studio S2—situated in the sub basement below the Concert Hall and used for small orchestras and pop groups—leaked sound into the auditorium above due to inadequate sound insulation and lack of a floating floor; this occasionally distracted musicians in the Concert Hall although it could not be heard on transmissions or recordings.

In 1994, the Concert Hall was renamed the Radio Theatre.

In 2012, a developmental Super Hi-Vision (8K) video system with 22.2 surround sound audio was installed in the theatre to show the London Olympics and its opening ceremony.

=== Organ ===
On 16 June 1933, the BBC unveiled the Concert Hall's Compton organ, the first of the BBC Theatre Organs. To celebrate the event, the corporation broadcast a concert featuring George Thalben-Ball, G. D. Cunningham, and Walter Alcock. The organ featured 2,826 pipes in 35 ranks.

== Productions ==
The BBC has recorded a number of comedy programmes in the theatre, including What's My Line?, Just a Minute, and I'm Sorry I Haven't a Clue. and Dick Barton - Special Agent.

Musical artists to have performed in the venue include David Bowie (for his Bowie at the Beeb album). The Radio 2 In Concert series is broadcast from the theatre; contributing artists include Stereophonics, Jeff Lynne's ELO, James Morrison, Emeli Sande, Ed Sheeran, and Paul Weller.
