= Behzad Bolour =

Television producer

- بهزاد بلور
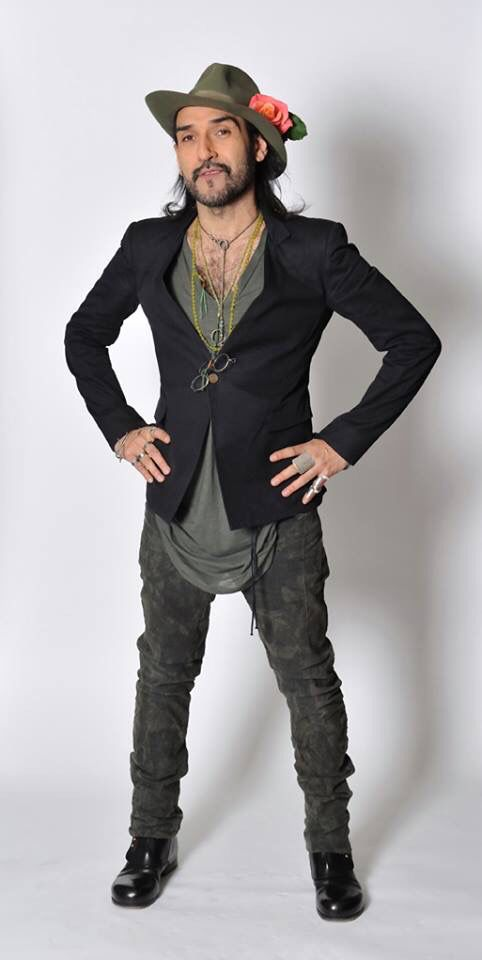
- Behzad Bolour on BBC Persian studio, London
- Born: Behzad Bolurfrushan; 23 March 1965 (age 61); Tehran, Iran
- Citizenship: British
- Occupations: TV & Radio Personality, producer, director, Humanitarian, musician, artist, Fashion Designer
- Years active: 1983–present
- Organization: BBC
- Known for: Bolour-e Banafsh, Tarikh-e Booseh, and role in Asoodegi-ha-ye Khalegh
- Notable work: Bolour-e Banafsh (lit. 'Purple Crystal')
- Style: traditional
- Television: Bolour-e Banafsh ('Purple Crystal'), Tarikh-e Booseh, KOOK, Noon-o Namak (lit. 'Bread and Salt'), Rooz-e Haftom (lit. 'Seventh Day') and performance and production in BBC Persian
- Awards: Third Award of the World Academy of Arts, Literature and Media and numerous other awards

Behzad Bolour or Behzad Bolurforushan (born 23 March 1965) is one of the senior editors and producers of BBC Persian since 1990, and the producer and director of the program Bolour-e Banafsh. Behzad is a member of the old family of Bolurforushan in Tehran. His background his mother's side goes back to Abbas Mirza Qajar, and by his father to the importer of the Nickel silver and Crystal Factory of Iran, Mohammad-Hassan Bolurforushan.

== Life and activities ==
At 15, he won the National Award for Fine Arts in Iranian High Schools and studied Iranian traditional music. Behzad left Iran in 1983 (he says on his Instagram page that he ran away) and turned to fashion design, interior design, and murals, and recorded a traditional Persian album, which in 1990 paved the way for him in producing music and youth programs, performing, and producing BBC Persian Radio opened and then prepared the entertainment magazine "Rooze Haftom".

His "Boose Tarikh" program, or "Kiss History", has been nominated for numerous awards for BBC World Service, as well as his other programs. He has appeared in a series of animated films in the role of a stallion and has directed the BBC zigzag illustrated story project.

He launched the BBC Persian entertainment website, hosted live broadcasts of Iranian concerts in Europe and Dubai, and has supported Iranian underground culture and music since its inception in the 1990s. He has also organized various cultural events in Britain and Central Asia. Behzad has also trained young journalists in Afghanistan and Iran since 2000.

He said in the "ChaharShanbe Ba Sina" TV program that he placed particular emphasis on not using non-Persian words in Persian, as well as his accompanying decorations from Greece and Sudan, the variety of his hats and his use of flowers on the hat, and the reason for using the hat.

On 21 March 2009, he presented a combination of Nowruz and music on the occasion of the Iranian New Year on Public Radio International in the United States.

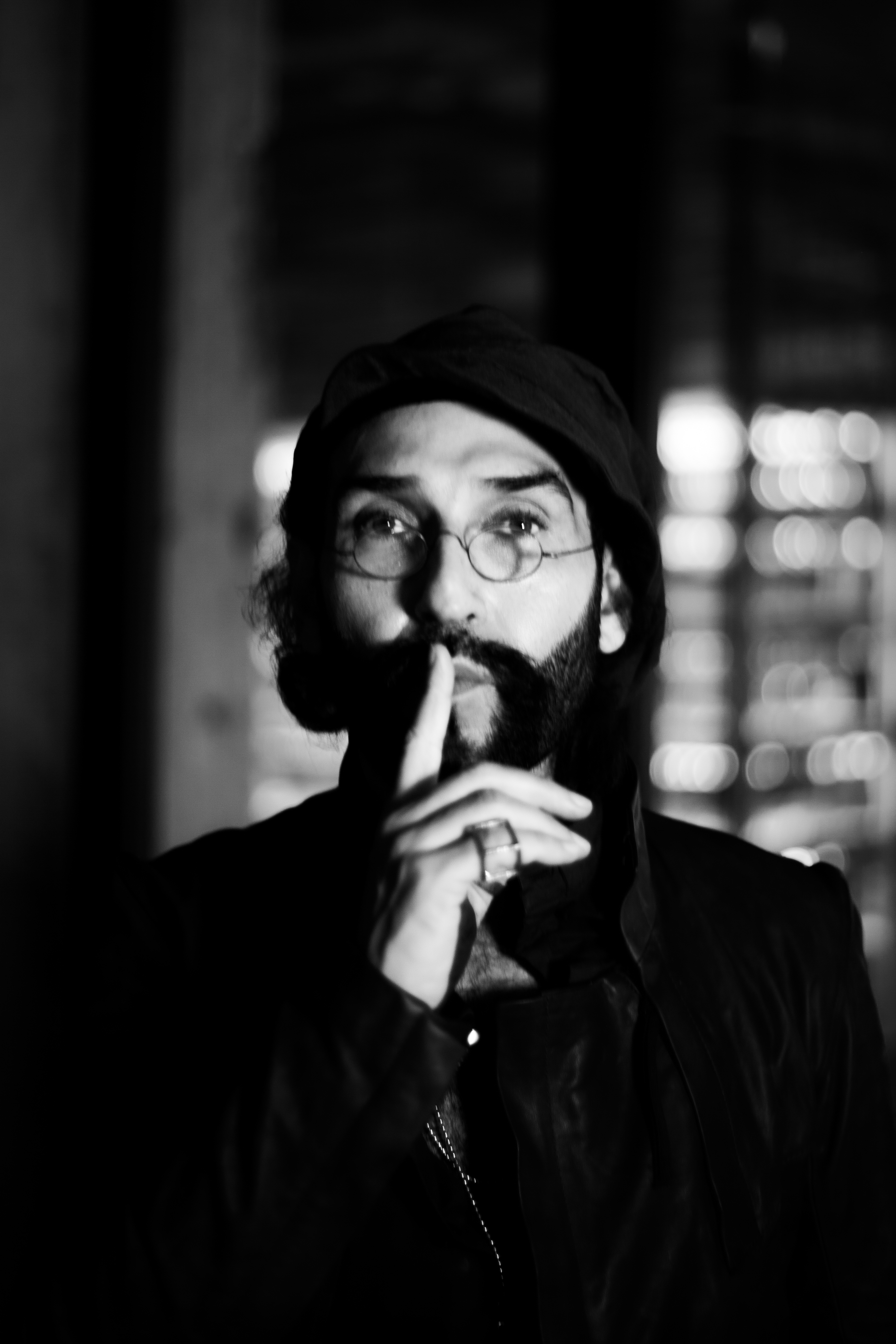
Behzad Bolour

== Ancestors ==
Behzad's maternal grandfather was Mr. Gholam Hossein Behbahani, the merchant of Shiraz. During the Qajar period, he was one of the great merchants of Shiraz and during the reign of Reza Shah, he was the representative of Shiraz in the National Assembly.

== Race ==
According to Ancestry.com his DNA race includes Irani, Turk and Caucas.

== In the Iranian Revolution of 1978 ==
Behzad Bolour wrote in an article for BBC Persian that during the Iranian Revolution of 1978, several Uzi and Kalashnikov machine guns were entrusted to Behzad's family by a commander who was his family, and we used these weapons to shoot in the air. The first army of the Revolutionary Guards were the fathers of the family, and the family of Bolurfrushan was among them. He goes on to say that sometime later, the weapons were taken back and the Revolutionary Guards Corps was recognized.

== Music ==
Behzad Bolour in 1980, learned the setar instrument from Jalal Zolfonun and then turned to playing the tanbur and komuz. He says that Iranian music had disappeared so much that he learned to play the tambourine out of interest and by listening to ballads and inspiration from the ancient and traditional culture of Iran. In 1983, he formed several music groups in London and released the album Mish by Touch International company.

== Seventh Day ==
Behzad Bolour joined BBC Persian in 1992 with the encouragement of Baqer Moin, the then-head of the BBC Persian section. By entering the Persian section, Behzad Bolour brought the culture of Iran Youth Day to the programs of this radio for Iran and Afghanistan. He began his career on the Seventh Day program with the "Wonders and Westerns" song program and later produced and performed the entire program.

== Work in Afghanistan ==
Behzad Bolour went to Afghanistan a few days after the fall of the Taliban regime and was one of the first journalists to work in that country. Behzad Bolour was able to increase the thirst of Afghan society for the fall of the Taliban regime.

== Seventh Night and Underground Music ==
Believing in a culture of transparency and fairness, Behzad Bolour started a political program from the British government budget for Iranian teenagers and young people, in which they contacted the program lives under the pretext of playing their songs and said whatever they wanted to the atmosphere of the program. After a while, with the encouragement of Behzad, many young artists, using the basic facilities of sound recording and transmission via the Internet, began to send their songs to the BBC. Many of the most famous singers of these days, including Hossein Eblis, Hossein Tohi, Amir Tataloo, DJ Maryam, Pani, Khak, Sara Naeini, Mohsen Namjoo, Kiosk, Oham group, Brooks, Shahkar Bineshpajooh and many others were interviewed by him for the first time.

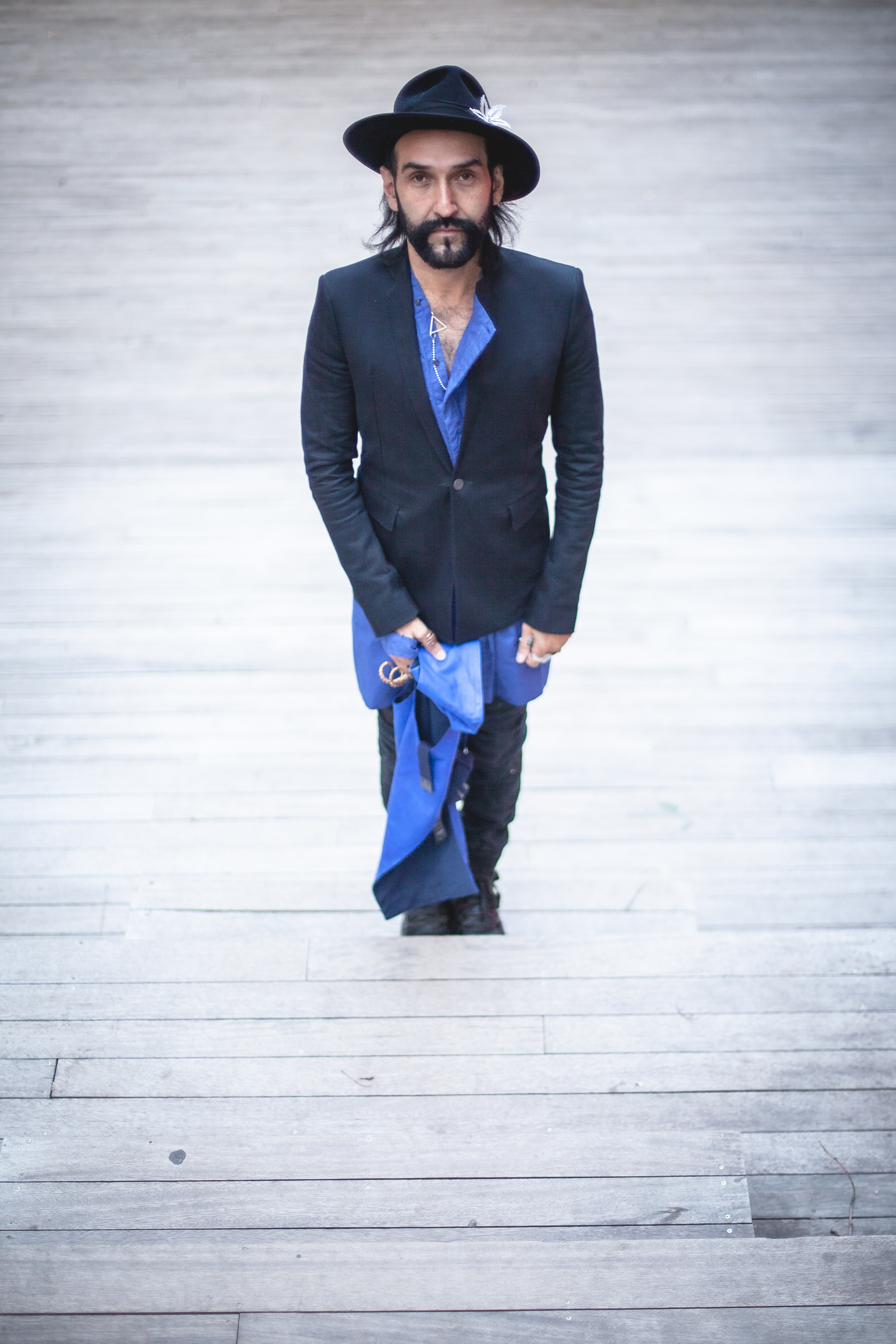
Behzad Bolour

== Bolour-e Banafsh (Purple Crystal) ==
Regarding the choice of the name of the Bolour-e Banafsh program, he said that although he was not interested in purple, it was intended to be named after the new term "purple scream" by Houshang Irani, who disagreed over the word "Crystal Scream". In different series, he examines Iranian and Middle Eastern music, art, and culture as immigrants in different parts of the world, including the documentary Tajikistan and Rudaki, a series of Iranian music series in the United States, Iranian Immigrants in Georgia, and special programs such as Yalda night in Tajikistan.

== Teaching ==
In 2000, he traveled with a BBC team to Peshawar in northern Pakistan, where he trained several groups of local radio programmers to produce political programs for Afghan children from the UK Government. As part of a political plan, the BBC World Service trained citizen journalists who later worked for the BBC Persian. Among his students are Farn Taghizadeh, Ali Hamedani, Nima Akbarpour, and many others.

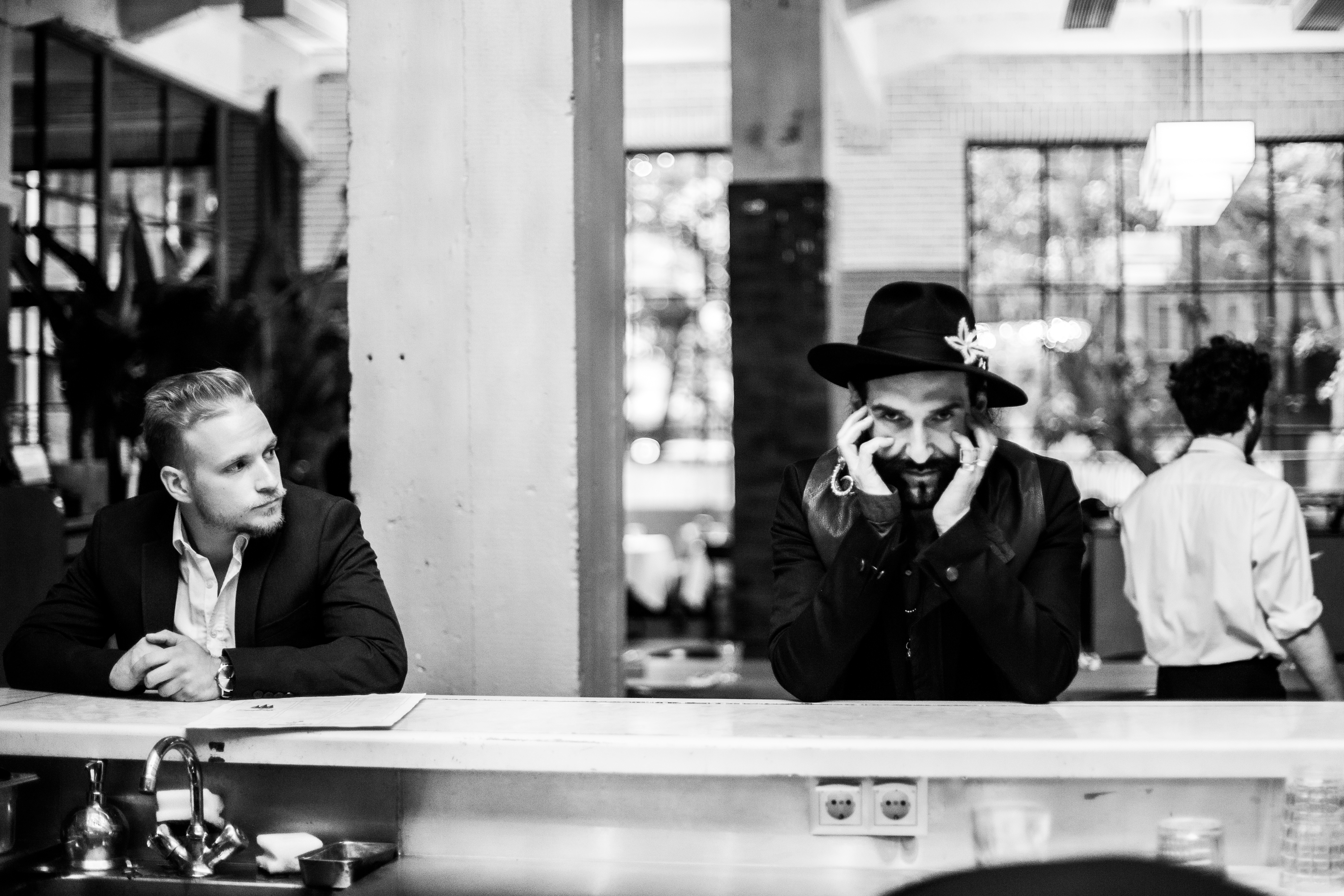
Behzad Bolour

== Awards ==
- National Award for Fine Arts of Iranian High Schools at the age of 15
- Winner of the third prize of the World Academy of Arts, Literature, and Media
