= Farnaz =

Farnaz (Persian: فرناز, lit. 'splendid beauty, glorious beauty') is a Persian feminine given name.

Notable people with the name Farnaz include:

- Farnaz Shetty, Indian television actress
- Farnaz Fassihi, Iranian-American journalist for The Wall Street Journal
- Farnaz Ghazizadeh (born 1974), Iranian journalist, blogger, and BBC Persian television presenter
