= KOOK (TV series) =

BBC Persian television series

KOOK (Persian: کوک, lit. 'tuning, tune') is BBC Persian TV's weekly music magazine programme. The show features both established and un-discovered music acts from Iran, Afghanistan and Tajikistan. Kook recently made a series of programmes from the 2009 Eurovision Song Contest in Moscow. The programme has featured interviews and performances from artists such as Arash, Ebi, Dariush and others. Kook recently hosted a concert in Dubai.

In addition the programme has a sister programme called Close-Up which features in depth interviews and longer performances with key artists. The show's presenter is Behzad Bolour.
