= Marmaduke Tudsbery Tudsbery =

British civil engineer (1892–1983)

Marmaduke Tudsbery Tudsbery, CBE (4 October 1892 – 9 May 1983) was a British civil engineer. After beginning his career at a shipbuilders yard in Glasgow he joined the British Army during the First World War, rising to the acting rank of major. Tudsbery left the army to join the British Broadcasting Corporation in 1926. At the BBC he selected the site for Broadcasting House, which he helped to design, and the BBC Television Centre. Tudsbery was appointed Commander of the Order of the British Empire in the 1941 Birthday Honours and served as president of the Smeatonian Society of Civil Engineers from 1956 to 1957. He also travelled widely and published accounts of his journeys.

== Early life and military career ==
Marmaduke Tudsbery Tudsbery was born on 4 October 1892. He studied at Westminster School and Imperial College London before joining the staff of the Yarrow Shipbuilders yard in Glasgow. During the First World War Tudsbery served in the Royal Engineers branch of the Special Reserve; he was commissioned as a probationary second lieutenant on 24 April 1915 and confirmed in that rank on 11 August. Tudsbery served with the Forestry Directorate from 14 April to 31 May 1917 and was granted the temporary rank of lieutenant during this period. He was appointed to the acting rank of captain on 1 June 1917 and received promotion to the substantive rank of lieutenant on 1 July.

On 12 January 1919 Tudsbery was promoted to the acting rank of major; he relinquished this rank on 23 March. Tudsbery once again served in the acting rank of captain between 25 March and 17 October 1919 and between 29 December 1919 and 13 March 1920. On 11 October 1920 (by which time he was on the General List) he became assistant secretary of the War Office's Central Engineering Board and held the temporary rank of captain while so employed. He later became assistant secretary of the Royal Engineer Board and held the temporary rank of captain, until he relinquished this appointment on 1 January 1926 to join the British Broadcasting Corporation.

== Later career ==
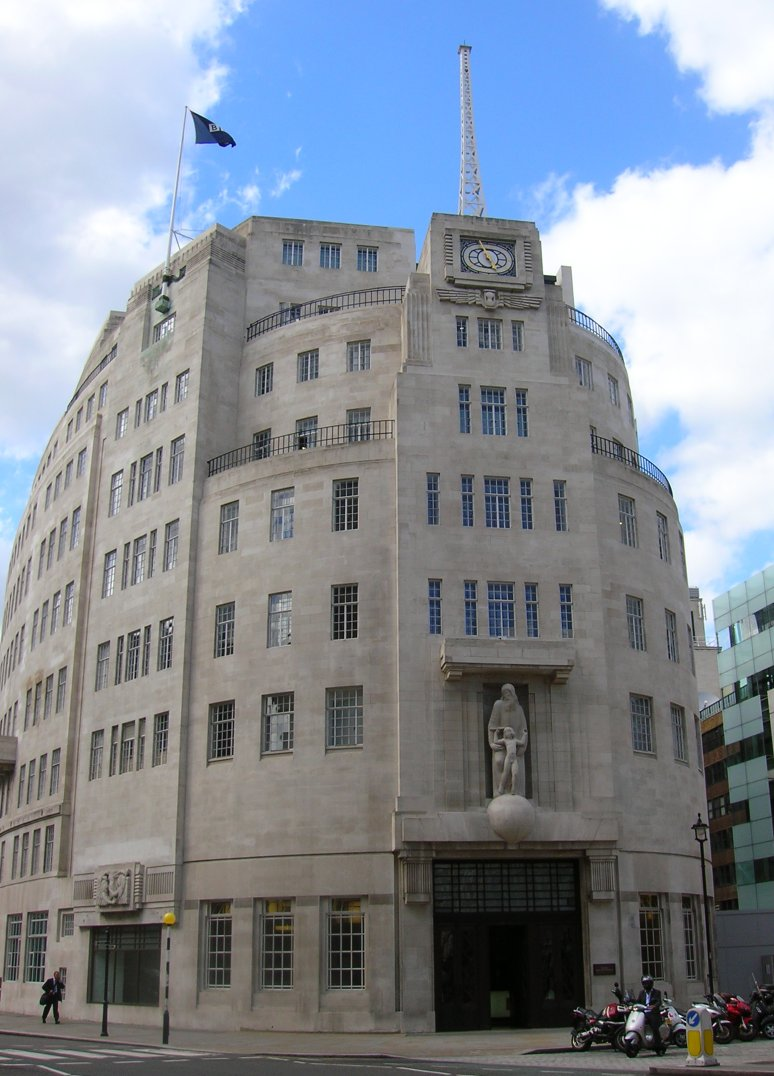
Part of the original portion of Broadcasting House, which Tudsbery helped to design

At the BBC Tudsbery was tasked with selecting the site for a new headquarters. He chose Foley House in Portland Place, central London. He worked with architect George Val Myer to design the structure, which became Broadcasting House. This was Tudsbery's most significant work for the BBC and the final building, which opened on 15 May 1932, was designed to maximise the use of the unusually-shaped site. Tudsbery worked on the adaptation of Glasgow's North Park House for the BBC's purposes; it served as the home of BBC Scotland between 1936 and 2007.

For his work at the BBC, Tudsbery was appointed Commander of the Order of the British Empire in the 1941 Birthday Honours. After the war he selected a 13 acres (5.3 ha) site in White City, London, for the construction of the BBC Television Centre. He had first visited the site in 1908 when it hosted the Franco-British Exhibition. From 1952 to 1960 he worked as an independent consulting civil engineer. In 1953 he became an honorary fellow of Imperial College London.

== Personal life ==
Tudsbery was a member of the Institution of Civil Engineers and was elected to the Smeatonian Society of Civil Engineers in 1937. He served as president of the Smeatonian Society from 1956 to 1957. By 1971, the society's bicentennial year, he was the most senior member by date of election and commissioned a gift to the society, a silver model of the Eddystone Lighthouse by Leslie Durbin, that is used as a centrepiece at dinners. Tudsbery was appointed a member emeritus in January 1981.

Tudsbery was also a member of the Athenaeum Club where he was part of "The Sofa" group that met regularly after lunch around a settee in the drawing room from the 1950s to 1970s. This group included Sir Alan Burns, Sir Hugh Dow, Sir Eric de Normann, General Sir William Platt and Bishop Henry Montgomery Campbell. Tudsbery travelled widely and had accounts of his journeys printed for his friends. In 1966 he visited the USSR and afterwards published In the Red: Two Weeks in the USSR. Tudsbery died on 9 May 1983.
