= Jamaluddin Mousavi =

Afghan TV presenter (born 1976)

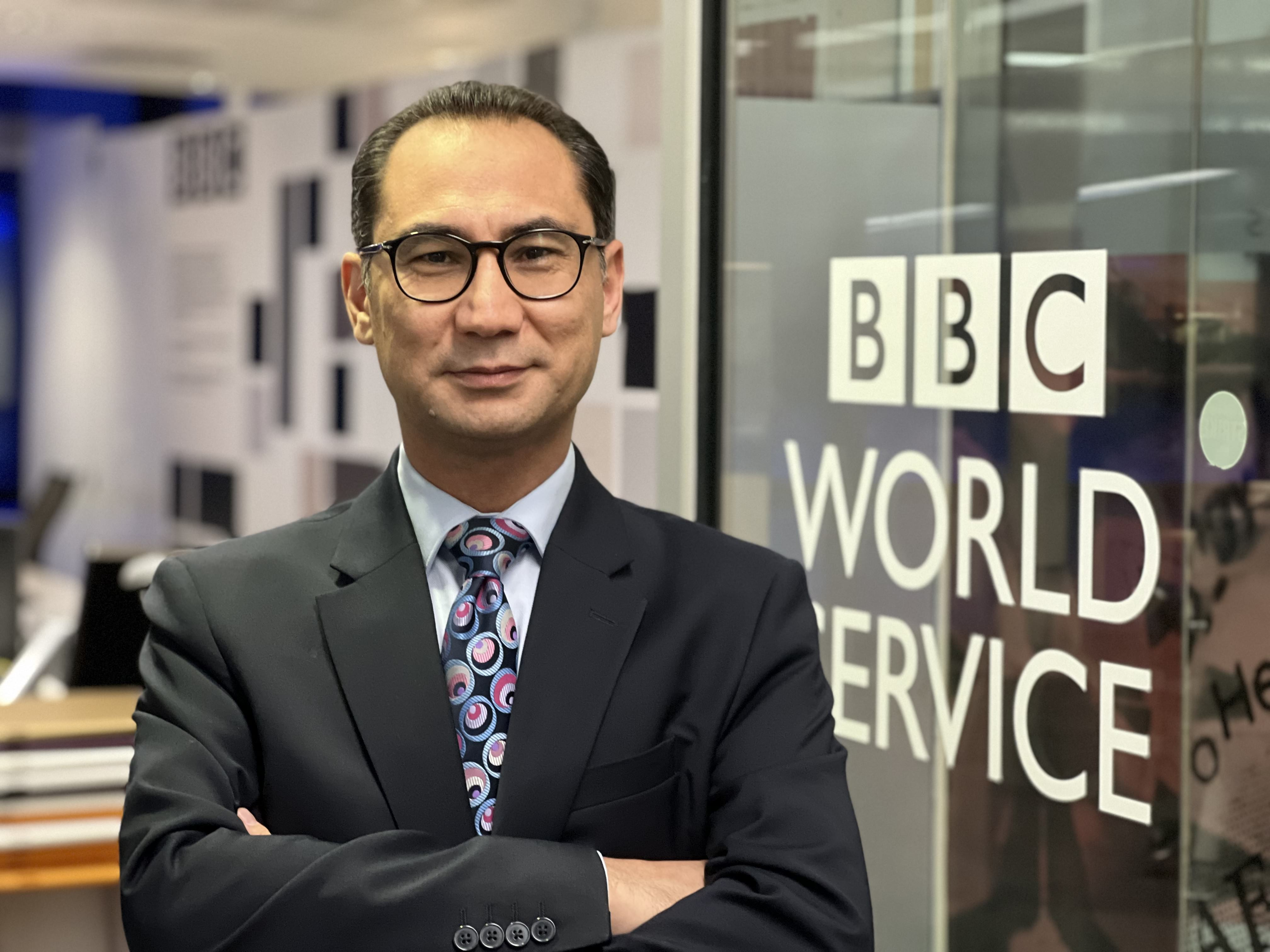
- Jamaluddin Mousavi reporting from Doha on Afghan peace process, 28 February 2019
- Citizenship: British Citizen
- Occupations: Presenter, Journalist, Radio Producer
- Employer: BBC World – BBC Persian TV
- Television: BBC Persian TV

Jamaluddin Mousavi Persian: جمال‌الدین موسوی) is an Afghan-British journalist and broadcaster who serves as a television presenter and News Editor for BBC Persian. He joined the BBC in 2001, beginning his career with the BBC’s Central Asia magazine, reporting from Iran and Afghanistan.

In 2005, Mousavi was appointed as a correspondent for the BBC Persian Service in the United Arab Emirates. He later moved to London, where he worked as a Senior Radio Producer before taking on editorial and presenting roles within BBC Persian television.

Prior to joining the BBC, Mousavi was the editor of a weekly publication serving Afghan refugees in Mashhad, the capital of Iran’s Khorasan Province. During this period, he also managed a United Nations High Commissioner for Refugees (UNHCR) project focused on training young Afghan journalists.

Born in Afghanistan, Mousavi grew up and pursued his education in Iran and the United Kingdom. He studied International Relations at Birkbeck, University of London, and later earned a master’s degree in Middle East Politics from the same institution.
