= Broadcasting House =

Headquarters and registered office of the BBC

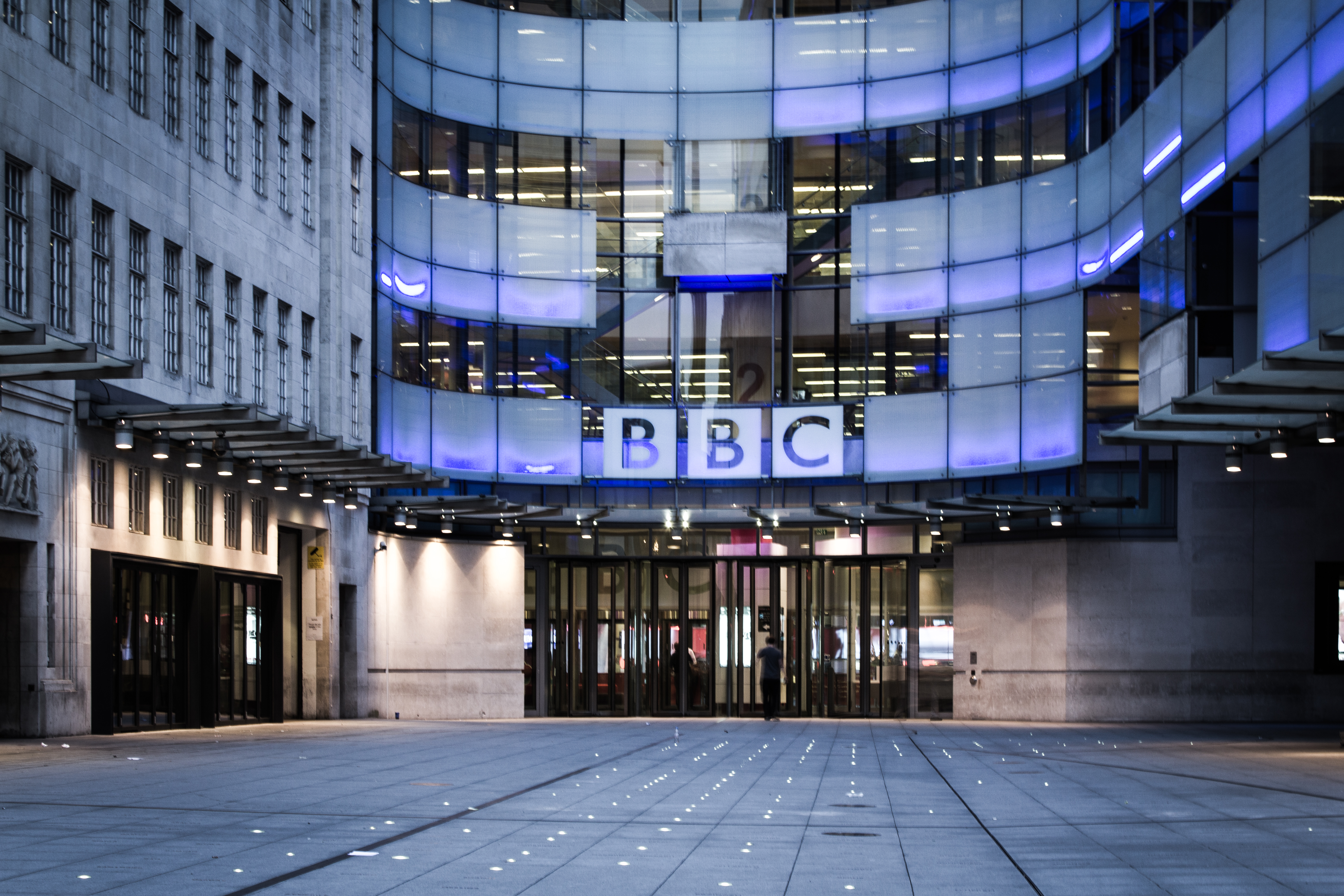
- The main entrance to Broadcasting House

- Location within Central London
- Alternative names: NBH, OBH, BH, BBC Broadcasting House

General information
- Architectural style: Art Deco
- Location: Westminster, Portland Place, London, United Kingdom
- Coordinates: 51°31′6.8″N 00°8′37.8″W
- Current tenants: BBC London; BBC Monitoring; BBC News; BBC Radio 1 BBC Radio 1Xtra; BBC Radio 2 BBC Radio 3 BBC Radio 4 BBC Radio 4 Extra; BBC Radio 6 Music; BBC World Service; BBC Television
- Construction started: 21 November 1928
- Inaugurated: 15 March 1932
- Client: British Broadcasting Corporation
- Owner: British Broadcasting Corporation

Height
- Height: 34 m (112 ft)

Technical details
- Floor count: 9 above ground, 3 below ground

Design and construction
- Architects: George Val Myer; Raymond McGrath
- Civil engineer: Marmaduke T. Tudsbery

Website
- bbc.co.uk/broadcastinghouse

Listed Building – Grade II*
- Official name: Broadcasting House
- Designated: 16 January 1981
- Reference no.: 1265570

Broadcasting House is the headquarters of the BBC, in Portland Place and Langham Place, London. The first radio broadcast from the building was made on 15 March 1932, and the building was officially opened two months later, on 15 May. The main building is in Art Deco style, with a facing of Portland stone over a steel frame. It is a Grade II* listed building and includes the BBC Radio Theatre, where music and speech programmes are recorded in front of a studio audience.

As part of a major consolidation of the BBC's property portfolio in London, Broadcasting House has been extensively renovated and extended. This involved the demolition of post-war extensions on the eastern side of the building, replaced by a new wing completed in 2005. The wing was named the "John Peel Wing" in 2012, after the disc jockey. BBC London, BBC Arabic Television and BBC Persian Television are housed in the new wing, which also contains the reception area for BBC Radio 1 and BBC Radio 1Xtra (the studios themselves are in the new extension to the main building). In February 2024, BBC Radio 2 and BBC Radio 6 Music moved their operations into the Peel Wing, opposite the BBC Radio 1 studios on the eighth floor; this was facilitated by converting office space within the building, after the BBC decided to move the radio stations out of Wogan House.

The main building was refurbished, and an extension built to the rear. The radio stations BBC Radio 3, BBC Radio 4, BBC Radio 4 Extra and the BBC World Service transferred to refurbished studios within the building. The extension links the old building with the John Peel Wing, and includes a new combined newsroom for BBC News, with studios for the BBC News channel, BBC World News and other news programming. The move of news operations from BBC Television Centre was completed in March 2013.

The official name of the building is "Broadcasting House" but the BBC, until 2024, used the term "new Broadcasting House" (with a lowercase 'n') in its publicity referring to the new extension rather than the whole building, with the original building known as "old Broadcasting House".

== Construction ==
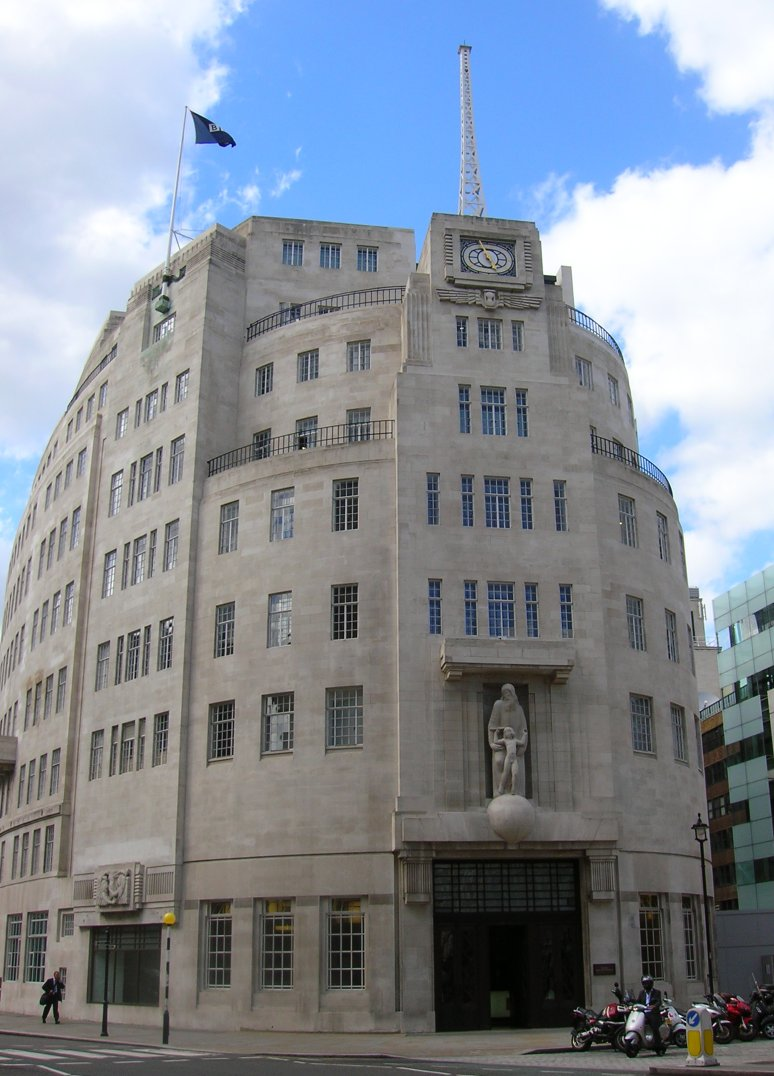
The 1928 building

Construction of Broadcasting House began in 1928, with programmes gradually transferring to the building. On 15 March 1932, the first musical programme was given by the bandleader Henry Hall and the BBC Dance Orchestra. Hall also wrote and performed, with his dance band, Radio Times, the name of the BBC's schedule publication.

The first news bulletin was read by Stuart Hibberd on 18 March. The last transmission from Savoy Hill was on 14 May, and Broadcasting House officially opened on 15 May 1932. George Val Myer designed the building in collaboration with the BBC's civil engineer, M. T. Tudsbery. The interiors were the work of Raymond McGrath, an Australian-Irish architect. He directed a team that included Serge Chermayeff and Wells Coates and designed the vaudeville studio, the associated green and dressing rooms, and the dance and chamber music studios in a flowing Art Deco style.

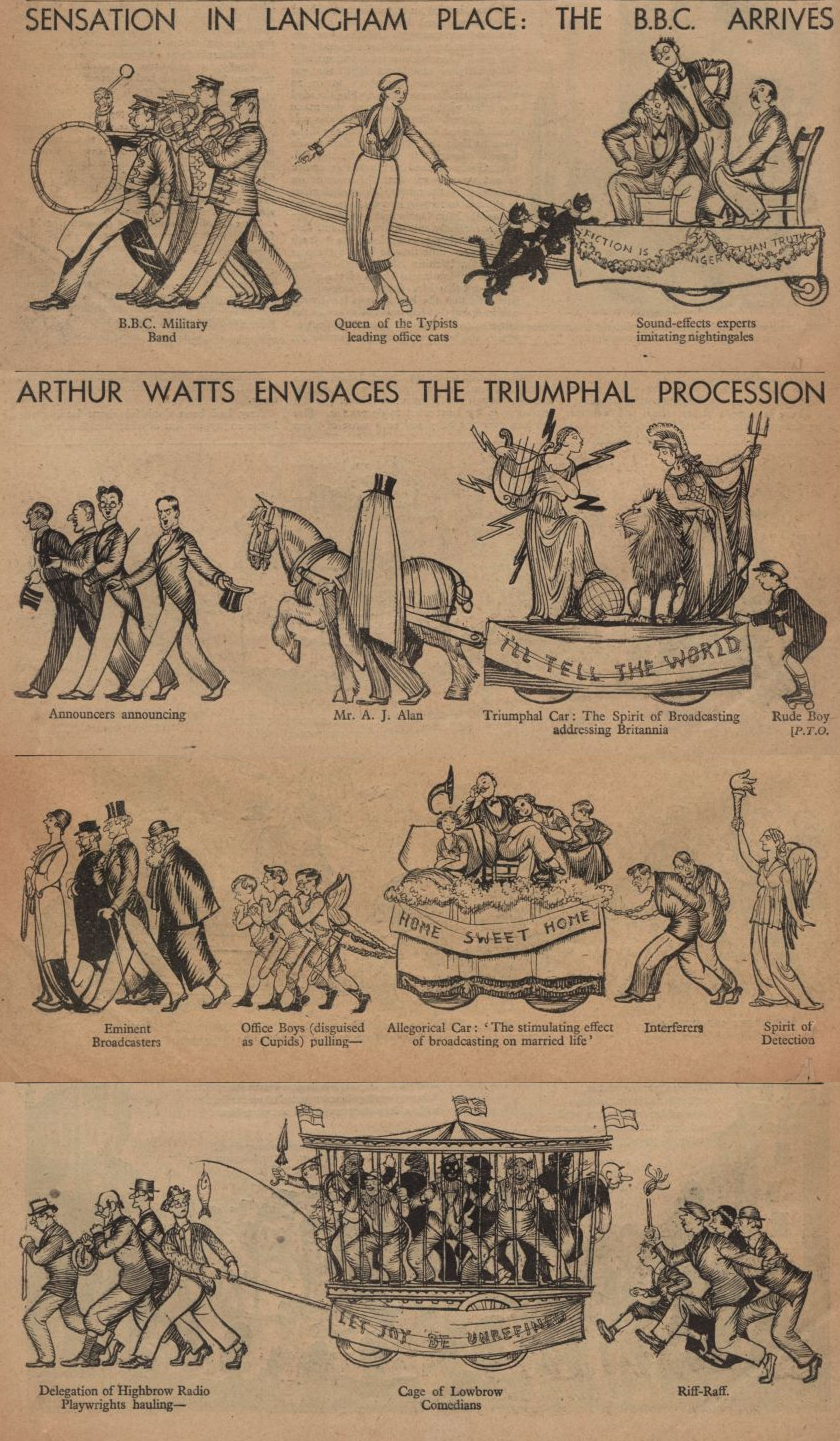
Composite of Sensation in Langham Place: The BBC Arrives, a four-part cartoon by Arthur Watts, from the 1931 Christmas edition of the Radio Times

The building is built in two parts. Dispensing with the oft-found central light-well of contemporary buildings this size, the central core containing the recording studios was a windowless structure built of brick. (Structural brick rather than steel framing was used in order to reduce noise transmission both from without and between studios.) The surrounding outer portion, designed for offices and ancillary spaces, is steel-framed and faced with Portland stone. While the outer portion had plenty of windows, the inner core required special sound-dampened ventilation systems.

There were two areas where right of ancient lights would cause height restrictions. While the rights on the southern side ceased to be a problem after the owners of those rights gave concessions, the rights on the eastern side were dealt with by sloping the roof away from the street from the fourth floor up. This not only affected the floor plan of the structure, but meant that the interior recording tower could not be built to the top floor. (Thus, one studio on the top floor was actually outside the central studio core structure.)

Underground structures, including a hundred-year-old sewer, also presented problems during construction. The building is above the Bakerloo line of the London Underground: the Victoria line was tunnelled beneath in the 1960s, and presented problems for construction of the Egton Wing (see below). Noise from passing trains is audible within the radio theatre but generally imperceptible in recordings. The ground floor was fitted with floor-to-ceiling windows overlooking the street, as the BBC believed that to finance such a project (costing £25 million in today's money), they would need to let the ground floor as a retail unit. The rapid expansion of the BBC meant this never occurred.

The original building is a Grade II* listed building.

== Renovation ==
Beginning in 2003, Broadcasting House underwent a major renovation during the BBC's W1 Programme, with the aim of refurbishing the building and combining a number of the BBC's operations in a new extension. This houses the television and radio operations of BBC News, relocated from Television Centre, and the BBC World Service, which relocated from Bush House on 12 July 2012. Many of the BBC's national radio stations are also broadcast from the building, with the exception of BBC Radio 5 Live and BBC Radio 5 Sports Extra which have moved to Salford Quays. The building work was completed in two phases. It began with the demolition of two post-war extensions to the original building.

"The redevelopment was part of a wider cost-saving strategy to consolidate the BBC's property portfolio and centralise its London operation. This will ultimately produce savings of more than £700m over the remaining 21-year life of the BBC lease on Broadcasting House."

=== First phase ===
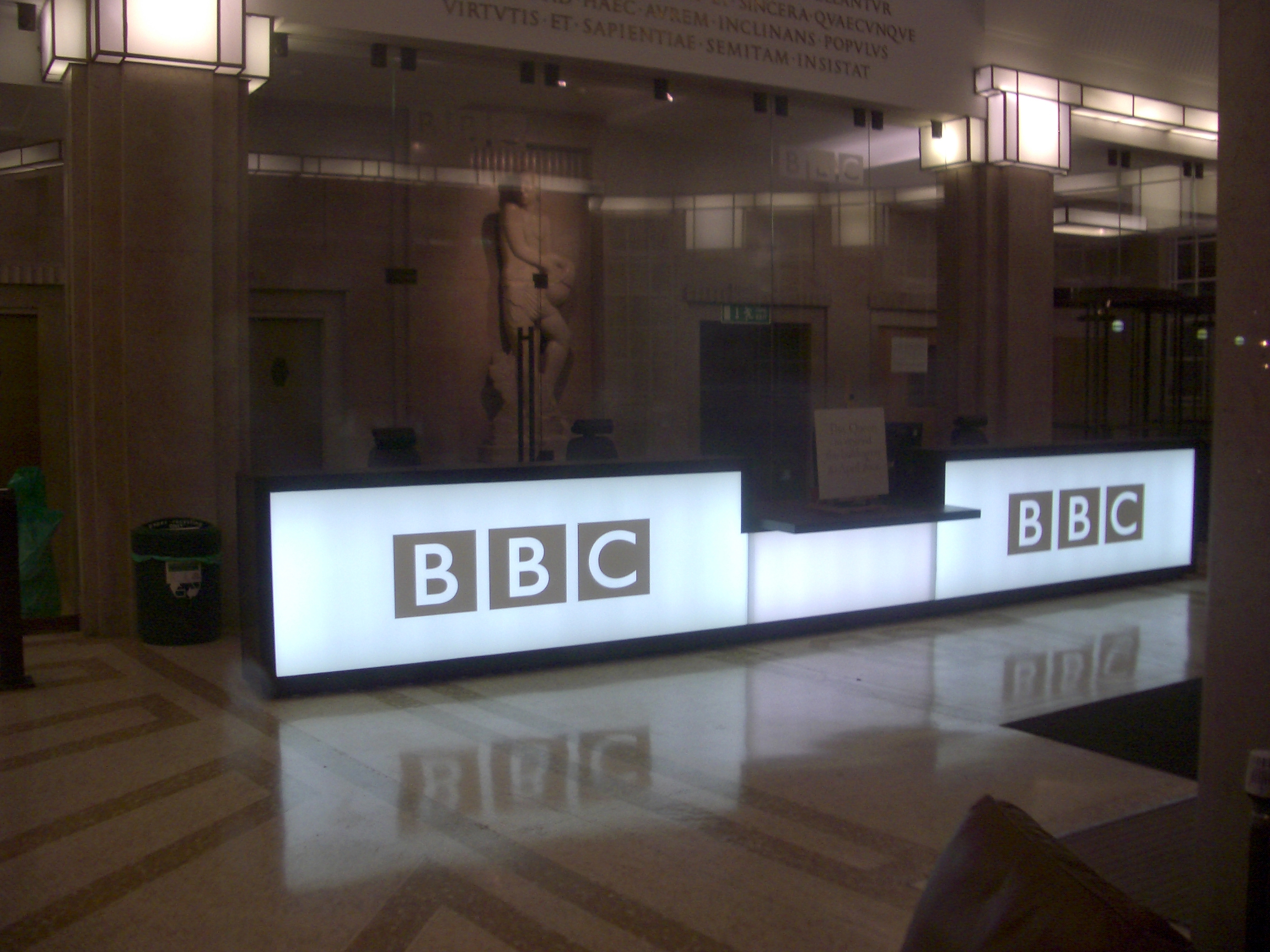
Refurbished reception in Broadcasting House

The first phase consisted of the renovation of the original building, which was starting to show its age and needed structural repair, and a new wing to the east.

In the old building, the sloped "cat slide" slate roof was removed and many of the rooms stripped back to their walls, although much of the Art Deco architecture was retained and preserved. Much of the work focused on the lower walls and ceilings, which did not include Art Deco features. The reception area was renovated to include a new desk while retaining the message and statue as an attention piece. Many rooms had ceilings removed, such as the south tower, and new reinforcement joists were added.

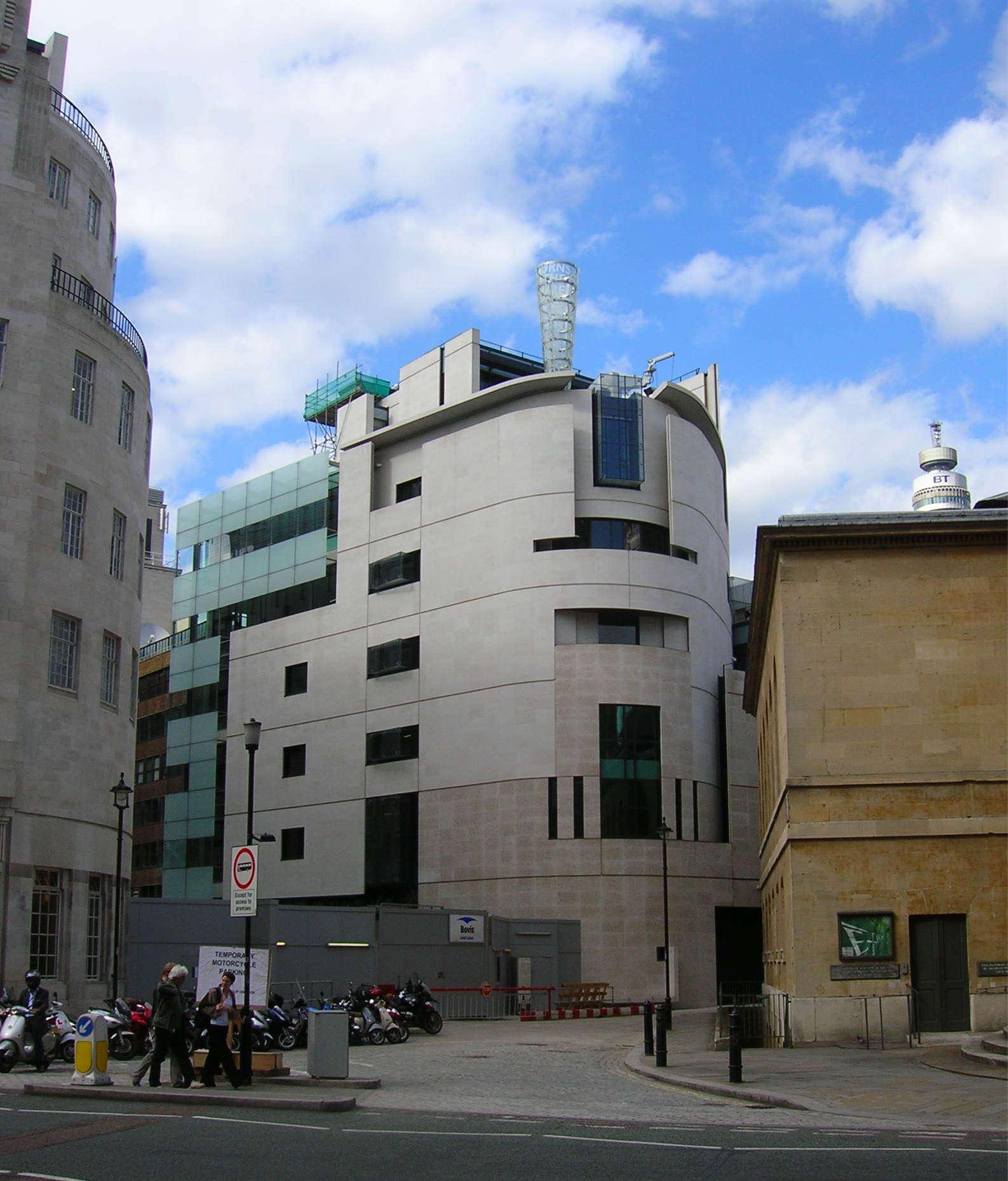
The new east wing, named after John Peel

The new Egton Wing is roughly the same shape as the main building, with a modern design and window arrangement but retaining features such as Portland stone. Towards the rear a large block was created in the side, mirroring that created in the main building when the sloping roof was removed.

The design of the extension, intended to equal the original in "architectural creativity", was carried out by MacCormac Jamieson Prichard. Construction was completed in 2005, with the refurbished Broadcasting House and new Egton wing opened by Queen Elizabeth II on 20 April 2006 as part of her 80th birthday celebrations. All areas of the Egton Wing were fully fitted out and completed by 2007.

In 2012, it was announced by the then Director-General Mark Thompson that the Egton Wing would be renamed the 'John Peel Wing' to commemorate the late Radio 1 disc jockey, whom he described as a "great radio talent". Thompson described the wing as a "fitting tribute to a man who personified so much of what the BBC stands for".

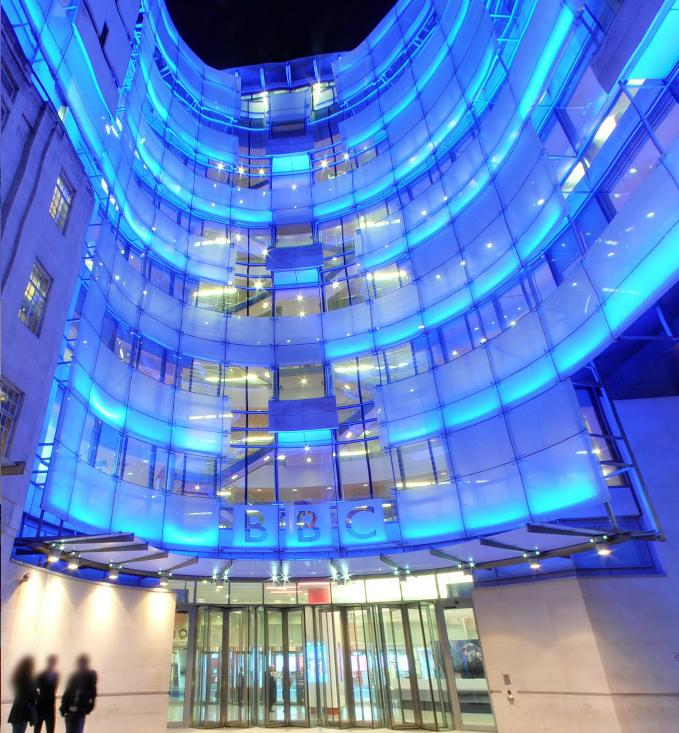
The new extension at night

It houses BBC London, BBC Arabic Television and BBC Persian Television, together with the reception area for BBC Radio 1 and BBC Radio 1Xtra.

=== Second phase ===
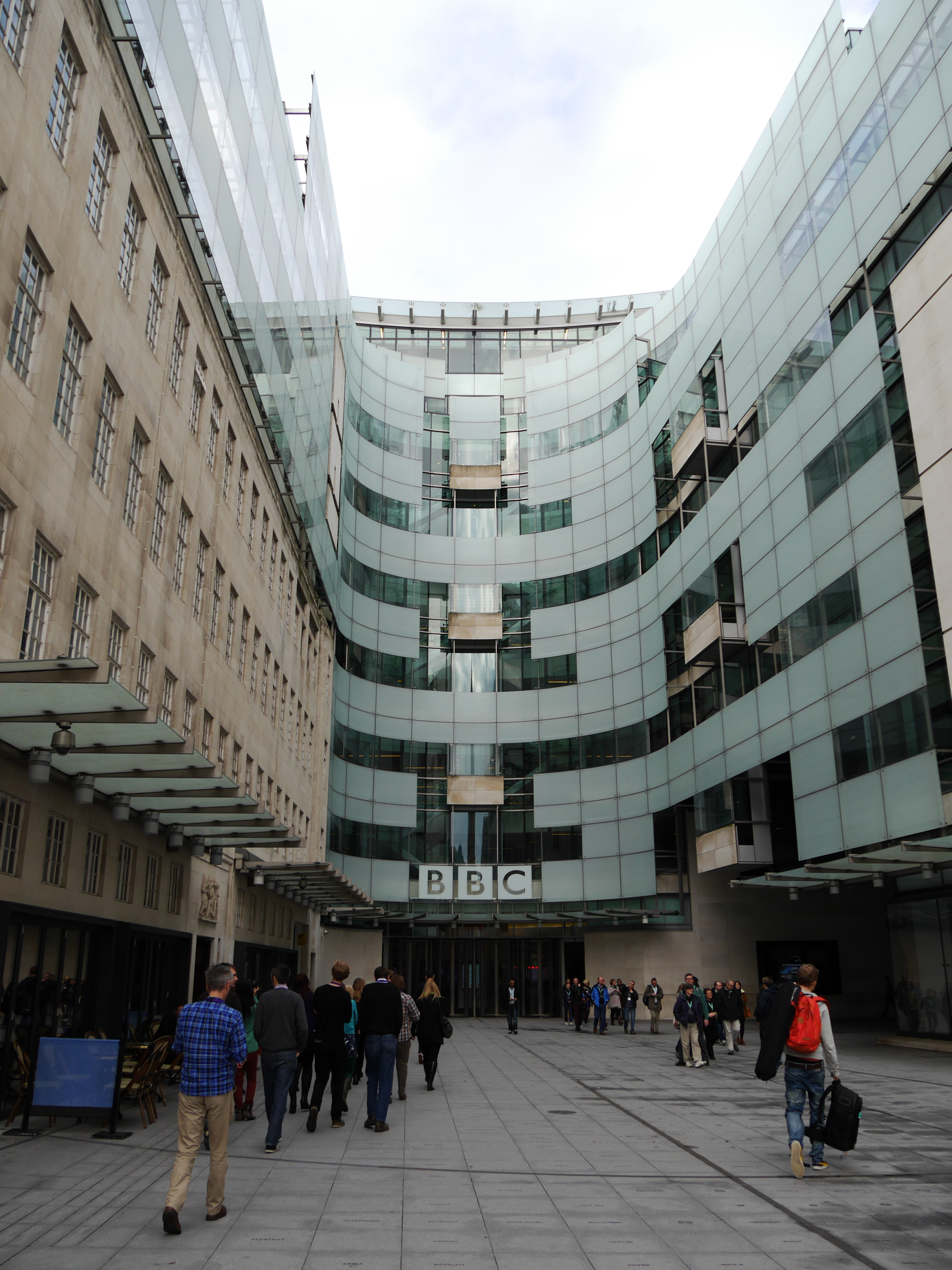
The connecting wing between old and new buildings

The second phase was the creation of the large wing to the rear of the building, joining the two buildings, and creating a plaza between them. The original architects were replaced for not agreeing to cost-related revisions, as Sir Richard MacCormac was unwilling to sacrifice the quality of his design. Construction was completed by Bovis Lend Lease in 2010, and control handed over to the BBC in 2011. While the rebuilding process was under way, many BBC radio stations moved to other buildings near Portland Place.

The extension contains the BBC News and Journalism departments, and state-of-the-art technical equipment and new studios to house the BBC News bulletins on television, the BBC News Channel and BBC World News, the BBC Arabic Television service and the BBC Persian Television service. At the heart of this is a new newsroom, the largest live newsroom in the world.

A walkway above the newsroom allows the public to view the work of journalists, connecting the foyer to the Radio Theatre and a new café for staff and the public. Complemented by the outdoor plaza, which could act as an outdoor arena and theatre, this is designed to engage the public with the television and radio making process. The extension is glass-covered in the plaza area and curved to contrast both wings either side and to continue the glass on both sides high up the building. On the Portland Place side, it continues the same use of Portland stone and glass as with the John Peel Wing.

On Monday 18 March 2013 at 1 pm, following the BBC News Channel's final broadcast from Television Centre, the first news programme from Broadcasting House was aired: the BBC News at One, on BBC One and the BBC News Channel. BBC World News was the first of BBC's news services to move into the new building on Monday 14 January 2013, beginning with GMT at noon.

Queen Elizabeth II officially opened the extension on 7 June 2013. The second phase development won the 'Programme of the Year' award at the 2013 annual awards of the Association for Project Management.

== Studios ==
=== Original ===
When built, Broadcasting House contained 22 radio studios for all programme genres, in the art-deco style with an emphasis on both looks and practicality. The practicality of the studios diminished rapidly as a result of the changing nature of broadcasting and changes in the required uses of the studios. These studios and their original intended roles were:

Number	Name	Designer	Designed use
8A	Military Band studio	Serge Chermayeff	Designed for large band and vaudeville performances.
8B	Small Debates studio	Serge Chermayeff	A small informally designed studio to encourage lively and confident debate.
7A	Production studio	Wells Coates	Acoustically dead studio, used for one section of a drama.
7B	Production studio	Wells Coates	Used for speech in a play, drama, and piano performances.
7C	Production studio	Wells Coates	Acoustically dead small drama studio.
7D	Effects studio	Wells Coates	Small effects studio for producing foley.
7E	Gramophone Effects studio	Wells Coates	Small studio for producing effects from or involving gramophones.
6A	Production studio	Wells Coates	Double height, large production studio for drama productions.
6B	Production studio	Wells Coates	Small drama studio.
6C	Production studio	Wells Coates	Acoustically dead small drama studio.
6D	Effects studio	Wells Coates	Main effects studio for the production of foley, with different floor coverings and coverings on the main table to achieve different effects, containing items including a wind machine and a water tank.
6E	Gramophone Effects studio	Wells Coates	Small studio for producing effects from or involving gramophones.
4A	News studio	Wells Coates	Acoustically dead small studio for reading news bulletins. Contained gramophone records to be played in the event of an interruption.
4B	News studio	Wells Coates	Acoustically dead small news studio with turntables.
3A	Production studio	Serge Chermayeff	A double-height large studio used for Children's Hour, chamber music recitals and the BBC Dance Orchestra.
3B	Talks studio	Serge Chermayeff	A small talks studio for unrehearsed debates.
3C	Talks studio	Serge Chermayeff	An acoustically dead small talks studio for unrehearsed debates.
3D	Library Talks studio	Dorothy Warren Trotter	A small talks studio for speeches and debates. It was decorated in the style of a personal library or study for the benefit of elderly or lordly speakers.
3E	Religious studio	Edward Maufe	A double-height large studio with a balcony, designed for religious broadcasts with a focus on all religions so that any religious member would feel comfortable. It was soon disused as listeners preferred the sound of a real church and congregation.
	The concert hall	Val Myer	A very large double-height concert hall for orchestras playing classical music. It contains a large space for the orchestra, a large section and a balcony for seating, and the first organ suitable for broadcasting. It was renamed the Radio Theatre in 1994.
BA	Vaudeville studio	Raymond McGrath	A double-height studio with balcony for theatre and variety performances, with an audience of 60.
BB	Dance band studio	Raymond McGrath	A double-height studio with a small balcony for an audience for the BBC Dance Orchestra. It was taken over for experimental television broadcasts on 22 August 1932.

=== Current ===
Following the rebuild and refurbishment, several studios have been added and the studio structure changed dramatically. The current studios are:

==== Radio studios ====
Studio	User(s)	Programmes	Room(s)
30A	BBC Radio 3		
30B	BBC Radio 3		
30C	BBC Radio 3		
30D	BBC Radio 3		
40A	BBC Radio 4	Long Wave continuity studio, Yesterday in Parliament, the Daily Service, Test Match Special and the Shipping Forecast.	
40B	BBC Radio 4	Continuity studio for BBC Radio 4	
40E	BBC World Service	Focus on Africa	
40F	BBC World Service	Focus on Africa	
50B	BBC Radio 4	The Media Show, Woman's Hour, Front Row	Visual Radio Studio
51A	BBC Radio 5 Live	Used for Radio 5 shows relay to Salford	Visual Radio Studio
52A	BBC World Service	Programme productions for BBC languages programme	
52B	BBC World Service	Programme productions for BBC languages programme	
52C	BBC World Service	Programme productions for BBC languages programme	
52D	BBC World Service	Programme productions for BBC languages programme	
60A	BBC Radio 3, BBC Radio 4, BBC Radio 4 Extra, BBC World Service	Radio drama	
62A	BBC World Service	Programme productions for BBC languages programme	
82Mills	BBC Radio 1, BBC Radio 1Xtra & BBC Asian Network	The Radio 1 Breakfast Show, Scott Mills, Annie Mac also used for mixing live performances – adjacent to the Live Lounge	
82B	BBC Radio 1, BBC Radio 1Xtra & BBC Asian Network		
82C	BBC Radio 1, BBC Radio 1Xtra & BBC Asian Network		
82D	BBC Radio 1, BBC Radio 1Xtra & BBC Asian Network		
82E	BBC Radio 1, BBC Radio 1Xtra & BBC Asian Network		
82F	BBC Radio 1, BBC Radio 1Xtra & BBC Asian Network		
82G	BBC Radio 1 & BBC Radio 1Xtra	Formally Newsbeat (15-minute bulletins) (Now Broadcast from BBC Birmingham)	
82H	BBC Radio 1 & BBC Radio 1Xtra	Formally Newsbeat (hourly bulletins) (Now Broadcast from BBC Birmingham)	
82J	BBC Radio 1, BBC Radio 1Xtra & BBC Radio 1 Dance	"The Gallery" – All of the online video streaming content is controlled here, including studio cameras.	
82K	Latest BBC Radio 2 & BBC Radio 6 Music	New studios from converted office space	
82L	Latest BBC Radio 2 & BBC Radio 6 Music	New studios from converted office space	
82M	Latest BBC Radio 2 & BBC Radio 6 Music	New studios from converted office space	
82N	Latest BBC Radio 2 & BBC Radio 6 Music	New studios from converted office space	
83A	BBC Asian Network	News studio	
S31	BBC World Service; BBC Radio 4 BBC Radio 5 Live	Nicky Campbell (5 Live); The Media Show (Radio 4)	Visual Radio Studio
S32	BBC World Service & BBC Radio 4	Newsday; World Update; The World at One; PM	
S33	BBC Radio 4	Today; The World Tonight	
S34	BBC World Service	World Briefing	
S42	BBC World Service & BBC Radio 4		
S46	BBC World Service & BBC Radio 4	Newscast	Visual Radio Studio, Living Room
S48	BBC World Service & BBC Radio 4		
SL1	BBC World Service & BBC Radio 4	World Briefing; Six O'Clock News; Midnight News; The Newsroom	
WG1	BBC General News Service (GNS) networked national news bulletins for BBC English Regions. From 8 January 2024 for BBC Radio 2 and 6 Music news bulletins		
Newsroom	Multipurpose	Outside Source (radio)	

==== Television studios ====
Studio	Users	Programmes
A	Multipurpose (Green screen virtual studio)	BBC News channel BBC Election Coverage & Special Programmes
B	BBC One; BBC News	BBC News at Six; BBC News at Ten; BBC Weekend News; BBC London (Evening and Late Night); Sunday with Laura Kuenssberg; Politics London; BBC Election Coverage & Special Programmes
C	BBC News	BBC News channel
D	Multipurpose	BBC News at Six; BBC News at Ten; BBC Weekend News; BBC London (Breakfast, Lunch and Weekends); BBC News channel (back-up studio); HARDtalk; Politics London
E	BBC News; BBC One	BBC News channel BBC Election Coverage (TOTH BBC News Summary); Verified Live; The Context; Business Today; The World Today with Maryam Moshiri; News Now
F	BBC News; BBC Three (CSO green screen Studio)	The Catch Up
G	BBC Weather (CSO green/blue screen Studio)	BBC Weather
H	BBC Weather (CSO green/blue screen Studio)	BBC Weather
J	BBC News; BBC Verify (Plasma newsroom mezzanine position)	Verified Live (fact-checking segments); Ros Atkins on... BBC Election Coverage
Streaming Centre	BBC News; BBC Verify (Plasma newsroom mezzanine position)	BBC News channel UK opt-outs BBC News Live; BBC News iPlayer, BBC News Polska
K	BBC World Service	BBC Russian, BBC Ukrainian, BBC What's New (African youth bulletin), BBC Hausa, BBC Afrique
L	BBC World Service; BBC News	BBC Pashto (13:30 GMT weekdays), BBC Cash Eco, BBC World Service specials (e.g. BBC Persian election results programme 2013); Newswatch
M	BBC World Service (CSO green screen studio)	Short language bulletins to various World Service partners
P	BBC World Service (CSO green screen studio)	Short language bulletins to various World Service partners
V	BBC One	The One Show; Special Programmes
34D	BBC World Service	BBC Arabic Television
44D	Multipurpose (Green screen virtual studio)	
54D	BBC World Service; BBC Two	BBC Persian Television; Newsnight
Outside Plaza	various	The One Show; Special Programmes; BBC Election Coverage; BBC News; Unspun World

Until programmes air information is subject to change. All times listed are either Greenwich Mean Time or British Summer Time depending on what is being used in London.

== Artworks ==
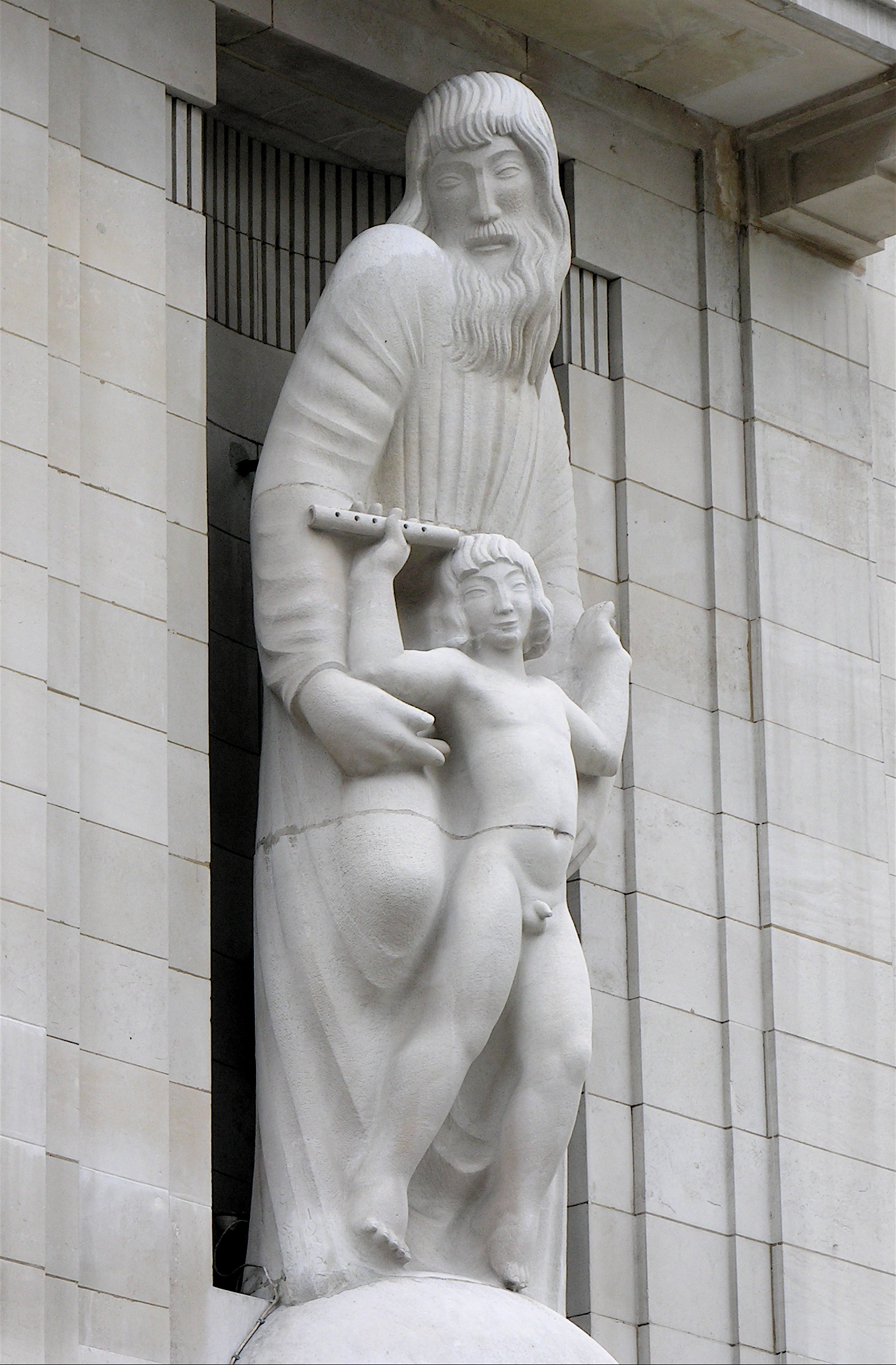
Prospero and Ariel by Eric Gill

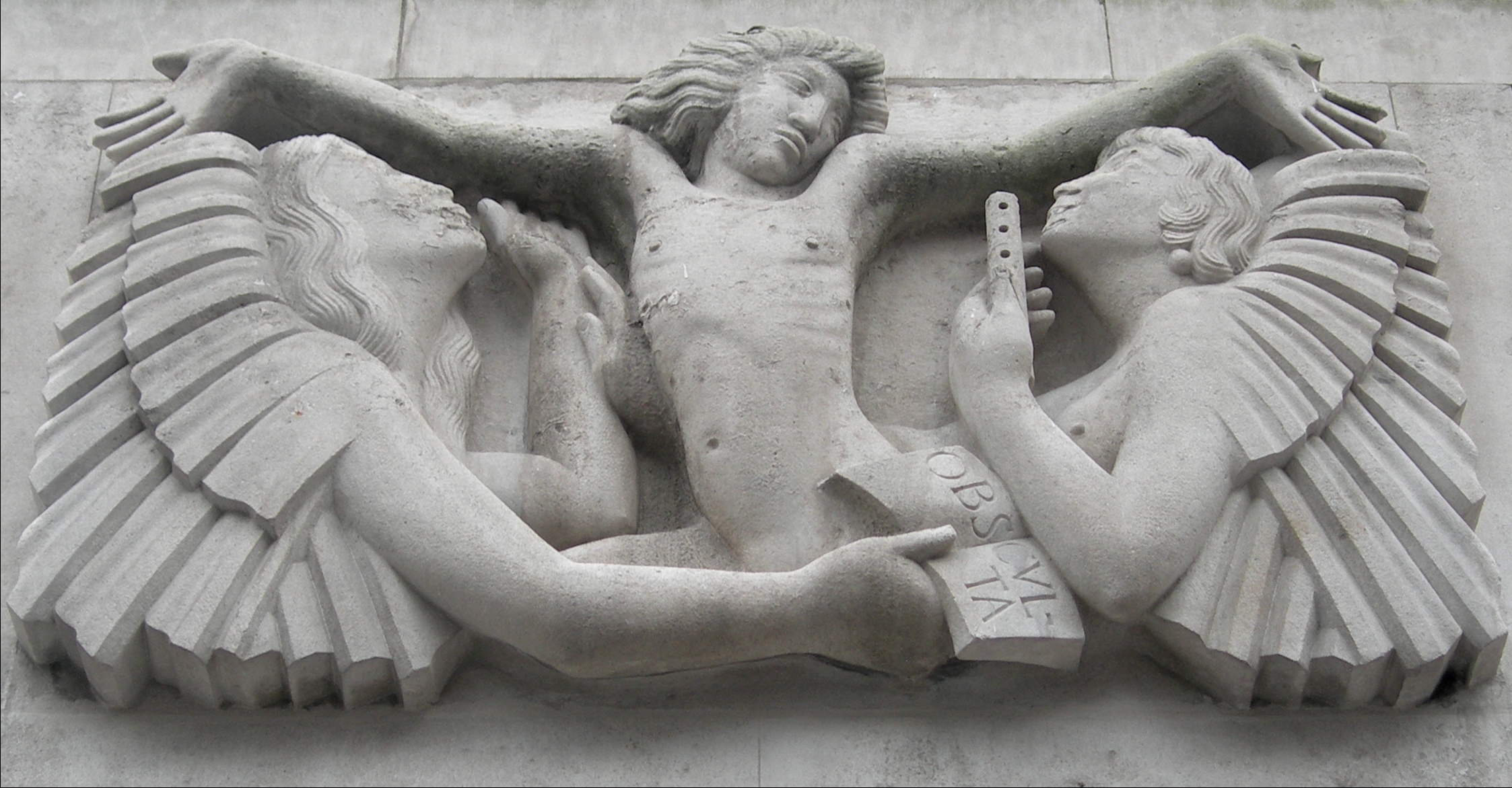
Ariel between Wisdom and Gaiety by Eric Gill

The building showcases works of art, most prominently the statues of Prospero and Ariel (from Shakespeare's The Tempest) by Eric Gill. Their choice was fitting since Prospero was a magician and scholar, and Ariel a spirit of the air, in which radio waves travel. There was, reportedly, controversy over some features of the statues when built and they were said to have been modified. They were reported to have been sculpted by Gill as God and Man, rather than Prospero and Ariel, and that there is a small carved picture of a beautiful girl on the back of Prospero. Additional carvings of Ariel are on the exterior in many bas-reliefs, some by Gill, others by Gilbert Bayes. The reception area contains a statue of 'The sower' by Gill.

The statues of Prospero and Ariel have attracted controversy historically, and in recent years due to the creator's diary describing incest with two daughters and intercourse with his pet dog, given the sexual nature of the statue: In 1930, the statue's penis size impropriety was brought up in the house of commons. In 2013, two child sexual abuse charities (The Survivors Trust and NAPAC) called for its removal. In 2017, parliament declined a petition for its removal on grounds that it was not a parliament responsibility. in 2023, 38 Degrees presented a petition with 3000 signatures. in 2026, The Daily Express published a report with pedestrians, called "‘They’re sick!’ Londoners shocked by story of BBC statue".

The BBC has declined to remove the statue, citing Gill's status as one of the pre-eminent British artists of the 20th century, and the listed classification of the building. On 13 January 2022, the statue was vandalised by a man wielding a hammer, who wrote "Time to go was 1989" and "noose all paedos" on the statue. The protection and restoration cost 513,000 pounds. Change.org presented a petition with 1,391 verified signatures against the restoration.

Several works of art were commissioned by the BBC for a redevelopment of Broadcasting House in 2003, at an overall cost of more than £4 million. Among these is World, a pavement artwork by the Canadian-born architect and artist Mark Pimlott. According to the BBC, the work "reflects the global dimension of the BBC’s broadcasting and consists of over 750 stone flags inscribed with place names from around the world, as well as those from history, mythology and fantasy. The artwork is enhanced by elegant steel lines of longitude and latitude, a subtle scheme of small embedded lights and some audio installation linked to key output from the World Service."

On the roof of the John Peel wing, mirroring the radio mast, is Breathing, a cone-shaped glass structure reaching into the sky to the same height as the mast. It was sculpted by Jaume Plensa as a memorial to journalists killed in the line of duty. It includes words from a poem by James Fenton and is illuminated day and night. At 10 pm daily, in line with the BBC News at Ten, a column of light shines 900 metres (3,000 ft) into the sky. It was officially unveiled on 16 June 2008, by the UN Secretary-General Ban Ki-moon.

== Broadcasting House in literature ==
The earliest use of Broadcasting House as a setting in fiction would seem to be in the 1934 detective novel Death at Broadcasting House by Val Gielgud and Holt Marvell (Eric Maschwitz), where an actor is found strangled in Studio 7C. Broadcasting House is a central feature in Penelope Fitzgerald's novel Human Voices, published in 1980, where the lead characters work for the BBC during the Second World War. It is also the work place of Alexander Wedderburn in A. S. Byatt's 1995 novel Still Life, and Sam Bell in Ben Elton's 1999 novel Inconceivable, and also that of the evil Nazi-sympathiser Ezzy Pound in Michael Paraskos's 2016 novel In Search of Sixpence. The building is well realised as a setting in Nicola Upson's 2015 mystery novel London Rain.

== Statue of George Orwell ==
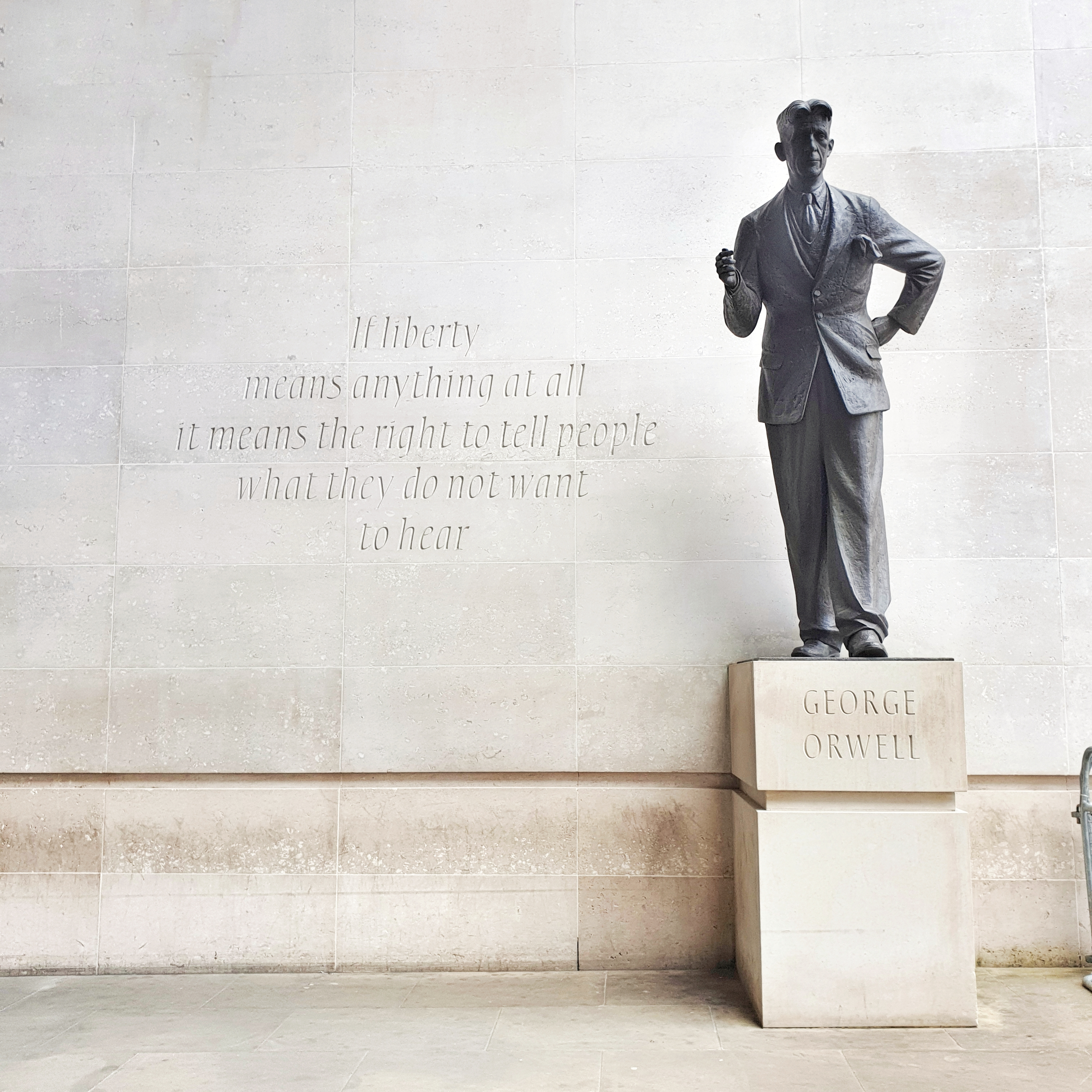
Statue of George Orwell outside Broadcasting House, headquarters of the BBC

The head of BBC history, Robert Seatter, has said George Orwell in his novel Nineteen Eighty-Four (1949), "reputedly based his notorious Room 101 from the novel "on a room he had worked in whilst at the BBC.""

On 7 November 2017, a statue of Orwell, sculpted by the British sculptor Martin Jennings, was unveiled, outside Broadcasting House. The wall behind the statue is inscribed with the following phrase: "If liberty means anything at all, it means the right to tell people what they do not want to hear". These are words from his proposed preface to Animal Farm and a rallying cry for the idea of free speech in an open society.

== MI5 involvement ==
In 1985 it was revealed by The Observer that MI5 had had a special office in the building from 1937 for the purpose of vetting BBC employees for national security purposes.

== See also ==
- List of BBC properties
- BBC Television Centre
- Bush House
- Granada TV Studios, Manchester
