= DJ Maryam =

- Born: Mahshar Nasrollahi; May 11, 1986 (age 39); Tehran, Iran
- Occupation(s): Electronic musician, DJ
- Years active: 2000–present

Mahshar Nasrollahi (Persian: محشر نصراللهی) known as DJ Maryam (Persian: دی‌جی مریم) (born May 11, 1986, in Tehran) is an Iranian singer and DJ.

== Musical career ==
She started singing as a child with the encouragement of her parents and learned various instruments, singing and opera. As a teenager, she performed several dedicated concerts for women, mostly related to Nativity and religious chants, until in the early 2001s, a cassette with her voice was released in Iran. The flaw was allegedly stolen during a test run. The singer of these songs was known by letters such as DJ Maryam and Maryam Raha, but her real identity was not known, although fake pictures, fake clips and various rumors were published about her. It was even rumored that she was imprisoned, had her fingernails cut and her tongue cut off. Of course, Maryam was pressured after that, spent some time under house arrest, and even attempted suicide. During the 2005 presidential election campaign, she held a concert in support of Akbar Hashemi Rafsanjani in the Takhti Hall of the Rasht Azdi Stadium for women, which was attended by about 5,000 to 7,000 people. Nasrallah claimed a year later that she had been forced to hold an election concert. In an interview with the BBC in 2006, she announced that she had left Iran and intended to continue her activities outside of Iran.
