= Aldford House =

Park Lane mansion

Coordinates: 51.5084°N 0.1537°W

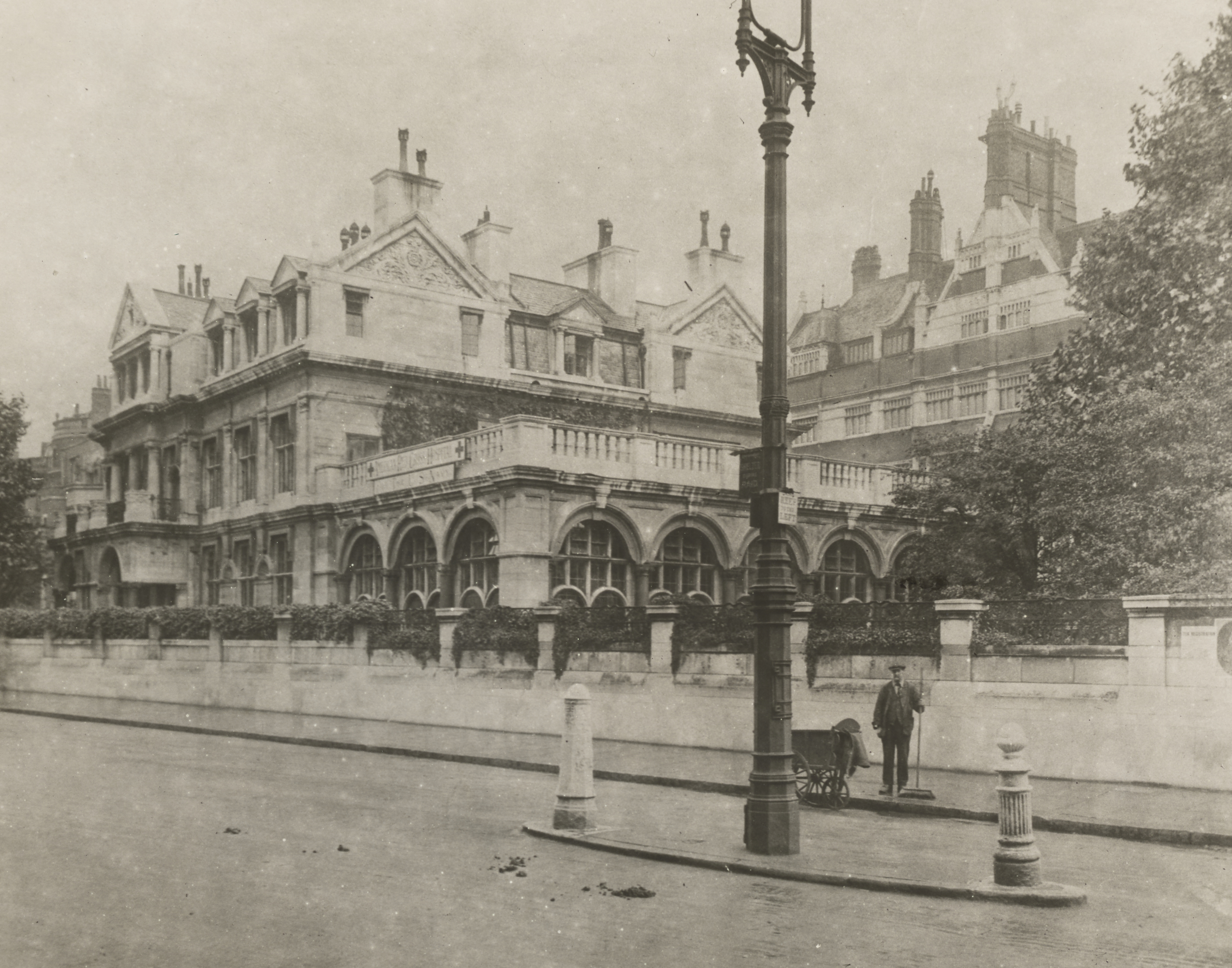
Aldford House in 1918

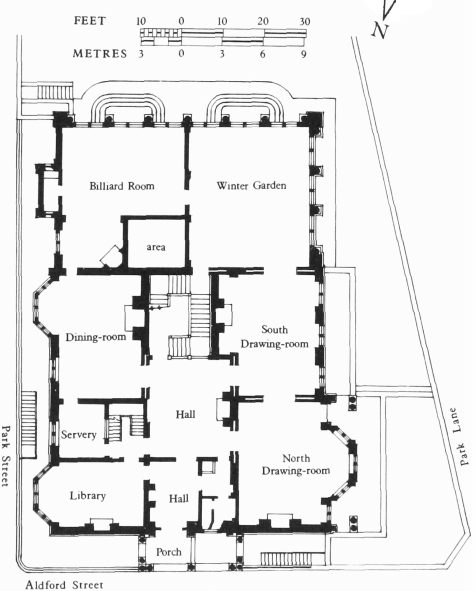
The ground floor plan of Beit's mansion in 1898, including a billiard room and winter garden.

Aldford House was a grand mansion built on London's Park Lane in 1894–97 for the diamond magnate, Alfred Beit. The architects were the Scottish partnership of Eustace Balfour and Hugh Thackeray Turner. Its style was somewhat Jacobean but it was not well-received and was demolished in 1929. A block of flats with the same name was then constructed on the site by the architectural partnership of George Val Myer and F. J. Watson-Hart, advised by Edwin Lutyens.
