= Raymond McGrath =

Australian-born architect and interior designer

- Born: 7 March 1903; Sydney, Australia
- Died: 23 December 1977 (aged 74); Dublin, Ireland
- Education: Sydney University; Westminster School of Art; Clare College, Cambridge
- Known for: Architecture & Interior Design

Raymond McGrath (7 March 1903 – 23 December 1977) was an Australian-born architect, illustrator, printmaker and interior designer who for the greater part of his career was Principal Architect for the Office of Public Works in Ireland.

== Biography ==
=== Early life ===
McGrath, the only surviving son of Herbert Edgar McGrath (1876-1963) and Edith May Sorrell (d 1946), was born in Gladesville, New South Wales. An elder brother, Ivor, died in infancy, and his sister Eileen (who became a notable sculptor and graphic designer) was born in 1907. Herbert McGrath was born in New Zealand but his family had moved to New South Wales when he was a child and Edith Sorrell had been born in New South Wales. The couple married in 1899. Both their families were of mixed Irish and English descent.

McGrath was educated at Parramatta North Public School until 1911 when he was moved to Gladesville Public School and from there in 1916 won a high school bursary to Fort Street Boys School in nearby Sydney. In 1921 McGrath enrolled in the Faculty of Arts at Sydney University but subsequently transferred to the School of Architecture. While attending university McGrath also studied painting at the Julian Ashton School. In 1924 he published, in a limited edition of 30 copies on Japanese vellum, a book of woodcut illustrations and poetry entitled The Seven Songs of Meadow Lane. McGrath graduated in 1926 Bachelor of Architecture with first class honours and as the winner of the Wentworth travelling scholarship.

=== Cambridge and London ===
The Wentworth scholarship allowed McGrath to move to London where he studied at the Westminster School of Art before taking up a fellowship at Clare College, Cambridge. While at Clare, Mansfield Forbes had McGrath redecorate the interior of Finella, a large Victorian house on the Cambridge backs, belonging to Gonville and Caius College. McGrath's bold modernist remodelling of Finella made adventurous use of materials, with copper-clad doors, an aluminium-walled bathroom, mirrored ceilings and a rubberised floor decorated with Pictish motifs.

Setting up practice in London in 1930, McGrath's first commission was to design the interiors for Broadcasting House in Portland Place, London. To assist with such a large commission, he solicited the help of Wells Coates and Serge Chermayeff; the latter was passing through London and would emigrate to America in 1940. Further interior design jobs followed, including a design for the aeroplane interiors for Imperial Airways.

McGrath was particularly interested in the architectural and decorative use of glass, writing several articles for the Architectural Review in the 1930s, and in 1937 publishing the highly influential book Glass in Architecture and Decoration. Some of his 1934 etched glass doors can still be seen at RIBA's headquarters in Portland Place, London.

McGrath's personal major building project was the modernist circular St Ann's Court, Chertsey in 1936. The house was built for stockbroker Gerald L. Schlesinger and his partner the landscape architect Christopher Tunnard.

He illustrated Anthony Bertram's 1937 pamphlet, Design in Everyday Things, published by the BBC to tie in with Bertram's radio series of the same title.

=== World War Two ===
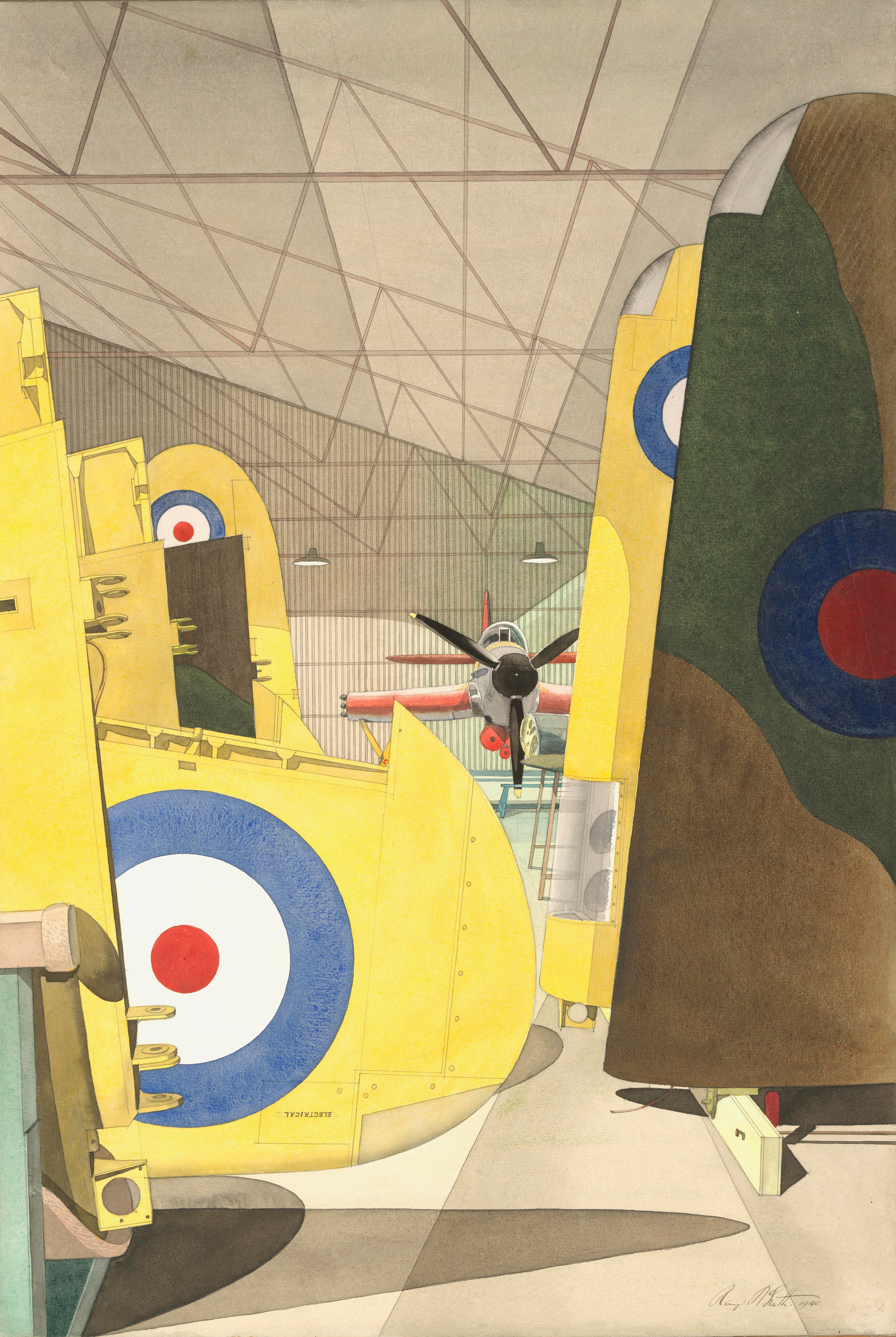
Training - Aircraft Under Construction (1940) (Art.IWM ART LD65)

At the beginning of World War Two, McGrath wrote to the War Artists' Advisory Committee, WAAC, with a proposal to produce an illustrated book on war-time aircraft production. As a result McGrath was commissioned to produce twelve drawings on the subject, for which he visited several aircraft factories. In all WAAC accepted 16 pieces from McGrath before he left England to take up the post of Senior Architect in the Office of Public Works in Dublin. McGrath also submitted some drawings of bomb damage in London which WAAC declined to accept. A number of McGrath's aircraft paintings were included in the Britain at War exhibition held at the Museum of Modern Art in New York during 1941.

=== Later life ===
In 1940 McGrath moved to Dublin where he was appointed Senior Architect at the Office of Public Works. In 1948 he was appointed Principal Architect, a post he held until 1968. He quickly took command of the resources which were available to give a recognizable "look" to Ireland's state buildings. These included specially designed woolen carpets, Waterford glass chandeliers, Irish silk poplin hangings and, in terms of fittings, 18th-century chimney-pieces and ornamental plasterwork. He acted as supervisor and co-ordinator of the decor as well as the architecture, using his extensive knowledge of Irish architecture of the Georgian period.

In the early 1950s McGrath embarked on the series of specially-woven carpets which are the particular hallmark of his government work. These were installed in public buildings in Ireland and in Irish embassies all over the world. The projects at the Irish Embassy in Paris were particularly pleasing to him. The embassy was an impressive 19th-century building, and the task of furnishing it fell to the Ambassador, William P. Fay and his wife Lillian. The Fays worked closely with McGrath, who among other things designed the carpets and chose the furniture; McGrath was assisted by Noel de Chenu. When the Fays were later appointed to Washington, they again called on McGrath to fit out a new embassy building.

Throughout his 25-year programme of designing carpets for State building, McGrath relied on the traditional skills of hand-knotted carpet manufacture in pure wool which were available at Donegal Carpets in Killybegs. Through his support this company was enabled to keep up production even in the most difficult times in the 1960s and after.

In Dublin, McGrath's principal concern was the restoration of Dublin Castle, which started in the late 1950s and continued for decades. Among the buildings he designed was the Royal Hibernian Academy, RHA, building in Ely Place, Dublin. He had been appointed an associate member of the RHA in 1949 and became a full member in 1967. The following year he became the academy's professor of architecture. For many years, starting in 1946, McGrath championed and worked on the design for a National Concert Hall for Ireland which was to be built at Raheny. However the project was always dogged by political complications and was eventually cancelled in 1973. McGrath died in Dublin a few years later in 1977, at the age of 74.

== Publications ==
- The Seven Songs of Meadow Lane (1924),
- Glass in Architecture and Decoration (1937), Raymond McGrath, Albert Childerstone Frost and Harold Edward Beckett, Architectural Press, London.
- Twentieth Century Houses (1934), Faber and Faber London.
