= Farnaz Ghazizadeh =

Iranian journalist (born 1974)

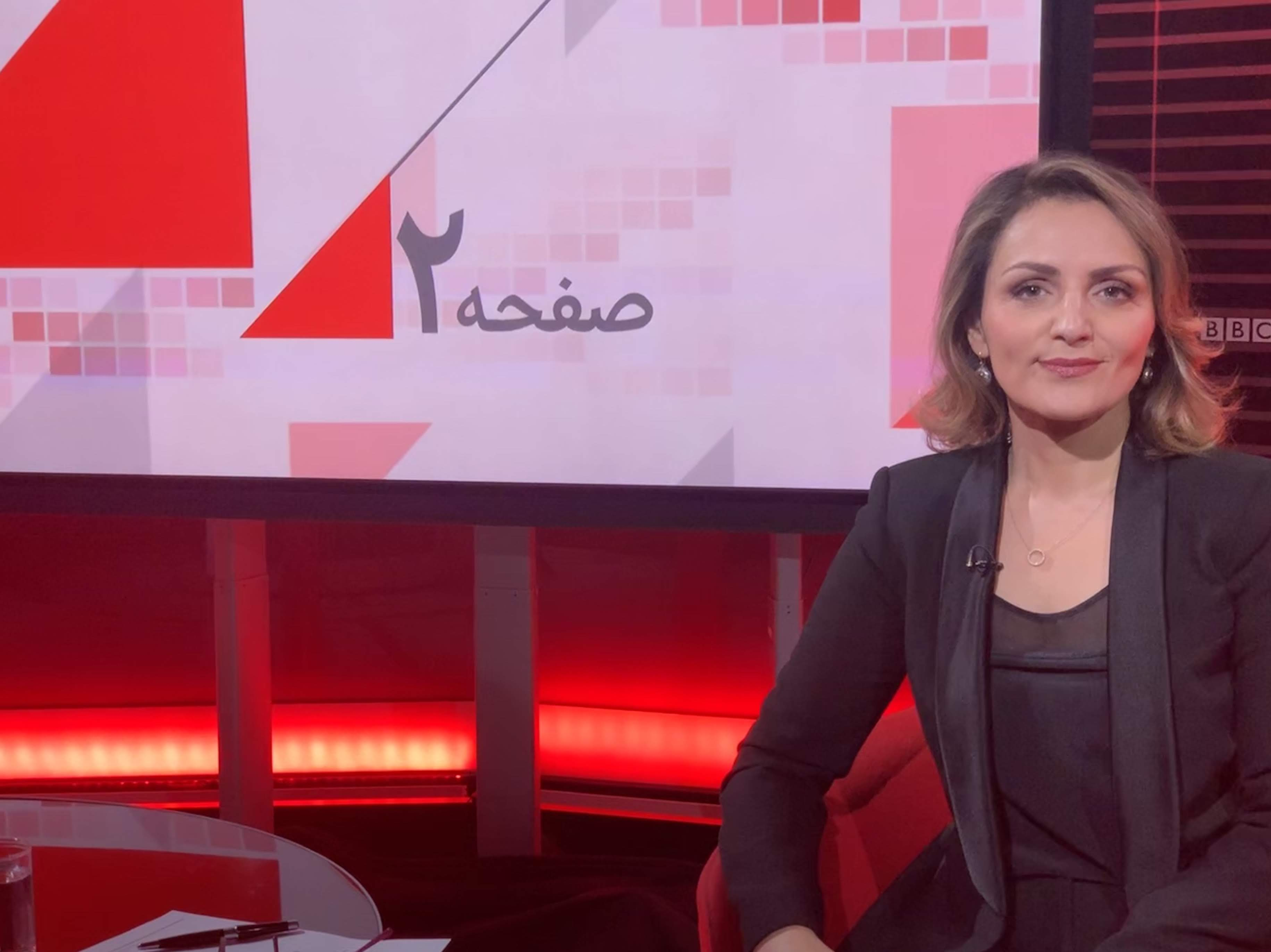
- Born: 3 December 1974 (age 51); Tehran, Iran
- Occupations: Journalist, Presenter, Newsreader
- Employer: BBC Persian

Farnaz Ghazizadeh (Persian: فرناز قاضی‌زاده; born 3 December 1974) is an Iranian journalist, and BBC Persian Television presenter. She has been involved with BBC Persian Television.
