= Negin Shiraghaei =

Iranian activist, entrepreneur, & reporter

- Born: Iran
- Citizenship: Iranian
- Occupations: Journalist, media professional
- Employer: BBC Persian
- Known for: Journalism, reporting for BBC Persian, advocacy for women's rights

Negin Shiraghaei is an Iranian activist and former news anchor for BBC Persian, as well as the founder and director of Azadi Network, a UK-based organization focused on promoting the "Woman, Life, Freedom" movement in Iran.

== Career ==
Before joining the BBC in January 2009, Shiraghaei worked as a journalist for the Iranian news outlets Hamshahri Newspaper, Shargh Newspaper, the Cultural Heritage News Agency, and ISNA News Agency.

In November 2017, The Times reported that Iranian authorities had attempted to influence her reporting through the intimidation of her family in Iran. In a BBC interview, she discussed her experience, including the harassment of her family.

She co-founded March Health, a company described as an "AI-powered women's health solution aimed at addressing physical and psychological menstrual discomfort". She was also a director of Coding for Girls Limited.

In 2018, she addressed the UN Human Rights Council, discussing methods used by Iran to restrict free expression and the importance of addressing online harassment of female journalists.
