= Tohi =

Tohi may refer to the following people:

- Aisea Tohi (born 1987), Tongan sprint runner
- Sopolemalama Filipe Tohi (born 1959), Tongan artist
- Tohi Te Ururangi (died 1864), New Zealand tribal leader and assessor
- Tohi (singer) (born 1988), Iranian Singer
- Poonch River, also Tohi, a river in India and Pakistan

== See also ==
- Tohi Tala Niue, a defunct Niuean daily newspaper
