= George Val Myer =

English architect (1883–1959)

- Born: 14 February 1883; Hereford, Herefordshire
- Died: 25 February 1959 (aged 76); University College Hospital, London
- Education: University College School; University College London
- Spouse(s): Doris Krauss (m. 1912) Betty Vera Cowell (m. 1938)
- Military career
- Branch: British Army
- Service years: 1914–18, 1939–40
- Rank: Lieutenant Colonel
- Unit: Royal Engineers
- Conflicts: World War I

Lieutenant Colonel George Valentine Samuel Myer FRIBA (14 February 1883 – 25 February 1959) was an English architect and portrait painter appointed by the British Broadcasting Corporation to design one of the first purpose built broadcast buildings in the world, Broadcasting House, Langham Place, London completed in 1932.

== Career ==
Myer was born to Grenville David Myer (1847–1918) and Rachel Matilda Simmons (1858–1947).

Hereford-born Myer started in practice on his own account at nineteen, specialising in medium-sized houses, then continued in partnership with John W Fair (Fair and Myer) including designing houses in Gidea Park, Romford, Essex.

By 1928, his career had progressed sufficiently to have completed the design of Asia House in Lime Street (1912–13) and Portsoken House in the Minories (1927–28). This experience in office design would prove invaluable to his commission for Broadcasting House, as would his experience as a collaborative commercial architect.

The later partnership of George Val Myer and F J Watson-Hart was to undertake significant commissions in the reconstruction of Park Lane for the Grosvenor Estate. Aldford House (1930–2) was a modernistic apartment block with classical stylings imposed by Sir Edwin Lutyens and Fountain House (1935–38) followed the design guidance of Sir Giles Gilbert Scott.

Val Myer was a successful commercial architect whose work typified the conventions of that remit and his time. His notability derives from his design response to the opportunities presented by his most significant commission.

=== Broadcasting House ===
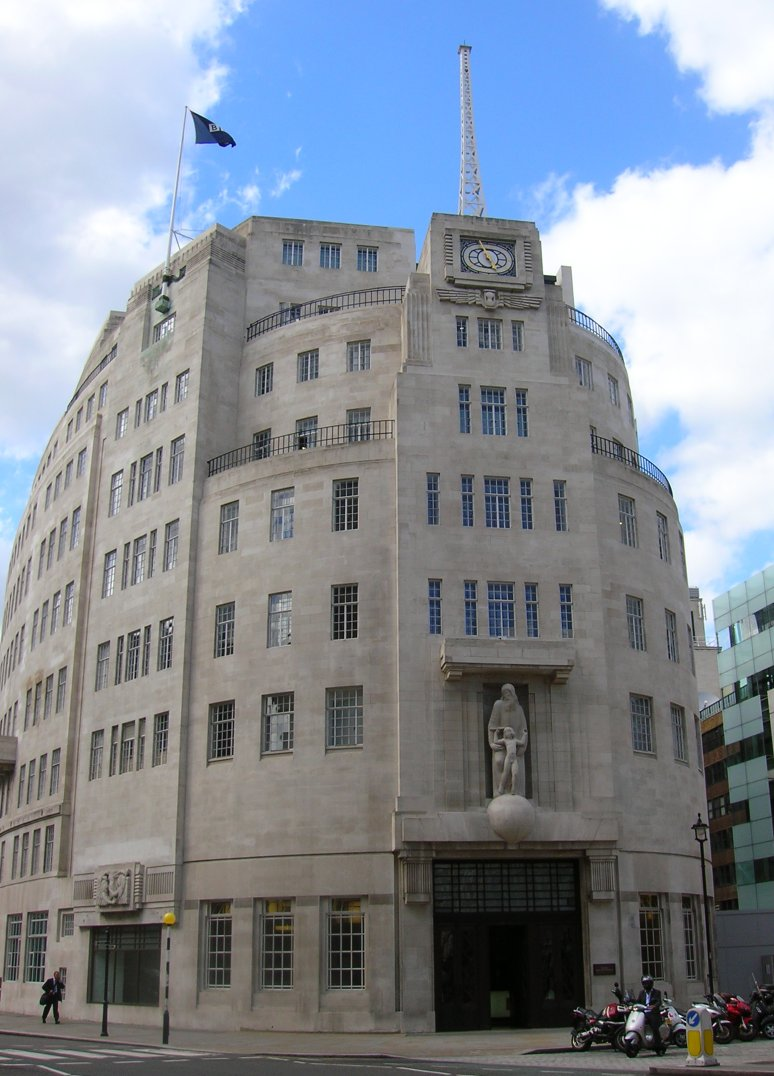
Broadcasting House was designed by Val Myer and M. T. Tudsbery

Val Myer and Watson-Hart had been working in 1927 for the consortium headed by Lord Waring that owned the sites at the bottom of Portland Place that the BBC had identified as a potential location for their new broadcast building. Val Myer, starting as the landlord's architect, came to undertake the lease-holder's bespoke design. For the BBC, their own civil engineer, M T Tudsbery had selected the site and development strategy and was to determine the technical and functional brief.

Val Myer named his original design 'the Top Hat design' and it was frequently compared, from its first appearance, to a 1930s ocean liner for its clean-cut lines and allusions to New York Art Deco. The building linked emphatically to the rest of Regent Street through its complementary use of Portland stone but was modernistic in spirit, and adorned with radical sculptural commissions by Eric Gill, most notably the statues of Ariel and Prospero.

Val Myer worked alongside M T Tudsbery and formulated the approach of locating the office accommodation around the outside of the building to insulate a massive central brick tower of 22 broadcast studios from noise intrusion. Acoustic separation was pursued through the development of novel constructional technologies and strategies at all levels of design. Val Myer's work as chief architect of the building and the concert hall was supplemented by that of a BBC team of architects for the interiors headed by Raymond McGrath that included Serge Chermayeff, Wells Coates, Dorothy Warren Trotter and Edward Maufe, each a bespoke commission for a distinct function.

War damage, technological change and the severe environmental limitations and inflexibility of the original design have caused the original studio interiors to be almost wholly replaced. Key surviving interiors have been restored in works concluded in 2009.

=== Personal life ===
On 8 October 1912 at the New West End Synagogue, Myer married Doris Krauss, the younger daughter of Sydney Krauss. In 1938 he remarried to Betty Vera Cowell (1900–1976).
