= Nafiseh Kohnavard =

Iranian journalist

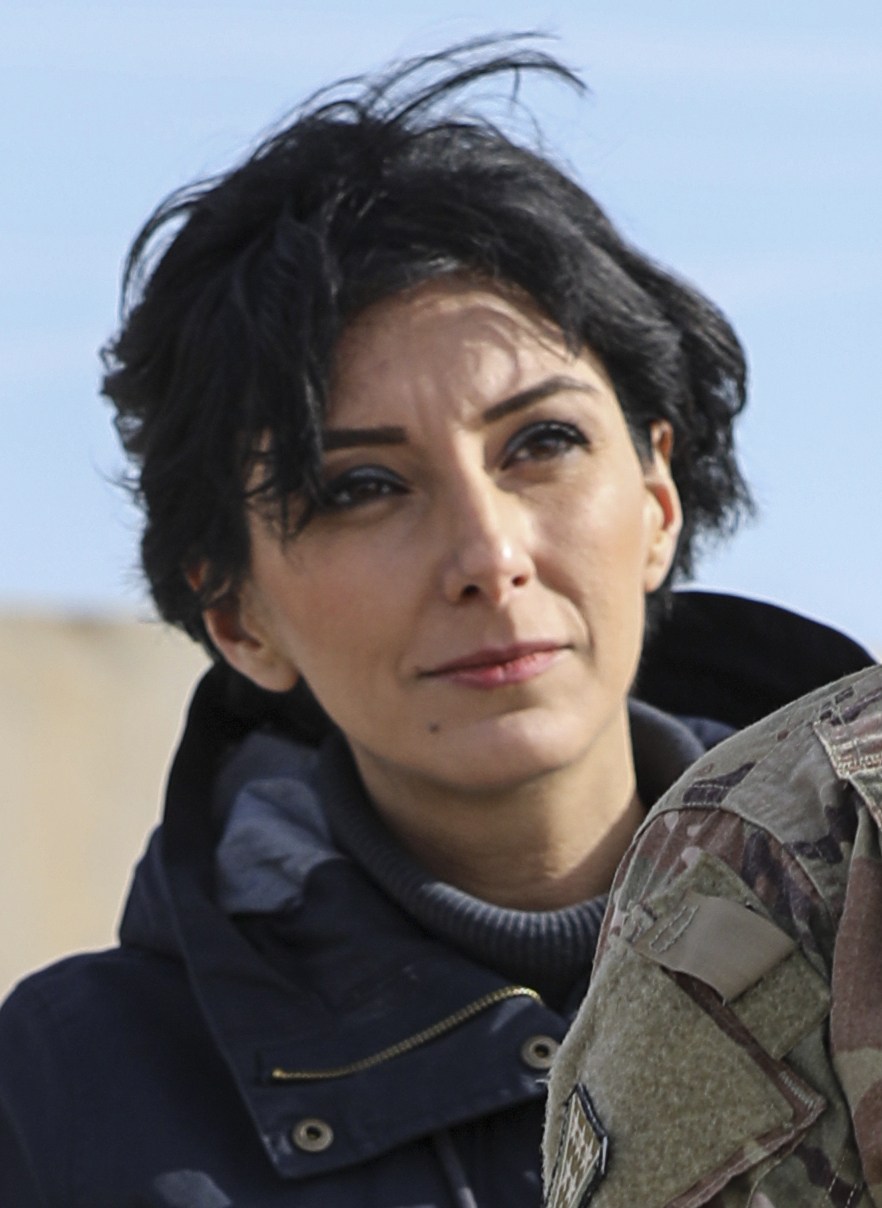
- Kohnavard at Al Asad Airbase in 2020
- Born: Urmia, Iran
- Education: Shahid Beheshti University
- Occupation: BBC Middle East Correspondent
- Years active: 2002–present

Nafiseh Kohnavard (Persian: نفیسه کوهنورد) is a multilingual correspondent who is focused on Middle East issues for BBC World Service/ BBC Persian.

She has covered the fight against Islamic State in Iraq and Syria, the siege of Sinjar, Iraq, where the terrorist group massacred thousands of people from the Yazidi, religious minority, and the battle between Islamic State and the Kurdish Peshmerga for Kobane in Syria. Kohnavard has been based in Turkey, Lebanon, Iraq, as well as the UK and spent most of her time for some years on the front lines against Islamic State militants with the Kurdish Peshmarga, Iraqi, and US army forces.

Kohnavard was born in Urmia, Iran. She started her career in Tehran and was sacked by hardline President Mahmoud Ahmadinejad from the Persian daily Hamshahri after she asked outgoing president Khatami a few questions in her interview about the "parallel Intelligence services" and Kayhan published articles accusing her of being a spy.

Kohnavard's work has included human interest stories of people affected by conflicts. Kohnavard told the story of Yazidi women who had children fathered by their ISIS captors in a documentary for BBC Persian and World Service's OUR WORLD program called "Yazidi's Secret Children", produced and directed by Katie Arnold. In 2020 the film won the One World Media Award's best TV documentary. The documentary is about Yazidi women who had been taken by IS, forced into sexual slavery, and who gave birth to children conceived of rape. After gaining their freedom, they faced a heartbreaking choice: either to leave their IS-fathered children behind and to return home, or else to keep their children and leave the Yazidi community.
