= Hannah Vaughan Jones =

British journalist and presenter

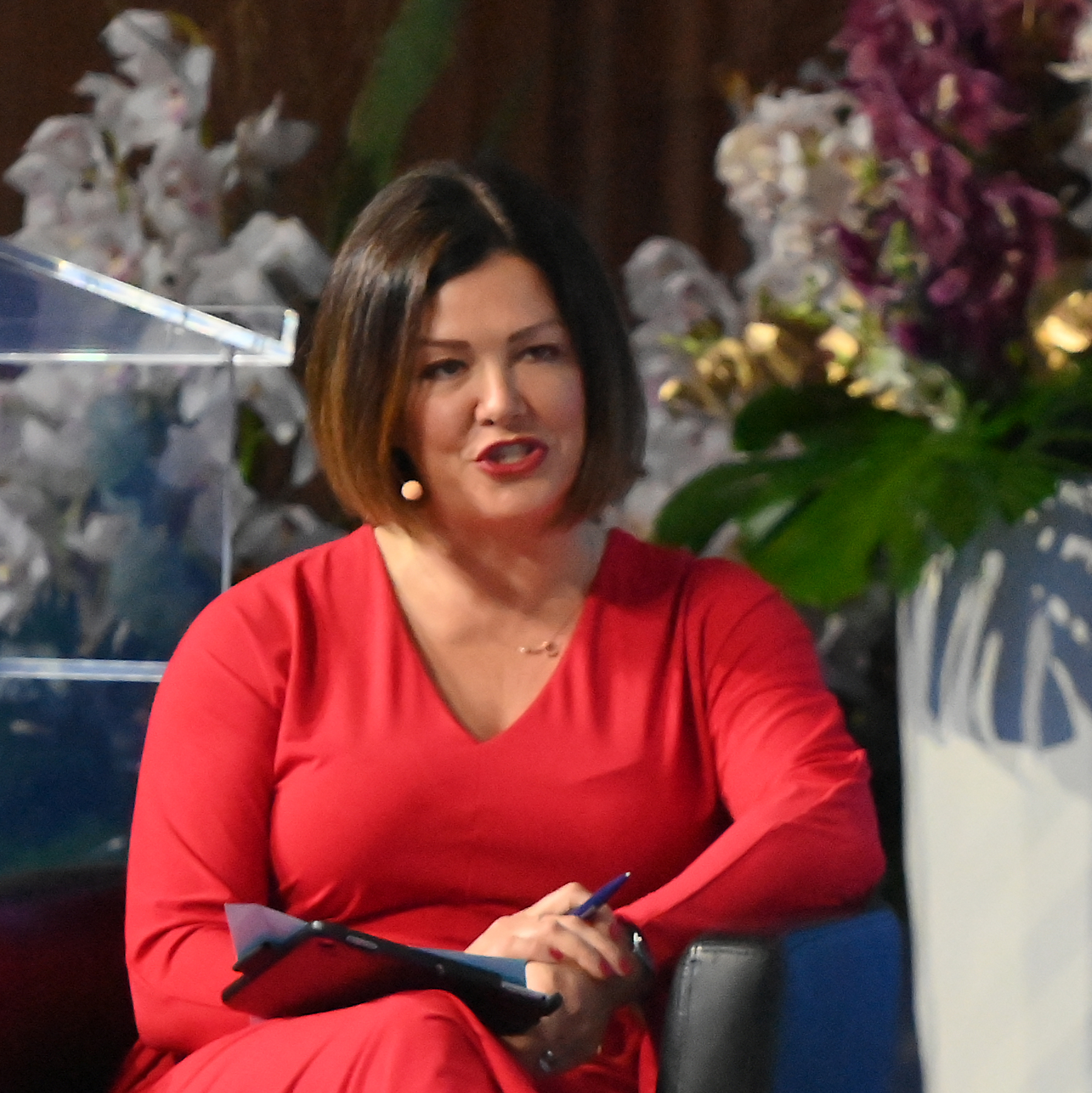
Jones in 2022

Hannah Vaughan Jones (née Tallet) is a British journalist and presenter, employed by CNN International and previously on Sky News.

== Early life ==
Jones was brought up in the West Country. Her home town is Bristol and she attended Bristol Grammar School.

== Broadcasting career ==
Prior to joining Sky in 2007, she worked as a BBC radio reporter in Bristol, a senior producer for the Associated Press and as a TV reporter for Russia Today (RT) based in Moscow. She also presented 5 News.

Vaughan Jones was the main weekday presenter on Sky's overnight coverage including the Sky World News between 3 and 6 am. She also presented across Sky's daytime output, including occasionally anchoring and co-presenting on Sky News Sunrise.

In February 2016, Vaughan Jones joined CNN International and presented the channel's daily news programme CNN Newsroom from the channel's London studio.

On 26 June 2019, Vaughan Jones hosted a live-streamed 'digital hustings' for the Conservative Party leadership election, interviewing the two final candidates Boris Johnson and Jeremy Hunt. The event was live-streamed to Facebook and Twitter (through Periscope).

In 2020, amid the COVID-19 crisis, Vaughan Jones joined The Celebs which included Frank Bruno and X Factor winner Sam Bailey to raise money for Alzheimer's Society and Action for Children. They recorded a new rendition of "Merry Christmas Everyone by Shakin' Stevens and it was released on 11 December 2020. The music video debuted on Good Morning Britain the day before "release. The song peaked at number two on the iTunes pop chart.

In April 2021, BB Partners, a newly-founded communications advisory firm, hired Vaughan Jones as its senior advisor. She departed CNN accordingly.

== Private life ==
She is married to BBC News presenter Lewis Vaughan Jones. They have one son conceived through IVF.
