= 2019 Conservative Party leadership election =

British leadership election to replace Theresa May

- 7 June – 23 July 2019
- Opinion polls
- Turnout: 87.4% (▲9.0 pp)
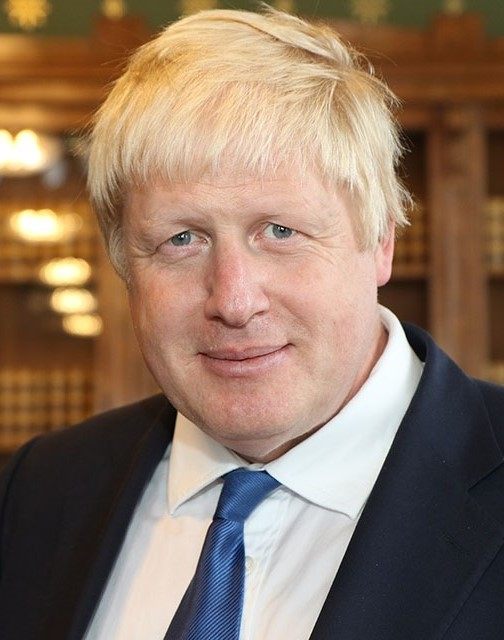

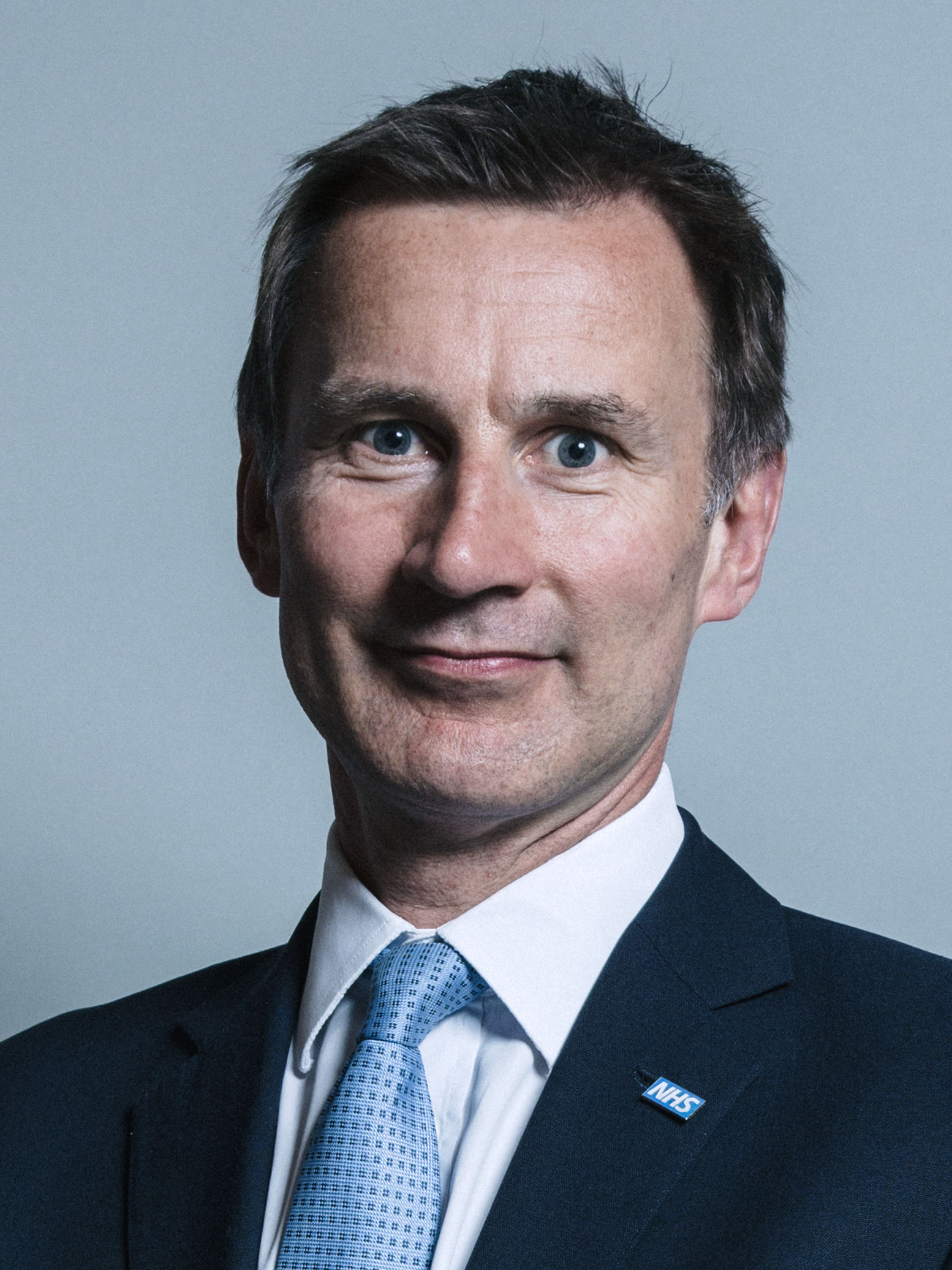
Candidate	Boris Johnson	Jeremy Hunt
Fifth MPs' ballot	160 (51.3%)	77 (24.7%)
Members' vote	92,153 (66.4%)	46,656 (33.6%)
Leader before election
Theresa May
Elected Leader
Boris Johnson

The 2019 Conservative Party leadership election was triggered when Theresa May announced on 24 May 2019 that she would resign as leader of the Conservative Party on 7 June and as Prime Minister of the United Kingdom once a successor had been elected. Nominations opened on 10 June; 10 candidates were nominated. The first ballot of members of Parliament (MPs) took place on 13 June, with exhaustive ballots of MPs also taking place on 18, 19 and 20 June, reducing the candidates to two. The general membership of the party elected the leader by postal ballot; the result was announced on 23 July, with Boris Johnson being elected with more than twice as many votes as his opponent Jeremy Hunt.

Speculation about a leadership election first arose following the party's performance at the 2017 snap general election. May had called it in hope of increasing her parliamentary majority for Brexit negotiations. However, the Conservatives lost their overall majority in the House of Commons. Subsequent speculation arose from the difficulties May had in obtaining a Brexit deal acceptable to the Conservative Party. These increased in November 2018, with members of the Eurosceptic European Research Group pushing for a vote of no confidence in May; the forty-eight letter threshold to force a confidence vote was met in December 2018; however, May won the vote and remained in office. In early 2019, Parliament repeatedly voted against May's proposed deal, leading to her resignation.

The first members' vote leadership election of the Conservative Party was held in 2001, but since then the party had been in opposition during all leadership elections except in 2016, which concluded with Andrea Leadsom withdrawing before the members' vote. Johnson became the first Conservative Party leader elected by members to immediately assume the role of prime minister.

== Background ==
After the 2016 United Kingdom European Union membership referendum saw a 52% to 48% vote in favour of leaving, David Cameron resigned as leader of the Conservative Party and as prime minister, triggering the 2016 Conservative Party leadership election. Theresa May, then serving as home secretary, won the contest after the withdrawal of Andrea Leadsom, and succeeded Cameron as prime minister on 13 July 2016.

=== Snap general election and aftermath ===
May began the process of Brexit, the UK's withdrawal from the European Union, by triggering Article 50 on 29 March 2017. In April 2017, May announced a snap general election in June in order to "strengthen her hand" when she negotiated with the European Union. May aimed to substantially increase the Conservative Party's slim majority, with opinion polls originally predicting a landslide victory for her party. However, the result was a hung parliament, with the number of Conservative seats falling from 330 to 317. This prompted her to broker a confidence and supply deal with Northern Ireland's Democratic Unionist Party (DUP) to support her minority government.

May's handling of the campaign was widely criticised, particularly the role of her chiefs of staff Nick Timothy and Fiona Hill, who both resigned within days of the result. In June 2017, George Osborne, a former chancellor of the Exchequer, described May as a "dead woman walking". A YouGov poll for The Sunday Times had 48% of respondents saying May should resign, with 38% against. A Survation poll for The Mail on Sunday showed a similar result. The former Cabinet minister Anna Soubry called for May to "consider her position" after the election result. The former Cabinet minister Nicky Morgan said that May could not lead the Conservative Party into the next general election, and called for a leadership election in the summer or in 2018 before the Brexit deal would be finalised. After the Grenfell Tower fire in June 2017, May's leadership faced further criticism following her initial refusal to meet victims, and what was described as her poor handling of the crisis.

With May's position weakened, senior figures in the party were said to be preparing for a leadership contest and "jostling for succession". Politicians and journalists did not expect May to lead the party at the next general election. Tim Shipman, Political Editor of The Sunday Times, described "the first shots in a battle that could tear the government apart" as the three leading contenders at that time for the leadership, David Davis, Boris Johnson and Philip Hammond, briefed against each other. Andrew Mitchell, an ally of Davis, was said to have told a dinner that May was finished and was said to be organising letters to force May to announce her date of departure. A July 2017 report in The Independent said a core of fifteen Conservative MPs were ready to sign letters of no confidence, with forty-eight needed to trigger a contest.

May reportedly announced to Conservative MPs in August 2017 that she would resign as prime minister on 30 August 2019. She then announced on 31 August 2017 that she intended to stay on to fight the next general election, which under the Fixed-term Parliaments Act 2011 was scheduled to be in 2022, though it could be held earlier.

On 16 September 2017, Johnson published an article in The Daily Telegraph laying out his vision for Brexit. Many saw this as a way of positioning himself for a leadership challenge, though some commentators such as columnist Iain Dale and Newsnight's political editor Nick Watt argued this was the wrong interpretation and that Johnson's motivation was to assert his influence in Brexit negotiations. The timing of the article—a few days before May was due to give a significant speech on her plans for the UK's relationship with Europe after Brexit, and shortly after a terrorist attack in London—was criticised.

=== Summer 2018 Cabinet resignations ===
Following Cabinet agreement for May's proposals on Brexit, Davis resigned as Brexit secretary on 8 July 2018. Steve Baker, a minister in the same department, resigned later the same day. On the same day it was reported that May was facing the threat of a leadership contest amid mounting anger from supporters of a hard Brexit over her government's Brexit policy. Backbencher Andrea Jenkyns called for her to be replaced, saying "Theresa May's premiership is over". Johnson later resigned as foreign secretary on 9 July 2018.

A Daily Telegraph article by Johnson opposing the burqa ban in Denmark in early August 2018 sparked controversy over the language he used, saying women wearing the burqa look like letterboxes or bank robbers. Kimiko de Freytas-Tamura, writing in the New York Times, saw it as an attempt to court an anti-Islamic segment of the Conservative Party membership, who would be the electorate in the final stage of a leadership campaign. Former attorney general Dominic Grieve said that he would not remain in the party if Johnson became leader.

=== Brexit deal presented ===
In November 2018, May presented her final proposal for an initial Brexit deal following negotiations with the EU. Brexit secretary Dominic Raab and others resigned from the Cabinet in response, with Jacob Rees-Mogg calling for a leadership election for the first time. Members of the Eurosceptic European Research Group including Rees-Mogg and Baker were seen to be launching a coup in mid-November following the Cabinet resignations. There was considerable speculation about whether enough letters of no confidence would be reached to trigger a vote.

Fifteen percent of the parliamentary party (forty-eight MPs) need to send a letter to the chairman of the 1922 Committee to trigger a no confidence vote in the Conservative Party leader. As of early afternoon on 16 November 2018, the BBC reported there were twenty-one MPs who had publicly stated they had sent a letter. Baker asserted that more letters had been sent and that he expected forty-eight to be reached in the week beginning 19 November. Some commentators expressed scepticism about this prediction. By 19 November 2018, twenty-six MPs publicly said they had submitted letters. Baker also suggested that the ERG could draw lots for who would be their candidate in a leadership election. By 20 November, the forty-eight letters had not been reached, with Rees-Mogg predicting that it may be reached in December when the House of Commons was due to vote on May's deal. However, facing likely defeat with opposition from the ERG, DUP and Conservative MPs who had supported Remain during the referendum, the vote in Parliament was delayed to January.

Conservative MPs including Dominic Grieve and Kwasi Kwarteng suggested that the party could see members leaving the party or a formal split if the party were led by Johnson.

==== 12 December confidence vote ====
By 11 December, the public count was still at twenty-six letters from MPs. That day, however, Owen Paterson publicly sent his letter and it later became clear that forty-eight letters had been submitted. May was informed, and chose to contest the vote. The confidence vote, held on 12 December, was a secret ballot of Conservative MPs.

In the week, May had been meeting EU leaders to discuss changes to her Brexit deal, but cancelled a planned 12 December meeting with the Irish Taoiseach in order to campaign to win the confidence vote. May and her supporters argued that a defeat for her would mean that Brexit would have to be delayed. In a speech to Conservative MPs immediately before voting, May said that she did not intend to lead the party into the 2022 general election and that she would seek a legally binding addition to the withdrawal agreement with the EU to address concerns over the Northern Ireland backstop.

Two MPs who had been suspended from the party, Andrew Griffiths and Charlie Elphicke, had the whip restored on the day of the vote, meaning they could also vote. Griffiths indicated his support for May; Elphicke declined to indicate his preference. There were 317 Conservative MPs able to vote. Every member of the Cabinet declared their support for May, including Leave supporters in the Cabinet like Michael Gove and Liam Fox. Notable Remain supporters in the Conservative Party including Anna Soubry also declared support for May, as did May's predecessor, David Cameron, and the leader and acting leader of the Scottish Conservatives. The Tory Reform Group announced their support for May. Notable Leave supporters outside the Cabinet, including Jacob Rees-Mogg and Bill Cash, said they would vote against her.

May won the vote by 200 for to 117 against. Brexit-supporting MPs varied in their response to the result: some, including Rees-Mogg and Raab, called on her to resign nevertheless, while others such as Paterson called on her to change her Brexit policy. As May won this vote, another party leader confidence vote could not be held for one year under standing rules.

Vote of no confidence
Option	Votes	%
Confidence	200	63.1
No confidence	117	36.9

=== Further Brexit delays and May's final days ===
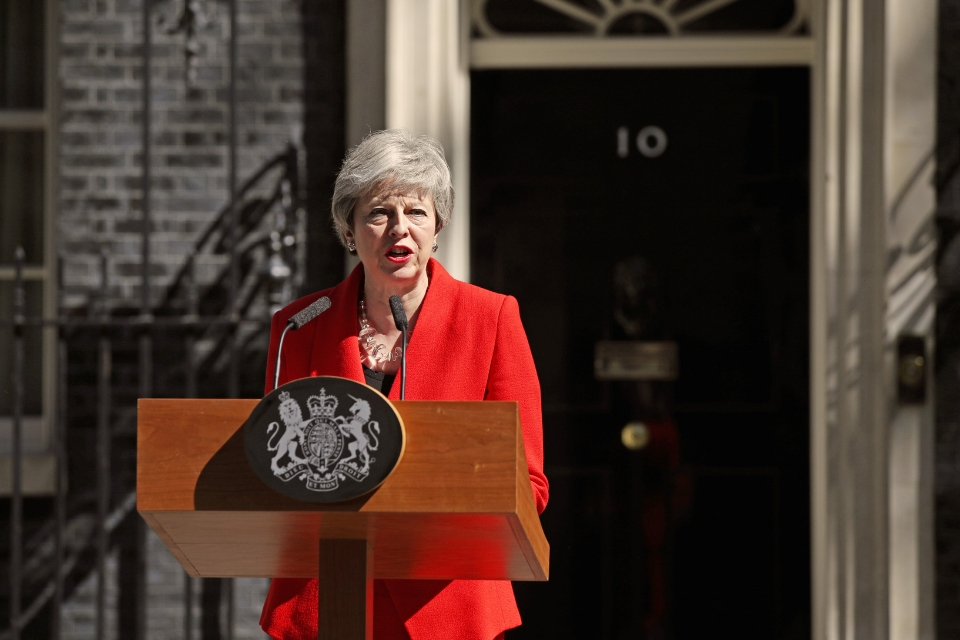
May announces her pending resignation outside 10 Downing Street on 24 May 2019; she left office on 24 July

On 27 March 2019, May said she would resign before the next stage of EU negotiations if her Brexit deal was passed. With no resolution around Brexit plans, there was continuing pressure for May to resign through April 2019.

Following poor Conservative results in the 2019 local elections—the worst since 1995, when the party lost over 1,000 seats—there were further calls from Conservatives for May to resign. Davis announced his support for Raab, who set out a leadership platform in an interview with The Sunday Times Magazine. With one report saying May intended to remain until autumn 2019, further senior Conservatives openly campaigned to replace her, including Andrea Leadsom, Jeremy Hunt, Michael Gove and Sajid Javid.

May had said that she wanted Parliament to approve her Brexit plan before the summer recess, after which she would resign, which would have been around late July. Further pressure mounted on May to be clear about her timetable for departure, with May meeting the 1922 Committee on the matter on 16 May 2019. There was talk about the Committee changing its rules to allow a new vote of no confidence in May to be held sooner. May was reported as having agreed to stand down by 30 June 2019.

On 21 May, May made a speech outlining her plan to introduce an EU withdrawal agreement bill in June that would allow the Commons to make amendments, such as amendments in favour of a Customs Union or a second referendum, but this was received badly by much of her own party as well as by other parties. There were growing calls for her to resign on 22 May, the day before the European Parliament elections. Andrea Leadsom, the leader of the House of Commons, resigned that day. May had planned to publish the bill on 24 May, but on polling day (23 May) she abandoned that plan, with publication delayed until early June. On 24 May she announced her resignation as leader of the Conservative Party, effective on 7 June 2019.

== Election procedure ==
The principles of the procedure for selecting the leader of the Conservative Party are set in the party's constitution, while the detailed rules are agreed by the 1922 Committee executive in consultation with the Conservative Party Board. Nominations for the leadership are invited by the chairman of the 1922 Committee, who acts as returning officer. When nominations close, a list of valid nominations is published. If there is only one valid nomination, that person is elected. If two valid nominations are received, both names go forward to the party membership, whose numbers equate to about 0.35% of the UK electorate. Party members can vote even if they live abroad and are not UK citizens;

If more than two nominations are received, a ballot is held within the Parliamentary party. An exhaustive ballot system is used to select two candidates to go forward to the party membership. The 1922 Committee executive considered changing the rules such that four candidates would go to the ballot of the party membership; they also recommended increasing the number of MP nominations required to eight. On 4 June a rule change was accepted by the party board, whereby candidates would require the support of eight MPs to be nominated, then the support of at least 5% of the Parliamentary Conservative Party in the first ballot, and 10% in the second ballot in order to proceed further. In 2019, this equated to requiring the support of 17 MPs in the first ballot and 33 in the second. If all candidates met the threshold then the candidate with fewest votes would be eliminated. If three or more candidates remained after the second ballot, further ballots would be held, eliminating the candidate with the fewest votes and repeating this process until two candidates remained.

Nominations opened on 7 June and closed on 10 June. The first ballot was held on 13 June, with subsequent ballots being held on 18, 19 and 20 June. The first membership hustings was scheduled for 22 June and the ballot of the membership was to take place over the following month, with the winner announced on 23 July.

== Campaign ==
=== Speculation ===
A large number of candidates attracted attention or were the subject of speculation over an extended period before the election was called. In 2017, the main contenders were initially seen to be Philip Hammond, David Davis, Boris Johnson and Amber Rudd. By early August 2017, Jacob Rees-Mogg was receiving considerable attention and he had risen to second in the betting markets after Davis. There was considerable speculation that the party's leader in Scotland, Ruth Davidson, could attempt to become the next leader, despite being ineligible as she was not an MP at Westminster. In September 2018, she said that she did not want the job and would focus on politics in Scotland.

Following renewed speculation about May's leadership after Johnson and Davis resigned from the Cabinet in summer 2018, press interest focused on Johnson, Rees-Mogg, Michael Gove, Sajid Javid and Jeremy Hunt. Dominic Raab became Brexit Secretary after Davis. In November 2018, following his resignation from the role over a proposed deal on the UK's departure from the European Union, Raab became the bookmakers' favourite to be new leader, followed by Javid or Johnson. Raab opposed holding a leadership election, but did not rule out his candidacy. Esther McVey, who resigned her position as work and pensions secretary on the same day, indicated that she would stand as a candidate if she had support.

By December 2018, Johnson, Javid and Rudd were all reported to be contemplating running if May were voted out. In November and December, other potential candidates included Gove, Hunt, Raab, Davis and Penny Mordaunt. Bookmakers had Johnson as most likely to succeed May on the morning of 12 December confidence vote.

=== Candidates declare ===
On 2 May 2019, Rory Stewart, the international development secretary, announced his candidacy for the leadership. He stated that he would "bring the country together" as prime minister. Following a poor result for the party in the 2019 local elections on 2 May 2019, Dominic Raab, Sajid Javid, Michael Gove and Matt Hancock gave speeches and interviews that the journalist Tim Shipman described as a "beauty contest between those jostling to succeed Theresa May". On 4 May 2019, David Davis announced he would not seek the party leadership, and would instead support Raab if he chose to run. On 8 May 2019, Andrea Leadsom, the Leader of the House of Commons, stated she was "seriously considering" a second bid for the party leadership. On 9 May 2019, McVey announced she would be standing for the leadership. She stated that she had "enough support" from fellow MPs to "go forward" once May stepped down as prime minister.

On 24 May, the day May resigned, Johnson told an economic conference in Switzerland that "we will leave the EU on October 31, deal or no deal". Stewart ruled out serving in a cabinet under Johnson over Johnson's support for a no-deal Brexit, which he believed was "undeliverable, unnecessary and is going to damage our country and economy". On the same day, Jeremy Hunt announced his candidacy for the leadership at a festival in his constituency. Matt Hancock, Dominic Raab, and Andrea Leadsom announced their candidacies the following day, 25 May; Michael Gove declared his own shortly afterwards, on 26 May, Sajid Javid and Kit Malthouse following the next day.

On 28 May, Gove promised to remove the charge for UK citizenship applications from EU nationals if elected. Hunt condemned a no-deal Brexit as "suicide", but McVey said it would be "political suicide" to not leave at the earliest opportunity. Both BBC News and Sky News invited candidates to debates. On 29 May, James Cleverly announced his candidacy. Hunt and Stewart both admitted during campaigning that they had taken illegal drugs in the past when abroad. The former Conservative leader Iain Duncan Smith warned on 30 May that there were too many candidates running and urged the 1922 committee to "accelerate the process". That same day, Mark Harper announced his candidacy. On 1 June, Liz Truss revealed an article of hers to be published the following day in The Mail on Sunday, providing Johnson with his first endorsement from a Cabinet minister. Donald Trump said: "I think Boris would do a very good job. I think he would be excellent." When prompted on Gove and Hunt, Trump said he liked the latter, and criticised the former for his stance on Iran.

=== After recess ===
On 2 June, Sam Gyimah said no deal would be an "abject failure" and entered the race as the only candidate to back a referendum on the Brexit deal, with the options of remaining in the EU, leaving without a deal, or leaving with the current deal. He withdrew eight days later.

The One Nation conservative caucus of MPs announced a series of hustings over the week prior to close of nominations on 10 June. With so many candidates in the race, candidates with less support from fellow MPs were under mounting pressure to leave the leadership race. James Cleverly and then Kit Malthouse dropped out of the race on 4 June.

On the same day, the 1922 Committee decided on a rule change to the contest, determining that to make the ballot, MPs must have eight nominations by 10 June. The last-placed candidate in each round would be eliminated, but in addition, to survive the first and second ballots, MPs must obtain at least 5% and 10% of the total available votes (313) respectively (plus one representing their own vote; i.e., 17 and 33 respectively). The contest was to end in the week beginning 22 July.

By 5 June, Johnson was the clear favourite with the bookmakers, with Gove second favourite. In the hustings, Javid said he did not want to "become the Brexit Party" but Johnson said the party needed to "deliver Brexit on 31 October", whilst Hancock called Jeremy Corbyn an anti-Semite. On 7 June, Gove admitted to taking cocaine twenty years previously. Before nominations formally opened on 10 June, Johnson promised to cut income tax for higher earners and Gove to reduce VAT. Johnson also pledged to refuse to pay £39 billion to the EU. The candidates Hunt, Raab, Hancock, McVey and Gove all formally launched their campaigns on 10 June. Johnson launched his campaign on 12 June. He sidestepped a question about his previous admission that he had taken cocaine.

Raab said that he would be willing to prorogue Parliament in order to ensure the UK's departure from the European Union, particularly in order to leave without a deal. Johnson refused to rule out prorogation, leading to Stewart saying that he would set up an "alternative Parliament" to stop him if he prorogued Parliament.

On 13 June, the chancellor Philip Hammond wrote to candidates asking them to restrict themselves in any policy pledges they made to the current 2% of GDP deficit limit. This followed Raab saying he would reduce the income tax basic rate by 5p costing more than £20 billion annually, and Johnson saying he would raise the higher tax rate starting threshold from £50,000 to £80,000 costing £10 billion annually.

=== MP ballots ===
In the first MP ballot on 13 June, Leadsom, Harper and McVey were eliminated as they failed to obtain 17 votes. Johnson came first, with over a third of MPs' support—enough to ensure, were none of those who voted for him to change their minds in subsequent ballots, that he would be one of the final two on whom the membership voted. Hancock withdrew the next day.

Johnson was criticised for avoiding media interviews and not participating in the first TV debate, held on 16 June on Channel 4. All the other candidates took part, with an Opinium survey of those watching the debate having Stewart as the winner.

In the second MP ballot on 18 June, Johnson retained his substantial lead, increased by twelve compared to the first ballot. Hunt retained second place, but Stewart was the biggest gainer, up 18. Raab was eliminated as both the bottom candidate and for getting less than the required 33 votes. All five remaining candidates, Johnson, Hunt, Gove, Stewart and Javid, took part in a BBC debate later that same day. One poll after the debate found Stewart again to be the winner, but a second found Johnson ahead.

The third MP ballot on 19 June saw the top three remain the same (Johnson, Hunt, Gove). Stewart was the only candidate to lose votes compared to the previous round, down ten to come last, and was thus eliminated.

The fourth and fifth MP ballots were on 20 June. In the fourth ballot, Javid was eliminated, while Gove narrowly overtook Hunt for second place. The fifth ballot to produce a final candidate pairing eliminated Gove, who received two votes fewer than Hunt. There were questions raised as to whether the Johnson campaign encouraged some supporters to vote for Hunt instead in order to knock Gove out of the leadership, given the poor personal relationship between Johnson and Gove since the 2016 leadership election.

=== Final two ===
Logos used by the final two candidates

Johnson and Hunt, the final two candidates, were to be put to a vote of about 160,000 Conservative members, with the result to be announced in the week of 22 July.

In the early hours of 21 June, police were called to Johnson's home after neighbours heard an altercation between him and his girlfriend Carrie Symonds. The police attended and subsequently stated they found no need for police action.

A poll conducted on Saturday 22 June showed support for Johnson had fallen sharply following the incident. His eight-point lead earlier in the week had fallen to three points behind Hunt by Saturday morning. Among Tory voters, when asked who would make the best prime minister, Johnson's lead had fallen from 27% to 11% in the same period.

The first of a series of hustings took place in Birmingham on 22 June and was chaired by Iain Dale. During the hustings, Johnson repeatedly refused to answer questions about alleged altercation that took place between himself and Symonds. He claimed that the audience of Conservative members wanted to know "what my plans are for my country and for the party. I don't think they want to hear about that kind of thing."

On the evening of 22 June, The Observer published evidence suggesting close links between Johnson and Steve Bannon. The video evidence, in which Bannon discussed how he helped Johnson craft the first speech after his resignation as foreign secretary, contradicted Johnson's previous denials of an association with Bannon.

== Candidates ==
=== Nominated ===
The following ten MPs were nominated on 10 June. Each candidate needed the nomination of at least eight MPs, but only the proposer and seconder were made public.

Candidate	Constituency	Announced	Most recent position (at time of contest)	Proposer and seconder
Michael Gove	Surrey Heath (since 2005)	26 May 2019	Secretary of State for Environment, Food and Rural Affairs (2017–2019)	George Eustice and Nicky Morgan
Matt Hancock	West Suffolk (since 2010)	25 May 2019	Secretary of State for Health and Social Care (2018–2021)	Damian Green and Tracey Crouch
Mark Harper	Forest of Dean (since 2005)	30 May 2019	Government Chief Whip (2015–2016)	Jackie Doyle-Price and Steve Double
Jeremy Hunt	South West Surrey (since 2005)	24 May 2019	Foreign Secretary (2018–2019)	Liam Fox and Patrick McLoughlin
Sajid Javid	Bromsgrove (since 2010)	27 May 2019	Home Secretary (2018–2019)	Robert Halfon and Victoria Atkins
Boris Johnson	Uxbridge and South Ruislip (since 2015)	16 May 2019	Foreign Secretary (2016–2018)	Liz Truss and Ben Wallace
Andrea Leadsom	South Northamptonshire (since 2010)	25 May 2019	Leader of the House of Commons (2017–2019)	Chris Heaton-Harris and Heather Wheeler
Esther McVey	Tatton (since 2017)	9 May 2019	Secretary of State for Work and Pensions from January to November 2018	Gary Streeter and Ben Bradley
Dominic Raab	Esher and Walton (since 2010)	25 May 2019	Secretary of State for Exiting the European Union from July to November 2018	David Davis and Maria Miller
Rory Stewart	Penrith and The Border (since 2010)	2 May 2019	Secretary of State for International Development from 2019	David Gauke and Victoria Prentis

=== Withdrew ===
The following MPs announced that they would seek the leadership of the Conservative Party but subsequently did not stand, or withdrew from the race, due to insufficient support or other reasons:

- James Cleverly, Brexit minister (endorsed Johnson)
- Sam Gyimah, former universities minister
- Kit Malthouse, housing minister (endorsed Johnson)

=== Publicly expressed interest ===
The following MPs publicly expressed interest in the leadership of the Conservative Party but subsequently declined to stand:

- Steve Baker, deputy chair of the European Research Group (endorsed Johnson)
- Graham Brady, chairman of the 1922 Committee
- David Davis, former Brexit secretary (endorsed Raab)
- Tobias Ellwood, veterans minister (endorsed Hancock and Stewart)
- Liam Fox, international trade secretary (endorsed Hunt)
- George Freeman, former life sciences minister (endorsed Hancock, Javid, Gove and Johnson)
- Justine Greening, former education secretary
- Philip Hammond, chancellor of the Exchequer
- Damian Hinds, education secretary (endorsed Gove)
- David Lidington, chancellor of the Duchy of Lancaster (endorsed Hancock then Stewart)
- Johnny Mercer, MP for Plymouth Moor View (endorsed Johnson)
- Penny Mordaunt, defence secretary (endorsed Hunt)
- Nicky Morgan, chair of the Treasury Select Committee (endorsed Gove)
- Jesse Norman, financial secretary to the Treasury (endorsed Johnson)
- Priti Patel, former international development secretary (endorsed Johnson)
- Jacob Rees-Mogg, chair of the European Research Group (endorsed Johnson)
- Amber Rudd, work and pensions secretary (endorsed Hunt)
- Liz Truss, chief secretary to the Treasury (endorsed Johnson)

=== Declined ===
The following MPs were reported by the media as potential candidates for the leadership of the Conservative Party but subsequently declined to stand:

- Bim Afolami, MP for Hitchin and Harpenden (endorsed Hancock, then Johnson)
- Victoria Atkins, crime minister (endorsed Javid)
- Kemi Badenoch, MP for Saffron Walden (endorsed Gove)
- Damian Collins, chair of the Culture, Media and Sport Select Committee (endorsed Johnson)
- Geoffrey Cox, Attorney General for England and Wales (endorsed Johnson)
- Oliver Dowden, parliamentary secretary for the Cabinet Office (endorsed Johnson)
- Alan Duncan, foreign minister (endorsed Hunt)
- Iain Duncan Smith, former leader of the Conservative Party (endorsed Johnson)
- Michael Fallon, former defence secretary (endorsed Johnson)
- David Gauke, justice secretary (endorsed Stewart)
- Damian Green, former first secretary of state (endorsed Hancock, then Johnson)
- Jo Johnson, former transport and London minister (endorsed Johnson)
- Phillip Lee, former justice minister (endorsed Gyimah, then Stewart)
- Brandon Lewis, chairman of the Conservative Party
- Rishi Sunak, housing minister (endorsed Johnson)
- Gavin Williamson, defence secretary (endorsed Johnson)

== Timeline ==
Candidate status
Candidate on membership ballot
Candidate eliminated during MP ballots
Candidate withdrew
Events
Theresa May announces resignation
Theresa May resigns as Conservative leader
Nominations close
MP ballot
Postal ballots distributed to party members
Final leadership hustings
Results announced

=== December–April ===
- 12 December: Conservative MPs vote against a motion of no confidence in May's leadership, 200 to 117. May also announces that she will not lead the Conservative Party into the next general election.
- 15 January: The May government loses the first "meaningful vote" on Brexit by 432 to 202, the largest defeat for a sitting government in modern history.
- 16 January: The House of Commons vote against a motion of no confidence, 325 to 306, moved by the leader of the Opposition Jeremy Corbyn.
- 12 March: The government loses the second "meaningful vote" by 391 to 242.
- 27 March: Theresa May announces she will resign before the next phase of negotiations if the Brexit withdrawal agreement is approved by MPs on 29 March.
- 29 March: The government loses the third "meaningful vote" by 344 to 286.

=== May ===
- 2 May:
  - The Conservatives lose more than 1,300 council seats and control of 44 councils in United Kingdom local elections.
  - Rory Stewart announces his intention to contest the leadership of the Conservative Party after Theresa May steps down.
- 9 May: Esther McVey announces her intention to contest the leadership of the Conservative Party.
- 16 May: Boris Johnson announces his intention to contest the leadership of the Conservative Party.
- 23 May: European Parliament elections are held in the United Kingdom.
- 24 May:
  - Theresa May reveals that she will resign as party leader on 7 June, and subsequently as prime minister when a new leader is elected.
  - Jeremy Hunt announces his candidacy for the leadership election.
- 25 May: Matt Hancock, Dominic Raab and Andrea Leadsom announce their candidacies.
- 26 May:
  - Michael Gove announces his candidacy.
  - Results of the European Parliament election are released, showing the Conservatives placing fifth nationally and losing fifteen of nineteen seats.
- 27 May: Sajid Javid and Kit Malthouse announce their candidacies.
- 29 May: James Cleverly announces his candidacy.
- 30 May: Mark Harper announces his candidacy.

=== June ===
- 2 June: Sam Gyimah announces his candidacy.
- 4 June:
  - Cleverly and Malthouse withdraw their candidacies.
  - The party board backs a 1922 Committee proposal to change the candidacy rules, requiring candidates to be supported by a greater number of MPs before being nominated.
- 7 June: Theresa May's resignation as leader of the Conservative Party takes effect.
- 10 June:
  - 10:00 – Nominations for candidates open.
  - 17:00 – Nominations close, and the full list of final candidates for the leadership was announced by the 1922 Committee half an hour later.
  - Gyimah withdraws his candidacy.
- 11–12 June: The 1922 Committee hosts a two-day-long forum, during which the candidates are questioned on their leadership manifestos by an audience of MPs.
- 13 June: First MP ballot takes place. Harper, Leadsom and McVey fail to meet the threshold for entering the second round and are eliminated.
- 14 June: Hancock withdraws.
- 16 June: Channel 4 televises a debate between the candidates, Johnson declines the invitation to attend.
- 18 June:
  - Second MP ballot takes place. Raab fails to make the threshold for the third round and is eliminated.
  - BBC One televises a debate between candidates remaining after the results of the second ballot.
- 19 June: Third MP ballot takes place. Stewart receives the fewest votes and is eliminated.
- 20 June:
  - Fourth MP ballot takes place. Javid receives the fewest votes and is eliminated.
  - Fifth MP ballot takes place. Gove receives the fewest votes and is eliminated.
- 22 June: First public hustings between Hunt and Johnson takes place at the ICC in Birmingham.
- 24 June: Sky News announces that it will cancel the debate planned to take place between Hunt and Johnson on 25 June, unless Johnson accepts the broadcaster's invitation.

=== July ===
- 6–8 July: Conservative Party members receive postal ballots, with some receiving more than one ballot paper.
- 9 July: ITV televises a head-to-head debate between the final two candidates.
- 12 July: BBC News televises one-on-one interviews by Andrew Neil with the final two candidates.
- 17 July: Final public hustings between Hunt and Johnson takes place at the ExCeL in East London.
- 22 July: 17:00 – Ballot closes.
- 23 July: Result of the postal ballot announced at the Queen Elizabeth II Centre in Westminster. Johnson declared the new Leader of the Conservative Party.
- 24 July:
  - Theresa May resigns as prime minister, after taking her final session of Prime Minister's Questions.
  - Boris Johnson is appointed prime minister by Queen Elizabeth II.

== Public hustings ==
Following the fifth ballot of Conservative MPs on 20 June, the final two candidates, Jeremy Hunt and Boris Johnson, were invited to take place in a series of hustings organised by the party. Each of the sixteen events was held in a different region of the country. A digital hustings was held on 26 June, moderated by Hannah Vaughan Jones and livestreamed on social media (through Periscope).

Date	Moderator	Region	Venue	Map
22 June 2019	Iain Dale	West Midlands	International Convention Centre, Birmingham	2019 Conservative Party leadership election is located in the United Kingdom
27 June 2019	Hannah Vaughan Jones	South (Central)	Pavilion Theatre, Bournemouth	2019 Conservative Party leadership election is located in the United Kingdom
28 June 2019	Iain Dale	South West	Sandy Park, Exeter	2019 Conservative Party leadership election is located in the United Kingdom
29 June 2019	Iain Dale	Lakes & Borders	Carlisle Racecourse, Carlisle	2019 Conservative Party leadership election is located in the United Kingdom
29 June 2019	Iain Dale	North West	Manchester Central, Manchester	2019 Conservative Party leadership election is located in the United Kingdom
2 July 2019	Iain Dale	Northern Ireland	Culloden Estate, Belfast	2019 Conservative Party leadership election is located in the United Kingdom
4 July 2019	Hannah Vaughan Jones	Yorkshire & Humber	Barbican Centre, York	2019 Conservative Party leadership election is located in the United Kingdom
5 July 2019	Hannah Vaughan Jones	North East	Darlington Hippodrome, Darlington	2019 Conservative Party leadership election is located in the United Kingdom
5 July 2019	Colin Mackay	Scotland	Perth Concert Hall, Perth	2019 Conservative Party leadership election is located in the United Kingdom
6 July 2019	Iain Dale	East Midlands	Nottingham Belfry, Nottingham	2019 Conservative Party leadership election is located in the United Kingdom
6 July 2019	Hannah Vaughan Jones	Wales	All Nations Centre, Cardiff	2019 Conservative Party leadership election is located in the United Kingdom
11 July 2019	Hannah Vaughan Jones	South East	Clive Emson Conference Centre, Maidstone	2019 Conservative Party leadership election is located in the United Kingdom
12 July 2019	Iain Dale	Gloucestershire	Cheltenham Racecourse, Cheltenham	2019 Conservative Party leadership election is located in the United Kingdom
13 July 2019	Iain Dale	East Anglia	Woodlands Event Centre, Wyboston	2019 Conservative Party leadership election is located in the United Kingdom
13 July 2019	Iain Dale	Eastern	Five Lakes Golf Resort, Colchester	2019 Conservative Party leadership election is located in the United Kingdom
17 July 2019	Iain Dale	London	ExCeL, Custom House	2019 Conservative Party leadership election is located in the United Kingdom

== Candidate debates ==
On 28 May, the BBC announced plans to hold televised leadership debates for the candidates that would take place once nominations had closed. All candidates who had not yet been eliminated would be invited to take part in a hustings debate chaired by Emily Maitlis, followed by a Question Time special with Fiona Bruce. The final two candidates would then have a one-to-one interview with Andrew Neil, which aired on 12 July. On the same day, Sky News also announced plans for a head-to-head leadership debate between the final two candidates in front of an audience of Conservative Party members.

The BBC confirmed that the first debate would be broadcast under the title Our Next Prime Minister at 20:00 on 18 June 2019 on BBC One, two hours after the second ballot. Members of the public, speaking live from BBC studios around the UK, were to ask questions of the candidates. Channel 4 broadcast a 90-minute debate between the candidates on 16 June, hosted by Krishnan Guru-Murthy.

ITV announced on 20 June that they would be holding a head-to-head debate between Hunt and Johnson on 9 July, hosted by Julie Etchingham. The debate also aired in the Republic of Ireland on Virgin Media One.

On 21 June, Sky News presenter Kay Burley announced that their debate was planned to take place on 25 June, but Johnson was not willing to attend. On 24 June, Sky stated the event would not go ahead without Johnson, and would have to be cancelled. The channel also announced that both candidates had been invited to a rescheduled debate on 1 July. Johnson once again declined to attend; Sky News announced that it would hold an interview with Hunt on 1 July, Johnson being invited to be similarly interviewed at another date.

On 10 July, the BBC announced that the Question Time special was "unlikely to go ahead" on 16 July, due to Johnson's team expressing concerns about the format.

No.	Date and time	Location	Programme	Broadcaster	Presenter(s)	Viewers (millions)	Candidates					
P Participant A Absent invitee O Out of race (eliminated or withdrawn) N No debate							Gove	Hunt	Javid	Johnson	Raab	Stewart
Prior to the final ballot of Conservative MPs
1	16 June 2019; 18:30	BT Sport Studios, Hackney Wick, London	Live: Britain's Next PM	Channel 4	Krishnan Guru-Murthy	1.47	P	P	P	A	P	P
2	18 June 2019; 20:00	New Broadcasting House, Marylebone, London	Our Next Prime Minister	BBC One	Emily Maitlis	5.49	P	P	P	P	O	P
Following the final ballot of Conservative MPs
3	25 June 2019 (cancelled)	~~Sky Studios,~~; ~~Isleworth, London~~	~~The Battle for Number 10~~	~~Sky News~~	~~Kay Burley~~	N/A	O	N	O	N	O	O
4	9 July 2019; 20:00	dock10 studios, Salford, Greater Manchester	Britain's Next Prime Minister: The ITV Debate	ITV	Julie Etchingham	4.7	O	P	O	P	O	O
4	15 July 2019; 19:00	The News Building, Southwark, London	Hunt v Boris: The Final Showdown	talkRADIO, The Sun (online)	Tom Newton Dunn	N/A	O	P	O	P	O	O
5	16 July 2019 (cancelled)	~~N/A~~	~~Question Time special~~	~~BBC~~	~~Fiona Bruce~~	N/A	O	N	O	N	O	O

=== Reaction ===
Date(s) administered	Poll source	Sample size	Gove	Hunt	Javid	Johnson	Raab	Stewart	Don't Know
Channel 4: Live: Britain's Next PM
16–18 June 2019	Opinium	610	6%	18%	9%	—N/a	10%	33%	24%
BBC One: Our Next Prime Minister
18–19 June 2019	YouGov	2,534	9%	14%	5%	21%	Elim.	35%	16%
18–19 June 2019	Opinium	700	8%	14%	9%	22%	Elim.	21%	26%

== Opinion polling ==
Date(s) administered	Poll source	Sample size	Jeremy Hunt	Boris Johnson	Not Sure
10–12 July 2019	Opinium	1,141 Conservative Party voters	29%	53%	18%
3–5 July 2019	Opinium	2,002 British voters	18%	27%	55%
3–5 July 2019	Opinium	760 2017 Conservative voters	28%	49%	24%
1–5 July 2019	YouGov	907 Conservative Party members	26%	74%	—N/a
22 June 2019	ComRes	Conservative Party councillors	39%	61%	—N/a
21 June 2019	YouGov	907 Conservative Party members	26%	74%	—N/a
16 May 2019	YouGov	858 Conservative Party members	33%	67%	—N/a

== Results ==
Following each ballot of Conservative MPs, the candidate with the fewest votes is eliminated. A new rule was introduced in 2019 due to the number of candidates: In the first ballot, held on 13 June 2019, candidates also needed to pass a threshold of 17 votes to avoid elimination. In the second ballot, held on 18 June, candidates needed to pass a threshold of 33 votes to avoid elimination.

Candidate	First ballot: 13 June 2019		Second ballot: 18 June 2019			Third ballot: 19 June 2019			Fourth ballot: 20 June 2019			Fifth ballot: 20 June 2019			Members' vote: 6-22 July 2019		
Candidate	Votes	%	Votes	±	%	Votes	±	%	Votes	±	%	Votes	±	%	Votes	%	% Votes Cast
Boris Johnson	114	36.4	126	▲12	40.3	143	▲17	45.7	157	▲14	50.2	160	▲3	51.1	92,153	57.8	66.4
Jeremy Hunt	43	13.7	46	▲3	14.7	54	▲8	17.3	59	▲5	18.8	77	▲18	24.6	46,656	29.3	33.6
Michael Gove	37	11.8	41	▲4	13.1	51	▲10	16.3	61	▲10	19.5	75	▲14	24.0	Eliminated		
Sajid Javid	23	7.3	33	▲10	10.5	38	▲5	12.1	34	▼4	10.9	Eliminated					
Rory Stewart	19	6.1	37	▲18	11.8	27	▼10	8.6	Eliminated								
Dominic Raab	27	8.6	30	▲3	9.6	Eliminated											
Matt Hancock	20	6.4	Withdrew														
Andrea Leadsom	11	3.5	Eliminated														
Mark Harper	10	3.2	Eliminated														
Esther McVey	9	2.9	Eliminated														
Votes cast (Note: Due to rounding errors the sum of percentages may deviate.)	313	100.0	313	Steady	100.0	313	Steady	100.0	313	Steady	100.0	313	Steady	100.0	139,318	87.4	100
Spoilt ballots	0	0.0	0	Steady	0.0	0	Steady	0.0	2	▲2	0.6	1	▼1	0.3	509	0.3	
Abstentions	0	0	0	Steady	0	0	Steady	0	0	Steady	0	0	Steady	0	20,085	12.6	
Registered Voters	313	100.0	313	Steady	100.0	313	Steady	100.0	313	Steady	100.0	313	Steady	100.0	159,403	100.0	

View source data.

=== Domestic and international reaction ===
The result was announced on 23 July, with Boris Johnson chosen by party members to succeed May. Johnson consequently also succeeded May as Prime Minister of the United Kingdom the following day. Outgoing party leader and British prime minister Theresa May pledged her full support for her successor and called for the rest of the party to unite behind Johnson.

In anticipation of Johnson's election, a number of ministers had announced that they would resign from office, due to his willingness to leave the EU without a deal. On 22 July, Foreign Minister Alan Duncan tendered his resignation; prior to the leadership election result announced on the following day, Education Minister Anne Milton stood down from her post, citing "grave concerns" over the new Prime Minister's Brexit policies. On 24 July, chancellor Philip Hammond, justice secretary David Gauke and international development secretary Rory Stewart all resigned from the May government, just hours before Boris Johnson became prime minister. This was done in protest against Johnson's position on withdrawing from the European Union, and in anticipation of their dismissal from office during the formation of a new cabinet. DUP leader Arlene Foster welcomed Johnson's election, reaffirming the continuity of the Conservative–DUP agreement.

Johnson's election was criticised by leaders of opposition parties, including Labour's Jeremy Corbyn, who restated his call for a new general election, the Scottish National Party's Commons leader Ian Blackford and the Liberal Democrats' Jo Swinson. Devolved administrations expressed a similar tone; Scotland's Nicola Sturgeon questioned his "lack of principle", and pledged to work with other parties to prevent the UK leaving the EU without a deal. Welsh first minister Mark Drakeford urged "seriousness" and "maturity", and also called for a further referendum if Johnson was unable to pass a deal that commanded the support of the House of Commons.

Johnson's election also caused concern in financial markets, with Moody's and Goldman Sachs both warning that the election of Boris Johnson would increase the likelihood of the exit of Britain from the European Union without a deal. Dame Carolyn Fairbairn, the director-general of the CBI reacted to the result by urging the new prime minister to secure a deal, to "unlock new investment and confidence in factories and boardrooms across the country".

== See also ==
- 2019 European Parliament election in the United Kingdom
- 2019 United Kingdom general election
- 2019 Liberal Democrats leadership election
- February 2020 Scottish Conservatives leadership election
- August 2020 Scottish Conservatives leadership election
