= Lewis Vaughan Jones =

Welsh news presenter and journalist

Lewis Vaughan Jones (born 1981) is a Welsh journalist and television news presenter, working at BBC News.

== Background ==
Vaughan Jones grew up in Penarth, Vale of Glamorgan, where he attended Stanwell School. He studied Philosophy, Politics and Economics at Keble College of Oxford University.

== Career ==
Vaughan Jones began his career at the Welsh Government.

He began working in television at ITV Wales in 2005. He then worked at ITN as a journalist covering a range of issues. He became an acting health correspondent at ITV News in 2014. However, by April 2015, Vaughan Jones was a political correspondent at ITV News.

As of 2017, Vaughan Jones was an occasional presenter of ITV News bulletins. As of 2018, Vaughan Jones was a newsreader at ITN and the BBC. By April 2019, he worked at BBC News only, presenting on both the BBC News and BBC World News channels. He still appears regularly on BBC News as a news presenter. Since 2024, he has been a relief presenter for the BBC News at One. On 12 April 2026, he made his debut presenting BBC Breakfast.

== Personal life ==
Vaughan Jones began wearing a hearing aid on air in 2018, after suddenly becoming unable to hear through his left ear, following him suffering from the common cold. He now has an implant, called a Bone Anchored Hearing Aid.

Vaughan Jones married Hannah Vaughan Jones, a former news presenter and journalist at CNN International and Sky News, in 2015. The couple live in Twickenham, south-west London. Their son was born on 10 December 2019, after 15 rounds of IVF.
