= Opinion polling for the 2019 Conservative Party leadership election =

Polling for a British political party election

Opinion polling for the 2019 Conservative Party leadership election had taken place since 2017. Conservative Party Leader and Prime Minister Theresa May announced on 24 May 2019 that she would resign as leader on 7 June 2019, officially announcing the start of the 2019 Conservative Party leadership election.

== Polling via organisations ==
Jeremy Hunt vs. Boris Johnson

| Date(s) administered | Poll source | Sample size | Jeremy Hunt | Boris Johnson | Not Sure |
|---|---|---|---|---|---|
| 10–12 July 2019 | Opinium | 1,141 Conservative Party voters | 29% | 53% | 18% |
| 3–5 July 2019 | Opinium | 2,002 British voters | 18% | 27% | 55% |
| 3–5 July 2019 | Opinium | 760 2017 Conservative voters | 28% | 49% | 24% |
| 1–5 July 2019 | YouGov | 907 Conservative Party members | 26% | 74% | —N/a |
| 22 June 2019 | ComRes | Conservative Party councillors | 39% | 61% | —N/a |
| 21 June 2019 | YouGov | 907 Conservative Party members | 26% | 74% | —N/a |
| 16 May 2019 | YouGov | 858 Conservative Party members | 33% | 67% | —N/a |

All candidates

| Date(s) administered | Poll source | Sample size | Jeremy Hunt | Boris Johnson | Michael Gove | Matt Hancock | Sajid Javid | Andrea Leadsom | Esther McVey | Dominic Raab | Rory Stewart | Don't Know | Others |
|---|---|---|---|---|---|---|---|---|---|---|---|---|---|
| 13–20 June 2019 | Five ballots are held among Conservative MPs. Boris Johnson and Jeremy Hunt advance to the members' vote. | | | | | | | | | | | | |
| 4-10 June 2019 | Sam Gyimah, James Cleverly and Kit Malthouse announce they are pulling out of the leadership race ahead of the vote | | | | | | | | | | | | |
| 3–4 June 2019 | YouGov | 1,755 British adults | 4% | 19% | 5% | 1% | 6% | 4% | 2% | 3% | 7% | 26% | 3% Others Sam Gyimah 2% James Cleverly 1% Mark Harper 0% Kit Malthouse 0% |
| 2 June 2019 | Sam Gyimah announces he will run for the leadership | | | | | | | | | | | | |
| 30 May 2019 | Mark Harper announces he will run for the leadership | | | | | | | | | | | | |
| 29 May 2019 | James Cleverly announces he will run for the leadership | | | | | | | | | | | | |
| 28–30 May 2019 | Opinium | 2,005 British adults | 5% | 19% | 6% | 1% | 5% | 4% | 2% | 5% | 5% | 4% | 35% Others Philip Hammond 5% Steve Baker 1% Priti Patel 1% Liz Truss 0% Graham Brady 0% James Cleverly 0% Kit Malthouse 0% Jesse Norman 0% |
| 27 May 2019 | Sajid Javid and Kit Malthouse announce they will run for the leadership | | | | | | | | | | | | |
| 26 May 2019 | Andrea Leadsom and Michael Gove announce they will run for the leadership | | | | | | | | | | | | |
| 25 May 2019 | Matt Hancock and Dominic Raab announce they will run for the leadership | | | | | | | | | | | | |
| 22–24 May 2019 | Survation | 2,029 British adults | 5% | 27% | 5% | 2% | 9% | 4% | 2% | 2% | 2% | 41% | Others Penny Mordaunt 2% Liz Truss 0% |
| 24 May 2019 | Jeremy Hunt announces he will run for the leadership | | | | | | | | | | | | |
| 24 May 2019 | Theresa May announces her intention to step down as Conservative Leader and Prime Minister | | | | | | | | | | | | |
| 23–24 May 2019 | YouGov | 1,586 British adults | 4% | 21% | 4% | 1% | 10% | 6% | —N/a | 2% | 2% | 21% | 26% Others Penny Mordaunt 2% |
| 17 May 2019 | Boris Johnson announces he will run for the leadership | | | | | | | | | | | | |
| 10–16 May 2019 | YouGov/The Times | 858 Conservative members | 8% | 39% | 9% | 1% | 9% | 5% | —N/a | 13% | 4% | | Others Penny Mordaunt 5% |
| 9 May 2019 | Esther McVey announces she will run for the leadership | | | | | | | | | | | | |
| 7–10 May 2019 | BMG Research | 1,541 British adults | 2% | 11% | 3% | —N/a | 4% | 2% | —N/a | 1% | —N/a | 27% | 28% Others Jacob Rees-Mogg 6% Philip Hammond 4% Ruth Davidson 4% David Davis 4% Amber Rudd 3% Penny Mordaunt 1%Priti Patel 1% Nicky Morgan 0% Andy Street 0% |
| 5 May 2019 | Rory Stewart announces he will run for the leadership | | | | | | | | | | | | |
| 9–12 Apr 2019 | Opinium | 2,007 British adults | 2% | 12% | 3% | 1% | 4% | 2% | —N/a | 2% | —N/a | 26% | 31% Others David Davis 4% Philip Hammond 3% Amber Rudd 3% Gavin Williamson 1% |
| 4–8 Apr 2019 | Kantar | 1,178 British adults | 2% | 10% | 3% | —N/a | 0% | 0% | —N/a | 2% | —N/a | 69% | 1% Others Jacob Rees-Mogg 1% David Davis 0% Philip Hammond 0% Amber Rudd 0% |
| 28–30 Mar 2019 | Deltapoll | 1,010 British adults | 4% | 15% | 5% | 1% | 6% | 1% | —N/a | 2% | —N/a | 50% | 40% Others Jacob Rees-Mogg 4% Amber Rudd 4% David Davis 3% David Lidington 2% Liz Truss 1% Mark Harper 1% Gavin Williamson 0% Geoffrey Cox 0% |
| 28–29 Mar 2019 | Opinium | 2,008 British adults | 2% | 11% | 4% | —N/a | 4% | 1% | —N/a | 3% | —N/a | 27% | 29% Others Jacob Rees-Mogg 7% Philip Hammond 4% Amber Rudd 4% David Davis 3% Gavin Williamson 1% |
| 16 Mar 2019 | Survation | 1,007 British adults | 8% | 16% | 5% | —N/a | 9% | —N/a | —N/a | 3% | —N/a | 26% | 29% Others Amber Rudd 5% Liz Truss 1% |
| 14–15 Mar 2019 | YouGov/People's Vote | 1,823 British adults | 3% | 13% | —N/a | 0% | 5% | 2% | 1% | 2% | —N/a | 32% | 40% |
| 14-15 Mar 2019 | YouGov | 1,756 British adults | 3% | 13% | 4% | —N/a | 8% | —N/a | —N/a | 2% | —N/a | 27% | 20% Others Jacob Rees-Mogg 9% Amber Rudd 9% David Davis 4% |
| 12-15 Mar 2019 | Opinium | 2,008 British adults | 2% | 10% | 3% | —N/a | 4% | 2% | —N/a | 2% | —N/a | 29% | 28% Others Jacob Rees-Mogg 8% Philip Hammond 4% David Davis 3% Amber Rudd 3% Gavin Williamson 2% |
| 21–22 Feb 2019 | Deltapoll | 1,027 British adults | 5% | 14% | 4% | —N/a | 9% | —N/a | —N/a | 3% | —N/a | 41% | 8% Others Jacob Rees-Mogg 7% Amber Rudd 5% David Davis 4% |
2019
| 5 Dec 2018 | Survation | 1,053 British adults | 6% | 17% | 6% | —N/a | 5% | —N/a | —N/a | —N/a | —N/a | 44% | 2% Others Jacob Rees-Mogg 8% David Davis 5% Amber Rudd 4% Penny Mordaunt 2% |
| 28–29 Sep 2018 | BMG Research/HuffPost UK | 1,203 British adults | —N/a | 20% | 2% | —N/a | 5% | —N/a | —N/a | —N/a | —N/a | 26% | 15% Others Jacob Rees-Mogg 7% Ruth Davidson 6% Philip Hammond 4% David Davis 3% Amber Rudd 2% |
| 19–20 Jul 2018 | YouGov/The Times | 1,668 British adults | 2% | 15% | 1% | —N/a | 4% | —N/a | —N/a | —N/a | —N/a | 25% | 31% Others Jacob Rees-Mogg 12% Ruth Davidson 8% Penny Mordaunt 1% Gavin Williamson 1% |
| 14 Jul 2018 | Opinium/Observer | 2,005 British adults | 4% | 12% | 3% | —N/a | —N/a | 2% | —N/a | —N/a | —N/a | 23% | 25% Others Jacob Rees-Mogg 10% Penny Mordaunt 7% Philip Hammond 5% |
| 5–8 Jul 2018 | YouGov | 966 Conservative members | 4% | 11% | 11% | —N/a | 17% | —N/a | —N/a | —N/a | —N/a | 5% | Others Jacob Rees-Mogg 29% Ruth Davidson 20% Penny Mordaunt 2% Gavin Williamson 1% |
2018
| 20–27 Sep 2017 | YouGov | 927 Conservative members | —N/a | 23% | —N/a | —N/a | 1% | —N/a | —N/a | 2% | —N/a | 26% | Others Amber Rudd 5% Priti Patel 2% Damian Green 1% Liam Fox 1% Tom Tugendhat 1% Someone else 6% |
| 23 September 2017 | Survation/Mail on Sunday | 1,174 British adults | —N/a | 21% | 3% | —N/a | —N/a | —N/a | —N/a | —N/a | —N/a | 27% | 24% Others Jacob Rees-Mogg 6% David Davis 5% Amber Rudd 6% Philip Hammond 7% |
| 19–22 Sep 2017 | Opinium/Observer | 1,268 British voters | 3% | 23% | 2% | —N/a | 5% | —N/a | —N/a | —N/a | —N/a | 15% | 1% Others Ruth Davidson 17% David Davis 10% Jacob Rees-Mogg 8% Amber Rudd 8% Philip Hammond 7% |
| 31 Aug – 1 September 2017 | Survation/Mail on Sunday | 1,174 British adults | —N/a | 21% | 3% | —N/a | —N/a | —N/a | —N/a | —N/a | —N/a | 25% | 29% Others David Davis 5% Jacob Rees-Mogg 6% Philip Hammond 7% Ruth Davidson 5% Amber Rudd 6% |
| 21 Jun–11 Jul 2017 | YouGov | 1,002 Conservative members | —N/a | 17% | —N/a | —N/a | —N/a | 1% | —N/a | —N/a | —N/a | 26% | Others David Davis 21% Jacob Rees-Mogg 6% Philip Hammond 5% Amber Rudd 4% Liam Fox 1% |
2017

== Head to head polling ==
Davis vs Rudd

| Date(s) administered | Poll source | Sample size | David Davis | Amber Rudd | Would not vote | Don't Know |
|---|---|---|---|---|---|---|
| 20–27 September 2017 | YouGov | 927 Conservative members | 51% | 32% | 8% | 9% |

Johnson head-to-heads

| Date(s) administered | Poll source | Sample size | Boris Johnson | Michael Gove | Jeremy Hunt | Sajid Javid | Penny Mordaunt | Dominic Raab | Matt Hancock | Rory Stewart | Andrea Leadsom |
|---|---|---|---|---|---|---|---|---|---|---|---|
| 10–16 May 2019 | YouGov/The Times | 858 Conservative members | 66% | 34% | —N/a | —N/a | —N/a | —N/a | —N/a | —N/a | —N/a |
| 10–16 May 2019 | YouGov/The Times | 858 Conservative members | 67% | —N/a | 33% | —N/a | —N/a | —N/a | —N/a | —N/a | —N/a |
| 10–16 May 2019 | YouGov/The Times | 858 Conservative members | 66% | —N/a | —N/a | 34% | —N/a | —N/a | —N/a | —N/a | —N/a |
| 10–16 May 2019 | YouGov/The Times | 858 Conservative members | 69% | —N/a | —N/a | —N/a | 31% | —N/a | —N/a | —N/a | —N/a |
| 10–16 May 2019 | YouGov/The Times | 858 Conservative members | 59% | —N/a | —N/a | —N/a | —N/a | 41% | —N/a | —N/a | —N/a |
| 10–16 May 2019 | YouGov/The Times | 858 Conservative members | 74% | —N/a | —N/a | —N/a | —N/a | —N/a | 26% | —N/a | —N/a |
| 10–16 May 2019 | YouGov/The Times | 858 Conservative members | 75% | —N/a | —N/a | —N/a | —N/a | —N/a | —N/a | 25% | —N/a |
| 10–16 May 2019 | YouGov/The Times | 858 Conservative members | 70% | —N/a | —N/a | —N/a | —N/a | —N/a | —N/a | —N/a | 30% |
| 5–8 Jul 2018 | YouGov | 966 Conservative members | 45% | 55% | —N/a | —N/a | —N/a | —N/a | —N/a | —N/a | —N/a |
| 5–8 Jul 2018 | YouGov | 966 Conservative members | 56% | —N/a | 44% | —N/a | —N/a | —N/a | —N/a | —N/a | —N/a |
| 5–8 Jul 2018 | YouGov | 966 Conservative members | 45% | —N/a | —N/a | 55% | —N/a | —N/a | —N/a | —N/a | —N/a |
| 5–8 Jul 2018 | YouGov | 966 Conservative members | 59% | —N/a | —N/a | —N/a | 41% | —N/a | —N/a | —N/a | —N/a |

Gove head-to-heads

| Date(s) administered | Poll source | Sample size | Michael Gove | Jeremy Hunt | Sajid Javid | Penny Mordaunt | Dominic Raab | Matt Hancock | Rory Stewart | Andrea Leadsom |
|---|---|---|---|---|---|---|---|---|---|---|
| 10–16 May 2019 | YouGov/The Times | 858 Conservative members | 50% | 50% | —N/a | —N/a | —N/a | —N/a | —N/a | —N/a |
| 10–16 May 2019 | YouGov/The Times | 858 Conservative members | 51% | —N/a | 49% | —N/a | —N/a | —N/a | —N/a | —N/a |
| 10–16 May 2019 | YouGov/The Times | 858 Conservative members | 53% | —N/a | —N/a | 47% | —N/a | —N/a | —N/a | —N/a |
| 10–16 May 2019 | YouGov/The Times | 858 Conservative members | 42% | —N/a | —N/a | —N/a | 58% | —N/a | —N/a | —N/a |
| 10–16 May 2019 | YouGov/The Times | 858 Conservative members | 66% | —N/a | —N/a | —N/a | —N/a | 34% | —N/a | —N/a |
| 10–16 May 2019 | YouGov/The Times | 858 Conservative members | 71% | —N/a | —N/a | —N/a | —N/a | —N/a | 29% | —N/a |
| 10–16 May 2019 | YouGov/The Times | 858 Conservative members | 51% | —N/a | —N/a | —N/a | —N/a | —N/a | —N/a | 49% |
| 5–8 Jul 2018 | YouGov | 966 Conservative members | | | | | | | | |
| 5–8 Jul 2018 | YouGov | 966 Conservative members | 61% | 39% | —N/a | —N/a | —N/a | —N/a | —N/a | —N/a |
| 5–8 Jul 2018 | YouGov | 966 Conservative members | 44% | —N/a | 56% | —N/a | —N/a | —N/a | —N/a | —N/a |
| 5–8 Jul 2018 | YouGov | 966 Conservative members | 66% | —N/a | —N/a | 44% | —N/a | —N/a | —N/a | —N/a |

Javid head-to-heads

| Date(s) administered | Poll source | Sample size | Jeremy Hunt | Sajid Javid | Penny Mordaunt | Dominic Raab | Matt Hancock | Rory Stewart | Andrea Leadsom |
|---|---|---|---|---|---|---|---|---|---|
| 10–16 May 2019 | YouGov/The Times | 858 Conservative members | 49% | 51% | —N/a | —N/a | —N/a | —N/a | —N/a |
| 10–16 May 2019 | YouGov/The Times | 858 Conservative members | —N/a | 51% | 49% | —N/a | —N/a | —N/a | —N/a |
| 10–16 May 2019 | YouGov/The Times | 858 Conservative members | —N/a | 41% | —N/a | 59% | —N/a | —N/a | —N/a |
| 10–16 May 2019 | YouGov/The Times | 858 Conservative members | —N/a | 71% | —N/a | —N/a | 29% | —N/a | —N/a |
| 10–16 May 2019 | YouGov/The Times | 858 Conservative members | —N/a | 74% | —N/a | —N/a | —N/a | 26% | —N/a |
| 10–16 May 2019 | YouGov/The Times | 858 Conservative members | —N/a | 50% | —N/a | —N/a | —N/a | —N/a | 50% |

Stewart head-to-heads

| Date(s) administered | Poll source | Sample size | Jeremy Hunt | Penny Mordaunt | Dominic Raab | Matt Hancock | Rory Stewart | Andrea Leadsom |
|---|---|---|---|---|---|---|---|---|
| 10–16 May 2019 | YouGov/The Times | 858 Conservative members | 74% | —N/a | —N/a | —N/a | 26% | —N/a |
| 10–16 May 2019 | YouGov/The Times | 858 Conservative members | —N/a | —N/a | —N/a | —N/a | 30% | 70% |
| 10–16 May 2019 | YouGov/The Times | 858 Conservative members | —N/a | —N/a | 73% | —N/a | 27% | —N/a |
| 10–16 May 2019 | YouGov/The Times | 858 Conservative members | —N/a | —N/a | —N/a | 62% | 38% | —N/a |
| 10–16 May 2019 | YouGov/The Times | 858 Conservative members | —N/a | 71% | —N/a | —N/a | 29% | —N/a |

Hunt head-to-heads

| Date(s) administered | Poll source | Sample size | Jeremy Hunt | Penny Mordaunt | Dominic Raab | Matt Hancock | Andrea Leadsom |
|---|---|---|---|---|---|---|---|
| 10–16 May 2019 | YouGov/The Times | 858 Conservative members | 53% | 47% | —N/a | —N/a | —N/a |
| 10–16 May 2019 | YouGov/The Times | 858 Conservative members | 41% | —N/a | 59% | —N/a | —N/a |
| 10–16 May 2019 | YouGov/The Times | 858 Conservative members | 71% | —N/a | —N/a | 29% | —N/a |
| 10–16 May 2019 | YouGov/The Times | 858 Conservative members | 49% | —N/a | —N/a | —N/a | 51% |

Leadsom head-to-heads

| Date(s) administered | Poll source | Sample size | Penny Mordaunt | Dominic Raab | Matt Hancock | Andrea Leadsom |
|---|---|---|---|---|---|---|
| 10–16 May 2019 | YouGov/The Times | 858 Conservative members | 49% | —N/a | —N/a | 51% |
| 10–16 May 2019 | YouGov/The Times | 858 Conservative members | —N/a | 64% | —N/a | 36% |
| 10–16 May 2019 | YouGov/The Times | 858 Conservative members | —N/a | —N/a | 33% | 67% |

Raab head-to-heads

| Date(s) administered | Poll source | Sample size | Penny Mordaunt | Dominic Raab | Matt Hancock |
|---|---|---|---|---|---|
| 10–16 May 2019 | YouGov/The Times | 858 Conservative members | 37% | 63% | —N/a |
| 10–16 May 2019 | YouGov/The Times | 858 Conservative members | —N/a | 73% | 27% |

Mordaunt vs Hancock

| Date(s) administered | Poll source | Sample size | Penny Mordaunt | Matt Hancock |
|---|---|---|---|---|
| 10–16 May 2019 | YouGov/The Times | 858 Conservative members | 65% | 35% |

Johnson vs Rudd

| Date(s) administered | Poll source | Sample size | Boris Johnson | Amber Rudd | Would not vote | Don't Know |
|---|---|---|---|---|---|---|
| 20–27 September 2017 | YouGov | 927 Conservative members | 57% | 33% | 5% | 5% |

Davis vs Johnson

| Date(s) administered | Poll source | Sample size | David Davis | Boris Johnson | Would not vote | Don't Know |
|---|---|---|---|---|---|---|
| 20–27 September 2017 | YouGov | 927 Conservative members | 39% | 46% | 9% | 7% |

== Approval ratings of prospective candidates ==
Jeremy Hunt

| Date(s) conducted | Polling organisation/client | Sample size | Question wording | Approve | Disapprove | Neither | Don't know | Net approval |
|---|---|---|---|---|---|---|---|---|
| 18–20 Jun 2019 | Panelbase/The Sunday Times | 248 Scottish Conservative voters | Good Prime Minister/Bad Prime Minister | 30% | 20% | —N/a | 50% | +10% |
| 18–20 Jun 2019 | Panelbase/The Sunday Times | 1,024 Scottish adults | Good Prime Minister/Bad Prime Minister | 15% | 39% | —N/a | 46% | –24% |
| 18–20 Jun 2019 | Opinium | 318 Conservative members | Good Prime Minister/Bad Prime Minister | 61% | 19% | —N/a | 20% | +42% |
| 18–20 Jun 2019 | Opinium | 1,861 British adults | Good Prime Minister/Bad Prime Minister | 35% | 46% | —N/a | 19% | –11% |
| 11–14 Jun 2019 | YouGov | 892 Conservative members | Good Prime Minister/Bad Prime Minister (Note: These surveys used the YouGov question asking: "Thinking about who might become Conservative leader and Prime Minister were Theresa May to resign, do you think each of the following would make a good or bad leader?") | 56% | 37% | 2 | 6% | +19% |
| 9–10 Jun 2019 | YouGov | 552 2017 Conservative voters | Good Prime Minister/Bad Prime Minister | 31% | 36% | 18% | 16% | –5% |
| 9–10 Jun 2019 | YouGov | 252 Conservative voters | Good Prime Minister/Bad Prime Minister | 45% | 22% | 15% | 17% | +23% |
| 9–10 Jun 2019 | YouGov | 1,672 British voters | Good Prime Minister/Bad Prime Minister | 19% | 43% | 24% | 14% | –24% |
| 9 Jun 2019 | Opinium | 660 2017 Conservative voters | Good Prime Minister/Bad Prime Minister | 7% | 15% | —N/a | 78% | –8% |
| 9 Jun 2019 | Opinium | 284 Conservative voters | Good Prime Minister/Bad Prime Minister | 11% | 11% | —N/a | 78% | Tie |
| 9 Jun 2019 | Opinium | 1,688 British voters | Good Prime Minister/Bad Prime Minister | 4% | 23% | —N/a | 77% | –19% |
| 7–9 Jun 2019 | ComRes | 2,017 British voters | Good Prime Minister/Bad Prime Minister (Note: These surveys used the ComRes question asking whether the respondent agrees or disagrees that the candidate "has what it takes to be a good Prime Minister".) | 14% | 44% | —N/a | 41% | –30% |
| 3–4 Jun 2019 | YouGov | 579 2017 Conservative voters | Good Prime Minister/Bad Prime Minister | 26% | 40% | 18% | 15% | –14% |
| 3–4 Jun 2019 | YouGov | 1,755 British voters | Good Prime Minister/Bad Prime Minister | 15% | 46% | 24% | 15% | –31% |
| 23–24 May 2019 | YouGov | 523 2017 Conservative voters | Good Prime Minister/Bad Prime Minister | 22% | 39% | 20% | 20% | –17% |
| 23–24 May 2019 | YouGov | 1,586 British voters | Good Prime Minister/Bad Prime Minister | 12% | 46% | 27% | 15% | –34% |
| 10–16 May 2019 | YouGov | 858 Conservative members | Good leader/Bad leader | 43% | 43% | 10% | 4% | Tie |
| 10–14 Mar 2019 | Ipsos MORI | 222 Conservative supporters | Good Prime Minister/Bad Prime Minister (Note: These surveys used the Ipsos question asking: "On balance, do you agree or disagree that ...has what it takes to be a good prime minister?") | 28% | 41% | —N/a | 31% | –13% |
| 10–14 Mar 2019 | Ipsos MORI | 1,072 British voters | Good Prime Minister/Bad Prime Minister | 19% | 52% | —N/a | 29% | –33% |
| 25–26 Mar 2019 | YouGov/Times RedBox | 2,143 British voters | Good Prime Minister/Bad Prime Minister | 13% | 42% | 29% | 16% | –29% |
| 15–19 Mar 2019 | Ipsos MORI | 124 Conservative Party voters | Satisfied/Dissatisfied (Note: These surveys used the Ipsos question asking if a particular individual would be satisfactory as Conservative leader and Prime Minister.) | 32% | 36% | —N/a | 32% | –4% |
| 14–15 Mar 2019 | YouGov/The Times | 402 Conservative voters | Good leader/Bad leader | 24% | 40% | 19% | 17% | –16% |
| 14–15 Mar 2019 | YouGov/The Times | 579 2017 Conservative voters | Good leader/Bad leader | 21% | 42% | 18% | 19% | –21% |
| 14–15 Mar 2019 | YouGov/The Times | 1,756 British voters | Good leader/Bad leader | 14% | 46% | 24% | 16% | –32% |
| 14–15 Nov 2018 | YouGov/The Times | 1,671 British voters | Good leader/Bad leader | 14% | 44% | 26% | 16% | –30% |
| 5–8 Jul 2018 | YouGov | Conservative members | Good leader/Bad leader | 38% | 49% | 10% | 4% | –11% |

Sajid Javid

| Date(s) conducted | Polling organisation/client | Sample size | Question wording | Approve | Disapprove | Neither | Don't know | Net approval |
|---|---|---|---|---|---|---|---|---|
| 18–20 Jun 2019 | Panelbase/The Sunday Times | 248 Scottish Conservative voters | Good Prime Minister/Bad Prime Minister | 29% | 24% | —N/a | 47% | +5% |
| 18–20 Jun 2019 | Panelbase/The Sunday Times | 1,024 Scottish adults | Good Prime Minister/Bad Prime Minister | 17% | 35% | —N/a | 48% | –18% |
| 11–14 Jun 2019 | YouGov | 892 Conservative members | Good Prime Minister/Bad Prime Minister | 61% | 30% | 2% | 8% | +31% |
| 9–10 Jun 2019 | YouGov | 552 2017 Conservative voters | Good Prime Minister/Bad Prime Minister | 31% | 33% | 20% | 17% | –2% |
| 9–10 Jun 2019 | YouGov | 252 Conservative voters | Good Prime Minister/Bad Prime Minister | 38% | 23% | 18% | 21% | +15% |
| 9–10 Jun 2019 | YouGov | 1,672 British voters | Good Prime Minister/Bad Prime Minister | 18% | 37% | 31% | 14% | –19% |
| 9 Jun 2019 | Opinium | 650 2017 Conservative voters | Good Prime Minister/Bad Prime Minister | 6% | 17% | —N/a | 77% | –11% |
| 9 Jun 2019 | Opinium | 255 Conservative voters | Good Prime Minister/Bad Prime Minister | 12% | 9% | —N/a | 79% | +3% |
| 9 Jun 2019 | Opinium | 1,629 British voters | Good Prime Minister/Bad Prime Minister | 5% | 23% | —N/a | 72% | –18% |
| 7–9 Jun 2019 | ComRes | 2,017 British voters | Good Prime Minister/Bad Prime Minister | 12% | 45% | —N/a | 43% | –33% |
| 3–4 Jun 2019 | YouGov | 579 2017 Conservative voters | Good Prime Minister/Bad Prime Minister | 28% | 34% | 22% | 16% | –6% |
| 3–4 Jun 2019 | YouGov | 1,755 British voters | Good Prime Minister/Bad Prime Minister | 18% | 37% | 31% | 14% | –19% |
| 23–24 May 2019 | YouGov | 523 2017 Conservative voters | Good Prime Minister/Bad Prime Minister | 25% | 36% | 21% | 18% | –11% |
| 23–24 May 2019 | YouGov | 1,586 British voters | Good Prime Minister/Bad Prime Minister | 20% | 32% | 33% | 16% | –12% |
| 10–16 May 2019 | YouGov | 858 Conservative members | Good leader/Bad leader | 46% | 38% | 11% | 5% | +8% |
| 10–14 May 2019 | Ipsos MORI | 222 Conservative voters | Good Prime Minister/Bad Prime Minister | 36% | 36% | —N/a | 28% | Tie |
| 10–14 May 2019 | Ipsos MORI | 1,072 British voters | Good Prime Minister/Bad Prime Minister | 20% | 47% | —N/a | 33% | –27% |
| 25–26 Mar 2019 | YouGov/Times RedBox | 2,143 British voters | Good Prime Minister/Bad Prime Minister | 19% | 30% | 34% | 17% | –11% |
| 15–19 Mar 2019 | Ipsos MORI | 124 Conservative Party voters | Satisfied/Dissatisfied | 32% | 40% | —N/a | 28% | –8% |
| 14–15 Mar 2019 | YouGov/The Times | 402 Conservative voters | Good leader/Bad leader | 25% | 35% | 22% | 18% | –10% |
| 14–15 Mar 2019 | YouGov/The Times | 579 2017 Conservative voters | Good leader/Bad leader | 25% | 36% | 23% | 16% | –11% |
| 14–15 Mar 2019 | YouGov/The Times | 1,756 British voters | Good leader/Bad leader | 20% | 37% | 29% | 14% | –17% |
| 14–15 Nov 2018 | YouGov/The Times | 1,671 British voters | Good leader/Bad leader | 16% | 32% | 35% | 17% | –16% |
| 5–8 Jul 2018 | YouGov | Conservative members | Good leader/Bad leader | 62% | 26% | 7% | 4% | +36% |
| 20–27 Sep 2017 | YouGov | 966 Conservative Members | Good leader/Bad leader | 29% | 35% | 13% | 23% | –6% |

Boris Johnson

| Date(s) conducted | Polling organisation/client | Sample size | Question wording | Approve | Disapprove | Neither | Don't know | Net approval |
|---|---|---|---|---|---|---|---|---|
| 21–22 Jul 2019 | YouGov | 1,655 2017 Conservative voters | Good Prime Minister/Bad Prime Minister | 39% | 25% | 0% | 36% | +14% |
| 21–22 Jul 2019 | YouGov | 1,655 British voters | Good Prime Minister/Bad Prime Minister | 20% | 50% | —N/a | 30% | –30% |
| 21–22 Jul 2019 | YouGov | 546 2017 Conservative voters | Favourable/Unfavourable | 61% | 35% | —N/a | 5% | +26% |
| 21–22 Jul 2019 | YouGov | 546 2017 Conservative voters | Favourable/Unfavourable | 31% | 58% | —N/a | 11% | –27% |
| 18–20 Jun 2019 | Panelbase/The Sunday Times | 248 Scottish Conservative voters | Good Prime Minister/Bad Prime Minister | 34% | 29% | —N/a | 37% | +5% |
| 18–20 Jun 2019 | Panelbase/The Sunday Times | 1,024 Scottish adults | Good Prime Minister/Bad Prime Minister | 16% | 53% | —N/a | 31% | –37% |
| 18–20 Jun 2019 | Opinium | 324 Conservative members | Good Prime Minister/Bad Prime Minister | 75% | 17% | —N/a | 8% | +58% |
| 18–20 Jun 2019 | Opinium | 1,919 British adults | Good Prime Minister/Bad Prime Minister | 43% | 46% | —N/a | 11% | –3% |
| 11–14 Jun 2019 | YouGov | 892 Conservative members | Good Prime Minister/Bad Prime Minister | 77% | 19% | 0% | 4% | +58% |
| 9–10 Jun 2019 | YouGov | 552 2017 Conservative voters | Good Prime Minister/Bad Prime Minister | 57% | 27% | 6% | 11% | +30% |
| 9–10 Jun 2019 | YouGov | 252 Conservative voters | Good Prime Minister/Bad Prime Minister | 61% | 22% | 2% | 13% | +39% |
| 9–10 Jun 2019 | YouGov | 1,672 British voters | Good Prime Minister/Bad Prime Minister | 31% | 49% | 11% | 10% | –18% |
| 9 Jun 2019 | Opinium | 736 2017 Conservative voters | Good Prime Minister/Bad Prime Minister | 14% | 26% | —N/a | 60% | –12% |
| 9 Jun 2019 | Opinium | 284 Conservative voters | Good Prime Minister/Bad Prime Minister | 15% | 26% | —N/a | 59% | –11% |
| 9 Jun 2019 | Opinium | 1,865 British voters | Good Prime Minister/Bad Prime Minister | 17% | 32% | —N/a | 51% | –15% |
| 7–9 Jun 2019 | ComRes | 2,017 British voters | Good Prime Minister/Bad Prime Minister | 27% | 49% | —N/a | 24% | –22% |
| 3–4 Jun 2019 | YouGov | 579 2017 Conservative voters | Good Prime Minister/Bad Prime Minister | 48% | 34% | 5% | 13% | +14% |
| 3–4 Jun 2019 | YouGov | 1,755 British voters | Good Prime Minister/Bad Prime Minister | 26% | 53% | 11% | 10% | –27% |
| 23–24 May 2019 | YouGov | 523 2017 Conservative voters | Good Prime Minister/Bad Prime Minister | 49% | 38% | 9% | 10% | +11% |
| 23–24 May 2019 | YouGov | 1,586 British voters | Good Prime Minister/Bad Prime Minister | 26% | 55% | 9% | 10% | –29% |
| 10–16 May 2019 | YouGov | 858 Conservative members | Good leader/Bad leader | 64% | 31% | 4% | 1% | +33% |
| 10–14 May 2019 | Ipsos MORI | 222 Conservative voters | Good Prime Minister/Bad Prime Minister | 36% | 53% | —N/a | 11% | –17% |
| 10–14 May 2019 | Ipsos MORI | 1,072 British voters | Good Prime Minister/Bad Prime Minister | 25% | 64% | —N/a | 11% | –39% |
| 25–26 Mar 2019 | YouGov/Times RedBox | 2,143 British voters | Good Prime Minister/Bad Prime Minister | 28% | 54% | 10% | 8% | –26% |
| 15–19 Mar 2019 | Ipsos MORI | 124 Conservative Party voters | Satisfied/Dissatisfied | 32% | 58% | —N/a | 10% | –26% |
| 14–15 Mar 2019 | YouGov/The Times | 402 Conservative voters | Good leader/Bad leader | 41% | 48% | 5% | 6% | –7% |
| 14–15 Mar 2019 | YouGov/The Times | 579 2017 Conservative voters | Good leader/Bad leader | 43% | 45% | 4% | 7% | –2% |
| 14–15 Mar 2019 | YouGov/The Times | 1,756 British voters | Good leader/Bad leader | 25% | 58% | 9% | 9% | –33% |
| 14–15 Nov 2018 | YouGov/The Times | 1,671 British voters | Good leader/Bad leader | 26% | 52% | 10% | 12% | –26% |
| 5–8 Jul 2018 | YouGov | Conservative members | Good leader/Bad leader | 47% | 48% | 4% | 1% | –1% |
| 20–27 Sep 2017 | YouGov | 966 Conservative Members | Good leader/Bad leader | 56% | 36% | 6% | 2% | +20% |

Amber Rudd

| Date(s) conducted | Polling organisation/client | Sample size | Question wording | Approve | Disapprove | Neither | Don't know | Net approval |
|---|---|---|---|---|---|---|---|---|
| 15–19 Mar 2019 | Ipsos MORI | 124 Conservative Party voters | Satisfied/Dissatisfied | 31% | 38% | —N/a | 31% | –7% |
| 14–15 Mar 2019 | YouGov/The Times | 402 Conservative voters | Good leader/Bad leader | 19% | 46% | 22% | 14% | –27% |
| 14–15 Mar 2019 | YouGov/The Times | 579 2017 Conservative voters | Good leader/Bad leader | 17% | 50% | 20% | 12% | –33% |
| 14–15 Mar 2019 | YouGov/The Times | 1,756 British voters | Good leader/Bad leader | 16% | 42% | 29% | 12% | –26% |
| 10–14 May 2019 | Ipsos MORI | 222 Conservative voters | Good Prime Minister/Bad Prime Minister | 30% | 38% | —N/a | 32% | –8% |
| 10–14 May 2019 | Ipsos MORI | 1,072 British voters | Good Prime Minister/Bad Prime Minister | 19% | 51% | —N/a | 30% | –32% |

Michael Gove

| Date(s) conducted | Polling organisation/client | Sample size | Question wording | Approve | Disapprove | Neither | Don't know | Net approval |
|---|---|---|---|---|---|---|---|---|
| 18–20 Jun 2019 | Panelbase/The Sunday Times | 248 Scottish Conservative voters | Good Prime Minister/Bad Prime Minister | 32% | 23% | —N/a | 45% | +9% |
| 18–20 Jun 2019 | Panelbase/The Sunday Times | 1,024 Scottish adults | Good Prime Minister/Bad Prime Minister | 16% | 41% | —N/a | 43% | –25% |
| 11–14 Jun 2019 | YouGov | 892 Conservative members | Good Prime Minister/Bad Prime Minister | 50% | 45% | 1% | 5% | +5% |
| 9–10 Jun 2019 | YouGov | 552 2017 Conservative voters | Good Prime Minister/Bad Prime Minister | 25% | 46% | 14% | 15% | –21% |
| 9–10 Jun 2019 | YouGov | 252 Conservative voters | Good Prime Minister/Bad Prime Minister | 37% | 38% | 21% | 12% | –1% |
| 9–10 Jun 2019 | YouGov | 1,672 British voters | Good Prime Minister/Bad Prime Minister | 14% | 53% | 21% | 12% | –39% |
| 9 Jun 2019 | Opinium | 692 2017 Conservative voters | Good Prime Minister/Bad Prime Minister | 9% | 21% | —N/a | 70% | –12% |
| 9 Jun 2019 | Opinium | 262 Conservative voters | Good Prime Minister/Bad Prime Minister | 11% | 14% | —N/a | 75% | –3% |
| 9 Jun 2019 | Opinium | 1,865 British voters | Good Prime Minister/Bad Prime Minister | 5% | 29% | —N/a | 76% | –24% |
| 7–9 Jun 2019 | ComRes | 2,017 British voters | Good Prime Minister/Bad Prime Minister | 12% | 50% | —N/a | 38% | –38% |
| 3–4 Jun 2019 | YouGov | 579 2017 Conservative voters | Good Prime Minister/Bad Prime Minister | 24% | 49% | 13% | 14% | –25% |
| 3–4 Jun 2019 | YouGov | 1,755 British voters | Good Prime Minister/Bad Prime Minister | 15% | 53% | 22% | 13% | –31% |
| 23–24 May 2019 | YouGov | 523 2017 Conservative voters | Good Prime Minister/Bad Prime Minister | 23% | 49% | 13% | 14% | –16% |
| 23–24 May 2019 | YouGov | 1,586 British voters | Good Prime Minister/Bad Prime Minister | 12% | 52% | 24% | 12% | –40% |
| 10–16 May 2019 | YouGov | 858 Conservative members | Good leader/Bad leader | 47% | 44% | 5% | 3% | +3% |
| 10–14 May 2019 | Ipsos MORI | 222 Conservative voters | Good Prime Minister/Bad Prime Minister | 26% | 48% | —N/a | 26% | –22% |
| 10–14 May 2019 | Ipsos MORI | 1,072 British voters | Good Prime Minister/Bad Prime Minister | 16% | 56% | —N/a | 28% | –40% |
| 25–26 Mar 2019 | YouGov/Times RedBox | 2,143 British voters | Good Prime Minister/Bad Prime Minister | 16% | 47% | 25% | 15% | –31% |
| 15–19 Mar 2019 | Ipsos MORI | 124 Conservative Party voters | Satisfied/Dissatisfied | 30% | 45% | —N/a | 25% | –15% |
| 14–15 Mar 2019 | YouGov/The Times | 402 Conservative voters | Good leader/Bad leader | 28% | 45% | 15% | 12% | –17% |
| 14–15 Mar 2019 | YouGov/The Times | 579 2017 Conservative voters | Good leader/Bad leader | 24% | 48% | 16% | 12% | –24% |
| 14–15 Mar 2019 | YouGov/The Times | 1,756 British voters | Good leader/Bad leader | 14% | 52% | 23% | 11% | –38% |
| 14–15 Nov 2018 | YouGov/The Times | 1,671 British voters | Good leader/Bad leader | 13% | 51% | 24% | 13% | –38% |
| 5–8 Jul 2018 | YouGov | Conservative members | Good leader/Bad leader | 52% | 40% | 6% | 2% | +12% |

Dominic Raab

| Date(s) conducted | Polling organisation/client | Sample size | Question wording | Approve | Disapprove | Neither | Don't know | Net approval |
|---|---|---|---|---|---|---|---|---|
| 18–20 Jun 2019 | Panelbase/The Sunday Times | 248 Scottish Conservative voters | Good Prime Minister/Bad Prime Minister | 18% | 22% | —N/a | 60% | –4% |
| 18–20 Jun 2019 | Panelbase/The Sunday Times | 1,024 Scottish adults | Good Prime Minister/Bad Prime Minister | 9% | 36% | —N/a | 55% | –27% |
| 11–14 Jun 2019 | YouGov | 892 Conservative members | Good Prime Minister/Bad Prime Minister | 68% | 21% | 4% | 7% | +47% |
| 9–10 Jun 2019 | YouGov | 552 2017 Conservative voters | Good Prime Minister/Bad Prime Minister | 23% | 23% | 32% | 21% | Tie |
| 9–10 Jun 2019 | YouGov | 252 Conservative voters | Good Prime Minister/Bad Prime Minister | 26% | 21% | 27% | 25% | +5% |
| 9–10 Jun 2019 | YouGov | 1,672 British voters | Good Prime Minister/Bad Prime Minister | 13% | 32% | 39% | 16% | –19% |
| 9 Jun 2019 | Opinium | 589 2017 Conservative voters | Good Prime Minister/Bad Prime Minister | 8% | 9% | —N/a | 83% | –1% |
| 9 Jun 2019 | Opinium | 227 Conservative voters | Good Prime Minister/Bad Prime Minister | 9% | 7% | —N/a | 59% | +2% |
| 9 Jun 2019 | Opinium | 1,434 British voters | Good Prime Minister/Bad Prime Minister | 7% | 23% | —N/a | 70% | –16% |
| 7–9 Jun 2019 | ComRes | 2,017 British voters | Good Prime Minister/Bad Prime Minister | 11% | 39% | —N/a | 50% | –28% |
| 3–4 Jun 2019 | YouGov | 579 2017 Conservative voters | Good Prime Minister/Bad Prime Minister | 26% | 20% | 35% | 17% | +6% |
| 3–4 Jun 2019 | YouGov | 1,755 British voters | Good Prime Minister/Bad Prime Minister | 14% | 28% | 44% | 14% | –14% |
| 23–24 May 2019 | YouGov | 523 2017 Conservative voters | Good Prime Minister/Bad Prime Minister | 23% | 19% | 50% | 14% | +4% |
| 23–24 May 2019 | YouGov | 1,586 British voters | Good Prime Minister/Bad Prime Minister | 12% | 26% | 50% | 14% | –14% |
| 10–16 May 2019 | YouGov | 858 Conservative members | Good leader/Bad leader | 53% | 27% | 10% | 10% | +26% |
| 10–14 May 2019 | Ipsos MORI | 222 Conservative voters | Good Prime Minister/Bad Prime Minister | 22% | 29% | —N/a | 47% | –7% |
| 10–14 May 2019 | Ipsos MORI | 1,072 British voters | Good Prime Minister/Bad Prime Minister | 13% | 45% | —N/a | 42% | –32% |
| 25–26 Mar 2019 | YouGov/Times RedBox | 2,143 British voters | Good Prime Minister/Bad Prime Minister | 10% | 24% | 50% | 16% | –14% |
| 15–19 Mar 2019 | Ipsos MORI | 124 Conservative Party voters | Satisfied/Dissatisfied | 20% | 44% | —N/a | 36% | –24% |
| 14–15 Mar 2019 | YouGov/The Times | 402 Conservative voters | Good leader/Bad leader | 20% | 27% | 38% | 16% | –7% |
| 14–15 Mar 2019 | YouGov/The Times | 579 2017 Conservative voters | Good leader/Bad leader | 19% | 27% | 38% | 17% | –8% |
| 14–15 Mar 2019 | YouGov/The Times | 1,756 British voters | Good leader/Bad leader | 11% | 30% | 46% | 14% | –19% |
| 14–15 Nov 2018 | YouGov/The Times | 1,671 British voters | Good leader/Bad leader | 12% | 28% | 43% | 17% | –16% |

David Davis

| Date(s) conducted | Polling organisation/client | Sample size | Question wording | Approve | Disapprove | Neither | Don't know | Net approval |
|---|---|---|---|---|---|---|---|---|
| 15–19 Mar 2019 | YouGov/The Times | 1,756 British voters | Good leader/Bad leader | 16% | 35% | 35% | 14% | –19% |
| 14–15 Mar 2019 | YouGov/The Times | 402 Conservative voters | Good leader/Bad leader | 26% | 34% | 24% | 16% | –8% |
| 14–15 Mar 2019 | YouGov/The Times | 579 2017 Conservative voters | Good leader/Bad leader | 26% | 32% | 26% | 16% | –6% |
| 14–15 Mar 2019 | YouGov/The Times | 1,756 British voters | Good leader/Bad leader | 16% | 35% | 46% | 14% | –19% |
| 14–15 Nov 2018 | YouGov/The Times | 1,671 British voters | Good leader/Bad leader | 19% | 32% | 35% | 15% | –13% |

Jacob Rees-Mogg

| Date(s) conducted | Polling organisation/client | Sample size | Question wording | Approve | Disapprove | Neither | Don't know | Net approval |
|---|---|---|---|---|---|---|---|---|
| 15–19 Mar 2019 | YouGov/The Times | 1,756 British voters | Good leader/Bad leader | 19% | 47% | 25% | 10% | –28% |
| 14–15 Mar 2019 | YouGov/The Times | 402 Conservative voters | Good leader/Bad leader | 27% | 44% | 19% | 10% | –14% |
| 14–15 Mar 2019 | YouGov/The Times | 579 2017 Conservative voters | Good leader/Bad leader | 32% | 40% | 18% | 10% | –8% |
| 14–15 Mar 2019 | YouGov/The Times | 1,756 British voters | Good leader/Bad leader | 19% | 47% | 25% | 10% | –28% |
| 14–15 Nov 2018 | YouGov/The Times | 1,671 British voters | Good leader/Bad leader | 25% | 38% | 26% | 11% | –13% |

Andrea Leadsom

| Date(s) conducted | Polling organisation/client | Sample size | Question wording | Approve | Disapprove | Neither | Don't know | Net approval |
|---|---|---|---|---|---|---|---|---|
| 11–14 Jun 2019 | YouGov | 892 Conservative members | Good Prime Minister/Bad Prime Minister | 55% | 34% | 3% | 8% | +21% |
| 9 Jun 2019 | Opinium | 605 2017 Conservative voters | Good Prime Minister/Bad Prime Minister | 8% | 13% | —N/a | 79% | –5% |
| 9 Jun 2019 | Opinium | 221 Conservative voters | Good Prime Minister/Bad Prime Minister | 10% | 8% | —N/a | 72% | +2% |
| 9 Jun 2019 | Opinium | 1,467 British voters | Good Prime Minister/Bad Prime Minister | 6% | 25% | —N/a | 69% | –19% |
| 3–4 Jun 2019 | YouGov | 579 2017 Conservative voters | Good Prime Minister/Bad Prime Minister | 30% | 26% | 40% | 13% | +4% |
| 3–4 Jun 2019 | YouGov | 1,755 British voters | Good Prime Minister/Bad Prime Minister | 15% | 31% | 40% | 13% | –16% |
| 23–24 May 2019 | YouGov | 523 2017 Conservative voters | Good Prime Minister/Bad Prime Minister | 31% | 25% | 40% | 14% | +6% |
| 23–24 May 2019 | YouGov | 1,586 British voters | Good Prime Minister/Bad Prime Minister | 16% | 30% | 40% | 14% | –14% |
| 25–26 Mar 2019 | YouGov/Times RedBox | 2,143 British voters | Good Prime Minister/Bad Prime Minister | 13% | 29% | 42% | 16% | –16% |

Matt Hancock

| Date(s) conducted | Polling organisation/client | Sample size | Question wording | Approve | Disapprove | Neither | Don't know | Net approval |
|---|---|---|---|---|---|---|---|---|
| 11–14 Jun 2019 | YouGov | 892 Conservative members | Good Prime Minister/Bad Prime Minister | 25% | 44% | 17% | 15% | –19% |
| 9–10 Jun 2019 | YouGov | 552 2017 Conservative voters | Good Prime Minister/Bad Prime Minister | 10% | 25% | 43% | 23% | +15% |
| 9–10 Jun 2019 | YouGov | 252 Conservative voters | Good Prime Minister/Bad Prime Minister | 15% | 29% | 48% | 18% | –14% |
| 9–10 Jun 2019 | YouGov | 1,672 British voters | Good Prime Minister/Bad Prime Minister | 6% | 29% | 48% | 18% | –16% |
| 9 Jun 2019 | Opinium | 589 2017 Conservative voters | Good Prime Minister/Bad Prime Minister | 3% | 16% | —N/a | 81% | –13% |
| 9 Jun 2019 | Opinium | 172 Conservative voters | Good Prime Minister/Bad Prime Minister | 7% | 8% | —N/a | 85% | –1% |
| 9 Jun 2019 | Opinium | 1,133 British voters | Good Prime Minister/Bad Prime Minister | 3% | 21% | —N/a | 76% | –18% |
| 3–4 Jun 2019 | YouGov | 579 2017 Conservative voters | Good Prime Minister/Bad Prime Minister | 8% | 17% | 62% | 13% | –9% |
| 3–4 Jun 2019 | YouGov | 1,755 British voters | Good Prime Minister/Bad Prime Minister | 6% | 20% | 64% | 11% | –14% |
| 23–24 May 2019 | YouGov | 523 2017 Conservative voters | Good Prime Minister/Bad Prime Minister | 7% | 14% | 63% | 16% | –7% |
| 23–24 May 2019 | YouGov | 1,586 British voters | Good Prime Minister/Bad Prime Minister | 5% | 16% | 66% | 14% | –11% |
| 10–16 May 2019 | YouGov | 858 Conservative members | Good leader/Bad leader | 18% | 35% | 17% | 30% | –17% |

Penny Mordaunt

| Date(s) conducted | Polling organisation/client | Sample size | Question wording | Approve | Disapprove | Neither | Don't know | Net approval |
|---|---|---|---|---|---|---|---|---|
| 23–24 May 2019 | YouGov | 523 2017 Conservative voters | Good Prime Minister/Bad Prime Minister | 9% | 17% | 56% | 17% | –8% |
| 23–24 May 2019 | YouGov | 1,586 British voters | Good Prime Minister/Bad Prime Minister | 6% | 19% | 61% | 14% | –13% |
| 10–16 May 2019 | YouGov | 858 Conservative members | Good leader/Bad leader | 37% | 28% | 13% | 21% | +9% |
| 10–14 May 2019 | Ipsos MORI | 222 Conservative voters | Good Prime Minister/Bad Prime Minister | 21% | 28% | —N/a | 51% | –7% |
| 10–14 May 2019 | Ipsos MORI | 1,072 British voters | Good Prime Minister/Bad Prime Minister | 11% | 36% | —N/a | 53% | –25% |
| 5–8 Jul 2018 | YouGov | Conservative members | Good leader/Bad leader | 30% | 23% | 17% | 30% | +7% |

Rory Stewart

| Date(s) conducted | Polling organisation/client | Sample size | Question wording | Approve | Disapprove | Neither | Don't know | Net approval |
|---|---|---|---|---|---|---|---|---|
| 18–20 Jun 2019 | Panelbase/The Sunday Times | 248 Scottish Conservative voters | Good Prime Minister/Bad Prime Minister | 33% | 20% | —N/a | 47% | +13% |
| 18–20 Jun 2019 | Panelbase/The Sunday Times | 1,024 Scottish adults | Good Prime Minister/Bad Prime Minister | 21% | 25% | —N/a | 54% | –4% |
| 11–14 Jun 2019 | YouGov | 892 Conservative members | Good Prime Minister/Bad Prime Minister | 31% | 50% | 9% | 10% | –19% |
| 9–10 Jun 2019 | YouGov | 552 2017 Conservative voters | Good Prime Minister/Bad Prime Minister | 16% | 26% | 38% | 20% | –10% |
| 9–10 Jun 2019 | YouGov | 252 Conservative voters | Good Prime Minister/Bad Prime Minister | 21% | 21% | 43% | 16% | Tie |
| 9–10 Jun 2019 | YouGov | 1,672 British voters | Good Prime Minister/Bad Prime Minister | 15% | 25% | 43% | 16% | –10% |
| 9 Jun 2019 | Opinium | 429 2017 Conservative voters | Good Prime Minister/Bad Prime Minister | 7% | 21% | —N/a | 72% | –14% |
| 9 Jun 2019 | Opinium | 163 Conservative voters | Good Prime Minister/Bad Prime Minister | 7% | 12% | —N/a | 81% | –6% |
| 9 Jun 2019 | Opinium | 1,132 British voters | Good Prime Minister/Bad Prime Minister | 7% | 20% | —N/a | 73% | –13% |
| 7–9 Jun 2019 | ComRes | 2,017 British voters | Good Prime Minister/Bad Prime Minister | 9% | 35% | —N/a | 55% | –26% |
| 3–4 Jun 2019 | YouGov | 579 2017 Conservative voters | Good Prime Minister/Bad Prime Minister | 12% | 19% | 57% | 13% | –7% |
| 3–4 Jun 2019 | YouGov | 1,755 British voters | Good Prime Minister/Bad Prime Minister | 12% | 17% | 60% | 12% | –5% |
| 23–24 May 2019 | YouGov | 523 2017 Conservative voters | Good Prime Minister/Bad Prime Minister | 6% | 13% | 69% | 12% | –7% |
| 23–24 May 2019 | YouGov | 1,586 British voters | Good Prime Minister/Bad Prime Minister | 5% | 14% | 70% | 12% | –9% |
| 10–16 May 2019 | YouGov | 858 Conservative members | Good leader/Bad leader | 19% | 38% | 12% | 30% | –19% |
| 10–14 May 2019 | Ipsos MORI | 222 Conservative voters | Good Prime Minister/Bad Prime Minister | 17% | 24% | —N/a | 63% | –7% |
| 10–14 May 2019 | Ipsos MORI | 1,072 British voters | Good Prime Minister/Bad Prime Minister | 11% | 30% | —N/a | 59% | –19% |

Kit Malthouse

| Date(s) conducted | Polling organisation/client | Sample size | Question wording | Approve | Disapprove | Neither | Don't know | Net approval |
|---|---|---|---|---|---|---|---|---|
| 3–4 Jun 2019 | YouGov | 579 2017 Conservative voters | Good Prime Minister/Bad Prime Minister | 3% | 9% | 75% | 15% | –6% |
| 3–4 Jun 2019 | YouGov | 1,755 British voters | Good Prime Minister/Bad Prime Minister | 2% | 13% | 74% | 11% | –11% |

Sam Gyimah

| Date(s) conducted | Polling organisation/client | Sample size | Question wording | Approve | Disapprove | Neither | Don't know | Net approval |
|---|---|---|---|---|---|---|---|---|
| 3–4 Jun 2019 | YouGov | 579 2017 Conservative voters | Good Prime Minister/Bad Prime Minister | 1% | 17% | 70% | 12% | –16% |
| 3–4 Jun 2019 | YouGov | 1,755 British voters | Good Prime Minister/Bad Prime Minister | 3% | 15% | 71% | 10% | –12% |

Esther McVey

| Date(s) conducted | Polling organisation/client | Sample size | Question wording | Approve | Disapprove | Neither | Don't know | Net approval |
|---|---|---|---|---|---|---|---|---|
| 11–14 Jun 2019 | YouGov | 892 Conservative members | Good Prime Minister/Bad Prime Minister | 45% | 38% | 7% | 10% | +7% |
| 9 Jun 2019 | Opinium | 546 2017 Conservative voters | Good Prime Minister/Bad Prime Minister | 8% | 15% | —N/a | 77% | –8% |
| 9 Jun 2019 | Opinium | 214 Conservative voters | Good Prime Minister/Bad Prime Minister | 10% | 11% | —N/a | 79% | –1% |
| 9 Jun 2019 | Opinium | 1,342 British voters | Good Prime Minister/Bad Prime Minister | 6% | 27% | —N/a | 77% | –21% |
| 3–4 Jun 2019 | YouGov | 579 2017 Conservative voters | Good Prime Minister/Bad Prime Minister | 20% | 26% | 40% | 14% | –6% |
| 3–4 Jun 2019 | YouGov | 1,755 British voters | Good Prime Minister/Bad Prime Minister | 10% | 30% | 46% | 13% | –20% |

Mark Harper

| Date(s) conducted | Polling organisation/client | Sample size | Question wording | Approve | Disapprove | Neither | Don't know | Net approval |
|---|---|---|---|---|---|---|---|---|
| 11–14 Jun 2019 | YouGov | 892 Conservative members | Good Prime Minister/Bad Prime Minister | 14% | 35% | 33% | 17% | –21% |
| 9 Jun 2019 | Opinium | 295 2017 Conservative voters | Good Prime Minister/Bad Prime Minister | 5% | 13% | —N/a | 72% | –8% |
| 9 Jun 2019 | Opinium | 118 Conservative voters | Good Prime Minister/Bad Prime Minister | 9% | 10% | —N/a | 81% | –1% |
| 9 Jun 2019 | Opinium | 793 British voters | Good Prime Minister/Bad Prime Minister | 5% | 19% | —N/a | 76% | –14% |
| 3–4 Jun 2019 | YouGov | 579 2017 Conservative voters | Good Prime Minister/Bad Prime Minister | 3% | 10% | 76% | 12% | –7% |
| 3–4 Jun 2019 | YouGov | 1,755 British voters | Good Prime Minister/Bad Prime Minister | 1% | 12% | 75% | 11% | –11% |

James Cleverly

| Date(s) conducted | Polling organisation/client | Sample size | Question wording | Approve | Disapprove | Neither | Don't know | Net approval |
|---|---|---|---|---|---|---|---|---|
| 3–4 Jun 2019 | YouGov | 579 2017 Conservative voters | Good Prime Minister/Bad Prime Minister | 6% | 13% | 67% | 14% | –7% |
| 3–4 Jun 2019 | YouGov | 1,755 British voters | Good Prime Minister/Bad Prime Minister | 4% | 16% | 69% | 11% | –12% |

== Candidate comparison with Theresa May ==
Boris Johnson

| Date(s) conducted | Polling organisation/client | Sample size | Better Prime Minister | Worse Prime Minister | Don't know | Net approval |
|---|---|---|---|---|---|---|
| 3–5 July 2019 | Opinium | 760 2017 Conservative voters | 52% | 25% | 24% | +27% |
| 3–5 July 2019 | Opinium | 372 Conservative voters | 52% | 24% | 26% | +28% |
| 3–5 July 2019 | Opinium | 2,002 British voters | 31% | 43% | 26% | –12% |

Jeremy Hunt

| Date(s) conducted | Polling organisation/client | Sample size | Better Prime Minister | Worse Prime Minister | Don't know | Net approval |
|---|---|---|---|---|---|---|
| 3–5 July 2019 | Opinium | 760 2017 Conservative voters | 34% | 16% | 50% | +18% |
| 3–5 July 2019 | Opinium | 372 Conservative voters | 39% | 14% | 47% | +25% |
| 3–5 July 2019 | Opinium | 2,002 British voters | 25% | 24% | 51% | +1% |

=== Leadership capabilities in a general election ===
Boris Johnson

| Date(s) conducted | Polling organisation/client | Sample size | Win | Lose | Don't know | Net approval |
|---|---|---|---|---|---|---|
| 13–14 Jun 2019 | YouGov | 522 2017 Conservative voters | 67% | 13% | 20% | +54% |
| 13–14 Jun 2019 | YouGov | 252 Conservative voters | 75% | 10% | 15% | +65% |
| 13–14 Jun 2019 | YouGov | 1,672 British voters | 47% | 22% | 32% | +25% |
| 3–4 Jun 2019 | YouGov | 579 2017 Conservative voters | 54% | 22% | 22% | +32% |
| 3–4 Jun 2019 | YouGov | 1,755 British voters | 39% | 31% | 30% | +8% |
| 23–24 May 2019 | YouGov | 523 2017 Conservative voters | 56% | 22% | 22% | +34% |
| 23–24 May 2019 | YouGov | 1,586 British voters | 37% | 33% | 30% | +4% |
| 10–16 May 2019 | YouGov | 858 Conservative members | 70% | 19% | 11% | +51% |
| 25–26 Mar 2019 | YouGov/Times RedBox | 2,143 British voters | 32% | 37% | 31% | –5% |
| 5–8 Jul 2018 | YouGov | Conservative members | 57% | 29% | 13% | +28% |
| 20–27 Jul 2017 | YouGov | 966 Conservative members | 57% | 29% | 13% | +28% |

Michael Gove

| Date(s) conducted | Polling organisation/client | Sample size | Win | Lose | Don't know | Net approval |
|---|---|---|---|---|---|---|
| 13–14 Jun 2019 | YouGov | 522 2017 Conservative voters | 18% | 50% | 32% | –32% |
| 13–14 Jun 2019 | YouGov | 252 Conservative voters | 30% | 42% | 28% | –12% |
| 13–14 Jun 2019 | YouGov | 1,672 British voters | 12% | 48% | 40% | –36% |
| 3–4 Jun 2019 | YouGov | 579 2017 Conservative voters | 19% | 51% | 30% | –32% |
| 3–4 Jun 2019 | YouGov | 1,755 British voters | 16% | 48% | 36% | –32% |
| 23–24 May 2019 | YouGov | 523 2017 Conservative voters | 22% | 45% | 33% | –23% |
| 23–24 May 2019 | YouGov | 1,586 British voters | 13% | 47% | 41% | –34% |
| 10–16 May 2019 | YouGov | 858 Conservative members | 32% | 46% | 22% | –14% |
| 25–26 Mar 2019 | YouGov/Times RedBox | 2,143 British voters | 16% | 44% | 40% | –28% |
| 5–8 Jul 2018 | YouGov | Conservative members | 42% | 40% | 17% | +2% |
| 20–27 Jul 2017 | YouGov | 966 Conservative members | 42% | 40% | 18% | +2% |

Sajid Javid

| Date(s) conducted | Polling organisation/client | Sample size | Win | Lose | Don't know | Net approval |
|---|---|---|---|---|---|---|
| 13–14 Jun 2019 | YouGov | 522 2017 Conservative voters | 20% | 43% | 37% | –23% |
| 13–14 Jun 2019 | YouGov | 252 Conservative voters | 25% | 37% | 38% | –12% |
| 13–14 Jun 2019 | YouGov | 1,672 British voters | 14% | 41% | 46% | –27% |
| 3–4 Jun 2019 | YouGov | 579 2017 Conservative voters | 18% | 46% | 36% | –28% |
| 3–4 Jun 2019 | YouGov | 1,755 British voters | 15% | 42% | 43% | –27% |
| 23–24 May 2019 | YouGov | 523 2017 Conservative voters | 19% | 43% | 38% | –24% |
| 23–24 May 2019 | YouGov | 1,586 British voters | 17% | 36% | 46% | –19% |
| 10–16 May 2019 | YouGov | 858 Conservative members | 39% | 35% | 26% | +4% |
| 25–26 Mar 2019 | YouGov/Times RedBox | 2,143 British voters | 19% | 32% | 49% | –13% |
| 5–8 Jul 2018 | YouGov | Conservative members | 61% | 22% | 17% | +39% |
| 20–27 Jul 2017 | YouGov | 966 Conservative members | 61% | 22% | 17% | +39% |

Jeremy Hunt

| Date(s) conducted | Polling organisation/client | Sample size | Win | Lose | Don't know | Net approval |
|---|---|---|---|---|---|---|
| 13–14 Jun 2019 | YouGov | 522 2017 Conservative voters | 24% | 41% | 36% | –17% |
| 13–14 Jun 2019 | YouGov | 252 Conservative voters | 32% | 29% | 39% | +3% |
| 13–14 Jun 2019 | YouGov | 1,672 British voters | 15% | 40% | 44% | –25% |
| 3–4 Jun 2019 | YouGov | 579 2017 Conservative voters | 19% | 44% | 36% | –25% |
| 3–4 Jun 2019 | YouGov | 1,755 British voters | 13% | 47% | 41% | –34% |
| 23–24 May 2019 | YouGov | 523 2017 Conservative voters | 16% | 43% | 41% | –27% |
| 23–24 May 2019 | YouGov | 1,586 British voters | 10% | 44% | 45% | –34% |
| 10–16 May 2019 | YouGov | 858 Conservative members | 29% | 45% | 26% | –16% |
| 25–26 Mar 2019 | YouGov/Times RedBox | 2,143 British voters | 13% | 42% | 46% | –29% |
| 5–8 Jul 2018 | YouGov | Conservative members | 28% | 51% | 21% | –23% |
| 20–27 Jul 2017 | YouGov | 966 Conservative members | 28% | 51% | 21% | –23% |

Dominic Raab

| Date(s) conducted | Polling organisation/client | Sample size | Win | Lose | Don't know | Net approval |
|---|---|---|---|---|---|---|
| 13–14 Jun 2019 | YouGov | 522 2017 Conservative voters | 13% | 43% | 45% | –30% |
| 13–14 Jun 2019 | YouGov | 252 Conservative voters | 19% | 38% | 43% | –19% |
| 13–14 Jun 2019 | YouGov | 1,672 British voters | 8% | 41% | 51% | –33% |
| 3–4 Jun 2019 | YouGov | 579 2017 Conservative voters | 16% | 38% | 46% | –22% |
| 3–4 Jun 2019 | YouGov | 1,755 British voters | 12% | 40% | 49% | –28% |
| 23–24 May 2019 | YouGov | 523 2017 Conservative voters | 15% | 33% | 52% | –18% |
| 23–24 May 2019 | YouGov | 1,586 British voters | 10% | 33% | 57% | –23% |
| 10–16 May 2019 | YouGov | 858 Conservative members | 42% | 30% | 29% | +12% |
| 25–26 Mar 2019 | YouGov/Times RedBox | 2,143 British voters | 10% | 33% | 58% | –23% |

Andrea Leadsom

| Date(s) conducted | Polling organisation/client | Sample size | Win | Lose | Don't know | Net approval |
|---|---|---|---|---|---|---|
| 23–24 May 2019 | YouGov | 523 2017 Conservative voters | 21% | 36% | 43% | –15% |
| 23–24 May 2019 | YouGov | 1,586 British voters | 14% | 35% | 51% | –21% |
| 10–16 May 2019 | YouGov | 858 Conservative members | 28% | 46% | 27% | –18% |
| 25–26 Mar 2019 | YouGov/Times RedBox | 2,143 British voters | 11% | 36% | 53% | –25% |

Rory Stewart

| Date(s) conducted | Polling organisation/client | Sample size | Win | Lose | Don't know | Net approval |
|---|---|---|---|---|---|---|
| 13–14 Jun 2019 | YouGov | 522 2017 Conservative voters | 8% | 50% | 42% | –42% |
| 13–14 Jun 2019 | YouGov | 252 Conservative voters | 10% | 43% | 47% | –33% |
| 13–14 Jun 2019 | YouGov | 1,672 British voters | 8% | 40% | 52% | –32% |
| 23–24 May 2019 | YouGov | 523 2017 Conservative voters | 3% | 37% | 60% | –34% |
| 23–24 May 2019 | YouGov | 1,586 British voters | 3% | 33% | 64% | –30% |
| 10–16 May 2019 | YouGov | 858 Conservative members | 14% | 51% | 34% | –37% |

Matt Hancock

| Date(s) conducted | Polling organisation/client | Sample size | Win | Lose | Don't know | Net approval |
|---|---|---|---|---|---|---|
| 13–14 Jun 2019 | YouGov | 522 2017 Conservative voters | 4% | 51% | 45% | –47% |
| 13–14 Jun 2019 | YouGov | 252 Conservative voters | 7% | 45% | 48% | –38% |
| 13–14 Jun 2019 | YouGov | 1,672 British voters | 4% | 44% | 52% | –40% |
| 23–24 May 2019 | YouGov | 523 2017 Conservative voters | 4% | 36% | 60% | –32% |
| 23–24 May 2019 | YouGov | 1,586 British voters | 3% | 34% | 63% | –31% |
| 10–16 May 2019 | YouGov | 858 Conservative members | 11% | 46% | 43% | –35% |

Penny Mordaunt

| Date(s) conducted | Polling organisation/client | Sample size | Win | Lose | Don't know | Net approval |
|---|---|---|---|---|---|---|
| 23–24 May 2019 | YouGov | 523 2017 Conservative voters | 8% | 38% | 54% | –30% |
| 23–24 May 2019 | YouGov | 1,586 British voters | 6% | 34% | 60% | –18% |
| 10–16 May 2019 | YouGov | 858 Conservative members | 26% | 36% | 38% | –12% |
| 5–8 Jul 2018 | YouGov | Conservative members | 26% | 32% | 43% | –6% |
| 20–27 Jul 2017 | YouGov | 966 Conservative members | 26% | 32% | 43% | –6% |

=== Leadership capabilities in handling Brexit ===
Boris Johnson

| Date(s) conducted | Polling organisation/client | Sample size | Good Job | Bad Job | Neither | Don't know | Net approval |
|---|---|---|---|---|---|---|---|
| 15-16 Jul 2019 | ComRes | 2,038 British voters | 17% | 53% | —N/a | 14% | –36% |
| 13–14 Jun 2019 | YouGov | 522 2017 Conservative voters | 51% | 21% | 20% | 8% | +31% |
| 13–14 Jun 2019 | YouGov | 252 Conservative voters | 52% | 19% | 21% | 8% | +31% |
| 13–14 Jun 2019 | YouGov | 1,672 British voters | 27% | 40% | 25% | 8% | –13% |
| 3–4 Jun 2019 | YouGov | 579 2017 Conservative voters | 47% | 26% | 18% | 8% | +21% |
| 3–4 Jun 2019 | YouGov | 1,755 British voters | 26% | 43% | 24% | 7% | –17% |
| 23–24 May 2019 | YouGov | 523 2017 Conservative voters | 44% | 29% | 18% | 8% | +15% |
| 23–24 May 2019 | YouGov | 1,586 British voters | 23% | 43% | 25% | 9% | –20% |
| 25–26 Mar 2019 | YouGov/Times RedBox | 2,143 British voters | 24% | 43% | 24% | 9% | –19% |

Michael Gove

| Date(s) conducted | Polling organisation/client | Sample size | Good Job | Bad Job | Neither | Don't know | Net approval |
|---|---|---|---|---|---|---|---|
| 13–14 Jun 2019 | YouGov | 522 2017 Conservative voters | 18% | 38% | 31% | 13% | –7% |
| 13–14 Jun 2019 | YouGov | 252 Conservative voters | 29% | 27% | 33% | 11 | +2% |
| 13–14 Jun 2019 | YouGov | 1,672 British voters | 9% | 44% | 34% | 12% | –35% |
| 3–4 Jun 2019 | YouGov | 579 2017 Conservative voters | 18% | 41% | 28% | 13% | –23% |
| 3–4 Jun 2019 | YouGov | 1,755 British voters | 11% | 44% | 33% | 12% | –33% |
| 23–24 May 2019 | YouGov | 523 2017 Conservative voters | 21% | 36% | 28% | 14% | –15% |
| 23–24 May 2019 | YouGov | 1,586 British voters | 10% | 42% | 34% | 13% | –32% |
| 25–26 Mar 2019 | YouGov/Times RedBox | 2,143 British voters | 13% | 39% | 35% | 13% | –26% |

Sajid Javid

| Date(s) conducted | Polling organisation/client | Sample size | Good Job | Bad Job | Neither | Don't know | Net approval |
|---|---|---|---|---|---|---|---|
| 13–14 Jun 2019 | YouGov | 522 2017 Conservative voters | 12% | 34% | 36% | 17% | –22% |
| 13–14 Jun 2019 | YouGov | 252 Conservative voters | 19% | 27% | 40% | 14% | –8% |
| 13–14 Jun 2019 | YouGov | 1,672 British voters | 9% | 35% | 41% | 15% | –26% |
| 3–4 Jun 2019 | YouGov | 579 2017 Conservative voters | 14% | 32% | 38% | 16% | –18% |
| 3–4 Jun 2019 | YouGov | 1,755 British voters | 10% | 35% | 41% | 14% | –25% |
| 23–24 May 2019 | YouGov | 523 2017 Conservative voters | 12% | 31% | 38% | 19% | –19% |
| 23–24 May 2019 | YouGov | 1,586 British voters | 8% | 31% | 41% | 14% | –23% |

Jeremy Hunt

| Date(s) conducted | Polling organisation/client | Sample size | Good Job | Bad Job | Neither | Don't know | Net approval |
|---|---|---|---|---|---|---|---|
| 15-16 Jul 2019 | ComRes | 2,038 British voters | 22% | 30% | —N/a | 48% | –8% |
| 13–14 Jun 2019 | YouGov | 522 2017 Conservative voters | 16% | 37% | 34% | 13% | –21% |
| 13–14 Jun 2019 | YouGov | 252 Conservative voters | 25% | 25% | 38% | 12% | Tie |
| 13–14 Jun 2019 | YouGov | 1,672 British voters | 10% | 40% | 37% | 13% | –30% |
| 3–4 Jun 2019 | YouGov | 579 2017 Conservative voters | 14% | 38% | 35% | 13% | –24% |
| 3–4 Jun 2019 | YouGov | 1,755 British voters | 8% | 43% | 37% | 13% | –25% |
| 23–24 May 2019 | YouGov | 523 2017 Conservative voters | 7% | 38% | 40% | 15% | –31% |
| 23–24 May 2019 | YouGov | 1,586 British voters | 7% | 38% | 40% | 15% | –31% |
| 25–26 Mar 2019 | YouGov/Times RedBox | 2,143 British voters | 7% | 36% | 41% | 15% | –29% |

Dominic Raab

| Date(s) conducted | Polling organisation/client | Sample size | Good Job | Bad Job | Neither | Don't know | Net approval |
|---|---|---|---|---|---|---|---|
| 13–14 Jun 2019 | YouGov | 522 2017 Conservative voters | 19% | 26% | 43% | 13% | –7% |
| 13–14 Jun 2019 | YouGov | 252 Conservative voters | 20% | 20% | 46% | 13% | Tie |
| 13–14 Jun 2019 | YouGov | 1,672 British voters | 10% | 35% | 44% | 11% | –25% |
| 3–4 Jun 2019 | YouGov | 579 2017 Conservative voters | 21% | 22% | 42% | 15% | –1% |
| 3–4 Jun 2019 | YouGov | 1,755 British voters | 11% | 33% | 44% | 13% | –22% |
| 23–24 May 2019 | YouGov | 523 2017 Conservative voters | 17% | 22% | 44% | 17% | –5% |
| 23–24 May 2019 | YouGov | 1,586 British voters | 8% | 30% | 48% | 14% | –22% |
| 25–26 Mar 2019 | YouGov/Times RedBox | 2,143 British voters | 9% | 28% | 50% | 13% | –19% |

Andrea Leadsom

| Date(s) conducted | Polling organisation/client | Sample size | Good Job | Bad Job | Neither | Don't know | Net approval |
|---|---|---|---|---|---|---|---|
| 23–24 May 2019 | YouGov | 523 2017 Conservative voters | 24% | 25% | 37% | 15% | –1% |
| 23–24 May 2019 | YouGov | 1,586 British voters | 13% | 31% | 43% | 14% | –18% |
| 25–26 Mar 2019 | YouGov/Times RedBox | 2,143 British voters | 9% | 29% | 48% | 14% | –20% |

Penny Mordaunt

| Date(s) conducted | Polling organisation/client | Sample size | Good Job | Bad Job | Neither | Don't know | Net approval |
|---|---|---|---|---|---|---|---|
| 23–24 May 2019 | YouGov | 523 2017 Conservative voters | 6% | 22% | 55% | 17% | –16% |
| 23–24 May 2019 | YouGov | 1,586 British voters | 4% | 26% | 56% | 14% | –22% |

Matt Hancock

| Date(s) conducted | Polling organisation/client | Sample size | Good Job | Bad Job | Neither | Don't know | Net approval |
|---|---|---|---|---|---|---|---|
| 13–14 Jun 2019 | YouGov | 522 2017 Conservative voters | 5% | 32% | 50% | 14% | –27% |
| 13–14 Jun 2019 | YouGov | 252 Conservative voters | 6% | 26% | 53% | 15% | –20% |
| 13–14 Jun 2019 | YouGov | 1,672 British voters | 3% | 34% | 51% | 13% | –31% |
| 23–24 May 2019 | YouGov | 523 2017 Conservative voters | 4% | 19% | 57% | 18% | –15% |
| 23–24 May 2019 | YouGov | 1,586 British voters | 2% | 26% | 57% | 15% | –24% |

Rory Stewart

| Date(s) conducted | Polling organisation/client | Sample size | Good Job | Bad Job | Neither | Don't know | Net approval |
|---|---|---|---|---|---|---|---|
| 13–14 Jun 2019 | YouGov | 522 2017 Conservative voters | 8% | 34% | 42% | 15% | –26% |
| 13–14 Jun 2019 | YouGov | 252 Conservative voters | 11% | 27% | 48% | 14% | –16% |
| 13–14 Jun 2019 | YouGov | 1,672 British voters | 9% | 30% | 48% | 14% | –21% |
| 23–24 May 2019 | YouGov | 523 2017 Conservative voters | 4% | 18% | 61% | 17% | –14% |
| 23–24 May 2019 | YouGov | 1,586 British voters | 3% | 24% | 59% | 14% | –21% |

=== Leadership strength or weakness ===
Boris Johnson

| Date(s) conducted | Polling organisation/client | Sample size | Strong | Weak | Neither | Don't know | Net approval |
|---|---|---|---|---|---|---|---|
| 21–22 July 2019 | YouGov | 546 2017 Conservative voters | 65% | 16% | —N/a | 17% | +49% |
| 21–22 July 2019 | YouGov | 1,655 British adults | 41% | 34% | —N/a | 21% | +7% |
| 10–16 May 2019 | YouGov | 858 Conservative members | 69% | 17% | 7% | 8% | +52% |
| 5–8 Jul 2018 | YouGov | Conservative members | 57% | 25% | 11% | 7% | +32% |

Michael Gove

| Date(s) conducted | Polling organisation/client | Sample size | Strong | Weak | Neither | Don't know | Net approval |
|---|---|---|---|---|---|---|---|
| 10–16 May 2019 | YouGov | 858 Conservative members | 46% | 31% | 13% | 10% | +15% |
| 5–8 Jul 2018 | YouGov | Conservative members | 55% | 28% | 11% | 7% | +27% |

Sajid Javid

| Date(s) conducted | Polling organisation/client | Sample size | Strong | Weak | Neither | Don't know | Net approval |
|---|---|---|---|---|---|---|---|
| 10–16 May 2019 | YouGov | 858 Conservative members | 43% | 23% | 17% | 16% | +20% |
| 5–8 Jul 2018 | YouGov | Conservative members | 56% | 17% | 13% | 14% | +39% |

Jeremy Hunt

| Date(s) conducted | Polling organisation/client | Sample size | Strong | Weak | Neither | Don't know | Net approval |
|---|---|---|---|---|---|---|---|
| 10–16 May 2019 | YouGov | 858 Conservative members | 31% | 33% | 20% | 16% | –2% |
| 5–8 Jul 2018 | YouGov | Conservative members | 29% | 39% | 18% | 14% | –10% |

Rory Stewart

| Date(s) conducted | Polling organisation/client | Sample size | Strong | Weak | Neither | Don't know | Net approval |
|---|---|---|---|---|---|---|---|
| 10–16 May 2019 | YouGov | 858 Conservative members | 16% | 33% | 16% | 35% | –17% |

Dominic Raab

| Date(s) conducted | Polling organisation/client | Sample size | Strong | Weak | Neither | Don't know | Net approval |
|---|---|---|---|---|---|---|---|
| 10–16 May 2019 | YouGov | 858 Conservative members | 47% | 16% | 16% | 21% | +31% |

Matt Hancock

| Date(s) conducted | Polling organisation/client | Sample size | Strong | Weak | Neither | Don't know | Net approval |
|---|---|---|---|---|---|---|---|
| 10–16 May 2019 | YouGov | 858 Conservative members | 12% | 32% | 18% | 39% | –20% |

Penny Mordaunt

| Date(s) conducted | Polling organisation/client | Sample size | Strong | Weak | Neither | Don't know | Net approval |
|---|---|---|---|---|---|---|---|
| 10–16 May 2019 | YouGov | 858 Conservative members | 31% | 19% | 17% | 33% | +12% |
| 5–8 Jul 2018 | YouGov | Conservative members | 21% | 20% | 15% | 43% | +1% |

Andrea Leadsom

| Date(s) conducted | Polling organisation/client | Sample size | Strong | Weak | Neither | Don't know | Net approval |
|---|---|---|---|---|---|---|---|
| 10–16 May 2019 | YouGov | 858 Conservative members | 35% | 31% | 17% | 17% | +4% |

=== Competence and incompetence ===
Boris Johnson

| Date(s) conducted | Polling organisation/client | Sample size | Competent | Incompetent | Neither | Don't know | Net perceived competence |
|---|---|---|---|---|---|---|---|
| 21–22 July 2019 | YouGov | 546 2017 Conservative voters | 57% | 27% | —N/a | 15% | +30% |
| 21–22 July 2019 | YouGov | 1,655 British adults | 29% | 53% | —N/a | 19% | –24% |
| 18–20 June 2019 | Opinium | 1,919 British adults | 30% | 47% | —N/a | 23% | –17% |
| 10–16 May 2019 | YouGov | 858 Conservative members | 61% | 25% | 7% | 8% | +36% |
| 5–8 Jul 2018 | YouGov | Conservative members | 50% | 31% | 11% | 8% | +19% |

Michael Gove

| Date(s) conducted | Polling organisation/client | Sample size | Competent | Incompetent | Neither | Don't know | Net approval |
|---|---|---|---|---|---|---|---|
| 10–16 May 2019 | YouGov | 858 Conservative members | 58% | 25% | 9% | 8% | +33% |
| 5–8 Jul 2018 | YouGov | Conservative members | 65% | 19% | 9% | 8% | +46% |

Sajid Javid

| Date(s) conducted | Polling organisation/client | Sample size | Competent | Incompetent | Neither | Don't know | Net approval |
|---|---|---|---|---|---|---|---|
| 10–16 May 2019 | YouGov | 858 Conservative members | 57% | 15% | 14% | 14% | +42% |
| 5–8 Jul 2018 | YouGov | Conservative members | 69% | 11% | 9% | 8% | +58% |

Jeremy Hunt

| Date(s) conducted | Polling organisation/client | Sample size | Competent | Incompetent | Neither | Don't know | Net approval |
|---|---|---|---|---|---|---|---|
| 18–20 June 2019 | Opinium | 1,919 British adults | 30% | 36% | —N/a | 34% | –6% |
| 10–16 May 2019 | YouGov | 858 Conservative members | 50% | 22% | 14% | 14% | +28% |
| 5–8 Jul 2018 | YouGov | Conservative members | 48% | 24% | 15% | 13% | +24% |

Dominic Raab

| Date(s) conducted | Polling organisation/client | Sample size | Competent | Incompetent | Neither | Don't know | Net approval |
|---|---|---|---|---|---|---|---|
| 10–16 May 2019 | YouGov | 858 Conservative members | 56% | 12% | 11% | 20% | +44% |

Rory Stewart

| Date(s) conducted | Polling organisation/client | Sample size | Competent | Incompetent | Neither | Don't know | Net approval |
|---|---|---|---|---|---|---|---|
| 10–16 May 2019 | YouGov | 858 Conservative members | 27% | 21% | 16% | 36% | +6% |

Penny Mordaunt

| Date(s) conducted | Polling organisation/client | Sample size | Competent | Incompetent | Neither | Don't know | Net approval |
|---|---|---|---|---|---|---|---|
| 10–16 May 2019 | YouGov | 858 Conservative members | 41% | 11% | 15% | 33% | +30% |
| 5–8 Jul 2018 | YouGov | Conservative members | 32% | 12% | 14% | 41% | +20% |

Andrea Leadsom

| Date(s) conducted | Polling organisation/client | Sample size | Competent | Incompetent | Neither | Don't know | Net approval |
|---|---|---|---|---|---|---|---|
| 10–16 May 2019 | YouGov | 858 Conservative members | 48% | 21% | 14% | 17% | +27% |

Matt Hancock

| Date(s) conducted | Polling organisation/client | Sample size | Competent | Incompetent | Neither | Don't know | Net approval |
|---|---|---|---|---|---|---|---|
| 10–16 May 2019 | YouGov | 858 Conservative members | 24% | 17% | 21% | 38% | +7% |
