= BBC News at Five =

Hour-long daily news programme broadcast at 17:00 on BBC News

- Final title card, used from 2019 to 2020
- Created by: BBC News
- Presented by: Huw Edwards
- Theme music composer: David Lowe
- Country of origin: United Kingdom
- Original language: English

Production
- Production locations: Studio A or C, Broadcasting House, London
- Running time: 60 minutes

Original release
- Network: BBC News
- Release: 3 April 2006 – 13 March 2020

Related
- Verified Live

The BBC News at Five is an hour-long daily news programme which was broadcast at 5:00 pm on BBC News between 2006 and 2020. The programme was fronted by Huw Edwards, who at the time was the BBC's lead presenter for major breaking news. Gavin Esler or Jane Hill presented the show on a Friday. The show included a detailed look at the news, as well as analysis with guests and sport and weather updates.

The programme was placed on an indefinite hiatus as a result of the COVID-19 pandemic. The final edition of the BBC News at Five was broadcast on 13 March 2020.

== History ==
The programme started on 3 April 2006 as part of the BBC's relaunch of BBC News presenters, which saw the introduction of the new flagship programme to compete against Jeremy Thompson's Live at Five programme on rival channel Sky News, and to improve BBC News ratings for the hour.

As part of the 2008 news revamp, the show moved studios within BBC Television Centre along with BBC News and the BBC News at One and BBC News at Ten bulletins. The show originally broadcast from Studio N8 but moved to Studio N6.

On 18 March 2013, the programme moved to Broadcasting House along with BBC News and the BBC One bulletins. Unlike most other BBC News Channel bulletins, the BBC News at Five was presented from Studio C, which was usually the main studio for BBC World News.

On 4 November 2013, the BBC News at Five received new opening titles featuring the broadcast hour.

On 13 March 2020, the last edition of the BBC News at Five was broadcast until further notice in light of the COVID-19 pandemic. The UK Government's daily press conference on the pandemic was broadcast in place of BBC News at Five on BBC One and the BBC News Channel.

== Outside broadcasts ==
As well as presenting from the studio, the main presenters were called upon to present on location when major stories broke. For example, Huw Edwards presented live from the BBC's Washington Studio for the 2008, 2012 and 2016 US Presidential Elections and presented live from Basra from the withdrawal ceremony. George Alagiah presented from L'Aquila in April 2009 and Haiti in January 2010 when earthquakes struck the countries. During the 2015 Election campaign Edwards presented from across the UK, while Gavin Esler was based in Edinburgh and Clive Myrie served as the London presenter.

== Presenters ==
If there is no position before the years of being a presenter, then this newsreader was either a relief presenter or occasional guest stand-in presenter.

- Huw Edwards (Main presenter, 2006–2020)
- Gavin Esler (Deputy presenter, 2006–2017)
- Jane Hill (Deputy presenter, 2017–2020)
- Ben Brown (2006–2020)
- Louise Minchin (2006–2011)
- Peter Sissons (2006–2009)
- Julian Worricker (2006–2020)
- Emily Maitlis (2007–2016)
- Nicholas Owen (2008–2017)
- Tim Willcox (2008–2015)
- Joanna Gosling (2009–2010)
- Jon Sopel (2009–2012)
- Clive Myrie (2010–2020)
- Zeinab Badawi (2011)
- Sophie Long (2011–2012)
- Annita McVeigh (2013–2017)
- Matthew Price (2015)
- Maxine Mawhinney (2015–2016)
- Simon McCoy (2015–2019)
- Christian Fraser (2016–2020)
- Reeta Chakrabarti (2017–2020)
- Shaun Ley (2017–2020)
- Martine Croxall (2018–2020)
- Carrie Gracie (2018–2020)
- Rebecca Jones (2018–2020)
- Carole Walker (2018–2019)

== Format ==
Generally the programme followed a standard format as follows –

- 5:00 pm – Headlines
- 5:00 pm to 5:15 pm – Stories
- 5:15 pm – Headlines
- 5:15 pm to 5:25 pm – Interview, in-depth analysis
- 5:25 pm to 5:30 pm – Weather
- 5:30 pm – Headlines
- 5:30 pm to 5:45 pm – Stories with sports round-up (except on Friday)
- 5:45 pm – Headlines (except on Friday for a look ahead to Sportsday)
- 5:45 pm to 5:55 pm – Interview, in-depth analysis (except on Friday for The Film Review)
- 5:55 pm to 6:00 pm – Weather

The weather updates were generally presented from the screen away from the main desk. Sports updates were presented from the BBC Sport Centre at MediaCityUK, Salford. The Film Review appeared during the programme on Fridays between 5:45 pm and 6:00 pm, and is presented by, usually, Gavin Esler or Jane Hill and a film critic, usually Mark Kermode, from the main desk, however the background and lighting changes to resemble a cinema effect. It featured reviews of all the week's main releases.
