= Gavin Esler =

Scottish journalist and TV presenter

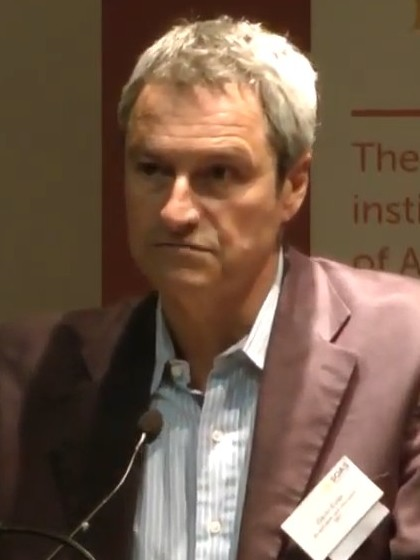
- Esler in 2013
- Born: 27 February 1953 (age 73); Glasgow, Scotland
- Education: University of Kent (BA); University of Leeds (MA)
- Occupations: Journalist; television presenter; author
- Employer: BBC News (1977–2018)
- Notable credits: Newsnight; Dateline London; The Film Review; BBC News at Five; BBC Weekend News
- Political party: Change UK (2019); Independent (2019–present)
- Spouses: Patricia Warner (m. 1979; div. 2010) Anna Phoebe (m. 2012)
- Children: 4
- Website: gavinesler.substack.com

Gavin William James Esler (born 27 February 1953) is a Scottish journalist, television presenter and author. He was a main presenter on BBC Two's flagship political analysis programme, Newsnight, from January 2003 until January 2014, and presenter of BBC News at Five on the BBC News Channel. From 2014 to 2023 he served as the Chancellor of the University of Kent. On 11 March 2017, Esler confirmed via his Twitter profile that he would be leaving the BBC at the end of the month to concentrate on his writing activities. He returned to the BBC later that year as host of Talking Books.

He stood unsuccessfully as a candidate for Change UK in London at the 2019 European Parliament election.

== Early life ==
Esler was born in Glasgow on 27 February 1953, the first son born to a manager of a building company. During his first weeks, he suffered from a condition that made him unable to digest milk and his parents feared for his life. He had an operation at just three weeks old. His family lived in Clydebank before they moved to Edinburgh, where he began his education at Duddingston Primary School before gaining a scholarship to George Heriot's School at the age of seven.

His Scottish childhood had a profound and long-lasting effect on him. His parents moved to Northern Ireland but he remained in Edinburgh. Esler was the first in his family to go to university, graduating at the University of Kent with a BA in English and American literature in 1974. Alongside his studies he also wrote for Incant, the university newspaper. He then gained an MA in Anglo-Irish literature with distinction from the University of Leeds.

== Journalism career ==
Esler began working as a journalist in 1976, aged 23, as a junior reporter with the Belfast Telegraph.

He joined the BBC in 1977 as Northern Ireland reporter, working under Bernard Cornwell, and extended his role after joining Newsnight in 1982. Esler was appointed Washington correspondent in 1989 and then, a year later, became the BBC's chief North America correspondent. Based in Washington, Esler's responsibilities now extended to shaping the corporation's coverage across the whole of North America, which included reporting on both the earlier George H. W. Bush and Clinton administrations. Esler has also reported for news and documentary programmes across Europe, Russia, China and North and South America.

Esler combined reporting with presenting from the mid-1980s on BBC One's regional news programme for London and the South East of England – Newsroom South East. He worked as an anchor on the BBC News channel (at the time known as "BBC News 24") from its outset in 1997 and co-presented its prime-time slot with Sian Williams for several years.

In January 2003, he joined Newsnight, replacing Jeremy Vine, who had left to take over from Sir Jimmy Young on Radio 2. During his career Esler has interviewed heads of state and government including Bill Clinton, Jacques Chirac and King Abdullah II of Jordan. He has also interviewed a wide range of cultural figures, including Dolly Parton, Doris Lessing, Penélope Cruz, Angelina Jolie, V. S. Naipaul, Roger Waters, Vikram Seth and Seamus Heaney. Esler left Newsnight in January 2014, and was replaced by Laura Kuenssberg.

In 2005, Esler interviewed George Galloway on Newsnight about the London bombings. The BBC was reported to have received hundreds of complaints about his interview alleging his questioning was "rude and aggressive". Peter Barron, editor of Newsnight, defended the questioning of Galloway's tactics:

The thrust of Gavin's questioning was to ask if it was wise to express these (Galloway's) provocative views – effectively 'I told you so' – at a time when many politicians and Muslim leaders had been appealing for calm. I believe that was a fair and appropriate line of questioning.

In 2007 a BBC Trust publication investigating impartiality in the organisation criticised an unnamed BBC news presenter for writing an article in the Daily Mirror newspaper entitled "Why the World Needs Hillary", stating they had been "unwise" for doing so. The article appeared to endorse Hillary Clinton to be the next US President and it soon emerged that the news presenter in question was Esler. The BBC report noted that "the apparent endorsement of one presidential candidate in elections in a country which, in his words, 'now seems seriously off course' could make it hard for that presenter to conduct American political interviews".

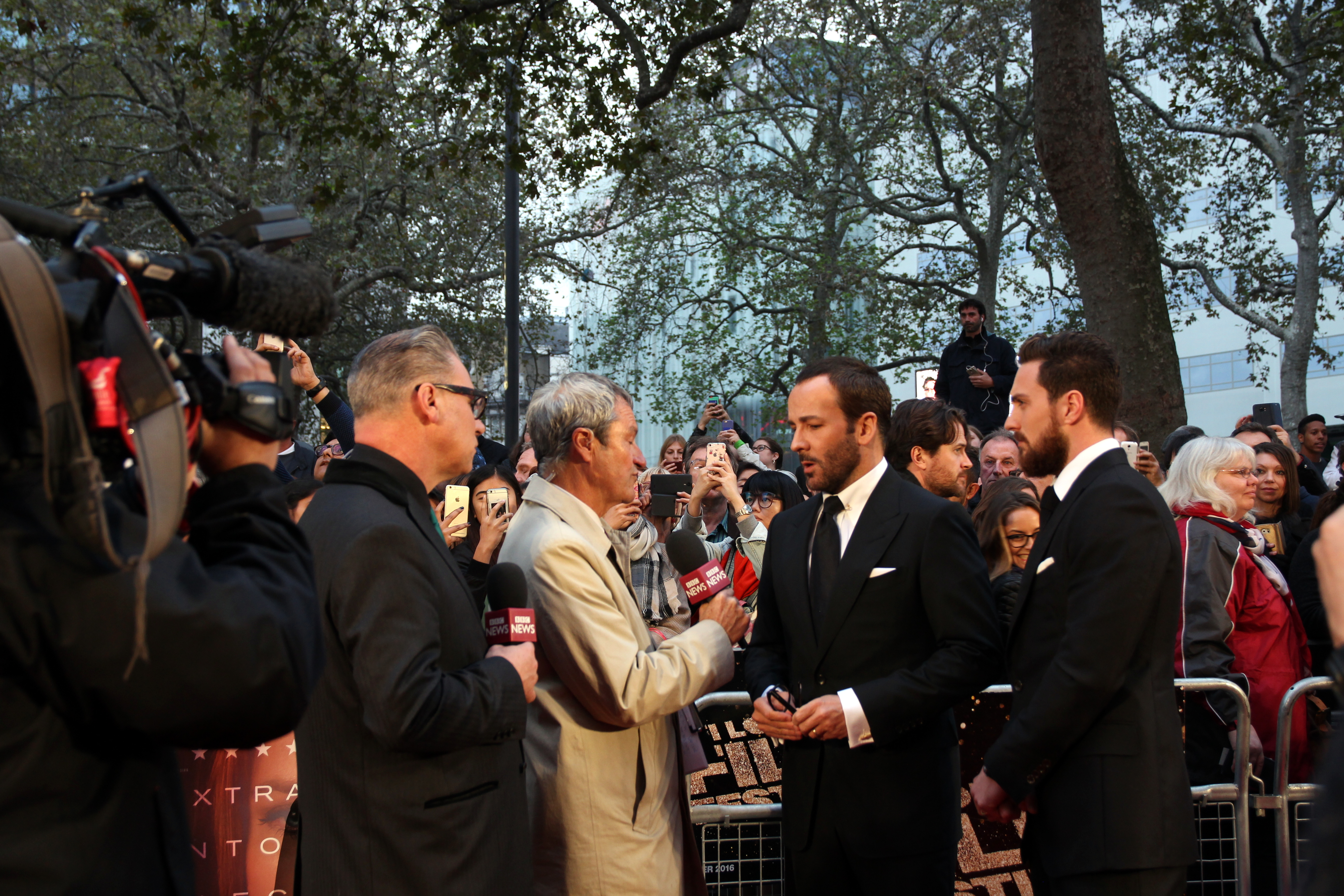
Left to right: Mark Kermode and Esler interview Tom Ford and Aaron Taylor-Johnson at the premiere of Nocturnal Animals

Until 2017, Esler was the main presenter of Dateline London on BBC News and BBC World News most Sunday mornings at 11 am. Between 2008 and 2017, he also presented the BBC News at Five on the BBC News channel on Fridays and when Huw Edwards was away. Esler has also hosted BBC Radio 4 factual series Four Corners along with fellow Scottish broadcaster Anne MacKenzie. He had a regular slot on Saturdays and Sundays, working across BBC World, BBC News and BBC One, and co-presented the regular Film Review with Mark Kermode.

On 11 March 2017, Esler confirmed via his Twitter profile that he would be leaving the BBC to concentrate on his writing activities. The Film Review was presented by other presenters although he continued to present Dateline London. He returned on 31 March 2017 to present his final BBC News at Five and Film Review. He returned to the BBC later that year as host of Talking Books.

Since 2021 Esler has been a regular presenter and contributor to the political podcast The Bunker.. Since 2023 he has presented the podcast This Is Not A Drill.

== Literary career ==
Esler is the author of five novels and four non-fiction books. The novel A Scandalous Man was described by fellow author Bernard Cornwell as "a compelling book, its political sophistication made luminous with wisdom, sympathy and story telling". His fifth novel, Powerplay, was published by HarperCollins in August 2009. Esler's first non-fiction book, The United States of Anger published in October 1997 by Penguin, explores America's discontent with itself and was described by the New Statesman as "a vivid portrait of America in the 1990s". Esler's 2019 book Brexit Without the Bullshit discusses some of the potential consequences of the UK's withdrawal from the European Union. For several years he also wrote regular columns for The Scotsman, The Independent and other publications..

Esler's most recent book, How Britain Ends - English Nationalism and the Re-birth of Four Nations, was published in February 2021 and in which Esler claims a resurgent English nationalism is pulling the United Kingdom apart.

== Political career ==
In August 2018, Esler spoke at a People's Vote rally in Edinburgh. People's Vote is a campaign group calling for a public vote on the final Brexit deal between the UK and the European Union. On 23 April 2019, he was announced as a candidate for Change UK in London in the May 2019 European Parliament election. The party announced its intention to stop Brexit and pursue a second referendum on membership of the EU. It gained 3.4% of the vote nationally and failed to win any seats. In London the party achieved 5.3% of the vote, but this was only just over half of the number required for Esler as lead candidate to win the 8th and last seat under the d'Hondt system of proportional representation used in the election.

In an interview with the Huffington Post, published on 6 May 2019, Esler stated that, "I want to stop Brexit. Fix Britain. And then I want to reform the things that are wrong with the EU". He added, that he thought Nigel Farage was "affable" and a "good communicator", but whilst he was "more honest on that than many other politicians who support Brexit", his approach was reminiscent of Nazism; "The word 'betrayal' was used in Germany from 1919 onwards and throughout the 1920s with terrible results".

Esler has criticised the way the BBC and other TV and radio news has handled balance. He states that the present mode of balance involves "if you have a Tory on you get a Labour Party person", but says that "that's not what politics is like anymore". He criticises giving equal balance to "someone who really knows what they are talking about" and "someone who is essentially the village idiot".

In August 2021 it was announced that Esler would be a competitor on BBC's Celebrity MasterChef. He left the competition during a quarter-final "after serving up an ‘incomplete’ dessert compared to ‘soup’."

== Personal life ==
Esler has been married to rock violinist Anna Phoebe, his second wife, since 2012. They have two children and live in Deal, Kent. He was first married in July 1979, to teacher Patricia Warner, and they had two children together. The couple's separation was reported in 2008 and a divorce granted in 2010.

Esler's hobbies include camping, hiking and skiing. He is a fan of progressive rock, citing King Crimson, Jethro Tull, Colosseum and Pink Floyd as favourite bands, and presented Prog magazine's Progressive Music Awards for three consecutive years between September 2012 and 2014.

== Awards and honours ==
Esler's report on the military build-up in the Aleutian Islands as part of the Reagan administration's New Maritime Strategy earned him a Royal Television Society award.

In 2007 he won a Sony Gold Award for his radio documentary report Letters from Guantanamo on Sami al-Hajj, one of the detainees in Guantanamo Bay. Following the broadcast, al-Hajj was released from American custody.

Esler has received two honorary degrees from the University of Kent: an honorary MA was awarded in 1995, followed by an honorary Doctorate in Civil Law in 2005. He was installed as the sixth Chancellor of the university in July 2014.

== Bibliography ==
Esler has written the following books:

=== Non-fiction ===
- The United States of Anger. Penguin. 1998. ISBN 978-0-14-026927-7.
- Lessons from the Top: The three universal stories that all successful leaders tell. Profile. 2013. ISBN 978-1-84668-500-2.
- Brexit Without the Bullshit. Canbury Press. 2019. ISBN 978-1-912454-35-8.
- How Britain Ends - English Nationalism and the Re-birth of Four Nations. Head of Zeus. 2021. ISBN 978-1-80024-105-3
- Britain Is Better Than This: Why a Great Country is Failing Us Apollo 2023.ISBN 978-1-80454-772-4

=== Fiction ===
- Loyalties. Headline. 1991. ISBN 978-0-7472-3438-8.
- Deep Blue. HarperCollins. 1992. ISBN 978-0-00-647275-9.
- The Blood Brother. HarperCollins. 1996. ISBN 978-0-00-649304-4.
- A Scandalous Man. HarperCollins. 2008. ISBN 978-0-00-728091-9.
- Power Play. HarperCollins. 2010. ISBN 978-0-00-727811-4.

Media offices
Preceded by Jeremy Vine	BBC Newsnight presenter 2003–2014 with Jeremy Paxman, Emily Maitlis and Kirsty Wark	Succeeded by Laura Kuenssberg
Preceded by New Post	Friday presenter of BBC News at Five (BBC News Channel); 2008 – 2017	Incumbent
Academic offices
Preceded by Sir Robert Worcester	Chancellor of the University of Kent; 2014 – 2024	Succeeded by YolanDa Brown
