= Anna Smith (critic) =

English broadcaster and film critic

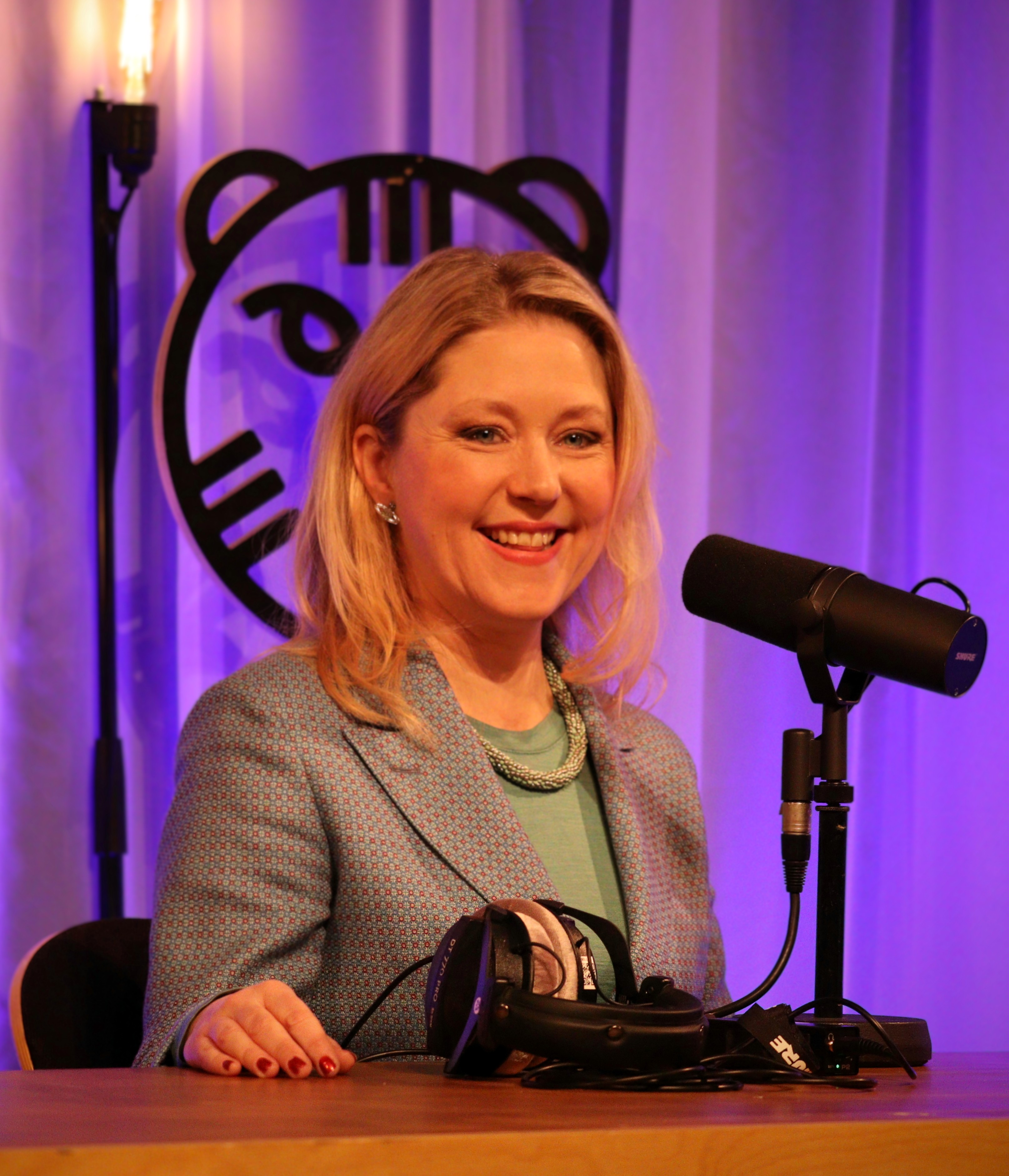
Anna Smith at the IFFR 2023

Anna Smith is an English film reporter, former chair of the London Film Critics' Circle, and host of the Girls on Film podcast. She has contributed to the BBC, Sky News, Time Out, the Guardian and The Film Review.

== Biography ==
Smith studied journalism at the University of Wales Cardiff, worked on various magazines in the 1990s, including being launch editor of a dance music magazine called Wax, and started to do film reviews while assistant editor of Minx. After Minx closed in July 2000, Smith focussed on freelance film writing.

In 2014 Smith was chair of the London Film Critics' Circle, and President of their Critics' Circle.

Smith started the Girls on Film podcast in 2018. Guests have included Caitlin Moran and Coky Giedroyc, Kitty Green, Haifaa al-Mansour, Gurinder Chadha and Brie Larson.
