= The Film Review =

- Also known as: Film 24 (until 2013)
- Presented by: Gavin Esler; Jane Hill; Stand-in presenters: Ben Brown; Martine Croxall; Victoria Derbyshire
- Starring: Film critic: Mark Kermode; Stand-in critics: Anna Smith; Jason Solomons; James King
- Theme music composer: David Lowe
- Country of origin: United Kingdom
- Original language: English

Production
- Production locations: Studio C, Broadcasting House, London
- Running time: 10 minutes

Original release
- Network: BBC News
- Release: 15 October 2022

Related
- BBC News at Five; The Film Show

The Film Review (formerly Film 24) is a ten-minute film-related programme that was usually shown on BBC News each Friday evening at 5:45 pm. It reviewed three new films each week and was repeated several times during weekends.

Jane Hill served as the main host, having taken over the position when Gavin Esler left as a BBC News channel presenter. Mark Kermode was the regular film critic. However, during the COVID-19 pandemic restrictions, the programme was presented exclusively by the film critic alone. It concentrated on home streaming releases as cinemas have been closed but, from 24 July 2020, began to include cinema theatrical releases again. From 10 September 2021, The Film Review returned to the BBC studios and its regular format for the first time since the COVID-19 pandemic began.

The programme was renamed The Film Review on 22 March 2013, following BBC News 24's rebranding to BBC News and its move to Broadcasting House. The relief presenter when Kermode could not present was Anna Smith. Other film critic stand-ins included Jason Solomons and James King.

The show was axed by the BBC and, like Dateline London, ended in mid-October 2022. The final episode was broadcast on 15 October 2022.
