= The Sixth Form Bolton =

College in Bolton, UK

Coordinates: 53.600°N 2.455°W

- Established: 1982
- Administrative staff: 32
- Students: 1700
- Location: Bolton, England, UK
- Website: www.bolton-sfc.ac.uk

The Sixth Form Bolton, formerly Bolton Sixth Form College, is a further education college for students aged 16–19 and is located in Bolton, Greater Manchester, England.

== Overview ==
The Sixth Form Bolton is the largest further education college in the Metropolitan Borough of Bolton. The college has around 1700 full-time students.

== History ==
This college is the result of the merger of Bolton North and Bolton South Colleges in the late 1990s to form a single Sixth Form College. Today the college is located on Deane Road in Bolton. This campus opened in September 2010 and replaced the former North campus, which was situated on Smithills Dean Road. The college also previously had a second campus located on Queen Street in Farnworth. This campus opened in July 2008 and replaced the former South campus on Lever Edge Lane in Daubhill. However the college closed its Farnworth Campus in September 2014.

== Notable alumni ==
- Sajid Mahmood, Lancashire and England cricketer
- Clive Myrie, BBC newsreader
- Matthew Walton, Clarinet Virtuoso
