= Jane Hill =

British newsreader

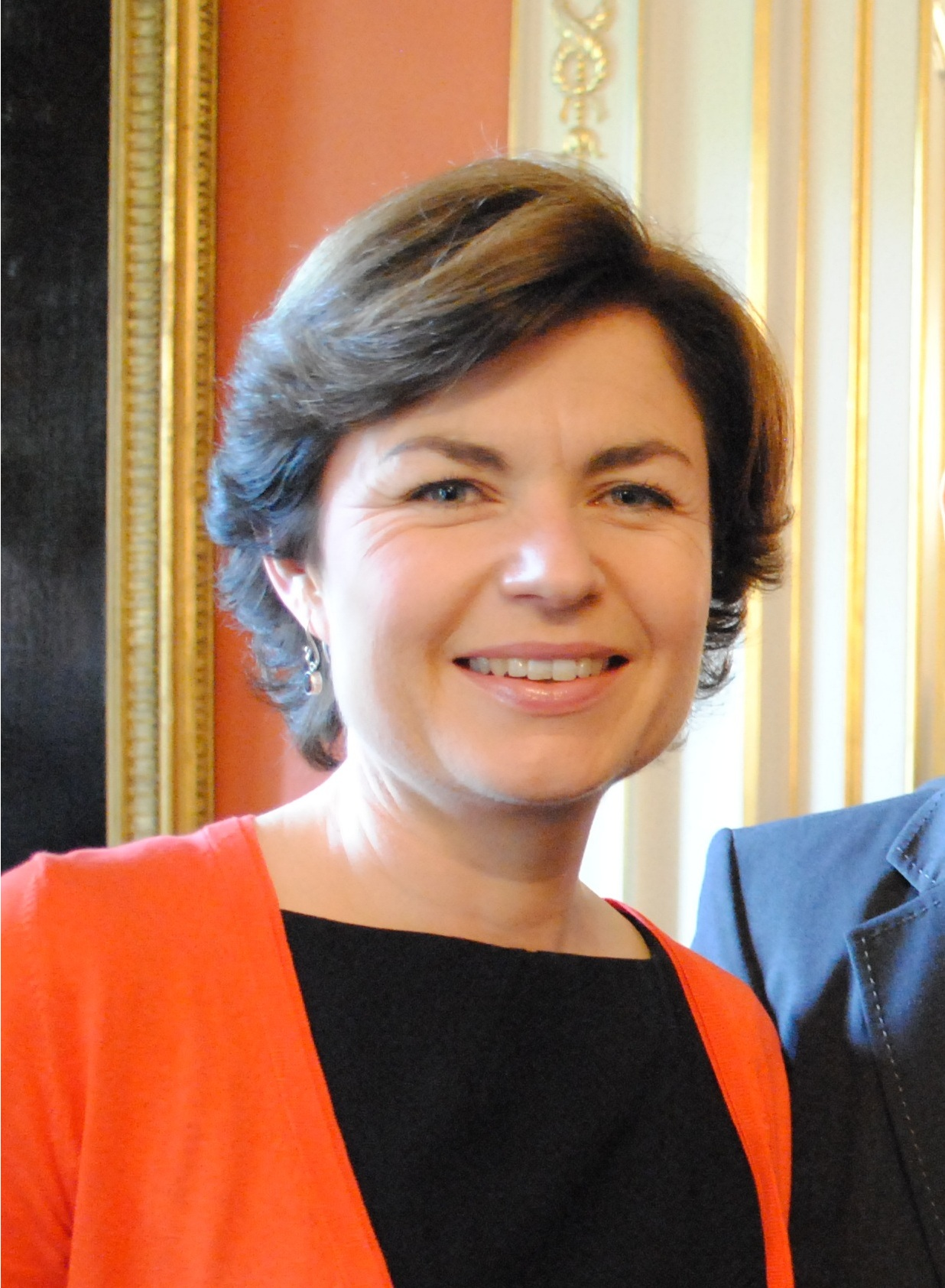
- Jane Hill in 2011
- Born: Jane Amanda Hill; 10 June 1969 (age 57); Eastbourne, Sussex, England
- Education: Queen Mary and Westfield College, University of London
- Occupations: Journalist, Presenter, Newsreader
- Years active: 1986–present
- Notable credits: BBC News; BBC News at Five; The Film Review; BBC Breakfast; Dateline London; BBC News at One; BBC News at Six; BBC News at Ten
- Spouse: Sara Shepherd (m. 2013)

Jane Amanda Hill (born 10 June 1969 in Eastbourne, Sussex) is an English newsreader and journalist for the BBC. She is one of the corporation’s main network anchors, regularly presenting the BBC Weekend News, BBC News at Ten and BBC News at Six. She also presents The World Tonight on BBC Radio 4 and Newshour on the BBC World Service.

== Early life ==
Jane Amanda Hill was born on 10 June 1969 in Eastbourne, Sussex. She was privately educated at Micklefield School in East Sussex. She went on to study politics at Queen Mary and Westfield College, University of London, and graduated in 1991 with a Bachelor of Arts (BA) degree.

She worked part-time for local BBC Radio in paid and voluntary positions from 1986 to 1991. Her first job was at a local radio station as a junior music correspondent, but she knew little about the local indie bands. After graduating, she worked as an assistant and researcher to Senate Democrats, at the Democratic National Headquarters in Washington. She joined the BBC full-time at the end of 1991.

== Career ==
After completing the BBC journalism training programme, Hill joined BBC Radio 5 Live at the station's launch, remaining there as a producer for 18 months. She moved into television following completion of the BBC Regional News Trainee Scheme. She went on to join BBC Radio Berkshire and South Today as a presenter, before moving later to national news.

When BBC News launched its new 24-hour channel in November 1997, Hill joined, and was originally an overnight presenter, also appearing on the channel's international counterpart BBC World News during the simulcast between the two channels. During her time with BBC News, she has presented coverage of a wide range of stories and events, including a week of special programmes from Washington DC in the aftermath of the terrorist attacks of 11 September 2001. She also went on to present live coverage on BBC News and BBC World News of the first anniversary commemorations at Ground zero in New York City.

She presented numerous special programmes on BBC One and BBC Two during the war in Iraq, and in December 2003, on the day US forces captured Saddam Hussein, she broadcast for nearly eight hours continuously on both terrestrial channels, BBC News, and BBC World News.

Hill led the local reporting in Portugal in 2007, for the BBC's coverage of the disappearance of Madeleine McCann. Flying to Portugal the day the news broke, she spent much of May there, and conducted the first televised interview with Kate and Gerry McCann. She returned to the Algarve for all the major developments in the story, and made a half-hour documentary about the case at the end of that year.

From April 2006 until August 2014, she presented alongside Matthew Amroliwala between 11:00 and 14:00 until they moved to between 14:00 and 17:00 in March 2013. Previously, she presented with Chris Eakin from 19:00 to 22:00 on Monday to Thursday evenings. Hill also presents news bulletins on BBC One, and in the past has made occasional appearances presenting BBC Breakfast. She is an occasional relief presenter for the BBC Weekend News on BBC One.

Hill returned as relief presenter for BBC News at Six and also joined the team of relief presenters for BBC News at Ten from August 2014.

She appeared as herself in the 2014 science fiction action film Edge of Tomorrow, which features Tom Cruise and Emily Blunt. She is a vocal advocate of LGBT+ rights, becoming a columnist for Diva in 2016.

With The World Tonight ending in 2027, it was announced Hill would become a main presenter of its successor BBC Newshour airing also at 14:00 weekdays and 13:00 weekends on the BBC World Service.

== Personal life ==
In December 2009, Hill revealed in the BBC's corporation magazine Ariel that she is a lesbian. Hill lives with her wife Sara, whom she married in 2013 in north London. She has spoken on several occasions about the importance of LGBTQ+ representation on television and the under-representation of gay women.

Hill is a member of the British-American Project, an organisation which exists to promote Anglo-American relations.
