= Clive Myrie =

British journalist, newsreader, and presenter (born 1964)

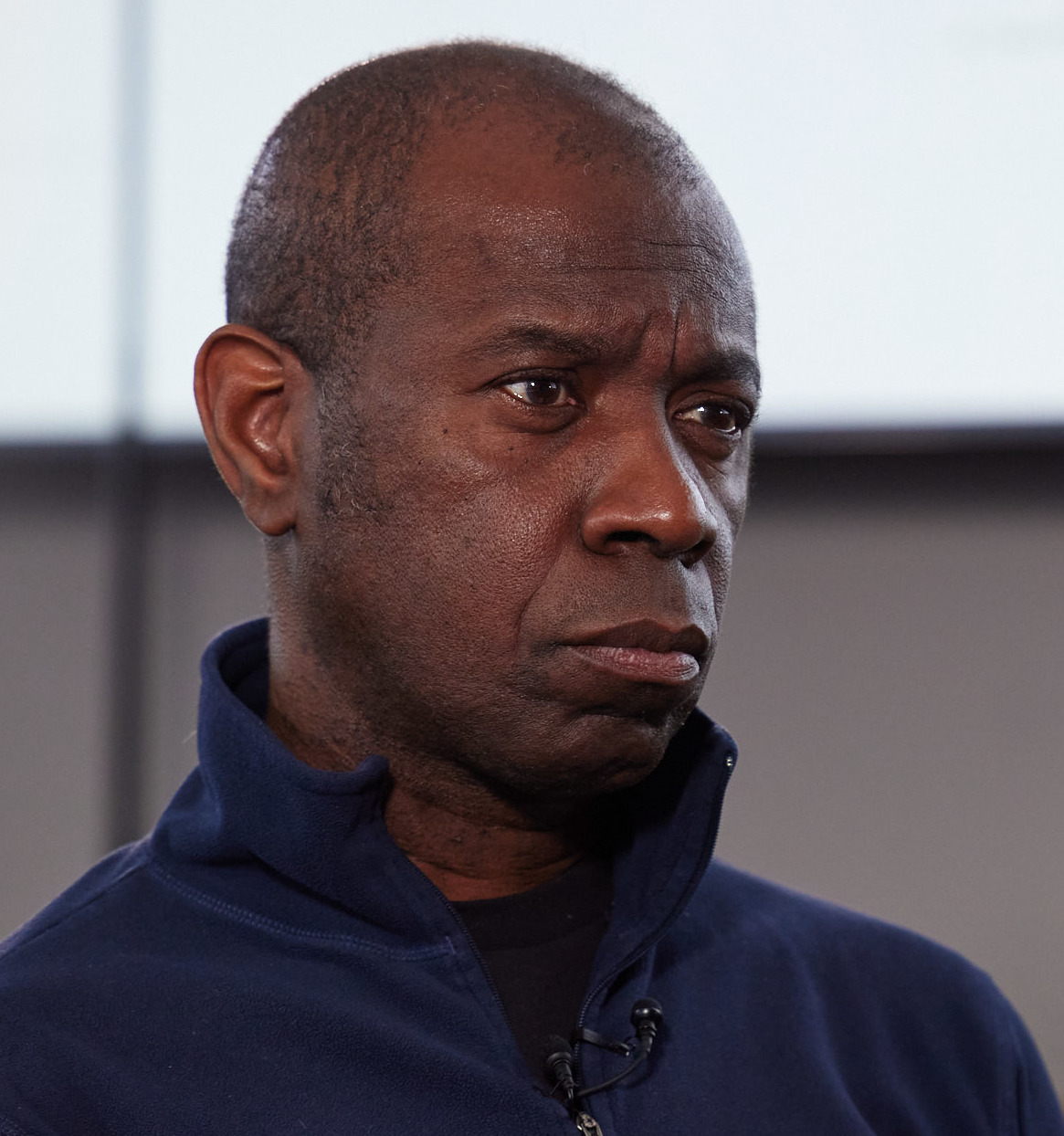
- Myrie interviewing Volodymyr Zelenskyy, President of Ukraine, 2022
- Born: Clive Augustus Myrie; 25 August 1964 (age 62); Farnworth, Lancashire, England
- Education: University of Sussex (LLB)
- Occupations: Journalist, chief presenter
- Years active: 1987-present
- Employer: BBC
- Notable credit(s): BBC News, BBC News at Five, BBC News at Ten, BBC News at Six, Beyond 100 Days, Mastermind
- Spouse: Catherine Barry (m. 1998)
- Family: Jorden Myrie (nephew)

Clive Augustus Myrie (born 25 August 1964) is a British journalist, newsreader and chief presenter for the BBC. He is one of the channel's chief news presenters and correspondents, as well as its election results presenter. Since August 2021, he has been the host of the long-running BBC quiz shows Mastermind and Celebrity Mastermind. He has hosted various travel shows including a series on his adventures in Africa in 2026.

In 2024, Myrie was named Chancellor of the University of the Arts London.

== Early life ==
Clive Augustus Myrie was born on 25 August 1964 in Farnworth, Lancashire, England, to Jamaican immigrant parents, who came to the United Kingdom in the 1960s. He is one of seven children. His mother was a seamstress who worked for Mary Quant, while his father Norris was a factory worker who made car batteries and carpets.

Myrie was educated at Hayward Grammar School in the Great Lever area of Bolton, followed by Bolton Sixth Form College, where he completed his A-levels. He graduated from the University of Sussex with a Bachelor of Laws degree in 1985.

== Career ==
Myrie joined the BBC in 1987 as a trainee local radio reporter, on the Corporation's graduate journalism programme. His first assignment was as a reporter for BBC Radio Bristol in 1988, returning to the BBC after a year with Independent Radio News. He then reported for Points West and, later, BBC Television and Radio News.

In 1996, he became a BBC foreign correspondent and has since reported from more than 90 countries. He initially became the BBC's Tokyo correspondent, and was then the Los Angeles correspondent from 1997 to 1999. He was appointed BBC Asia Correspondent in 2002 and was Paris correspondent from 2006 to 2007. His career has encompassed major stories such as the impeachment of U.S. President Bill Clinton, and wars in Kosovo, Afghanistan and Iraq. During the invasion of Iraq by coalition forces in March 2003, Myrie was an embedded correspondent with 40 Commando Royal Marines, joining them initially on HMS Ocean and subsequently during operations on the Al-Faw Peninsula. Due to the danger this particular assignment posed, Myrie had to write a "goodbye" letter to his family, in case of his death.

After serving as Europe correspondent based in Brussels, he was appointed a presenter on the BBC News Channel in April 2009, replacing the retired Chris Lowe. Since joining BBC News, Myrie has presented the BBC Weekend News and weekend editions of BBC News at Ten and BBC Breakfast, both on BBC One. In June 2014, he began presenting weekday bulletins on BBC One.

In September 2010, Myrie broke the story that the Basque separatist group ETA had declared a unilateral ceasefire after he met an ETA operative in Paris, who handed over a tape of the organisation's leaders making the declaration.

He has presented the 18:30-to-midnight slot, Monday to Thursday, on the BBC News Channel. During the 2015 general election, he was the main presenter of Election Tonight at 19:30 and 21:30. Since 2019, Myrie has focused on BBC One network bulletins with the evening shift presented by a set of relief presenters, until it merged with BBC World News, but can still present and report on the channel during major breaking news or on location, such as during the 2022 Russian invasion of Ukraine, death of Queen Elizabeth II or as their election presenter.

Myrie reported extensively from Kathmandu on the earthquake that struck the city on 25 April 2015, including the rescues of two Nepali citizens who were found alive under two collapsed buildings on 30 April 2015. In October 2017, Myrie visited Bangladesh to report on the Rohingya refugee crisis.

Myrie has occasionally presented on BBC World News, including World News Today, World News America and the 2016 US election. He appeared as a guest on BBC One's Have I Got News for You on 15 April 2016. In September 2017, Myrie appeared as a panellist on Richard Osman's House of Games quiz show. He has also presented with Katty Kay the current affairs programme Beyond 100 Days.

In 2019, Myrie began presenting the BBC News at Six and BBC News at Ten on alternate Fridays with Sophie Raworth following the departure of Fiona Bruce to Question Time.

On 22 March 2021, it was announced that Myrie would become the new host of the flagship BBC Two quiz show Mastermind and its BBC One spin-off show, Celebrity Mastermind, following John Humphrys' decision to leave after 18 years. Myrie made his debut as host on 23 August 2021. In November 2021, he featured as a guest participant in an episode of the BBC Two programme Celebrity Antiques Road Trip with fellow newsreader Reeta Chakrabarti.

Myrie hosted a documentary series on Jazz FM entitled The Definitive History of Jazz In Britain, broadcasting over ten weeks from 4 April to 6 June 2021. He also occasionally presents classical music on BBC Radio 3.

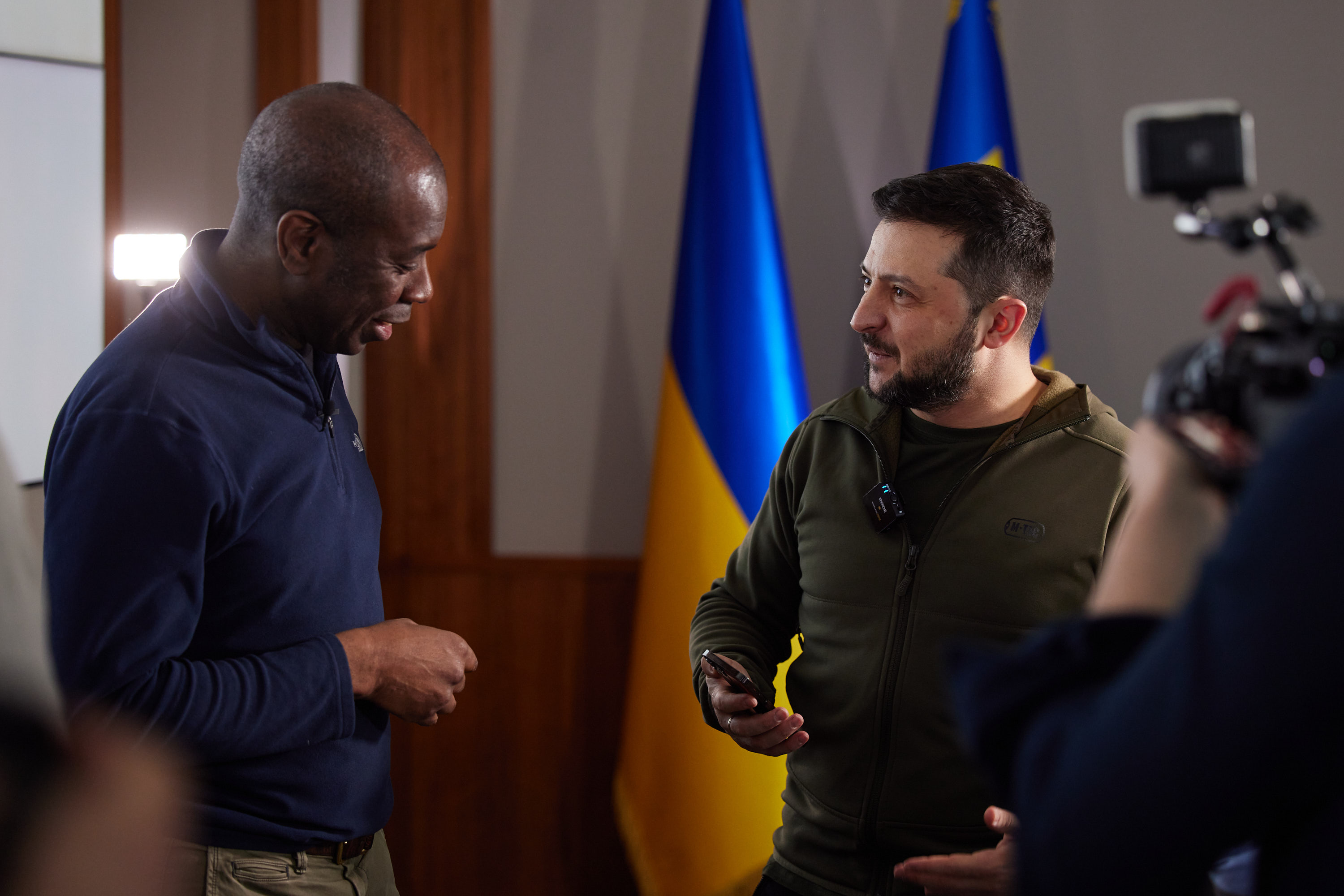
Myrie interviewing President Volodymyr Zelenskyy, April 2022

In February 2022, he travelled to Ukraine and was the anchor for BBC coverage of the 2022 Russian invasion of Ukraine. In one report on the invasion, Myrie stated that he and other journalists were staying in the city as "We all want to tell the story of this war, and we want to tell it accurately."

Myrie also presented part of the coverage of the death of Queen Elizabeth II as well as the Proclamation of accession of Charles III on BBC News and BBC World News.

On 16 June 2023, Myrie hosted Have I Got News for You, for the fourth time, and poked fun at the past seven days' news stories, particularly around former prime minister Boris Johnson. It was later alleged by The Times that Myrie was "pulled" from that night's BBC News At Ten as a result of potential "impartiality accusations". He later said that the two shows had been just "too close" together.

In July 2023, Myrie became the Pro Chancellor of the University of Bolton. He said "The University of Bolton in my home town is one of the most socially inclusive universities in the UK. ... In a world where trade, commerce and culture are becoming ever more connected, your experience of studying in a diverse environment will prove to be a source of strength for many years to come." Myrie is also Chancellor of the University of the Arts London (UAL), and attended his first graduation ceremony in that role at the Royal Festival Hall, London, on 16 July 2024.

He presented Clive Myrie's Italian Road Trip, a travelogue series for the BBC, in 2023. In March 2024, the BBC announced Myrie's second travelogue series Clive Myrie’s Caribbean Adventure would air in 2024. In April 2024, the BBC announced that Myrie's travelogue series Clive Myrie’s African Adventure that aired in January–February 2026 where he visited cities such as Cape Town, Accra and Marrakesh. Clive Myrie’s American Adventure is due to air in 2027.

On 28 May 2024, Myrie was announced as the host of the BBC's election night coverage for the 2024 United Kingdom general election, alongside Laura Kuenssberg. He was also announced as the host for BBC's election night coverage for the 2024 United States presidential election.

== University of the Arts London incident ==
In 2024, Myrie was filmed referring to an incident that occurred during a Q&A session on 25 September at the University of the Arts London (UAL), where he had been recently appointed Chancellor. He was heckled by a pro-Palestine student, whom he later referred to as an "idiot" and a "lunatic" while using expletives.

== Personal life ==
Myrie is married to Mary Catherine Barry, an upholsterer and furniture restorer whose father's family originates from Borrisoleigh, County Tipperary. Myrie met his wife, who then worked in publishing, at the 1992 London launch of a book about Swiss cheeses. The couple married six years later at Corpus Christi Catholic Church in Covent Garden. According to Myrie, she "gave me the courage and space to pursue my dreams." They live in Islington, North London. Myrie said in an interview with The Times that he and his wife initially planned to have children after they were married in 1998, but after a period of trying to conceive they subsequently decided not to become parents.

Myrie is a supporter of Manchester City F.C. He enjoys going to the cinema and his favourite music genre is jazz, which he discovered at university. While at school, he learned to play the violin and the trumpet and played in the local youth orchestra; appearing on Saturday Live in February 2022 his Inheritance Tracks were "Welcome to My World" by Jim Reeves and "So What" by Miles Davis.

Myrie has experienced racist abuse, which has included death threats, and has been the recipient of a card, with a picture of a gorilla on the front, which read: "We don't want people like you on our TV screens." In October 2019, Ian Hargreaves, a 66-year-old man from Leeds, was jailed for 18 months at Leeds Crown Court for sending electronic death threats towards Myrie and motorsport commentator Jack Nicholls; Myrie said in a victim statement that he found the threats "deeply troubling".

Myrie spent four days in hospital in 2019 undergoing surgery to remove a benign tumour from his neck.

In June 2024, Myrie was a guest on BBC Radio 4's Desert Island Discs, choosing "Long, Long Summer" by Dizzy Gillespie, the catalogue for the Metropolitan Museum of Art and some hot pepper sauce as his favourite record, book and luxury item respectively.

Myrie's nephew is actor Jorden Myrie, who appeared in the second series of BBC One drama Sherwood in 2024.

In October 2024, Myrie issued an apology after failing to declare £145,000 earnings from corporate events over the previous year. It was claimed that he failed to include 11 engagements in his list to the BBC. Myrie said he would not be taking part in any more paid external events for "the foreseeable future".

== Awards ==
Myrie has won several nominations for his work, most significantly for his role in the BAFTA-nominated BBC team behind coverage of the Mozambique floods in 2000. He was awarded the Bayeux-Calvados Award for war correspondents for his reporting of ethnic violence on the island of Borneo.

Myrie has received honorary degrees from Staffordshire University (in 2016), the University of Sussex (in 2019), the University of Bolton (in 2022), Edge Hill University (in 2023), the University of the West of Scotland (2024), the University of Oxford (2025) and Kingston University (2025).

In the RTS Television Journalism Awards 2021, Myrie was named both "Television Journalist of the Year" and "Network Presenter of the Year", winning the accolades "for his versatile, measured and compelling style".

== Books ==
- Clive Myrie: The Biography (independently published, July 2023), ISBN 9798853934412
- Everything is Everything: A Memoir of Love, Hate & Hope (Hodder & Stoughton, September 2023), ISBN 9781399714983

Media offices
Preceded by ?	World Affairs Correspondent: BBC News; 1996–?	Incumbent
Preceded by ?	Chief News Presenter: BBC News; 2022–?	Incumbent
Preceded by John Humphrys	Host of Mastermind; 2021–present	Succeeded by Incumbent
Preceded by Huw Edwards as host until 2019	Host of BBC Election Night Coverage; 2024–present	Incumbent
