= Jewin Welsh Presbyterian Chapel =

Church in London, England

- Eglwys Gymraeg Jewin
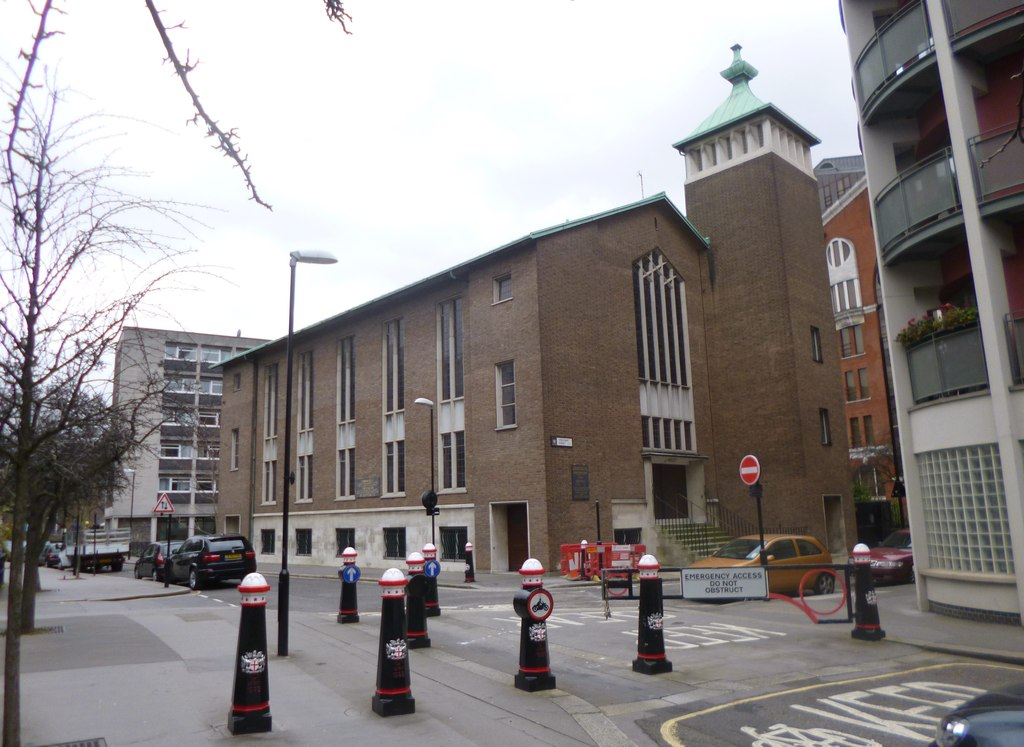

- Location within City of London
- 51°31′18.03″N 0°5′42.86″W
- Location: 70 Fann Street, London, EC1
- Country: England
- Language: Welsh
- Denomination: Presbyterian Church of Wales
- Website: capeljewin.org

History
- Status: Active
- Founded: c. 1774 (original congregation at Cock Lane)

Architecture
- Architect: Caröe & Partners
- Style: New Humanism
- Completed: 1960

Clergy
- Pastor(s): Rev. Richard Brunt. BA, BD, MPhil

The Jewin Welsh Presbyterian Chapel (Welsh: Eglwys Gymraeg Jewin) is a Presbyterian Church of Wales church in the City of London, England.

The current building was opened in 1960 on a site adjoining the Golden Lane Estate. It replaced a chapel built in 1878–1879 that was destroyed in World War II during the air raids in September 1940. The congregation had moved there in 1879 from nearby Jewin Crescent, a site now incorporated into the Barbican. The Jewin Crescent chapel had opened in 1822, following a move from Wilderness Row, Clerkenwell. The first services had taken place in c. 1774 in Cock Lane, Smithfield. The current building was designed by Caroe & Partners in a Swedish-inspired form of modern architecture sometimes called the New Humanism.

After a dramatic fall in the congregation, in 2013 the London-based BBC News presenter Huw Edwards, who occasionally substituted as the chapel's organist, agreed to lead a campaign to save the building and the chapel, to keep the traditions of the London Welsh community alive. The First Minister of Wales, Carwyn Jones, chose the campaign as his input to BBC Wales Today for Children in Need 2013.

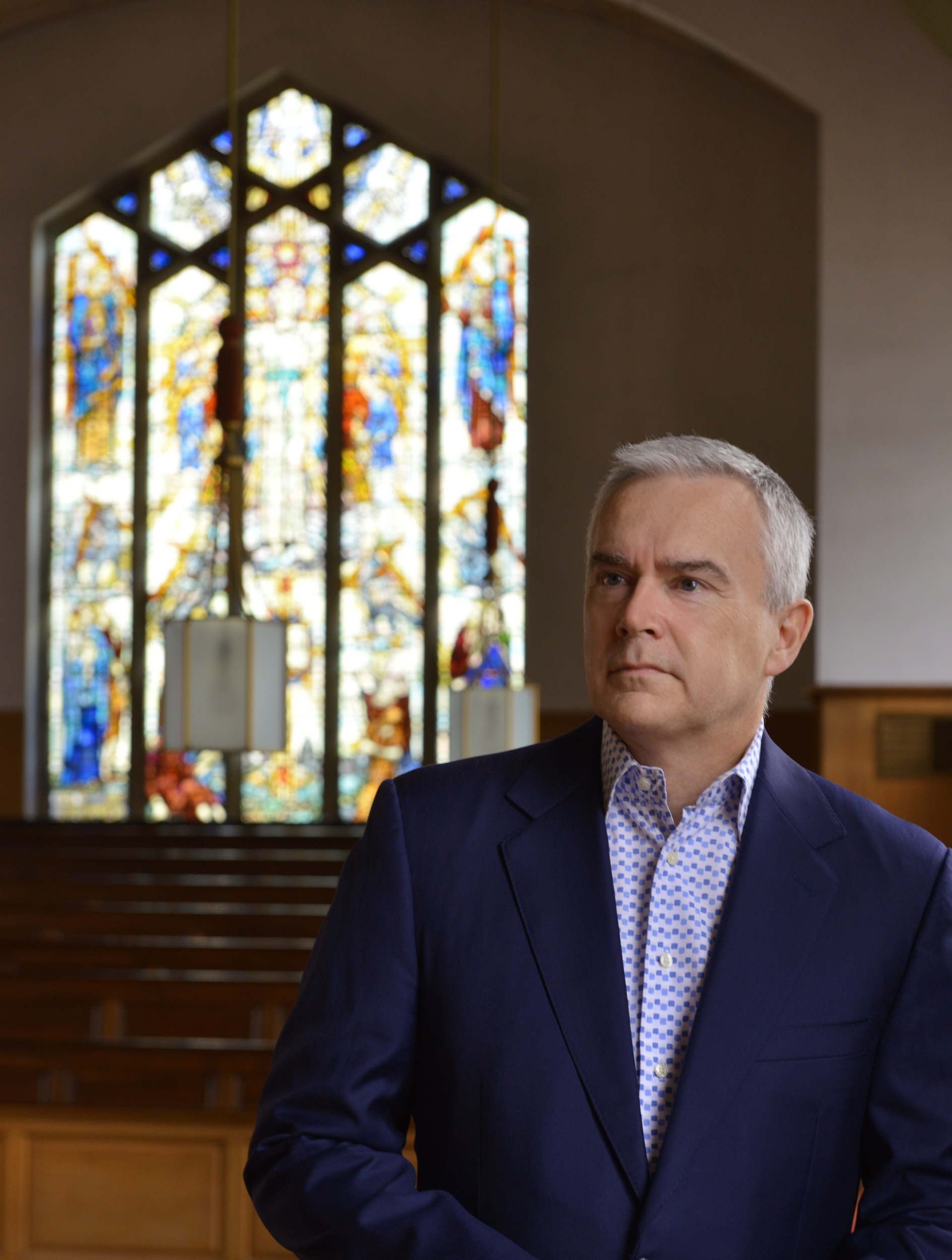
Edwards in the church, 2014
