= Mark Kermode's Secrets of Cinema =

- Genre: Documentary
- Written by: Kim Newman; Mark Kermode
- Directed by: Nick Freand Jones
- Presented by: Mark Kermode
- Theme music composer: Neil Brand
- Country of origin: United Kingdom
- Original language: English
- No. of series: 4 (inc. specials)
- No. of episodes: 14

Production
- Executive producers: Richard Bright; John Das
- Producer: Nick Freand Jones
- Editors: Jude Suggett; Beth Hourston; Steve Miller
- Running time: 60
- Production company: BBC Studios

Original release
- Network: BBC Four
- Release: 17 July 2018 – 25 January 2021

Mark Kermode's Secrets of Cinema is a British TV documentary series on BBC Four. Presented by the film critic Mark Kermode, each 60-minute episode examines the tropes which come together to make a particular genre of cinema. An initial series of five episodes aired in 2018. A Christmas special was broadcast later that year, followed by two further specials in 2019. Series two and three, each consisting of three episodes, aired in 2020 and 2021 respectively. The programme has attracted positive reviews from TV critics.

== Format ==
In each episode, Kermode takes a different genre of cinema and examines the elements that go up to make the perfect example of what a film in that genre would be like. Animated captions list each trope, with Kermode then explaining each one using examples from various movies.

== Episodes ==
=== Series overview ===
Series	Episodes	Originally released	
Series	Episodes	First released	Last released
1	5	17 July 2018	14 August 2018
Specials	3	20 December 2018	22 April 2019
2	3	19 March 2020	2 April 2020
3	3	11 January 2021	25 January 2021

=== Series 1 (2018) ===
No. overall	No. in season	Title	Original release date
1	1	"The Romcom"	17 July 2018
2	2	"The Heist"	24 July 2018
3	3	"Coming of Age"	31 July 2018
4	4	"Science fiction"	7 August 2018
5	5	"Horror"	14 August 2018

=== Specials (2018–19) ===
No. overall	No. in season	Title	Original release date
6	1	"Mark Kermode's Christmas Cinema Secrets"	20 December 2018
7	2	"Mark Kermode's Oscar Winners: A Secrets of Cinema Special"	21 February 2019
8	3	"Disaster Movies"	22 April 2019

=== Series 2 (2020) ===
In October 2019, the BBC announced that three more episodes of the series would be broadcast, covering superheroes, British history movies, and spies.

No. overall	No. in season	Title	Original release date
9	1	"Superheroes"	19 March 2020
10	2	"British History Movies"	26 March 2020
11	3	"Spies"	2 April 2020

=== Series 3 (2021) ===
In December 2020, the BBC announced that another three episodes of the series would be broadcast, covering British comedy, pop music movies, and cult movies.

No. overall	No. in season	Title	Original release date
12	1	"British Comedy"	11 January 2021
13	2	"Pop Music Movies"	18 January 2021
14	3	"Cult Movies"	25 January 2021

== Production ==
In an interview with Den of Geek, the chief writer of the series Kim Newman said that the reason for the creation of Secrets of Cinema was that: "there hasn't been a show like this before. Even in the deep history of TV discussions of cinema, they've always been about a director, a movie star, sometimes even a studio. One thing we've bent over backwards on is not to use the word genre in the title, or the publicity for the show. But that's what this is about!"

== Releases ==
The entire first series of Secrets of Cinema was made free to watch on the BBC iPlayer from 12 December 2018 for several months. All previous series typically appear on iPlayer when repeated or a new series begins airing.

== Reception ==
Secrets of Cinema received positive reviews from TV critics. Sean O'Grady wrote in The Independent concerning "The Heist" episode: "It was a compelling watch because gradually every crime "caper" you've ever seen suddenly slotted into his minimalist structure, albeit one that sometimes gets twisted." In The Observer, a newspaper Kermode also writes for, Euan Ferguson wrote in his review that, "I try to make it a rule never to be too nice to colleagues, let alone quote two in one piece, but I have to say Mark Kermode's Secrets of Cinema was an endlessly refreshing delight. [...] This was a splendid hour, could have run for three: you not only get Mark's insights, often lancet-sharp, you get to see a lot of snatches of films."

In The Herald, Alison Rowat wrote humorously in her review: "Who does Mark Kermode think he is? Coming into our living rooms with his Mark Kermode's Secrets of Cinema, a five-part series that could have gone to some poor, starving, blonde, Glaswegian TV critic who takes in film reviewing and washing on the side? How dare he, with chief writer Kim Newman, take film fans on a lucid, funny, fascinating, trip through the various genres, using perfectly chosen clips to show how each works?"

Writing in the Irish Independent, a reviewer commented that the experience of viewing the episode on "Disaster Movies" was "like sitting through a lecture from the world's coolest professor", whilst at the same time drawing attention to the role of Kim Newman as "the series' unseen and usually unsung hero".
