= BBC News at Ten =

Flagship BBC evening news programme

- Title card used since 3 April 2023. In 2024, the Royal Television Society award for "Network Daily News Programme of the Year" tag was removed.
- Also known as: BBC Ten O'Clock News
- Created by: BBC News
- Presented by: Fiona Bruce; Sophie Raworth; Reeta Chakrabarti; Clive Myrie; Jane Hill
- Theme music composer: David Lowe
- Country of origin: United Kingdom
- Original language: English

Production
- Production locations: BBC Television Centre (2000–2013); Broadcasting House, London (2013–present)
- Camera setup: Multi-camera
- Running time: 35 minutes (Weekdays); 20 minutes (Sundays, listed on TV guide as BBC Weekend News)
- Production company: BBC News

Original release
- Network: BBC One; BBC News (UK feed)
- Release: 16 October 2000 – present

Related
- BBC Breakfast; BBC News at One; BBC News at Six; BBC Weekend News

BBC News at Ten (formerly known as the BBC Ten O'Clock News or the Ten O'Clock News) is the BBC's flagship evening/nightly news programme on British television channels BBC One and BBC News, broadcast nightly at 10:00 pm and produced by BBC News. It is normally broadcast for 30 minutes, except on bank holidays when it may be shorter and only shown on BBC One. The programme was controversially moved from 9:00 pm to 10:00 pm on 16 October 2000. The Sunday edition of the programme is listed as BBC Weekend News on TV guide and BBC iPlayer.

Since the suspension of Huw Edwards in July 2023, leading to his resignation from the BBC several months later, the programme has been without a fixed presenter schedule, and has been fronted by Fiona Bruce, Sophie Raworth, Reeta Chakrabarti, Clive Myrie and Jane Hill.

From 4 February 2015 to 27 December 2019, the programme had a 45-minute format, with a half-hour segment focusing on British national and international news (with an emphasis on the latter), a 12-minute segment of local news from the BBC's Nations and regions across the UK, and concluding with the national weather forecast. The programme used a shortened, 35-minute format on Friday nights to accommodate The Graham Norton Show. On 4 February 2019, in order to accommodate a new time slot focusing on youth programmes from BBC Three, the shortened format was adopted on a nightly basis. The programme was re-extended during the 2019 general election and during part of the COVID-19 pandemic it was extended back to its 45-minute format, with Newsnight moving to 10:45pm on BBC Two. Since mid-2021, the programme reverted to its 35-minute format.

During the first three months of its revival, ITV News at Ten averaged 2.2 million viewers compared with an average of 4.8 million viewers watching the BBC bulletin over the same period.

BBC News at Ten is usually not broadcast on the international feed of BBC News channel and is meant for UK viewers only. However, during special occasions or major stories such as the death of Queen Elizabeth II, the programme is simulcast on the international feed, carrying BBC News at Ten branding and title sequence, although listed on the guide as simply BBC News.

== History ==
The programme was launched on 16 October 2000, replacing the BBC Nine O'Clock News which had been on the air since 14 September 1970. Its launch presenters were Michael Buerk and Peter Sissons with George Alagiah as relief newscaster when neither Buerk or Sissons were available. The move to 10:00 pm was a response to the controversial axing of rival broadcaster ITV's News at Ten. ITV reinstated a 20-minute news bulletin at 10:00 pm on 22 January 2001, instigating a head-to-head clash with the BBC. The BBC's Ten O'Clock News eventually became the more popular programme, establishing itself on the BBC One schedule for at least six days a week. ITV's bulletin suffered as a result of poor scheduling, and on 2 February 2004 the bulletin moved to 10:30pm. In 2008, ITV reinstated News at Ten which remains the BBC's main competitor.

Michael Buerk presenting on 18 October 2000

Buerk and Sissons left the BBC Ten O'Clock News on 19 January 2003 to make way for presenters Huw Edwards and Fiona Bruce. To mark this presenter reshuffle, on Monday 20 January 2003 as Edwards and Bruce took over, the bulletin and the rest of BBC One news bulletins were relaunched with a new studio. Since 5 February 2006, the bulletin has been simulcast on the BBC News channel.

On 21 April 2008, the programme, along with the rest of BBC News, underwent a graphical refresh and moved into a refurbished studio (N6). It also changed its name to BBC News at Ten.

A national weather forecast is included within the programme, just before the hand-over to the news from the Nations and Regions.

BBC News at Ten was named News Programme of the Year at the RTS Television Journalism Awards in 2005, 2009 and 2010.

The programme, along with the BBC News and the others BBC One bulletins, moved to Broadcasting House and began broadcasting in high-definition on 18 March 2013.

Following a five-month trial during the run-up to the 2015 general election, it was announced that the programme would be permanently extended to 45 minutes on Mondays through Thursdays from January 2016 (with the Friday-night edition retaining its original length to accommodate The Graham Norton Show).

Following 16 years in the role, on 4 January 2019, Bruce stepped down as the programme's main presenter on Fridays in order to replace David Dimbleby on Question Time. Sophie Raworth and Clive Myrie serve as the regular presenters on Fridays with Bruce occasionally appearing on the programme as a relief presenter.

On 4 February 2019, it was announced that the programme would be shortened back to 35 minutes beginning 4 March 2019, to accommodate a new broadcast of BBC Three programmes on Monday, Tuesday, and Wednesday nights. The decision faced criticism from those who believed this was the result of cuts. BBC staff denied that this was the case, arguing that the time slot could help attract BBC Three's target audience, and would also remove the scheduling overlap with Newsnight on BBC Two.

On 16 March 2020, in light of the COVID-19 pandemic, the programme was extended to a 45-minute bulletin until 13 March 2022; until May 2021 Newsnight moved to 10:45 pm, initially because it shared a studio with the BBC News at Ten, and later to avoid a schedule clash. The 10 o'clock news bulletin lasted 30 minutes, with news bulletins from the BBC's regional services lasting for 15 minutes. On 19 July 2021, the bulletin went back to 35 minutes, with Newsnight returning to its normal time of 10:30 pm.

On 26 May 2022, the BBC announced that the BBC News at Six and Ten, along with BBC Breakfast will be revamped in June 2022 to include a completely new studio and presentation, as part of a wider rebrand of the BBC in general. Local regional programmes will also be revamped over the coming months to tie in with the regional BBC channels broadcasting in HD by the beginning of June 2023.

On 13 June 2022, the BBC News at 10 broadcast their first edition from the new studio set, which is a much larger studio than before with different sized screens which can be interacted with by reporters and the presenter. A new semi-circle desk has also been introduced, as well as a spiral staircase in a nod to the previous studio which showed the spiral staircase in the newsroom. The BBC News at 6 broadcast their first edition from the new studio a day later. Since then, the BBC Weather forecasts follow both the 6 and 10 O'clock national bulletins, which is also followed by introductions to regional news programmes from England and national news programmes from Scotland, Wales and Northern Ireland.

Following the unification of BBC News for UK viewers and international viewers in April 2023, the programme continues to be simulcast only on the UK feed while international viewers get BBC World News America at the same time slot instead. The presentation after the merge remains identical except for the new titles with chameleon-style branding.

== Out-of-studio presenting ==
As well as presenting from the main studio, the main presenters are called upon to present on location when major stories break. For example, Huw Edwards reported live from Washington, D.C. for the 2008, 2012 and 2016 US presidential elections and presented live from Basra at the withdrawal ceremony. He also regularly presented from Westminster, as well as from Edinburgh (at times when the referendum for Scottish independence was being developed).

During the 2012 Summer Olympics, presenters also made use of BBC's makeshift studios overlooking the Olympic Park at Stratford. George Alagiah presented from L'Aquila in April 2009, Haiti in 2010, Egypt in 2011 and Tacloban in 2013.

On 14 June 2017, the evening of the Grenfell Tower fire, Huw Edwards presented live from a distance outside of the tower block. The still-burning tower could be seen behind Edwards as he was covering the story.

On 10 October 2018, due to technical problems at the Broadcasting House, Huw Edwards presented at BBC Millbank Studios.

In March 2022, Reeta Chakrabarti presented from Lviv (as well as the bulletins at One and Six) during the Russian invasion of Ukraine.

Between February and March 2026, Clive Myrie presented the show live from Tel Aviv during the Iran war, as well as the bulletins at One and Six.

== Staff ==
=== Editor ===
Paul Royall has been the editor of BBC News at Ten and BBC News at Six since 1 July 2013. Royall joined the BBC from ITV Meridian in 1997, working on News 24. He later became deputy editor of BBC Breakfast in January 2004, to the editor Mark Grannell. In May 2009, he became the deputy editor of the News at Ten and News at Six. He became editor on 22 July 2013, replacing James Stephenson who became Head of BBC World News.

== Presenters ==
=== Current presenters ===
Years	Presenter	Current Role
2003–present	Fiona Bruce	Regular presenter
2003–present	Sophie Raworth	Regular presenter
2014–present	Reeta Chakrabarti	Regular presenter
2014–present	Clive Myrie	Regular presenter
2014–present	Jane Hill	Regular presenter
2018–present	Ben Brown	Relief presenter
2019–present	Tina Daheley	Relief presenter
2025–present	Christian Fraser	Relief presenter

=== Former presenters ===
Years	Presenter	Role
2000–2004	Michael Buerk	Main presenter (2000–2003) Relief presenter (2003–2004)
2000–2004	Peter Sissons	Main presenter (2000–2003) Relief presenter (2003–2004)
2003–2023	Huw Edwards	Main presenter
2000–2014	George Alagiah	Relief presenter
2004–2006	Darren Jordon	Relief presenter
2005–2007	Dermot Murnaghan	Relief presenter
2006–2007	Natasha Kaplinsky	Relief presenter
2007	Jon Sopel	Relief presenter
2007–2013	Emily Maitlis	Relief presenter
2008–2013	Sian Williams	Relief presenter
2009–2013	Kate Silverton	Relief presenter
2010–2024	Mishal Husain	Relief presenter
2019	Simon McCoy	Relief presenter

== See also ==
- BBC News
- BBC Weekend News
- ITV News at Ten
