= Huw Edwards =

Welsh news presenter (born 1961)

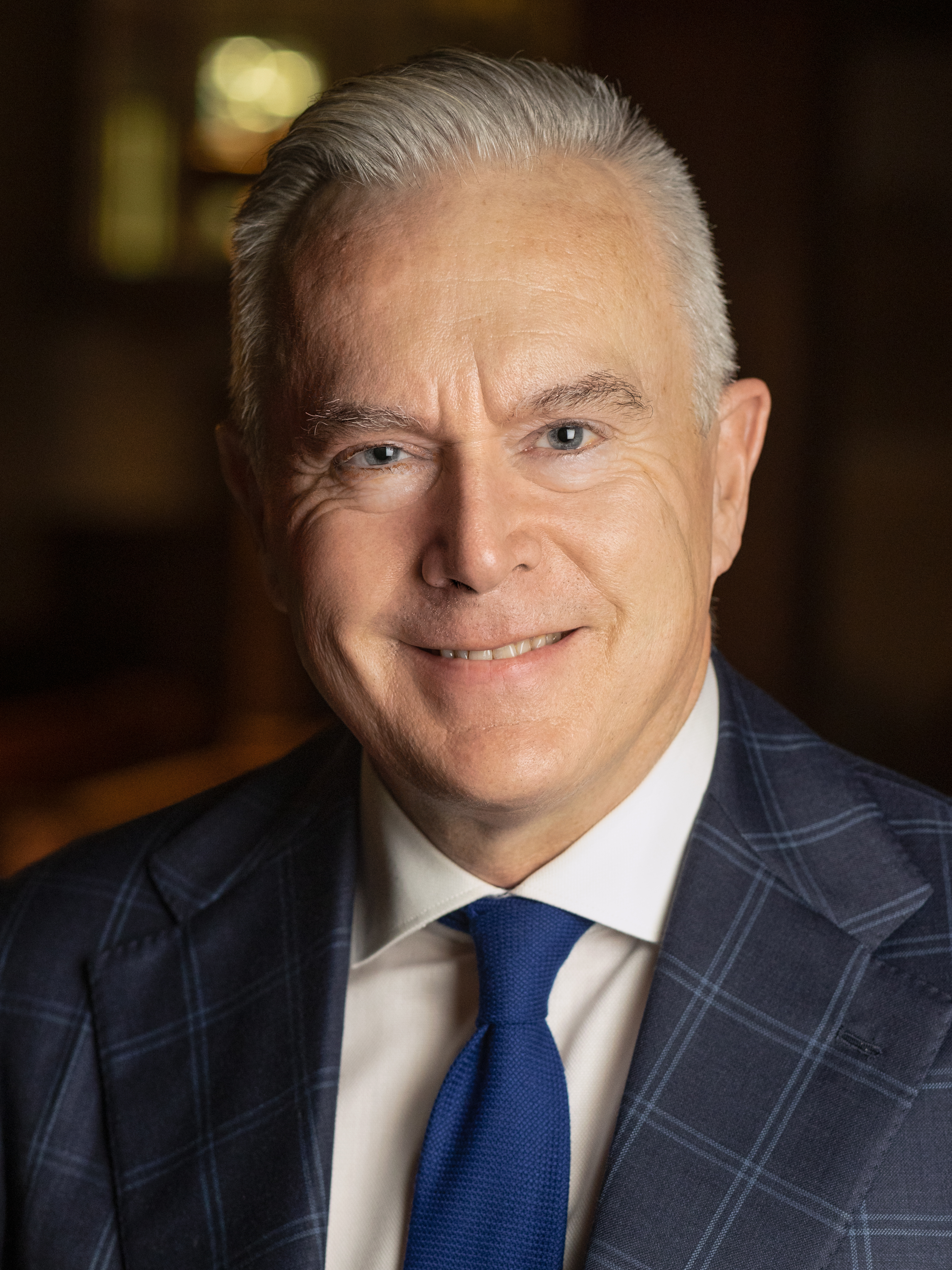
- Edwards in 2021
- Born: 18 August 1961 (age 65); Bridgend, Glamorgan, Wales
- Education: Cardiff University (BA); University of Wales Trinity Saint David (PhD)
- Occupation: News presenter
- Employer: BBC (1984–2024)
- Criminal charge: Making indecent images of children
- Criminal penalty: 6 months in prison, suspended for 2 years; 7 years on sex offenders' register
- Spouse: Vicky Flind (m. 1993, separated)
- Children: 5
- Father: Hywel Teifi Edwards

Huw Edwards (/hɪʊ, hjuː/ hiw, hew, Welsh pronunciation: [hɨu]; born 18 August 1961) is a Welsh former news presenter. He was the lead presenter of BBC News at Ten, the late evening news programme of BBC Television, from 2003 to 2023, as well as a chief presenter for BBC News. He resigned from the BBC in 2024, during a police investigation into indecent images of children offences to which he pleaded guilty.

At the BBC, Edwards anchored coverage of state and international events, and occasionally presented on BBC News at Six, BBC News at One, BBC Weekend News, Daily Politics and the international news channel BBC World News. He presented coverage of major royal events, including the announcement and coverage of the death and state funeral of Elizabeth II and the coronation of Charles III and Camilla. He also presented BBC News at Five, which was broadcast on BBC News from 2006 until 2020. He was the lead presenter for the 2019 general election coverage.

In July 2023, Edwards was suspended by the BBC following allegations of sexual misconduct made in The Sun. The South Wales Police and the Metropolitan Police found no evidence of criminal conduct. Edwards was hospitalised with depression shortly afterwards, and resigned in April 2024. In July, he pleaded guilty to three counts of making indecent images of children by receiving them during online chats. On 16 September, he was given a six-month suspended jail sentence and was added to the sex offenders' register.

== Early life and education ==
Huw Edwards was born on 18 August 1961 in Bridgend, Glamorgan, Wales, into a Welsh-speaking family, and, from the age of four, was brought up in Llangennech, near Llanelli. His father, Hywel Teifi Edwards, was a Plaid Cymru and Welsh language activist, and an author and academic, who was research professor of Welsh-language Literature at University College of Swansea. Edwards' mother, Aerona Protheroe, spent 30 years teaching at Llanelli's Ysgol Gyfun y Strade. He has one sister, Meinir.

Edwards was educated at Llanelli Boys' Grammar School. In 1978, he applied to Hertford College, Oxford, but was rejected. He graduated with a first-class honours degree in French from University College, Cardiff, in 1983. After his first degree, he started postgraduate work at Cardiff University in Medieval French, before becoming a reporter for local radio station Swansea Sound and then joining the BBC.

In 2018, Edwards was awarded a Doctor of Philosophy (PhD) degree, with a thesis on Welsh Nonconformist chapels in Llanelli and London, by the University of Wales Trinity Saint David. His doctoral thesis was titled O Dinopolis i Fetropolis: arolwg o lanw a thrai achosion Ymneilltuol Cymraeg yn Llanelli a Llundain, 1714–2014 ("From Tinopolis to Metropolis: A Survey of the Ebb and Flow of Welsh Dissenting Causes in Llanelli and London, 1714–2014"). He said, "It's 12 years since I was here to receive an honorary fellowship which was a great day but today is an even bigger day because I am receiving my PhD after 7 agonising years of hard work on the history of the Welsh chapels in the 18th century."

== Career ==
=== BBC News ===
Edwards spent a short time on work experience at the independent commercial radio station Swansea Sound, presenting a programme on opera and working as a newsreader. He joined the BBC as a news trainee in 1984. Edwards also made regular appearances on the Welsh-language television channel S4C, working as the sub-editor and presenter of the programme Newyddion Saith from June 1985. In November 1986, he became parliamentary correspondent for BBC Cymru Wales, before being promoted to senior political correspondent at BBC News in 1988. From 1994 to 1998, Edwards was the chairman of the S4C current affairs programme Pawb a’i Farn (Everyone to his Opinion). He fronted the BBC's coverage of the 1997 Welsh devolution referendum, and coverage of the 1999 local elections in England and Wales.

Between 1994 and January 2003, Edwards presented the BBC Six O'Clock News, then the most watched news programme in Britain. In January 2003, Edwards became the main presenter of the Ten O'Clock News on BBC One, the BBC's flagship news broadcast. He also presented various special programmes such as the Festival of Remembrance. He led the BBC commentary team at the opening and closing ceremonies of the 2008 Beijing Olympics, 2012 London Olympics and 2014 Commonwealth Games. He presented several election specials, including coverage of the 2007 National Assembly for Wales election for BBC Wales and the BBC coverage of the results of the 2008 United States elections and the inauguration of Barack Obama. He was formerly chief political correspondent for BBC News, and spent more than 14 years reporting politics from Westminster across a range of BBC programmes.

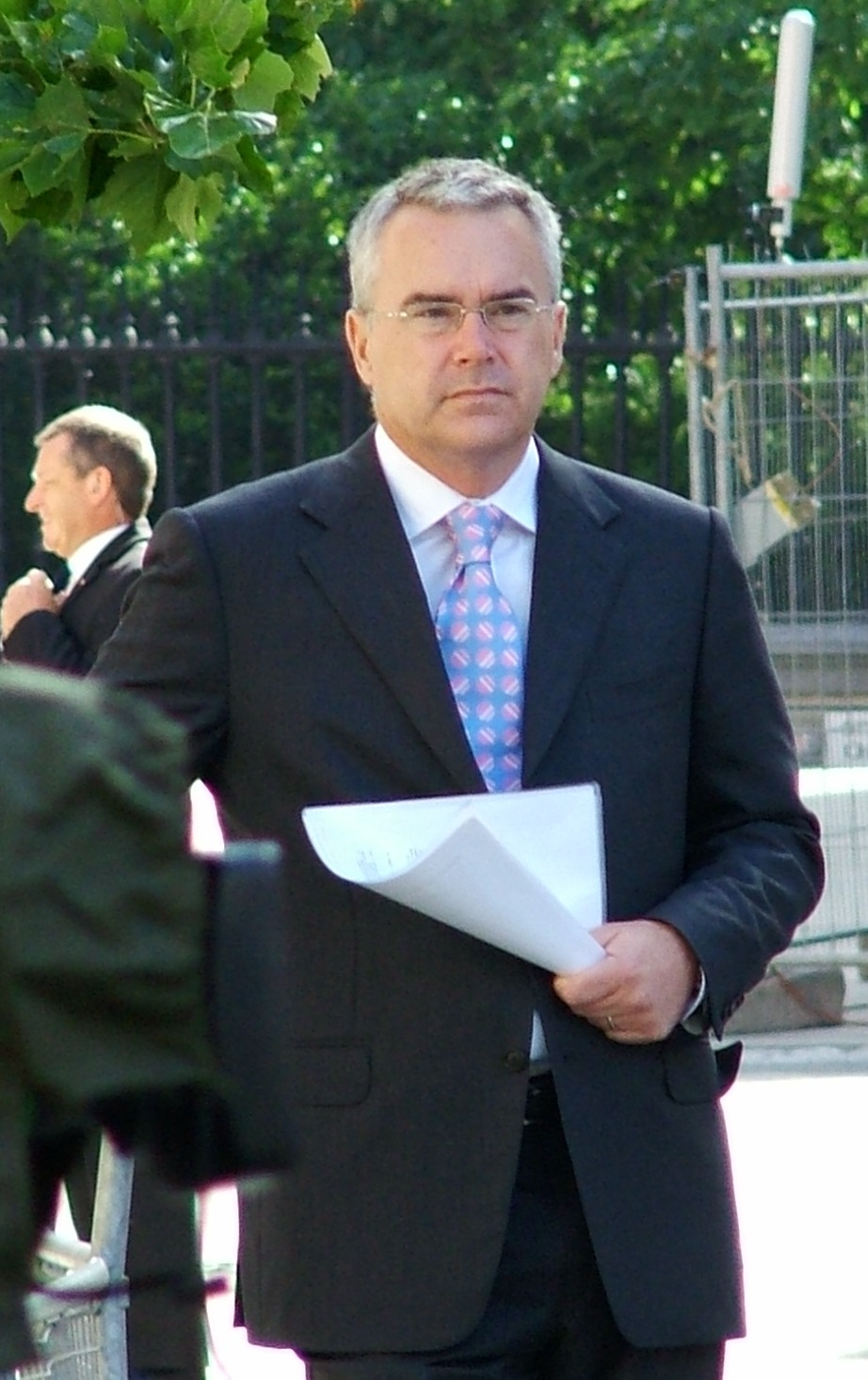
Edwards in 2006

Edwards presented or contributed to a range of other BBC News programmes, including Breakfast News, One O'Clock News, Newsnight and Panorama. From April 2006 until 2020, he presented the BBC News at Five on the 24-hour BBC News channel. On 29 April 2011, he presented the BBC coverage of the wedding of Prince William and Catherine Middleton. At its peak, the coverage was watched by 20 million viewers in the UK and the team won a BAFTA Award for Best Coverage of a Live Event. In June 2012, Edwards presented the BBC coverage of the Diamond Jubilee of Elizabeth II. In May 2013, Edwards took over BBC coverage of local elections from David Dimbleby. He presented a special news report for the BBC following the death of Nelson Mandela in December 2013.

Edwards shared the BBC's 2015 general election coverage with Dimbleby, and contributed to the coverage of the 2016 United Kingdom European Union membership referendum. In May 2018, he shared the presentation of the BBC coverage of the wedding of Prince Harry and Meghan Markle. In 2019, he succeeded Dimbleby as the host of BBC election night coverage. and was the lead presenter for the 2019 general election coverage. In April 2021, he presented the rolling coverage across BBC One, BBC Two, BBC News Channel and BBC World News following the death and funeral of Prince Philip.

External videos
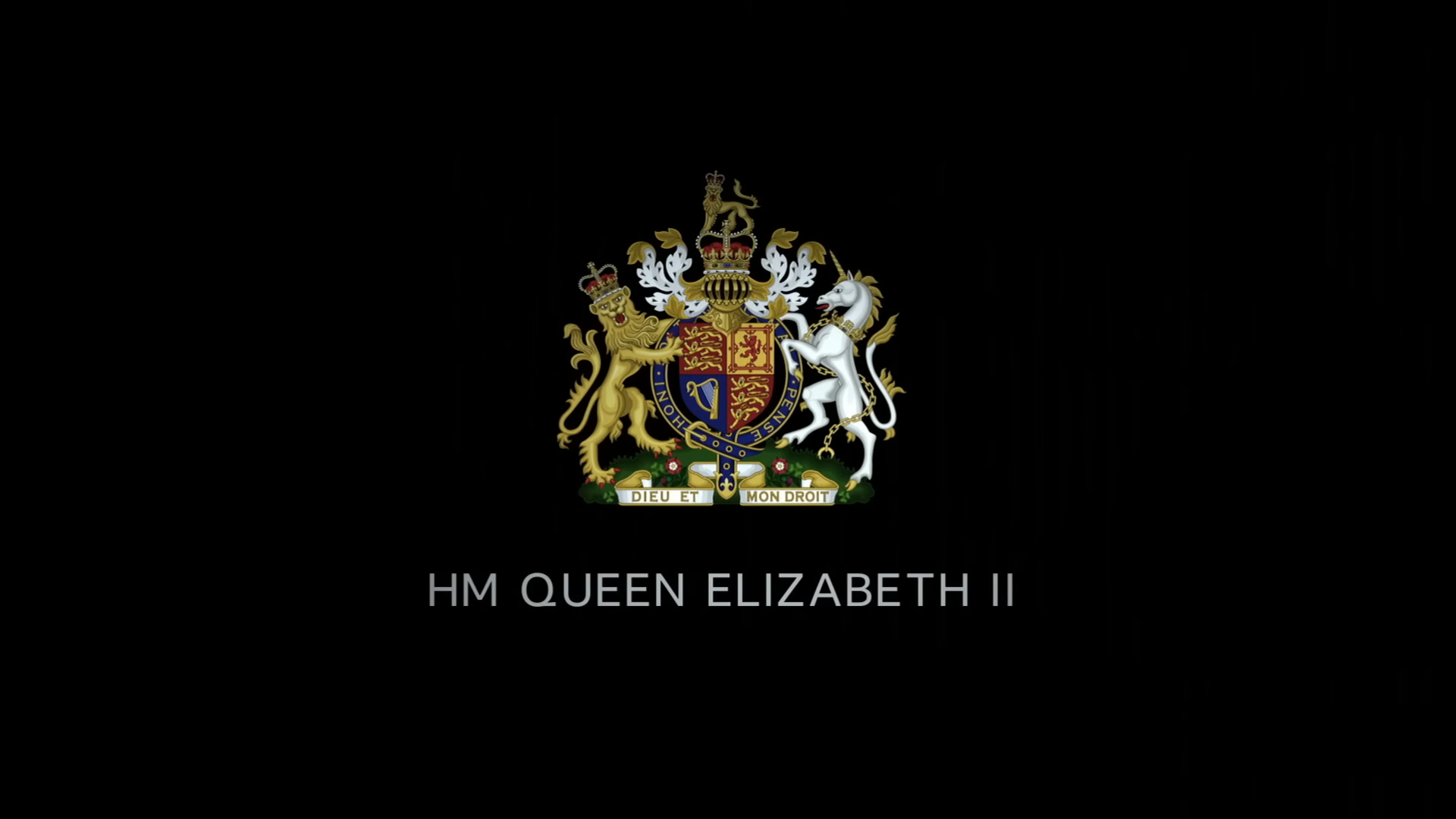
- Announcement of the death of the Queen on the BBC's television channels read by Edwards.

In August 2021, Edwards told BBC Radio Cymru he was contemplating his future, saying 20 years of news "can be taxing" and that viewers should "get a change". In January 2022, he joined BBC Radio Cymru as one of five regular presenters for the Sunday morning current affairs programme Bore Sul. On 8 September 2022, Edwards announced the death of Queen Elizabeth II, during rolling news coverage that had begun around 14:00 BST following an announcement from Buckingham Palace earlier in the day. He presented the BBC's coverage of her state funeral on 19 September.

=== Other BBC programmes and appearances ===
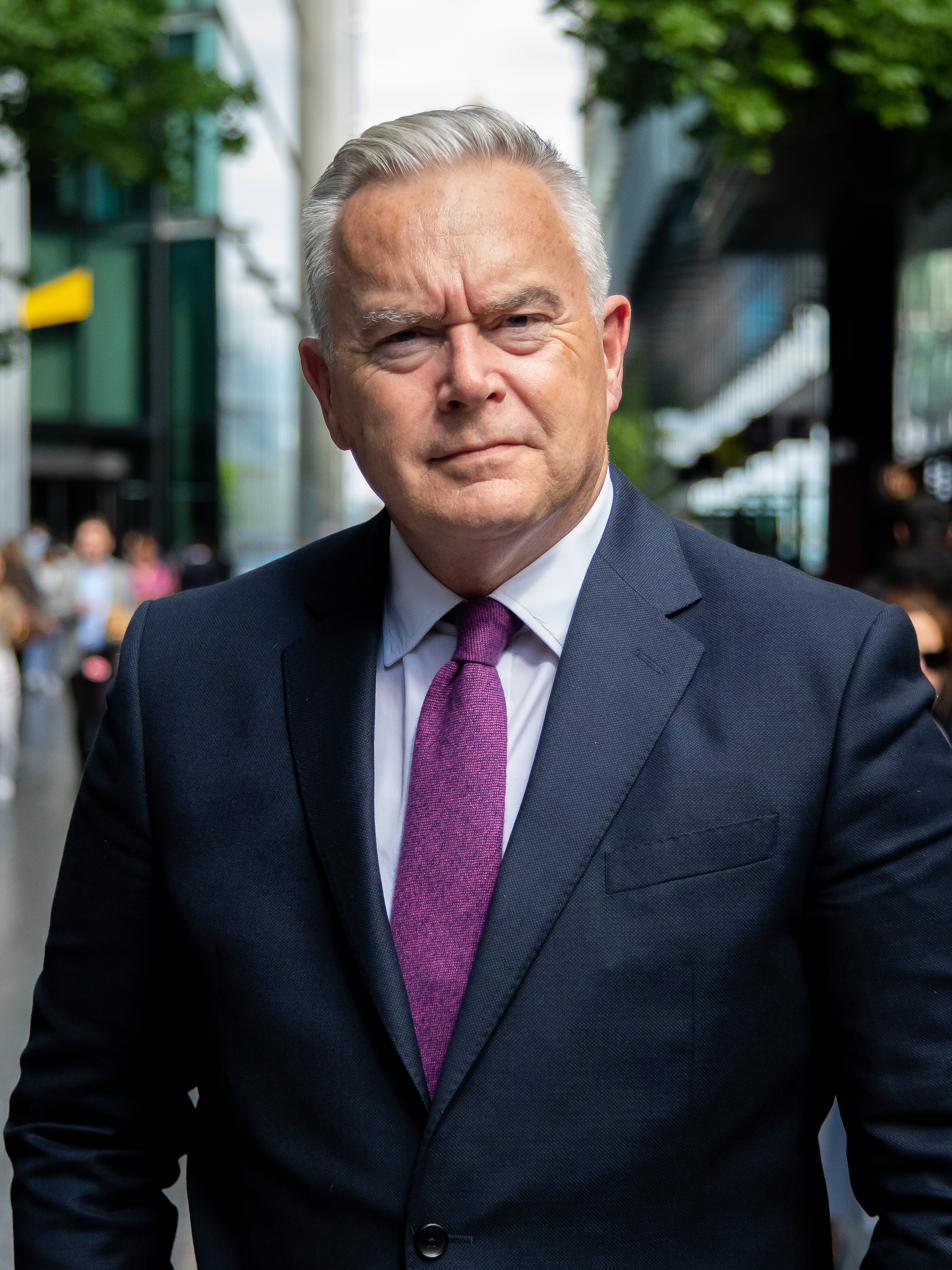
Edwards in 2023

Beyond news, Edwards presented a range of programmes on television and radio, including documentaries on classical music, religion and the Welsh language (of which he is a native speaker), and hosted various events such as the BAFTA Cymru award ceremonies. He has presented historical documentaries including Owain Glyndŵr, the South Wales Valleys, Gladstone and Disraeli and a series following the work of the Royal Commission on the Ancient and Historical Monuments of Wales. He presented Bread of Heaven with Huw Edwards, a documentary about the impact of religion in Wales, which won the 2005 BAFTA Cymru for best documentary and nominations in four other categories. In 2006, Edwards made a voice appearance in the Doctor Who episode "Fear Her".

In September 2008, the BBC Trust ruled that a documentary on Welsh politics presented by Edwards, Wales: Power and the People – Back to the Future, had broken the BBC's editorial guidelines. The documentary covered the Welsh Assembly, with Edwards stating: "To achieve its full potential it needs even greater support for the people of Wales than it's received so far ... The more people that take part, the stronger and healthier our democracy in Wales will be." Following a complaint, the governing body concluded that Edwards' words were not objective and even-handed, saying: "It is not the role of BBC presenters to encourage audiences to exercise their right to vote on particular occasions." It was also found that the documentary as a whole was biased against the Conservative Party.

In 2010, Edwards presented The Prince and the Plotter about the investiture of the Prince of Wales and the part played by Mudiad Amddiffyn Cymru ("Defence of Wales Movement"). He received the Best On-Screen Presenter award at the BAFTA Cymru Awards. In February 2012, Edwards launched a historical documentary series made by BBC Wales, The Story of Wales. That year, Edwards appeared as himself in the James Bond film Skyfall, presenting a BBC News report on a fictional attack on the British intelligence service MI6.

In 2015, Edwards presented a history of the Welsh colony in Patagonia—in English and Welsh versions—to celebrate the 150th anniversary of the colony's establishment. In December 2018, he was a guest of Mary Berry in BBC One's Mary Berry's Christmas Party. In December 2022, he was the narrator for the BBC Four programme Organ Stops: Saving the King of Instruments.

=== BBC salary ===
Edwards earned £550,000–£599,999 per annum as a BBC presenter for several years. His salary was reduced voluntarily in the light of gender pay differences found within the BBC. Press Gazette announced his new salary as £520,000–£529,999 as of July 2018. His salary was reduced to £465,000 as of May 2019, and reduced further to £435,000–£439,999 in July 2023. It was raised by £40,000 between April 2023 and April 2024, when he resigned from the BBC "on medical advice". By then, he had been suspended for nine months over allegations in The Sun newspaper that he had been paying a young person for sexually explicit photos.

=== Other activities ===
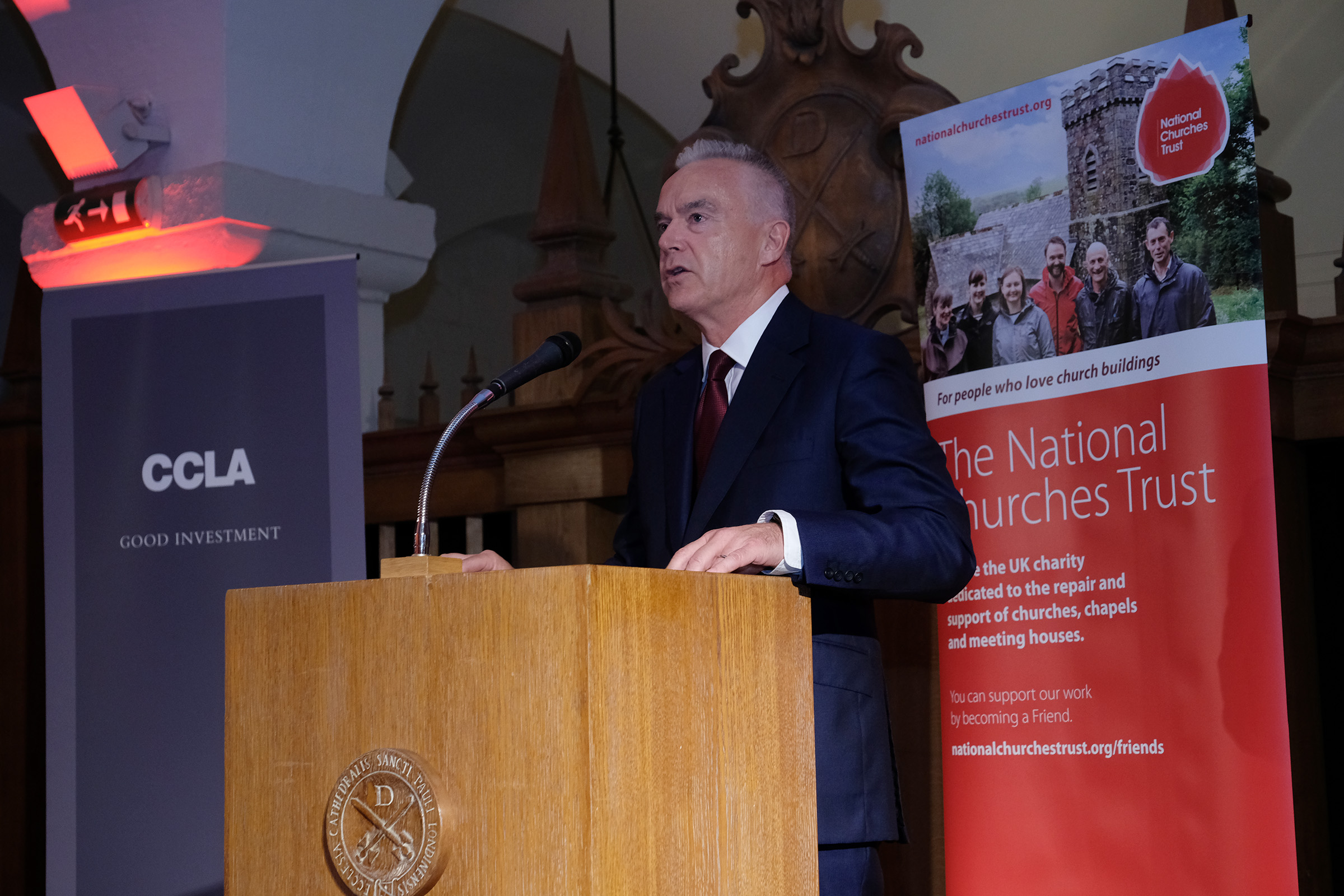
Edwards was a vice president of the National Churches Trust.

In March 2011, Edwards opened Swansea University's "Hoffi Coffi" cafe in the library, created to support the aims of Academi Hywel Teifi, named after his father who spent his academic career at the university. He gave a speech in Welsh as he unveiled a mural of a poem by Tudur Hallam, Professor of Welsh at the university and winner of the Chair in the previous year's National Eisteddfod; Edwards called it a moving tribute to his father, who had died in January 2010.

In 2003, Edwards was made a Fellow of the University of Wales and in 2007 he became Honorary Professor of Journalism at Cardiff University. In 2005, he was appointed Patron of the National College of Music and in October 2008 he was appointed President of the London Welsh Trust which runs the London Welsh Centre. In April 2009 he was elected vice president, later Pro Chancellor, of Cardiff University for four years. He was honorary President of London's Gwalia Male Choir from 2005 to 2016, and was a vice president of the National Churches Trust until his removal from the position in 2024 after his sexual misconduct charges.

On 5 July 2019, Edwards was awarded a fellowship of the Royal Welsh College of Music & Drama. Edwards is also an amateur organist, taught to play at a chapel in Llanelli, and occasionally played at the Jewin Welsh Presbyterian Chapel in Clerkenwell, north London.

In 2020, Edwards criticised The Times for printing a story dismissive of the use of the Welsh language. He responded to comments in The Times written by the scientist Michael Pepper in which it was suggested that his late colleague John Meurig Thomas wrote notes in Welsh purely to stop others from reading them; Edwards said that Welsh speakers do not "use our native language in our daily lives simply to thwart others". In 2021, he criticised the former journalist Max Hastings for saying that Welsh was of "marginal value" and that Wales could not succeed as an independent country because it was "dependent on English largesse".

In 2026, Edwards revealed via his Substack that he entered the National Eisteddfod's Crown poetry competition. The competition is entered anonymously, with only the winners identity being revealed. He entered under the pen name Gelyn, meaning 'Enemy' and said he entered the poem as a tribute to his father. Due to his conviction, his entry was met with criticism.

== Personal life ==
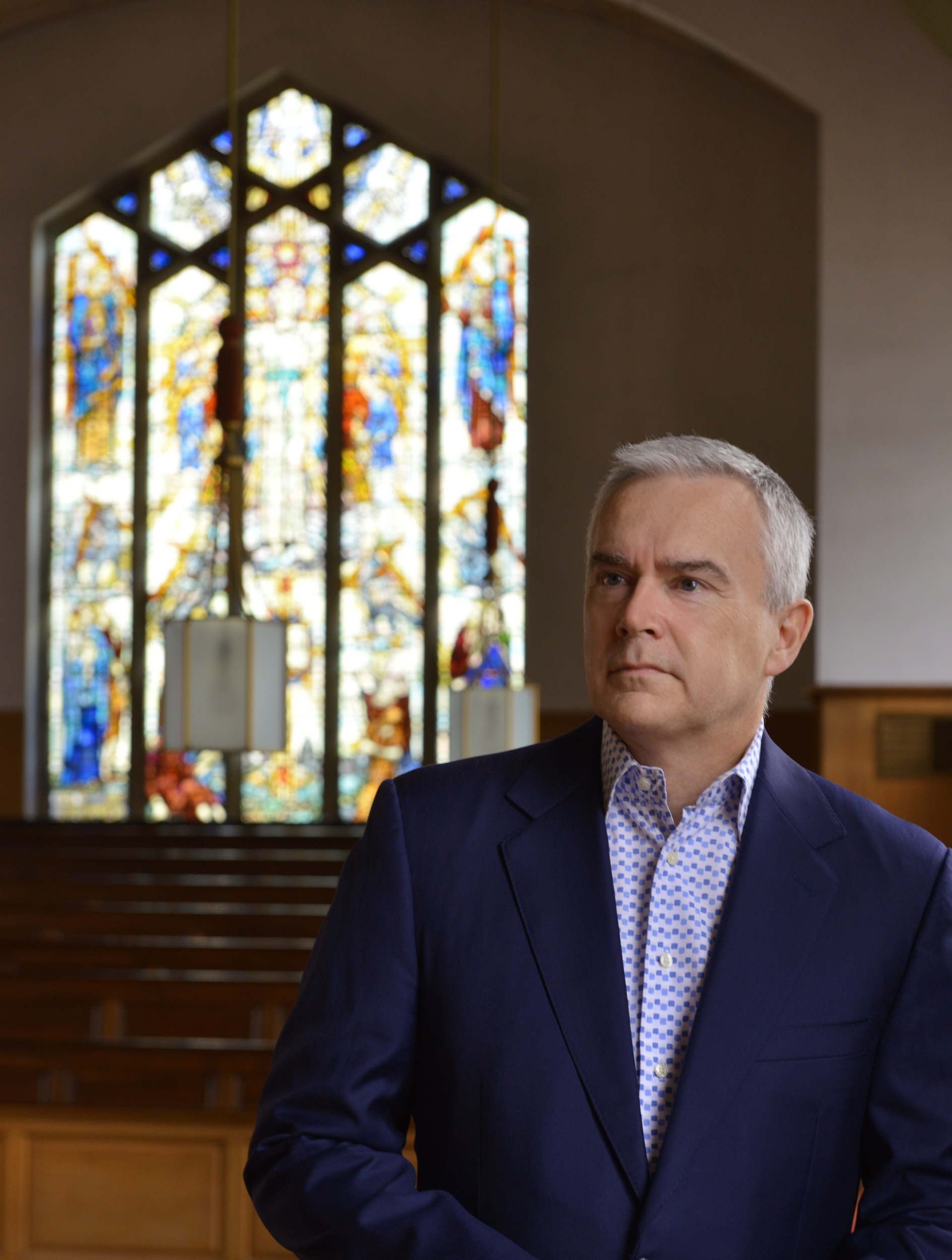
Edwards at a church in 2014

In 1993, Edwards married Vicky Flind, a television producer, whose credits include editing This Week and Peston. They lived in Dulwich, London, and have five children. In July 2024 it was reported that Edwards and Flind had separated some time ago and that Edwards had been living elsewhere. Flind reportedly filed for divorce after Edwards' sentencing.

Edwards is a Christian who, as of 2013, attended Presbyterian Church of Wales services in Welsh. He led a campaign to save the historic Jewin Presbyterian Church, London's oldest Welsh chapel.

He has said he has had bouts of clinical depression since 2002.

== Sexual misconduct allegations and conviction ==
=== Allegations in The Sun ===
On 6 July 2023, Edwards was informed by a BBC manager that The Sun had shared allegations concerning him, and it was agreed that he would not appear on air while the BBC investigated. The following day, The Sun published details of a well-known BBC presenter paying a young person more than £35,000 from when he was 17 years old in return for "sordid images", but did not name Edwards. The story was based on allegations by the mother and stepfather of the teenager. A lawyer representing the young person said nothing inappropriate or illegal had taken place, and that the teenager and mother were estranged. On 12 July, Edwards' wife named him as the subject and said that he was receiving hospital treatment for depression. He had not appeared on the BBC since presenting the 5 July edition of BBC News at One.

Shortly before Edwards was named, the Metropolitan Police reported that it had found no evidence of crime and would not investigate further. The Sun stated that it had never alleged crime on the part of Edwards, which The Guardian described as backtracking. The Sun also said it would cooperate with the BBC's internal investigation and would not publish further allegations. Edwards was provided the results of the BBC's inquiry in or before November 2023 and was not reinstated. In January 2024, he was reported as too unwell to discuss his employment with the BBC. In April, he resigned from the BBC on "medical advice". After Edwards' criminal conviction in July 2024, the young person said he believed Edwards had groomed him.

=== Criminal conviction ===
On 29 July 2024, the Metropolitan Police stated that Edwards had been charged with three counts of making indecent images of children, the legal definition of which includes downloading images or receiving them through email or social media, even when unsolicited. The charges involved images allegedly shared in a WhatsApp chat between December 2020 and April 2022, comprising six category A images, 12 category B images and 19 category C images. Two of the category A images "showed a child aged between about seven and nine".

Edwards was sent 377 sexual images, of which 41 were indecent images of children, by Alex Williams, a man from Merthyr Tydfil. On 15 March 2024, Williams received a 12-month suspended sentence after pleading guilty to possessing and distributing category A, B and C images. Edwards was arrested on 8 November 2023, and charged on 26 June 2024 following authorisation from the Crown Prosecution Service. He pleaded guilty to all of the charges at Westminster Magistrates' Court on 31 July.

Following Edwards' conviction, the BBC began removing his appearances from some of its archive footage. The Doctor Who episode "Fear Her", featuring his voice, was removed from BBC iPlayer. The episode was reinstated months later with a replaced voice performance. It was reported that the BBC were considering removing his voice from the archived coverage of Elizabeth II's funeral and Charles III's coronation. A mural of Edwards in his hometown of Llangennech was painted over, and a plaque honouring him at Cardiff Castle was taken down. Mark Lawson wrote in The Guardian that Edwards' conviction would "rank as one of the greatest British public plunges from success and celebrity".

In August 2024, the BBC announced that it had asked Edwards to return more than £200,000 of the salary paid after his arrest in November 2023. The Chair of the BBC, Samir Shah, said Edwards had acted in bad faith by continuing to draw his salary. On 16 September 2024, Edwards was sentenced to six months in prison, suspended for two years, and placed on the sex offenders' register. He was also ordered to attend a sex offender treatment programme and pay £3,128 in costs and victim surcharge. Edwards' sentence was calculated by Chief Magistrate Paul Goldspring based on an initial one year imprisonment. Three months were deducted for mental health reasons and due to Edwards having no previous convictions. A third of the sentence was also deducted due to Edwards' early guilty plea, bringing the sentence down to six months.

Edwards' defence barrister, Philip Evans, said that his client wished "to apologise to the court" and those he had hurt.

=== Television drama ===
In January 2026, it was announced that a television drama, Power: The Downfall of Huw Edwards would air on Channel 5, starring Martin Clunes as Edwards. Dan Davies expressed concern over the production having been filmed so soon after the events depicted. Channel 5 defended the production, saying that a young man alleged to be groomed by Edwards, fictionalised as "Ryan Davies", worked with producers on the script. The programme was broadcast on 24 March 2026. Edwards released a statement criticising the drama, saying that it had "made no attempt" to verify its story, and stated that he planned to eventually share his side of the story.

== Filmography ==
=== Television ===
Year	Title	Role
2003–2023	BBC News at Ten	Presenter
2003–2023	BBC News at Six	Presenter
2003–2023	BBC News at One	Presenter
2003–2023	BBC Weekend News	Presenter
2003–2023	BBC News channel	Presenter
2006	Doctor Who	Commentator; Episode: "Fear Her"
2011	Wedding of Prince William and Catherine Middleton	
2012	Diamond Jubilee of Elizabeth II	
2015	2015 United Kingdom general election coverage	Co-presenter and later lead presenter
2016	2016 European Union membership referendum coverage	Co-presenter of BBC coverage
2018	Wedding of Prince Harry and Meghan Markle	
2019	2019 United Kingdom general election coverage	Co-presenter and later lead presenter
2021	Funeral of Prince Philip, Duke of Edinburgh	Presenter of BBC coverage
2022	Platinum Jubilee of Elizabeth II	
2022	Death and state funeral of Elizabeth II	Presenter of BBC coverage
2022	Wales: Who Do We Think We Are? with Huw Edwards	Presenter
2023	Coronation of Charles III and Camilla	Presenter of BBC coverage

=== Film ===
Year	Title	Role	Notes
2012	Skyfall	Himself	Cameo

== Awards ==
Year	Award		Representative work	Result
2001	BAFTA Cymru	Best Onscreen Presenter		Won
2002	BAFTA Cymru	Best Onscreen Presenter		Won
2003	BAFTA Cymru	Best Onscreen Presenter	The Exchange	Won
2004	BAFTA Cymru	Best Onscreen Presenter	The Story of Welsh	Won
2005	BAFTA Cymru	Best Onscreen Presenter		Won
2010	BAFTA Cymru	Best Onscreen Presenter	The Prince and the Plotter	Won
2012	BAFTA Cymru	Best Onscreen Presenter	Llanelli Riots – Fire in the West	Nominated

== Bibliography ==
- 2009, Capeli Llanelli: Our Rich Heritage, Carmarthenshire County Council, ISBN 0906821789
- 2014, City Mission – the Story of London's Welsh Chapels, Y Lolfa, Tal-y-bont, ISBN 1847719058

== See also ==
- List of former BBC newsreaders and journalists

Media offices
Preceded by Anna Ford	Main Presenter of BBC News at Six; 1999–2003	Succeeded by George Alagiah and Sophie Raworth
Preceded by Peter Sissons	Main Presenter of BBC News at Ten; 2003–2023	Succeeded by TBA
Preceded by David Dimbleby as host until 2017	Host of BBC Election Night Coverage; 2019	Succeeded by Laura Kuenssberg and Clive Myrie
New show	Main Presenter of BBC News at Five; 2006–2020	on hiatus
