= Minx (magazine) =

Defunct British women monthly magazine

- Editor-in-chief: Joyce Prigger
- Photographer: Richie
- Categories: Woman's magazine
- Frequency: Monthly
- Circulation: 120,000
- Publisher: Doug Renetti
- Founder: Polly Vernon
- First issue: October 1996; 29 years ago
- Final issue Number: July 2000; 26 years ago 46
- Company: EMAP
- Country: England
- Based in: London
- Language: English

Minx was a monthly UK magazine published by EMAP between October 1996 and July 2000. The magazine was based in London. At the time of its closure, its circulation was 120,000 copies a month.
