= Mark Kermode =

English film critic (born 1963)

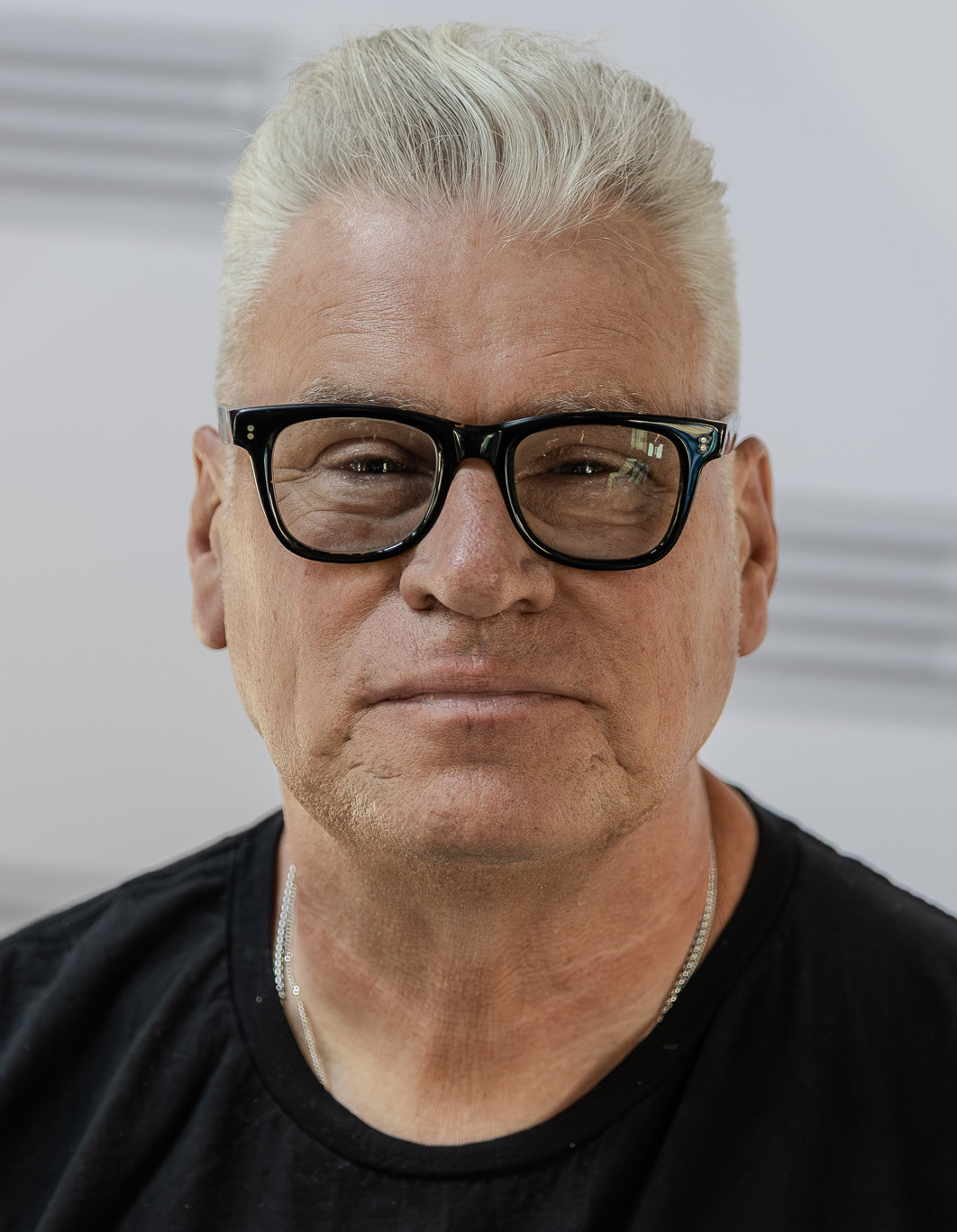
- Kermode at the 2025 Edinburgh International Book Festival
- Born: Mark Fairey; 2 July 1963 (age 63); London, England
- Education: St Mary's CoE Primary School, Finchley, Haberdashers' Aske's Boys' School; University of Manchester
- Occupations: Film critic; presenter; writer; musician
- Employer: Freelance
- Television: The Film Review; The Culture Show; Mark Kermode's Secrets of Cinema
- Spouse: Linda Ruth Williams (m. 1991)
- Children: 2

Mark Kermode (/ˈkɜːrˌmoʊd/, KUR-moh-d; né Fairey; born 2 July 1963) is an English film critic, musician, radio presenter, television presenter, author and podcaster. He is the co-presenter (with Ellen E. Jones) of the BBC Radio 4 programme Screenshot, and co-presenter (alongside long-time collaborator Simon Mayo) of the film-review podcast Kermode & Mayo's Take. Kermode is a regular contributor to The Observer, for which he was chief film critic between September 2013 and September 2023.

Kermode is the author of several books on film and music, including It's Only a Movie; The Good, the Bad and the Multiplex; Hatchet Job; and How Does It Feel?. He is the co-author of Hollywood: Sixty Great Years (with Jack Lodge, John Russell Taylor, Adrian Turner, Douglas Jarvis and David Castell), The Movie Doctors (with Simon Mayo), and Mark Kermode's Surround Sound (with Jenny Nelson). He has also written three volumes for the BFI's Modern Classics series – on The Exorcist, The Shawshank Redemption and Silent Running. Since the late 1980s he has contributed to the BFI's film magazine Sight & Sound and its predecessor The Monthly Film Bulletin, and since January 2016 he has presented a monthly live show, MK3D, at the British Film Institute (BFI), South Bank. It is the BFI's longest-running live show.

Kermode previously co-presented the BBC Radio 5 Live show Kermode and Mayo's Film Review, and previously co-presented the BBC Two arts programme The Culture Show. Between 2018 and 2021, he co-wrote and presented three seasons of the BBC Four film documentary series Mark Kermode's Secrets of Cinema, and between 2019 and 2024 he presented a weekly film music show on Scala Radio. He is a member of the British Academy of Film and Television Arts and a founding member of the skiffle band the Dodge Brothers, for which he plays double bass. Since 2008, the Dodge Brothers (with Neil Brand) have provided live accompaniment for silent films such as Beggars of Life, Hell's Hinges, White Oak and The Ghost That Never Returns.

== Early life ==
Kermode was born in the Royal Free Hospital in the London Borough of Camden. He was educated at the state-funded Church of England primary school St Mary's at Finchley, and was granted a Barnet-council-funded free place at The Haberdashers' Aske's Boys' School in Elstree, Hertfordshire under the Direct grant grammar school scheme in 1974, at the same time as actor Jason Isaacs.

Kermode's mother was a GP, who was born in Douglas, Isle of Man, and practised in Golders Green, north London. His father, the son of a travelling flour salesman, worked in the London Hospital in Whitechapel. His grandmother was Swiss German. Mark was raised as a Methodist, and later became a member of the Church of England. His parents divorced when he was in his early twenties, and he subsequently changed his surname to his Manx mother's maiden name by deed poll. He earned his PhD in English at the University of Manchester in 1991, writing a thesis on horror fiction. While in Manchester, he lived in the notorious Hulme Crescents estate.

== Film criticism ==
Kermode began his film career as a print journalist, writing for Manchester's City Life, and then Time Out and NME in London. He has subsequently written for a range of publications including The Guardian, The Observer, The Independent, Vox, Empire, Flicks, 20/20, Fangoria, Video Watchdog and Neon.

Kermode began working as a film broadcaster on LBC in 1988, after which he moved to BBC Radio 5 (later rebranded as 5Live). Between February 1992 and October 1993, he was the resident film reviewer on BBC Radio 5's Morning Edition with Danny Baker. He became the film critic for BBC Radio 1 in 1993, on a regular Thursday night slot called Cult Film Corner on Mark Radcliffe's Graveyard Shift session. He later moved to Simon Mayo's BBC Radio 1 morning show. He hosted a movie review show with Mary Anne Hobbs on Radio 1 on Tuesday nights called ClingFilm.

From 2001 until 2022, Kermode reviewed and debated new film releases with Mayo on the BBC Radio 5 Live show Kermode and Mayo's Film Review. The programme won Gold in the Speech Award category at the 2009 Sony Radio Academy Awards on 11 May 2009. On 11 March 2022, it was announced by Simon Mayo, at the start of Kermode and Mayo's Film Review, that the last episode would be broadcast on 1 April 2022.

Kermode and Mayo launched a non-BBC film and television podcast called Kermode & Mayo's Take in May 2022.

Kermode has worked on film-related documentaries including The Fear of God: 25 Years of The Exorcist, Hell on Earth: The Desecration and Resurrection of Ken Russell's The Devils, Alien: Evolution, On the Edge of Blade Runner, Mantrap: Straw Dogs – The Final Cut, Shawshank: The Redeeming Feature, The Poughkeepsie Shuffle: Tracing the French Connection, Salò: Fade to Black, The Real Linda Lovelace and The Cult of The Wicker Man.

From 2001 to 2005, Kermode reviewed films each week for the New Statesman. Prior to becoming chief film critic in 2013, he wrote "Mark Kermode's DVD round-up" for The Observer, a weekly review of the latest releases. He also writes for the British Film Institute's Sight and Sound magazine. From 1995 to 2001, Kermode was a film critic and presenter for Film4 and Channel 4, presenting the weekly Extreme Cinema strand. He has written and presented documentaries for Channel 4 and the BBC, and until 2023 appeared on The Film Review for BBC News at Five. For BBC Two's The Culture Show, Kermode hosted an annual "Kermode Awards" episode, which presented statuettes to actors and directors not nominated for Academy Awards that year.

In 2002, Kermode challenged the British Board of Film Classification (BBFC), the censor for film in the UK, about its cuts to the 1972 film The Last House on the Left. In 2008, the BBFC allowed the film to be re-released uncut. He has since stated that the BBFC do a good job in an impossible situation and expressed his approval of their decisions.

In a 2012 Sight & Sound poll of cinema's greatest films, Kermode indicated his ten favourites, a list later published in order of preference in his book Hatchet Job, as The Exorcist, A Matter of Life and Death, The Devils, It's a Wonderful Life, Don't Look Now, Pan's Labyrinth, Mary Poppins, Brazil, Eyes Without a Face and The Seventh Seal.

From September 2013 to September 2023, Kermode was the chief film critic for The Observer.

In 2018, he began to present his own documentary series Mark Kermode's Secrets of Cinema on BBC Four. A second series followed, as well as disaster movie, Christmas, and Oscar winners specials.

Between 2019 and 2024, Kermode presented a soundtrack-themed show on classical radio station Scala Radio.

Kermode produces an annual "best-of-the-year" and "worst-of-the-year" movie lists, thereby providing an overview of his critical preferences. His top choices were:

Kermode's best films of the year
Year	Best Film	Citation	Worst Film	Citation
1996	Crash			
1997	Boogie Nights			
1998	Festen aka The Celebration			
1999	Audition			
2000	Erin Brockovich			
2001	Ghost World			
2002	Punch-Drunk Love			
2003	City of God			
2004	Dogville and Eternal Sunshine of the Spotless Mind			
2005	A History of Violence			
2006	Pan's Labyrinth			
2007	The Assassination of Jesse James by the Coward Robert Ford		Good Luck Chuck	
2008	Of Time and the City		Sex and the City	
2009	Let the Right One In		Transformers: Revenge of the Fallen	
2010	Inception		Sex and the City 2	
2011	We Need to Talk About Kevin		New Year's Eve	
2012	A Royal Affair and Berberian Sound Studio		Keith Lemon: The Film	
2013	12 Years a Slave and Good Vibrations		Pain & Gain	
2014	The Babadook		Transformers: Age of Extinction	
2015	Inside Out		Entourage	
2016	Under the Shadow		Dirty Grandpa	
2017	Raw		Wolves at the Door	
2018	Leave No Trace		Show Dogs	
2019	Bait			
2020	Saint Maud			
2021	Petite Maman			
2022	Aftersun			
2023	Past Lives		The Exorcist: Believer	
2024	The Substance		Megalopolis	
2025	Die My Love		Tron: Ares	

Kermode's best films of the decade
Decade	Film	Citation
1990s	Land and Freedom	
2000s	Pan's Labyrinth	
2010s	Bait	

== Bibliography ==
- Hollywood: Sixty Great Years (1992), with Jack Lodge, John Russell Taylor, Adrian Turner, Douglas Jarvis, Adrian Castell
- BFI Modern Classics: The Exorcist (1997)
- BFI Modern Classics: The Shawshank Redemption (2003)
- It's Only a Movie: Reel Life Adventures of a Film Obsessive (2010)
- The Good, The Bad and The Multiplex: What's Wrong with Modern Movies? (2011)
- Hatchet Job: Love Movies, Hate Critics (2013)
- BFI Modern Classics: Silent Running (2014)
- The Movie Doctors (2015), with Simon Mayo
- How Does It Feel? A Life of Musical Misadventures (2018)
- Mark Kermode's Surround Sound (2025), with Jenny Nelson

== Other writing ==
In February 2010, Random House released his autobiography, It's Only a Movie, which he describes as being "inspired by real events". Its publication was accompanied by a UK tour. In September 2011, he released a follow-up book entitled The Good, the Bad and the Multiplex, in which he expresses his opinions on the good and bad of modern films, and vehemently criticizes the modern multiplex experience and the 3D film craze that had grown in the years immediately preceding the book's publication. In 2013, Picador published Hatchet Job: Love Movies, Hate Critics in which he examines whether professional "traditional" film critics still have a role in a culture of ever increasing numbers of online bloggers and amateur critics.

In 2017, he collaborated with his idol William Friedkin on the feature documentary The Devil and Father Amorth, as a writer. The film had its first showing at the Venice Film Festival on 31 August 2017.

== Other work ==
Kermode was a regular presenter on BBC Two's The Culture Show and appeared regularly on Newsnight Review. During a 2006 interview with Kermode for The Culture Show in Los Angeles, Werner Herzog was shot with an air rifle. Herzog appeared unflustered, later stating: "It was not a significant bullet. I am not afraid".

Kermode co-hosted an early 1990s afternoon magazine show on BBC Radio 5 called A Game of Two Halves, alongside former Blue Peter presenter Caron Keating.

Kermode appeared in a cameo role as himself in the revival of the BBC's Absolutely Fabulous on 1 January 2012.

In April 2008, Kermode started a twice-weekly video blog hosted on the BBC website, in which he discussed films and recounts anecdotes. He retired the podcast for its tenth anniversary at the close of 2018, with special episodes on his most and least favourite movies of the previous decade.

Kermode has recorded DVD, Blu-ray and 4K Ultra HD audio commentaries for Tommy (with Ken Russell), The Devils (with Ken Russell and Mike Bradsell), The Ninth Configuration (with William Peter Blatty), The Wicker Man (with Edward Woodward, Christopher Lee and Robin Hardy), Gregory's Girl, Cruising (with William Friedkin), Bait, Enys Men (both with Mark Jenkin) and (with Peter O'Toole) Becket. He appears in the DVD extras of Lost in La Mancha, interviewing Terry Gilliam, and Pan's Labyrinth, in which he interviews Guillermo del Toro about the film, which he has called a masterpiece. Kermode has written books, published by the BFI in its Modern Classics series, on The Exorcist, Silent Running and The Shawshank Redemption and his documentary for Channel 4, Shawshank: The Redeeming Feature, is on the film's tenth anniversary special edition DVD.

Kermode's family connections with the Isle of Man have led to him playing a role in Manx culture and the arts. This has seen him host various talks on the island. He has also been involved with the annual Isle of Man Film Festival.

Kermode became patron of the Sir John Hurt Film Trust in November 2019. He is a visiting fellow at the University of Southampton.

== Music ==
Kermode played double bass for a skiffle/rockabilly band called the Railtown Bottlers in the early 1990s. They were the house band on the BBC show Danny Baker After All for a series, starting in 1993, in which he performed with the Madness lead singer Suggs, Nick Heyward, Alison Moyet, Aimee Mann, Nanci Griffith, Tim Finn and Squeeze. In 2001 he formed skiffle quartet the Dodge Brothers, playing double bass.

Talking about playing the chromatic harmonica with an orchestra at the Royal Festival Hall, he said: "Somehow I got away with it. You can listen to it. It's not terrible, it's not brilliant, but it's fine." Kermode says that sheer persistence is the key to his musical success: "I'd rate enthusiasm and persistence over talent. And that's been a guiding light, that you shouldn't be put off by being unprepared or technically inept. I have managed to surround myself with other people who can play. And actually that's the trick".

== Personal life ==
Kermode is married to Linda Ruth Williams, a professor who lectures on film at the University of Exeter. From October to November 2004, they jointly curated a History of the Horror Film season and exhibition at the National Film Theatre in London. Kermode and Williams have two children.

Kermode has been described as "a feminist, a near vegetarian (he eats fish), a churchgoer and a straight-arrow spouse who just happens to enjoy seeing people's heads explode across a cinema screen".

In the mid-1980s, Kermode was an "affiliate" of the Revolutionary Communist Group (RCG) and was involved in the Viraj Mendis Defence Campaign, against the deportation of one of the group's members to Sri Lanka. This developed into a high-profile national campaign involving people from left-wing groups such as the RCG, local residents of Manchester and extending to church leaders and Labour Party Members of Parliament. Kermode describes himself in this period as "a red-flag waving bolshie bore with a subscription to Fight Racism Fight Imperialism and no sense of humour".

== Awards and honours ==
Year	Ceremony	Award	Result
2010	Sony Radio Academy Awards	Best Specialist Contributor of the Year	Gold
2009	Sony Radio Academy Awards	Speech Award	Gold

Kermode is a patron of the charitable trust of the Phoenix Cinema in North London, which was his favourite cinema during his childhood in East Finchley. The tenth-anniversary episode of Kermode and Mayo's Film Review was broadcast from the venue as part of its relaunch celebrations in 2010.

In 2013, Kermode was appointed an Island of Culture Patron by the Isle of Man Arts Council.

In 2016, Kermode was made an honorary Doctor of Letters at the University of Winchester.

In 2018, Kermode was appointed Honorary Professor in the Film Studies Department at the University of Exeter.
