= Peter Sissons =

English journalist and broadcaster (1942–2019)

- Born: Peter George Sissons; 17 July 1942; Liverpool, England
- Died: 1 October 2019 (aged 77); Maidstone, Kent, England
- Education: University College, Oxford
- Years active: 1964–2009
- Employer(s): ITN, British Broadcasting Corporation
- Known for: Broadcast journalism
- Notable credits: ITV News (ITN); Channel 4 News; Question Time; BBC News
- Spouse: Sylvia Bennett (m. 1965)
- Children: 3

Peter George Sissons (17 July 1942 – 1 October 2019) was an English journalist and broadcaster. He was a newscaster for ITN, providing bulletins on ITV and Channel 4, before becoming the presenter of the BBC's Question Time between 1989 and 1993, and a presenter of the BBC Nine O'Clock News and Ten O'Clock News between 1993 and 2003. He retired from the BBC in 2009 and died in 2019 from leukaemia at the age of 77.

== Early life ==
Sissons was born at Smithdown Road Hospital in Liverpool, England on 17 July 1942. He was the third of four brothers, sons of Merchant Navy officer George Robert Percival Sissons and his wife Elsie Emma (Evans), an employee in a department store. He attended Dovedale Junior School with John Lennon and Jimmy Tarbuck, passed the eleven-plus and attended the Liverpool Institute High School for Boys from 1953 to 1961 with the theatre producer Bill Kenwright, the politician Steven Norris, and George Harrison and Paul McCartney from the Beatles.

Sissons studied philosophy, politics and economics at University College, Oxford, where he was treasurer of the University College Players, with whom he also acted, produced, directed and organised.

== Career ==
=== ITN ===
Sissons joined ITN in 1964, working his way up to the role of journalist. He was wounded by gunfire whilst covering the Biafran War in 1968, sustaining severe nerve damage in his left leg. After recovering from his injuries, he became ITN's Industrial Editor, covering many high-profile disputes during the 1970s. On 6 September 1976, Sissons joined the list of presenters of ITN's lunchtime News at One bulletin, alternating with Leonard Parkin. He also co-presented ITN's coverage of the 1983 general election with Sir Alastair Burnet and Martyn Lewis, and again in 1987 with Burnet and Alastair Stewart.

In 1982, Sissons, along with Trevor McDonald and Sarah Hogg, presented the first edition of Channel 4 News. He remained on the programme for seven years, anchoring the only debate between National Union of Mineworkers leader Arthur Scargill and National Coal Board leader Ian MacGregor during the 1984–85 miners' strike. He was also the presenter on the night of the Lockerbie bombing in December 1988. In early 1989, Sissons received a death threat following his interview of an Iranian representative as part of the reaction surrounding the publication of The Satanic Verses, with the fatwa covering Salman Rushdie extended to cover him as well.

Sissons left ITN in 1989 to join the BBC.

=== BBC ===
In June 1989, Sissons took over from Sir Robin Day as the presenter of Question Time. He continued until December 1993, when he was succeeded by David Dimbleby. He co-presented the BBC's coverage of the 1992 general election with Dimbleby and Peter Snow.

From 1993, and for some years afterwards, he hosted Breakfast with Frost on Sunday mornings when regular host David Frost was unavailable.

Between 1989 and 1994, he co-hosted the BBC Six O'Clock News after which he moved to present BBC Nine O'Clock News and he stayed with the programme when it became Ten O'Clock News. He was dropped from this position in January 2003. Sissons reportedly accused the BBC of ageism in response to its decision to remove him from the bulletin.

In 2002, Sissons announced the death of the Queen Mother on the BBC. This broadcast created controversy and criticism from some newspapers as he wore a burgundy tie and not a black one, deemed more appropriate for such news. He later defended his choice and a senior BBC source said: "We thought if the newsreader suddenly rushed off screen to change into a black tie for the announcement it would be a distraction for viewers."

Sissons subsequently presented weekend afternoons on BBC News 24, the corporation's rolling news channel, although until 2004 he still occasionally appeared on the Ten O'Clock News when Huw Edwards, Fiona Bruce and Darren Jordon were unavailable. Sissons also presented News 24 Sunday, the replacement for Andrew Marr's BBC One programme The Andrew Marr Show when it was off air during the summer. He also occasionally presented weekend bulletins on BBC One.

He retired from the BBC in 2009, announcing on 12 June his intention to retire in the summer in order to write his memoirs.

Sissons cited a 2009 interview he conducted with Harriet Harman as the final catalyst for his decision to leave the BBC. He noted how producers seemed "twitchy" about leaving him to interview the Labour politician unsupervised, and that those producers contacting him with advice "seemed to be fully paid-up members of her fan club." Sissons noted his shock at being urged not to raise the issue of a breaking controversy surrounding Gordon Brown failing to invite the Queen to a D-Day commemoration event, because it was "only a campaign being run by the Daily Mail". He asked the question anyhow, and upon arriving home afterwards decided he no longer wished to work for the organisation.

== Autobiography ==
Following his retirement, Sissons published his 2011 autobiography When One Door Closes, in which he was highly critical of his former employer, the BBC. He argued that the organisation had a left-wing mindset "in its very DNA" and that BBC News had a bias towards New Labour, the United Nations, the European Union, environmental groups, Islam, ethnic minorities, and women. He wrote, "I am in no doubt that the majority of BBC staff vote for political parties of the Left". Sissons also highlighted the BBC's corresponding bias towards the Independent and Guardian newspapers, stating "producers refer to them routinely for the line to take on running stories, and for inspiration on which items to cover."

== Personal life ==
Sissons married his wife Sylvia (née Bennett) at All Saints, Stoneycroft on 24 July 1965. They had three children, one of whom, Kate Sissons, is an actress. Sissons and his wife lived in Sevenoaks, Kent, and had a second home on the island of Barbados.

Sissons was a Liverpool John Moores University Honorary Fellow and delivered a lecture on 19 June 2008 speaking about the city of Liverpool. He was a lifelong supporter of Liverpool Football Club.

== Death ==
Sissons died at the age of 77 on 1 October 2019 at the Maidstone Hospital in Kent from leukaemia. The Director-General of the BBC, Lord Hall of Birkenhead, hailed him as "one of the great television figures of his time". Other tributes to Sissons were paid by Huw Edwards, Tony Blair, Piers Morgan, Simon McCoy and Jon Snow. Sissons' former classmate Paul McCartney posted a tribute on his website. There was a funeral service for Sissons at St Nicholas Church, Sevenoaks on 18 October.
