= Reeta Chakrabarti =

British journalist and television presenter

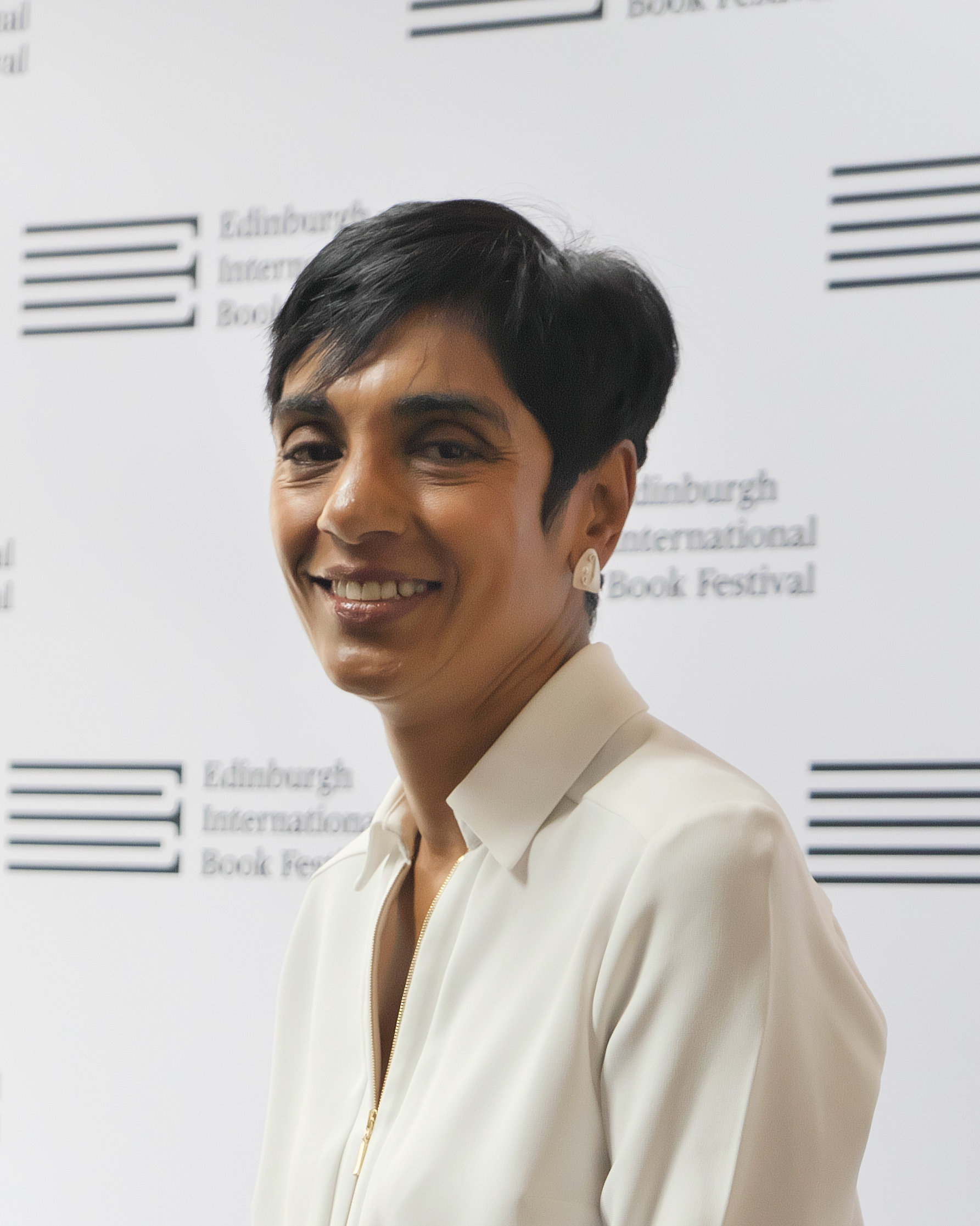
- Reeta Chakrabarti at the 2025 Edinburgh International Book Festival
- Born: 12 December 1964 (age 61); Ealing, England, UK
- Education: Exeter College, Oxford (BA)
- Occupations: Journalist, news presenter
- Employer: BBC
- Spouse: Paul Hamilton (m. 1992)
- Children: 3
- Relatives: Lolita Chakrabarti (sister)

Reeta Chakrabarti (born 12 December 1964) is a British journalist, Chief News Presenter and correspondent for BBC News. She is known for presenting BBC News at Six, BBC News at Ten and BBC Weekend News, and has reported extensively in the UK and abroad for BBC News.

Chakrabarti is also an author.

== Early life ==
Reeta Chakrabarti was born on 12 December 1964 in London to an Indian Bengali family and was raised in Hull and Birmingham. As a teenager she lived in Calcutta, attending the Calcutta International School and King Edward VI High School for Girls.

Chakrabarti studied English and French at Exeter College, Oxford, from 1984 to 1988, including a year in France. Of her time at Oxford, Chakrabarti said, "I loved my time there. There weren't – then – many people from my background at university. But that didn't stop my experience from being overwhelmingly good."

== Career ==
=== BBC Radio 4 ===
Chakrabarti started as a producer on BBC Radio 4, working on the Today programme, The World at One and PM before becoming a reporter on 5 Live Breakfast

=== BBC Radio 1 ===
In 1992, she started working at BBC Radio 1, specifically Newsbeat, writing and delivering news bulletins for Steve Wright in the Afternoon

=== BBC News ===
In 1997 she became one of the BBC's community affairs correspondents, covering the Stephen Lawrence inquest and subsequent public inquiry inquiry and its landmark final report. She also covered home affairs including the Damilola Taylor murder trial and Health.

As a political correspondent at Westminster from 1999 she appeared on both television and radio, reporting on political stories for BBC1, BBC2, the BBC News Channel, BBC Radio 4 and BBC Radio 5 Live. During this time Chakrabarti covered three UK general elections. Other notable stories included in 2006 the Cash for Honours affair and in 2009 the MPs’ expenses scandal.

Occasionally she presented real-time audience reactions, known during the 2010 UK General Election as ‘The Worm’

In 2010 she became Education correspondent and covered changes to university tuition fees and the effect on student numbers, the introduction of free schools, and school league tables.

In 2012, she carried out an investigation into the sale of essay writing services helping students cheat.

In 2013, Chakrabarti reported from Copenhagen on why Denmark regularly ranks as one of the happiest countries in which to live.

In the same year, she reported from Mumbai on why women were breaking through the glass ceiling in banking.

Also in 2013, Chakrabarti travelled to Seoul to report on why South Korean children performed so highly in international education league tables, and on the cost to their childhood.

In 2014, Chakrabarti was made a news presenter, presenting on BBC1 and the BBC News Channel. She combined her presenting role with continuing to report from home and abroad.

In March 2015, she reported from Kenya and Belgium on the contribution of Commonwealth soldiers to the British war effort in World War One

In April 2016, Chakrabarti reported from Warsaw on why Polish people were taking to the streets against a proposed ban on abortion

In June 2016, she reported from Swaziland on the country’s efforts to control rates of HIV, travelling with former international footballer David Beckham who was working in conjunction with UNICEF.

In September 2016, she travelled to Chile to interview the then President, Michelle Bachelet and to report on her attempt to reform the strict anti-abortion laws in the country.

In 2016 and 2017, Chakrabarti filed special reports from on board a ship in the Mediterranean during the European migrant crisis.

In early 2017, she reported from Albania on the trafficking of girls and women from there into the UK

In September 2017, she reported from Bangladesh on the Rohingya crisis and the suffering of civilians fleeing neighbouring Myanmar

She returned to Bangladesh in November 2017 to report on teenage Rohingya girls being forced into sex work, and again with the then Foreign Secretary Boris Johnson, who was visiting Bangladesh and Myanmar because of the crisis

Chakrabarti anchored the BBC's coverage of the 70th anniversary of the partition of India and Pakistan in 2017

She was part of the studio team for the 2019 UK general election, and the 2024 UK General Election, and also the 2020 US presidential election

In September 2020, Chakrabarti presented a report about her father-in-law Patrick Hamilton’s role in World War Two as a British soldier in Burma, part of what came to be known as 'the Forgotten Army'.

She was one of the presenters of the BBC's news coverage of COVID-19 during the lockdowns of 2020 and 2021. Chakrabarti and her colleague, political correspondent Chris Mason were forced into a three-hour broadcasting marathon on October 31, 2020 due to a severely delayed Downing Street briefing, after which they became known as ‘famous for filling.’

In March 2022 Chakrabarti was the main BBC presenter in Lviv in western Ukraine, anchoring the news bulletins 10 days after the 2022 Russian invasion of Ukraine.

In April 2022 she anchored the BBC's coverage of the French presidential election from Paris

In October 2023, she reported for two weeks from Israel after the Hamas attacks on October 7.

She has also presented on BBC World and Radio 4's The World Tonight.

== Special events ==
Chakrabarti has hosted numerous BBC programmes covering events of national and international importance.

In April 2018, she hosted the opening of the Commonwealth Heads of Government Meeting in Buckingham Palace, when Queen Elizabeth announced her wish that her son Charles should succeed her as head of the Commonwealth

Chakrabarti presented coverage of the annual Commonwealth Day service in 2017, 2024 and 2025

In January 2020, Chakrabarti presented a special programme from Auschwitz, on the 75th anniversary of its liberation

She was the host of the BBC’s coverage of the State Opening of Parliament in 2024

And in January 2025, Chakrabarti presented a commemoration in the Guildhall in London marking Holocaust Memorial Day, 80 years after the liberation of Auschwitz, for which she won a Royal Television Society award, and was also nominated for a BAFTA award.

In April 2025, Chakrabarti presented a special programme from Rome covering the funeral of Pope Francis

== Media appearances ==
In March 2015, Chakrabarti appeared on a Comic Relief Special episode of the quiz show Only Connect

In 2016, she took part in an episode of Celebrity Mastermind, choosing the Life and Poetry of John Keats as her specialist subject

In 2021, she appeared along with her daughter Roxana in a Celebrity Children In Need episode of Bargain Hunt

In November 2021, she featured as a guest participant in an episode of the BBC Two programme Celebrity Antiques Road Trip with fellow newsreader Clive Myrie.

In 2021, Chakrabarti was reported as defending newsreading as a skilled job, after her former BBC colleague Jeremy Paxman criticised it

In December 2022 Chakrabarti was the captain of the team for Exeter College, Oxford, which reached the semi-final in BBC Two's Christmas University Challenge. The team returned for a match against Trinity Hall, Cambridge in December 2025

== Author ==
Chakrabarti's first novel, Finding Belle, a family saga with echoes of Charlotte Bronte’s Jane Eyre, was published in May 2025 by HarperCollins. Her second novel, An Impossible Woman, is due to be published in the spring of 2027 also by HarperCollins, and is a fictionalised account of the twentieth-century Indian Hungarian artist Amrita Sher-Gil.

== Awards and honours ==
Chakrabarti was named an honorary fellow of Exeter College, Oxford in 2018. She was also made an honorary doctor of letters by York St John University in 2018, and became the Chancellor of York St John University in 2019 and an honorary fellow of University College, London in 2019 She has an honorary degree from Bath Spa University and is also an honorary fellow of the University of East London.

In 2008, Chakrabarti received an Asian Achievers Award

In 2025, she was given an Eastern Eye ACTA award for Best Presenter

== Personal life ==
Chakrabarti has been married to Paul Hamilton, professor of English at Queen Mary University of London, since 1992. They live in East Finchley, North London and have two sons and a daughter. Her younger sister, Lolita Chakrabarti is a British actress and writer and her ex-brother-in-law Adrian Lester (the couple divorced in 2024) is an actor.

Chakrabarti is a patron of Pan Intercultural Arts, a UK charity that uses the arts to empower marginalised young people and unlock their potential. She is also a patron of the Oxford University Media Society and has been a trustee for the Keats Shelley Memorial Association since 2021

She was a judge for the David Cohen Prize for Literature 2021 and chaired the panel of judges choosing the Costa Book of the Year 2021.[18] She was the chair of judges for the 2023 BBC Short Story Prize

She was also on the judging panel for the 2023 Laurel poetry prize

She was a guest judge for the Lucy Cavendish award 2023

Chakrabarti was on the final judging panel for the 2025 Nero Gold Prize
