= Ricardo P. Lloyd =

British actor

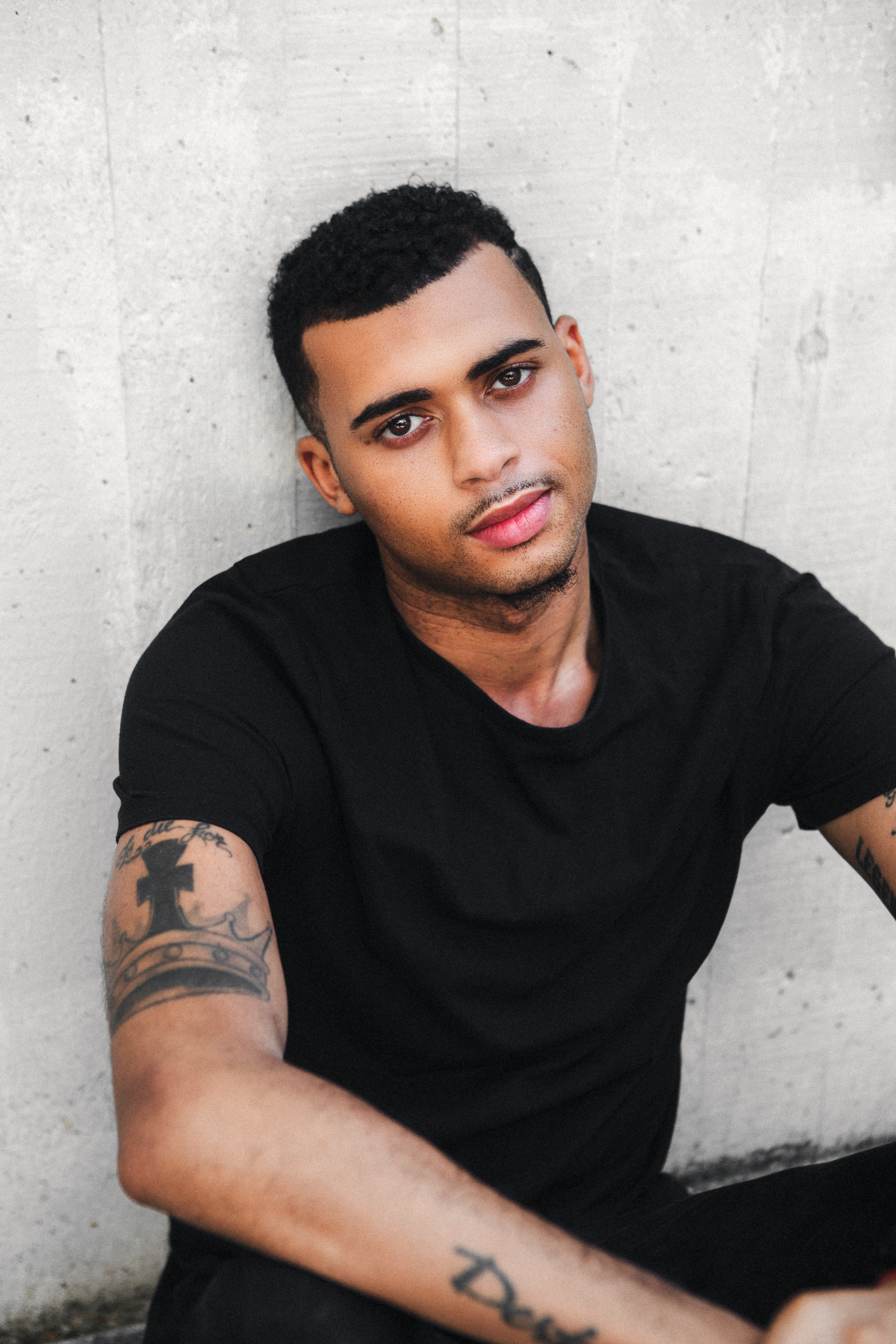
- Lloyd in 2021
- Born: 20 November 1993 (age 32); Ipswich, England
- Education: Anglia Ruskin University (MBA); Buckinghamshire New University (BA)
- Occupations: Actor, presenter, writer, producer, model
- Years active: 2013–present
- Height: 189 cm (6 ft 2 in)
- Website: ricardoplloyd.com

Ricardo P Lloyd (born 20 November 1993) is a British actor, presenter and writer. He began his career in theatre, appearing in productions, including those by Shakespeare's Globe. In 2020, The Voice named him one of the Top 20 to watch out for. In 2022, Lloyd presented and produced his own documentary for BBC Radio 4.

== Early life and education ==
Ricardo P Lloyd was born on 20 November 1993 in Ipswich, England. His grandparents were a part of the Windrush generation, migrating from Jamaica to England. Lloyd moved from Ipswich to London with his mother when he was very young. He grew up in the London Borough of Brent, attending Kensal Rise Primary School now known as Ark Franklin Primary Academy. In his teenage years, he went to the secondary school Capital City Academy, and performed in school productions of Bugsy Malone and West Side Story.

He then went down a bad path, hanging around with the wrong crowds trying to fit in, which led him to get into some fights and failing most of his GCSEs. Lloyd later turned his life around, staying at the school's sixth-form to retake some GCSEs and do an A-Level in drama.

However, staff continued to stereotype him. Lloyd eventually left Capital City Academy's sixth-form to pursue a BTEC Level 3 Extended Diploma in performing arts acting at Harrow College (2011–2013). The actor then went on to Buckinghamshire New University to study Performing Arts; Film TV & Stage at undergraduate level (2013–2016). After Lloyd received his BA Honours degree in 2016, he then did an MBA at Anglia Ruskin University (2016–2018) to enhance his skills in business.

== Career ==
Lloyd began his acting career in theatre, performing in various theatre shows. He then appeared in several short films. He made his professional stage debut in 2015 in a production of Animal Farm at Oxford House (settlement).

Lloyd subsequently starred in the short film University Life (2015) where he played the (lead) protagonist Anthony. The film was a runner-up in a BIFA short film competition. In February 2016, Lloyd played Karam in the stage production Fragile things performed at the Wycombe Swan Theatre. In the same year, he filmed a part in a short film titled Cussin.

In April 2019, Lloyd acted in Shakespeare Walks, where he took on the role of Snug (A Midsummer Night's Dream). He also performed in Shakespeare within the Abbey, produced by Shakespeare's Globe. Lloyd worked alongside Oscar-winning actor Mark Rylance and his wife Claire van Kampen. These shows were created to celebrate Shakespeare's birthday, brought alive by a company of different actors.

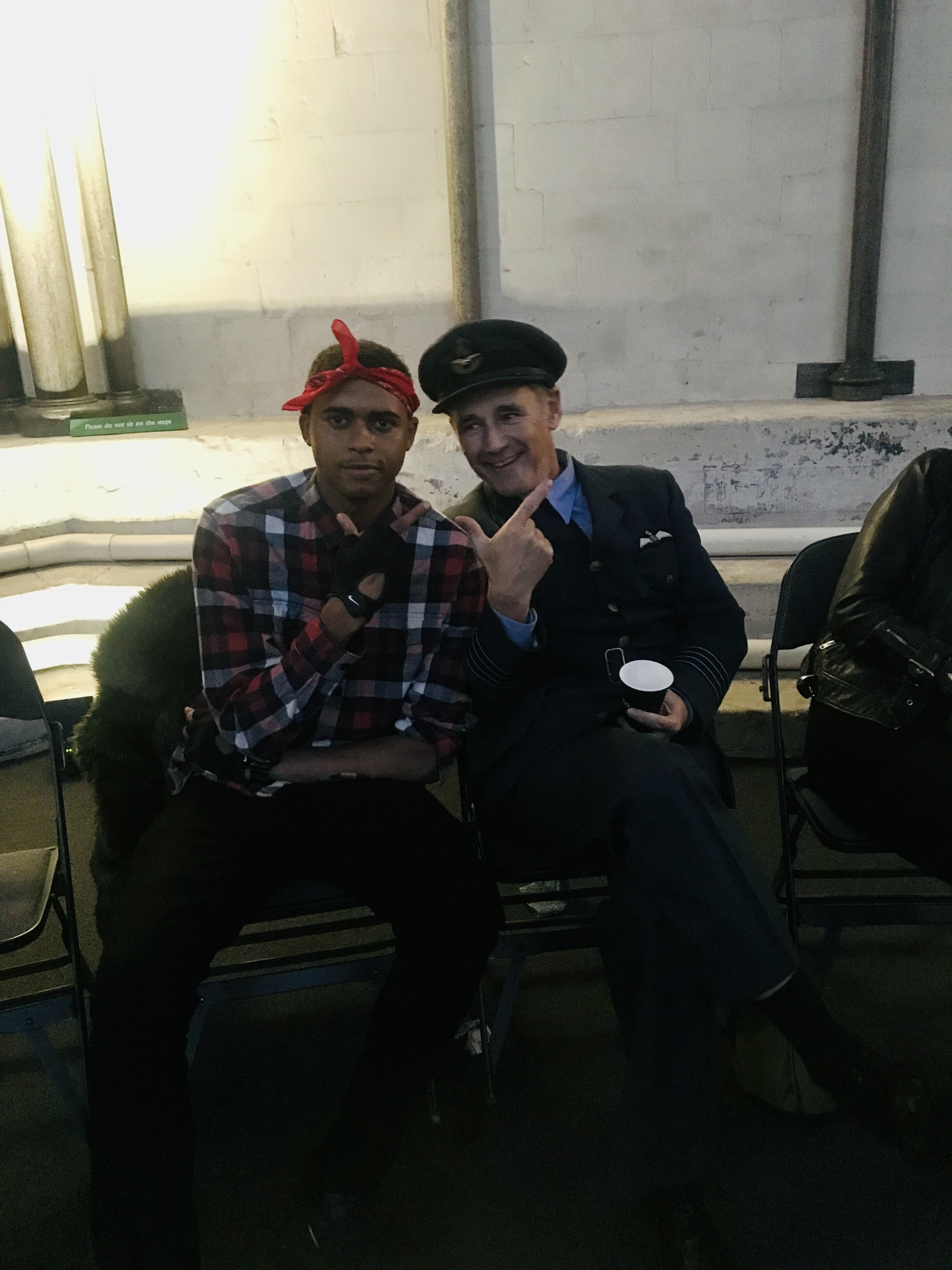

"one of the most moving celebrations of Shakespeare I've experienced" – Michael Billington The Guardian

In November 2019, Lloyd portrayed Romeo in the critically acclaimed topical (theatre) production Excluded, produced by Intermission Theatre, a company which helps disenfranchised teenagers stay away from crime. The play transplanted and re-imagined some of Shakespeare's iconic characters into a London secondary school as they prepared for their GCSEs, highlighting how the education system fails many young people. Lloyd received much praise for his performance.

On 3 November 2019, Lloyd made an appearance on BBC One's Sunday Morning Live season 10, episode 20, presented by Sean Fletcher and Ria Hebden. Lloyd performed a scene from Excluded with fellow cast and was then interviewed by Ria Hebden. He was seen wearing an eye patch with the word 'excluded' on it, created for him by British artist Eugene Ankomah. When interviewed by Vanessa Feltz on her BBC Radio London breakfast radio show (23 October 2019) what it meant, Lloyd said it was a symbol to represent how society "only chooses to see what they want to see concerning young people" or people who come from where he does.

Lloyd also appeared on ITV News London, where he candidly spoke out on the effects of school exclusions, saying: "When you exclude a child, you are essentially saying they're not good enough for society." He added, "A lot of my peers who have been excluded ended up in prison or dead."

Lloyd has a number of further credits. He worked on Creation Theatre Company's The Time Machine: A Virtual Reality (2020) in the West End. Lloyd performed at the Lyric Theatre as part of the Evolution festival (2020). He also starred in the documentary film Arts hole (2020), which he co-produced with Wendy Richardson and Tara Dominick. Lloyd appeared in Kar-go's promotional video for autonomous delivery UK launch (2020).

In 2021, Lloyd wrote, acted, produced and filmed his own short film titled Call It A Problem, to inspire youth and the community during the COVID-19 pandemic, teaming up with charities The People's FC and Teviot Rangers JFC.

Lloyd starred in the short film Con-Spiracies (2021), produced by the National Film and Television School, where he played lead character Jaden. He also performed a monologue to a select audience for the virtual event My Story, My Monologue hosted by BlackRock with thousands of employees watching.

In January 2022, it was announced that Lloyd would narrate the Audiobook of the crime novel Silenced by Jennie Ensor.

On Saturday, 9 April 2022, Lloyd played John Blanke at the National Maritime Museum part of the Caribbean Takeover celebrating black history. The event was an opportunity for visitors to discover the fusion of cultures from Africa, the Caribbean and Britain. It was the first time in the museum's history that an event was held of that magnitude celebrating black history. Lloyd was joined by other notable public figures including ITV The Chase's Shaun Wallace, as well as Leroy Logan.

In 2022, Lloyd played the lead character Johnny Smythe in the Docudrama Flying for Britain. The film follows Johnny's journey to recruitment into the wartime RAF and his experiences of combat flying as the navigator of a Stirling Bomber. The project was produced in partnership with Royal Airforce Museum and National Lottery Heritage Fund.

Lloyd was cast as lead character, Rapstar, in a Comedy short written by model Eunice Olumide commissioned by the BBC.

In April 2023, Lloyd portrayed George Augustus Polgreen, performing for the second time at the National Maritime Museum, for the second year of the Caribbean Takeover.

=== Presenting ===
Lloyd created and presented his own radio documentary entitled My Name Is Ricardo P Lloyd for BBC Radio 4, which received rave reviews. The program was listed as one of the top choice to check out by The Guardian, The times, Daily Star and countless others. According to The Daily Telegraph Lloyd is full of insight' It was broadcast nationally on 18 July 2022 at 11.00am and made available on BBC Sounds. The documentary features Aml Ameen and Death in Paradise star Tobi Bakare as well as leading people in the entertainment industry.

=== Recognition, industry supporters and awards ===
Lloyd has been cited as ‘One of Britain's most promising acting talents’ by My London. In 2020, Lloyd was recognized as a rising actor when The Voice listed him as one of the Top 20 ones to watch out for in business, sport, culture and politics. Additionally, Lloyd was nominated for a Blac award, an award celebration of the achievements of those of the African-Caribbean Community in the UK.

Lloyd has been supported and mentored by different industry leaders, including Hollywood A-listers such as Whoopi Goldberg, David Oyelowo, Naomie Harris, and Mark Rylance, who have encouraged him to continue to stretch himself as an artist and break through barriers in his industry.

In November 2021, The Guardian published an article that focused on Lloyd and actor David Harewood, comparing the actors' lives and careers. This was part of Black British culture matters, curated by Lenny Henry and Marcus Ryder for The Guardian's Saturday Culture Issue No 7.

On 28 August 2022, Lloyd won the Anglia Ruskin University Vice counsellor alumni Contribution to Culture award.

Lloyd was recognised and celebrated by Your Brent Magazine a magazine by Brent Council for Black History Month 2022 as one of the Black British stars from brent making an impact.

In October 2023 Anglia Ruskin University honored Lloyd by featuring him in an Exhibition ‘Celebrating a Legacy of Black Excellence’ at the ARU Cambridge campus alongside boxer David Haye recognizing them both for their achievements and cultural impact.

In 2023, Lloyd exceeded the noteworthy threshold of 100,000 subscribers on his official YouTube channel. As recognition of his achievement, Lloyd was awarded with a YouTube Creator Award.

In 2024, Ricardo P Lloyd was nominated for a Nela Academy Award for his notable acting and meaningful social and cultural contributions, ultimately winning the award.

=== Activism and advocacy ===
As well as being an actor, Ricardo P Lloyd is an activist. He continues to use his influence to publicly raise awareness for key social issues such as class discrimination, social exclusion, racism, and diversity in the UK.

Lloyd spoke boldly about the challenges many black British actors face in the industry. In 2021, he wrote an article for The Independent extensively discussing some of his own experiences of discrimination being a black British actor. He has also written articles for various publications including Radio Times, The Big Issue, The Voice, Student Pocket Guide.

=== Brand deals ===
Lloyd has a brand deal with Hidden Sea Wine, an Australian wine company. He has an equity stake in the company, he continues to act as an official ambassador, supporting their on going values of environmental responsibility they pledge to remove and recycle 10 plastic bottles from the ocean.

== Personal life ==
Lloyd is a practising Christian, he has spoken openly about how importance his faith is to him on platforms like Premier Christian Radio, saying it keeps him grounded. In 2021, he told Church Times: "Faith has enabled me to survive in this business: faith in God through Christ Jesus. I trust in him that he has a purpose regarding my life and career, and he knows what is best for me. I also need to have faith in myself, my abilities, my value. I have business skill-sets to help me create my own work. I no longer want to just survive, but thrive. I'm also trying to help other people who come from where I come from."

Lloyd revealed his favourite actor of all time is Sidney Poitier. He wrote a tribute to Poitier after hearing of his passing in January 2022, which was published by The Voice. He also is a fan of Michael Jackson since childhood and has said that Michael Jackson's life, career, artistry (work) has greatly inspired him.

Lloyd has also attributed his personal and artistic development to his attendance at Anna Scher's drama classes, acknowledging her influential role in shaping him as an individual and an overall artist.

In 2020, Lloyd personal life played out in the Print media early that year he was listed on The Voice's "top 20 ones to watch out for" and was working on several projects before the COVID-19 pandemic. Lloyd then found himself going through a dark period becoming homeless and going through different traumatic experiences. Lloyd spoke out about the lack of support many black men face.

The stories kept on circulating about the actor: "Police appeal after actor is attacked by unknown woman in Lambeth."

One journalist added: "Because of his facial scars Ricardo will also have to step away from the camera and put his acting career on pause."

== Credits ==
=== Stage ===
Year	Title	Role	Venue/Company	Notes
2015	Animal Farm	Farmer	Oxford House	Directed by Paul Sadot
2016	Fragile Things	Karam	Wycombe Swan, Oxford House	
2019	Shakespeare Walks (sweet love remember'd)	Snug (A Midsummer Night's Dream)	Shakespeare globe	Directed by Claire van Kampen (street theatre)
2019	Shakespeare within the Abbey	Benvolio & Ensemble	Westminster Abbey, Shakespeare's Globe	Directed by Claire van Kampen Lloyd performed alongside Mark Rylance, Martha Plimpton
2019	Excluded	Romeo	Knightsbridge, Intermission Youth Theatre	Critically acclaimed reimagined Shakespeare theatre production directed by Darren Raymond
2020	LYRIC EVOLUTION 2020	Jahieem	Lyric Theatre (Hammersmith)	Endz Part of their Selected Scratch Play Performances (2020)

=== Film ===
Year	Title	Role	Type	Notes
2015	University Life	Anthony	Short film	Runner-up in BIFA compepition in 2015
2016	Cussin	Lyrical Geezer	Short film	
2020	Arts hole	Self	Documentary film	Produced by Wendy Richardson and co-produced by Tara Dominick, Lloyd
2021	Call It A Problem	Shawn	Short film	Lloyd also is credited as writer and producer
2021	Conspiracies	Jaden	Short film	Produced by National Film and Television School
2022	Flying For Britain	Johnny Smythe	Docudrama	Funded by the Heritage Fund with support from Royal Air Force

=== Television ===
Year	Title	Role	Type	Notes
2019	Sunday Morning Live	Self-Performer (Guest appearance)	Television show	Season 10 Episode 20, In this episosde Lloyd makes an appearance he performs and is interviewed by Ria Hebden
2023	BBC Comedy AFRISH: AN AFRO SCOT IN BRIXTON	Rapstaar	Television show Comedy	Created by Eunice Olumide
2023	Mind Over Matter TV Show	Guest Presenter	Television show, Online Factual	Episode 5 Lloyd Presents on show

=== Radio ===
Year	Title	Role	Type	Notes
2022	BBC Radio 4 My Name Is Ricardo P Lloyd	Presenter	Radio documentary	Lloyd also has further credits on the show.

=== Music video ===
Song	Year	Artist	Notes
All things are possible	2021	Minister Taf	Music video by award-winning gospel artist, Lloyd plays lead character Robert in video.

=== Live Online ===
Year	Title	Role	Type	Notes
2021	My Story, My Monologue	Poet intruder	Virtual event	Hosted by BlackRock Lloyd performed a monologue to a live online audience as part of their event.

=== Audiobook ===
Year	Title	Role	Type	Notes
2023	Silenced by Jennie Ensor	Luke	Crime fiction	Voiceover/ narration, Published by Hobeck Books

=== Other ===
Year	Title	Role	Type	Notes
2020	The Time Machine: A Virtual Reality	Producer assistant	Site-specific theatre	Produced by Creation Theatre Company, written by Jonathan Holloway (playwright), directed by Natasha Rickman, Lloyd is credited as a Producer assistant on show.
2020	kar-go UK Official Launch	James	Promotional video	This was a part of their Autonomous UK delivery launch campaign (2020).
2021	Omnibus Theatre Workshop	Various	Workshop	New play development
2022	Caribbean Takeover (Walking Images)	John Blanke	Event	The National Maritime Museum
2023	Caribbean Takeover (Walking Images)	George Bridgetower	Event	The National Maritime Museum
2023	VOLUMETRIC CAPTURE (INTERNAL PROJECT)	Multi Characters, Presenter	Corporate	Company Wapping press/Synthesia
2023	Griswold - Community Reading	Police Officer	Rehearsed Reading	Angela J Davis New Play, The Playground Theatre

== Bibliography ==
=== Authored articles ===
- Lloyd P Ricardo (13 July 2021). ‘As a black British actor I have been Stereotyped one too many times’ The Independent
- Lloyd P Ricardo (18 January 2022). ‘How Sidney Poitier inspired me to be excellent and among the stars’ The Voice
- Lloyd P Ricardo (2022) WHY I AM SO OVER THE WILL SMITH OSCAR INCIDENT! The Student Pocket Guide
- Lloyd P Ricardo (15 July 2022) ‘I want to see the industry celebrate Black talent instead of pushing actors out’ Big Issue
- Lloyd P Ricardo (18 July 2022 ) ‘Diversity on and off screen should be the true end goal and not just tokenism’ Radio Times
- Lloyd P Ricardo (2023) ‘Overcoming Setbacks in the Entertainment Industry.’ Student Pocket Guide
- Lloyd P Ricardo (2023) ‘THE POWER OF PERSEVERANCE AND SELF-DETERMINATION, Student Pocket Guide
- Lloyd P Ricardo (2023) ‘On Taking Care of One's Self!’ Student Pocket Guide

== See also ==
- Black British people
- List of British actors
- List of people from the London Borough of Brent
