= List of people from the London Borough of Brent =

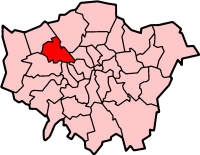
Location of the London Borough of Brent within Greater London

Among those who were born in the London Borough of Brent, or have dwelt within the borders of the modern borough are (alphabetical order):

== Notable residents ==
=== Academia and Research ===
- Raymond Gosling – scientist, born in and attended school in Wembley

=== Arts and Entertainment ===
- Nines MOBO award winning rapper from Harlesden, member of the notorious CSB (Crime Scene Boyz) A.K.A ICB (Ice City Boyz) A.K.A CRS (Church Road Soldiers)
- Tubby T - Anthony Robinson, 9 September 1974 – 22 May 2008 Most loved artist of 90/00s with hits like “Tales of the hood”
- General Levy – ragga deejay original junglist massive, formative years Harlesden and Wembley
- Riz Ahmed – actor, rapper and activist, born in Wembley
- Ricardo P Lloyd – actor from Harlesden and who grew up in North-west London
- Chizzy Akudolu – actress, born in Harlesden
- Lily Allen – singer-songwriter, actress and television presenter, lives in Kensal Green
- Gerry Anderson – producer, director and writer, producer of Thunderbirds lived in Kilburn and Neasden, educated at Kingsgate Infants School and Willesden County Grammar School
- Tracy-Ann Oberman – actress, Chrissie Watts in EastEnders, born in Brent
- Jane Asher – actress, author and entrepreneur, ex-girlfriend of Paul McCartney, born in Willesden
- David Baddiel – comedian, novelist and television presenter, educated at North West London Jewish Day School, lived in Dollis Hill.
- Doc Brown – rapper, comedian and actor, born in Kilburn, lived in Willesden
- Keisha Buchanan – singer-songwriter and member of girl group the Sugababes, born and raised in Kingsbury, attended Kingsbury High School
- Mutya Buena – singer-songwriter and member of girl group the Sugababes, born and raised in Kingsbury, attended Kingsbury High School
- Grace Carter – singer-songwriter, lives in Kensal Green
- Graham Cole – actor, born in Willesden
- Lenora Crichlow – actress, born and raised in Harlesden
- Diana Churchill – actress, born in Wembley
- Daniel Craig – actor, lives in Queen's Park
- Sophie Dahl – fashion model and author, lives in Kensal Green
- Paloma Faith – singer, lives in Kensal Green
- Phil Fearon – record producer and former singer (Galaxy) lived in Harlesden, educated at Willesden High School
- Ron Goodwin – composer, 633 Squadron, Those Magnificent Men in Their Flying Machines, film music, Golden Globe nominated, Willesden Grammar School
- Tamsin Greig – actress, grew up in Kilburn
- Lenny Henry – actor and comedian, lived in Wembley
- Mariah Idrissi – model, lives in Wembley Park
- Tony Kanal – born and raised in Kingsbury
- Maria Lawson – professional R&B singer and X-Factor, 2004 finalist, educated at Queens Park Community School
- Arthur Lucan – actor, lived at 11 Forty Lane, Wembley
- Annie Mac – DJ and presenter, lives in Queen's Park
- George Michael – singer-songwriter, lived in Kingsbury, educated at Kingsbury High School
- Sienna Miller – actress, lives in Kensal Green
- Keith Moon – drummer, born and lived in Wembley
- Cillian Murphy – actor, lives in Queen's Park
- Sophie Okonedo – actress, lived in Kenton
- Rita Ora – lives in Kensal Green
- George the Poet – rapper, born in Neasden
- John Neville – actor from Willesden
- Thandiwe Newton – lives in Kensal Green
- Laura Aikman – actress, born in Brent
- Maxine Nightingale – singer from Wembley
- Dev Patel – actor, from Sudbury
- Rod Price – guitarist from Willesden
- Shane Richie – actor, comedian, television presenter and singer, attended Willesden High School
- Julie Rogers – singer, educated at Kingsbury High School
- Gappy Ranks – international musician, artist, Reggae, Dancehall, born Harlesden
- Andrew Sachs – actor, lived in Kilburn
- Jay Sean – singer-songwriter, born in Harlesden
- John Sinclair – keyboardist, born in Wembley
- Zadie Smith – novelist, lives in Queen's Park
- Lady Sovereign – rapper, born and lived in Wembley
- John Tavener – composer, born in Wembley
- David Tress – artist, born in Wembley
- Twiggy – model, actress and singer, born in Neasden. Educated at Brondesbury and Kilburn High School
- Charles Venn – actor, Ray Dixon in EastEnders, born in Kilburn
- Sabrina Washington – singer, lead singer of Mis-Teeq, from Harlesden
- Charlie Watts – drummer and member of The Rolling Stones, born in Kingsbury, educated at Kingsbury High School, lived in Wembley
- Alfred Willmore - actor, designer, dramatist, writer and impresario born in Willesden 25 October 1899 died Dublin 6 March 1978 better known as Micheal Mac Liammoir.
- Lydia Wilson – actress, born in and lives in Queen's Park

=== Business and Finance ===
- Jerry Roberts – code breaker and businessman born in Wembley

=== Journalism and the Media ===
- Louis Theroux – documentary filmmaker and broadcaster, lives in Harlesden
- Shaun Wallace – barrister and television personality.

=== Politics and government ===
- Luciana Berger – Labour Co-operative MP for Liverpool Wavertree since 2010, from Wembley
- Steve Hilton – former director of strategy for Prime Minister David Cameron, lives in Kensal Green.
- Mick Whelan – General Secretary of the British trade union ASLEF, lives in Brent.

=== Sport ===
- Luther Blissett – ex-footballer, lived in Harlesden and educated at Willesden High School
- James DeGale – boxer
- Jerel Ifil – footballer, born in Wembley
- Jacob Murphy – footballer, born in Wembley
- Valda Osborn – figure skater, born in Wembley
- Matt Sparrow – footballer, born in Wembley
- Kieron St Aimie – footballer, born in Wembley
- Raheem Sterling – Chelsea F.C. and England national football team footballer, educated at Copland Community School
- Jerome Thomas – footballer, born in Wembley
- Gary Waddock – footballer, born in Kingsbury, grew up in Alperton.
- Ian Wright – ex footballer, lives in Kensal Green
- Stuart Pearce - former footballer, educated at Claremont High School in Kenton
- Yannick Bolasie- former Crystal Palace and Everton player, lived in Willesden
