= Cushnie =

Cushnie may refer to:

== People ==
- Carl Cushnie, businessman from the United Kingdom
- Carly Cushnie, founder with Michelle Ochs of American fashion house Cushnie et Ochs
- John Cushnie (1943–2009), landscape designer, author, journalist, and broadcaster on the BBC Radio 4 programme Gardeners' Question Time
- Mykal Cushnie (born 1980), Jamaican film director, film producer and editor
- David Lumsden, Baron of Cushnie (1933–2008), Scottish heritage advocate and businessman

== Places ==
- Cushnie, Queensland, a locality in the South Burnett Region, Australia
- Leochel-Cushnie, a parish in Aberdeenshire

== See also ==
- Cushi
