= Malvern Collegiate Institute =

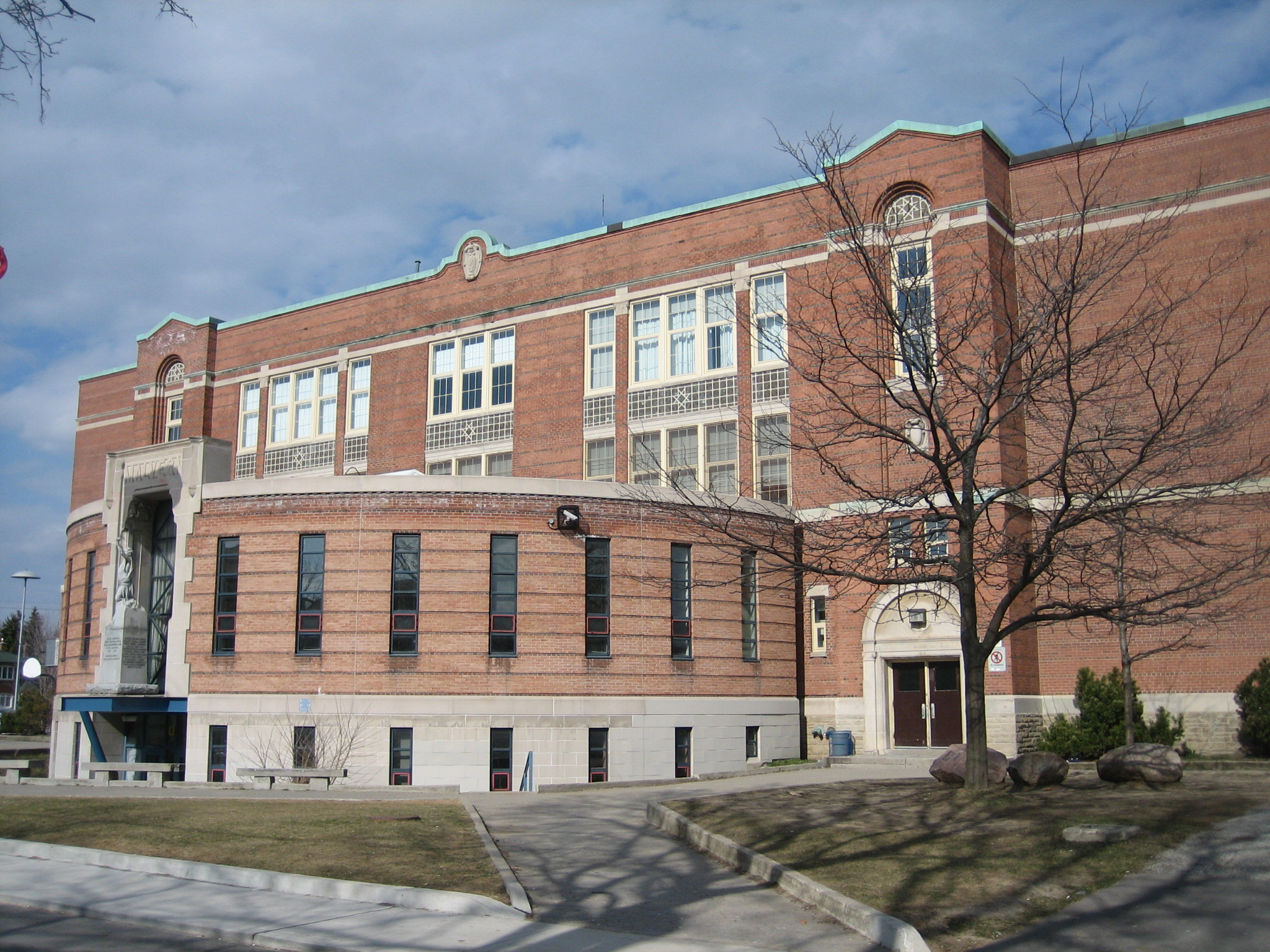

Location
- 55 Malvern Avenue; East Danforth, Toronto, Ontario, M4E 3E4; Canada; 43.68284°N 79.292901°W

Information
- Former names: East Toronto High School (1903–1910); Malvern High School (1910–1914)
- School type: High school
- Motto: Victrix Sapientia Fortunae (Wisdom Conquers Fortune)
- Founded: 1903
- School board: Toronto District School Board (Toronto Board of Education)
- Superintendent: Kwame Lennon
- Area trustee: Michelle Aarts; Ward 16
- School number: 5530 / 924520
- Principal: Christine Laurin
- Vice Principals: Sevil Tanrikulu; Cora Peisz
- Grades: 9-12
- Enrolment: 945 (2005-2006)
- Language: English, French
- Schedule type: Semestered
- Area: Main Street and Kingston Road
- Colours: Red and black
- Team name: Black Knights
- Website: schoolweb.tdsb.on.ca/malvernci
- Last updated: April 17, 2025

Malvern Collegiate Institute (Malvern CI, MCI or Malvern), previously known as East Toronto High School and Malvern High School, is a high school located in Toronto, Ontario, Canada part of the Toronto District School Board. Prior to 1998, it was part of the Toronto Board of Education.

The school was founded in 1903 by the Toronto Collegiate Institute Board and since then, Malvern has rooted in a long-standing history of academic and extra-curricular excellence with a close connection to the Beach community. The motto is Victrix Sapientia Fortunae ("Wisdom conquers fortune").

== History ==
Malvern C.I. was founded in 1903 as "East Toronto High School" by the Toronto Collegiate Institute Board in the mainly working class village of East Toronto. It opened in the original Mary Street School building on Mary St. (now Kimberley P.S. and Kimberley Ave.) when the elementary school moved into a new building on the same site. The TCIB was merged into the Toronto Board of Education in 1904, who bought a new property on Malvern Avenue (then known as Charles Street) in 1905 and opened a new building of four rooms in 1906. In 1908 East Toronto was annexed to Toronto, and the name "Charles Street" was changed to Malvern Avenue; in 1910 the Board renamed the school Malvern Avenue High School. In 1914, it became Malvern Avenue Collegiate and subsequently Malvern Collegiate Institute.

The statue that stands on the west side of the school on Malvern Avenue, just outside the library, was built in 1922 in honour of the students that had attended Malvern C.I. and died in World War I. In November 2011, a ceremony rededicating the statue was held, a week before Remembrance Day to commemorate the repairs done to the arm. Less than 48 hours later, the statue was vandalized. It now has added security.

Like other Ontario schools, Malvern had a 13th grade from 1921 to 1988; grade 13 was replaced by the Ontario Academic Credit for students starting high school in 1984. OAC continued to act as a fifth year of secondary education until it was phased out in 2003.

Despite sharing its name with the unrelated Malvern neighbourhood (located approximately 16.1 km (10.0 mi) northeast of the school) in Scarborough, Malvern Collegiate is located in the Beach neighbourhood, The Beaches.

On January 1, 1998, the TBE was dissolved and Malvern became part of the newly amalgamated Toronto District School Board.

Malvern celebrated its centennial in 2003 and Malvern at 110 in 2013.

In 2006, Toronto Life magazine stated that Malvern CI had the best English program in Toronto, a notable change from the 1980s, when the same magazine rated Malvern's English department as being in the bottom five of all Toronto collegiates.

The school's mascot is the Black Knight, and the school colours are double red and black. Its school song is Onward Malvern.

Its Concert and Marching band is renowned, and has played in many Santa Claus Parades, the official opening of the Toronto City Hall, for the Blue Jays, and the Grey Cup, to name a few, and garnered several awards over the years. Since 1960, the Malvern band has stood out for their uniform of red jackets with black and red kilts.

Malvern won the 2009 Anne Hope Award for its contributions in promoting human rights and equity education.

== Notable alumni ==
- Jack Kent Cooke
- Wray Downes
- Nathaniel Erskine-Smith
- Robert Fulford
- Glenn Gould
- Israel Halperin
- Norman Jewison
- Bruce Kidd
- Ailsa Land
- Lois Marshall
- Doris McCarthy
- Stacie Mistysyn
- Teresa Stratas
- Stanley Thompson
- Down with Webster
- Peter Douris
- Jack McBain
- Gage Munroe
- Herbie Kuhn
- Kiefer Sutherland

== See also ==
- Education in Ontario
- List of secondary schools in Ontario
