= Mary Coombs =

British computer programmer (1929–2022)

- Born: Mary Clare Blood; 4 February 1929; Muswell Hill, London, England
- Died: 28 February 2022 (aged 93); Aylesbury, Buckinghamshire, England
- Education: Queen Mary University of London (BA)
- Known for: first female commercial computer programmer

Mary Clare Coombs (née Blood, 4 February 1929 – 28 February 2022) was a British computer programmer and schoolteacher. Employed in 1952 as the first female programmer to work on the LEO computers, she is recognised as the first female commercial programmer. The National Museum of Computing documents her contribution.

== Early life and education ==
Mary Clare Blood was born in Muswell Hill, London as the eldest daughter of Ruth (née Petri) and William Blood. She attended Putney High School and St Paul's Girls' School and earned a BA Honours degree in French, with History, from Queen Mary University of London. Her parents had met whilst working at the London Hospital, her mother in the appeals team, her father undertaking his medical training. Her father believed in women's education and her sister worked in microbiology and bacteriology. Unlike her sister, and unlike others in computing, she did not have a background in mathematics or science. After graduating, she moved to Surrey when her father became a medical officer for the catering company, J. Lyons and Co. having had to give up his GP practice due to ill health as a result of an injury sustained during World War I. He was clear that women should have their own careers and interests.

== Career at J. Lyons and Co. ==
After gaining her degree, Coombs spent a year teaching English in Lausanne, Switzerland. Returning home in 1952, she began work at J. Lyons and Co. as a temporary clerical worker, a job she reluctantly accepted while searching for a better alternative. Coombs' mathematical skills soon allowed her to transfer from the Ice Cream Sales department to the Statistical Office, where she heard that the division working on LEO computers had been looking to hire additional programmers.

The selection process, devised by Thomas Raymond Thompson, was conducted as a "computer appreciation course", which consisted of a gruelling week of daytime lectures and evening written assignments designed to test the candidates' aptitude for computer work. Of the 10 who took part in the original selection process, she was the only woman. Coombs' performance in the computer appreciation course was excellent, and as a result, she was one of just two candidates to be offered a job in the computer division, along with Frank Land. According to Coombs, she was one of a handful of women to take the computer appreciation course, and she was the only one to be offered a job as a result.

Once Coombs began officially working with LEO in 1952, she was taught how to program by John Grover, one of the first LEO programmers. Initially, she was the only woman on the team and worked alongside Leo Fantl, John Grover, and Derek Hemy, using LEO to automatically calculate payroll for employees at J. Lyons and Co. The team later did payroll work for the Ford Motor Company using LEO. Coombs also worked on programs for early LEO customers such as the Met Office, the British Army and the Inland Revenue. Coombs is recognised as the first woman to work on a commercial computer.

Coombs continued to work for J. Lyons and Co as the LEO II and LEO III were built. She spent most of her time as a supervisor, checking for logical and syntactical errors in the programs that other people wrote. She developed programs for internal company use and for outside clients as another portion of the business computing service offered by the firm. She was also in charge of rewriting programs from LEO II to work with LEO III, since LEO III used a different programming language.

J. Lyons and Co. provided a good work environment for Coombs. The company had sports clubs and an Amateur Dramatic Society in which Coombs was involved. However, the company provided very low pay.

== After J. Lyons and Co. ==
Coombs was transferred to English Electric Leo Computers in 1963, a company jointly created by the merger of J. Lyons and Co. and English Electric. In 1968, she was transferred to International Computers Limited (ICL) when they bought out English Electric Leo Computers. In 1964, because of family commitments, she moved from working full-time to part-time. She continued to work in the computing field, mainly editing manuals. She briefly taught a computer programming course at Princess Marina Centre at Seer Green for disabled residents.

In 1969, when she realised that she would not be able to work full-time, Coombs left the LEO team and briefly worked for Freelance Programmers, a company founded by Stephanie Shirley. After three years at home looking after her children, she returned to work, firstly as a primary school teacher in a private school and then – following a year working for a post-graduate Certificate in Education – about 10 years in primary schools in Buckinghamshire. In retirement, she taught piano, and ran the church choir.

== Personal life and death ==
On 26 March 1955, she married John Coombs, a co-worker at LEO. The couple had a daughter, Anne, who became disabled as a toddler and died at the age of six. They adopted three children, Andrew, Paul and Gillian. John Coombs predeceased her in 2012.

Coombs died from heart failure and COVID-19 at Stoke Mandeville Hospital in Aylesbury, Buckinghamshire, on 28 February 2022, at the age of 93. She was survived by her three children, three grandchildren, and her sister, Ruth.
