= Versailles Group =

Defunct British trade finance company

Versailles Group plc
- Type: Public company
- Traded as: Formerly LSE: VG
- Industry: Financial services
- Founded: 1990
- Founder: Carlton Cushnie
- Defunct: 2000
- Fate: Receivership after fraud
- Headquarters: London, United Kingdom
- Area served: United Kingdom
- Key people: Carlton Cushnie (CEO), Fred Clough (CFO)
- Products: Trade finance
- Number of employees: 60 (1999)

Versailles Group was a British trade finance company that was engaged in mezzanine lending and gap finance. In December 1999, trading in Versailles shares was suspended and in early 2000, the company was placed in administrative receivership after fraud by its leaders was discovered at the company.

Versailles was listed on Alternative Investment Market in September 1995 and transferred to the main London Stock Exchange in October 1997. The legal form of each of the company's transactions was that Versailles bought and sold goods and raw materials, the substance of the transactions was that Versailles financed its clients’ purchases of raw materials and subsequent sales of goods. The company was a FTSE-250 company based in London.

Versailles Group Ltd., the Boston-based M&A boutique firm, was never affiliated with the bankrupt Versailles Group plc. Versailles Group, Ltd. was founded by Mr. Donald Grava in January of 1987.

== History ==
Versailles Group plc was incorporated in 1990, providing trade finance primarily to businesses with poor credit history. The rates of interest charged were high: approximately 21% per annum with additional administration fees of 2.5% - 3.5% of the invoices’ value.

Versailles grew rapidly: revenue increased from £46.6 million in 1995 to £232.4 million in 1999; operating profit rose from £2.8 million to £15.3 million over the same period. The share price jumped from 7.5p on flotation in 1995 to £2.50 in September 1999, representing a £600m market capitalization and 140% CAGR in share appreciation.

In January 2000, the Serious Fraud Office investigated Versailles and its management following its financial collapse in which it owed its banks, led by Barclays and Royal Bank of Scotland, more than £70m. The investigation focused on a £100m discrepancy in Versailles's accounts, fictitious trades, forged documents, monies circulated to give the appearance of financial activity, and the alteration of computer records.

=== Fraud leading to collapse ===
Carlton Cushnie, Versailles's then chairman and chief executive, and Frederick Clough, the Finance Director, surrendered themselves to the Metropolitan Police Fraud Squad to face charges of Fraudulent Trading contrary to Section 458 of the Companies Act 1985. Frederick Clough's personal assistant, Lorraine Jones, was additionally charged with aiding and abetting, counselling and procuring Carlton Cushnie and Frederick Clough to commit Fraudulent Trading. An investigation revealed that phony transactions made up more than 80% of Versailles Group plc's turnover in each year from 1992 to the end of 1999 and that Cushnie had profited £29m by selling his shares in Versailles prior to its insolvency.
