= Academy of Robotics =

British autonomous robotics company

- Type: Private
- Industry: Robotics, Technology
- Founded: 2017
- Founder: William Sachiti
- Headquarters: United Kingdom
- Products: Robots; Robotics kits Driverless delivery vehicles
- Website: www.academyofrobotics.co.uk

Academy of Robotics is a UK-based artificial intelligence technology company that creates technology to automate repetitive tasks and logistics.

== History ==
The Academy of Robotics was founded by William Sachiti at Aberystwyth University in 2017, the university's InvEnterPrize program provided the startup with a £10 000 award as seed money to fund the company's first major project, the Kar-go project. The company then partnered with UK car manufacturer, Pilgrim Motorsports to build the first Kar-go vehicle.

That same year, the company raised its first funding round through the UK Financial Services Authority-approved platform Crowdcube to raise money for its Kar-go project.

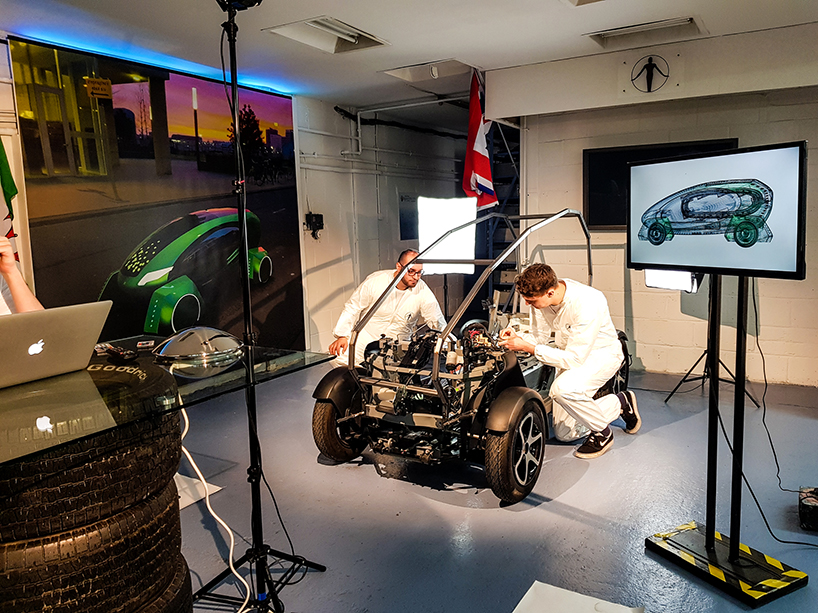
Kar-go Prototype Production in 2017

In July 2019, the company unveiled its first driverless delivery vehicle, Kar-go at Goodwood Festival of Speed in the UK and in November 2019, the company announced a partnership with Eurovia UK, part of the Vinci group. Eurovia announced its plans to test the Kar-go technology to automate the delivery of small plant equipment, tools, materials and other components to and from a highway work site as well as the potential use of data collected by Kar-go as it travels, to determine the condition of roads. The Kar-go Delivery Bot vehicle was then licensed to drive on the roads in the UK in 2020.

With funding from UK Research and Innovation for providing “No Human Contact Deliveries Via Semi-Autonomous Vehicles” the company began making its first deliveries on the roads in the UK, delivering medicines to vulnerable people in Hounslow.

The company invented Space-Bus, a mobile Command Station that is used to deploy and monitor autonomous vehicles using a proprietary Athena system. In November 2021, the company's mobile Command Station and Kar-go Delivery Bot were deployed in trials with the Royal Air Force at RAF Brize Norton.

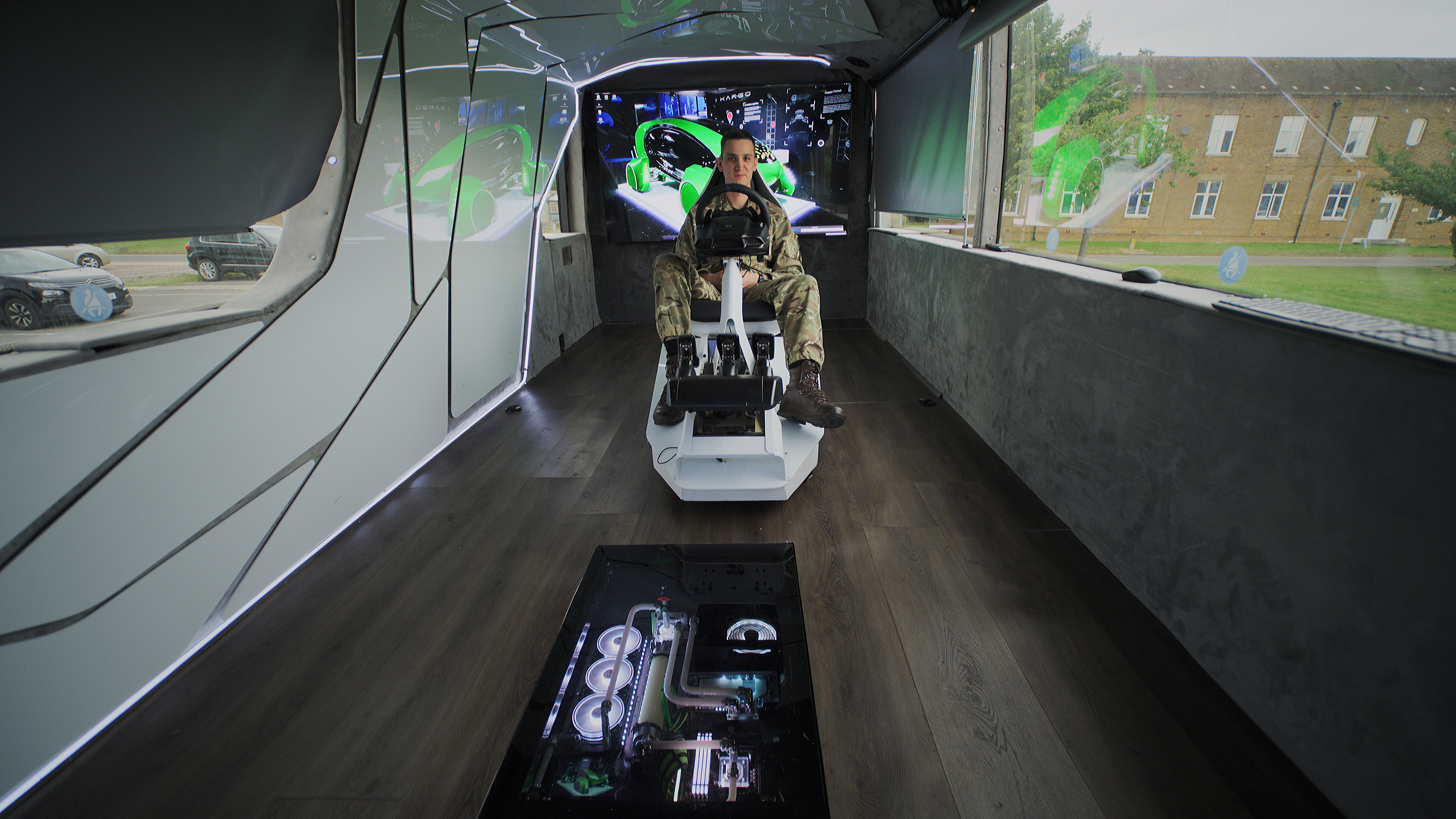
Flying Officer in the Control Chair of the Academy of Robotics Space-Bus Mobile Command Hub

In early 2022, the company's CEO, William Sachiti acquired the 26 acre former RAF radar base, RAF Neatishead and began renovating the site with the intention to lease parts of the site to his company, Academy of Robotics. The RAF Neatishead site includes a network of private test tracks, 2 hangars and an approximately 4 acre underground Cold War era nuclear bunker as well as a heritage listed Type 84 radar.

In June 2025 it was revealed that the MOD were taking them to court over their use of the land.

== Partnerships ==
In November 2019, Academy of Robotics and Eurovia UK (part of the Vinci Group) announced their partnership to test the Kar-go technology to automate the delivery of small plant equipment, tools, materials and other components to and from a highway work site as well as the potential use of data collected by Kar-go as it travels, to determine the condition of roads.

In September 2021, Academy of Robotics announced its trials with the Royal Air Force in the UK which saw its flagship Kar-go Delivery Bot vehicles and its Space-Bus mobile Command Station deployed to run errands to support the highly trained RAF personnel stationed on the UK’s largest air base, RAF Brize Norton.

In December 2022, the company announced its partnership with Milton Keynes University Hospital, NHS Foundation Trust and its first trials in the hospital with its new Helper Bot, Milton.
