= Johnny Smythe =

Sierra Leonean Royal Air Force officer and barrister (1915–1996)

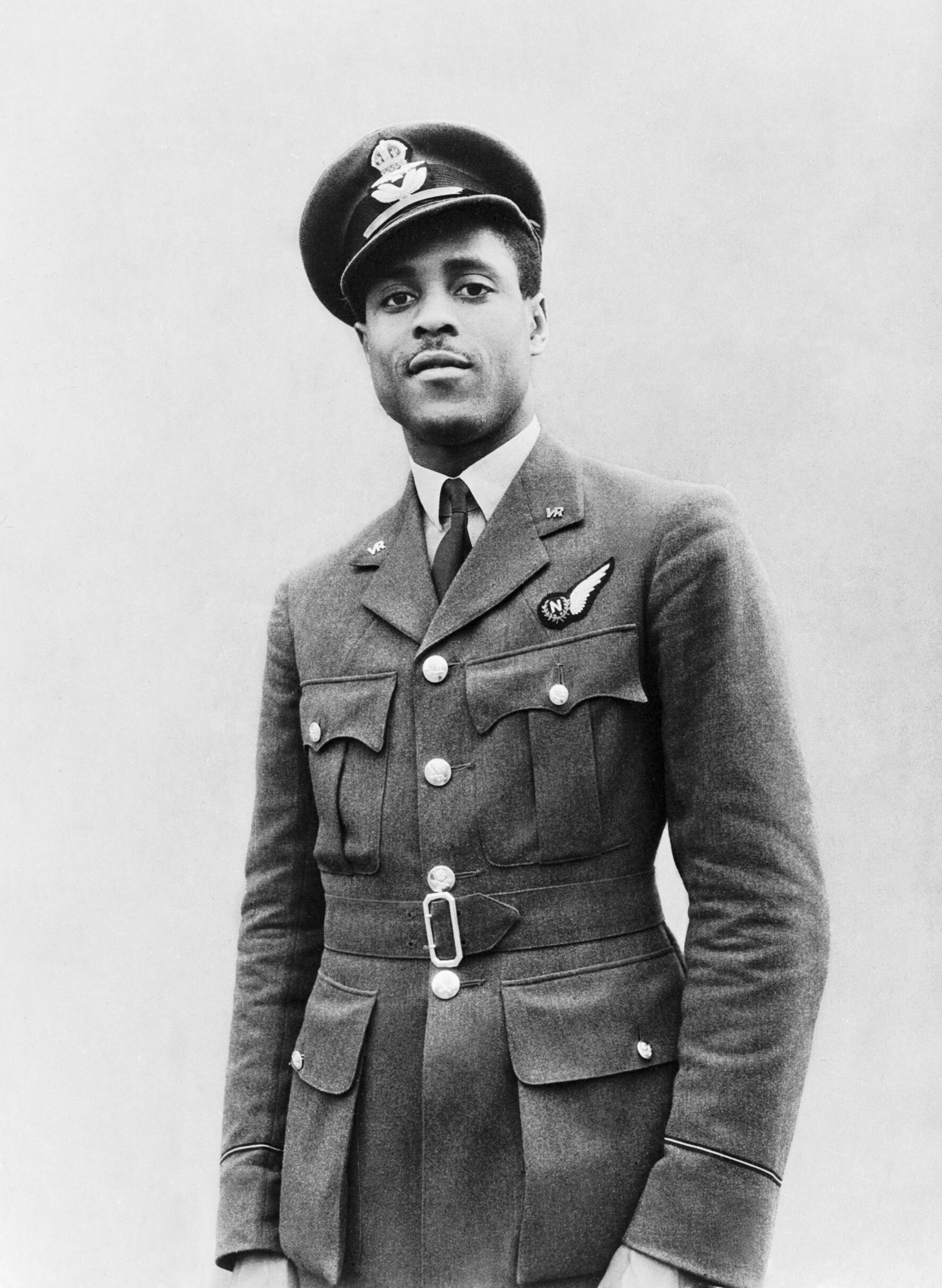
- Pilot Officer J H Smythe RAFVR of Sierra Leone, photographed while undergoing training at No. 11 Operational Training Unit, RAF Westcott, Buckinghamshire
- Born: 1915; Freetown, Sierra Leone Colony and Protectorate
- Died: 1996 (aged 80–81); Thame, Oxfordshire, England, United Kingdom
- Burial place: St Mary's Church, Thame
- Spouse: Violet Wells Bain
- Relatives: Donald Smythe, Jennifer Smythe, John Smythe, Eddy Smythe, Kathryn Smythe
- Military career
- Allegiance: British Empire
- Branch: Royal Air Force
- Service years: 1939–1951
- Rank: Flight Lieutenant
- Nickname: Johnny
- Service number: 144608
- Unit: 623 Squadron
- Conflicts: World War II • Western Front
- Awards: Member of the Order of the British Empire (MBE), Order of the British Empire, Queens Councel, Member of the Republic of Sierre Leone, Order of St Lazarus
- Other work: Barrister, Attorney General of Sierra Leone

John Henry Clavell Smythe, QC, MBE (1915–1996) was a Sierra Leonean Royal Air Force officer during World War II and barrister. He was born a Sierra Leone Creole into the British Empire and served as a navigation officer in the Royal Air Force. He was shot down over Nazi Germany and spent two years as a prisoner of war. After liberation and return to Britain, he was a role model to those in the beginning of the Windrush Generation. He retrained as a lawyer, returned to his birthplace, and served as Attorney General of Sierra Leone.

== Early life and family background ==
Smythe was born in 1915 in Freetown, Sierra Leone to a Creole family, a grandson of John H. Smythe, American ambassador to Liberia. Smythe attended the Sierra Leone Grammar School and subsequently worked as a clerk for Freetown City Council.

== Military service ==
On the outbreak of World War II, Smythe joined a local defence force, becoming a Sergeant.

Smythe was one of the few West Africans to serve in the Royal Air Force during the Second World War. On 14 May 1943, he received an emergency commission as a pilot officer in the Royal Air Force Volunteer Reserve (RAFVR), and was promoted war-substantive flying officer six months later. He was transferred to No. 623 Squadron RAF which flew the outdated Short Stirling. On his 27th flight and 5th operation on 18 November 1943, he was shot down, wounded and captured and spent 18 months as a prisoner of war in Stalag Luft I camp in Barth, eastern Germany.

On 14 May 1945, a week after the war ended, Smythe was promoted war-substantive flight lieutenant in the RAFVR, receiving a regular commission as a flight lieutenant in the RAF on 9 May 1947 (seniority from 14 November 1947).

After the war, Smythe was seconded to the Colonial Office, with responsibility for the welfare of demobilised RAF personnel from Africa and the Caribbean. In 1948 he became the senior Colonial Office official on the Empire Windrush, a captured German troop ship taking former military personnel back to their homes in the Caribbean. On discovering that it would be very hard for the men to find jobs in Jamaica, Smythe consulted the Colonial Office, which agreed that the men should return to Britain. West Indians who settled in Britain from that point became known as the Windrush generation. For his services, Smythe was appointed a Member of the Order of the British Empire, Military Division (MBE) in the 1951 Birthday Honours. He ended his active service in the RAF in June 1951, transferring to the reserves.

== Later career ==
After Smythe twice successfully defended men facing courts martial, despite having no legal training, a judge suggested that he take up a career in law and provided a letter of introduction. He qualified as a barrister and returned to Freetown, Sierra Leone's capital and initially worked for the government, becoming a Queens Counsel and serving as Attorney General.

On an official visit to the United States, Smythe was invited to the White House by President John F. Kennedy. Both Smythe and Kennedy had back pain because of injuries sustained during the Second World War, and Kennedy recommended that Smythe consult his own chiropractor.

At a social occasion in Freetown, Smythe was talking to the German Ambassador. In the course of conversation, the ambassador revealed that he had been a fighter pilot who shot down his first British bomber on the date and in the place where Smythe had been shot down.

== Legacy ==
Smythe's achievements and contributions have been widely recognized in different world war records. In 2022, there was a docudrama made in honour of him in a film entitled Flying For Britain in partnership with the Royal Air Force Museum and National Heritage Fund. Actor Ricardo P. Lloyd portrays him in the film and his son Eddy Smythe provides the narration.

In 2024, Helena Bonham Carter's BBC Radio 4 documentary podcast History's Secret Heroes dedicated a full episode to Smythe's efforts during the Second World War.
