= T. H. Tse =

Hong Kong academic, professor and researcher

T. H. Tse MBE
- Occupation: Honorary Professor

Academic background
- Education: London School of Economics
- Doctoral advisor: Frank Land; Ian Angell

Academic work
- Discipline: Software Engineering
- Institutions: The University of Hong Kong
- Website: cs.hku.hk/~tse

T. H. Tse (Chinese: 謝俊謙) is a Hong Kong academic who is a professor and researcher in program testing and debugging. He ranks internationally as the second most prolific author on metamorphic testing. According to Bruel et al., "Research on integrated formal and informal techniques can trace its roots to the work of T.H. Tse in the mid-eighties." The application areas of his research include object-oriented software, services computing, pervasive computing, concurrent systems, imaging software, and numerical programs. In addition, he creates graphic designs for non-government organizations.

Tse received the PhD from the London School of Economics in 1988 under the supervision of Frank Land and Ian Angell. He was a Visiting Fellow at the University of Oxford in 1990 and 1992. He is currently an honorary professor in computer science at the University of Hong Kong after retiring from his full professorship in 2014. He was decorated with an MBE by Queen Elizabeth II of the United Kingdom.

In 2013, an international event entitled "The Symposium on Engineering Test Harness" was held in Nanjing, China "in honor of the retirement of T.H. Tse". The acronym of the symposium was "TSE-TH".

In 2017 to 2021, Tse served as the intermediary for the fundraising of $150 million for the University of Hong Kong to establish the Tam Wing Fan Innovation Wings I and II in the Faculty of Engineering.

In 2019, Tse and team applied metamorphic testing to verify the robustness of citation indexing services, including Scopus and Web of Science. The innovative method, known as "metamorphic robustness testing", revealed that the presence of simple hyphens in the titles of scholarly papers adversely affects citation counts and journal impact factors, regardless of the quality of the publications. This "bizarre new finding", as well as the refutation by Web of Science and the clarification by Tse, was reported in ScienceAlert, Nature Index, Communications of the ACM, Psychology Today, and The Australian. It ranks within "the top 5% of all research outputs scored by Altmetric".

In 2021, Tse and team were selected as the Grand Champion of the Most Influential Paper Award by the Journal of Systems and Software for their 2010 paper. According to Google Scholar, the journal ranks no. 3 in h5-index among international publication venues in software systems.

In July 2024, Tse was Selected as Featured Reviewer of the Month by ACM Computing Reviews.

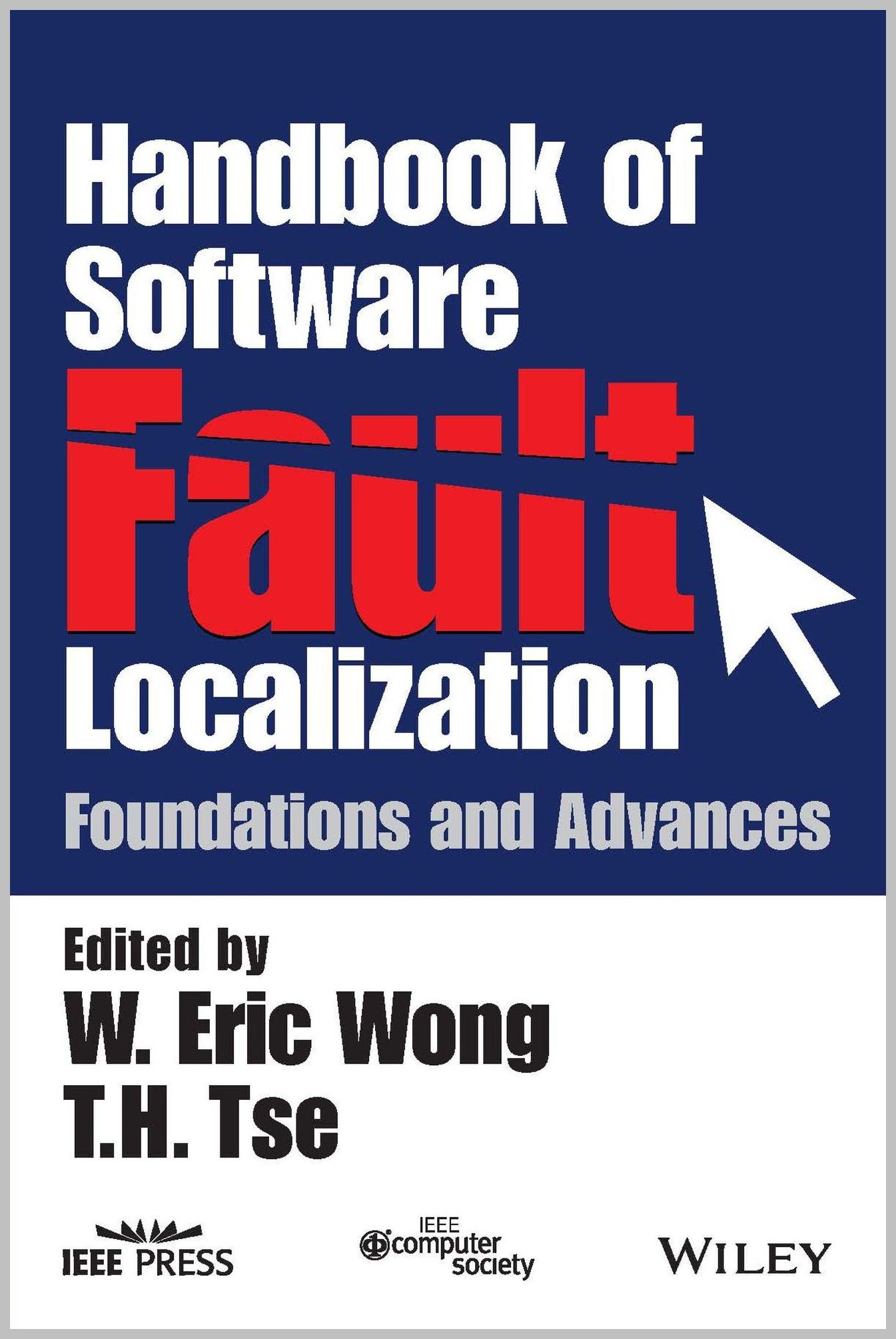
Handbook of Software Fault Localization: Foundations and Advances, Wiley-IEEE Press (2023). Credit: Cover Design by T.H. Tse.

== Books ==
- W. Eric Wong; T.H. Tse, eds. (2023). Handbook of Software Fault Localization: Foundations and Advances. Hoboken, NJ, US: Wiley-IEEE Press. ISBN 978-1-119-29180-0.
- T.H. Tse (Ebook 2010; Paperback 2009; Hardcover 1991). A Unifying Framework for Structured Analysis and Design Models: An Approach using Initial Algebra Semantics and Category Theory. Joseph Goguen (ed.), Cambridge Tracts in Theoretical Computer Science. Vol. 11. Cambridge, UK: Cambridge University Press. ISBN 978-0-5213-9196-2.

== Selected publications ==
- Tsong Yueh Chen; Tse, T.H. (2021). New visions on metamorphic testing after a quarter of a century of inception. Ideas, Visions and Reflections Track, Proceedings of the ACM Joint European Software Engineering Conference and Symposium on Foundations of Software Engineering (ESEC/FSE '21). ACM, New York, NY, USA. pp. 1487–1490. doi:10.1145/3468264.3473136.
- Zhi Quan Zhou; Tse, T.H.; Matt Witheridge (2021). "Metamorphic robustness testing: Exposing hidden defects in citation statistics and journal impact factors". IEEE Transactions on Software Engineering. 47 (6): 1164–1183. doi:10.1109/TSE.2019.2915065.
- Tsong Yueh Chen; Kuo, Fei-Ching; Liu, Huai; Poon, Pak-Lok; Towey, Dave; Tse, T.H.; Zhi Quan Zhou (2018). "Metamorphic testing: A review of challenges and opportunities". ACM Computing Surveys. 51 (1): 4:1–4:27. hdl:10722/254895.
- Huo Yan Chen; Tse, T.H. (2013). "Equality to equals and unequals: A revisit of the equivalence and nonequivalence criteria in class-level testing of object-oriented software". IEEE Transactions on Software Engineering. 39 (11): 1549–1563. doi:10.1109/TSE.2013.33. hdl:10722/187124. S2CID 8694513.
- Tsong Yueh Chen; Tse, T.H.; Zhi Quan Zhou (2010). "Semi-proving: An integrated method for program proving, testing, and debugging". IEEE Transactions on Software Engineering. 37 (1): 109–125. doi:10.1109/TSE.2010.23. hdl:1959.3/84879.
- Tsong Yueh Chen; Kuo, Fei-Ching; Merkel, Robert G.; Tse, T.H. (2010). "Adaptive random testing: The ART of test case diversity". Journal of Systems and Software. 83 (1): 60–66. doi:10.1016/j.jss.2009.02.022. hdl:10722/89054.
