= Keith Doig =

Australian rules footballer

Personal information
- Full name: Keith McKeddie Doig
- Born: 18 December 1891; Nathalia, Victoria
- Died: 3 January 1949 (aged 57); Lorne
- Original team: Geelong College

Playing career^{1}
Years	Club	Games (Goals)
1912–1914	University	44 (15)
- ^{1} Playing statistics correct to the end of 1914.

Keith McKeddie Doig MC (18 December 1891 – 3 January 1949) was an Australian rules footballer who played with University in the Victorian Football League (VFL).

== Family ==
The third of the four children of Mitchell Michael Doig (1858–1895), and Henrietta Eliza Doig (1853–1924), née McKeddie, Keith McKeddie Doig was born at Nathalia, Victoria on 18 December 1891.

He married Lewis Maffra "Louie" Grant (1888–1976), the sister of Kerr Grant, at the College Church, Parkville on 31 March 1920. They had four children: Ronald Keith Doig (1921-2006) and William Grant Doig (1922-2011), both of whom also practised of medicine; Jean Grant Doig (1924-2012), later Mrs. George Clifford Gaze, a biochemist; and Alison Grant Doig (1929-), later Mrs. Richard Harcourt, a mathematician.

== Education ==
His school education was at Geelong College, where he was dux of the school and captain of both cricket and football. From there he went to Ormond College at the University of Melbourne and it was a mark of respect for him as a schoolboy that his fees at Ormond were paid by the headmaster of Geelong College.

At University he excelled in both sport and academic life. He captained his cricket and football teams from his second year on and was made a University blue for both sports. He made 44 appearances for University over the period 1912–1914.

After his year of residency at the Royal Melbourne Hospital he entered the Australian Army Medical Corps in 1916 and spent his time in France. He was awarded the Military Cross in the 1918 New Year Honours.

== Medical Practice ==
On returning to civilian life he set up medical practice in Colac in 1920 and married the same year. It was a stimulating practice and he gave it all his vital energy and ability. He continued to be keen on sport, this time in tennis, and he was captain of the winning country week tennis team in 1933.

== Death ==
During World War II, the shortage of medical men in the country areas took toll on his health. He suffered his first heart attack in 1948 and his second fatal one in 1949.
