= Alison Harcourt =

Australian mathematician

Alison Harcourt AO
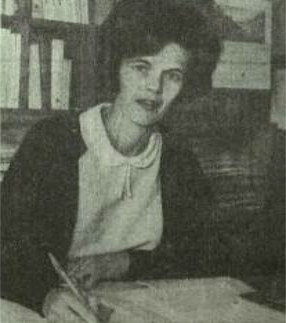
- Alison Doig in 1965
- Born: Alison Grant Doig; 24 November 1929 (age 96); Colac, Victoria, Australia
- Education: University of Melbourne
- Known for: Branch and bound algorithm
- Spouse: Richard Harcourt
- Scientific career
- Fields: Statistics, linear programming
- Workplaces: London School of Economics; University of Melbourne

Alison Grant Harcourt AO (née Doig; born 24 November 1929) is an Australian mathematician and statistician most well-known for co-defining the branch and bound algorithm along with Ailsa Land whilst carrying out research at the London School of Economics. She was also part of the team which developed a poverty line as part of the Henderson Inquiry into poverty in Australia and helped to introduce the double randomisation method of ordering candidates used in Australian elections.

== Early life and education ==
Harcourt was born Alison Doig in Colac, Victoria, in 1929. Her father was Keith Doig, a physician and Australian rules footballer who received the Military Cross during World War I. Her mother, Louie Grant, was of Scottish descent and was sister to physicist Sir Kerr Grant.

She was schooled at Colac West State School, Colac High School and Fintona Girls' School. After her schooling, she enrolled at the University of Melbourne, gaining a Bachelor of Arts with a major in mathematics, and then a Bachelor of Science majoring in physics. While specialising in statistics undertaking a Master of Arts degree, she developed a technique for integer linear programming.

== London School of Economics ==
On the basis of her work in linear programming, she started work at the London School of Economics (LSE) in the late 1950s. In 1960, Doig and fellow LSE mathematician Ailsa Land, published a landmark paper in the economics journal Econometrica ("An Automatic Method for Solving Discrete Programming Problems"), which outlined a branch and bound optimisation algorithm for solving NP-hard problems. The algorithm is the backbone idea behind all modern Integer programming solvers such as Gurobi, Cplex.

== University of Melbourne ==
In 1963, Doig returned to Melbourne, where she took up a position as a senior lecturer in statistics at the University of Melbourne.

In the mid-1960s, she joined a team headed by the sociologist Ronald Henderson which was attempting to quantify the extent of poverty in Australia. The team developed the Henderson Poverty Line in 1973, which was the disposable income required to support the basic needs of a family of two adults and two dependent children. The techniques developed by the Henderson team have been used by the Melbourne Institute of Applied Economic and Social Research to regularly update the poverty line for Australia since 1979.

In 1970, Harcourt took study leave in Sweden, where she co-authored two papers on theoretical chemistry—"A simple demonstration of Hund’s Rule for the helium 2S and 2P States" and "Wavefunctions for 4-electron 3-centre bonding"—with her husband, the chemist Richard Harcourt.

In 1975, following the dismissal of the Whitlam government, Harcourt and fellow statistician Malcolm Clark noticed irregularities in the distribution of party ordering on the Senate ballot papers for the 1975 federal election which was determined by drawing envelopes from a box, with Coalition parties holding one of the first two positions in every state. Harcourt and Clark made a submission to the Joint Select Committee on Electoral Reform, which resulted in a 1984 amendment to the Commonwealth Electoral Act to introduce a more rigorous double randomisation method. Harcourt and Clark published a paper about their analysis and recommendations for the Australian & New Zealand Journal of Statistics in 1991.

Harcourt retired as an academic from the University of Melbourne in 1994, but continued to work there as a sessional tutor in statistics. She finally retired completely aged 90 in 2019. She pointed out in an interview that she had "tutored or lectured in every decade from the 1940s to the 2010s".

In October 2018 Harcourt was named as 2019 Senior Victorian Australian of the Year. In early December 2018, the University of Melbourne awarded Harcourt with an honorary Doctor of Science degree.

In June 2019, Harcourt was made an Officer of the Order of Australia in recognition of her "distinguished service to mathematics and computer science through pioneering research and development of integer linear programming".
