= Frank Land =

British information systems researcher (1928–2026)

Frank Land OBE FBCS
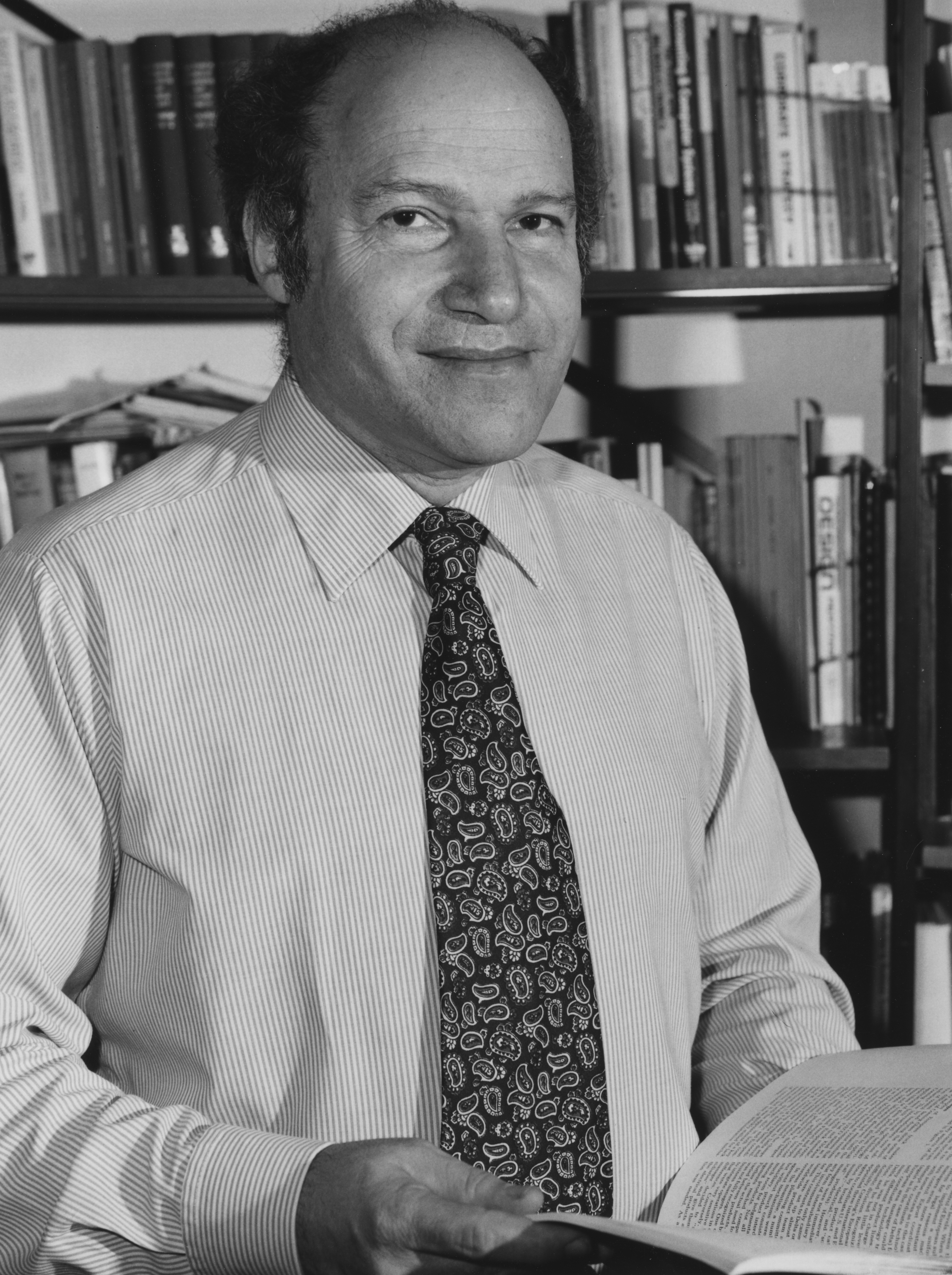
- Land in 1982
- Born: Frank Landsberger; 24 October 1928; Berlin, Brandenburg, Prussia, Germany
- Died: 16 May 2026 (aged 97); United Kingdom
- Known for: British Computer Society; National Computing Centre; International Federation for Information Processing
- Spouse: Ailsa Land
- Awards: FBCS; Association for Information Systems's LEO Award

Academic work
- Discipline: Information Systems
- Institutions: London School of Economics; London Business School; Wharton School; Sydney University; Bond University; Curtin University; Indian Institute of Management Ahmedabad
- Doctoral students: Robert D. Galliers; T.H. Tse

Fred Frank Land (born Frank Landsberger; 24 October 1928 – 16 May 2026) was a German-born information systems researcher who was the first Professor of Information Systems in the United Kingdom. He was latterly an emeritus professor in the Department of Information Systems at the London School of Economics (LSE). Land was married to Ailsa Land, a professor of operations research.

== Early life and career ==
Land was born in Berlin on 24 October 1928 as an identical twin. He and his brother Ralph were born into a well-off Jewish family, who fled to the UK in 1939 in the aftermath of Kristallnacht. He and his brother changed their name from Landsberger to Land on the advice of a careers advisor at the LSE. Land was educated at Willesden County Grammar School from 1943 to 1947 and after graduating in Economics from the LSE in 1950, he joined the London food and catering enterprise J. Lyons, working on the first electronic computer designed for business use, the LEO I with his colleague Mary Coombs.

In 1967, Land was selected for a newly established post in what later became the Department of Information Systems at LSE. Here he became involved with the development and definition of the subject and its curriculum. He chaired working parties for the British Computer Society, the National Computing Centre, and the Council for National Academic Awards concerned with curriculum development. He worked with an international group to establish the International Federation for Information Processing's (IFIP) curriculum for information systems designers. At the LSE, he set up the ADMIS (Analysis, Design and Management of Information Systems) Master's course and developed a Ph.D. program.

In 1982, Land was appointed the UK's first professor of information systems. In 1986, he moved to the London Business School as professor of information management. He has served as visiting professor at the University of Pennsylvania (the Wharton School), Sydney University, Bond University, Curtin University, and the Indian Institute of Management Ahmedabad (IIMA).

He was awarded an honorary doctorate in science and the IFIP award for distinguished service. He has served as technical advisor to House of Commons Select committees examining IT in the UK. He was a Fellow of the British Computer Society.

Land retired from full-time academic work in 1992 and was Visiting Professor of Information Management at the LSE and at Leeds Metropolitan University.

In 2003, Land was jointly selected for the AIS LEO Award with Jack F. Rockart of the Massachusetts Institute of Technology, for lifetime exceptional achievement. The LEO Award, established in 1999 by the Association for Information Systems and the International Conference on Information Systems, recognises seminal contributions to research, theory development, and practice in Information Systems.

Land was appointed Officer of the Order of the British Empire (OBE) in the 2019 Birthday Honours for services to the information systems industry.

== Personal life and death ==
His wife was the LSE operational research emeritus professor Ailsa Land (1927–2021). They married in 1953 and had three children, Frances, Richard, and Margi, during Ailsa's PhD studies. Following their retirement, the couple moved to Devon in 2000.

Land died from an infection on 16 May 2026, aged 97.

== Selected publications ==
=== Books ===
- Farbey, Barbara, Frank Land, and David Targett. How to assess your IT investment: a study of methods and practice. Oxford: Butterworth-Heinemann, 1993.
- Avgerou, Chrisanthi, Claudio Ciborra, and Frank Land, eds. The social study of information and communication technology: Innovation, actors, and contexts. Oxford: Oxford University Press, 2004.

=== Articles ===
- Land, Frank, and Rudy Hirschheim. "Participative systems design: rationale, tools and techniques." Journal of Applied Systems Analysis 10.10 (1983): 15–18.
- Galliers, Robert D., and Frank F. Land. "Viewpoint: choosing appropriate information systems research methodologies." Communications of the ACM 30.11 (1987): 901–902.
- Farbey, Barbara, Frank Land, and David Targett. "Evaluating investments in IT." Journal of information technology 7.2 (1992): 109–122.
- Farbey, Barbara, Frank Land, and David Targett. "A taxonomy of information systems applications: The benefits ladder." European journal of information systems 4.1 (1995): 41–50.
- Farbey, Barbara, Frank Land, and David Targett. "Moving IS evaluation forward: learning themes and research issues." The Journal of Strategic Information Systems 8.2 (1999): 189–207.
