= Capital City Academy =

Harris Lowe Academy Willesden
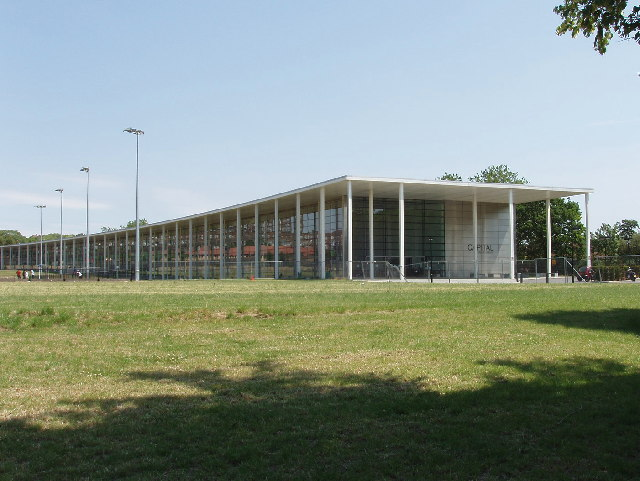

Location
- Doyle Gardens; Willesden, Brent, Greater London, NW10 3ST; England

Information
- Type: Academy
- Established: 2003
- Local authority: Brent
- Trust: Harris Federation
- Department for Education URN: 134226 Tables
- Ofsted: Reports
- Principal: Joshua Deery
- Gender: Mixed
- Age: 11 to 18
- Enrolment: 1112
- Website: https://www.harrislowewillesden.org.uk/

Harris Lowe Academy Willesden is a specialist sports and arts Academy in Willesden, North West London, in the London Borough of Brent. Prior to 2023 it was known as Capital City Academy.

== Design ==
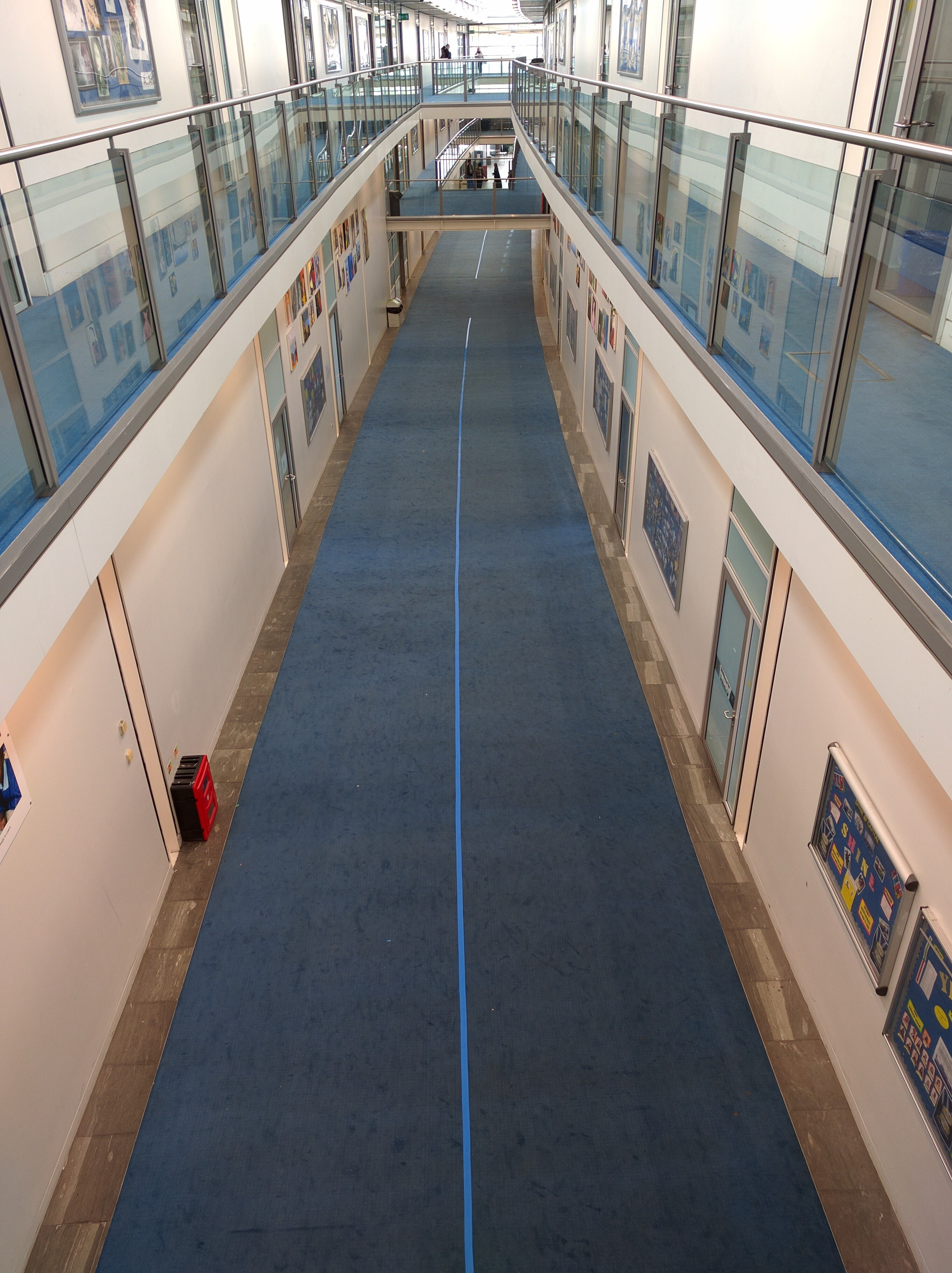
Inside the Building

The school was designed by architect Sir Norman Foster and engineers Buro Happold, and is sponsored by Sir Frank Lowe. Capital City Academy was built to replace its predecessor Willesden High School. Its buildings on the high school's playing fields were first used in 2003 and officially opened on 12 June 2003.

== Location ==
It is situated near Willesden Sports Stadium and King Edward VII Sports Ground. Although near Willesden Green, the school is in the parish of All Souls, Willesden. The school is located not far from Roundwood Park.

== History ==
=== Grammar school ===
The school began as Willesden County School, on Uffington Road (off Doyle Gardens) in 1924 and the buildings were extended in 1932.

=== Second World War ===
The boys and Kilburn Grammar School were evacuated to Northampton School for Boys, then a grammar school. The girls were evacuated to Northampton High School, England.

In September 1940, a bomb destroyed four classrooms; a V-1 flying bomb landed nearby in 1944 at the junction of Doyle Gardens and All Souls Avenue.

=== Post war ===
Following the Education Act 1944, it became Willesden County Grammar School in 1947; one of five grammar schools run by the Willesden Education Committee. For one year in 1966 it became Willesden Grammar-Technical School when it amalgamated with Willesden School of Engineering in Goodson Road earlier known as Leopold Road Comprehensive.

=== Comprehensive ===
In September 1967, it joined with Pound Lane School on Pound Lane to become a comprehensive school known as Willesden High School. In 2003, it became one of the first three academies in England, with the aim of attempting to overcome educational underachievement in deprived areas. At the time, Willesden High School had some of the worst GCSE results in the UK.

Former UK prime minister Tony Blair opened the Academy. Frank McCourt the Pulitzer Prize-winning author of Angela's Ashes visited and signed copies of his books for the Gifted education group of students, reviewing the Carnegie Medal and Kate Greenaway Medal nominations of the year.

In 2004, journalists Polly Toynbee and David Walker went with some of the school's pupils on a visit to the University of Oxford. Toynbee and Walker wrote about this in their book Unjust Rewards (2008). They describe the difficulties that many pupils of the school would have getting to university because of growing up in poverty.

== HLAW in the media ==
=== The Children ===
The Children was a TV miniseries aired on ITV in September 2008. The main character was a headteacher played by Inspector Morse actor, Kevin Whately. The scenes set at his school were filmed in the academy, with actual students as extras.

=== Teachers TV ===
The Academy was filmed for Teachers TV a number of times, most notably in its first two years, where it goes into depth about the school on the original site of the Academy, Willesden High School.

== Sports Hall ==
The Academy's main sports hall is home to the PAWS London Capital basketball team, one of the leading clubs based in the capital city. Having recently featured in the British Basketball League for three years, the Caps currently compete in Division 1 of the English Basketball League.

== Alumni ==
=== Capital City Academy ===
- Ricardo P. Lloyd, British actor

=== Wilesden High School ===
- Dave Beasant, goalkeeper
- Luther Blissett, striker with Watford
- Phillip DeFreitas, cricketer, fast bowler for England
- Shane Richie, Alfie Moon in EastEnders, former husband of Coleen Nolan
- Eugene Ankomah, artist

=== Willesden County Grammar School ===
- Gerry Anderson, animator and creator of Thunderbirds (TV series)
- Roy Battersby, television director
- Les Buck, general secretary from 1962 to 1977 of the National Union of Sheet Metal Workers, Coppersmiths, Heating and Domestic Engineers
- Stuart Carne CBE, GP
- Carl Cushnie, first black entrepreneur to enter Britain's richest 500 people (number 312) in 1998, becoming Britain's richest black businessman, sentenced for six years for fraud.
- Liz Gebhardt, actress
- Ron Goodwin (briefly), composer of soundtracks such as Those Magnificent Men in their Flying Machines and 633 Squadron
- Norman Hudis, screenwriter who wrote the first six Carry On films, and established the franchise
- Alan Isler novelist, caned by the headmaster, Dr Roberts, for stealing gooseberries from the Victory Garden
- Frank Land, early computer scientist
- Gary Locke (English footballer), full back for Chelsea
- John Neville CM OBE, actor who starred in Terry Gilliam's The Adventures of Baron Munchausen
- Molly Parkin, fashion writer and novelist
- Prof Graham Warren FRS, professor of cell biology from 1999 to 2007 at Yale School of Medicine, and principal scientist from 1989 to 1999 of the Imperial Cancer Research Fund

=== Former teachers ===
- Max Morris, headteacher from 1966 to 1978 of Willesden High School and president of the NUT from 1973 to 1974
