= William Sachiti =

Zimbabwean-born British entrepreneur and inventor

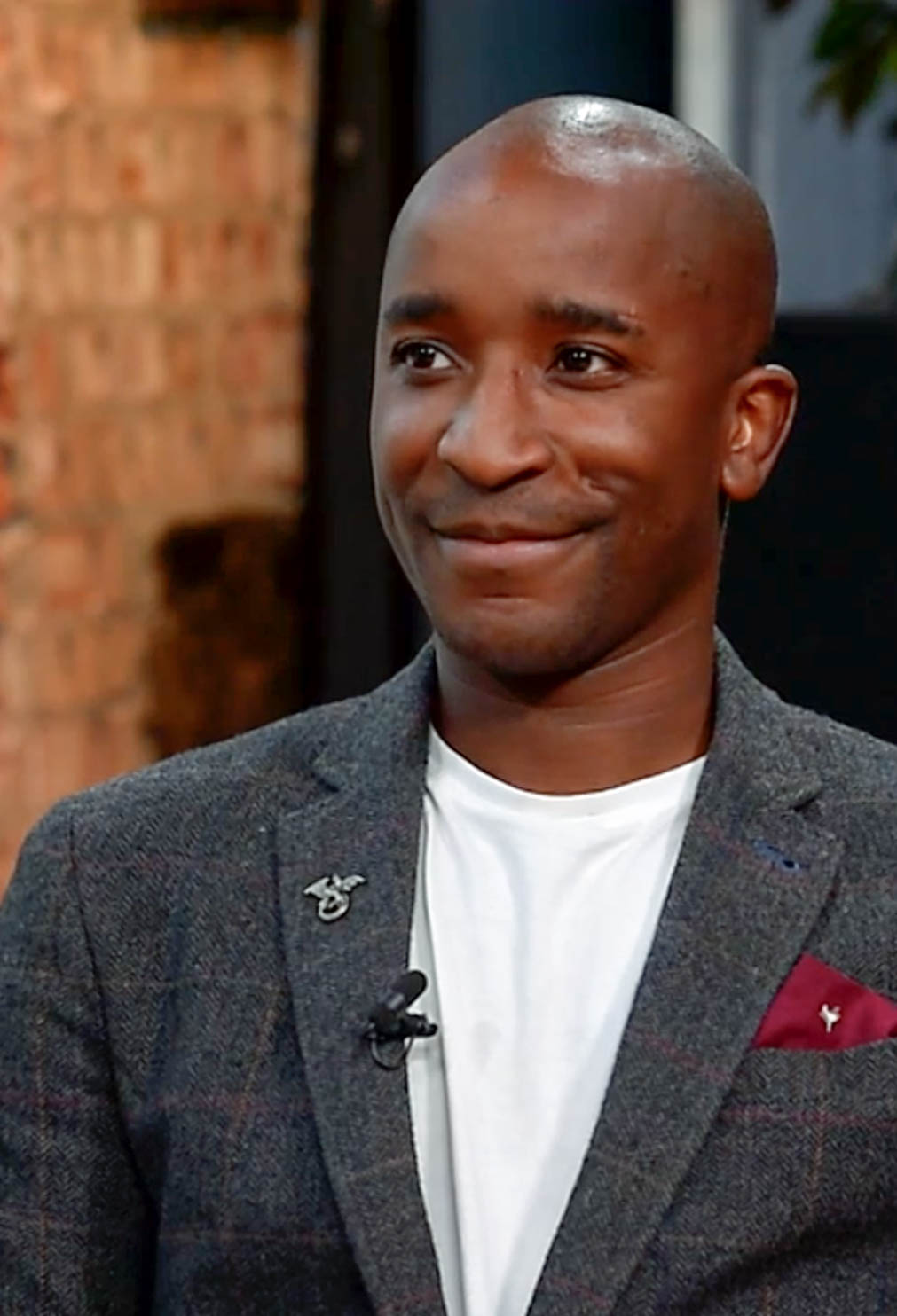
- Sachiti on London Live 2017
- Born: May 1984 (age 42); Harare, Zimbabwe
- Education: Artificial Intelligence & Robotics
- Occupations: Entrepreneur, Inventor
- Known for: Dragons' Den, Kar-go, mycityvenue, Academy of Robotics

Pasi William Sachiti (born May 1984) is a Zimbabwean-born British entrepreneur and inventor. Sachiti is the founder and CEO of Academy of Robotics, an autonomous technology company which is primarily known for developing street-legal self-driving vehicles and solutions for road maintenance.

== Career ==
=== Early ventures ===
William Sachiti appeared on the BBC investment programme Dragons' Den in 2009 seeking investment for his company - Clever Bins. Clever Bins manufactured solar-powered digital advertising bins intended for public spaces. The Dragons did not invest in the business (with Dragon Peter Jones describing Sachiti's pitch as "infuriating and complete rubbish", and "the biggest load of bull I've ever heard in the Den"), but the business continued trading and secured a partnership with Keep Britain Tidy and trials with local councils in Manchester and London.

In 2011 Sachiti (along with co-founder Ronald Ndoro) went on to develop a digital concierge service known as mycityvenue, which operated for a short time before being acquired by SecretEscapes in 2014.

While studying at Aberystwyth University, Sachiti and another student (Ariel Ladegaard) developed a prototype robot for navigating users around the main library at the university. Sachiti left the university before graduating, but still won an entrepreneurship prize along with Laadegard and another student - Aparajit Narayan. The trio were awarded £10,000 in prize money by the university’s entrepreneurship program for developing a theoretical solution to the last-mile delivery problem called Car-go (later renamed to Kar-go).

Sachiti later founded a company to build on these early projects - Academy of Robotics. The Kar-go vehicle was developed further in collaboration with Pilgrim Motorsports, before finally being revealed in July 2019 at the Goodwood Festival of Speed.

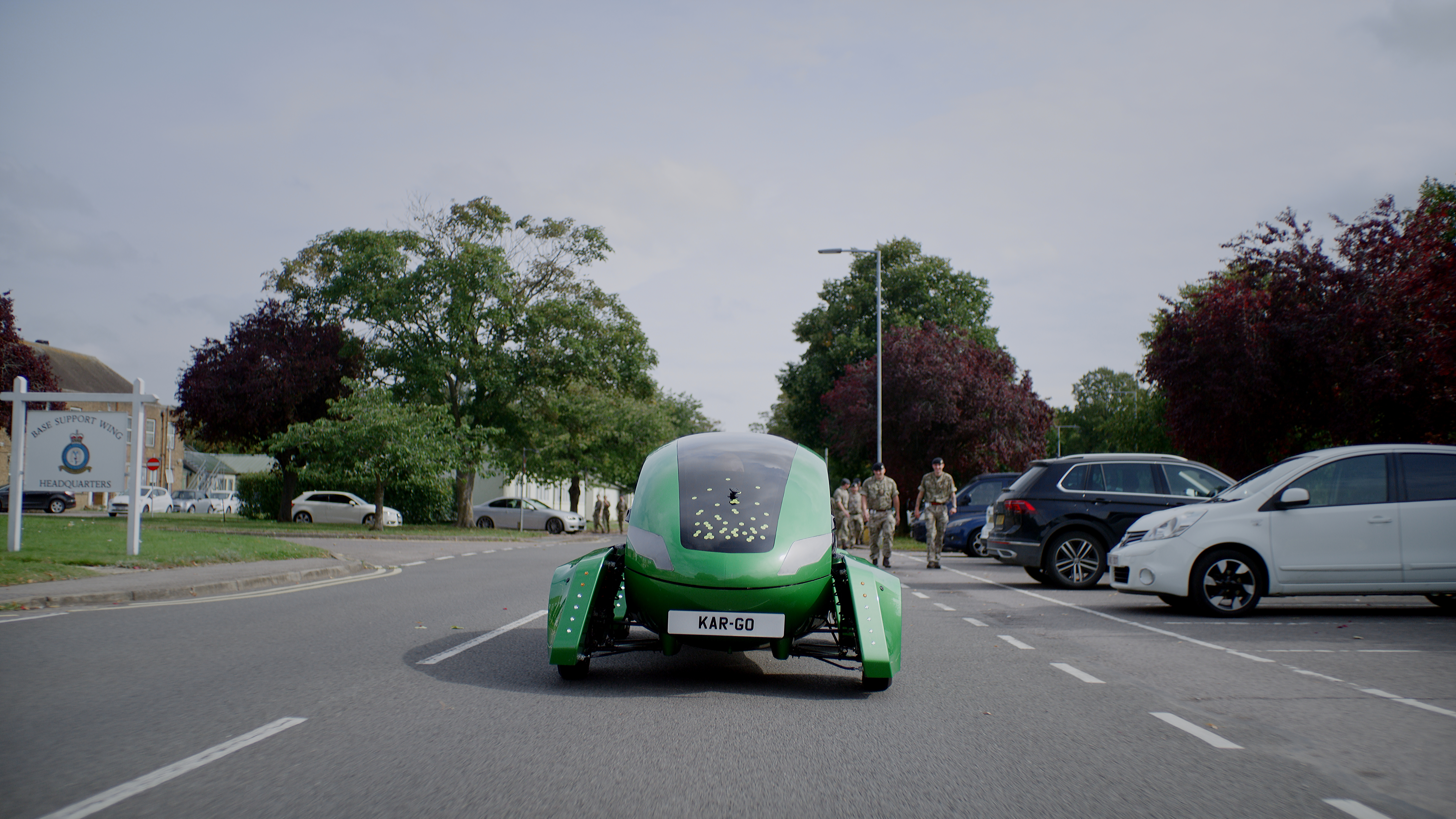
The Kar-go autonomous delivery vehicle driving through RAF Brize Norton air base during trials in 2021

In early 2022, William Sachiti’s company Academy of Robotics purchased a former RAF base (RAF Neatishead) and moved onto the site in Norfolk.

in June 2025 it was revealed that the MOD were taking them to court over their use of the land.
