= Ailsa Land =

British mathematician (1927–2021)

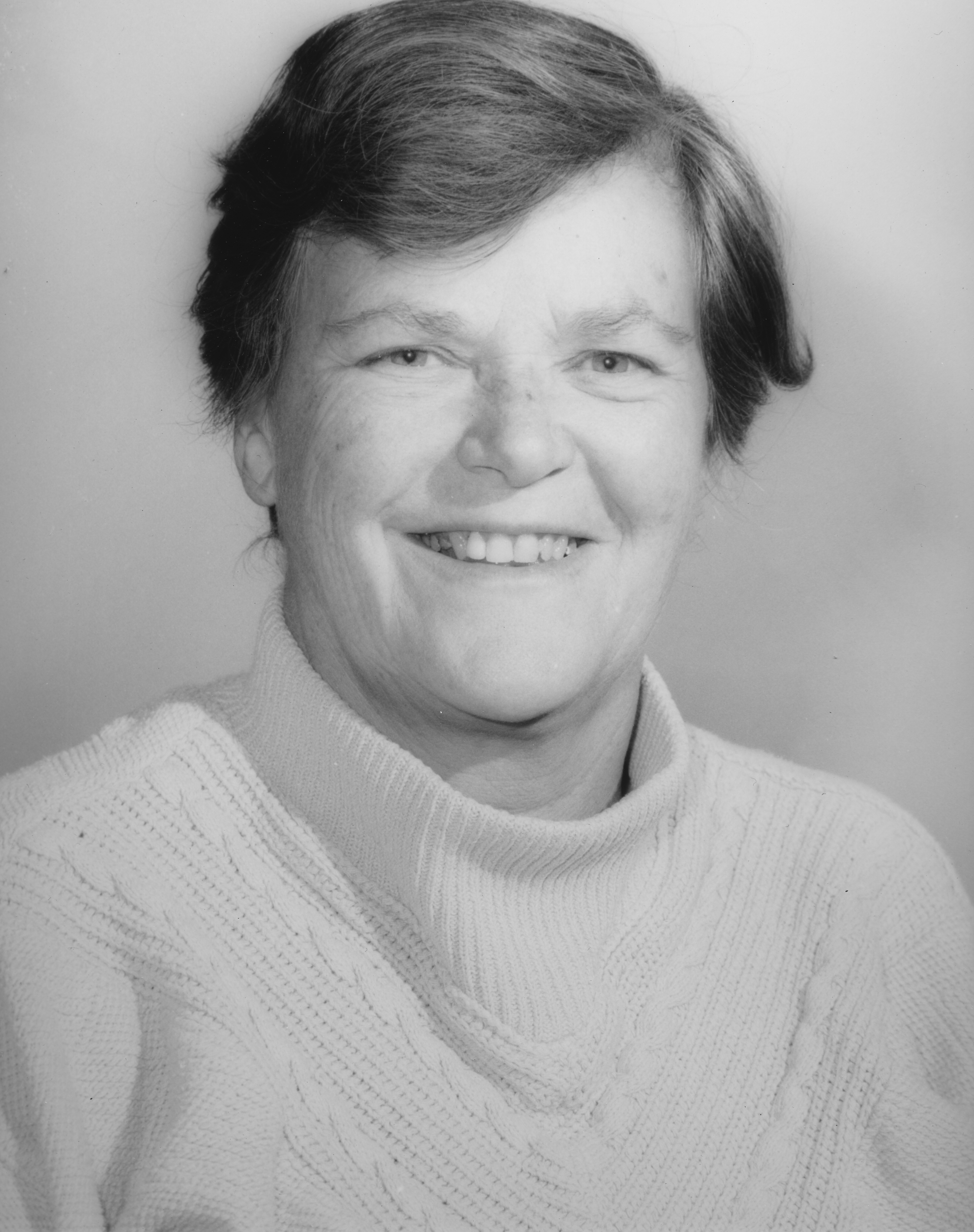
- Born: Ailsa Horton Dicken; 14 June 1927; West Bromwich, Staffordshire, England
- Died: 16 May 2021 (aged 93)
- Education: Malvern Collegiate Institute
- Alma mater: London School of Economics
- Known for: Branch and bound algorithm
- Spouse: Frank Land
- Scientific career
- Fields: Operational research
- Workplaces: London School of Economics
- Thesis: An application of the techniques of linear programming to the transportation of coal (1956)

Ailsa Horton Land (née Dicken; 14 June 1927 – 16 May 2021) was a professor of Operational Research in the Department of Management at the London School of Economics and was the first woman professor of Operational Research in Britain. She is most well known for co-defining the branch and bound algorithm along with Alison Doig whilst carrying out research at the London School of Economics in 1960. She was married to Frank Land, who is an emeritus Professor at the LSE.

== Early life ==
Ailsa Horton Dicken was born on 14 June 1927 in West Bromwich, Staffordshire, the only daughter of Elizabeth (née Greig) and Harold Dicken. Her father worked in his family sports retail business and later became a salesman for Dunlop. Ailsa was keen on science in school, but didn't thrive in her local grammar school in Lichfield, disliking the discipline, so her parents sent her to Rocklands, a small, mixed boarding school in Hastings in East Sussex for a year. This school had only around 50 students, and students were encouraged to work at their own pace with a particular focus on mathematics. Students were also taken to institutions around Hastings including a gasworks where they were shown how coking coal was converted into gas to be used in homes.

When World War Two broke out her mother moved them to Canada, hoping to spend the war with relatives there. The pair departed in April and by September 3, Britain and Canada were at war with Germany, leaving Ailsa and her mother trapped in Canada. Ailsa's father remained in England and served as a Catering Officer in RAF Bomber Command stations until the end of the War in 1945. Ailsa and her mother eventually settled in Toronto, where Ailsa attended the Malvern Collegiate Institute for three years.

In 1943, Ailsa and her mother Elizabeth decided to join the Canadian Women's Army Corps (aged 16, Ailsa had to claim to be 18 to qualify to join up). By 1944 they were both working in clerical jobs in the National Defence Headquarters in Ottawa which was run entirely by female staff to replace male soldiers that were dispatched to England to prepare for the invasion of Nazi-occupied France. Ailsa and her mother ultimately obtained compassionate discharges to return to the UK as Harold Dicken, (serving as a catering officer in the RAF), was undergoing a dangerous operation (which he survived).

== Education ==
Ailsa was able to enter the LSE to study for a degree in economics in 1946, her position as a demobilised servicewoman helping her gain access and a grant. She won the Bowley Prize for a first-year Economics paper. Graduating in 1950, she spent the rest of her career at the institution.

Land obtained her PhD from the London School of Economics in 1956, her dissertation was entitled An Application of the Techniques of Linear Programming to the Transportation of Coal, supervised by George Morton. Her PhD work focused on solving a large transport problem without a computer in which the origin to destination costs are unknown and only the rail network distances between junctions are known.

== Research ==
After securing a position as Research Assistantship in the Economics Research Division at LSE in 1950, Land progressed through the ranks of research assistant, lecturer, senior lecturer, reader, and then chaired professor. Her economics background informed her subsequent contributions to OR, beginning with her 1956 dissertation on the application of OR techniques to the transportation of coking coal.

Ailsa is most known for her development, along with Alison Doig, of what later came to be called the branch-and-bound method for optimization problems with integer variables. Their work was published in Econometrica in 1960. This work was initially carried out at the London School of Economics under the sponsorship of British Petroleum, with the aim of enhancing existing linear programming models for refinery operations. Ailsa and Alison did not have access to a computer at the time, but they developed an algorithm that could be converted to Fortran by British Petroleum Staff. The method is now the most prevalent solution method for NP-hard optimization problems.

Land also worked with Helen Makower and George Morton in the late 1950s on a number of integer programming problems. This included her early investigations of the travelling salesman problem, beginning with a 1955 paper with Morton, and continuing with a 1979 research report on 100 city travelling salesman problems. In addition, Land advanced OR methodology through the publication of notable work on shortest path algorithms, quadratic programming, bicriteria decision problems, and statistical data fitting. Following her retirement from the LSE in 1987, she continued several research projects, resulting in contributions to data envelopment analysis, the quadratic assignment problem, and combinatorial auctions.

In addition to her methodological work, Ailsa worked on the development of computational tools. In 1973, Ailsa published her book Fortran Codes for Mathematical Programming: Linear, Quadratic and Discrete, written jointly with Susan Powell. This provided detailed documentation for computer implementations of optimization techniques as well as the underlying mathematical background and a suite of test problems. A subsequent 1979 publication, also with Susan Powell, offered guidance to consumers of mixed-integer programming and combinatorial programming. Her computer codes for data envelopment analysis and for the travelling salesman problem were all made freely available to the optimization community.

== Teaching ==
During Land's teaching career at the LSE, she helped to establish a two-year diploma in OR at the LSE for students from the British Iron and Steel Association. Later she instituted a mathematical programming course at the undergraduate level as well as an advanced graduate course for the MSc program.

Land mentored both master's level and PhD students, several of whom have achieved international distinction.

== Awards and honours ==
Land was awarded the Harold Larnder prize by the Canadian Operational Research Society in 1994 for achieving international distinction in operational research.

A student award at the London School of Economics, the Ailsa Land Prize, is given annually in her honour.

Land was posthumously awarded the EURO Gold Medal, the highest distinction within OR in Europe, at the EURO Conference in 2021. She was inducted into the Hall of Fame of the International Federation of Operational Research Societies in 2023.

== Personal life ==
She met her future husband Frank Land, in her graduating class. He had come to Britain with his parents and twin brother in 1939 as refugees from Nazi Germany and was one of the computing pioneers who developed the Leo computer for J Lyons & Co, and later is a professor at LSE. They married in 1953 and had three children, Frances, Richard and Margi during her PhD studies.

Following her retirement from teaching and administration in 1987, Land continued to work on research projects, stating ‘Now I'm retired I can do some research!”, until she and her husband moved to Devon in 2000, where she became a clerk to the parish meeting in Harford, near Ivybridge, between trips abroad, moving to Totnes in 2015.

Ailsa Land died on 16 May 2021 at the age of 93.
