= Kar-go =

Autonomous delivery vehicle

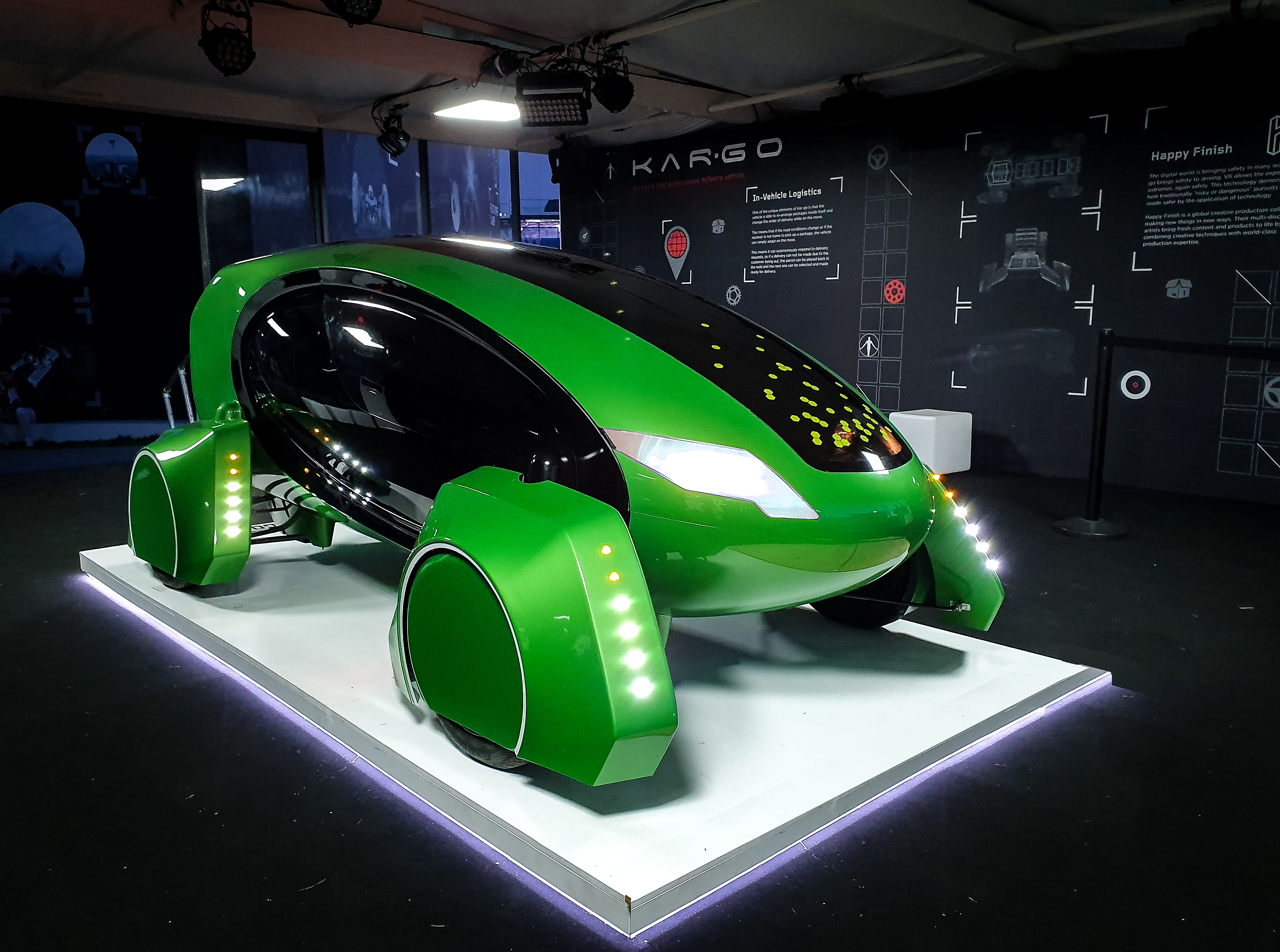
- Founded: 2017
- Founder: William Sachiti
- Headquarters: Wales, United Kingdom
- Owner: Academy of Robotics
- Number of employees: 10+
- Website: academyofrobotics.co.uk

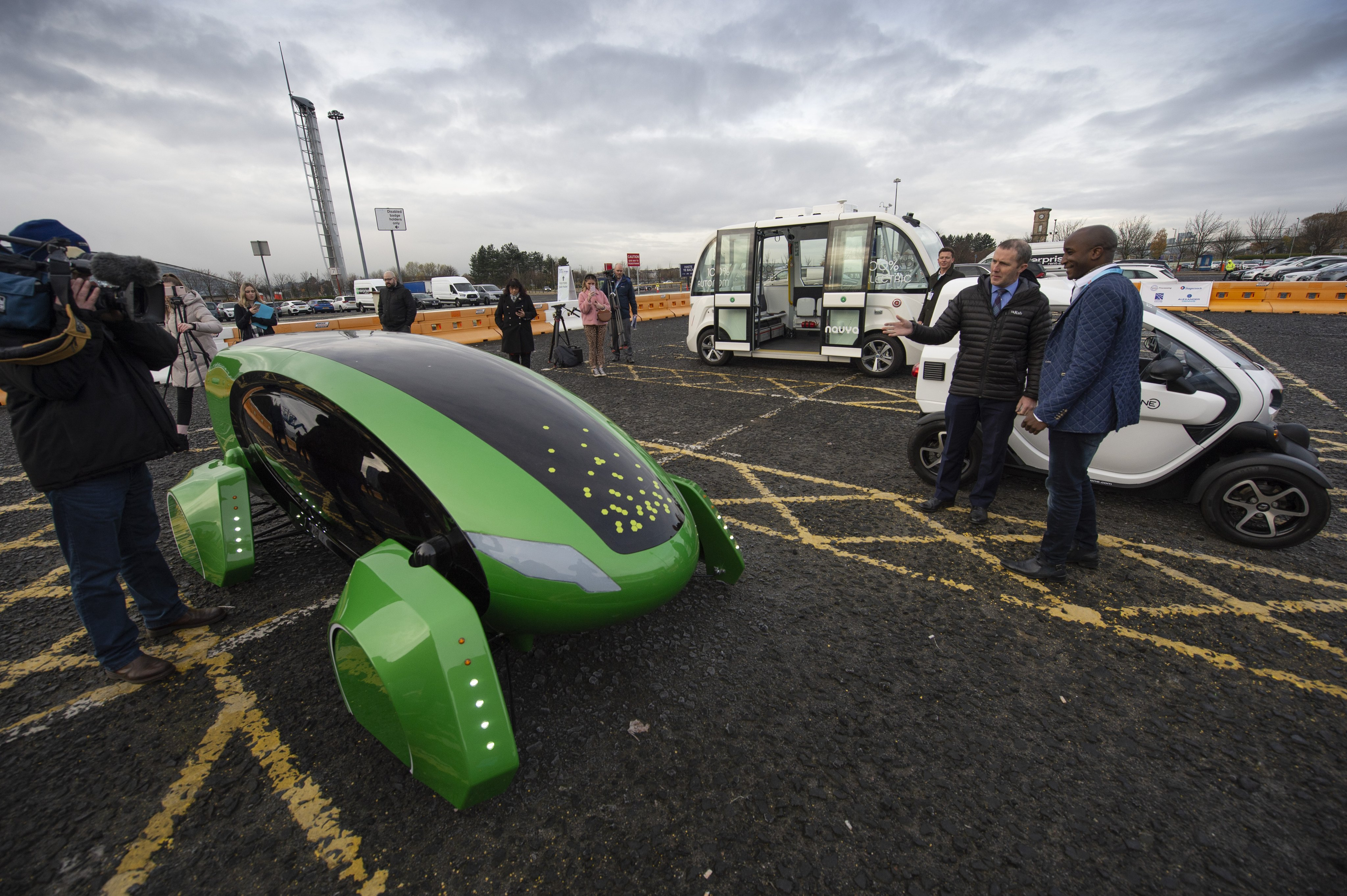
Cabinet Secretary for Transport, Infrastructure and Connectivity pictured with Kar-go

Kar-go is an autonomous delivery vehicle designed and built by the Academy of Robotics Ltd, a British company registered in Wales. The vehicle uses self-driving technology to travel to locations and deliver packages autonomously.

== History ==
The parent company, Academy of Robotics, was founded in 2017 by entrepreneur William Sachiti at Aberystwyth University. With a £10,000 grant from the university as part of its InvEnterPrize scheme, Academy of Robotics began developing the technology and the first prototype for Kar-go was unveiled in 2017. In late 2016, the company partnered with Pilgrim Motorsports, a specialist UK car manufacturer to build the Kar-go Delivery Bot vehicles. In early 2017, the parent company Academy of Robotics was announced to be part of NVIDIA's accelerator to further develop Kar-go. Shortly after the company's first crowdfunding raise in 2018, Academy of Robotics unveiled its autonomous data-gathering vehicles. These vehicles were used to develop Kar-go's driverless vehicle technology. Data such as imagery for object recognition and geometry to measure distance were collected, to be processed for use in their autonomous vehicles. Having developed basic prototypes to test the vision system, Academy of Robotics went on to develop custom-built vehicle hardware. The resulting Kar-go delivery bot vehicle was unveiled at the Goodwood Festival of Speed in 2019.

As a new vehicle type, the Kar-go Delivery Bot underwent an assessment by the UK's Driver and Vehicle Standards Agency (DVSA), which verified that the core vehicle was roadworthy. Following minor modifications to install the autonomous technology, the vehicle was ready for road trials.

UK government requirements for trialling an automated vehicle include ensuring the vehicle is roadworthy, having appropriate insurance in place, and securing a driver or operator, inside or outside of the vehicle, who is ready, able, and willing to resume control.

These initial deliveries were part of a trial supported by funding for no-human-contact deliveries from UK Research and Innovation as part of the Government's modern industrial strategy. Academy of Robotics chose to begin these first deliveries with the delivery of medical supplies from pharmacies to care homes in the London Borough of Hounslow.

As part of these trials, the company developed a system for a remote command centre for a fleet of self-driving vehicles.

In February 2021, the company announced that it would be expanding its autonomous delivery trials to Surrey and other parts of the UK. The Surrey trials saw the company deliver goods for local Banstead (Surrey) store, Something Special.

In September 2021, the Royal Air Force (RAF) and Academy of Robotics announced that the RAF had been trialling the use of Kar-go autonomous delivery vehicles at the UK's largest airbase, RAF Brize Norton. The trials were jointly funded by the Academy of Robotics and the RAF's Astra innovation programme to understand and investigate the potential to use autonomous delivery vehicles to support the work of RAF personnel.

To comply with base security regulations, the company developed a proprietary navigation system that minimised data capture, allowing the vehicle to operate safely without standard scanning and training. In late September 2021, BBC Click featured both the Surrey and RAF trials, featuring the company's Mobile Command Hub. This enables the company to monitor and remotely take-over control from the Kar-go vehicles if necessary. By utilizing this remote functionality, the company can operate without an in-vehicle safety driver while remaining fully compliant with UK guidelines for trials of autonomous vehicles on the roads.

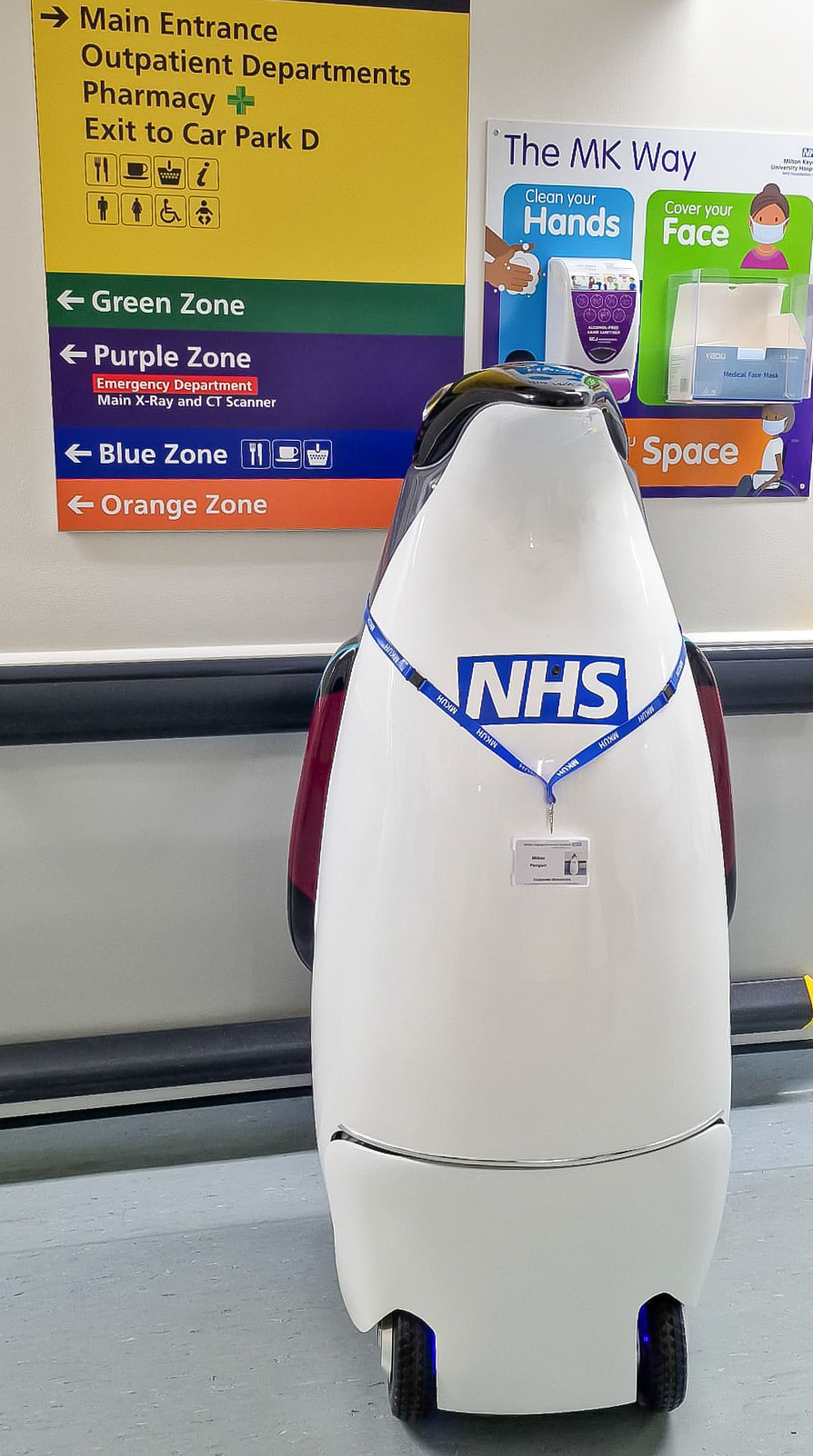
"Milton," a helper bot, developed by Academy of Robotics in the corridor at Milton Keynes University Hospital

The technology developed to operate the Kar-go vehicles has since been applied to "Helper Bots" developed by Academy of Robotics in close collaboration with staff at Milton Keynes University Hospital NHS Foundation Trust. In December 2022, Academy of Robotics unveiled its "Milton" Helper Bot, which the company had developed to support staff by automating the delivery of medicines in hospitals. The company began trials of their Helper Bot technology at Milton Keynes University Hospital at the end of 2022.

== Technology ==
Localisation on the route is achieved by fusing data from Visual Simultaneous localisation and mapping (SLAM), GPS feeds and pre-existing offline map features. Real-time perception is implemented via a novel modular hierarchical architecture consisting of multiple function-specific neural networks and computer vision algorithms that have been fine-tuned for the particular route.

The control software is completely autonomous once delivery timings and locations are determined. This is done autonomously using the Academy of Robotics’ proprietary vision system. It makes high-level navigation turns such as intersection turns, lane changes etc. based on the vehicle's presence in a ‘global map space’ which is updated continuously based on factors such as delivery locations, traffic, routes of other delivery vehicles etc.

The company's research focuses on applying bio-inspired algorithms to solve challenging vision-based problems. Rather than using technology like LiDAR, Kar-go uses camera vision.

The sensor suite focuses on vision with 6-8 cameras fitted on the vehicle depending on the particular operational configuration. The vehicle has GPS, IMU and a ring of sonar/distance sensors around it for a perception redundancy.

== Production ==
Kar-go was built in the UK in West Sussex. The vehicle was built in collaboration between the team at Academy of Robotics, the engineering team at Pilgrim Motorsports and Muscle Car UK's factory where it was being built from scratch. Some of the Kar-go scientists and engineers are also based at Pilgrim Motorsports. In March 2018, the company announced that it had hired multi-award-winning vehicle design expert Paul Burgess from McLaren who led the engineering team.

== See also ==
- Starship Technologies
- Drive PX-series
- Otto (company)
- Waymo
- Tesla, Inc.
