= Shakespeare Walks =

Street theatre performance in London

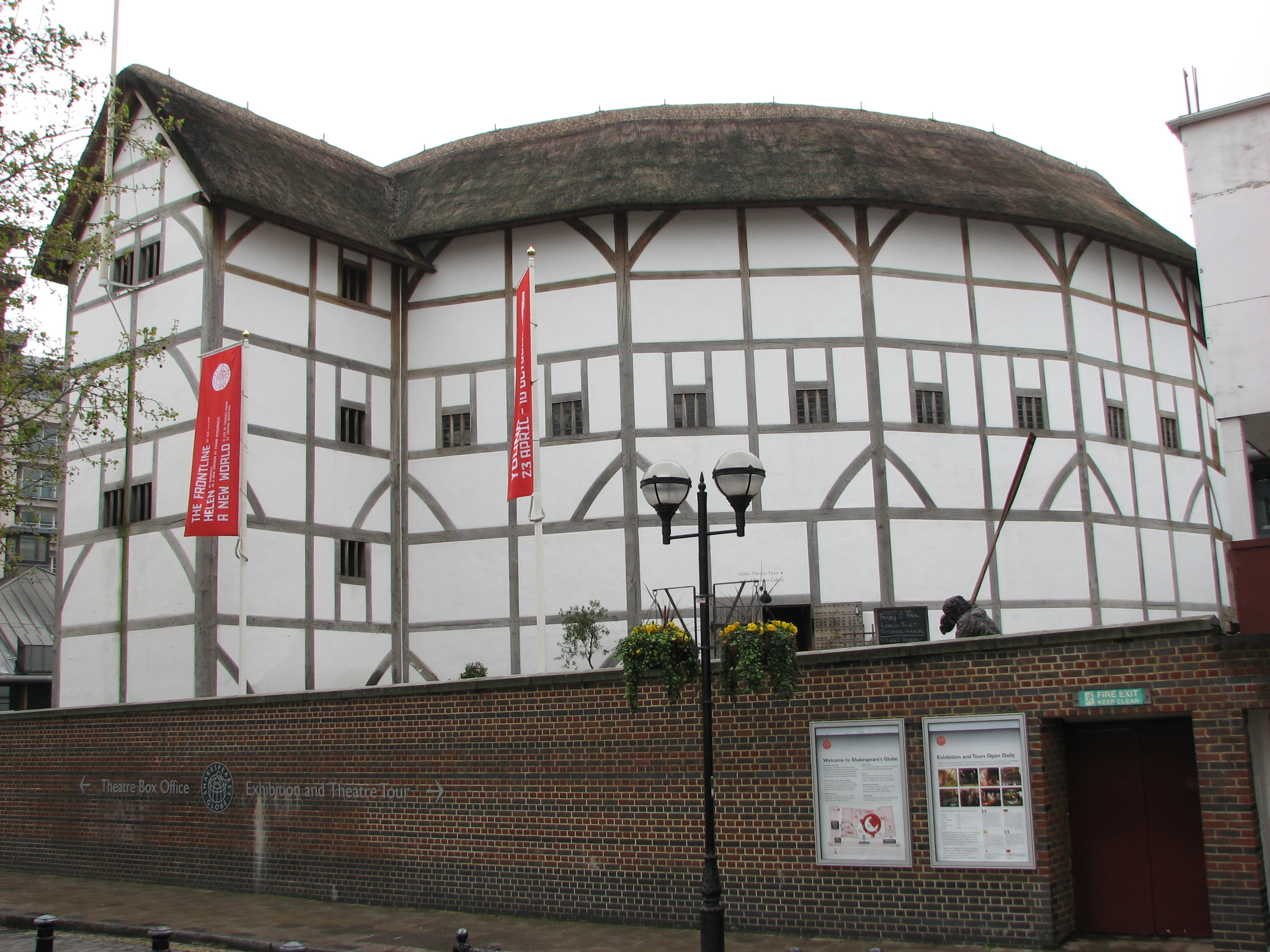
Shakespeare's Globe theatre in London, where the walks end

Shakespeare Walks is a street theatre event produced by Shakespeare's Globe to mark William Shakespeare's birthday. It has taken place annually in April for over 25 years. Paying audiences go on a two-hour walk across London where they get to visit places that Shakespeare knew and encounter different scenes, speeches, and sonnets, performed by actors in streets and parks.

There are different routes audiences can choose from, starting from the parish of Shoreditch, where the original theatre was built in 1576, or from Westminster. All the walks end at Shakespeare's Globe.
