= Eugene Ankomah =

British-Ghanaian Contemporary Artist

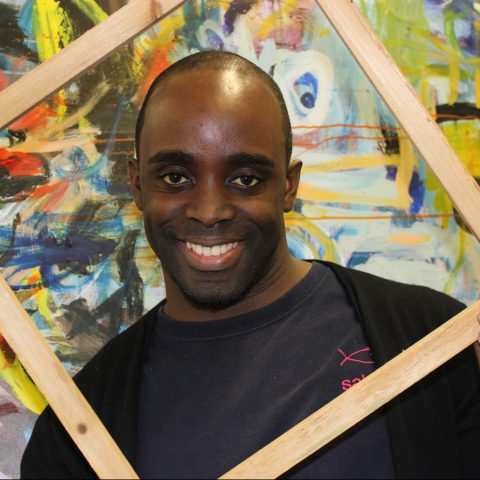
- Eugene Ankomah, 2017
- Born: Eugene Ankomah; 8 June 1978 (age 48); London, England
- Education: Central Saint Martins College of Art and Design; University of Westminster
- Known for: Painting, drawing, sculpture, printmaking, tribal art, contemporary art, mixed media art
- Notable work: Drunkenness, Elijah Ascending to Heaven
- Awards: Peter Evans Award, Apthorp Fund for Young Artists, Contemporary Portraits Prize, Urban Tension Prize
- Website: eugeneankomah.com

Eugene Ankomah (born 8 June 1978) is a self-taught British contemporary visual artist of Ghanaian descent, with an art career that has spanned more than eighteen years.

== Early life ==
Born and raised in the London Borough of Brent, northwest London, Ankomah spent his early childhood living in Ghana with his parents and four siblings, before his family relocated to the United Kingdom in 1990.

He attended Willesden High School in 1991 now known as Capital City Academy, He then studied at Central Saint Martins College of Art and Design, before going on to earn a bachelor's degree in Illustration and Fine Art at the University of Westminster.

== Awards and prizes ==
At the age of 17, Ankomah became the first ever recipient of the Peter Evans Award, awarded by his school for best student, winning a prize fund of £900 as part of the prize. He has been awarded from The Apthorp Fund for Young Artists (which he won twice in 1999 and 2002), Urban Tension' Prize and Contemporary Portraits' Prize.

== Shows and exhibitions ==
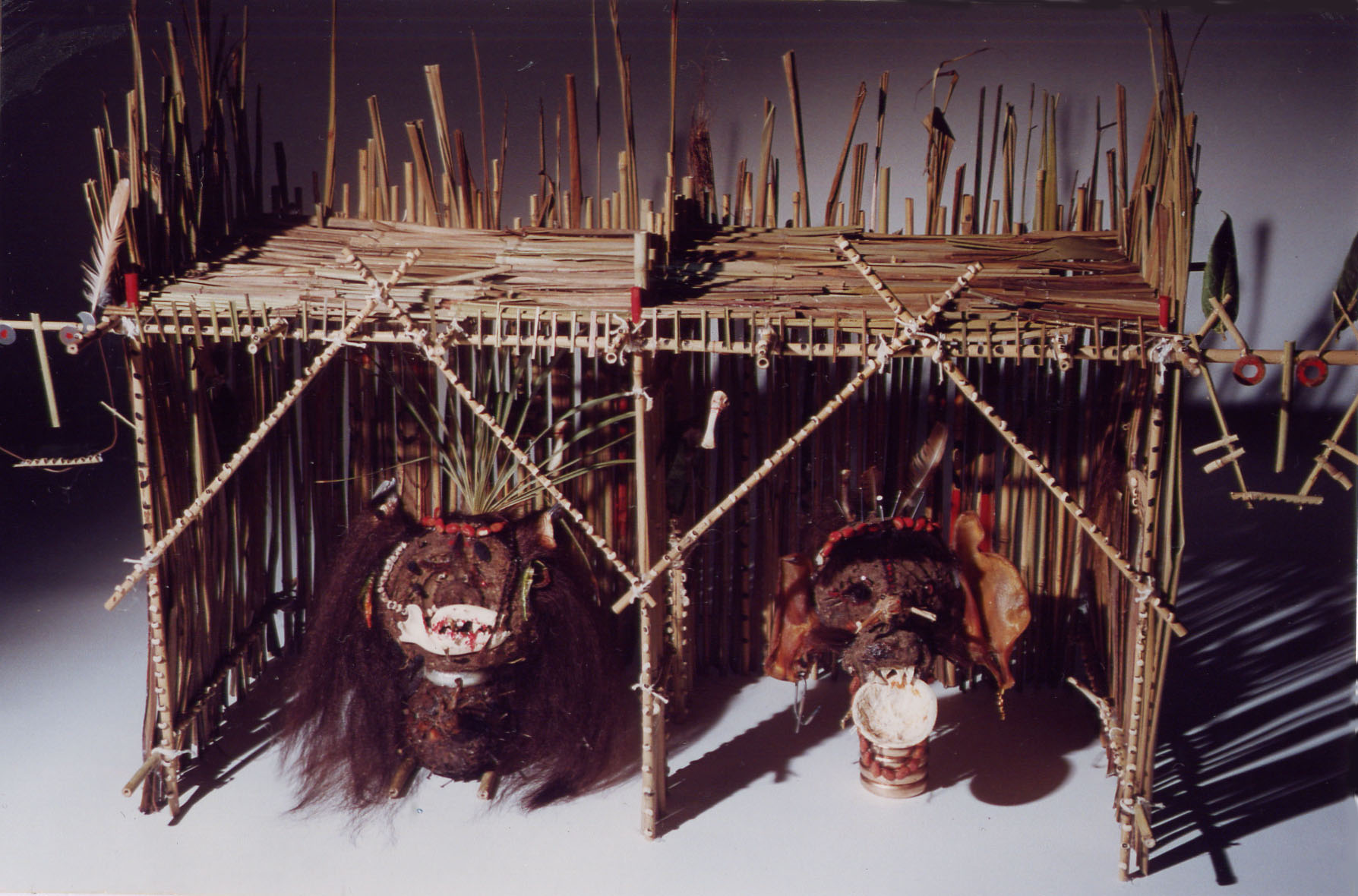
"Icarus and Amadeus" Tribal Sculpture by Eugene Ankomah. From the Tribal Works series.

To date, Ankomah has taken part in more than 90 shows and exhibitions.

He was chosen by the National Campaign for the Arts (NCA) – then chaired by Melvyn Bragg (presenter of ITV's The South Bank Show and long-time broadcaster) – to showcase his work in a 2003 major solo show entitled The Birth at London's Carnaby Street.

In 2008, Ankomah took part in a group show entitled An Expo of Artful Dodgers among a list of UK visual artists. He was part of a selected group of artists described as "the cream of up-and-coming talent" by The Daily Telegraph.

During this period Ankomah took part in several other group shows, including Graffiti Express (which he curated), an experimental group show which took place at The Wall at the Gallery in Willesden Green.

== Commissions and projects ==
In 2002 Ankomah was one of a group of artists that worked on a flag for Buckingham Palace in honour of the Golden Jubilee of Elizabeth II. In 2010 his works were part of a Coalition Government Christmas card.
