= Carl Cushnie =

Carlton Ellington ("Carl") Cushnie is a businessman from the United Kingdom. In the late-1990s, he was estimated to be the richest black man in Europe and among the 100 wealthiest people in Britain. However his finance company, Versailles, went bust after an investigation by the Department of Trade and Industry in 1999 revealed that most of the company's trading turnover was fabricated and the company was part of a Ponzi scheme. Cushnie was sentenced to six years in prison in 2004 after being found guilty of conspiracy to defraud.

== Biography ==
Cushnie was born in Kingston, Jamaica, and moved to London at the age of 13. He began his career as a computer programmer at ICL, before going on to found a software business, Pentagon Business Systems PLC. He later founded Versailles, a group of companies which purported to be involved in the factoring business, effectively providing loans to manufacturers by buying their merchandise after a sale had been agreed to another company but before they had been paid for it. Potential investors were told that Cushnie used computer software to personally keep track of exactly what each investor's money had bought, whether it be "shorts or golf balls".

In fact, the company only made one such trade, on which it lost money. Although one department was trading legitimately, the large majority of the company's turnover was produced by moving money back and forth between companies controlled by Cushnie and his co-director, Frederick Clough, who had also been part of Pentagon Business Systems. 'Profits' paid out came from new capital from investors and bank loans, "a classic Ponzi scheme".

The company was floated on the Alternative Investment Market in 1995 and moved to the full London Stock Exchange Official List in 1997. Its share price was 8 pence at the time of flotation, and rose to 250 pence in December 1999, thanks to annual accounts showing turnover and assets significantly higher than they in fact were. Cushnie retained a controlling stake in the company which gave him an estimated worth of £340 million, and sold part of his shareholding at the top of the market for £28.6 million.

In 1999, following a six-figure donation to the Labour Party, Cushnie was chosen by Tony Blair to appear in a European election broadcast for the party alongside Mick Hucknall and Alex Ferguson. In the broadcast, Cushnie spoke flatteringly about Blair's leadership abilities.

On 5 May 1999, before the broadcast, the Department of Trade and Industry had instigated an investigation into the company, and in November accountants were asked to examine it under the rules of the LSE. Trading in the shares, then at 268p giving the company a value of £632 million, was suspended on 8 December 1999. Versailles collapsed after it emerged that its reported turnover had been fabricated.

Cushnie claimed that the fraud had been perpetrated by the Versailles finance director, Clough, and that he was unaware of it. In 2004, at their four-month-long trial, Cushnie exercised his right not to give evidence while Clough, who had been stealing money from the company, pleaded guilty and gave evidence for the prosecution. After ten days of jury deliberations, Cushnie was found guilty of fraud in one of the smaller trading companies but cleared of the larger fraud in Versailles and both men were sentenced to six years in prison (Clough's sentence later being reduced to five years on appeal) and banned from being directors of any company for many years. Cushnie was also ordered to pay back £10,140,732 of the money he had defrauded or serve an additional three years.

In June 2001, one month before charges were brought against him, Cushnie transferred control of a substantial property in the south of France to his sister. This was challenged by those who had lost money in his company, and a judge described his explanation that it was done for inheritance tax reasons as "highly unconvincing". Following his conviction, one investor sued to recover their losses. Cushnie first claimed that they were not the relevant investor, a suggestion described as "completely fanciful" by the judge, then that the documents were forgeries, which the judge said had "simply no evidence" to support it.

Although his appeal against conviction was refused, he continues to maintain that he was innocent of all fraud committed within the company. Cushnie continues to reside in the UK.
