= Kathy Tayler =

British TV presenter and former pentathlete

- Born: Katherine Mary Tayler; 23 March 1960 (age 66)
- Occupation: Broadcaster
- Years active: 1983–present
- Spouse(s): Allen Olley, m. 5 September 1987
- Children: 1 daughter, 2 sons

Kathy Tayler (born 23 March 1960) is a British television presenter and former champion modern pentathlete. She is best known for co-presenting on TV-am between 1989 and 1992, and Holiday on BBC One, alongside Des Lynam and Anne Gregg.

== Athletics ==
Tayler won the women's modern pentathlon World Cup in 1979 at the age of 19. She was a member of the Great Britain modern pentathlon team that won gold at the Modern Pentathlon World Championships in 1981 and 1982. She also won a bronze medal in the individual competition at the same event in 1982. She retired from competition in 1983 and she gained a BSc honours degree in physiology at the University of Southampton.

== TV career ==
After appearing as a contestant on the TV sports quiz A Question of Sport she was offered and accepted the job of presenter on a sport-themed television programme for children called Stopwatch.

Tayler joined TV-am in 1989 as co-presenter of Good Morning Britain with Mike Morris and Richard Keys. When Jayne Irving stopped presenting the After Nine programme, in the screening slot immediately after Good Morning Britain, Tayler took her place and remained a regular presenter until the programme ended in December 1992.

She presented and reported on BBC's Holiday for 12 years, initially specialising in physically demanding outdoor assignments. After the birth of her first child in 1991, her emphasis changed to family and long haul holidays.

After taking a career break to raise her family she returned to TV as a presenter on shopping channel QVC.

== Personal life ==
Tayler married photographer Alan Olley in September 1987. The couple have three children.

== Sports accomplishments ==
- 1979 Modern Pentathlon Women's World Cup – winner
- 1981 Modern Pentathlon World Championships – Women's Team Gold
- 1982 Modern Pentathlon World Championships – Women's Team Gold, Individual Bronze
