= Simon McCoy =

British journalist

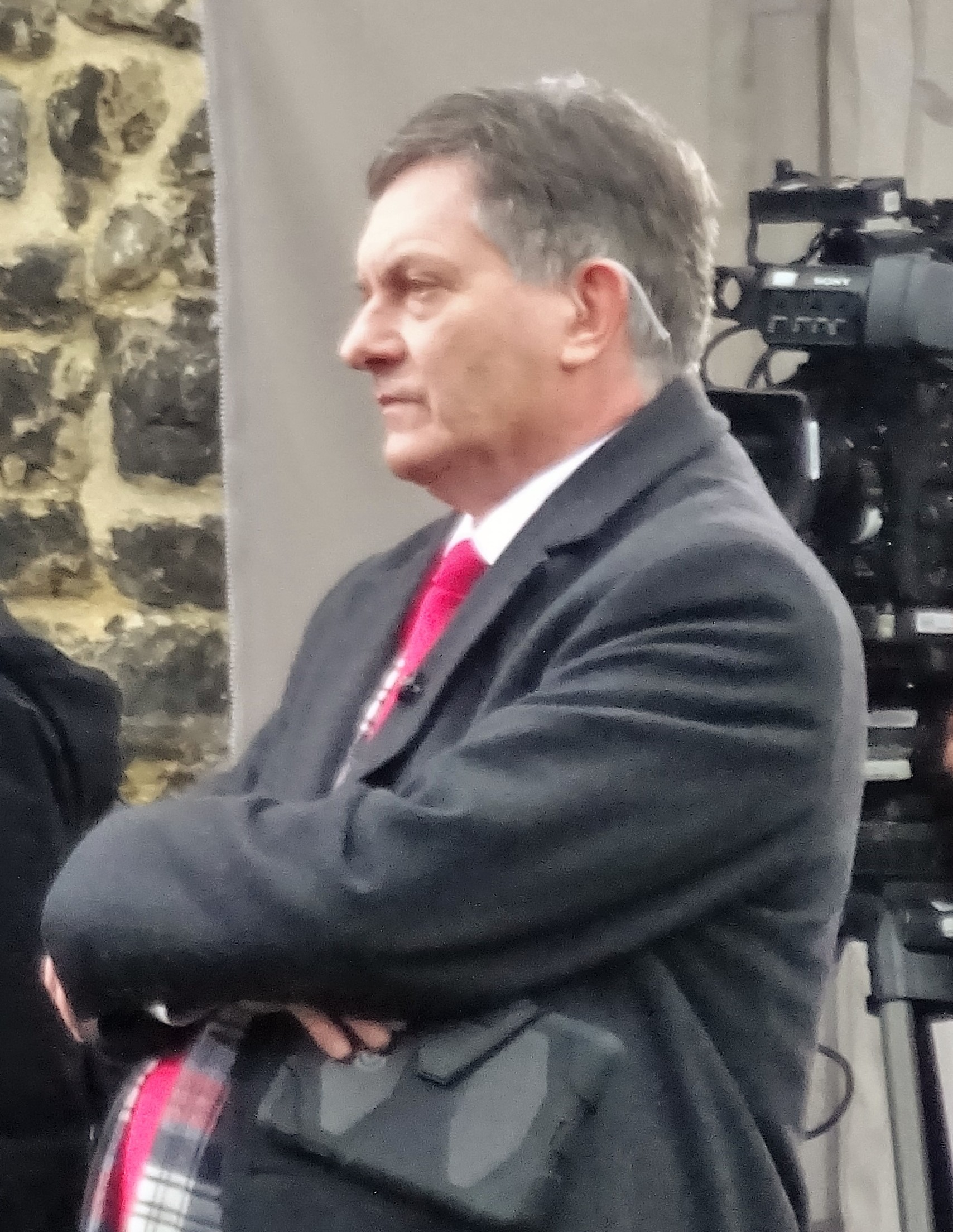
- McCoy in 2018
- Born: 7 October 1961 (age 64); Hammersmith, London, England
- Education: Sherborne School
- Occupations: Journalist; newsreader
- Notable credits: BBC News; BBC News at One; BBC News at Six; BBC News at Ten; BBC Weekend News; Afternoon Live; GB News
- Spouses: Victoria Graham (m. 2007; div. 2019) Emma Samms (m. 2021)
- Children: 1

Simon McCoy (born 7 October 1961) is a British journalist and former newsreader on BBC News, Sky News and GB News.

== Early life ==
McCoy was born on 7 October 1961 in Hammersmith. He was educated at the private Sherborne School in the town of Sherborne in north-west Dorset, England.

== Career ==
McCoy started his journalism career at the Fleet Street News Agency in London before joining Thames TV as a researcher for Thames News in 1983. After time as a scriptwriter at Thames TV, in 1986 he joined the breakfast TV station TV-am as a news editor. In 1988, McCoy left TV-am to join the new satellite channel Sky – initially as a producer on the Sky News breakfast programme Sunrise.

In 2003, McCoy co-anchored Sky's coverage of the Iraq War on location in Kuwait and Basra. He was on air for five hours every day of the conflict.

In January 2004, McCoy joined the BBC, and could be seen on BBC Breakfast and BBC News 24, initially as a cover presenter for both. In September 2005, he took over the morning slot on BBC News alongside Kate Silverton following Phillip Hayton's sudden departure after Hayton fell out with Silverton. When reviewing the papers the following day, McCoy tried to point out the story, but was prevented by Silverton. In December 2007, Silverton left the shift to host the 8pm Update.

On 9 March 2012, McCoy was apparently caught asleep face-down at the newsdesk as BBC Breakfast handed over to the BBC News channel at 8:30 am. McCoy joked that he had "just been told the Queen wanted me to cover her next visit".

Shortly before 1pm GMT on 18 March 2013, McCoy and co-presenter Sophie Long read the final BBC News bulletin from BBC Television Centre, with BBC News moving to Broadcasting House in the West End of London for the BBC News at One.

On 22 July, McCoy was on the roster for coverage of the birth of the first child of the Duke and Duchess of Cambridge, who a few days later was named Prince George of Cambridge. Stationed outside the Lindo Wing at St Mary's Hospital with often little or no news to share, McCoy's comments concerning the value of the news coverage made for (often sympathetic) headlines. He said: "The news is there is no news".

In September 2013, a live broadcast by McCoy went viral after he inadvertently picked up a refill pack of A4 printer paper instead of his iPad while presenting to camera. A BBC spokeswoman said: "This morning as Simon McCoy was preparing to introduce this story, instead of picking up his tablet to hold as he went to air, he mistakenly picked up a ream of paper that was sitting next to it. In the rush of live news, he didn't have an opportunity to swap the items, so simply went with it."

McCoy presented the weekday 2–5 pm slot, titled Afternoon Live, on BBC News.

On 25 March 2021, McCoy announced it was his last day working for the BBC. It was later announced he was moving to GB News to present an afternoon show alongside Alex Phillips titled McCoy & Phillips. On his reason for leaving the BBC and joining GB News, he said he wanted a new challenge. He also said he was "not a leftie BBC journalist" and voted 'Leave' in the 2016 EU referendum. In July 2021, he moved to present the breakfast show, The Great British Breakfast, alongside Kirsty Gallacher. In December 2021, McCoy left GB News citing personal reasons. The GB News morning show direct replacement for McCoy was veteran broadcaster Eamonn Holmes who joined the breakfast team from ITV, on 3 January 2022.

== Personal life ==
On 28 September 2007, he married Victoria Graham of BBC South West. They announced their divorce in January 2019. In March 2020, McCoy was reported as being in a relationship with the actress Emma Samms. They married on 9 October 2021 and live in Stroud, Gloucestershire.
