= Trisha Goddard =

English television presenter (born 1957)

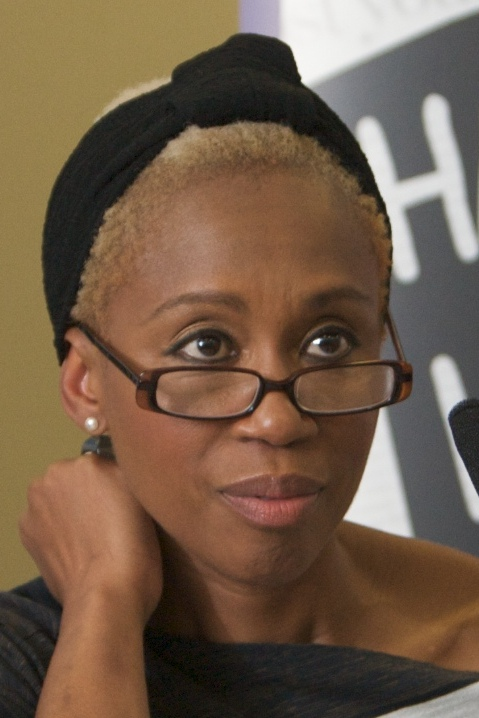
- Goddard in 2009
- Born: Patricia Gloria Goddard; 23 December 1957 (age 68); Hackney, London, England
- Occupation: Television presenter
- Years active: 1987–present
- Spouse(s): Robert Nestdale (m. 1985; div. 1986) Mark Grieve (m. 1993; div. 1996) Peter Gianfrancesco (m. 1998; div. 2017) Allen (m. 2022)
- Children: 2

Patricia Gloria Goddard (born 23 December 1957) is a British television presenter. From 1998 to 2010, she presented the talk show Trisha, which was broadcast in a mid-morning slot on ITV, before later being moved to Channel 5. She also hosted an American version of her eponymous show, which ran from 2012 until 2014.

Goddard began her career in Australia hosting the children's show Play School (1987–1998) on ABC TV, and presenting the current affairs programme The 7:30 Report (1988–1990) on the same network. In 2010, she was a conflict resolution expert for the American talk show Maury. In 2021, Goddard began presenting on talkRADIO, and went on to join its television equivalent TalkTV when it launched the following year. In 2022, she fronted a revival series of the dieting show You Are What You Eat on Channel 5.

In 2020, Goddard was a contestant on the twelfth series of Dancing on Ice. In 2025, she appeared as a housemate on the twenty-fourth series of the reality show Celebrity Big Brother. Goddard has been diagnosed with breast cancer twice, in 2008 and 2023 respectively, and is the patron of several charities.

== Early life ==
Patricia Gloria Goddard was born in Hackney, London on 23 December 1957, the daughter of Agnes Fortune, an auxiliary nurse from Dominica, and an unknown father. She did not discover that the white man who raised her was not her biological father until after her mother's death, though he was the biological father of her three sisters. In her late-50s, Goddard set out to find details of her biological father after a genetics expert insisted that her skin colour made it almost impossible for her to have a white father. As a child, she was educated at an independent school for expatriates in Tanzania, after which she returned to England to attend primary school in Heacham, Norfolk. She then joined Sir William Perkins's School in Chertsey, Surrey, which was a voluntary controlled Church of England girls' grammar school at the time.

== Career ==
Goddard's early career as a flight attendant led to travel writing for magazines and then, after settling in Australia in the mid-1980s, she embarked on a career in television. She worked there as a television presenter, most notably on ABC's The 7.30 Report, and also as a host of the children's programme Play School.

In 1998, after returning to the United Kingdom, Goddard became the host of an ITV flagship daytime chat show, Trisha, produced by Anglia Television. She launched her own independent television production company, Town House TV, with former Director of Programmes and Production for ITV Anglia, Malcolm Allsop. In September 2004, Goddard left ITV to join Channel 5 in which her show was relaunched and given the new title Trisha Goddard, which made its network debut on 24 January 2005. Similar in style to the previous iteration, it focussed on relationships, families in crisis, and reunions. The show was produced by Town House Productions. In the early stages of the show, it was observed that repeats of her ITV show continued to achieve higher ratings than her new programme on Channel 5. In January 2009, Channel 5 announced it would not be renewing her contract, for financial reasons. The final episode of her chat show aired in December 2010.

A parody of Goddard was portrayed by comedian Leigh Francis in the Channel 4 sketch show Bo' Selecta!, which Goddard said her children suffered from bullying as a result. Goddard made several appearances as a panellist on ITV's Loose Women from 2002. She appeared as herself in satires of her chat show in various television shows. In 2003, a specially-shot clip of her show appeared in the ITV religious fantasy drama The Second Coming. In 2004, she filmed two short scenes for the romantic zombie comedy Shaun of the Dead. Both scenes were filmed on the set of Trisha. In 2004, a facsimile version of her show was featured in the first episode and last episodes of the third series of sitcom Fat Friends, where she interviewed the "slimming group" consisting of the main characters, where Betty (Alison Steadman) unintentionally revealed her secret that she had given up a baby at the age of fifteen. The episode showed the director telling Goddard to remain on Betty and wait until she revealed her secret. Her show was also featured on a Comic Relief episode of Little Britain where the character Vicky Pollard met up with her long-lost father. For a What Not to Wear Christmas special aired on 22 December 2004, Goddard was given a fashion makeover by Trinny Woodall and Susannah Constantine. She appears very briefly in the 2006 Doctor Who episode "Army of Ghosts" in a parody episode of her own show entitled "I Married a Ghost".

In 2006, Goddard appeared as a guest on the BBC's The Kumars at No. 42 and was also the guest host for an episode of the second series of The Friday Night Project, for Channel 4. Goddard also had her own talk show on Liverpool radio station City Talk 105.9. Goddard also made an appearance on Who Wants To Be A Millionaire? raising up to £75,000. She also made an appearance on the BBC show Shooting Stars in 2010. Also that year, she began to make occasional appearances on the American talk programme Maury as a consultant and a guest host. In October 2011, NBCUniversal Television Distribution announced that the network would launch an American version of her eponymous talk show to start in September 2012. In April 2014, it was announced that the programme had been cancelled after two seasons.

In August 2017, Goddard guest hosted the Channel 5 programme The Wright Stuff for five episodes. She was a regular panellist on Channel 5's Big Brother's Bit on the Side. In February 2018, Goddard appeared on an episode of BBC One game show Pointless Celebrities, appearing alongside Katie Derham. In January 2020, Goddard took part in the twelfth series of Dancing on Ice. She was paired with Łukasz Różycki. They were the first couple to be eliminated from the competition after the judges chose to save ITV News presenter Lucrezia Millarini and her skating partner Brendyn Hatfield. In February 2021, Goddard appeared on Piers Morgan's Life Stories. In March 2021, it was announced Goddard would present a revival series of You Are What You Eat, which aired the following year. In August 2021, she served a guest presenter on Jeremy Vine during Vine's absence. The same year, she joined Talkradio and began presenting its television station equivalent, TalkTV from April 2022. In August 2024, Goddard appeared as a guest presenter on Good Morning Britain. In April 2025, Goddard entered the Celebrity Big Brother house to appear as a housemate on the twenty-fourth series.

== Personal life ==
=== Relationships and family ===
Goddard has three younger sisters, Pru, Paula, and Linda. Her youngest sister, Linda, battled schizophrenia and died in 1988 from complications arising from self-inflicted injuries. Goddard has cited this as one of her inspirations in becoming a mental health activist. She has also suffered her own mental health issues, having battled addiction and attempted suicide on at least two occasions.

Goddard has been married four times and divorced three times. Her first marriage was to Robert Nestdale, an Australian politician and erstwhile director of Unicef Australia; whom she met in 1985 whilst working as a flight attendant. The marriage was short-lived: Nestdale was rumoured to be gay, and died from AIDS in 1989. Goddard has recorded that Nestdale was abusive to her during their relationship. She met second husband Mark Grieve, a television producer, in 1987 and they were married in 1993. They had two children together and separated in 1996. Her third husband, Peter Gianfrancesco, worked as a mental health services professional. They married in 1998, with Goddard's children taking their stepfather's surname. The couple divorced in 2017. Goddard has been based in the United States since 2010. In January 2022, Goddard announced on social media that she and her partner of four years, Allen, whom she often colloquially refers to as "Boo", had got engaged. They married in August of that year. Goddard resides in Connecticut, U.S.

=== Health ===
Goddard has been diagnosed with breast cancer twice. First, in 2008, the cancer was treated and cured. In 2023, Goddard was diagnosed with breast cancer for a second time, however, this time it was stage IV. In February 2024, she announced the diagnosis and revealed that it was treatable but not curable. In August 2024, Goddard spoke about her diagnosis, saying that she initially kept it quiet as she just wanted to work and be [herself].

== Filmography ==
As herself
Year	Title	Role	Ref.
1987–1998	Play School	Presenter	
1988–1990s	The 7:30 Report	Presenter	
1998–2010	Trisha	Presenter	
1999	Late Lunch	Guest; 1 episode	
1999	Good News Week	Guest; 1 episode	
1999	An Audience with... Diana Ross	Guest; 1 episode	
1999	Stars in Their Eyes	Guest; 1 episode	
2000	Aladdin	Guest; 1 episode	
2002	TV Nightmares	Guest; 1 episode	
2002–2003	Trisha: Extra	Presenter	
2002–2003, 2014, 2019, 2021	Loose Women	Guest panellist; 13 episodes	
2003	RI:SE	Guest; 1 episode	
2004	Fat Friends	2 episodes	
2004, 2019–2020	This Morning	Guest; 11 episodes	
2004	Have I Got News For You	Guest; 1 episode	
2004	Shaun of the Dead	Cameo role	
2005	The Most Outrageous TV Moments Ever	Presenter	
2005	Who Wants to Be a Millionaire?	Contestant; 1 episode	
2005	Comic Relief	Guest; 1 episode	
2005	Kelly	Guest; 1 episode	
2005	Out of Africa: Heroes and Icons	Guest; 1 episode	
2005, 2007, 2010, 2013	This Week	Guest; 4 episodes	
2005, 2017–2018	The Wright Stuff	Guest / Presenter; 7 episodes	
2005–2007	8 Out of 10 Cats	Guest; 4 episodes	
2006, 2012	Harry Hill's TV Burp	Guest; 2 episodes	
2006	Britain's Psychic Challenge	Presenter	
2006	Doctor Who	Episode: "Army of Ghosts"	
2006	Rob Brydon's Annually Retentive	Guest; 1 episode	
2006	The Friday Night Project	Guest; 1 episode	
2006	Never Mind the Buzzcocks	Guest; 1 episode	
2006	1 Leicester Square	Guest; 1 episode	
2006	The Kumars at No. 42	Guest; 1 episode	
2006	Saturday Night with Miriam	Guest; 1 episode	
2006	The Story of Light Entertainment	Guest; 1 episode	
2006	The Best of the Worst	Guest; 1 episode	
2006	Family History	Guest; 1 episode	
2007	I Blame the Spice Girls: The Monster Quiz of the Decade	Guest; 1 episode	
2007	Jackie Magazine: A Girl's Best Friend	Guest; 1 episode	
2007	Life without Lost	Guest; 1 episode	
2008–2009	The One Show	Guest; 2 episodes	
2008	Al Murray's Happy Hour	Guest; 1 episode	
2008	Would I Lie to You?	Guest; 1 episode	
2008	Alan Carr's Celebrity Ding Dong	Guest; 2 episodes	
2009	Plus One	Guest; 1 episode	
2009	Question Time	Guest; 1 episode	
2010	The Funny Side Of...	Episode: "Chat"	
2010	The Alan Titchmarsh Show	Guest; 1 episode	
2010	Daily Cooks Challenge	Guest; 1 episode	
2010	Shooting Stars	Guest; 1 episode	
2010	Maury	Conflict resolution expert	
2012–2014	The Trisha Goddard Show	Presenter	
2012	Daybreak	Guest; 1 episode	
2017	Me and My Mental Health	Documentary	
2017–2021, 2024	Good Morning Britain	Guest / Guest presenter	
2017–2020, 2024	Lorraine	Guest; 5 episodes	
2017–2018	Big Brother's Bit on the Side	Panellist	
2018	Pointless Celebrities	Guest; 1 episode	
2019, 2021	Jeremy Vine	Guest / Presenter; 13 episodes	
2020	Dancing on Ice	Contestant; series 12	
2020	The Ned Late Late Show	Guest; 1 episode	
2020	Newsnight	Guest; 1 episode	
2020	When TV Guests Go Horribly Wrong	Guest; 1 episode	
2021	Piers Morgan's Life Stories	Guest; 1 episode	
2021	Sky News at Ten	Presenter	
2021	Sky News Tonight	Presenter	
2021	Sky Midnight News	Presenter	
2021	Sky World News	Presenter	
2021	Reliable Sources	Guest; 1 episode	
2021	1000 Years a Slave	Presenter	
2022	You Are What You Eat	Presenter	
2022	Blankety Blank	Guest; 1 episode	
2022–present	TalkTV	Presenter	
2023	Piers Morgan Uncensored	Guest; 1 episode	
2025	Celebrity Big Brother	Housemate; series 24	
