= Jack Emery =

Jack Emery is the name of

- Jack Emery (director) (born 1945), British director, writer and producer
- Jack Emery (athlete) (1913–2013), British runner who won the 1938 International Cross Country Championships
