= Celina Hinchcliffe =

English television sports broadcaster

Celina Alexandra Hinchcliffe (born 21 March 1976 in Windsor, Berkshire) is an English television sports broadcaster. She has worked for BBC, Sky News and ITV.

== Early life ==
Hinchcliffe is the daughter of television producer Philip Hinchcliffe and her uncle is the actor Geoffrey Whitehead. She was educated at the independent Sir William Perkins's School in Chertsey, and gained a BA in Drama and English from the University of Birmingham in 1997. She then attended the London Academy of Music and Dramatic Art.

== Career ==
Hinchcliffe initially worked with various theatre companies.

=== BBC ===
Hinchcliffe got her first break in broadcasting in 2001 at BBC Southern Counties Radio, reporting on the likes of Crawley Town and Lewes. At around the same time, she also appeared on the BBC One game show Dog Eat Dog. From there, she worked as a reporter on African Football for the BBC World Service, and then at BBC Radio 5 Live.

In the summer of 2002, she joined BBC News and BBC World News as a sports presenter. In 2005, she fronted BBC Two's live coverage of England's matches in the women's European football championship. On 21 January 2006, she became the first woman to present BBC One's Saturday lunchtime show Football Focus. In 2005 she was the first woman to present Match of the Day. In 2006, she presented BBC Three's coverage of some England's qualifiers for the FIFA Women's World Cup 2007. In 2008, she also appeared on the BBC 8pm News summary, while usual presenter Ellie Crisell was on maternity leave. In light of BBC Sport presentation moving to MediaCityUK in Salford, Hinchcliffe made her final on-air presentation on the BBC on 21 February 2012.

=== Sky News ===
Hinchcliffe joined Sky News in March 2012 and began presenting sports bulletins for them from January 2013.

=== Freelance ===
As a freelancer, she covers the French Open tennis for ITV alongside John Inverdale.

== Personal life ==
Hinchcliffe married in May 2009, and gave birth to a son the following year. She suffered from post-natal depression but recovered after receiving counselling. She had her second son in 2013.

Hinchcliffe lists her interests as film, theatre, and live music. She is also a supporter of Sheffield Wednesday.
