= Takeover Radio =

Takeover Radio 103.2
- Leicester; United Kingdom
- Frequency: 103.2 FM
- RDS: TAKEOVER

Programming
- Format: Youth Pop

Ownership
- Owner: Takeover Radio Children's Media Trust

History
- First air date: 5 March 2002
- Last air date: 1 January 2023

Links
- Website: www.takeoverradio.co.uk

Takeover Radio 106.9
- Sutton-in-Ashfield; United Kingdom
- Broadcast area: Ashfield, Nottinghamshire
- Frequency: 106.9 FM
- RDS: TAKEOVER

Programming
- Format: Youth Pop

Ownership
- Owner: Sutton Youth Radio Ltd

History
- First air date: January 2010

Links
- Website: https://www.takeoverradiosutton.com/

Takeover UK
- Leicester; United Kingdom
- Frequency: Online

Programming
- Format: Youth Pop

Ownership
- Owner: Management: Ashley Whitehead, Cliff Wheatcroft, Stuart Packwood

Links
- Website: www.takeoveruk.co.uk

Takeover Radio is a community radio station broadcasting on FM to the Ashfield district in Nottinghamshire. Takeover Radio specialises in helping children gain experience and direct participative involvement in radio broadcasting.

Created in 1996, it enjoyed several years output as a programme format on short-term temporary licence stations. Takeover Radio's first full-time broadcasting output was achieved with the award of one of the first 15 licensed UK Pilot Access Radio stations by the (then) UK Radio Authority in 2001. This was followed by the grant of a Community Radio licence by the now current UK Government regulator Ofcom in 2005.

== History ==
Takeover Radio was the first station in the UK that gives children editorial control over their programmes and allows them to present the shows live.

The concept of Takeover Radio started in September 1996 when three children took over a Saturday night slot on a temporary radio station in Market Harborough, Leicestershire called 'Valley FM'. The station was run under the (then) Radio Authority format of a Restricted Service Licence (RSL) for short term broadcasts.

In July 2001, Charity status by the Charity's Commission took place and Takeover Radio was chosen to be one of only 15 radio stations to trial the new ccess Radio project for the Radio Authority.

On 5 March 2002, Takeover Radio was officially launched on 103.2 FM across the City of Leicester and live on the web at www.takeoverradio.com

In 2004, The Government agreed to allow the new radio regulator Ofcom to issue full-time radio licences. Takeover Radio were successful in applying for one of these, called a Community Radio License. The license was extended for another five years in 2010.

As well as the radio, "Takeover Radio" branched out into other areas. In 2003, the organisation began publishing a magazine for young people entitled Retune. The magazine gave readers further insight into the radio station and the presenters, along with information on other organisations and events specifically for young people in and around the Leicestershire. The magazine ceased publication in 2005 due to the end of funding that had previously been awarded to run the project.

In 2005, due to the redevelopment of The Shires Shopping Centre, later to become Highcross Leicester, the organisation moved its offices and studios to a new location within a local business area known as St. John's Business Park. This would be the home of Takeover Radio until March 2010, when a move to the current home of the historic Abbey Park, Leicester was completed.

In 2008, Sutton Community Academy, backed by Takeover Radio in Leicester, were successful in an application to Ofcom for a Community Radio License. The project was awarded a five-year license and went on air in January 2010, broadcasting to Sutton-in-Ashfield and surrounding areas in North Nottinghamshire on 106.9 FM.

== Core age group audience ==
Takeover Radio aims its music and programming at its core audience of 13-to-25-year-olds.

== News ==
Takeover Radio broadcasts news bulletins at 8 am, 1 pm and 5 pm on weekdays. Weather and traffic reports are broadcast throughout the day, along with news of local events.

== Massive 40 – The Ultimate UK Chart Show ==
The station is one of a number of community radio stations to broadcast The Massive 40 with Jason Scott, a Sunday chart show produced for the station by Mike Robinson, using data compiled for the UK and Ireland by DTR. The show features the Top 40 records played in full, plus has a Top 10 albums chart, a new releases chart (the Pre Order Top 5) and a look at the records just outside the Top 40 (the Sneaky Peak).

== Former presenters and daytime presenters ==
- Jim Gray (Jim Salveson) – Formerly breakfast show presenter at XFM Manchester.
- Andy May – former presenter for BBC Radio 5 Live, Newsbeat and 60 Seconds and presently presenting on 'Real Madrid TV'.
- Will Kisby – currently a producer at Classic FM and LBC
- Dylan Rana – Ex-presenter of "The Alternative", is currently the host and owner of the "dylanisfine" YouTube and Twitch channel.
- Mercedes Cotton- Ex-Presenter Saturday Mornings, BoomBox.
- Kristian Brocksopp – Ex-Presenter, currently broadcast engineer at the BBC
- Danny Hill – Ex-Presenter, currently the co-founder of The Leicester Arts Base
- Olly Mole – Current Presenter of the 'Sunday Afternoon Show' also 'Official Fun Kids Radio Reporter'

== Education centre ==
Takeover Radio offers training to children and young people aged between 8 and 24 years. Training courses usually last for 10 weeks, covering everything from production to presenting.

As well as this, Takeover Radio also has links with local education organisations and runs similar courses for children and teenagers involved in those organisations and groups.

== See also ==
- List of radio stations in the United Kingdom
