= StoryFix =

British television series

StoryFix is a television programme on United Kingdom news channel BBC News. Broadcast between May 2006 and July 2007, it was notable for presenting an alternative view of the week's news. In July 2006 it also became one of the BBC's first video podcasts.

It took a mildly satirical view of the week's events – although the satire was aimed more at the way the news was reported than at the news itself – with such features as "the week in numbers" and "good week/bad week", often picking on politicians such as John Prescott.

Emily Maitlis was the original presenter of the programme. When she went on maternity leave, Kate Silverton presented a few editions before she in turn was replaced, with Louise Minchin, Declan Curry or James Dagwell being the new regular presenters. Towards the end there was no regular presenter with a guest presenter being used for the programme, including Maryam Moshiri, Paddy O'Connell, Matt Barbet, Rory Cellan Jones, Alex Stanger, Rachel Horne, Nicola Pearson and Evan Davis.

It was available as a video podcast and on the BBC News website, as well as being shown on BBC News 24 (Fridays at 19:50, Saturdays at 13:50 amongst others) and news interactive via the red button. The editor was Mark Barlex, who is assistant editor of the BBC News at One and previously said the project was "uniquely difficult to describe".

The last episode was made available online on 27 July 2007, after it was announced a week earlier that it was to end. The BBC commented that the show was part of a video podcasting trial run by the BBC, and that the production team 'will be moving on to other projects'. Emily Maitlis returned to present the final episode (along with James Dagwell), which – at over 8 minutes – was one of the longest.

== See also ==
- BBC News
