= Patricia Goddard =

Patricia Goddard may refer to:

- Patricia Goddard (TV personality)
- Patricia Goddard (Marvel Comics), fictional character
