= Riz Lateef =

British journalist

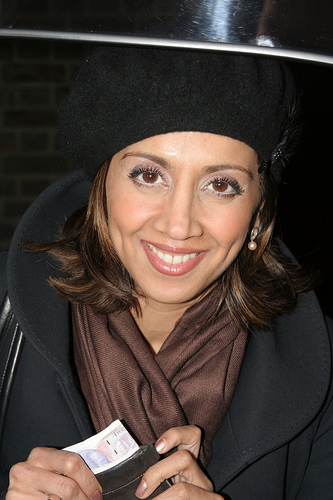
- Born: 25 September 1979 (age 47); London, England
- Occupation: BBC London Newsreader

Rizwana "Riz" Lateef is a British journalist, newsreader and deputy news manager at the BBC. She is the main presenter for the regional television news service for London, BBC London. Lateef presents the BBC London News 18:30 bulletin from Monday to Thursday and some editions of the 22:30 programme.

== Early life ==
Lateef was born in London. Her family are from Pakistan. She graduated with an MBA from Westminster Business School at the University of Westminster.

== Career ==
Lateef presented the now-defunct Friday edition of the national 20:00 Summary on BBC One.

She joined BBC London in 2003 as a reporter and occasional newsreader. Following the departure of Emily Maitlis in March 2006 to present on BBC News 24, Lateef was promoted to present the flagship 6.30pm BBC London News programme on BBC One. She was also the main anchor for the BBC London News Podcast, presented by BBC as a trial. She also presented the 60 Seconds bulletin on BBC Choice (now BBC Three) in 2002.

Previously, Lateef reported for BBC Breakfast and presented regional news for the BBC in the North East & Cumbria. She was also a guest presenter on BBC One's Holiday programme in the early half of the 2000s. She presented relief shifts on BBC News 24 in 2006, and has been a relief presenter for the BBC Weekend News on BBC One and the BBC News channel.

== Honours and awards ==
Lateef won the award for Media Professional at the Asian Women of Achievement Awards 2009 for her work on BBC London News, being one of the key figures in the coverage of the 2008 mayoral elections. The same year, she was named as one of London's '1,000 most Influential People' by the Evening Standard.

Media offices
Preceded by Ellie Crisell	Deputy Presenter of BBC News 8pm summary 2008 – 2018	Succeeded by Programme ended
