= BBC News Summary =

- Created by: BBC News
- Presented by: Ellie Crisell; Riz Lateef; Sophie Long; Sam Naz
- Country of origin: United Kingdom
- Original language: English

Production
- Production locations: Broadcasting House, London
- Running time: 90 seconds

Original release
- Network: BBC One
- Release: 8 December 1986 – 30 May 2018

Related
- BBC Breakfast; BBC News at One; BBC News at Six; BBC News at Ten

The BBC News Summary is a news update created by BBC News.

Like other BBC News bulletins it was presented by a sole newsreader, on Monday to Thursday it was usually Ellie Crisell and on Friday Riz Lateef. After a minute of brief national and international news, a regional presenter provided 30 seconds of regional news headlines and a brief local weather forecast; on BBC One HD in England a national weather forecast was broadcast instead due to there being no regional variations.

The 9:00 pm edition was a pre-recorded preview to BBC News at Ten. The 90 second bulletin was axed by the BBC on 30 May 2018. This made the news summary similar to the now defunct BBC Three's 60 Seconds, but ran for 30 seconds longer (as BBC Three has no regional continuity).

== History ==
Originally BBC news summaries were broadcast during the day, with the first use of the title being the five-minute Saturday lunchtime summary aired as part of Grandstand – Sunday's equivalent was branded as News Headlines.

The first weekday news summaries were shown as part of the BBC's new daytime TV service with the first broadcasts taking place on 8 December 1986. Lasting for approximately three minutes, the hourly or near-hourly bulletins formed the backbone of the new service. Morning summaries were broadcast on BBC1 and early afternoon summaries were transmitted at 2pm, 3pm and 3.50 pm on BBC2, although the timing of the 3pm and 3.50 pm updates could vary slightly, usually on days when horse racing coverage was being shown, and the 2pm bulletin was a 60-second read-through of the headlines and did not feature any reports. Each bulletin was followed by a weather forecast and the final afternoon news summary of the day was followed by the mid-afternoon regional news bulletin, which had previously been shown at approximately the same time on BBC1.

In October 1990, regional hourly news bulletins started to be broadcast immediately after the BBC1 morning summaries. By the end of the 1990s the summaries were broadcast less frequently and they were phased out altogether during the 2000s.

These summaries are not to be confused with generic BBC News bulletins broadcast over BBC One and BBC Two at weekends and holidays.

=== BBC One 8 pm News Summary ===
In May 2007, Natasha Kaplinsky and Suzanne Virdee presented a new peaktime summary during its initial pilot in the Midlands. The intention was originally to target the young, professional and working markets. It was broadcast on weeknights at 8:00 pm on BBC One.

In October 2007, Natasha Kaplinsky left BBC News, and Kate Silverton was announced as the launch presenter. Initially, the presenter of the BBC News at Six or BBC News at Ten presented Friday editions, but Ellie Crisell later became the Friday presenter.

In February 2008, Silverton left the update to present BBC News at One and was replaced by Crisell, who took maternity leave the following month. During this time Riz Lateef and Celina Hinchcliffe presented the update, while others including Sophie Long and Luisa Baldini also appeared.

On 21 April 2008, the summary got a new logo and graphics as part of a BBC News relaunch. In October 2008 Crisell returned to the update. Riz Lateef became the new Friday and relief presenter.

On 18 March 2013, the programme moved to Broadcasting House, along with the BBC News Channel and the other BBC One bulletins, and began broadcasting in high-definition.

The final BBC One 8 pm News Summary was aired on 30 May 2018.

== Final presenters (BBC One 8 pm News Summary) ==
Main presenter of the networked 8 pm bulletin – Ellie Crisell – left the summary for South East Today and since then multiple presenters hosted in a rotation, consisting of:

Monday & Tuesday:

- Alice Bhandhukravi (Relief presenter, 2015–2018)
- Victoria Hollins (Relief presenter, 2015–2018)

Wednesday:

- Tina Daheley (presenter, 2016–2018)

Thursday (alternating):

- Sophie Long (presenter, 2008–2018)
- Elaine Dunkley (presenter, 2015–2018)
- Sangita Myska (presenter, 2015–2018)

Friday:

- Sima Kotecha (presenter, 2015–2018)

== Regional presenters ==
The BBC One English Regions had their own teams of presenters rotating throughout each week in a similar fashion, including the Look East TV region consisting of both BBC One East (East) and BBC One East (West).

=== Former National 8 pm News Summary presenters ===
If there is no position before the years of being a presenter, this newsreader was either a relief presenter or occasional stand-in presenter.

- Natasha Kaplinsky (Main presenter during trial period, 2007)
- Luisa Baldini (2007–2008)
- Maryam Moshiri (2008–2009)
- Celina Hinchcliffe (Main presenter, 2008–2012)
- George Alagiah (2008–2013)
- Fiona Bruce (2008–2013)
- Sian Williams (2012–2013)
- Sophie Raworth (2009–2013)
- Kate Silverton (Main presenter, 2007)
- Ellie Crisell (Main presenter, 2008–2015)
- Riz Lateef (2008–13)

== See also ==
- 60 Seconds
- BBC News
