= Tazeen Ahmad =

British journalist (1971–2019)

- Ahmad in 2017
- Born: 16 October 1971; Karachi, Pakistan
- Died: 6 November 2019 (aged 48)
- Occupation: Reporter
- Notable credits: NBC News; BBC Radio 4; BBC Radio 5 Live; Channel 4's Dispatches
- Children: 2

Farah Tazeen Ahmad (13 October 1971 – 6 November 2019) was a news reporter for both American and British television. She was a foreign correspondent for NBC News and an investigative journalist for Channel 4's current affairs show Dispatches. After working six months undercover she wrote (The Checkout Girl, 2009). Tazeen Ahmad also worked for newspapers.

== Early life and education ==
Ahmad was born in Karachi, Pakistan to two academics, Shaher (née Bano) and Waheed Ahmad. Her parents' career took the family to Port Harcourt, Nigeria in 1974 and then Edgware, north London in 1981. She attended Little Stanmore middle school, Middlesex, and St Margaret's School, Bushey, in Hertfordshire. Outside her English home, Ahmad experienced what she described as "chronic racism." By the time she was 14, her parents had separated and she spent three years in Islamabad with her father before returning to Britain in 1988. She completed her A Levels at Weald College, Harrow, followed by a media and communications degree at the Barking campus of the University of East London.

== Career ==
After graduating, Ahmad joined BBC Radio and then worked as a freelance for ITN. Ahmad was a broadcaster, journalist and writer who presented and reported for programmes on radio and television in news and current affairs in television and radio, working for the American NBC network, Channel 4 and the BBC 5 Live and on Radio 4 as well as the World Service.

She also reported during BBC One's Election night coverage, a presenter of 60 Seconds and The 7 O'Clock News on BBC Three.

The documentaries Ahmad made for Channel 4's Dispatches programme included investigations into sex gangs in the UK, exposés on the world of fashion, credit cards and the cosmetics industry, as well as British schools. The 2013 programme The Hunt for Britain's Sex Gangs for Dispatches, about sex gangs active in Telford won a Royal Television Society award and the Asian Media Award for Best Investigation, and was nominated for a BAFTA. The Hunt for Britain's Sex Gangs was a follow-up to a 2011 documentary which was also for Dispatches, about sex gangs in Northern England and the North Midlands, titled Britain's Sex Gangs. After a Dispatches programme in 2011 titled Lessons in Hate and Violence, which showed undercover footage of violence against children in a Keighley mosque, a teacher was imprisoned. She also reported for the BBC's Inside Out.

Ahmad's book, The Checkout Girl, was published in August 2009 by The Friday Project/HarperCollins. Over six months, she worked 'undercover' as a checkout assistant in English supermarkets.

Ahmad was the founder and director of EQ Matters, an emotional intelligence consultancy.

== Death ==
Ahmad died after struggling with cancer on 6 November 2019, aged 48.
