= Sky Midnight News =

Television news programme, broadcast on Sky News

- Genre: News
- Presented by: Various
- Opening theme: Sky News theme
- Country of origin: United Kingdom

Production
- Production location: Studio 6, Sky Studios
- Camera setup: Multi-camera
- Running time: 180 Minutes (12:00am-03:00am)

Original release
- Network: Sky News
- Release: 2010 – present

Sky Midnight News is a news strand that airs every day on Sky News and on Sky News HD in the UK. The first 30–35 minutes of each hour features a round-up of the news stories and a look ahead to the morning news. The back half hour is typically filled by a re-transmission of the previous evening's The Wrap.

== Broadcasts ==
On weekdays, the format is used from midnight until 3 am and is followed by Sky World News. The slot is regularly presented by Kimberley Leonard. On weekends, the 2 am-3 am hour is usually filled by a documentary.

The Midnight News was once a 30-minute newscast branded individually from other hours in the schedule and was the only news programme in its time slot in the UK, however the programme now falls under general Sky News branding.

== Presenters ==
Since joining Sky News in 2015, Kimberley Leonard is the primary anchor for the programme, typically anchoring most Monday-Thursday programmes. However, since December 2020, following wider Sky News presenter movements, Leonard has been absent from the slot whilst covering other programmes across the weekday and weekend schedule.

Presenter	Title
Kimberley Leonard	Main Presenter; Currently Absent
Vanessa Baffoe	Presenter (Rotating)
Sam Naz	Presenter (Rotating)
Nick Quraishi	Relief Presenter (Weekdays)
Belle Donati	Relief Presenter (Weekdays)
Barry Weir	Relief Presenter (Weekends)

Preceded by N/A	Sky News weekday schedule 00:00–05:00	Succeeded by The Early Rundown
