= The 7 O'Clock News =

British news programmme (2003–2005)

- Also known as: The News Show; BBC3 News
- Created by: BBC News
- Presented by: Julian Worricker; Sangita Myska; Tazeen Ahmad; Eddie Mair; Paddy O'Connell; James Dagwell; Ben McCarthy; Sevan Bastajian
- Country of origin: United Kingdom
- Original language: English

Production
- Production locations: Studio TC11, BBC Television Centre, London
- Running time: 15 minutes (2003–2004); 30 minutes (2004–2005)

Original release
- Network: BBC Three
- Release: 10 February 2003 – 2 December 2005

Related
- 60 Seconds; Liquid News

The 7 O'Clock News is a British news programme. It was the main news programme broadcast each weekday at 7:00 pm, on British digital television channel BBC Three from 10 February 2003 to 2 December 2005. Originally called The News Show from its launch on 10 February 2003, the night after the launch of BBC Three, it was rebranded later in the year, though retaining the same presentation team.

== History ==
=== Pre-launch ===
As a condition of approval for the launch of BBC Three, the station had to carry an early evening nightly news programme, in addition to the 60 Seconds bulletins and Liquid News that had been carried on BBC Choice, the channel's predecessor.

The News Show was first revealed as the programme title in September 2002, and the primary presenter was confirmed in January 2003 as Julian Worricker, who had joined from BBC Radio 5 Live's breakfast show which he had left the month prior. Alongside him were Tazeen Ahmad and Sangita Myska. It was also announced the programme would broadcast on weeknights at 7:45 pm.

=== The News Show ===
The programme premiered on 10 February 2003, the night after BBC Three's launch, with Julian Worricker and Tazeen Ahmad presenting the first edition. Julian Worricker was replaced on the programme in April by Ben McCarthy with Worricker returning to 5 Live in July, as the mid-morning presenter.

Just two months after the programme's launch, it found itself in a difficult situation as it was reported ratings for The News Show were so low that BARB registered the programme as having no viewers during the Iraq war.

=== The 7 O'Clock News ===
As part of a schedule change on 7 July 2003, the programme was moved to the 7:00 pm timeslot and rebranded as The 7 O'Clock News, it became the first programme to broadcast on BBC Three each evening after CBBC went off-air. Liquid News was moved to 8:00 pm on the same evening, having previously run in said timeslot.

It was announced in January 2004 that The 7 O'Clock News would be retooled sometime that year as a half-hour programme intended to become BBC Three's early evening equivalent to Newsnight, the nightly current affairs programme broadcast on BBC Two. It was announced in March 2004 that PM presenter Eddie Mair would present the relaunched programme.

The relaunched version of The 7 O'Clock News with Mair was launched on 10 May 2004. In addition to the new presenter and extended runtime, there was also a new logo and a larger studio set.

A report into the BBC's digital output authored by Professor Patrick Barwise released in October 2004 was highly critical of the programme, saying that it "achieves nothing and attracts tiny audiences" and that it should be replaced by new science, current affairs and business programmes.

For two weeks starting on 14 March 2005, The 7 O'Clock News was moved to a new timeslot, 8:30 pm, and was temporarily rebranded as BBC3 News, in order for the satirical show The Comic Side of 7 Days and episodes of Liquid Assets (a spin-off from Liquid News, which was cancelled the previous year), to fill the 7:00 pm slot during the two-week period. After this period ended, the programme returned to 7:00 pm and reverted to its previous title.

=== Cancellation ===
On 21 October 2005, the BBC announced that The 7 O'Clock News had been cancelled and would broadcast its final edition at the end of the year. This was caused by the heavy criticism of the programme in the Barwise report and the BBC's own research undertaken earlier that year. Stuart Murphy, the BBC Three controller, said the show had "fought its corner" against "intense competition". He resigned from the role of BBC Three controller the day before the programme was cancelled.

The last edition of The 7 O'Clock News was broadcast on 2 December 2005, and was replaced by "high quality factual programming" for 2006. BBC Three continued to provide news output with 60 Seconds which continued until the linear channel closed and moved online in February 2016. Since its return to linear television in 2022, BBC Three's news output consists of a short-form youth-oriented bulletin known as The Catch Up.

== Format ==
Compared to the rest of the BBC News output, The 7 O'Clock News had a completely different image and style of presentation, with a turquoise colour scheme in contrast to the standard red and black.

When the programme was launched as The News Show in 2003, it was presented as a straight news bulletin with a fast-paced 15-minute format, and could be compared to Newsbeat on BBC Radio 1. This format was retained when the programme was rebranded later in the year.

After the programme relaunched to The 7 O'Clock News in May 2004, the programme went in a different direction. It noticeably became more relaxed and even satirical than the previous version, and was comparable to the then-recently cancelled Liquid News. This could be because of Mair's role as chief presenter, whose offbeat style had been popular on BBC Radio 4's PM. Presenters began bulletins standing but ended seated, reviewing the newspapers towards the end of the programme.

== Presenters ==
- Julian Worricker (2003)
- Sangita Myska (2003–2004)
- Tazeen Ahmad (2003–2005)
- Eddie Mair (2004–2005)
- Sevan Bastajian (2003–2005)
- Ben McCarthy (2003–2005)
- James Dagwell (2003–2005)
- Paddy O'Connell (2004–2005)

Cover presenters for the programme included Susannah Streeter, Chris Eakin and Guto Harri.

== See also ==
- BBC News
- 60 Seconds
- Liquid News
