= Matt Cooke (journalist) =

British journalist

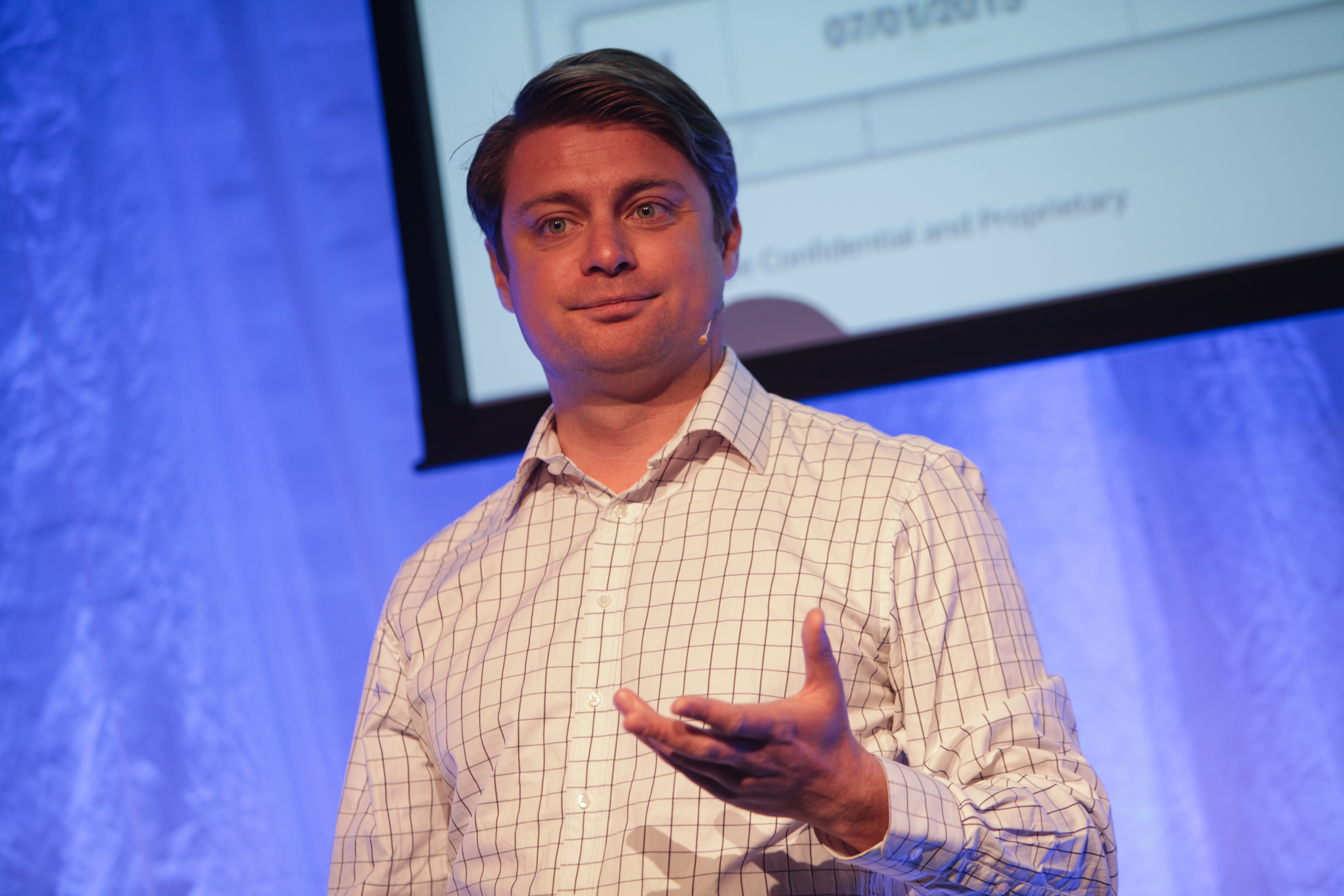
- Image of Matt Cooke
- Born: London, United Kingdom
- Occupations: Journalist, Presenter, Producer
- Notable credit(s): BBC Three, BBC London, BBC Midlands Today

Matt Cooke (born 1982 in Kingston-upon-Thames) is a British journalist who worked for BBC News reporting for BBC London News, BBC Midlands Today, and presenting 60 Seconds on BBC Three. He now works at Google.

== Early life ==
Matt Cooke was born in London and grew up in Guildford, Surrey.

Graduating from university in 2004, Cooke attended the University of Plymouth as an undergraduate, then the London College of Printing to undertake a post-graduate diploma in Broadcast Journalism.

== Career ==
=== Broadcasting ===
Cooke joined the BBC in 2005 as a researcher at the Westminster studios, here he worked on the Local Elections programme and the BBC Parliament channel.

Later that year he joined BBC London News as a producer and eventually was deployed as a video journalist.

In March 2008, Cooke was chosen to present the relaunched BBC Three news bulletins. Matt continues to present '60 Seconds' as well as regularly presenting E24, the Entertainment bulletins on the BBC News Channel.

In late 2008, Cooke co-presented Your News with Konnie Huq for the BBC News Channel.

In January 2009, Matt Cooke was criticised in The Daily Telegraph for filming pedestrians falling over on icy stairs at Waterloo station for BBC London News. Later that same year he was again criticised in The Daily Telegraph for a report on Apple's iPhone for BBC Midlands Today.

In March 2009, Cooke relocated to the West Midlands to join BBC Midlands Today as a reporter and presenter. He presented the Breakfast, 8pm and Late bulletins on BBC One. He presented 60 Seconds and E24 in London. He returned to report at 'BBC London News' in 2010 until departing the BBC in 2011.

=== Google ===
In 2011, Cooke joined Google where he now leads a global team working with journalists to help strengthen digital skills, collaborate on industry challenges, and support innovation in the newsroom. The News Lab forms part of the Google News Initiative, an effort to work with the news industry to help journalism "thrive in the digital age." During this time he’s led multiple election projects focusing on fact-checking initiatives, data journalism and broadcast partnerships. Matt was the first member of the News Lab outside the U.S., and launched Europe’s first News Lab Fellowship; he was also responsible for partnerships including The Royal Family’s first experiment with interactive livestreams.
