= Holiday (TV series) =

British TV travel series (1969–2007)

- Genre: Travel
- Presented by: Cliff Michelmore; Desmond Lynam; Anne Gregg; John Carter; Kathy Tayler; Anneka Rice; Jill Dando; Craig Doyle; Riz Lateef; Laurence Llewelyn-Bowen
- Country of origin: United Kingdom
- Original language: English
- No. of episodes: 622

Production
- Running time: 29 minutes

Original release
- Network: BBC One; BBC Two
- Release: 2 January 1969 – 19 March 2007

Holiday is a British television programme, which aired mainly on BBC One, and sometimes on BBC Two. It is the longest running travel review series on UK television, showing every year from 1969 until its demise in 2007.

== Overview ==
The programme began in 1969 as Holiday 69, and until the early 2000s the year was included in the title in this way. The first presenter was Cliff Michelmore, who remained with the series until 1986. In 1974, competitor network ITV launched its own travel show, Wish You Were Here...?, which ran until 2003.

Each week the programme consisted of reports made by presenters visiting holiday resorts and destinations in both the UK or overseas. The locations would be reviewed based on criteria such as amenities, attractions, and hospitality. Despite the programme's interesting locations and resorts, it garnered a reputation for featuring destinations that the majority of viewers would be unable to afford.

The programme spawned several short-lived offshoot programmes, including:

- Summer Holiday (1994–2002)
- Holidays Out (1995–1998)
- Holiday: Fasten Your Seatbelt (1996–98), in which presenters tried out holiday-related jobs)
- Holiday on a Shoestring (1999)
- Holiday Snaps (1999–2002)
- Holiday: You Call the Shots – in which viewers advised the presenters which sites to visit in a particular destination prior to filming (2001–03)

It was announced by the BBC in November 2006 that after 37 years and 40 series, Holiday would end in March 2007 at the conclusion of its current run.

== Presenters ==
Many presenters appeared in the programme, including Cliff Michelmore, Ginny Buckley, Joan Bakewell, Anne Gregg, Frank Bough, Des Lynam, Eamonn Holmes, Anneka Rice, Richard Whiteley, Trevor Nelson, Jill Dando, Rizwana Lateef, Craig Doyle and Nana Akua.

In addition, the teams of reporters who provided regular reviews from holiday destinations included Sarah Kennedy, Bill Buckley, Kieran Prendiville, Fyfe Robertson, Kathy Tayler, Monty Don, Rowland Rivron, John Cole and Carol Smillie. The final presenter was Laurence Llewelyn-Bowen.

== Theme tunes ==
The original theme tune for the series was Love's "The Castle".

Subsequent theme tunes in the mid-1970s included Hugo Montenegro's arrangement of Lalo Schifrin's theme to the 1968 movie The Fox, a cover of the Beatles song "Here Comes the Sun", and Part One of Jean Michel Jarre's Equinoxe.

Gordon Giltrap's "Heartsong" was used as a theme tune from 1978 until the end of the 1985 series. In 1986 it was replaced with "The Holiday Suite" written by Simon May, who also composed the EastEnders theme. This proved unpopular, and was replaced on Holiday '87 by a further Giltrap composition "Breaking Free" which also only lasted one year. For Holiday '88-'91 they used a third Giltrap composition "Holiday Romance".

In 1992 Paul Hardcastle composed a new theme, titled "Voyager". This theme was used throughout the 1990s and 2000s until the programme came to an end after 37 years in 2007.

== Transmissions ==
=== Holiday ===
Series	Start date	End date	Episodes
1	2 January 1969	3 April 1969	14
2	4 January 1970	5 April 1970	14
3	27 November 1970	5 February 1971	10
4	4 November 1971	20 January 1972	12
5	7 December 1972	8 February 1973	10
6	3 January 1974	14 March 1974	10
7	30 December 1974	4 March 1975	10
8	4 January 1976	14 March 1976	10
9	2 January 1977	20 February 1977	8
10	1 January 1978	19 February 1978	8
11	31 December 1978	18 February 1979	8
12	30 December 1979	2 March 1980	10
13	4 January 1981	8 March 1981	10
14	3 January 1982	28 March 1982	13
15	2 January 1983	27 March 1983	13
16	1 January 1984	25 March 1984	13
17	30 December 1984	24 March 1985	13
18	7 January 1986	29 April 1986	17
19	6 January 1987	28 April 1987	17
20	5 January 1988	5 April 1988	14
21	5 January 1989	6 April 1989	14
22	2 January 1990	3 April 1990	14
23	8 January 1991	9 April 1991	14
24	7 January 1992	7 April 1992	14
25	5 January 1993	6 April 1993	14
26	16 November 1993	5 April 1994	20
27	1 November 1994	4 April 1995	21
28	31 October 1995	23 April 1996	24
29	24 September 1996	15 April 1997	26
30	21 October 1997	7 April 1998	25
31	13 October 1998	13 April 1999	23
32	19 October 1999	21 December 1999	10
33	24 October 2000	19 December 2000	10
34	15 October 2001	10 December 2001	9
35	28 October 2002	16 December 2002	8
36	20 October 2003	15 December 2003	9
37	18 October 2004	20 December 2004	9
38	31 October 2005	19 December 2005	7
39	2 October 2006	18 December 2006	12
40	10 January 2007	19 March 2007	10

=== Holiday Quiz ===
Series	Start date	End date	Episodes
1	27 December 1988	2 January 1989	6

=== Summer Holiday ===
Series	Start date	End date	Episodes
1	31 May 1994	12 July 1994	7
2	27 June 1995	15 August 1995	8
3	11 June 1996	18 July 1996	6
4	10 June 1997	22 July 1997	7
5	26 May 1998	14 July 1998	8
6	25 May 1999	24 August 1999	14
7	6 June 2000	5 September 2000	13
8	12 June 2001	28 August 2001	12
9	24 June 2002	5 August 2002	6

=== Holiday: Fasten Your Seatbelt ===
Series	Start date	End date	Episodes
Special	10 December 1996		1
1	29 April 1997	3 June 1997	6
2	14 April 1998	19 May 1998	6
Specials	22 December 1998	20 April 1999	2

=== Holiday Heaven ===
Series	Start date	End date	Episodes
1	1 September 1998	6 October 1998	6

=== Holiday Memories ===
Celebrity Holiday Memories in 1999

Series	Start date	End date	Episodes
1	9 September 1997	14 October 1997	6
2	7 September 1999	12 October 1999	6

=== Holiday Guide to.... ===
Series	Start date	End date	Episodes
1	31 January 1999	21 February 1999	4
2	7 November 1999	19 December 1999	6
3	22 October 2000	25 February 2001	8
4	23 June 2002	1 September 2002	5

=== Holiday on a Shoestring ===
Series	Start date	End date	Episodes
1	24 February 1999	14 April 1999	6
2	11 April 2000	30 May 2000	9
3	17 April 2001	9 September 2001	8
4	29 April 2002	28 August 2002	8

=== Holiday Swaps ===
Series	Start date	End date	Episodes
Special	12 April 1999		1
1	21 January 2000	10 March 2000	8
Special	24 December 2000		1
2	10 May 2001	28 June 2001	8
3	5 January 2003	23 February 2003	6

=== Holiday: You Call the Shots ===
Series	Start date	End date	Episodes
1	4 September 2001	16 October 2001	6
Special	17 December 2001		1
2	2 September 2002	21 October 2002	8
3	2 June 2003	30 June 2003	5
4	15 September 2003	13 October 2003	5

=== Specials ===
Date	Entitle
27 August 1998	Vets on Holiday
5 January 1999	Holiday Down Under
15 October 2000	Round-the-World Special
22 December 2002	EastEnders Special
