= Tasmin Lucia-Khan =

British film producer, television personality, news anchor and entrepreneur (born 1980)

- Born: Farhana Tasmin Lucia-Khan; 18 July 1980 (age 46); London, England
- Education: Politics, philosophy and economics
- Alma mater: University of Oxford
- Occupations: Journalist, television presenter, news presenter, producer
- Years active: 1999–present
- Notable credit(s): Zee TV; Channel 5 BBC News; ITV Breakfast

Tasmin Lucia-Khan (born 18 July 1980) is a British film producer, television personality, news anchor and entrepreneur. In the UK, she is most known for being the face of BBC Three 60 Seconds, hosting E24 on BBC News, and fronting the morning news for ITV Breakfast show Daybreak. She was appointed CEO of Hollywood film company WR Entertainment in 2016 and subsequently took the company public on the Oslo Stock Exchange Merkur Market.

== Early life ==
Born Farhana Tasmin Lucia-Khan in London, she is of Bengali descent. Khan graduated from the University of Oxford with an Honours degree in politics, philosophy and economics.

== Media career ==
In 1999, Khan started her career at Zee TV Network as an entertainment presenter and news reporter. She then hosted her own talk show interviewing celebrities from music and film, sports and politics. In 2001, she interviewed Bill Clinton a few months after he completed his second term as President of the United States.

She worked as a radio presenter for the BBC Asian Network, covering programmes like the Breakfast Show, Drive Time and The Album Chart. She was on air when news of the Indian Ocean earthquake and tsunami broke on Boxing Day in December 2004.

She then worked for PTV Prime as London correspondent where she reported the UK's big news stories to a worldwide audience including the 7 July 2005 London bombings and the Ipswich serial murders in 2006.

Having produced and hosted her own sports show on Channel 5 for three years, she then landed the opportunity to present on BBC News and BBC Three. One of her mentors was Kevin Bakhurst who was the Editor of the Ten O’Clock News on BBC, and moved on to be the Controller of BBC News. Bakhurst and Danny Cohen, then controller of BBC Three, offered her the job to be the face of the news bulletins on 60 Seconds on BBC Three, and be lead anchor of E24 on BBC News.

On 6 September 2010, she joined the ITV Breakfast programme Daybreak after being headhunted from the BBC to be the sole news anchor covering all major world news stories as well as domestic, political and economic stories from the UK. She led the news teams through the 2011 London Riots, the uprisings in Egypt, Libya and Syria, and broke the news of the death of Osama bin Laden.

She left ITV News and morning TV in 2012 to pursue other opportunities in America after 15 years on UK television. From 2013 onwards, she was on US television as NBC Extra's 'Special Correspondent' conducting celebrity interviews, and both entertainment and news stories ranging from the birth of the royal babies in the UK to red carpet coverage of major film premieres.

In January 2016, she was appointed CEO of Film company WR Entertainment, a publicly traded company that had acquired the motion-picture rights to all 83 books in the Morgan Kane best selling book series which had sold over 20 million copies worldwide. In April 2016, she raised $3.5 million in working capital for the film company from the likes of Norwegian billionaires Bjørn Kjos and Arne Blystad. The first movie from the Morgan Kane film franchise was planned to start filming in 2016, but no news of any production dates has been announced yet.

== Other activities ==
Khan hosted the 2010 Commonwealth Games 'Queens Baton Relay' at Buckingham Palace, alongside Queen Elizabeth II and the President of India, to launch the baton on its journey to Delhi for the 2010 Games.

She has hosted the annual BCA Gala Awards ceremony every year from 2007 to 2015, and the Scottish Asian Business Awards in Glasgow in 2008 and 2009.

In May and June 2009, she was part of a delegation to Bangladesh, organised by the British Government's Foreign Office as part of their Counter Terrorism strategy.

== Personal life ==
Khan now lives in Los Angeles, United States. She is married to cardiologist Dr Junaid Zaman.

== See also ==
- British Bangladeshi
- List of British Bangladeshis
