= Thinking man's crumpet =

Humorous slang term

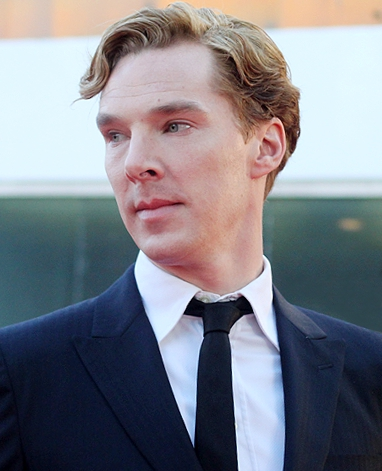
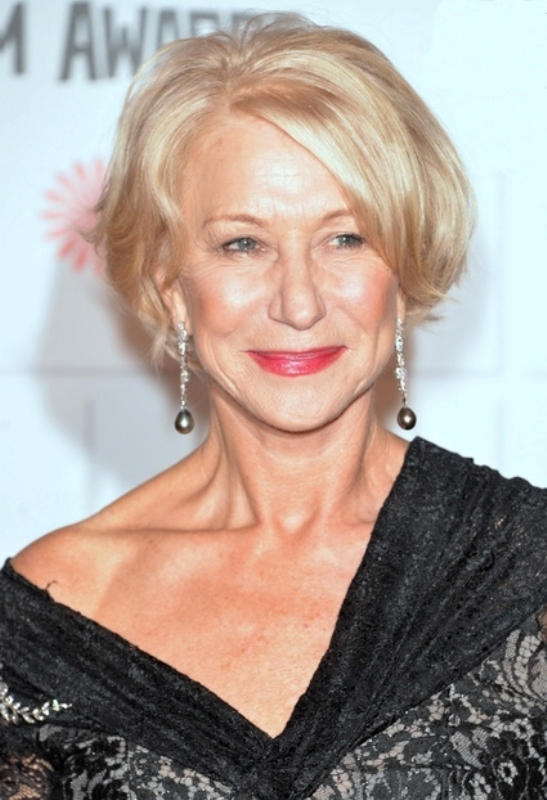
Benedict Cumberbatch (left) and Helen Mirren (right) have been described as "thinking woman's crumpet" and "thinking man's crumpet" respectively.

In British English, the thinking man's crumpet or thinking woman's crumpet is a humorous term for a person who is popular with the opposite sex because of their intelligence and their physical attractiveness.

The expression is derived from the slang use of the term "crumpet" to refer to a woman who is regarded as an object of sexual desire.

== Usage ==
The first person to be called "the thinking man's crumpet" was Joan Bakewell, by humourist Frank Muir, following her appearances in highbrow television discussion programmes such as BBC2's Late Night Line-Up. Bakewell is still synonymous with the phrase, but it has subsequently been applied to other high-profile women such as Anne Gregg, Joanna Lumley, Kate Bush and Felicity Kendal, and, more recently, Helen Mirren, Lucy Worsley and Gillian Anderson. In a poll in the Radio Times in 2003, Nigella Lawson received the most votes to be the readers' "thinking man's crumpet".

Almost half a century after Muir deployed the term, Bakewell (by then Baroness Bakewell and a Dame Commander of the British Empire) remarked that "it has taken me a lifetime to live it down. It was meant as a compliment I suppose, but it was a little bit of a put-down".

Actors Benedict Cumberbatch, Colin Firth and Bill Nighy have been called "the thinking woman's crumpet" by the press.

Comedian Sam Campbell described fellow competitor Mathew Baynton as "the thinking woman's crumpet" during the 4th Champion of Champion's episode of Taskmaster (TV series).

After the release of the 1997 film Titanic, Kate Winslet was dubbed by one newspaper as "the sinking man's crumpet".

Stewart Lee called Andrew Graham-Dixon "the crumpet man's thinker."
