= After Nine =

1985 UK television programme

After Nine is a women's lifestyle programme on the former broadcaster TV-am in the United Kingdom. After Nine ran from 1985 until 18 December 1992, prior to TV-am ending broadcasting at the end of 1992, airing from 09.00 until 09.25 during term time - children's programmes were broadcast during school holidays - and it finished the day's broadcasting for TV-am. It covered topics such as fashion and health, and generally finished with a workout by Lizzie Webb, the station's fitness expert.

It was originally was presented by Jayne Irving, and latterly by Kathy Tayler.

On 1 November 1988, TV-am's After Nine had 1.8 million viewers. The main topic discussed by fashion expert Merrill Thomas was "flattering the fuller figure", which had a mixed reception from diarists watching the segment.
