= Sam Naz =

British news presenter

- Born: Samreen Naz; Birmingham, England
- Education: Leeds University
- Occupations: News presenter, actor, journalist
- Notable credits: 60 Seconds; BBC News; Sky News; Liberté

Samreen "Sam" Naz is a British television presenter, actress and screenwriter currently working as a news presenter for Sky News in London. She has previously hosted several programmes including 60 Seconds. She wrote, produced and starred in a short film called Liberté (2021), in which she played the lead role of Noor Inayat Khan, a secret agent working for Britain's Special Operations Executive (SOE) during the Second World War.

== Early life and education ==
Naz was born and brought up in Birmingham, England. She studied Economics and Politics at the University of Leeds. In 2002, she was awarded a bursary from the George Viner Memorial Fund, an initiative by the National Union of Journalists to broaden the diversity of journalists in the media.

== Career ==
In 2010 she became the main presenter of BBC Three's 60 Seconds, anchoring the bulletins from Mondays to Thursdays. She also co-hosted BBC Three's live political discussion programme Free Speech. Naz joined the line-up at Sky News in 2016. She also chaired a special Media Summits event about Brexit in 2017, which featured Ed Vaizey.

Sam Naz has been a regular anchor of the overnight and early morning coverage on Sky News since 2016, typically being on air from midnight til 6am presenting Sky Midnight News and Sky World News. As of 2021, she has been the most frequent presenter of this slot. Naz was brought in to launch Euronews Tonight in 2018 as part of the NBC News partnership with European network Euronews.

Naz wrote, produced and starred in a short film called Liberté, in which she played the lead role of Noor Inayat Khan, a Muslim secret agent working for Britain's Special Operations Executive (SOE) during the Second World War. The film premiered in Los Angeles in September 2021 and was released by Sky in the UK and The History Channel globally in February 2023.

== Credits ==
=== Television ===
Year	Title	Role	Notes
2011–2016	60 Seconds	Presenter	BBC Three
2012	Free Speech	Social Media Jockey	BBC Three
2013–2016	8pm News Summary	Presenter	BBC One
Since 2016	Sky News	News Anchor	Sky
2016–2018	Channel 5 News	News Anchor/Reporter	ITN Productions
2016	Berlin Station	BBC Commentator (acting role)	Paramount
2018	Euronews Tonight	Host	NBC
2021	COBRA	Broadcaster (acting role)	Sky
2022	The Fear Index	TV News Anchor (acting role)	Sky
2023	Alice & Jack	Reporter (acting role)	Channel 4

=== Film ===
Year	Title	Role	Notes
2021	Liberté	Noor Inayat Khan	Actor, writer, producer
2021	Red Sandra	World News Anchor	Actor
