= Last Word =

BBC radio obituary series

- Genre: Factual
- Running time: 28 minutes
- Country of origin: England
- Language: English
- Home station: BBC Radio 4
- Hosted by: Matthew Bannister
- Original release: 10 February 2006 – present
- Website: BBC website page

Last Word is a radio obituary series broadcast weekly on BBC Radio 4. Each week, the lives of recently deceased famous people are summarised with narration and interviews with people who knew them. It is normally presented by Matthew Bannister, although occasionally it has been presented by others, including Kate Silverton and Julian Worricker.

The programme was first broadcast on 10 February 2006. On 29 September 2006, a biography of American songwriter Paul Vance (1929–2022) was broadcast, including an interview with Vance himself, after his death was announced in the media by mistake.
