= Anne Gregg =

Travel writer and TV presenter

- Born: Anne Deirdre Gregg; 11 February 1940; Belfast, Northern Ireland
- Died: 5 September 2006 (aged 66); London
- Occupation(s): Television presenter, travel writer

Anne Deirdre Gregg (11 February 1940 – 5 September 2006) was a travel writer and TV presenter from Northern Ireland. She is perhaps best known for presenting the BBC's travel programme Holiday throughout the 1980s. She was one of the first people from Northern Ireland to become a national British television personality.

== Early life ==
Gregg was born in Belfast. Her father, Kenneth, was a civil servant who worked for the Ordnance Survey; her mother, Nan, was a dressmaker. A great uncle, R. H. McCandless, was an actor. She had one brother, Ken.

Gregg was educated at Strathearn Grammar School for Girls in Belfast. After leaving school, she worked for a short time as a bookkeeper in the Ministry of Finance, but quickly left to pursue a television career.

== Career ==
Gregg joined Ulster Television at the age of 19 in 1959, starting as an announcer and later becoming a local news reporter and presenter of Roundabout. She was reputed to be the youngest current affairs presenter in the United Kingdom. She moved to England in 1963, where she worked at an advertising agency before moving to Anglia Television, in Norwich, to present a current affairs programme. She moved to London to work for the BBC, first as a continuity announcer, and later becoming a news reader on national television.

She changed to print journalism in 1966, working as a features editor and later deputy editor on the Good Housekeeping magazine. She was editor of Woman's Journal from 1978 to 1980.

Gregg returned to television broadcasting in 1980, as a presenter on the Holiday programme from 1980 to 1991. She was its main studio presenter from 1990 to 1991, attracting a weekly audience of 12 million. With a warm, personable manner, described by The Guardian as "unstuffy directness and warmth combined with an impish sense of fun", she was popular with viewers.

She was counted as "thinking man's crumpet", alongside Joan Bakewell, Joanna Lumley and Felicity Kendal. However, in 1991, she was replaced as the main presenter of Holiday with Anneka Rice (Rice was herself replaced one year later by Jill Dando). Rather than face demotion, Gregg resigned. The Daily Mail reported that she had been dismissed, and perceptions that she had been rejected for being too old at 51 (Rice was 17½ years younger) led to hundreds of viewers writing in to protest, pushing the issue of her departure to seventh on the BBC's list of viewer complaints, between complaints about bad language (sixth) and about a series of programmes on homosexuality on BBC2 (eighth). Gregg, however, rejected allegations of ageism, pointing to successful older women at the BBC, such as Esther Rantzen and Sue Lawley.

In retrospect, Gregg was glad to have been given a chance to explore other interests. She continued as a television presenter. She co-presented coverage of the Chelsea Flower Show for BBC Two from 1991 to 1994; presented a ten-part series on BBC Northern Ireland, Places Apart in 1996–1997; and appeared as a guest on Call My Bluff and Countdown. She presented two programmes that mixed travel with religion, Annie Across America on religion in the United States, in 1992 and Package Pilgrims in 1993; and also Folio, an arts programme produced by Anglia.

Gregg also continued with the freelance interests that she had pursued while presenting Holiday. She produced videos for English Heritage; she wrote in newspapers and magazines; and she appeared on radio programmes. In 1997, she presented one series of Breakaway on BBC Radio 4.

For many years, she produced magazines for the French Tourist Office in London with business partner Ken Wright. In 2003, she was awarded the Médaille d'Or du Tourisme. She wrote several books, including The Perfect Holiday (1989), Dalton's Directory of British Holidays (1993), a series of Heritage Guides to Great Britain (1995), and Tarragon and Truffles (2006).

== Personal life ==
Gregg lived in London, but also kept a house in Provence. She never married. She died in 2006 of cancer, aged 66.
