= 60 Seconds =

British news programme

- 60 Seconds logo used from 2008 to 2016
- Created by: BBC News
- Country of origin: United Kingdom
- Original language: English

Production
- Production locations: Broadcasting House, London
- Running time: 1 minute

Original release
- Network: BBC Choice (2001–2003); BBC Three (2003–2016)
- Release: 16 July 2001 – 16 February 2016

Related
- The 7 O'Clock News; Liquid News

60 Seconds is a short-news programme which ran between shows on BBC Three and its predecessor BBC Choice. It was broadcast under the BBC News format and branding. The presenters included Tasmin Lucia-Khan, Andy May, Matt Cooke, James Dagwell, Claudia-Liza Vanderpuije and Sam Naz. The programme was similar to the BBC News Summary that aired on BBC One, also broadcast under the BBC News format.

== Format ==
The programme lasted for 60 seconds as the name suggests, during which time the presenter condensed some of the day's news, sport and entertainment stories into a 60-second bulletin. This made it similar to FYI Daily, a programme of the same length which aired on ITV2, ITV3, ITV4 and ITVBe.

60 Seconds ran from 7:00 pm to 12:15 am with a bulletin at the top of the hour or after a programme had ended, if more than an hour. Throughout the bulletin, a line gradually crossed the screen which effectively counted down the seconds. There were sets of pictures running simultaneously for each story. Five stories were featured in every bulletin.

During the 2012 Summer Olympics and 2014 Commonwealth Games, bulletins ran from 7:00 am to 12:15 am to cover the day's other news stories.

== History ==
60 Seconds was launched on 16 July 2001, on BBC Choice, the predecessor to BBC Three, to appeal to those within the 18–34 age group; the channel's target audience, and also the demographic with lowest news-watching and voter turnout. When BBC Choice was replaced by BBC Three on 9 February 2003, the programme remained, with the titles updated to match the style of The 7 O'Clock News, which also aired on the channel.

Following a rebrand of BBC Three on 12 February 2008, the identity of 60 Seconds was also changed to match the new colour scheme of the channel. The first broadcast of the rebranded 60 Seconds featured a new take on the news; the headlines of news channels across the world, such as Al Jazeera and CNN, were read as opposed to the original UK headline bulletins. However, maintaining its original purpose, the UK's headlines were still included in the bulletin, as well as most of the original properties of 60 Seconds, with the keeping of the two images and videos running parallel to each other.

On 18 March 2013, 60 Seconds, along with the rest of BBC News, moved to Broadcasting House.

Several presenters featured on 60 Seconds would move to other news programmes; James Dagwell moved to BBC World News and the simulcast between BBC World News and BBC News Channel overnight as a presenter. Charlene White became a regular on ITV News. Tina Daheley co-presented Freespeech, and Susannah Streeter also presented BBC World News.

In October 2013, it was announced by Director-General Tony Hall that the programme would be rebranded under the Newsbeat banner of the BBC's youth radio station, Radio 1.

In March 2014, the BBC announced plans for BBC Three to move from linear television to online services, with its programming moving to BBC iPlayer, but did not immediately announce if 60 Seconds would be moved online along with BBC Three. However, in fall 2015, it was announced that 60 Seconds would be cancelled and replaced online by The Daily Drop.

BBC Three's original linear channel closed on 16 February 2016, with the final 60 Seconds bulletin airing shortly after midnight and before the American Dad! episode "Cock of the Sleepwalk".

60 Seconds did not return following the relaunch of the BBC Three linear channel in February 2022, with The Catch Up serving as its news programme.

== Presenters ==
- Tazeen Ahmad (2001–2005)
- Sevan Bastaijan (2003–2005)
- James Dagwell (2004–2008)
- Riz Lateef
- Libby Potter
- Amy Garcia
- Tasmin Lucia-Khan (2008–2010)
- Andy May (2008–2010)
- Charlene White
- Matt Cooke (2008–2011)
- Kasia Madera
- Sam Naz (2010–2016)
- Claudia-Liza Vanderpuije (2011–2016)
- Christopher Lee Johnson
- Karl Riley
- James Harrod
