= Sophie Long =

English journalist (born 1976)

- Born: Sophie Rebecca Long; 7 December 1976 (age 49); Torquay, Devon, England
- Occupations: Journalist, Newsreader
- Notable credit(s): Spotlight; BBC News Channel
- Spouse: Will Green (m. 2010; div. 2012)

Sophie Rebecca Long (born 7 December 1976) is an English journalist, best known for working for BBC News, mainly appearing as a presenter on the BBC News Channel.

On 18 March 2013, Long and co-presenter Simon McCoy read the final BBC News bulletin from BBC Television Centre.

== Early life ==
Long was born in Torquay, and in part raised in Weston-super-Mare when her parents moved there. She attended Broadoak School in Weston. She did her A-levels at Weston College's Sixth Form Centre.

After graduating from King's College London with a degree in War Studies, she worked as an election monitor in Cambodia. Long returned to the UK, working for Reuters news agency before moving to ITN as a newsroom assistant in London.

== Journalism career ==
After gaining a BBC scholarship, the first bursary endowed in honour of the late Jill Dando, Long studied for a diploma in broadcast journalism at Falmouth College of Arts. On gaining her qualifications, she worked at BBC Radio Cornwall and as a reporter for Spotlight, before joining the BBC's News Training Scheme, working for BBC Radio Shropshire and BBC Hereford and Worcester.

Long then became a news presenter for Midlands Today breakfast and lunchtime slots, before returning to Plymouth to become a main presenter on Spotlight. Long also presented the South West issue of The Politics Show, before moving to be a stand-in presenter and News Correspondent on the BBC News Channel. She soon gave up reporting to cover Annita McVeigh's maternity leave, presenting between 7 pm and 10 pm on Fridays, and between 7 pm and midnight on Saturdays and Sundays alongside Chris Lowe, as well as occasionally filling in during the week. She became the presenter of the weekend on the 4-7 pm shift on Saturdays and worked as a general relief presenter, particularly on weekday afternoons alongside Jon Sopel and Julian Worricker respectively. From March 2013, Long presented on Monday and Friday mornings until the slots were axed in favour of the new Victoria Derbyshire programme in April 2015. Long now appears as a news correspondent across the BBC, as well as regularly presenting the 8 pm BBC News Summary.

In May 2010, she travelled with Nick Clegg during the general election campaign, and in March 2011 reported live for the BBC News Channel from Central London during the anti-cuts protest march.

On 27 July 2011, she provided reports and coverage from the Olympic Park site, which is home to various venues and stadia for the London 2012 Summer Olympics on the day the UK celebrated the year to go milestone.

In November 2011, Long travelled to the Middle East on a fact finding mission with the Britain Israel Communications and Research Centre (BICOM), visiting campaigning groups in Israel and the West Bank, and meeting Israeli and Palestinian leaders.

Shortly before 1 pm on 18 March 2013, Long and co-presenter Simon McCoy read the final BBC News bulletin from BBC Television Centre, with BBC News moving to Broadcasting House in the West End of London for the BBC News at One.

After stints covering the Far East and as LA Correspondent, Long has now returned to England as a BBC News correspondent.

== Personal life ==
Long married Will Green in June 2010 in Cornwall after dating for many years. The marriage ended two years later.
