= James Dagwell =

British journalist

James Dagwell is a British journalist working predominantly as a Senior News Producer and Editor in the UK broadcasting industry.

== Early life ==
James Dagwell was born in Beckenham, Kent in 1974. He spent his early years in Kent before moving to North Devon and later to East Sussex.

== Education ==
He was educated at Beacon Community College, a state comprehensive in the town of Crowborough, East Sussex. He went on to study for a degree in English and Theatre Studies at Royal Holloway College, University of London.

== Life and career ==
He began his career as a news desk assistant for GMTV, a breakfast TV show on ITV. He then became one of the UK's first videojournalists for a London cable news station in 1997 before moving to ITV Westcountry news in Plymouth, Devon in 1998 as a TV reporter and presenter.

He joined the BBC in 2000 as a producer for Newsround. In 2003, he moved to BBC Three at the launch of their nightly news show The 7 O'Clock News as a reporter and presenter. In 2006, he became a presenter of 60 Seconds on BBC Three for two years and launched the nightly Entertainment 24 on BBC News 24.

In 2008 he moved to BBC World News as a TV presenter becoming a familiar face around the world. His slot was simulcast overnight on the UK-facing BBC News. He had his own entertainment show, E24, at weekends on both BBC News and BBC World News. He also occasionally presented entertainment news on Claudia Winkleman's BBC Radio 2 programme plus Your News and STORYFix, an irreverent look back at the week's news which was one of BBC News' first shareable video clips.

He took a sabbatical in 2011 and returned to the BBC in 2012 as a Senior Producer for BBC News on BBC One leading their 8pm news bulletin.

Dagwell made the move to the BBC World Service in 2016 as a Senior Producer and subsequently Editor, leading delivery of the best of BBC News to millions of consumers around the world who don't have access to free and fair information. His work included expanding the BBC's reach in new markets, commissioning and creating content and also training for new journalists.

In 2023, he joined BBC News' International Services, supporting the leadership team that oversees the BBC World Service and BBC Monitoring.
