= Sangita Myska =

British journalist and presenter

Sangita Myska is an English television and radio presenter, producer, and journalist, who has worked in a large range of media channels and received multiple media awards. Until May 2024, she hosted an early afternoon weekend phone-in show on LBC Radio. Myska continues to appear in several independent media channels, including Zeteo, and on numerous public discussion panels.

== Early life and education ==
Born in Tanzania, Myska is of African and Indian heritage; she speaks Marathi and to a lesser extent Hindi. She was educated at Claremont High School in London and at the University of Birmingham, where she was awarded an 2:1 Bachelor of Laws degree in law and politics.

== Career ==
=== BBC radio and television ===
Myska began her career as a member of the BBC News trainee reporter scheme, specialising in radio. She served the final attachment of her apprenticeship at BBC Radio Sheffield, where she was initially employed as a staff reporter and then as a producer on the channel's Drivetime show (hosted by Dean "Pips" Pepall). After learning her craft in local broadcasting, she was promoted to a national role as a producer for BBC Radio 5 Live, and then to a production position on Five Live's television equivalent, BBC News 24. Her first appearance in front of the camera was in 1997, when she began working as a news reporter for BBC Scotland.

After winning the BBC's Talent competition in 2001, Myska made her national television debut in BBC One's long-running Holiday travel show, subsequently appearing too in one of its many spin-offs, Summer Holiday. In 2002, she returned to BBC News as a correspondent on BBC One's national bulletins. That same year saw her on BBC Two fronting a six-part undercover investigation into car crime and consumer fraud. In February 2003, she was one of the three presenter-reporters assigned to anchor The News Show, a 15-minute 7:45 p.m. weekday news programme on the BBC's new channel aimed at young viewers, BBC Three. She reverted to working on the BBC's main bulletins in March 2004.

Myska was invited to join Channel 5's news team in 2005, but elected to remain with the BBC. In 2008, she led an undercover investigation into child trafficking in Bulgaria. Her exposé led to her being invited to assist the United Nations Office on Drugs and Crime in its efforts to bring trafficking to an end. The many other shows on BBC television to which she contributed included Sian Williams's BBC One religious current affairs programme, Sunday Morning Live; The Daily Politics with Andrew Neil on BBC Two; Real Story with Fiona Bruce on BBC One; Outrageous Fortunes: Guinness on BBC One and BBC Three; Lifting the Bonnet, a current affairs series, on BBC Two; World Olympic Dreams: Mongolia Rising on BBC One; The One Show, also on BBC One; and the current affairs series 4X4.

Myska's work on the BBC's flagship radio channel, BBC Radio 4, featured a spell on its early morning news programme, Today, and also several high-profile documentary and current affairs programmes. Among them were Positive Thinking, both presented and co-created by her, a 9 a.m. weekday show about problem solving; the human interest show Lives in a Landscape; What's in a Name, an exploration of the pride and prejudice associated with having a foreign-sounding name in contemporary Britain; A Family Without a Child, a programme relating the experiences of childless British women.

Of particular note was Myska's two-part BBC Radio 4 series, ‘The Secret Lives of Carers’ and 'The Hidden Story of British Slavery’. ‘The Secret Lives of Carers’ investigated the poor working conditions of domiciliary workers and abuse of vulnerable people within the British home care system. Myska's team was the first to reveal that many domiciliary workers were being paid per minute, which at that time was a major revelation. The documentaries led to widespread debate about the privatisation of services and to politicians demanding improved working conditions.

'The Hidden Story of British Slavery’, for BBC Radio 4, was a documentary about the UK nationals trafficked into slavery in the 21st century. It revealed that a quarter of the victims of modern slavery were British-born, and examined why the government safeguarding mechanism set up to identify and protect victims was failing.

Myska also reported and presented the BBC podcast dedicated to the daily proceedings of the public inquiry into the public inquiry regarding the Grenfell Tower fire. 'The Grenfell Tower Inquiry Podcast' went on to win Best Current Affairs Podcast Gold Award at the British Podcast Awards for 2019.

=== LBC ===
On 11 June 2022, Myska began hosting a weekend phone-in show for LBC Radio, broadcasting between 1pm and 4pm in a slot formerly occupied by Maajid Nawaz.

On 14 April 2024, Myska conducted a "robust" interview with Israeli spokesperson Avi Hyman in which she questioned Israel's airstrike on the Iranian embassy in Syria. After 14 April she was absent from her weekend show without explanation, and on 1 May, LBC announced that she was leaving the station. A change.org petition calling on LBC to reinstate her was signed by over 40,000 people. LBC provided no explanation for her removal. Many listeners speculated that her removal may have been related to Myska's interview with Hyman. Sources connected to the station suggested that her departure was due to falling hourly audience figures. LBC host James O'Brien said "Unfortunately, like every other presenter on LBC, I stand and fall by my listening hours, by my ratings and when my contract comes up for renewal the first thing management will look at is my listening figures.". Myska's contract was terminated 16 episodes before her contract renewal date. Myska said contemporary audience data showed her average audience rising by 12.5 per cent, with later figures taking the show beyond the half million mark.

The large number of protesters at Myska's abrupt and unheralded departure from LBC, including about 100 prominent media figures and over 40,000 listeners, queried the statements by LBC and O'Brien, especially since no figures to substantiate the claim were published. Several commentators also disapproved of O'Brien's criticism of Myska because Myska was not given an opportunity to present her view.

O'Brien also suggested that Myska had deliberately remained silent about the circumstances of her departure and had allowed ‘Antisemitic conspiracies’ to develop. In May 2025 Myska issued a statement through Bindmans solicitors saying these comments were misleading because she was prevented by contractual agreements from commenting on the circumstances of her departure. Myska also issued a tweet expanding upon that.

=== Subsequent appearances ===
Exactly one year after Myska's last LBC show on 14 April 2024, she returned to broadcasting in an interview with Mehdi Hasan, a British-American progressive broadcaster and writer and founder of the media company Zeteo, and since February 2024 a columnist for The Guardian. This was a live event marking a year since Mehdi Hasan launched his media company Zeteo News, on the Substack platform. The sold-out tour took place in the UK, Canada and the US. On 11 August 2026, Double Down News issued an interview with her conducted by Richard Sanders, in which they discuss her dismissal from LBC, the contractual restrictions on her freedom of speech and mainstream media response to her dismissal, and its journalistic ethics in the time of Palestinian genocide.

== Personal life ==
Myska is married. She has suffered miscarriages and has spoken out about the issue, including on her former LBC show.

In February 2009, Myska began volunteering for the Akanksha Foundation, training boys in the use of journalism to serve their community.

In September 2009, it was revealed that she had been mugged the previous year by Daniel Mykoo and his brother Matthew, dubbed by the British press as the London "strangler-robbers."

== Awards ==
Her report into child trafficking led her to receive multiple awards: in 2007, European Voice magazine named Myska as one of Europe's 50 most influential people because of it; the report also won her a place on the longlist of the 2007 Amnesty International Journalism Awards; in 2012, the Women of the Future Programme (International) named her Asian Woman of the Year in the Media because of it, but also because of her coverage of the London riots of 2011 and their aftermath. In 2014, her radio work on the consequences of childlessness was acknowledged by a place among the finalists for the Journalist of the Year and Investigation of the Year awards bestowed by the Asian Media Group.

In 2019, The Grenfell Tower Inquiry Podcast (on which Myska was the sole correspondent) won the Gold Award for the Best Current Affairs Podcast at the British Podcast Awards.

Myska won the Eastern Eye Arts, Culture & Theatre Awards' Current Affairs Presenter of the Year 2023. In 2024, Myska was named Media Personality of the Year 2024 in the 2024 Asia Media Awards.
