= Sir William Perkins's School =

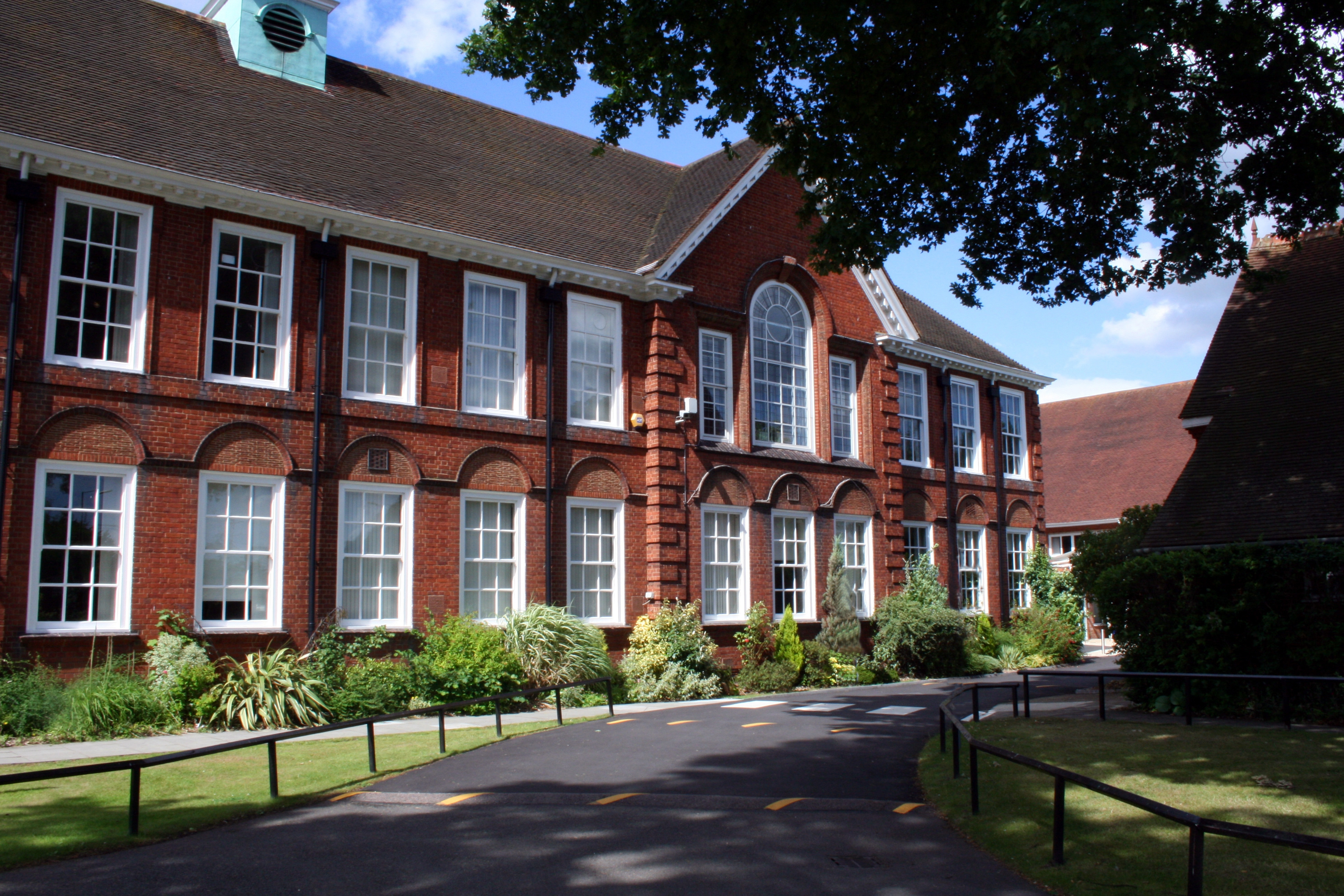

Location
- Guildford Road; Chertsey, Surrey, KT16 9BN; England; 51°23′17″N 0°30′50″W

Information
- Type: Private Co-Ed day school
- Motto: A Spe in Spem (Latin: From Hope to Hope)
- Established: 1725
- Founder: Sir William Perkins's School
- Local authority: Surrey
- Department for Education URN: 125425 Tables
- Head: Debbie Picton
- Gender: Girls and Boys
- Age: 11 to 18
- Enrolment: approx. 580
- Houses: Lonsdale, Montagu, Pankhurst, Quant
- Colours: Navy and Gold
- Website: www.swps.org.uk

Sir William Perkins's School is a private co-educational day school for girls and boys aged 11 to 18 in Chertsey, Surrey, England. Founded in 1725, it is situated on 13 acres of greenbelt land on the outskirts of Chertsey. The Good Schools Guide described the school as "a friendly school with very good academic standards - ideal for students who enjoy healthy competition and getting stuck into what is on offer."

== History ==
The school was founded in 1725 by a wealthy Chertsey merchant, Sir William Perkins. Originally for twenty-five boys, the school extended its education to include twenty-five girls in 1736. It moved to purpose-built accommodation on its present twelve-acre site in 1819.

In 1944, the school became a voluntary controlled grammar school for girls maintained by Surrey Education Authority and in 1978 became fully independent as an educational foundation administered by trustees.

Sir William Perkins's will open its doors to boys from September 2026. This will be a phased introduction, with boys initially joining Years 7 and 12, with the School becoming fully co-educational by 2030.

== Facilities ==
The School is situated in 13 acres of greenbelt land in Surrey with grounds and playing fields, tennis courts and a floodlit Astroturf pitch. The School embarked on a number of building projects during the mid 2000s starting with a new Sports Hall, Performing Arts base, fitness studio and a dance studio. More recently a large Atrium café has been built to connect to the existing dining hall, two new Drama Studios and a state of the art Sixth Form Centre with seminar rooms, a careers centre, large common room with kitchen, work spaces and an outdoor terrace. The SWPS Boat Club was opened in 2016 as part of the School's Building Development programme and is situated at Laleham Reach.

== Houses ==
Originally there were just two houses: L and P. The girls who were perceived to be more literary from their entrance exam were put into L (Latin) and the girls more inclined towards Mathematics were put into P (Parallel). The additional houses, M and Q, were added in the later formative years of the school that stands today. In 2014, the house names were changed, from single letters to names of famous and intelligent women of Britain: Lonsdale, Montagu, Pankhurst and Quant. Each house bears its own crest and colour: Lonsdale (red), Montagu (yellow), Pankhurst (green) and Quant (blue).

In the 1960's and 1970's there were four houses, Tulk, Brunner, Rollitt and Rickman. L and P were the names of the classes, eg 1L, 3P - not houses.

== Curriculum ==
Sir William Perkins's School has a tradition of academic excellence. It achieves outstanding results at GCSE and A level, and is regularly listed highly in league tables and the Sunday Times Parent Power. The 2019 ISI inspection report stated 'The quality of the pupils' academic and personal development is excellent.'. The school has had a tradition of academic excellence and is often at the top of examination result tables in the county. Appearing within The Sunday Times Top 150 Independent Secondary Schools (Dec 2021).

== Co-Curricular ==
Sir William Perkins's offers a wide range of co-curricular activities, including sport, drama, music, art, the Duke of Edinburgh award and many more. Sports teams and athletes regularly take part in competitions at district, county and national level. The rowing team Sir William Perkins's School Boat Club is one of the country's most successful school programmes, competing in the National Schools' Regatta, Henley Women's Regatta and Henley Royal Regatta. It is coached by Chris Boddy, former GB rower and current junior GB coach. SWPS pupils and former pupils are regularly selected to the GB Rowing Squad.

== Co-Education ==
Sir William Perkins's will open its doors to boys from September 2026, subject to regulatory approval from the DfE. This will be a phased introduction, with boys initially joining Years 7 and 12, with the School becoming fully co-educational by 2030.

== The Perkonian Network ==
The Perkonian's form the Alumni and are an active part of the Sir William Perkins's School life. There are various events arranged for them throughout the year, in particular Henley Royal Regatta.

== Notable former pupils ==
- Hattie Taylor - British Olympic Bronze Medallist Rower
- Pam Cook - academic, author, Professor Emerita of film
- Trisha Goddard - television presenter
- Anna Wilson- Jones - television actress
- Celina Hinchcliffe - sports journalist
- Susie Amy - stage and television actress
- Lara McAllen - musician
- Charlotte Harris - Chelsea flower show Gold Medal Winner landscape gardener
