= Kate Silverton =

English child therapist and former journalist

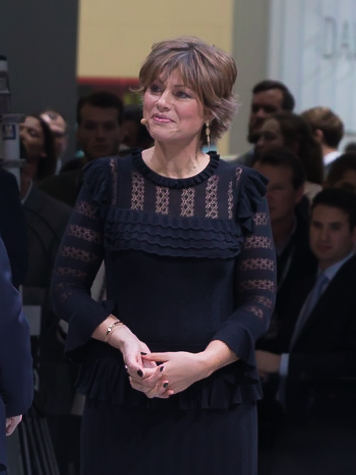
- Silverton at the Geneva International Motor Show in 2018
- Born: Kate Silverton; 4 August 1970 (age 55); Waltham Abbey, Essex, England
- Education: BSc in psychology, St Cuthbert's Society, Durham
- Occupations: Child therapist, journalist, newsreader, broadcaster, author
- Years active: 1992–2021, as journalist
- Notable credits: BBC Breakfast; BBC News at One; BBC News at Six; BBC News at Ten; BBC News Summary; BBC Weekend News; BBC News Channel; BBC World News; GMT; "There's No Such Thing As 'Naughty': The ground-breaking guide for parents with children aged 0-5"
- Spouse: Mike Heron (m. 2010)
- Children: 2
- Website: www.katesilverton.com

Kate Silverton (born 4 August 1970) is an English child therapist. She formerly worked as a broadcaster and newsreader for the BBC. Silverton was a regular presenter of BBC News at One and BBC Weekend News, as well as making occasional appearances on the BBC News Channel and BBC World News. In 2018 she participated in series 16 of BBC's Strictly Come Dancing, where she was paired with professional dancer Aljaž Škorjanec and finished in 8th place.

In 2023 she became a qualified child therapist and stated the following year that she had been able to overcome decades of distress due to being sexually abused as a child.

== Early life and education ==
Silverton was born in Waltham Abbey in Essex, England, the daughter of Terence "Terry" Silverton, a black-cab driver-turned-registered hypnotherapist and Patricia Silverton. Silverton has two sisters. Silverton attended West Hatch High School in Chigwell, Essex, where she was Head Girl and a junior swimming champion. She also competed in the triathlon. She was a Girl Guide and gained the Queen's Guide Award.

Silverton graduated from St Cuthbert's Society, a college at Durham University with a Bachelor of Science degree in psychology, having previously studied Arabic and Middle Eastern History for a year.

== Early career ==
Silverton worked for a London-based bank before becoming a journalist. She trained with the BBC, working on Look North news before becoming a reporter and presenter at Tyne Tees Television.

She was a panellist on Channel 5's The Wright Stuff, and hosted ITV's The Psychic Show in 2002. She also featured on The Heaven and Earth Show, Big Strong Boys, and Weekend Breakfast on BBC Radio 5 Live, before joining BBC News.

In 2003, Silverton allegedly hit Rod Liddle, the former editor of BBC Radio 4's Today programme, during a pilot for a new political show. Liddle said: "I made a stupid comment about the disabled which Kate rightly took exception to."

== BBC News ==
From 2005 until December 2007, Silverton was a presenter on BBC News 24 and also a regular relief presenter for BBC Breakfast.

In December 2007, she was named as the presenter of the BBC News 8 p.m. summary, a 90-second round-up of the news shown on BBC One, which she presented for two months. She presented the BBC News at One from February to August 2008, whilst main presenter Sophie Raworth was on maternity leave.

BBC Scotland apologised to viewers in August 2010, after Silverton swore at the end of a news bulletin on live television. Viewers in Scotland were the only ones who heard the words. A spokesman for BBC Scotland said: "Kate thought she was off-air at the time. The microphones hadn't been faded down and the mistake only went out in Scotland."

Silverton took maternity leave in October 2011, and returned to the News at One in April 2012. Until May 2012, she was the deputy presenter of the BBC News at One, presenting on Mondays and when main presenter Sophie Raworth was unavailable. Sian Williams later took over this role. Silverton returned to the deputy role in October 2013 to cover for Williams' leave. Williams later left the BBC so Silverton regained her role. Silverton took a second period of maternity leave in May 2014. She took two years off, returning in April 2016.

== Other BBC projects ==
On 1 April 2008, alongside the historian Dan Snow, she presented live coverage of the celebrations held at RAF Fairford for the 90th anniversary of the Royal Air Force. In 2008, Silverton joined the presenting team for Big Cat Diary on BBC One. On 31 December 2008 she co-presented coverage of New Year Live aboard HMS Belfast in London on BBC One with Nick Knowles.

In April 2009, she appeared as a mentor in the BBC Two series The Speaker, offering her advice on good storytelling and public speaking.

In May 2009, she presented a documentary called 10 Things You Need to Know About Sleep, which looked at different ways to deal with insomnia.

From 2010, she presented the Sunday morning show on BBC Radio 5 Live, running from 09:30 to 11:00.

In June 2012, Silverton interviewed William, Prince of Wales, who called for a halt to the killing of rhinos for their horns in Africa. Silverton has also acted as a stand-in presenter for the Radio Four series Last Word.

== Strictly Come Dancing ==
Between 8 September and 18 November 2018, Silverton participated in the sixteenth series of Strictly Come Dancing with professional dance partner Aljaž Škorjanec. The couple were eliminated in Week 9 (Blackpool), losing a dance-off against Graeme Swann and his partner Oti Mabuse.

== Philip Hayton incident ==
In September 2005, Silverton drew media attention when her BBC News 24 co-newsreader Philip Hayton, who had worked for the BBC for 37 years, resigned from his position six months into a year's contract, citing issues of "incompatibility" with Silverton. The Daily Telegraph, without substantiation and quoting an unnamed 'insider', reported that Hayton turned to Silverton during a break and said "I don't like you."

The Daily Mirror quoted another BBC 'insider' as saying that Silverton is "...pushy beyond belief. Behind her big superficial smile she can be a really aggressive, manipulative monster who always gets what she wants." Hayton merely cited "incompatibility" with Silverton as his reason and when his managers refused to move Silverton to another time slot, he left. Silverton was in the peculiar position of having to go through the morning's paper review live on air the morning the story broke, avoiding any discussion of the story and chiding her new co-anchor when he looked to refer to it.

However, several figures spoke up for Silverton. Jon Sopel, a fellow BBC News 24 presenter, who was Silverton's co-anchor at News 24 for several months, commented on the incident saying: "She's warm and friendly. With Kate, what you see is what you get – she's bright, lively, talented and vivacious. I like and trust her. Yes, she's ambitious... but aren't we all?"

Rod Liddle, who was allegedly hit by Silverton in 2003, nevertheless defended his former co-presenter. Liddle said: "Kate is intelligent, attractive and has strong opinions. She was absolutely lovely, good fun, professional, intelligent and devoid of the usual afflictions of TV presenters – narcissism and greed."

== Child therapist ==
In 2021 Silverton left the BBC to follow what she described as her "life's passion" and become a qualified child therapist. She told the PA news agency: "My academic background is in child psychology, and becoming a mum really inspired me too. My journey has really been decades long, both in understanding more about children's mental health, and as a parent really benefiting from all the interviews and access to advice that I was given by incredible people." She admitted that when she competed in Strictly Come Dancing in 2018, it was with the intention of leaving journalism to train in child therapy. She now works in a primary school supporting young children with complex needs.

== Personal life ==
Silverton married Mike Heron, a former Royal Marine, on 18 December 2010. On 5 November 2011, Silverton gave birth to a baby girl. Her baby daughter was eventually conceived naturally, after four unsuccessful cycles of IVF. After losing an ovary during an operation to remove a cyst at the age of 29, Silverton had been told that she was unlikely to get pregnant naturally.

After suffering two miscarriages, Silverton announced on 25 January 2014, at the age of 43, that she was pregnant with her second child. She used her Twitter account to break the news, stating: "Mike and I are very happy to share that Clemency is set to become a big sister this summer." Their second child, a son, was born on 26 June 2014.

Silverton is 5 feet 11 inches (1.80 m) tall. In August 2018, she said the producers of Strictly Come Dancing had custom-made shoes created for her because none in the Strictly wardrobe were big enough for her above-average size-nine feet.

In 2022, Silverton was training to be a children's counsellor, and had qualified by 2023.

Silverton lives in the Cotswolds, having moved from west London in early 2024.

In an article for The Daily Telegraph in August 2024, Silverton strongly criticised Huw Edwards for viewing images of children being abused and stated that she had been sexually abused as a child. She said: "It has taken me five decades to finally let go of my own dark weight of shame and be released from my suffering. It has been a long hard road to healing."

=== Cosmetic surgery lawsuit ===
In January 2008, Silverton sued a clinic after an allegedly botched cosmetic surgery procedure for treatment of acne scars. Silverton said that the procedure caused a severe skin reaction and she had to take two weeks off work after the treatment. The lawsuit filed for unspecified monetary damages.

== Bibliography ==
- Kate Silverton, There's no such thing as 'naughty'. Little, Brown. Boston, Mass., 27 April 2021.

Media offices
Preceded by Natasha Kaplinsky	Main Presenter of BBC News 8pm summary 2007–2008	Succeeded by Ellie Crisell
Preceded by Ben Brown	Main Saturday Presenter of BBC Weekend News; 2009–present	Incumbent
Preceded by Louise Minchin	Deputy Presenter of BBC News at One; 2009–2012	Succeeded by Sian Williams
Preceded by Sian Williams	Deputy Presenter of BBC News at One; 2013–present	Incumbent
Preceded by New Post	Main Relief Presenter of BBC News at One; 2012–2013	Succeeded by Simon McCoy
