= Jayne Irving =

British TV presenter (born 1956)

Jayne Irving (born 30 August 1956, Sheffield, West Riding of Yorkshire) is a British TV presenter best known for appearing on the Breakfast Television show Good Morning Britain, plus the BBC One weekday morning phone-in show Open Air, which discussed some of the programmes that had been broadcast the night before.

== Career ==
Irving began her broadcasting career reading the news bulletins on the Sheffield-based independent radio station Radio Hallam in the late 1970s.

Irving worked as a reporter in Bristol before joining TV-am. Initially, she presented the news bulletins on "Good Morning Britain". Early in 1984, she got the opportunity to cover for Anne Diamond and then established herself as a regular on TV-am, alongside either Nick Owen or John Stapleton.

In 1986, Irving became the regular host of the new After Nine slot and appeared every weekday. She was a driving force behind the station's successful life-saving Cervical Cancer Campaign.

Between 1986 and 1990, Irving was a regular co-presenter of the BBC morning phone-in programme Open Air with Eamonn Holmes and Gloria Hunniford. It consisted of phone comments about the previous night's television in the United Kingdom.

Irving went on to present for various regional TV companies, including Central Weekend for ITV Central, Westcountry Focus for Westcountry Television, and also the Living satellite channel. In 1999, she presented the Cheating Hearts strand on Talk Radio UK (now called Talksport).

More recently, she has presented programmes on satellite channels, including the Travel Channel.
