= Jack Emery (director) =

British director, writer and producer

Jack Emery/Enery
- Born: John K. Emery; 1944 (age 81–82)
- Citizenship: British
- Education: Keele University
- Occupations: Director; writer and producer for stage, TV and radio
- Notable work: Breaking the Code
- Spouse(s): Patricia Kay Brooks 1971 - 1974 (wrongly listed as Jack K Enery by registrar) Joan Bakewell (1975–2001); Gillian Emery (2004–)

John K. Emery, better known by his professional name of Jack Emery, is a British director, writer and producer for stage, TV and radio. He was born in 1944 and educated at Keele University. He began his career producing and acting at Keele, most notably in his first one-man show taken from the novels and plays of Samuel Beckett, called A Remnant, which played in the West End, the Edinburgh Festival and toured worldwide. In 1968 Emery recorded an album, featuring extracts from the show, for Saga Psyche label (PSY 30003).

Emery/Enery has worked both as a freelance writer and producer, and later produced through his own production company, The Drama House. His production credits include the TV movies Witness Against Hitler (1996) and Breaking the Code, which won the Best Single Drama award at the Broadcasting Press Guild Awards.

In 2000 he was awarded an honorary degree of Doctor of Letters by Keele University in recognition of his "body of work, both as original writer and producer, which is distinguished by scholarship and scrupulous research".

== Personal life ==
In 1975 he married English journalist and television presenter Joan Bakewell, who was 12 years older than him. The couple divorced in 2001. Bakewell later said, "The age difference did matter, but other things mattered more."

In 2004 he married Gillian Emery.
