= Andy May (presenter) =

British TV and radio broadcaster (born 1987)

Andy May (born 4 July 1987 in Shrewsbury), is a television and radio broadcaster and Radio Academy award winner.

== Career ==
Andy hosts and reports on BT Sport where he participates in UEFA Champions League match coverage.

He was nominated by the Sports Journalists' Association for 2015 Broadcast Sports Presenter of the Year, which was won by Sky Sports cricket anchor Ian Ward (cricketer). He was nominated again in 2017.

Andy conducted the first major television interview with Steven Gerrard following his transfer from Liverpool F.C. to LA Galaxy and followed Leicester City F.C. during the club's fight against relegation during the 2014–15 Premier League season as well as the championship winning 2015–16 Premier League campaign.

In addition to BT Sport, he also features regularly as a host on The Sports Network in Canada and Radio France Internationale.

Previously Andy fronted the 'Community Feature' on Match of the Day and remains the youngest journalist - aged twenty - to have presented on BBC Radio 1. Other credits include: Fox Sports Asia (formerly ESPN STAR Sports), Real Madrid TV and Sky Sports.

Andy began his broadcasting career with Takeover Radio and aged fifteen, he was named as the 'Best Newcomer To Professional Radio' by the Radio Academy.
