= Joan Bakewell =

English journalist, television presenter and politician (born 1933)

The Right Honourable The Baroness Bakewell DBE HonFBA FRSA
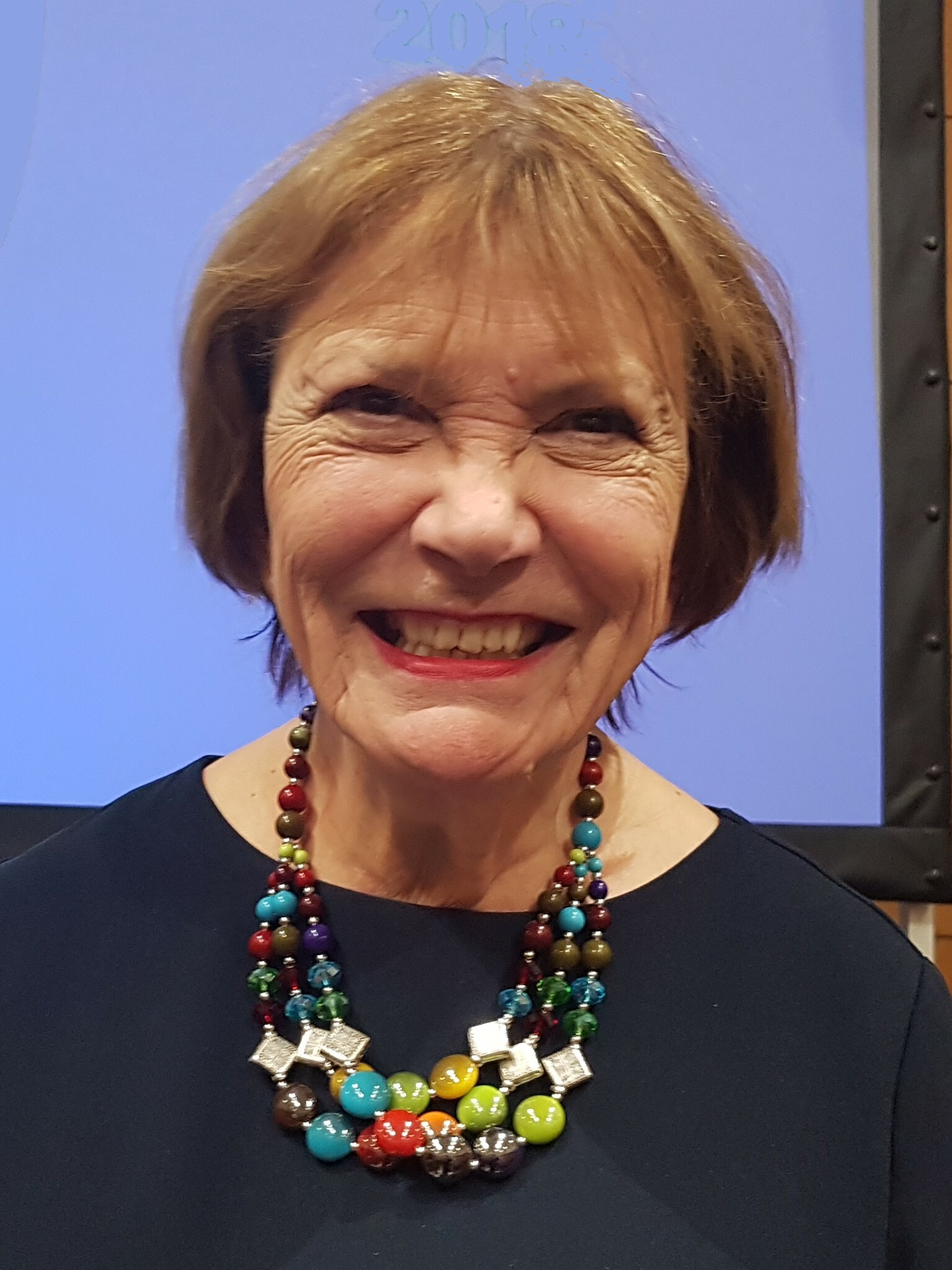
- Bakewell in 2018
- Born: Joan Dawson Rowlands; 16 April 1933 (age 93); Heaton Moor, England
- Education: Newnham College, Cambridge (BA)
- Occupations: TV presenter; newsreader; journalist
- Years active: 1965–present
- Employer: BBC
- Title: President of Birkbeck, University of London
- Political party: Labour
- Spouses: Michael Bakewell (m. 1955; div. 1972) Jack Emery (m. 1975; div. 2001)
- Children: 2

Member of the House of Lords
- Lord Temporal
- Life peerage 21 January 2011

Joan Dawson Bakewell, Baroness Bakewell (née Rowlands; born 16 April 1933), is an English journalist, television presenter and Labour Party peer. Baroness Bakewell is president of Birkbeck, University of London; she is also an author and playwright, and has received a Humanist of the Year award for services to humanism.

== Early life and education ==
Bakewell was born on 16 April 1933 in Heaton Moor, Stockport, England, and moved to Hazel Grove before she was three. Both of her grandfathers were factory workers: the paternal Rowlands branch of the family stemmed from the lead mining villages of the Ystwyth valley, in Wales. Her great-grandfather moved to Salford, where he was a preacher in the Church Army and her grandfather was an iron turner. On the maternal side, her grandfather was a cooper at Ardwick Brewery. The family lived in Gorton, a district of Manchester.

Bakewell was educated at Stockport High School for Girls, a grammar school in local authority control, where she became head girl. She won a scholarship and attended Newnham College, Cambridge, where she studied economics, then history, and joined the Marshall Society and the Mummers Acting Society.

== Career ==
=== Broadcasting ===
Joan Bakewell began her career as a studio manager for BBC Radio, before moving into television. Bakewell left after a year to try supply teaching. She then became an advertising copywriter with McCann Erickson, then with Hobson Bates, and later David Williams Ltd. In the early 60s Bakewell was TV presenter for ATV's Sunday Break, Southern Television's Home at 4.30, BBC's Meeting Point and the BBC series The Second Sex.

She first became known as one of the presenters of the BBC2 programme Late Night Line-Up (1965–72 and 2008). Frank Muir dubbed her "the thinking man's crumpet" during this period and the moniker stuck; Bakewell herself was not insulted by the epithet. In 1968, she took the role of narrator of the BBC TV production of Cold Comfort Farm, a three-part serial, and played a TV interviewer in the 1960s film The Touchables.

Bakewell co-presented Reports Action, a Sunday teatime programme which encouraged the public to donate their services to various good causes, for Granada Television in 1976–78. In the 1970s Bakewell worked for both the BBC: "Where is Your God?", "Who Cares" "The Affirmative Way" and many Holiday Programmes between 1974 and 1978. Bakewell starred in 4 series of Granada's pioneering Reports Action, a series that first encouraged the public to contribute goods and services to good causes. Subsequently, she returned to the BBC, and co-presented a short-lived late-night television arts programme, briefly worked on the BBC Radio 4 PM programme, and was Newsnight's arts correspondent (1986–88). Arts coverage was then dropped from news programmes in the era of John Birt's changes to the BBC. Bakewell switched to being the main presenter of the ethics documentary series Heart of the Matter, which she presented for 12 years. She resigned from the programme in 1999.

In 2001, Bakewell wrote and presented a four-part series for BBC Two called Taboo, a personal exploration of the concepts of taste, decency and censorship. The programme dealt frankly with sex and nudity and in some cases pushed the boundaries of what is permissible on mainstream television. Bakewell used frank language and "four-letter words" to describe pornography and sex toys. She watched a couple having sex while they were making a pornographic film and read out an "obscene" extract from the novel Tropic of Cancer by Henry Miller.

Taboo was referred to the Director of Public Prosecutions by the National Viewers' and Listeners' Association, then headed by John Beyer. Following the complaint, Bakewell faced the nominal prospect of being charged with blasphemous libel after she recited part of an erotic poem by James Kirkup concerning a Roman centurion's affection for Jesus, "The Love that Dares to Speak its Name". After its first publication in 1976, Denis Lemon, the editor of Gay News, had been given a nine-month suspended jail sentence. Bakewell later wrote that in the programme she "read this poem with extreme distaste and I hope that showed on my face." The Broadcasting Standards Commission rejected complaints from viewers.

On 26 May 2008, Bakewell introduced an archive evening on BBC Parliament called Permissive Night. The programme examined the liberalising legislation passed by Parliament in the late 1960s. Topics covered included changes to divorce law, the death penalty, the legalisation of abortion, the Race Relations Bill, the partial decriminalisation of homosexual acts (using editions of the documentary series Man Alive) and the relaxation of censorship. Permissive Night concluded with a special one-off edition of Late Night Line-Up which discussed the themes raised in the programmes over the course of the evening.

In 2009, she won the category Journalist of the Year at the annual Stonewall Awards.

In 2017, Bakewell was one of the minor hosts of the Channel 5 documentary series Secrets of the National Trust.

On Sky Arts, Bakewell co-hosted Portrait Artist of the Year and Landscape Artist of the Year, initially alongside Frank Skinner and later Stephen Mangan.

Radio and television
Year	Programme
1979–1981	BBC Radio 4 PM
1981–1987	BBC Television Arts Correspondent
1987–1999	Heart of the Matter Host
1999–2000	Radio 3's Artist of the Week
2001–2014	Radio 3's Belief Series
2009–2016	Radio 4's Inside the Ethics Committee
2011–2012	Classic FM Series
2013–2022	Sky Arts Portrait Artist of the Year
2015–2022	Sky Arts Landscape Artist of the Year
2017–2020	Radio 4's We Need to Talk about Death

=== Writing ===
Bakewell writes for the British newspaper The Independent in the "Editorial and Opinion" section. Typically, her articles concern aspects of social life and culture but sometimes she writes more political articles, often focusing on aspects relevant to life in the United Kingdom. Formerly, from 2003, she wrote the "Just Seventy" column for The Guardian newspaper. In September 2008, she began a fortnightly column in the Times2 section of The Times.

Her first novel was published in March 2009 by Virago Press. All the Nice Girls drew on her experiences in war-time Merseyside to tell the story of a school "adopting" a ship.

Publications
Year	Publication
1970	The New Priesthood (with Professor Nick Garnham)
1970	A Fine and Private Place (with John Drummond)
1977	The Complete Traveller
2003	The Centre of the Bed
2005	Belief
2006	The View from Here
2009	All the Nice Girls
2011	She's Leaving Home
2016	Stop the Clocks
2021	The Tick of Two Clocks

Journalism
Year	Publication	Occupation
1970	Manchester Evening News	Columnist
1970	The Times	Television Critic
1970	The Illustrated London News	Profile Writer
1987–1990	The Sunday Times	Columnist
2003–2005	The Guardian	Columnist
2006–2008	The Independent	Columnist
2008–2010	The Times	Columnist

== Public roles ==
She is chairman of the theatre company Shared Experience.

She is a Patron for the Plaza Cinema, Stockport.

It was announced in November 2010 that she would be awarded a life peerage, joining the Labour benches. She was created Baroness Bakewell, of Stockport in the County of Greater Manchester, on 21 January 2011, and formally introduced to the House of Lords on 25 January 2011 supported by fellow Labour peers Lord Puttnam and Baroness Kennedy.

In September 2017, Bakewell was elected co-chair of the All-Party Parliamentary Humanist Group, the cross-party group that represents humanists in Parliament.

Public life
Year	Organization
1984–1999	Council of the Friends of the Tate Gallery
1994–2003	Board of the Royal National Theatre
1994–2003	Governor at the BFI
1998–2003	Board of the Royal National Theatre
2000–2002	Chair of the BFI
2004–2011	Chair of the National Campaign for the Arts
2007–2012	Chair of the theatre company: Shared Experience

Labour peer
Year	Position
1999	Awarded CBE
2008	Awarded DBE
2011	Member of the House of Lords.
2013–2015	Communications Committee of the House of Lords
2016–2018	The Speaker's Arts Advisory Panel
2017	Select Committee on AI
2017	Joint Chair of the Humanists APPG
2019	Select Committee on the Regeneration of the Seaside
2019	Elected member of the British Academy

== Views and advocacy ==
In 2008, Bakewell criticised the absence of older women on British television. She said: "I think the fact that people are phased out, people like Moira Stuart and Selina [Scott] – out of the public eye – when they become a certain age is a real disadvantage to serious broadcasting. There's a whole segment of the British population that does not see its equivalent in serious broadcasting and that is women over 55. Now, that is not healthy for a broadcasting organisation's relationship with its audience. The public should be represented on the screen in various colours, forms, sexualities, whatever."

In 2010, Bakewell criticised the side effects of the sexual revolution of the 1960s. She said: "I never thought I would hear myself say as much, but I'm with Mrs Whitehouse on this one. The liberal mood back in the '60s was that sex was pleasurable and wholesome and shouldn't be seen as dirty and wicked. The Pill allowed women to make choices for themselves. Of course, that meant the risk of making the wrong choice. But we all hoped girls would grow to handle the new freedoms wisely. Then everything came to be about money: so now sex is about money, too. Why else sexualise the clothes of little girls, run TV channels of naked wives, have sex magazines edging out the serious stuff on newsagents' shelves? It's money that's corrupted us and women are being used and are even collaborating."

In August 2014, Bakewell was one of 200 public figures who were signatories to a letter to The Guardian expressing their hope that Scotland would vote to remain part of the United Kingdom in September's referendum on that issue.

In March 2016, she commented in The Sunday Times that anorexia is connected with a general narcissism in 21st century western culture, and that "no-one has anorexia in societies where there is not enough food". Despite agreement with her assessment in some media, her comments also provoked strong criticism from social and print media, and an apology for hurt caused from Bakewell herself.

In April 2020, during the COVID-19 pandemic, Bakewell said that the Government should stop treating the elderly like "a crazy old people's club" and allow them to make their own choices on how best to ensure their personal safety.

== Humanist views and beliefs ==
In 2017, Bakewell was named Humanist UK's Humanist of the Year in recognition of her achievements in broadcasting and her services to humanism and other good causes. She is a patron of the Humanists UK.

In 2020, she recorded a message as part of a special set of audio broadcasts for Prison Radio in response to the COVID-19 pandemic. Speaking about humanism and humour, she shared two of her favourite poems, one by Roger McGough and the other, Spike Milligan. She said:

‘Humanists don’t believe in the afterlife or supernatural things like miracles and so on, but they do believe in the values of humanity. They believe in the absolute value of commitment to our fellow man, concern for each other, and making the world a better place. That’s what we believe in. And we believe in the here and now, rather than in some fictitious world, beyond which nobody can really explain to us... I’m here to speak of the sort of hope that you can have in your life... and there’s nothing that cheers you up as much as humour. Humour is a great quality of human existence, and it gives much pleasure to people in life.’

Later in 2020, she spoke on Humanists UK’s podcast What I Believe, sharing memories of her upbringing and career as well as her love for the arts. Talking about her journey to humanism, she said:

‘As I grew up, I did begin to question things because curiosity makes you wonder why everybody believes this. I enrolled for confirmation and we had to have classes to instruct us presided over by a bishop. I remember as we finished one session saying, "How do we know any of this is true?" and there was a quiet gasp among the other children because I was stepping outside accepted behaviour and nobody did ask that kind of thing. I think one of the answers was the weight of tradition. How could it not be true if two thousand years had not demonstrated that its survival power verified the actual truth of the message? I took that in with a certain reservation and then, of course, they went on about the values that we'd learned through it and the values which, of course, I still share because those values are very universal. Then I went to university, at which point I collided with people of all sorts of different faiths and indeed a good deal of scepticism on everybody's part. That was very good for me because I was studying economics and then I studied history under Eric Hobsbawm, who was a distinguished Marxist and a very brilliant mind. He didn't bring his Marxism directly to bear on my tuition but I always remember him saying, whenever I made some statement, "And what is your evidence for that statement? What is this based on? What are you going to offer up in your essay, or your account, as a justification for making such a remark?"... That started to impinge on my rather parochial set of beliefs and I started asking around for evidence and I never found satisfactory answers.’

On finding humanism, she said:

‘I didn't know it was called humanism at the time and indeed, when I speak to people who say to me, "Humanism? What on earth is humanism?" and I set out what it is, they say, "Oh, well, that's what I am!". So there are a lot of people walking this planet who are behaving, I'm glad to say, in accordance with humanist beliefs without actually giving it that name.’

== Honours ==
She was appointed a Commander of the Order of the British Empire (CBE) in the 1999 Birthday Honours and was Chairman of the British Film Institute from 2000 to 2002. She was promoted to Dame Commander of the Order of the British Empire (DBE) in the 2008 Birthday Honours.

In 2007, she was awarded the Honorary degree of Doctor of Letters (D.Litt.) from the University of Chester. On 20 July 2011, Bakewell was made an honorary graduate at the University of Essex (DU Essex).

Bakewell has also received honorary degrees from Queen Margaret University, Edinburgh (2005), Royal Holloway, University of London, University of the Arts London (2008), Staffordshire University (2009), Lancaster University (2010), Newcastle University (2011), Open University (2010) and Manchester Metropolitan University (2013). She was made an Honorary Fellow of Newnham College, Cambridge, in 2016.

In 2011, she was appointed Baroness Bakewell of Stockport.

== Personal life ==
Bakewell's autobiography, The Centre of the Bed, was published in 2003 and concentrates on her experiences as a woman in the male-dominated media industry. It also details the extramarital affair Bakewell had with playwright Harold Pinter (between 1962 and 1969), while she was married to Michael Bakewell (the marriage lasted from 1955 to 1972) and Pinter was married to the actress Vivien Merchant. The affair was the basis for Pinter's 1978 play Betrayal, adapted in 1983 as a film. In 2017, Keeping in Touch, a play first written by Bakewell in 1978 in response to Betrayal, premiered on BBC Radio 4.

In 1975, she married Jack Emery, a British director, writer and producer for stage, TV and radio, who was 12 years her junior. The couple divorced in 2001. Bakewell said, "The age difference did matter, but other things mattered more."

In January 2023, Bakewell announced that she had been diagnosed with colon cancer.

== Legacy ==
The Joan Bakewell Archive is housed at the British Library. The papers can be accessed through the British Library catalogue.

== See also ==
- List of atheists in film, radio, television and theatre
