= Ellie Crisell =

British journalist and television presenter

- Born: Ellen Jane Crisell; 19 July 1976 (age 49); Chester-le-Street, County Durham, England
- Occupations: Journalist, presenter
- Notable credit(s): Newsround; BBC News Summary; BBC News; South East Today
- Spouse: Ben Moore (m. 2015)
- Children: 3

Ellen Jane Crisell (born 19 July 1976) is an English journalist and television presenter working for the BBC. Crisell has presented the BBC One 8:00 pm news summary, and is a relief presenter on the BBC regional news programme BBC South East Today and also BBC News Channel. She was formerly the main presenter of children's news programme Newsround on CBBC and Newsround Extra. Ellie has also appeared on the celebrity edition of Total Wipeout Great Britain.

== Early life ==
Crisell attended Dame Allan's Girls School, Newcastle upon Tyne, before going on to the University of Birmingham, then gaining an MA in Broadcast Journalism at London's City University.

== Career ==
Crisell worked for The Mail on Sunday for a year, and then for a year in radio, before joining the ITV regional station, Tyne Tees Television, as a reporter and newsreader for North East Tonight.

=== Newsround ===
She began as a Newsround presenter in February 2003 shortly after previous chief anchor Becky Jago's departure. Significant stories that Crisell reported included the 2004 Indian Ocean earthquake and tsunami and she travelled to Indonesia to see the effects of the disaster. She also travelled to Athens in Greece to give daily reports on the 2004 Summer Olympics. In addition to serious reports, she also presented more light-hearted stories, including a report on the Harry Potter-inspired rise of magic in the UK that ended with her being sawn in half by a magician in an illusion called Clearly Impossible.

Crisell has not presented Newsround since returning from maternity leave, and her profile has been taken off the show's website.

=== BBC News ===
On 12 September 2006, Crisell appeared on Newsnight, her first non-sports based appearance on BBC News main output.

In November 2006, Crisell started relief presenting for BBC News.

Following a second maternity leave in 2015, Crisell began presenting South East Today that broadcast to areas of Kent, East Sussex, and parts of West Sussex and Surrey, as a stand-in presenter from July onwards.

Media offices
Preceded by Kate Silverton	Main Presenter of BBC News 8pm Summary; 2008–2015	Succeeded by Rotation
Preceded by New Post	Deputy Presenter of BBC News 8pm Summary; 2007–2008	Succeeded by Riz Lateef
