= Sky World News =

Overnight television news programme, broadcast on Sky News

- Genre: News
- Presented by: Kimberley Leonard
- Opening theme: Sky News theme
- Country of origin: United Kingdom

Production
- Production location: Studio 6, Sky Studios
- Camera setup: Multi-camera
- Running time: 150 Minutes (03:00am-05:30am)

Original release
- Network: Sky News
- Release: 2005 – 2020

Sky World News is a weekday non-stop early morning news programme, broadcast between 2005 and 2020 which aired during the early morning GMT on Sky News and was broadcast around the world. The programme is presented primarily by Kimberley Leonard.

== Broadcast ==
At the time of its last programme, Sky World News broadcast from 3 am GMT on Weekdays in the United Kingdom. When it launched the programme was initially two hours long and aired from 4 am until 6am GMT.

In March 2009, the programme added an extra hour, now starting an hour earlier at 3 am GMT. The time slot changed once more in 2016 with the programme typically ran from 3 am until 5:30 am, with the 5:30 am-6 am gap being filled with a re-transmission of the previous evening's Press Preview.

On the weekends, Sky World News did not air. Instead the 3-6 am slot consisted of generic Sky News branded bulletins and in later years, a documentary usually airs in the 4am hour. The Press Preview repeat did usually air 5:30am 7 days a week.

== History ==
The programme started in the summer of 2005; the original presenter was Anjali Rao who is now an anchor with CNN. The programme employed its own sports presenter, Graeme Winch, who reads the sport live (all other overnight sports bulletins are recorded). The programme also features an international weather forecast, which the presenter reads out over graphics of a world map.

In the past the team has made use of content from American broadcasters in the back half hour segments. It also had Henry Ridgwell among the previous reporting team for the programme.

For many years, the back half hours in this time slot are known as 'Sky World News and Business Review' and contain further international news stories and more in depth business coverage. Despite this little difference in content, the two half hours were branded separately.

The executive producer of Sky World News was John Gumbley until his departure from Sky News in 2015 after 27 years with the broadcaster.

Lukwesa Burak is one of the most notable presenters of the programme. Burak was the main presenter of Sky World News after joining at Sky News in 2006, she left in 2012 however returned in late 2013. Burak departed once more in June 2015.

Kimberley Leonard joined Sky News in 2015 and became the primary anchor for the programme, typically anchoring most Monday-Thursday programmes. A role Leonard remained in until the demise of the programme. At the time of the programmes final air date, other frequent anchors of the slot included Sam Naz, Nick Quraishi and Vanessa Baffoe.

The programme title was dropped from the schedule in early 2020, when Sky adopted a stripped back schedule owing to the Coronavirus pandemic and subsequent lockdown restrictions and safety mitigations.

The programme often made use of other freelance news presenters or Sky reporters to cover during holiday or absence.
