= Michael Buerk =

British journalist and newsreader (born 1946)

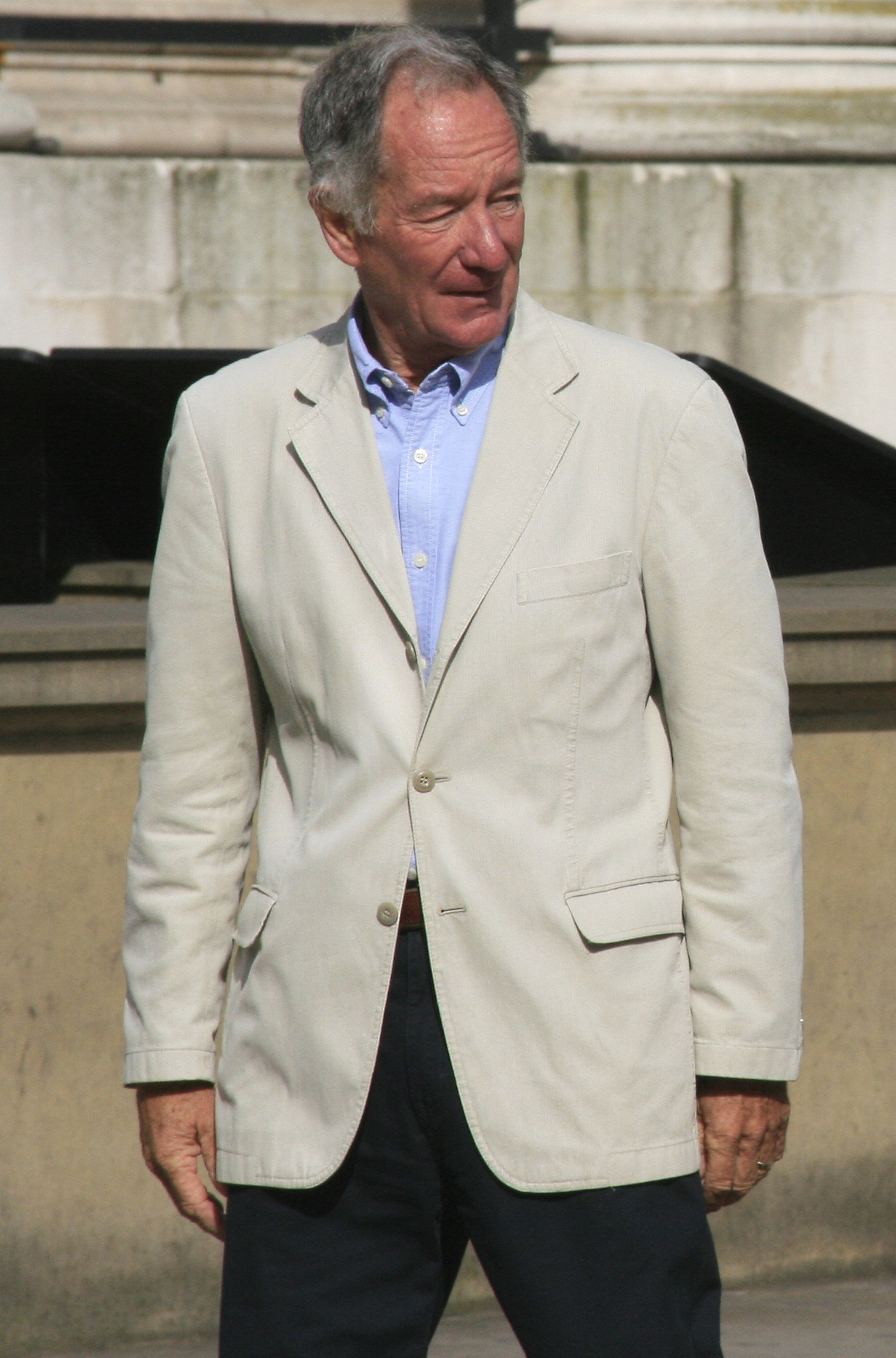
- Buerk in 2012
- Born: Michael Duncan Buerk; 18 February 1946 (age 80); Solihull, Warwickshire, England
- Education: UWI Cardiff
- Occupations: TV presenter, newsreader, journalist
- Years active: 1970–present
- Notable credit(s): BBC News; Britain's Secret Treasures; 999; Heir Hunters
- Spouse: Christine Lilley (m. 1968)
- Children: 2, including Roland

Michael Duncan Buerk (/bɜːrk/; born 18 February 1946) is a British journalist and newsreader. He presented BBC News from 1973 to 2002 and has been the host of BBC Radio 4's Moral Maze since 1990. He was also the presenter of BBC One's docudrama 999 from 1992 to 2003. From 2017, Buerk also presented the TV programme Royal Recipes which ran for two series.

== Early life ==
Buerk was born on 18 February 1946, in St. Philomena's Nursing Home, Solihull. He moved to Vancouver as a young child before returning to the West Midlands after the failure of his parents' marriage, when Buerk was three. He attended Solihull School, an independent school in the West Midlands where he was a member of the Combined Cadet Force and represented the school on the sports field.

Buerk's hopes of a career in the Royal Air Force were dashed when he failed an eyesight test at the selection centre. He briefly worked as a hod carrier.

== Reporter and newsreader ==
Buerk began his career in journalism with the Bromsgrove Messenger, South Wales Echo (he shared a house with Sue Lawley in Cardiff), and the Daily Mail. In 1970, he joined BBC Radio Bristol, where he was the first voice heard on air, before becoming a network reporter for BBC News in 1973.

From 1983 to 1987, Buerk was the BBC's South Africa correspondent during the dying years of apartheid in the country. Buerk's uncompromising reports on the brutalities of the regime resulted in the South African government expelling him from the country after four years in the post.

Buerk's reporting of the Ethiopian famine in October 1984 inspired the Band Aid charity single "Do They Know It's Christmas?" and the following year's Live Aid concerts. His report is regarded as a watershed moment in crisis reporting that influenced modern coverage.

Buerk became the anchor for the BBC Nine O'Clock News and BBC News at Ten. He presented the first BBC News bulletin of the 2000s at 0100 GMT on 1 January 2000.

Buerk announced his semi-retirement from BBC News in 2002, stating he would continue to host other programmes. Despite retirement, he continued to appear on BBC News as an occasional relief presenter until 2004.

== Other work ==
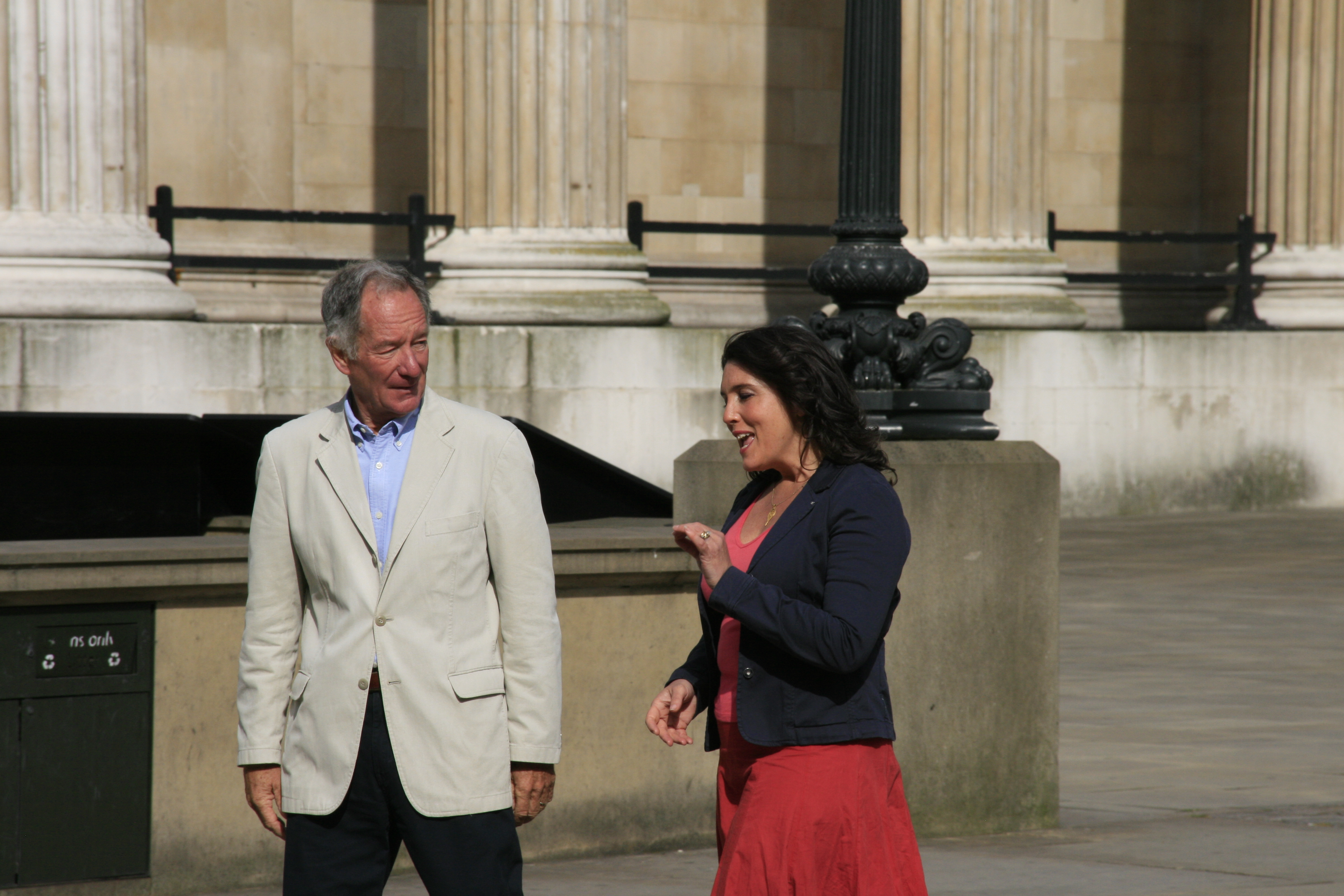
Buerk with Bettany Hughes during the filming of Britain's Secret Treasures

In 2010, Buerk narrated Sky1 reality show Pineapple Dance Studios. Buerk has also made five guest appearances on the BBC's The One Show in April and September 2010. He has also appeared as a fill-in presenter for Jason Manford on six occasions.

Since July 2012, Buerk has co-presented ITV's Britain's Secret Treasures with Bettany Hughes, looking at fifty of the most remarkable archaeological finds made by the British public. On 6 October 2013, he began hosting Inside the National Trust, a new documentary series.

Buerk has hosted BBC Radio 4's Moral Maze since 1990 and The Choice since 1998. On 22 October 2014, the BBC apologised for the language used in Buerk's early morning trail for that evening's Moral Maze in which he began: "Nobody comes out of the Ched Evans rape case with any credit – not the victim who'd drunk so much she could barely stand, nor the two footballers who had sex with her in the most sordid of circumstances." Katie Russell, from Rape Crisis England and Wales, accused him of practising "victim-blaming". She commented: "To infer that being drunk is in any way 'morally' comparable to committing the serious and violent crime of rape is deeply offensive."

In 2013, Buerk voiced a Marmite advert in which spoof rescue teams rescue lost forgotten jars at the back of cupboards and fridges. Despite receiving a number of complaints the advert continued.

Beginning on 16 November 2014, Buerk took part in the fourteenth series of I'm a Celebrity...Get Me Out of Here! On 3 December 2014, he was the third celebrity to be eliminated in the public vote.

== Charity work ==
On 28 July 2007, Buerk appeared on a celebrity version of Who Wants to Be a Millionaire? with Jennie Bond to raise money for NCH, the children's charity. Between them they won £64,000. He is a supporter of the British Red Cross and in October 2008 came out in support of an alternative reality game, Traces of Hope, which the charity developed.

On the BBC's Children in Need, Buerk performed several times as part of an ensemble of BBC News presenters. In 2004, he performed as Duran Duran with Andrew Marr, Rob Bonnet, Bill Turnbull, and Jeremy Bowen.

== Opinions ==
In August 2005, Buerk said in a Radio Times interview that the "shift in the balance of power between the sexes" has gone too far, we need to "admit the problem", and that men are now little more than "sperm donors". In particular, Buerk objected to the many women now in senior positions within the BBC. Former newsreader Anna Ford commented: "He's a dear old-fashioned chauvinist of the first order."

An article was published in anticipation of Buerk's 45-minute TV-essay, "Michael Buerk on What Are Men For?", which was part of a series on Channel Five, Don't Get Me Started! broadcast on Tuesday 23 August 2005. Guardian television reviewer Sam Wollaston thought Buerk had "been thoroughly, and quite rightly, crucified" in the pre-publicity. At the Hay-on-Wye literary festival earlier in the year, Buerk criticised contemporary newsreaders for being overpaid autocue-reading "lame brains".

At the end of 2012, Buerk despaired of the state of Britain and of the BBC. Of the corporation's coverage of the Thames River Pageant celebrating Britain and the 60th anniversary of Queen Elizabeth II's accession to the throne, he wrote: "The Dunkirk Little Ships, the most evocative reminders of this country's bravest hour, were ignored so that a pneumatic bird-brain from Strictly Come Dancing could talk to transvestites in Battersea Park."

In an article for Radio Times in April 2014 about 'grey power' in television, Buerk referred to presenters who had gone to employment tribunals over claims of age discrimination. Several older female presenters have won cases over wrongful dismissal. Buerk wrote: "If you got the job in the first place mainly because you look nice, I can't see why you should keep it when you don't." He did though quote Angela Rippon who spoke positively about older people (including herself) being able to continue their careers in television. Responding to Buerk in The Guardian, presenter Miriam O'Reilly, who won her case for unfair dismissal on age grounds in 2011, said: "The rules that apply to women in TV don't apply to men. Men can age, women can't. Women have to be attractive, men don't."

In August 2019 it was reported that Buerk thought that the obese should be allowed to die an early death in order to save the NHS money. In an article in the Radio Times Buerk suggested allowing deaths due to obesity could be a benefit to society.

In October 2024, in an interview with BBC Radio 4, Buerk accused the BBC of "excessive media coverage" following the death of One Direction singer Liam Payne. He was criticised by some social media users for referring to Payne as a "drugged up, faded, boyband singer" in the same interview.

== Portrayal in media ==
Buerk's life and career has been the subject of a comedy musical, Buerk! The Newsical, which debuted in London at the Network Theatre in May 2013.

== Personal life ==
Buerk lives in Guildford, Surrey, with his wife Christine, with whom he has twin sons. One of his sons, Roland, formerly a BBC journalist too, survived the South Asian tsunami on Boxing Day 2004, and was also in Tokyo when the 2011 Tōhoku earthquake and tsunami struck.

Buerk was awarded the Golden Nymph award at the Monte Carlo festival for his reports on the famine from Korem in Ethiopia, first broadcast on 23 October 1984. The footage of the famine was shot by Mohamed Amin.

In 1991, Buerk was awarded an honorary MA by the University of Bath.

On 18 July 2013, Buerk was awarded an honorary doctorate at Surrey University's awards ceremony in Guildford Cathedral.

== Filmography ==
Television

- BBC Points West – reporter/presenter
- BBC Midlands Today – executive producer
- BBC South Today – reporter
- BBC Nine O'Clock News (1976–2000)
  (Industrial correspondent, 1976–77; energy/Scotland correspondent 1977–81; South Africa correspondent 1983–87; main presenter 1988–2000)
- BBC Ten O'Clock News (2000–2003)
- BBC One O'Clock News (1986–2003)
- BBC Breakfast
- 999 (1992–2003)
- A Royal Wedding – HRH Prince Edward, Earl of Wessex & Sophie Rhys-Jones (June 1999) – co-presenter with Sue Barker at Windsor
- Total Eclipse (August 1999) – the main presenter on the historic solar eclipse in Cornwall on BBC One
- 2000 Today – co-presenter
- The One Show (September 2010) – stand-in presenter
- Pineapple Dance Studios (2010) – narrator
- Britain's Secret Treasures (2012–13) – co-presenter
- Inside the National Trust (2013) – presenter
- Britain's Secret Homes (2013) – co-presenter
- I'm a Celebrity...Get Me Out of Here! (2014) – contestant
- Pompeii with Michael Buerk (2016) – presenter
- Royal Recipes (2017–present) – presenter
- Heir Hunters (2017–present) – presenter
- Britain by Boat (2018) – co-presenter
- Celebrity 5 go Barging (2019) – co-presenter

Radio

- The Moral Maze (since 1990) – presenter
- The Choice (since 1998) – presenter
