= Sally Nugent =

British television presenter

- Born: 5 August 1971 (age 55); Birkenhead, Cheshire, England
- Education: Upton Hall School FCJ
- Alma mater: University of Huddersfield
- Occupations: Journalist; newsreader; television presenter
- Known for: BBC Breakfast
- Spouse: Gavin Hawthorn (separated)
- Children: 1

Sally Nugent (born 5 August 1971) is an English journalist, newsreader and television presenter. Since October 2021, she has been one of the main presenters for BBC Breakfast.

== Early life and education ==
Nugent was born on 5 August 1971 on the Wirral Peninsula and was educated at Upton Hall School FCJ. She graduated with a Bachelor of Arts degree in communication arts and French from the University of Huddersfield.

== Career ==
Her first media role was at BBC Radio Merseyside before moving on to report on and read the sports news on BBC North West Tonight. In 2003, she became a sports reporter for BBC News, appearing on national bulletins, before becoming a sports news presenter on the BBC News Channel (known at the time as BBC News 24). There, she travelled to Germany for the 2006 FIFA World Cup, anchoring Sportsday from there. Nugent then spent a period as a news correspondent on TV and radio, and as a relief presenter on the BBC News Channel.

In November 2011, Nugent began co-presenting BBC Breakfast on a freelance basis, filling in when regular hosts were unavailable. From April 2012, she presented sports bulletins alongside Mike Bushell on Breakfast following the programme's move to its new location at Media City in Salford. She established herself as one of the regular co-presenters of the Breakfast team after appearing on the Christmas Eve 2012 edition with Bill Turnbull, through to September 2021.

On 27 October 2021, it was announced that Nugent would become a permanent main presenter of BBC Breakfast alongside Dan Walker, Charlie Stayt, and Naga Munchetty. She replaced Louise Minchin following Minchin's departure after 20 years on the programme.

Nugent currently presents BBC Breakfast from Monday to Wednesday every week, alongside Jon Kay.

It was announced that she would dance with Graziano Di Prima for the 2023 Strictly Come Dancing Christmas Special.

== Personal life ==
Nugent was married to businessman Gavin Hawthorn; together, they have one son. In May 2023, it was announced that Nugent and Hawthorn had separated after 13 years of marriage. Nugent lives in Hale, Greater Manchester.
