= Chris Vacher =

British television presenter (born 1951)

Christopher George Vacher (born 3 December 1951) is a British television presenter, best known as a long-serving main anchor of BBC West's flagship regional news programme Points West for 28 years.

== Early life ==
Brought up near Axminster on the Somerset-Devon border, Vacher attended Sherborne School and the Britannia Royal Naval College, Dartmouth (in the same year as Prince Charles) before joining the Royal Navy in 1969 as a seaman officer.

== Broadcasting career ==
Vacher joined the BBC in 1981 working for Radio Bristol before becoming a freelance reporter and newsreader for Points West a year later. He joined the main presenting team in 1983 and holds the record as the programme's longest serving main presenter. Vacher, a past winner of the Royal Television Society's 'Regional TV Personality of the Year in the West' award, has also worked on various documentary specials as part of the regional current affairs series Close Up West.

Vacher presented Points West for the final time on Friday 9 December 2011. Vacher was then the longest-serving regional presenter who had worked for the BBC.
