= Dominic Cotton =

English journalist

Dominic Cotton is an English journalist.

== Biography ==
Born in Cheshire, but moving to London when he was two, Cotton trained and worked as an actor, gaining parts on The Bill and in London's West End theatre.

After two years, he undertook a post-graduate diploma at the Centre for Journalism Studies at Cardiff University, and started his broadcast career as a regional news reporter in Plymouth for the BBC in 1995.

Cotton then chose to become freelance to pursue a career in sports broadcast journalism, moving to London to specialise in sport including spells at digital TV network Channel 1, Sky Sports, Five and ITV.

Cotton rejoined the BBC in 1998 as a sports producer and presenter on overnight production shifts for BBC Breakfast, before joining BBC News 24 as a sports presenter. He also reported for Football Focus.

== Personal life ==
Cotton's former partner is BBC Breakfast presenter Susanna Reid; the couple and their three sons lived in Lambeth, south London. They announced they had split in February 2014.
