= Sunday Morning Live (British TV programme) =

British current affairs TV series

- Presented by: Susanna Reid (2010–2011); Samira Ahmed (2012–2013); Sian Williams (2014–2015); Naga Munchetty (2016); Sean Fletcher (2017–); Emma Barnett (2017); Cherry Healey (2018); Ria Hebden (2019); Sally Phillips (2020–); Holly Hamilton (2022–)
- Country of origin: United Kingdom
- Original language: English

Production
- Executive producer: Richard Pattinson
- Production locations: Studio V, Broadcasting House
- Running time: 60 minutes
- Production companies: BBC (2010–2016); BBC Studios (2016–2022); Tern TV (2022–); Green Inc. (2022–)

Original release
- Network: BBC One
- Release: 11 July 2010 – present

Related
- The Big Questions

Sunday Morning Live is a religious and current affairs discussion programme. The first series aired on BBC One from July 2010 to November 2010 after the end of the third series of The Big Questions. It currently airs in blocks of episodes several times a year.

== Format ==
The programme is produced at MediaCityUK, in Salford, United Kingdom by BBC Studios and features studio guests, filmed inserts and interactive viewer input from text messages, videophone, Skype, telephone and e-mail. Its debut edition included a guest appearance by ex-EastEnders actress Brooke Kinsella.

For the 2014 series, the programme relocated to Broadcasting House in London (into studio V, the studio The One Show is broadcast from) with new presenter Sian Williams. The new format includes the old style discussions of religious and ethical questions and also new one-to-one interviews with special guests. Despite being broadcast from London, the programme's production base remains in Belfast.

== Presenters ==
Susanna Reid, a BBC Breakfast presenter, presented the first two series of the programme. When Sunday Morning Live was on air Reid did not present Breakfast at the weekends as she had to be in Belfast. In May 2012 Reid announced on Twitter that former Channel 4 News presenter Samira Ahmed would be hosting the third series when it returned in June 2012. Ahmed continued to present the fourth series.

On 4 November 2012, Kate Silverton covered Samira Ahmed's presenting duties during an absence. On 4 August 2013, Sally Magnusson stood in for Ahmed when she was again indisposed, and on 27 October 2013 Katie Derham covered.

In June 2014 former BBC Breakfast presenter Sian Williams was confirmed as presenter for the next series.

In November 2015, Sian Williams announced that she was leaving the BBC to replace Emma Crosby on 5 News and it was announced prior to the 2016 series that she would be replaced by BBC Breakfast presenter Naga Munchetty.

In June 2017, it was announced that Sean Fletcher and Emma Barnett were taking over presenting duties for the programme. They were joined by roving reporters including Wendy Robbins and Mehreen Baig. Cherry Healey replaced Barnett in 2018, followed by Ria Hebden in 2019, Sally Phillips in 2020 and Holly Hamilton in 2022.

== Music ==
Rob May and Simon Hill wrote and produced the theme tune for Series 1–5. Kam Frantic composed the theme tune for Series 6–8.

== Competitive Tender ==
As part of the BBC's "competitive tender" policy, the company put the tender rights for the programme up for auction in September 2021. The tender would allow for 24 episodes to be produced in the next two years. BBC Studios, who produced the series at the time, decided not to bid on the rights.

On 16 March 2022, it was announced that two independent producers – Tern TV and Green Inc., had won the competitive tender to produce the programme as a co-production.
