= Susanna Reid =

English television presenter (born 1970)

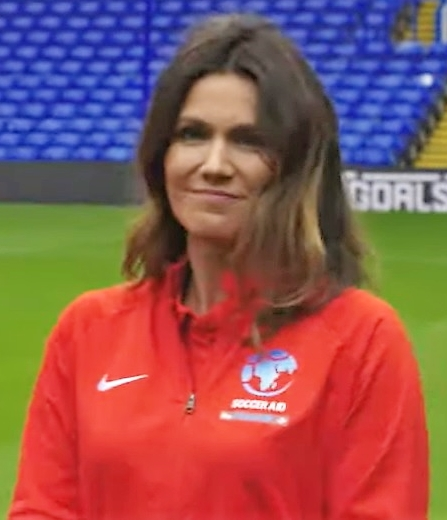
- Reid in 2019
- Born: Susanna Victoria Reid; 10 December 1970 (age 55); Purley, London, England
- Education: Croydon High School; St Paul's Girls' School; University of Bristol; Cardiff University
- Occupations: Television presenter; journalist
- Years active: 1982–present
- Employer(s): BBC (1994–2014); ITV (2014–present)
- Notable credit(s): BBC Breakfast (2001–2014); Sunday Morning Live (2010–2011); Good Morning Britain (2014–present)
- Partners: Dominic Cotton (1998–2014); Steve Parish (2018–2019)
- Children: 3

Susanna Victoria Reid (born 10 December 1970) is an English television presenter and journalist. She was a co-presenter of BBC Breakfast from 2001 until 2014 alongside Bill Turnbull and Charlie Stayt. She also presented Sunday Morning Live on BBC One from 2010 to 2011. In 2013, she finished as a runner-up on the 11th series of Strictly Come Dancing alongside dance-partner Kevin Clifton. Since its launch in 2014, Reid has been the lead presenter of the ITV Breakfast programme Good Morning Britain alongside Kate Garraway, Richard Madeley, Ed Balls and formerly Piers Morgan and Ben Shephard.

== Early life and education ==
Susanna Victoria Reid was born on 10 December 1970 in Purley, South London, and grew up in Warlingham, Surrey. She is youngest of three children, with two older brothers. She was educated at the independent Croham Hurst School, from 1975 to 1981, followed by Croydon High School (1981–87) and St Paul's Girls' School (1987–89) in Hammersmith. Her parents separated and divorced when she was aged nine. Her father was a management consultant and her mother was a nurse.

Reid appeared as an actress while an adolescent, performing in a stage production of Agatha Christie's Spider's Web (1982) with Shirley Anne Field, and later alongside Peter Barkworth and Harriet Walter in The Price (1985) on Channel 4.

She studied politics and philosophy at the University of Bristol (1989–92), where she was editor of Epigram, the student newspaper, and then trained as a journalist at Cardiff University's Centre for Journalism, earning a postgraduate diploma in broadcast journalism.

== Career ==
Reid began her career as a news producer at BBC Radio Bristol in 1994, and become a producer for BBC Radio 5 Live in 1996. She later joined BBC News 24, where she spent two years as a reporter. When the 23:00 presenter did not arrive one night, Reid became a stand-in presenter for an hour (while three months pregnant with her first child), which turned into a permanent position. Reid first appeared on BBC Breakfast in December 2001 as a stand-in presenter. She became one of the main presenters on BBC Breakfast in May 2006 to cover Mishal Husain's maternity leave. Husain did not return to the programme, moving instead to BBC World and the BBC Weekend News. Reid subsequently became a main presenter on Fridays, Saturdays and Sundays, presenting with Bill Turnbull and later Charlie Stayt from January 2008. She later became the main presenter on Mondays, Tuesdays and Wednesdays, presenting with Bill Turnbull, a role she held from 2012, when she replaced lead presenter Sian Williams. In 2010, Reid stepped down from presenting Breakfast on Saturdays and Sundays to take a role on a new programme Sunday Morning Live. After the final episode of the first series on 21 November 2010, she resumed her weekend presenting duties on BBC Breakfast within two weeks.

Reid was also previously the regular newsreader during the headlines on The Andrew Marr Show. On 16 May 2010, she stood in briefly for Andrew Marr for the Sunday newspaper review, when he arrived late for the programme after interviewing the new Prime Minister David Cameron. Reid handed back to Marr following the paper review. Reid presented the main show for the first time on 10 March 2013 following Marr's extended absence after suffering a stroke in January 2013. On 22 February 2009, Reid presented the BBC's live coverage of the 2009 Oscars from Los Angeles and also presented coverage of the 2010 Oscars on 7 March.

In 2013, Reid took part in Strictly Come Dancing (series 11). Her professional dance partner was Kevin Clifton. The couple finished as one of the joint runners-up.

On 31 December 2013, Reid presented the New Year Live programme on BBC One.

In February 2014, it was reported that ITV was attempting to recruit Reid for its new breakfast programme, with a £1 million salary. Reid had previously rejected claims of moving to ITV in December 2013, during her Strictly Come Dancing stint, saying she would "bleed BBC" if cut open. On 3 March 2014, the BBC confirmed Reid's move to ITV to front rival breakfast programme Good Morning Britain, which replaced its former breakfast show Daybreak. She is the lead presenter alongside Ed Balls and Richard Madeley.

On 19 December 2014, Reid appeared on a special Text Santa episode of Tipping Point with fellow Good Morning Britain presenters. In 2017, Reid co-presented Save Money: Good Food alongside Matt Tebbutt.

In October 2018, Reid had a cameo appearance in Hollyoaks.

In July 2020, Reid appeared on Celebrity Gogglebox alongside barrister and TV judge Robert Rinder.

On 3 May 2022, Reid interviewed then-Prime Minister Boris Johnson live on Good Morning Britain.

In 2023 Reid appeared as a Sitter in Sky Arts' Portrait Artist of the Year.

== Awards ==
In March 2014, the Television and Radio Industries Club named Reid Newsreader of the Year at its annual awards, the week after it was announced she would join ITV. In 2015, she won the same award.

In 2015, she also received an honorary fellowship from her alma mater, Cardiff University.

In February 2024, Reid won Network Presenter of the Year at the Royal Television Society Television Journalism Awards 2024.

== Personal life ==
Reid separated from partner, former sports correspondent Dominic Cotton in February 2014 after 16 years together. The couple have three sons, born in 2002, 2004, and 2005. Reid lives in Balham, south London. She is a supporter of Crystal Palace, visiting the club's Selhurst Park ground with her dance partner while taking part in Strictly Come Dancing, in 2013. In 2015, she said she suffers "very mild tinnitus". In November 2018, Reid revealed that she was in a relationship with Crystal Palace chairman Steve Parish. However, it was announced in April 2019 that the relationship had ended.

Reid is a pescetarian, something she used to discuss occasionally with chef James Martin when commenting on the dishes on Saturday Kitchen.

== Charity work ==
Reid is a regular contributor to Media Trust, a charity linking other charities to the media industry, and has hosted events for the Myotubular Trust and Voluntary Arts England. In 1998, just before she became a reporter for Breakfast News, she worked for three months in Sri Lanka as a voluntary media consultant for a charity which counsels victims of the civil war and operates orphanages and social development programmes.

On 22 April 2012, Reid took part in the London Marathon, raising money for Sport Relief, completing the course in just over five hours.

== In popular culture ==
In the 2024 BBC miniseries Kidnapped: The Chloe Ayling Story, Reid was played by Louise Delamere.

== Filmography ==
=== Television ===
Year	Title	Channel	Role	Notes
1985	The Price	Channel 4	Clare	Drama series
Late 1990s	BBC News 24	BBC News	Reporter/presenter	Began as a reporter for two years, before being promoted to presenter
2001–2014	Breakfast	BBC One	Co-presenter	With Bill Turnbull
2003–2010	TV Bingo	BBC Two	Presenter	
2010–2011	Sunday Morning Live	BBC One	Presenter	
2013	Would I lie to you?	BBC One	Herself	With Dave Myers, Jimmy Carr and Griff Rhys Jones
2013	Strictly Come Dancing	BBC One	Contestant	Runner-up
2013	New Year Live	BBC One	Co-presenter	With Gary Barlow
2014–	Good Morning Britain	ITV	Co-presenter	Monday–Thursday
2017	The Murder of Becky Watts – Police Tapes	ITV	Presenter	
2017–	Save Money: Good Food	ITV	Co-presenter	Primetime series
2018	Children Who Kill	ITV	Presenter	Documentaries for ITV's Crime & Punishment season
2018	John Worboys: The Taxi Cab Rapist	ITV	Presenter	Documentaries for ITV's Crime & Punishment season
2018	The Murder of Rhys Jones: Police Tapes	ITV	Presenter	Documentaries for ITV's Crime & Punishment season
2018	The Game Show Serial Killer: Police Tapes	ITV	Presenter	Documentaries for ITV's Crime & Punishment season
2018	Who Killed Sharon Birchwood?: Police Tapes	ITV	Presenter	Documentaries for ITV's Crime & Punishment season
2018	Hollyoaks	Channel 4	Herself	Cameo as Good Morning Britain presenter
2019	Death Row: Countdown to Execution	ITV	Presenter	Documentaries for ITV's Crime & Punishment season
2020	Celebrity Gogglebox	Channel 4	Herself	With Robert Rinder
2020	Death Row's Women with Susanna Reid	ITV	Presenter	ITV Crime & Punishment documentary
2021	The Real Manhunt: The Night Stalker	ITV	Presenter	ITV documentary
2022	British Grandma On Death Row with Susanna Reid	ITV	Presenter	ITV documentary
2023	Portrait Artist of the Year	Sky Arts	Guest	One episode
2023	Can Britain Get Talking?	ITV	Guest reporter	Tonight; one episode
2026	Secret Service	ITV	Herself	Cameo as Good Morning Britain presenter

=== Film ===
Year	Title	Role	Notes
2016	Trolls	Grandma Rosiepuff	UK release only

== Honours ==
=== Scholastic ===
Chancellor, visitor, governor, rector and fellowships

Location	Date	School	Position
Wales	13 July 2015 – present	Cardiff University	Honorary Fellowship

Media offices
Preceded by Mishal Husain	Deputy Presenter of BBC Breakfast; 2006–2012	Succeeded by Louise Minchin
Preceded by Sian Williams	Main Presenter of BBC Breakfast; 2012–2014	Succeeded by Louise Minchin
Position established	Main presenter of Good Morning Britain; 2014–present	Incumbent
