= Ria Hebden =

British television presenter

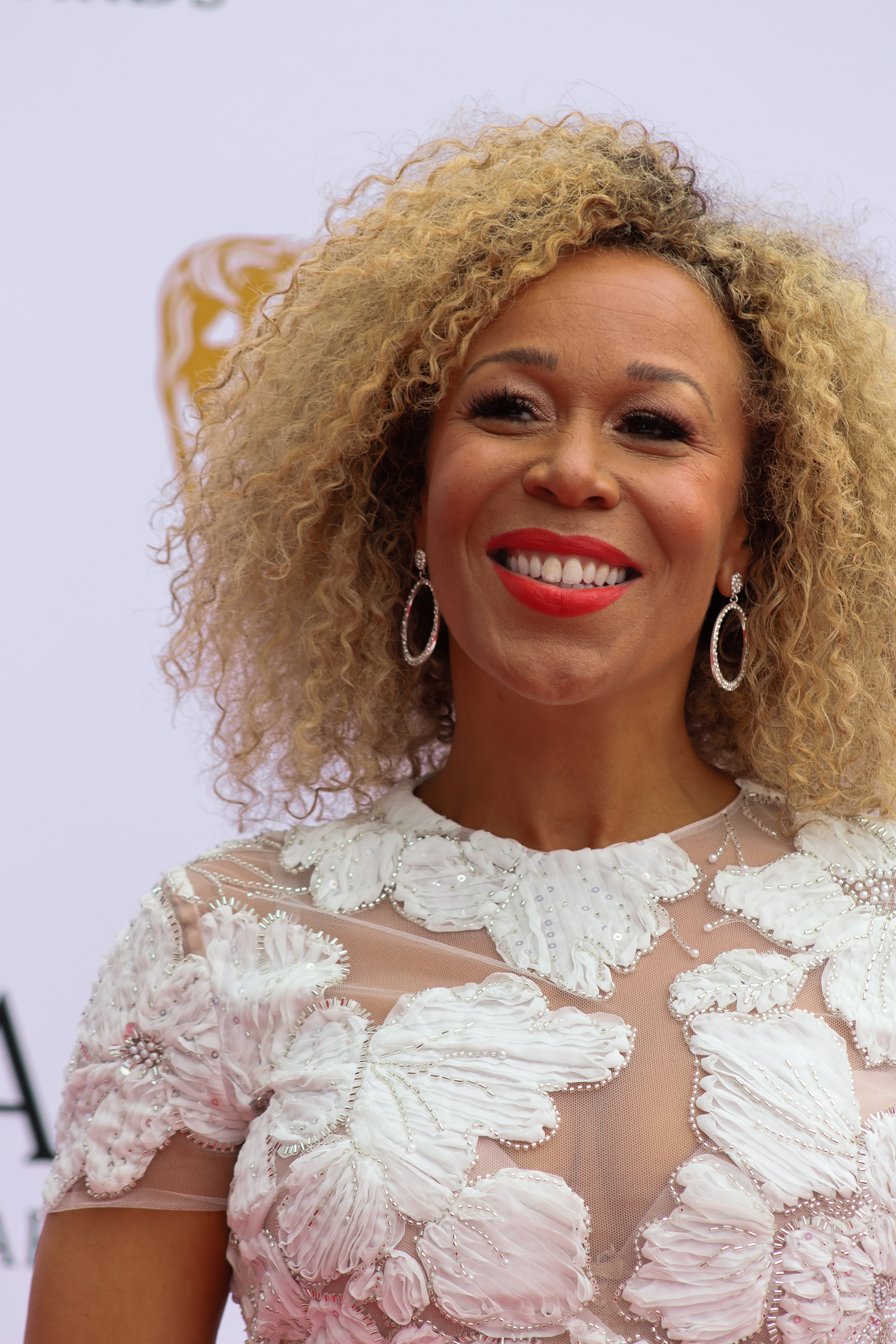
- Hebden at BAFTA Television Awards 2026
- Born: Ria Cunningham; 2 January 1983 (age 43); London, England
- Education: Brunel University London
- Occupation: Television presenter
- Years active: 2014–present
- Employers: ITV; BBC
- Known for: Sunday Morning Live (2018–); Lorraine (2019–present); BBC Radio London (2020–present)
- Spouse: Mark Hebden (m. 2012)
- Children: 2

Ria Hebden /ˈriæ/ (née Cunningham; born 2 January 1983) is an English broadcast journalist and television presenter. She has been the entertainment editor reporting on Lorraine since 2020. Since 2020, she has co-presented All Around Britain with Alex Beresford.

== Early life ==
Hebden was born on 2 January 1983. She went to Brunel University London between 2001 and 2004, graduating with a 2:1 BA Hons.

== Career ==
After graduating university, Hebden worked as a publicist for companies such as Channel 4 and Twentieth Century Fox.

Hebden founded Wonder Women TV in 2016, an inspirational women's organisation that champions diverse women who work at mid-senior level in television. She also presents a podcast The Wonder Women TV Podcast. Hebden also hosts a show on BBC Radio London. Hebden is also a patron for the MAMA Youth Project.

Hebden made history in 2020 as the first mixed heritage couple to present a BBC daytime show as she co-presented alongside Sean Fletcher. In January 2020, Hebden became the entertainment editor on Lorraine. In 2020, Hebden stepped in for Ranvir Singh on All Around Britain, co-presenting with Alex Beresford, whilst she competed in Strictly Come Dancing. In 2021, ITV commissioned another series of the show, with Hebden returning alongside Beresford as presenter.

In January 2022, Ria participated in the fourteenth series of Dancing on Ice and was eliminated second.

== Personal life ==
Hebden married her husband Mark in 2012 and together they have two children.

== Awards and nominations ==
- Nominated in the 2018 Diversity in Media Awards – Presenter of the Year
