= Holly Hamilton =

Northern Irish television presenter and journalist

Holly Hamilton is a BBC journalist and presenter who has appeared on BBC Breakfast on BBC One, the Victoria Derbyshire programme on BBC Two and the BBC News channel.

Hamilton grew up in Greyabbey in County Down, Northern Ireland, and was educated at Regent House School, Newtownards. She earned a master's degree in Politics and French from the University of Dundee.

She is married to fellow television and radio presenter Connor Phillips. Hamilton gave birth to their son, Fionn, on 21 January 2021. Hamilton and Phillips are patrons of the Northern Ireland Council for Integrated Education (NICIE) and, as part of their role, they officially opened Corran Integrated Primary School in Larne, County Antrim, in November 2019.

At the Birmingham 2022 Commonwealth Games, Hamilton fronted morning coverage of the games alongside Jason Mohammad.

She presents Sunday Morning Live on BBC One.
