= Sima Kotecha =

British television and radio journalist

- Born: 1980; Basingstoke, England
- Occupation: Journalist
- Notable credit(s): Newsbeat; PM; Today programme

Sima Kotecha (born 1980, Basingstoke) is a British television and radio journalist working for the BBC in various roles since 2003, including within war zones. Kotecha has served as the UK editor and as occasional presenter of Newsnight, and as a stand in presenter on BBC Breakfast.

== Early years ==
Sima Kotecha was born in Basingstoke and attended Richard Aldworth School Her parents are of Indian origin. She went to Surrey University in Guildford and Goldsmiths College, University of London to study for her master's degree in media and communications. Her first job was at BBC Radio Berkshire in 2003 and after that she took up an internship at the BBC's New York bureau. She worked for Talking Movies and BBC Radio 1's Newsbeat as their New York reporter from 2005 to 2010. She later worked for the PM programme on Radio 4 and as a multimedia reporter for the same network's Today programme.

== Career ==
In January 2017, Kotecha became the Midlands Correspondent of BBC News appearing regularly on television bulletins. She also presents the BBC One news bulletin at 8pm and has presented Radio 5 Live's Up All Night, 5 Live Breakfast and Drivetime and Newsday on the BBC World Service.

Kotecha has reported from Helmand Province in the conflict in Afghanistan while embedded with US Marines in Garmsiron for two weeks in December 2009. She covered the 2010 Haiti earthquake and the Syrian refugee crisis. She also covered the 2008 US presidential election, and the Oscars on multiple occasions.

While reporting live on COVID-19 restrictions in Leicester in 2020, Kotecha and her camera crew were harassed by a member of the public, Russell Rawlingson. Rawlingson was arrested and charged with racially-aggravated harassment. At Leicester Crown Court on 28 May 2021, he pleaded guilty to threatening behaviour but denied any racial element. His plea was accepted by Judge William Harbage QC and the Crown Prosecution Service. Kotecha was reported as saying she did not wish the racially-aggravated charge to go to trial. Rawlingson was ordered to be treated in hospital under the Mental Health Act 1983.

On 27 January 2022 Kotecha tweeted a photo of an email from Josie Stewart, a civil servant at the Foreign, Commonwealth and Development Office, which inadvertently included Stewart's name. Kotecha's exposure of her source resulted in Stewart losing her job with the FCDO.

Kotecha regularly reports for BBC Newsnight out on location and occasionally presents the current affairs programme from the studio, if the main regular presenters are unavailable.
