= Rangan Chatterjee =

British doctor and television presenter

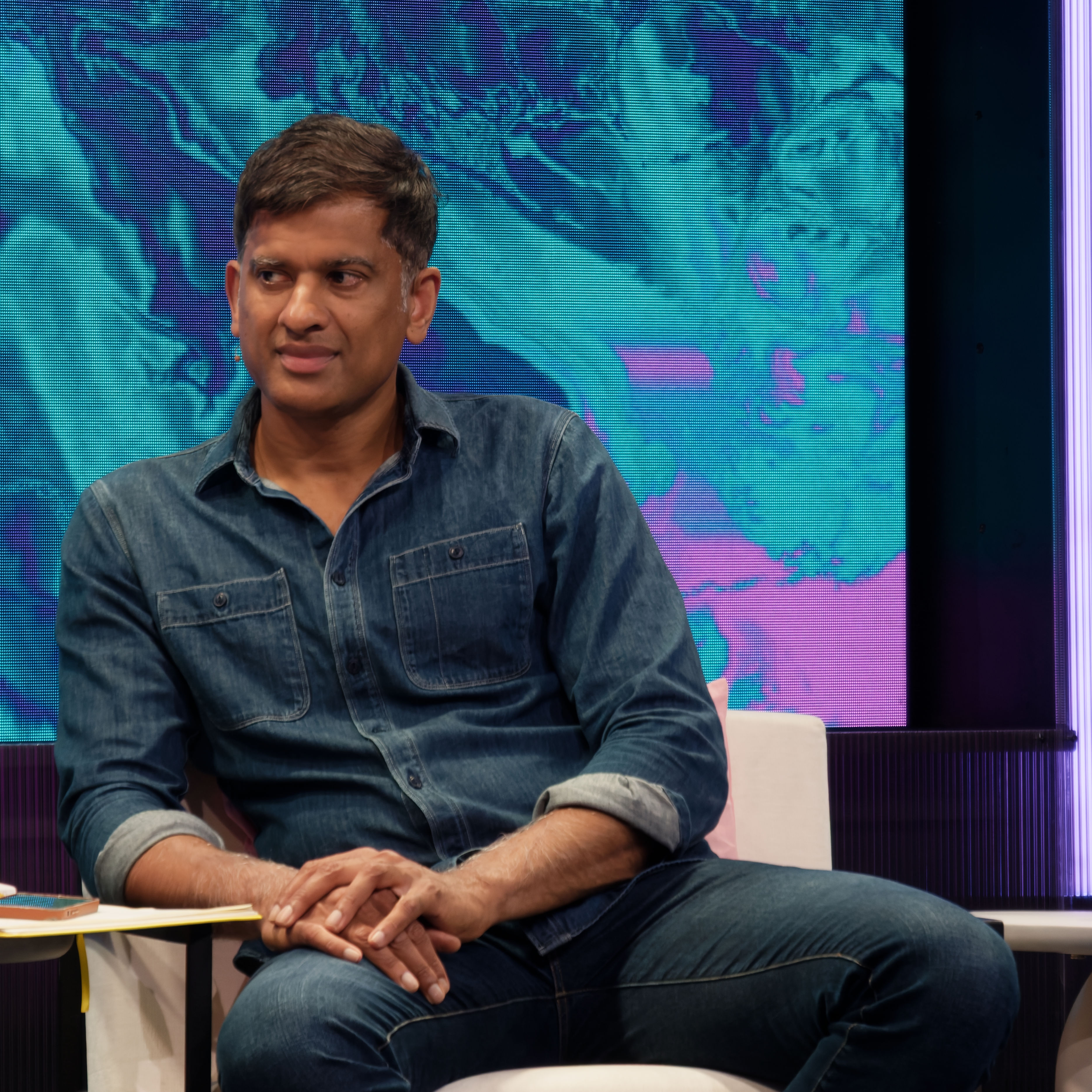
- Chatterjee in 2026
- Born: Manchester, England
- Education: University of Edinburgh Medical School
- Occupations: Former Doctor; Author; Broadcaster
- Years active: 2001–present
- Television: Doctor in the House
- Children: 2
- Parent: Tarun Chatterjee (father)
- Website: drchatterjee.com

Rangan Chatterjee is a British physician, author, television presenter and podcaster. He is best known for his TV show Doctor in the House and for being the resident doctor on BBC Breakfast and as a regular contributor to BBC Radio.

== Early life ==
Chatterjee's Bengali father, Tarun Chatterjee, came to England from Kolkata, India in the 1960s and was a consultant in genito-urinary medicine at Manchester Royal Infirmary. Chatterjee was a pupil at Manchester Grammar School from 1988 to 1995; then he attended the University of Edinburgh, where he studied Medicine and graduated in 2001 with an additional degree in immunology.

== Career ==
Chatterjee hosts the podcast "Feel Better, Live More," and has appeared on BBC Radio as a regular commentator. In 2017 he came 8th in the Pulse Power 50 list of influential GPs.

In 2017, Chatterjee appeared as a presenter on the BBC One television series Holding Back the Years.

Chatterjee is no longer a licensed practising doctor in the UK, as of 24th March 2024.

== Books ==
- The 4 Pillar Plan published on 28 December 2017
- How to Make Disease Disappear published on 11 May 2018
- The Stress Solution published on 27 December 2018
- Feel Better in 5 published on 18 December 2019
- Feel Great Lose Weight published on 31 December 2020
- Happy Mind, Happy Life: 10 Simple Ways to Feel Great Every Day published on 22 February 2022
- Make Change That Lasts: 9 Simple Ways to Break Free from the Habits That Hold You Back published on 12 January 2025

== Family ==
Chatterjee is married to Vidhaata, a barrister.
