= Roland Buerk =

English journalist

- Born: 1973 (age 52–53)
- Occupation: Journalist
- Years active: 1995–2012
- Spouse: Anna Moore (m. 2005)
- Parent(s): Michael Buerk; Christine Lilley

Roland Buerk (born 1973) is an English former journalist who worked for the BBC. He was the Tokyo Correspondent for BBC News and covered the 2011 Tōhoku earthquake and tsunami. He left the BBC in mid-2012, to work for Nissan in the United Arab Emirates. He is the son of former BBC newsreader presenter Michael Buerk.

== Education ==
Buerk was educated at the Royal Grammar School, a day independent school for boys in his former hometown of Guildford in Surrey, followed by the University of Birmingham, from which he graduated with a degree in Political Science in 1995. He was the editor of the University's student newspaper, Redbrick, for the 1994–95 academic year.

== Life and career ==
After graduation, Buerk joined Independent Television News (ITN) in London as a graduate news trainee, and was assigned to Channel 5 News as a producer after he completed an eighteen-month course. After leaving ITN, Buerk became a freelance correspondent in Bangladesh and filed news reports for the BBC. He survived the 2004 Asian tsunami and reported on the effects of the tsunami on BBC News.

In January 2009, Buerk was appointed as the Tokyo Correspondent and reported on the 2011 Tōhoku earthquake and tsunami and reported from inside the Fukushima Daiichi Nuclear Power Plant.

In 2012, Buerk left the BBC to work for the Japanese motor manufacturer Nissan, in the United Arab Emirates.

== Personal life ==
Buerk is a twin to his brother Simon. In 2005, he married Dr Anna Moore, whom he met at university. Moore is credited with saving Buerk's life during the 2004 Asian tsunami, by waking him in their hotel bedroom in the coastal town of Unawatuna in Sri Lanka, moments before a large wave burst into the ground floor room they had just left. They were swept away on a tsunami wave with household debris and survived by clinging to a tree and later to a pillar on higher ground, until water levels subsided.

== Publications ==
- Breaking Ships (2006)
