= Ian Fergusson =

British meteorologist and marine biologist

Ian Kenneth Fergusson is a BBC Weather Presenter, Fellow of the Royal Meteorological Society and a Chartered Biologist specialising in sharks, especially species inhabiting the Mediterranean Sea.

Fergusson works for the BBC (British Broadcasting Corporation) presenting TV weather on regional TV news programme BBC Points West, BBC Local Radio and forecasting for BBC's Formula One multimedia coverage. He maintains a dedicated Twitter feed throughout each F1 race weekend, providing circuit-specific forecasts (@fergieweather). He was presenter for two BBC ONE documentaries – "Wild Weather" – in 2011 and 2013. In 2013, he was elected as a Fellow of the Royal Meteorological Society (FRMetS).

He has authored or co-authored a number of papers in marine biological science journals since 1993. Much of his research has focussed on biology of the great white shark in Mediterranean and north-eastern Atlantic waters.

A dedicated marine conservationist, Fergusson was a founding trustee, inaugural chairman and now a patron of the Shark Trust, a wildlife charity formed in 1997 and based in Plymouth, UK. Since 1994, he has served as a member of the IUCN (World Conservation Union) Shark Specialist Group, assisting with preparation of Red List status accounts. He is professionally qualified as a Chartered Biologist (CBiol) and member (MRSB) of the Royal Society of Biology.

He has worked on and appeared in various TV documentaries about sharks since the early 1990s and is credited as scientific advisor for the Emmy-awarded 1995 production Great White Shark: A Wildlife Special, co-produced by the BBC with National Geographic.

In 2007 Fergusson won a Craft Award for camerawork from the Royal Television Society in Bristol.
