= Sean Fletcher =

British television presenter (born 1974)

- Born: 20 April 1974 (age 52); New York, New York, U.S.
- Education: Felsted School; King’s College London (BA); Cardiff University (PgDip)
- Occupations: Journalist, presenter, newsreader
- Employer(s): BBC (2005–present); ITV (2014–2022); S4C (2021)
- Notable credit(s): Good Morning Britain (2014–2022); Countryfile (2015–present)
- Spouse: Luned Tonderai (m. 1999)
- Children: 2

Sean Fletcher (born 20 April 1974) is an American-English journalist, and television presenter best known as a presenter on Good Morning Britain and on Countryfile.

Fletcher has also presented the ITV daytime game show Rebound (2015–2016) and the BBC Sunday morning talk show Sunday Morning Live (2017–present).

== Early life and education ==
Born in New York City to a Zimbabwean-born mother and English father, he was brought up in Essex.

Fletcher was educated at Felsted School, an independent school in the village of Felsted (near Great Dunmow) in Essex, followed by King's College London, where he obtained a degree in Geography.

== Career ==
After training as a music producer, Fletcher began his journalism career in Cardiff, producing packages for BBC Radio Wales. He then moved to London to work behind the scenes at BBC Radio 5 Live. Several years later he began working on BBC 2W, the digital TV channel for Wales. He also presented and reported on sport for BBC Wales Today.

From 2005 until 2011, Fletcher presented sports bulletins on the rolling news channel BBC News, and has also presented sport on the BBC Weekend News and BBC Breakfast on BBC One as well as BBC World News. In March 2010, Fletcher began reporting on news stories for BBC Breakfast.

In October 2011, Fletcher left the BBC to join Sky Sports News, where he worked until his departure in early 2014.

On 3 March 2014, it was announced Fletcher would become a sports newsreader on the new ITV Breakfast programme Good Morning Britain. He first appeared on the programme on its opening day, 28 April 2014. He is now a regular news presenter on the programme.

In 2015, Fletcher presented Rebound, a ten-part daytime game show for ITV, airing in the 5 pm slot. A second series of the show was produced and aired in 2016. In September 2015, he appeared in an episode of All Star Mr & Mrs alongside his wife Luned.

Since October 2015, Fletcher has been an occasional reporter for Countryfile on BBC One.

Fletcher co-presented the BBC Two series Food Detectives alongside Tom Kerridge and Alice Roberts in 2016. Since 2017, he has presented the Sunday morning BBC One programme Sunday Morning Live initially alongside Emma Barnett. He has also been an occasional co-presenter of the BBC One Sunday programme Songs of Praise.

In September 2017, Fletcher replaced Matthew Wright as presenter of BBC's current affairs programme Inside Out London. In October 2017, he co-presented Britain's Classroom Heroes with Naga Munchetty on BBC Two.

== Personal life ==
Fletcher speaks Welsh fluently, and he married Luned Tonderai, a Welsh television producer and director, on 30 March 1999. The couple have a daughter and son. Fletcher lives in Acton, London. He is a Christian, and supports Tottenham Hotspur F.C.

=== Charity ===
In September 2015, Sean became an ambassador for the Beating Bowel Cancer charity. He ran the 2015 and 2016 London Marathon to raise money for the charity. In 2017, Fletcher ran the London Marathon for mental health charities Heads Together and Young Minds UK. In 2018 he ran his fourth London Marathon for Young Minds UK, for whom he is an ambassador. He is a trustee of Orchard, a charity that funds research into new treatments for Obsessive Compulsive Disorder (OCD), and he regularly hosts webinars with leading figures in OCD treatment.

In 2016, he played for the 'Rest of the World' team on ITV's celebrity football match Soccer Aid, which supports UNICEF UK.

== Filmography ==
Year	Title	Role	Notes
2005–2011	BBC News	Sport presenter/correspondent	
2008–2010	BBC Breakfast	Sport correspondent	
2011–2014	Sky Sports News	Reporter	
2014–present	Good Morning Britain	Newsreader/relief presenter	
2015–2016	Rebound	Presenter	2 series
2015–present	Countryfile	Presenter	
2016	Food Detectives	Co-presenter	1 series
2017–present	Sunday Morning Live	Co-presenter	
2017–present	Songs of Praise	Presenter	
2017–present	Inside Out London	Presenter	
2017–present	Britain's Classroom Heroes	Co-presenter	Annually
2017	Lord Mayor's Show	Co-presenter	
2021	Terfysg yn y Bae	Presenter	S4C series
2022	Wonders of the Border	Presenter	ITV series
2022	Britain's Secret War Babies	Presenter	Channel 4 documentary
2026	Sky News	Newsreader	One-off
