= Holding Back the Years (TV series) =

- Genre: Reality television
- Presented by: Fiona Phillips, Bill Turnbull, Rangan Chatterjee
- Country of origin: United Kingdom
- Original language: English
- No. of seasons: 2

Production
- Producer: Brian Stanley
- Running time: 45 minutes

Original release
- Network: BBC One
- Release: 2017 – 2018

Holding Back the Years is 2017 BBC One reality television series presented by Fiona Phillips, Bill Turnbull and Rangan Chatterjee.

The series ran for two seasons and three series from its debut in 2017 until its ending in 2018.

Celebrity guest presenters included Angela Rippon, Arlene Phillips, and Ainsley Harriott.

== Overview ==
Celebrities travel the United Kingdom to investigate retirement, what it means to be older, and life as a pensioner in 21st century Britain.

== Media reception ==
The i Paper wrote, "But in new BBC programme Holding Back the Years, Harriott and four other soon-to-be sexagenarians quiz people who have already passed the milestone, about the key to being happy in later life."
