= Fiona Lamdin =

English journalist

Fiona Lamdin (born 1975–76) is an English journalist and presenter based at BBC Points West in Bristol whose social affairs stories are broadcast across the UK by BBC News.

== Career ==
Lamdin's first role as a journalist was in Ecuador working for a radio station during which she interviewed former US President Jimmy Carter. She started at BBC Radio Bristol in 2000 and also worked on BBC Radio's Woman's Hour. She now works as a reporter and presenter for BBC Points West. and regularly delivers stories from across the southern half of England, and beyond, as a Social Affairs Correspondent for nationwide BBC News.

In 2009, when thirty weeks pregnant with her second child, she presented a TV feature on political parties' campaigning for parents' votes. She has a daughter.

In 2015, she won the EDF Energy award for Television News Journalist of the Year.

In 2016, she won Best Reporter at the Royal Television Society West of England awards, as well as being part of the BBC Points West team that won Best News Coverage for its reporting on the Becky Watts murder trial.

In July 2020, Lamdin became embroiled in controversy as she used the ethnic slur "nigger" in quoted speech in her report of a racist hit-and-run attack on a black National Health Service worker. BBC Radio 1Xtra DJ Sideman later resigned from the BBC due to this.
