= Katherine Downes =

English television presenter

Katherine Downes is an English television presenter who formerly worked on the BBC News Channel and BBC Breakfast, specialising in sports coverage.

== Biography ==
In 2009, Downes was working at BBC South East for which she won Best Newcomer at the Royal Television Society Southern Centre Awards in 2010.

Downes joined the BBC Sport team in 2012 when it moved to Salford. She had previously worked as a reporter and occasional presenter on BBC South East Today, as well as reporting on a variety of news stories as a correspondent for BBC Breakfast and the BBC News Channel during 2011.

On 1 June 2013, she married Tim Sleap at All Hallows Church in Sutton-on-the-Forest near York. She had allowed readers of Brides magazine to choose her wedding dress from a selection of five.

In November 2021, Downes announced she was leaving the BBC after 14 years with the corporation.

In 2022, Downes was part of BBC Sport's presentation and interview team at the 2022 Commonwealth Games in Birmingham.
