= Sian Williams =

Welsh journalist and television presenter

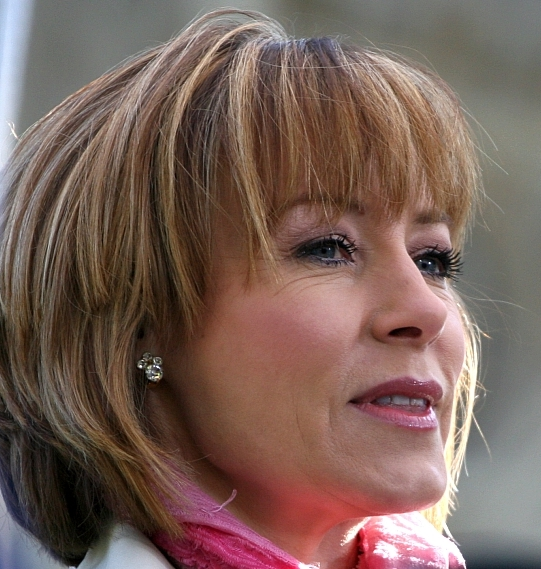
- Williams in 2010
- Born: Sian Mary Williams; 28 November 1964 (age 61); Paddington, London, England
- Education: City, University of London (DPsych); University of Westminster (MSc); Oxford Brookes University (BA)
- Occupations: Journalist, presenter, Psychologist
- Employer(s): Channel 5 (2016–2022); BBC (1985–2015, 2022–present)
- Notable credit(s): BBC Breakfast; BBC News; Your Money Their Tricks; Sunday Morning Live; 5 News at 5 Save Money: Good Health; Supermarket Secrets Revealed
- Spouse(s): Neale Hunt (m. 1991–2006) Paul Woolwich (m. 2006)
- Children: 4
- Website: sianwilliamsmedia.co.uk

Sian Mary Williams ([ˈʃɑn]; born 28 November 1964) is a British journalist, current affairs presenter, and counselling psychologist.

From 2001 until 2012, Williams regularly presented weekday editions of BBC Breakfast as well as all main news bulletins on BBC One. She presented two series of BBC One's discussion programme Sunday Morning Live from 2014 until 2015.

From January 2016 until March 2022, she was the main presenter of 5 News at 5. In March 2022 ITN announced Williams was to leave her daily presenting role. Williams said in the announcement she planned to continue with some broadcasting projects, but also devote more time to "delivering psychological support".

== Early life ==
Williams was born in Paddington, London, to Welsh parents and was brought up in Eastbourne, East Sussex. Her mother, Katherine Rees, was from Llanelli and had moved to London training to be a nurse at St Mary's Hospital, where Williams was born. Williams' father was from Swansea, and his family had been farmers in Glamorgan. He was a journalist, working first in print and later in radio. Williams has two younger twin brothers.

She gained a BA degree in English and history from Oxford Polytechnic (now Oxford Brookes University), and studied critical journalistic writing at the University of Rhode Island. In 2012, Williams began training in psychology, gaining an MSc degree from the University of Westminster, and was awarded a doctorate in Counselling Psychology in 2021 from City, University of London after working in the National Health Service and elsewhere.

== Career ==
Williams joined the BBC in 1985 and began working as a reporter and producer for BBC Local Radio stations in Liverpool, Sheffield, Leeds and Manchester. From 1990 to 1997, she was editor for BBC Radio 4's The World at One and PM programmes. Williams was also a programme editor for a number of news and election specials across Radio 4 and BBC Radio 5 Live.

Prior to the channel's launch in 1997, Williams joined BBC News 24 as an output editor. During screen tests for potential presenters, one applicant became unwell and Williams was asked to step into the role. Producers were impressed with her performance and they offered her the prime presenting slot of 4:00 pm to 7:00 pm alongside Gavin Esler. She remained with the channel for nearly two years before joining BBC One's Six O'Clock News in 1999 as Special Correspondent. She became a relief presenter of the bulletin and in 2001 she became its main Friday presenter during Fiona Bruce's maternity leave. Williams also became a main presenter of the BBC One weekend news bulletins.

Williams joined BBC Breakfast on 12 January 2001 as a relief presenter, initially presenting on Friday–Sunday alongside Darren Jordon, to cover for main presenter, Sarah Montague, and then later with Jeremy Bowen, to cover for Sophie Raworth. She also regularly deputised on both the Six O'Clock News and the One O'Clock News during this period. In 2004, Williams covered for Raworth on the Six O'Clock News during her maternity leave, co-presenting with George Alagiah, and the following year, reported from Sri Lanka and Thailand on the 2004 Indian Ocean earthquake and from Pakistan on the Kashmir earthquake.

In May 2005 she was confirmed as the main female presenter of BBC Breakfast, presenting initially with Dermot Murnaghan and then Bill Turnbull from 2008. Williams left BBC Breakfast on 15 March 2012 after the programme's production team was relocated to Salford. In 2012 she rejoined BBC Radio 4 to co-present Saturday Live.

Williams has presented programmes outside of news and current affairs including The One Show, Big Welsh Challenge, Now You're Talking and City Hospital. In 2010, Williams was a reporter for Watchdog. In 2013, she hosted Your Money, Their Tricks with Nicky Campbell and Rebecca Wilcox. Williams also presented a three-part interview series for BBC One Wales titled The Sian Williams Interview featuring Tanni Grey-Thompson, Suzanne Packer and Siân Phillips.

In June 2014, Williams became the new presenter of Sunday Morning Live, BBC One's religious and ethical debating programme. She presented the programme for two series before stepping down and being replaced by Naga Munchetty in June 2016.

On 5 November 2015, Williams announced she would be leaving the BBC to become the new main presenter of 5 News. She presented her first 5 News bulletin on 4 January 2016. From 2017 to 2021 she co-presented Save Money: Good Health alongside Ranj Singh on ITV. and Secrets of your Supermarket Food on C5.

Since 2021 Williams has presented a dedicated weekly mental health slot on 5 News called "Mind Matters with Dr Sian", bringing positive awareness to issues like autism, ADHD, anxiety and depression. In March 2022 ITN announced Williams was to leave her daily presenting role at 5 News but would continue to front "Mind Matters". Williams said in the announcement she planned to continue with some broadcasting projects, but also devote more time to "delivering psychological support".

In 2022 it was announced that she would be the new presenter of BBC Radio 4's Life Changing programme, which began in October.

In November 2023, Williams participated in Series 7, Week 8 of Richard Osman's House of Games.

Williams is a registered counselling psychologist with the Health and Care Professions Council.

== Other work ==
Williams was president of TRIC (Television and Radio Industries Club) for 2008–09 and won the title of Best Presenter in 2012 and 2013. She became an Honorary Fellow of the University of Cardiff in July 2012. and was awarded the title of Doctor of Arts of Oxford Brookes University in 2017 in recognition of her outstanding contribution to the pursuit of academic excellence.

In 2016 Williams' book Rise: Surviving and Thriving after Trauma, dealing with adversity, was published by Weidenfeld & Nicolson.

== Personal life ==
In February 1991 Williams married Neale Hunt, a former director of advertising firm McCann Erickson, with whom she has two sons. Following the couple's divorce, Williams married Paul Woolwich in 2006, with whom she has a son, a daughter and a stepdaughter. Williams lives in Goudhurst, Kent, having moved there from Muswell Hill, north London after she was diagnosed with breast cancer.

Williams ran the 2001 New York City Marathon and spent several days recovering in hospital from hyponatraemia. After several years not participating in running, she completed the Virgin London Marathon in 2013 and 2018.

During filming for the BBC's Coming Home in November 2010, Williams discovered she was the first member of her family to have been born outside Wales in 350 years of her known family tree.

=== Health ===
In May 2016, Williams said that she had undergone a double mastectomy, after being diagnosed with breast cancer. She told Woman & Home magazine that she had been diagnosed in 2014, a week after her 50th birthday. She said she had always thought she was healthy as she "did all the right things – I was a green tea drinker, a salmon eater, a runner". She said her main fear was of not being able to see her two youngest children grow up.

== Filmography ==
- City Hospital
- BBC Breakfast (2001–2012) – co-presenter
- Watchdog (2010) – reporter
- Crimewatch (2012, 2015) – stand-in presenter
- Your Money Their Tricks (2013) – co-presenter
- The Sian Williams Interview – presenter
- Sunday Morning Live (2014–2015) – presenter
- 5 News (2016–2022) – anchor
- Save Money: Lose Weight (2017) – co-presenter
- Save Money: Good Health (2017–present) – co-presenter
- Secrets of Your Supermarket Food (2018–present) – presenter
- Richard Osman's House of Games (2023) – contestant

Media offices
Preceded by Emma Crosby	Main Presenter: 5 News; 2016–2022	Succeeded by Dan Walker
Preceded by Natasha Kaplinsky	Main Presenter: BBC Breakfast; 2005–2012	Succeeded by Susanna Reid
Preceded by Natasha Kaplinsky	Deputy Presenter: BBC News at Six; 2007–2008	Succeeded by Fiona Bruce
