= Think Tank (Australian game show) =

- Based on: Think Tank by: 12 Yard; BBC Scotland
- Presented by: Paul McDermott
- Country of origin: Australia
- Original language: English
- No. of series: 1
- No. of episodes: 75

Production
- Running time: 60 mins
- Production company: ITV Studios Australia

Original release
- Network: ABC
- Release: 5 February – 18 May 2018

Think Tank is an Australian television quiz show based on the British program of the same name. It premiered on the ABC on 5 February 2018 and is hosted by Paul McDermott.

== Think Tank panelists ==
The Think Tank is made up of people from across Australia with various backgrounds and occupations, and who share an interest in quizzing. There are thirteen people in the Think Tank, who make up a panel of eight in each show.

- Caroline Roff, runs a community newsletter in Koo Wee Rup, Victoria.
- Deborah Cooke, an editor.
- Gurm Sekhon, an intercultural consultant.
- Mik Quall, a stay-at-home dad.
- Emma Goodsir, an educational psychologist.
- Sam Wade, an educational travel company worker who takes high school students to developing countries.
- Jono McQuie, a journalism student.
- Bruce Whalley, self-proclaimed "happiest tram driver in Melbourne".
- Chira Fernando, works in retail.
- Michelle Cheng, a journalist.
- Mat Garrick, a mining electrician from Broken Hill. He appeared as a housemate in the 12th season of Big Brother.
- Craig Lawler, Australian bushranger expert.
- Rachel Ramsay, a high school humanities teacher.

== Gameplay ==
Before the show, the Think Tank answered quiz questions under strict conditions to determine which eight are in the tank that episode, because if a Think Tanker gets the final "Question: Impossible" correct they cannot be in the episode. Three contestants play against each other in five rounds. The phrase, "Shut the gate, kill the goat, dance like a pagan" (commonly shortened to "Shut the gate") is sometimes used, similar to the phrase "Lock it in", from rival game show Millionaire Hot Seat, when selecting an answer. Some contestants have accidentally said "Lock it in" by mistake, leading to joking ridicule from the host.

=== Full Tank ===
Each contestant gets asked three questions. When a question is asked, each answer given by the Think Tank is displayed, some being correct, some not, with at least one of the options being correct. Contestants must decide which of the options is the correct answer. 15 points are given for each correct answer, with 45 being the maximum total possible.

=== Pick a Thinker ===
Each contestant (one at a time) chooses a Think Tank panellist to ask them one of two questions the panellists have written themselves. Each contestant gets three questions and get no help from the Think Tankers. Contestants who answer a question correctly get 25 points.

=== Trust Me, I'm a Think Tanker ===
Two Think Tankers are asked the same question, and each give their answer, only one of which is correct, and explain why they chose their answer. They must try to persuade the contestants that their answer is correct, and contestants then choose option A or option B. Five questions are asked in the round. Contestants with the correct answer are given 50 points. The contestant with the lowest score at the end of the round is eliminated from the game. At the end of this round, the Think Tank no longer know the questions asked by the host.

=== Head to Head ===
The remaining two contestants are each asked questions which have not been seen by the Think Tank, in a best-of-five shootout. Contestants can either answer the question themselves, or can select a Think Tanker for assistance. Each contestant has three opportunities to ask a Think Tank panellist, and each panellist can only be chosen once. If a Think Tank panellist is chosen, the contestant has twenty seconds (represented by a burning fuse connected to the brain symbol on a screen behind the host) to answer the question before the brain explodes. A question not answered in time counts as a wrong answer. The contestant with the most correct answers continues to the final round. If the scores are tied after five questions, additional questions are asked until one contestant gets a question right, and the other wrong. During the tie-breaker, contestants cannot ask a Think Tank panellist, even if all three chances to ask them have not been used. The tie-breaker is usually a numerical question and the contestant with the nearest answer wins.

=== Question: Impossible ===
The remaining contestant is asked a question that none of the Think Tankers were able to answer correctly before the show. To help to steer the contestant away from incorrect answers, the incorrect answers given by the Think Tank before the show, are displayed. If the contestant answers the question correctly, they receive the Think Tank trophy.
