= Rebound (game show) =

British game show (2015–2016)

- Genre: Game show
- Presented by: Sean Fletcher
- Country of origin: United Kingdom
- Original language: English
- No. of series: 2
- No. of episodes: 30

Production
- Running time: 60 minutes (inc. adverts)
- Production company: Thames

Original release
- Network: ITV
- Release: 17 August 2015 – 11 November 2016

Rebound is a British game show that aired on ITV from 17 August 2015 to 11 November 2016 and is presented by Sean Fletcher.

== Gameplay ==
Six contestants compete in each episode to accumulate money and eliminate each other by answering questions. The timing device used in the game is the Rebound Bar, a stripe of light that moves from one end of the stage to the other.

=== Fast Cash ===
All six contestants stand at one end of the stage. The host reads a question as the bar moves away from them to the opposite end, and he gives four answer options once it starts coming back toward them. Contestants may only lock in their answers during the return trip, and the value of the question decreases steadily to zero. A correct answer credits the contestant with the value at the moment they locked it in.

In Series 1, three questions were played for a maximum of £1,000 each, and the contestants had 10 seconds to answer. For Series 2, five questions were played at £500 each, with an 8-second time limit.

=== Head to Head ===
The contestants face each other in three one-on-one matchups. For each matchup, the highest scorer who has not yet played chooses an opponent and one of two categories. The two stand at opposite ends of the stage, and the bar starts to approach one of them from the halfway point as the host reads a question. A correct answer reverses its direction and increases its speed; however, the contestant in control may answer only after the bar has crossed into their half of the stage. Each contestant is given three lives. If the bar reaches a contestant, they lose one life and the opponent chooses the next category. Losing all three lives eliminates a contestant and forfeits all their money to the opponent.

In case of a nonzero tie between contestants, priority is given to the one who earned the most money from the first Fast Cash question. For a tie at zero, the one who locked in their first incorrect answer faster has priority.

=== Second Fast Cash ===
The three remaining contestants play five more Fast Cash questions for up to £1,000 each. The time limit was 10 seconds in Series 1, and 7 seconds in Series 2.

=== Stop the Bar ===
The contestants, standing at one end of the stage, each have their own bar. The high scorer's bar is placed at the opposite end, while those of the other contestants are placed closer: three seconds for the middle scorer, six seconds for the low scorer (reduced respectively to two and four seconds in Season 2). The host reads three answer choices, then reveals a question as the bars start to move toward the contestants. Locking in an answer stops that contestant's bar; if it is incorrect, the bar moves three seconds closer. A contestant is eliminated with no winnings as soon as their bar reaches them, and the last one standing advances to the final to play for the total accumulated by all three.

=== Final: Beat the Bar ===
A 15-step path is laid out across the stage, with the contestant at one end and the bar initially positioned at the other. The contestant chooses one category from a list of six, and the bar starts to approach slowly as the host asks questions. Each correct answer allows the contestant to move ahead one step; after every fifth such answer, the bar stops and they must choose a new category. Once the bar reaches the starting end of the path, it rebounds and begins to approach the contestant from behind. The contestant wins the jackpot by completing the path without being overtaken by the bar, but if it catches up, the round ends and they leave with nothing.

The maximum possible jackpot was £33,000 in Series 1, and £30,000 in Series 2.

== Critical reception ==
Carrick Gazette commended Fletcher's hosting abilities and described it as "an enjoyable enough watch, but too much of the chat with the contestants was about why they gave the answers they did".

== Israeli version ==
An adaptation of Rebound debuted in Israel on 30 August 2018 under the title הקו האדום (meaning The Red Line). This version has several differences from the original British version; the most obvious being that there are only four contestants instead of six.

== Transmissions ==
Series	Start date	End date	Episodes
1	17 August 2015	28 August 2015	10
2	17 October 2016	11 November 2016	20
