= Think Tank (game show) =

2016 BBC quiz show

- Genre: Quiz show
- Presented by: Bill Turnbull
- Country of origin: United Kingdom
- Original language: English
- No. of series: 2
- No. of episodes: 50

Production
- Producer: Chris Greenwood
- Running time: 45 minutes
- Production companies: 12 Yard; BBC Scotland

Original release
- Network: BBC One
- Release: 21 March – 16 December 2016

Related
- Think Tank (Australia)

Think Tank is a BBC quiz show that aired on BBC One from 21 March to 16 December 2016 and was hosted by Bill Turnbull.

== Format ==
Three contestants took part in each episode, as did an eight-member panel known as the "Think Tank." The competition consisted of four rounds; the questions in the first three were chosen from hundreds that had been asked to the Think Tank beforehand, with all members answering individually. Correct answers in these three rounds were worth £200 each.

During the first round, the host asked a question to one contestant at a time, and the Think Tank's answers were revealed. At least one member had the correct answer. Each contestant received two turns.

In the second round, each member was assigned two questions that they had answered correctly. The contestant in control chose a member, who asked one of their questions. Each contestant received three turns; once a member had been chosen twice, they had to sit out the rest of the round.

The host asked three questions to all contestants in the third round. For each, two members were chosen to give their answers and explain their reasoning; however, only one of them was correct. The contestants then secretly chose an answer. At the end of this round, the lowest scorer was eliminated and forfeited all of their winnings. In the event of a tie for low score, the host asked a question with a numerical answer and the tied contestants secretly entered their guesses on keypads. The one who came closer to the actual answer (high or low) advanced.

For the fourth round, the host asked five pairs of questions that had not been put to the Think Tank, alternating between contestants; the one with the higher total decided who played first. After a contestant heard a question, they could discuss it with one member before answering. Each member could only be chosen once, so if the round progressed to the fifth pair of questions, the contestants had to answer without any help. The contestant who answered more questions correctly kept their winnings and advanced to the final. The round could end early if one contestant amassed an insurmountable lead. If the round ended in a tie, the host continued asking pairs of questions until one contestant answered correctly and the other missed.

The final ("Question: Impossible") consisted of a single question that had been missed by the entire Think Tank. The contestant was shown their incorrect responses, and could win an additional £1,000 by giving the correct answer.

The maximum potential winnings total was £2,600, obtained by answering every question correctly in the first three rounds and succeeding in the final.

In the first series, the members of the Think Tank were Lucy Barry, Max Bruges, Len Crumbie, Anisha Devadasan, Arminel Fennelly, Cleve Freckleton, Ken Fullicks, Tristan Harper, Diane Hill, Abi Kanthabalan, Jackie Waring and Peter Wong. The third episode of series 2 introduced two more regular contestants, Jordan Humphries and Mark Hogarth.

== Critical reception ==
Julia Raeside of The Guardian described Think Tank as "the perfect blend of Deal or No Deal? and Blankety Blank", and "a masterpiece of good judgment, and a likely candidate for the new student/homeworker/retired person's daytime obsession. Synchronise kettles and bring it on". Jane Rackham said in Radio Times: "Turnbull is a charming host while there's a great deal of good-natured teasing and laughter between the Think Tank members". Frances Taylor, writing for the television blog of the BT website, said the show was "very drawn out" and that "if it was shortened to half an hour and some of the rounds tweaked—and some of the waffle cut—it could be quite an innovative and engaging quiz show".

== Transmissions ==
Series	Episodes	Originally released	
Series	Episodes	First released	Last released
1	20	21 March 2016	15 April 2016
2	30	22 August 2016	16 December 2016

== Australian version ==
The Australian version of the show first aired on the ABC on 5 February 2018 and was hosted by Paul McDermott.
