= BBC Radio Bristol =

Coordinates: 51.4611°N 2.6080°W

- Bath and Bristol; England
- Broadcast area: Bath, Bristol, South Gloucestershire, North and North East Somerset
- Frequencies: FM: 94.9 MHz (Dundry); FM: 103.6 MHz (Hutton); FM: 104.6 MHz (Bath); DAB: 11B; Freeview: 711
- RDS: BBC BSTL

Programming
- Language: English
- Format: Local news, talk and music

Ownership
- Owner: BBC Local Radio, BBC West

History
- First air date: 4 September 1970
- Former frequencies: 1548 MW

Technical information
- Licensing authority: Ofcom

Links
- Website: BBC Radio Bristol

BBC Radio Bristol is the BBC's local radio station serving the cities of Bristol and Bath and the unitary authorities of Bath and North East Somerset, North Somerset and South Gloucestershire.

It broadcasts on FM, DAB, digital TV and via BBC Sounds from studios at Broadcasting House in Bristol.

According to RAJAR, the station has a weekly audience of 88,000 listeners as of May 2025.

== Technical ==
BBC Radio Bristol broadcasts on FM frequencies 94.9 MHz (Dundry), 104.6 MHz (Bath), 103.6 MHz (Weston-super-Mare), and on DAB.

The Mendip transmitter, near Wells, used to broadcast BBC Radio Bristol on 95.5 MHz over a very large area but, from 3 December 2007, this was transferred to the new BBC Somerset service. Since the BBC relaunched BBC Somerset on FM, BBC Radio Bristol has been left free to concentrate editorially on Bristol, Bath and the rest of the former Avon area.

On 11 December 2014, the station launched on Freeview channel 711, on the PSB 1 multiplex from the Mendip transmitter and its TV relays. The station also streams online via BBC Sounds.

The AM transmitter at Mangotsfield on 1548 kHz was closed in February 2016.

== Programming ==
Weekday programming is produced and broadcast from the BBC's Bristol studios from 6 am to 2 pm each day. The afternoon programme is shared with BBC Radio Somerset.

Weekday evening programmes are all shared across the BBC West region.

At weekends, all programmes except Saturday sport are either regional or national.

The late show, airing every day from 10 pm to 1 am, is a national programme originating in either Manchester or London.

BBC Radio Bristol simulcasts overnight programming from BBC Radio 5 Live between 1am and 6am.

== Presenters ==
=== Notable past presenters ===
Kate Adie and Michael Buerk produced and presented programmes for BBC Radio Bristol as part of the station's launch team in the 1970s. Buerk's voice was the first to be heard on the station.

Kenny Everett was a presenter during the early 1970s. He pre-recorded his shows from his farmhouse in Sussex.

Comedian Chris Morris worked for the station in the late 1980s, presenting and producing his own weekend show, No Known Cure. He was dismissed from the station after "talking over the news bulletins and making silly noises".

One of the station's longest serving presenters was veteran local journalist Roger Bennett, who joined at launch as a reporter, before going onto present its flagship breakfast programme, Morning West, from 1974 to 2003. He continued to freelance at Radio Bristol until his death in July 2005.

Other past presenters include Susan Osman, who also co-presented Points West for 14 years, and John Turner, who worked on the station between 1978 and 2007.

Jenni Murray, presenter of BBC Radio 4's Woman's Hour, started her BBC career at Radio Bristol, as well as Susanna Reid, a presenter on Good Morning Britain.

Doctor and comedian Dr Phil Hammond presented a Saturday morning show called Saturday Surgery for 12 years, but was taken off air in August 2018 after announcing his intention to stand for Parliament.

Former Breakfast Show host James Hanson is now a presenter for LBC and LBC News.

== Controversy ==
In November 2008, BBC Radio Bristol presenter Sam Mason was dismissed following an incident in which it was alleged that she had made racist remarks in an off-air phone conversation during a weekday afternoon show. Whilst phoning a taxi firm in order to send her 14-year-old daughter from Mason's Clifton home to her grandparents' home, she was said to have asked the company not to send an Asian driver.

== See also ==
- BBC Studios Natural History Unit, which is based in Broadcasting House, Bristol.
