= Charlie Stayt =

English television journalist

- Born: Charles Jeffaries Stayt; 19 June 1962 (age 64); Maisemore, Gloucestershire, England
- Education: Wycliffe College, Gloucestershire; Birmingham Polytechnic
- Occupations: Journalist; Television presenter
- Notable credit: BBC Breakfast
- Spouse: Anne Breckell (m. 1995)
- Children: 2

Charles Jeffaries Stayt (born 19 June 1962) is an English newsreader and broadcaster. He is a journalist with the BBC as a presenter for BBC Breakfast.

== Early life and education ==
Charles Jeffaries Stayt was born on 19 June 1962 in Maisemore, Gloucestershire. He has two older siblings. He was educated at The King's School, Gloucester, and at Wycliffe College, a co-educational part-boarding independent school in Stonehouse, Gloucestershire, before going to Birmingham Polytechnic.

His father John, attended The Crypt School and was much involved with the Scout movement, being first District Commissioner for Gloucester from the late 1950s, then County Commissioner from the mid-1960s to the 1980s.

== Career ==
Stayt started his career on a commercial radio station in his home town of Gloucester. Before moving into television, he worked on radio in London, hosting Capital Radio's news programme, The Way It Is and also reporting for LBC and BBC Radio 5 Live.

Stayt began his TV career working for ITN in 1995, then joined Five News as a reporter before presenting the network's prime-time bulletins and half-hour live debate programmes. He anchored Five News' coverage of the Millennium celebrations and the terrorism attacks of 11 September 2001 and spent a total of ten years at ITN, both as a correspondent and a presenter. He has also been a presenter for Sky News. He has hosted live "reality TV" shows Jailbreak and Are You Telepathic.

Stayt joined BBC Breakfast in April 2006, initially as a relief presenter, but in December 2007, he was confirmed as its Friday–Sunday presenter. Since January 2008, he has been the weekend presenter for BBC Breakfast, the early morning news programme broadcast on BBC One and BBC News. He moved with the programme to Salford and presents the programme Thursday–Saturday with Naga Munchetty.

In addition to Thursday–Saturday duties, Stayt also stood in on occasion for main Monday–Wednesday presenter Bill Turnbull and subsequently Dan Walker, but this arrangement ceased when Jon Kay replaced Walker as main Monday–Wednesday presenter in May 2022.

In August 2016, Stayt appeared in Dictionary Corner on Channel 4's Countdown for a number of episodes.

In 2022, Stayt appeared in BBC One's The Weakest Link.

== Personal life ==
Stayt married Anne Breckell in 1995. They live in St Margarets, west London, and have a daughter (born 1997) and a son (born 2000). His wife was a ballet dancer with The Royal Ballet. His wife's father, aged 57, had a mysterious fatal accident at 7pm on 5 December 1992, between Highnam and Over, Tewkesbury in his Reliant Scimitar, and died of head injuries in the Gloucestershire Royal Hospital the following morning.

Stayt is related to the Tewkesbury author John Moore (1907–1967).

Media offices
Preceded by Bill Turnbull	Weekend Presenter of BBC Breakfast; 2008–present	Succeeded by Incumbent
