= Susan Osman =

British journalist

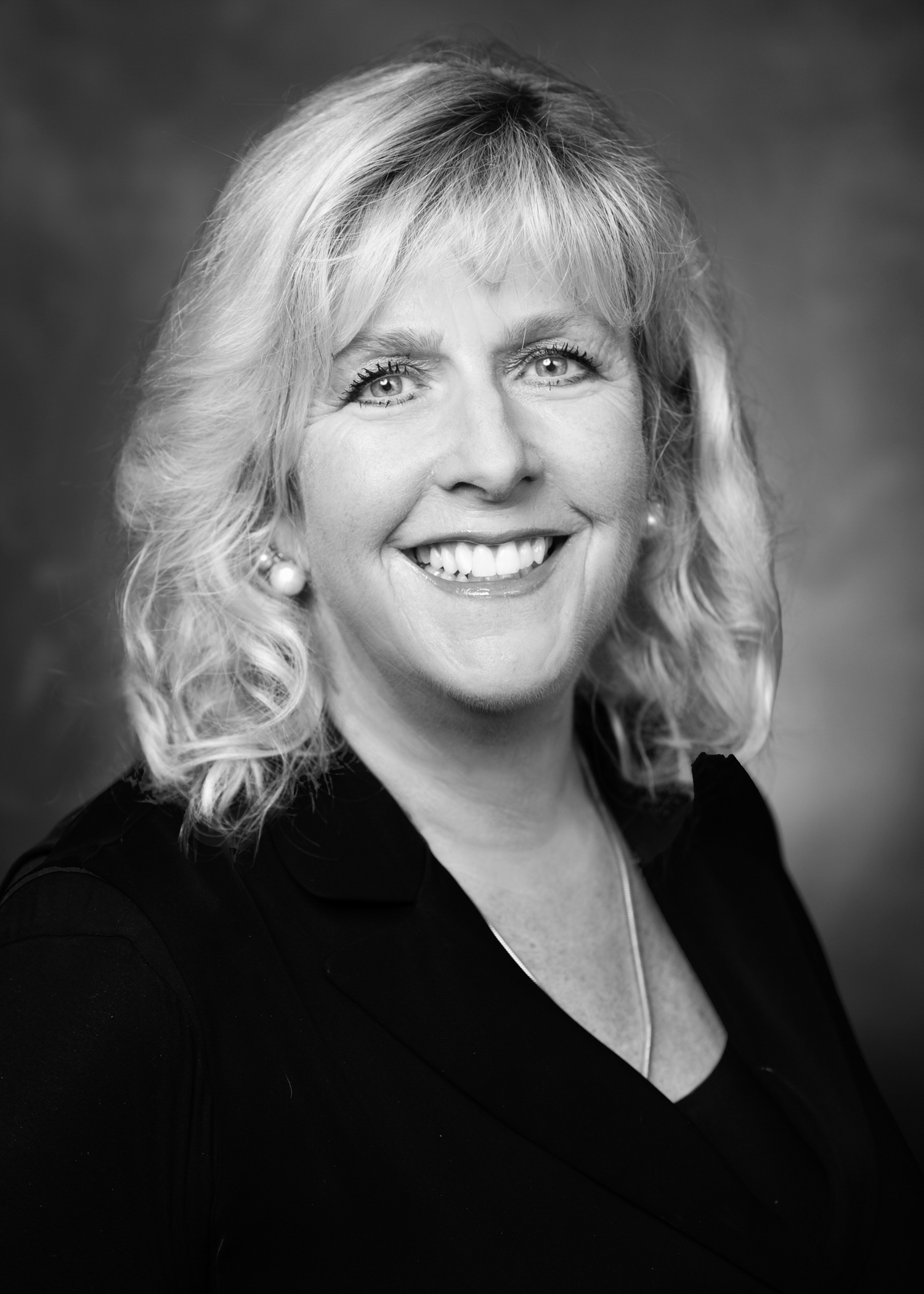
Susan Osman in 2019

Susan Osman is a British journalist known for her work with BBC, ITV and China Radio International.

Osman was a theatre director in Brighton, and also worked in that capacity in Washington, DC. She began her television career in 1983 at HTV West. She also worked as an investigative reporter for Channel 4's consumer affairs programme 4 What It's Worth, as well as at BBC East.

She first joined BBC West in 1991. She presented the current affairs programme Close Up West, and also hosted her own radio programme, Radio Bristol's Morning Show. She also hosted the program Points West until leaving that position in 2005. She continued doing freelance work for the network until 2009.

Osman left her position at the BBC in December 2009, citing rampant age-discrimination against women in broadcasting. She stated that women in broadcasting have a "sell-by date", and that every time she mentions her age, she worries about ending her career. She stated that she even had a manager ask if she was menopausal. Because of this, Osman felt she had no future in the United Kingdom. The BBC denied the allegations of ageism.

Osman accepted a job at China Radio International in 2009, largely to allow herself to continue advancing in her career. She praised Chinese culture's respect for older persons and took a position as the host of the English-language talk show The Beijing Hour. She has faced some difficulties from the Chinese government's insistence on censorship. The private lives of leaders, the Tiananmen Square protests and Falun Gong are off-limits to her show, as well as a variety of smaller issues that are censored at times.

Osman has set up film companies called Nick O’Time Films, and Osman Films, along with her writing partner Rowena Goldman. She is also working on a book that will be called Flirting with the Dragon – Why We Misunderstand China.

== Podcasting ==
Osman co-hosts the podcast Well, That’s Awkward alongside Wellbeing Magazine founder Rachel Branson. The show features candid and often humorous discussions on midlife, health, relationships and wellbeing, and is recorded in a conversational, unscripted format. The podcast explores topics that are often considered taboo or under-discussed, particularly among women over 40.

In 2026, Osman and Branson also launched First of Many, a podcast focused on uncovering the stories of women who were pioneers in fields such as science, medicine, education and the arts, but whose contributions have often been overlooked or uncredited. The series examines historical narratives and highlights the achievements of women whose work helped shape modern society.
