= Jon Kay =

English TV presenter and journalist

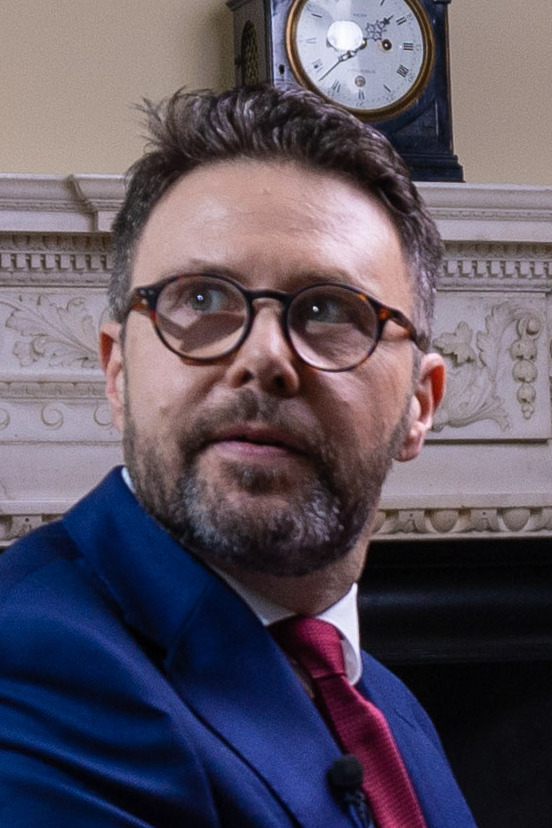
- Kay in 2023
- Born: Jonathan Francis Kay; 8 November 1969 (age 56); Kingston upon Hull, East Riding of Yorkshire, England
- Education: Exeter University
- Occupations: Television presenter, journalist
- Years active: 1992–present
- Employer: BBC
- Spouse: Francesca Kasteliz (m. 1998)
- Children: 3

Jonathan Francis Kay (born 8 November 1969) is an English TV presenter, newsreader and journalist based in the West of England. He is known for his work on BBC News.

== Early life ==
Kay was born on 8 November 1969 and grew up in Nantwich, Cheshire, with his three brothers, attending Abbey Gate College, an independent school in Chester. He was head boy, gaining three As and a B in General Studies. He took a year out, known as a 'gap year'.

From the age of 18 he studied at the University of Exeter in Devon. During his studies there, he spent time in the studios of University Radio Exeter, which led to his decision to pursue a career in broadcast journalism. After graduation with a BA degree in Politics in 1992, he joined the BBC as a trainee local reporter.

== Journalism career ==
After periods at BBC local radio stations, Kay became a full-time reporter for BBC Radio Bristol, making an early documentary on the development of Bradley Stoke.

Kay worked as a regional reporter for BBC Points West and then moved to the capital as a national news correspondent for BBC London News. He then became a news correspondent for BBC News covering the South-West of the country, but he regularly covers stories in other parts of Britain and around the world. In 2014, Kay reported from Portugal on the investigation into the disappearance of Madeleine McCann and from Cape Town on the trial of Shrien Dewani (later exonerated for his wife's murder). He was BBC News at Six correspondent during the London Olympics in 2012 and election correspondent during the 2015 general election campaign. Jon Kay is also a regular presenter on BBC Breakfast. In July 2022, it was announced by the BBC that Kay would become the main presenter of BBC Breakfast from Monday to Wednesday. In 2025, Kay was appointed as one of BBC News chief presenters, based in Salford, joining the ones based in London, Singapore and Washington.

== Personal life ==
Kay married fellow BBC trainee Francesca Kasteliz in 1998. They had met during their secondment to the newsroom at BBC Radio Bristol. They live in Bristol and have three children. Having worked as a BBC presenting coach, Kasteliz now works as a freelance television coach.

His brother Oliver Kay, is also a journalist, having worked as Chief Football Correspondent for The Times.
