= BBC Points West =

British TV regional news programme (since 1957)

- Title card used since April 2022
- Theme music composer: David Lowe
- Countries of origin: England, United Kingdom
- Original language: English

Production
- Producers: BBC News; BBC West
- Production locations: Broadcasting House, Bristol, England
- Camera setup: Multi-camera
- Running time: 30 minutes (main 6:30 pm programme)

Original release
- Network: BBC One West
- Release: September 1957 – present

BBC Points West is the BBC's regional TV news programme for the West of England, covering Bristol, Somerset, the majority of Gloucestershire and Wiltshire (excluding the city of Salisbury), and northern parts of Dorset.

The service is produced and broadcast from the Broadcasting House on Whiteladies Road in Bristol with district newsrooms based in Bath, Gloucester, Swindon and Taunton.

== History ==
BBC television news from Bristol began on 30 September 1957 with a five-minute bulletin on weekday nights, serving what would later become the BBC's South, West and South West regions of England. The first bulletin, which survives as a telerecording, was presented by actress Armine Sandford – the first woman to regularly present a BBC television news bulletin.

The launch of the BBC's regional TV bulletins came ahead of the rival ITV services provided by TWW, which began in January 1958, and Southern Television, which launched the following August.

Around this time, the West Region bulletins were obliged to share a ten-minute timeslot with news bulletins for Wales as the Wenvoe transmitter on the outskirts of Cardiff was serving viewers in both South Wales and the West Country. This arrangement continued even after separate bulletins for the South and South West regions were introduced in 1961. Thus, when the newly launched Points West was given a ten-minute slot on 17 September 1962, it shared its slot with Wales Today.

The launch of a dedicated BBC Wales television station in February 1964 finally allowed Points West to become a full-length regional news programme broadcast only to the West of England. This was more than seven years before a similar regional news service would be introduced by HTV West.

Between June 1991 and May 2000, the programme was known as BBC News West before reverting back to its original title on 22 May 2000.

== Coverage area ==
The programme covers much of the West of England, including Bristol, Somerset, the majority of Wiltshire and Gloucestershire, and parts of north Dorset.

Southeastern parts of Wiltshire, including Salisbury and Tidworth, are served by South Today broadcast from Southampton since television signals in those areas are received from the Rowridge and Hannington transmitters. Eastern parts of Swindon and some parts of eastern Gloucestershire such as Stow-on-the-Wold and Fairford cannot get signals from the Mendip transmitter on Freeview but instead receive the Oxford transmitter that also broadcasts South Today.

Freeview viewers in the north of Gloucestershire around Gloucester, Cheltenham and Tewkesbury receive better signals from the Ridge Hill transmitter which broadcasts Midlands Today from Birmingham. However, those areas receive Points West on Channel 101 through satellite providers such as Freesat, based on the towns' postcodes.

Western parts of Somerset and the Taunton Deane area receive better television signals from the Stockland Hill transmitter that broadcasts Spotlight from Plymouth on Freeview.

== Notable presenters and reporters ==
- David Garmston
- Ian Fergusson
- Fiona Lamdin
- Dan Johnson (network correspondent for BBC News)

== Former presenters and reporters ==
- Jon Kay
- Jeremy Carrad
- Chris Vacher
- Alex Lovell
- Susan Osman
- Gerald Hine-Haycock (as Gerald Haycock)
- Michael Buerk
- Armine Sandford
- Vivien Creegor
- Sue Carpenter
- Clive Myrie
- Saima Mohsin
- Richard Angwin (weather)
- Gwyn Richards
- John Norman
- Graham Purches
- Peter Brown
- Andrew Harvey (journalist)
- John Craven
- Mark Puckle
- Hugh Sykes (journalist)

== See also ==
- BBC News
