= Rob Bonnet =

English sports journalist (born 1952)

- Born: Robert Bonnet; 27 September 1952 (age 73); London, England
- Education: Dulwich College
- Alma mater: University of Sussex
- Occupation: Sports Journalist
- Years active: 1977–2024
- Spouse: Margaret Harvey (m. 1980)
- Children: 2

Robert Bonnet (born 27 September 1952) is a British sports journalist on the BBC. He has presented bulletins across the BBC News Channel and BBC World News and presents Extratime, an interview programme on BBC World and BBC News. Bonnet was for seventeen years one of the main sports presenters on BBC Radio 4's flagship breakfast programme Today.

== Early life ==
Born in London, Bonnet was educated at Dulwich College, a boys' independent school in Dulwich, London. He later attended the University of Sussex and read English and French. Before joining the BBC, Bonnet had worked as a dustman, a disc-jockey, and also had a job in advertising with the Benton & Bowles agency.

== Broadcasting career ==
Bonnet started his career at BBC Radio Brighton as a freelance assistant in 1977 and joined the BBC staff in the summer of 1980 as a producer on Radio Norfolk. He would later be attached to the Radio 1 news programme Newsbeat. He started broadcasting at BBC Sport's radio department in the autumn of 1982 and BBC East in 1985. Bonnet started his national television career by joining the BBC News team in February 1987 and had been employed as a sports reporter and correspondent. Bonnet's report on Sydney winning the 2000 Olympic Games on a 9 O'Clock news bulletin won him the RTS Sports Report of the year in 1993. In September 1995, Bonnet joined the BBC Breakfast team as their sports reporter until stepping down the role in October 2005.

He has also covered major events such as the FIFA World Cup, the Commonwealth Games and the Olympic Games along other high-profile sporting events.

During an interview with Paralympic athlete Oscar Pistorius on 6 September 2011, Bonnet asked about the ethical issues associated with his participation in the 4x400 relay during the World Championships in Daegu with Pistorius replying "I think that's an insult to me and I think this interview is over" and then left the studio afterwards.

Bonnet is also a director of the internet TV service The Country Channel and he remains a broadcaster with BBC World's Extra Time sports interview programme as well as BBC Radio 4’s Today programme and has also guest starred for BBC Radio 5 Live and television programmes such as Sportsweek, Sportsnight and Chiles on Sunday.

Rob announced in May 2024 that he would retire at the end of this year, having been with the organization since 1977. Rob presented sports bulletins on the BBC's Radio 4 Today programne from 2007 until his last sports report after the 2024 Summer Olympics on 12 Aug 2024.

== Personal life ==
He has two daughters with his wife Margaret Harvey whom he married in 1980. Bonnet runs Five Iron Productions, which specialises in on-site recording, editing and presentation of corporate golf and charity events.
