= Bill Turnbull =

British journalist and presenter (1956–2022)

- Born: William Robert Jolyon Turnbull; 25 January 1956; Guildford, Surrey, England
- Died: 31 August 2022 (aged 66); Theberton, Suffolk, England
- Education: University of Edinburgh; Cardiff University
- Occupations: Television and radio presenter; journalist
- Years active: 1978–2022
- Employers: BBC; Classic FM
- Notable credits: Breakfast (2001–2016); Songs of Praise (2013–2022); Think Tank (2016)
- Spouse: Sarah McCombie (m. 1988)
- Children: 3

William Robert Jolyon Turnbull (25 January 1956 – 31 August 2022) was a British television and radio presenter and journalist whose broadcasting career spanned over 4 decades. He began his career working for some radio stations including Radio Clyde and BBC Radio 4's Today. He presented BBC News 24 and BBC Radio 5 Live before taking on his most notable role as one of the main presenters of BBC Breakfast, a position he held for 15 years between 2001 and 2016. Later in his career, he presented the religious series Songs of Praise and game show Think Tank, as well as being a presenter on the radio station Classic FM.

== Early life ==
Turnbull was born in Guildford, Surrey, on 25 January 1956, the youngest of four siblings to William, a barrister of Scottish ancestry who worked in the City of London and Honor (née Wicks), a teacher. He was educated at Eton College and the University of Edinburgh, where he edited the student newspaper. He graduated from Cardiff University in 1978.

== Career ==
Turnbull's career began at Scottish local station Radio Clyde in 1978; he later freelanced for a number of years in the US. Turnbull joined the BBC as a reporter for the Today programme in 1986 and Breakfast Time as a reporter in 1988, before becoming a correspondent for BBC News in 1990. He covered a wide range of domestic and international stories, reporting from more than 30 countries, including a four-year stint as Washington Correspondent, based in the US. His producer for a while was Sian Williams. In this role, he reported on a number of major American stories, including the O. J. Simpson murder trial and the Monica Lewinsky scandal that rocked Bill Clinton's presidency. In 1997, Turnbull moved back to the UK and became one of the main presenters on BBC News 24, appearing alongside Valerie Sanderson. He also presented regular programmes on Radio 5 Live, including a stint as a presenter on Weekend Breakfast.

Turnbull joined the BBC Breakfast team in 2001 as a weekend presenter, presenting with Sian Williams initially and then later with Sarah Montague, Mishal Husain and Susanna Reid. He also regularly appeared as a relief presenter on the weekday programme, with Sophie Raworth, Natasha Kaplinsky, Kate Silverton and Louise Minchin. He became the main weekday presenter of Breakfast in 2008, rejoining Williams and replacing Dermot Murnaghan. Turnbull was also an occasional relief presenter of News at Six and News at One.

As well as anchoring programmes in the studio, Turnbull regularly presented on location. In the aftermath of Hurricane Katrina, he was sent to New Orleans to report for BBC News, presenting both Breakfast and the News at Six live from Biloxi and Gulfport, Mississippi. In the aftermath of the 7 July 2005 London bombings, Turnbull anchored Breakfast's coverage live from King's Cross railway station. He fronted the programme's coverage of the 2008 US presidential election live from Washington, D.C. and New York, and was in Washington once again for the 2012 US presidential election. In 2005, he was a contestant in the third series of Strictly Come Dancing, partnered with Karen Hardy. In spite of a serious ankle injury in the second week (which then flared up at various points in the series), he stayed in the competition for seven weeks, finishing sixth out of twelve contestants.

In April and May 2010, Turnbull travelled around the UK presenting and reporting for Breakfast on the general election campaign trail. In June 2010 he presented Breakfast live from Whitehaven in the aftermath of the Cumbria shootings. He joined the presenting team of the BBC's Songs of Praise in 2013.

In 2015, he began narrating the CBBC sketch comedy series Class Dismissed, also appearing in a cameo as himself in episode 12. It was announced on 2 September 2015 that Turnbull would be leaving Breakfast early the following year, after fifteen years. He presented his last episode, with Louise Minchin, on 26 February 2016.

In March 2016, he began presenting the daytime BBC One quiz show Think Tank. Beginning in April 2016, he presented his own radio show on Classic FM. The show aired from 10:00 am until 1:00 pm on Saturday and Sunday. In July 2016, Turnbull narrated another CBBC mockumentary comedy series based on Paignton Zoo called The Zoo, broadcast on CBBC in 2017.

Turnbull was guest presenter of three episodes of The One Show during 2016, alongside Alex Jones. In March 2018, just as his cancer diagnosis was made public, BBC One aired 10 episodes of Holding Back the Years, featuring Turnbull with Fiona Phillips offering information on living well in later life.

== Other TV appearances ==
In August 2006, Turnbull agreed to take part in a polyphasic sleep experiment presented on BBC One's The One Show. In this experiment, he slept for a total of three hours per day, in six 30-minute bursts, for ten consecutive days. The effect of this sleep pattern on his health was visible, as he presented Breakfast almost every weekday during the duration of the exercise and became increasingly sleep-deprived. In November 2006, he appeared alongside fellow BBC News presenters in a performance for Children in Need that Jan Moir, writing for The Telegraph, described as "charisma-free", adding that although Turnbull dressed up like James Bond, he looked like a "dodgy sommelier".

Turnbull also appeared in an episode of the game show School's Out broadcast on BBC One on 11 August 2007. In September 2007, he appeared on the celebrity version of Who Wants to Be a Millionaire? with his BBC Breakfast co-presenter Sian Williams to raise money for Marie Curie Cancer Care. On 28 October 2007, Turnbull made a guest appearance on the children's television show SMart. In January 2008, he appeared on Celebrity Mastermind. His specialist subject was beekeeping.

In 2009, he took part in the BBC series Around the World in 80 Days with Breakfast colleague Louise Minchin for Children in Need, travelling from Mongolia, through Russia and South Korea, before crossing the Pacific on a container ship and landing in California. In 2011, he also made an appearance on the BBC One game show Pointless Celebrities alongside Sian Williams, which they won. He also appeared alongside Lee Mack and Louie Spence on Would I Lie to You? and made a guest appearance as himself in "The Wedding of River Song", the sixth series finale of Doctor Who, with his then Breakfast co-presenter Sian Williams. In 2012, he appeared in Professor Green's music video for "Remedy". In 2013, he appeared in an episode of Room 101 and in 2016, he was a contestant in a celebrity episode of The Chase.

On 24, 25, and 26 February 2020, Turnbull presented Good Morning Britain with Susanna Reid. He later returned to the programme in May 2021. In October 2021, he was a contestant on Richard Osman's House of Games.

== Personal life and death ==
Turnbull married Sarah McCombie in March 1988 in the London Borough of Hackney. The couple had two sons (born September 1988 and October 1989), and a daughter (born August 1991). Turnbull and his wife previously lived in Jordans, Buckinghamshire but relocated to Rainow, Cheshire, in 2012, following the move of BBC Breakfast to Salford. Subsequently, he moved to Theberton, Suffolk.

Turnbull was a Christian and a member of the Church of England, and he would occasionally lead Evensong at his local church.

Turnbull was a fan of Wycombe Wanderers, for which he commentated on home games for online listeners. His hobbies included beekeeping, chickens and dancing. In addition, Turnbull enjoyed long-distance running, having competed in the London Marathon on a number of occasions, and the Great North Run on 5 October 2008. On 8 September 2009, Turnbull was awarded an honorary doctorate from Buckinghamshire New University in recognition of his charity work within the Buckinghamshire community.

In May 2010, he published The Bad Beekeepers Club, a comedy book about the ups and downs of beekeeping.

In March 2018, Turnbull revealed he had been diagnosed the previous November with prostate cancer. He died at his home in Suffolk on 31 August 2022, aged 66. Following his death, the commentary gantry at Wycombe Wanderers' Adams Park was renamed after Turnbull in his honour.

Media offices
Preceded by Darren Jordon	Weekend Presenter of BBC Breakfast; 2001–2008	Succeeded by Charlie Stayt
Preceded by Dermot Murnaghan	Weekday Presenter of BBC Breakfast; 2008–2016	Succeeded by Dan Walker
