= BBC Breakfast =

UK breakfast television news programme

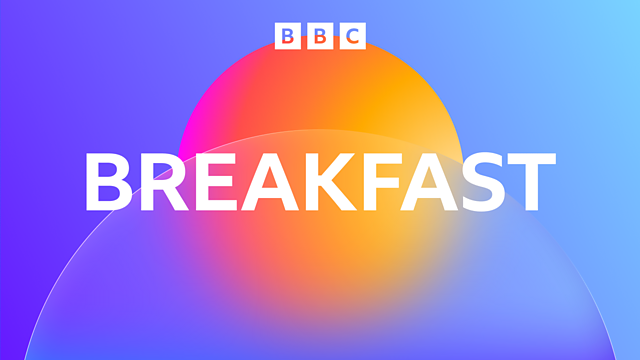
- Title card used since August 2026
- Also known as: Breakfast
- Created by: BBC News
- Presented by: Sally Nugent; Jon Kay; Naga Munchetty; Charlie Stayt
- Theme music composer: David Lowe
- Country of origin: United Kingdom
- Original language: English

Production
- Production locations: BBC Television Centre (2000–2012); BBC Quay House, MediaCityUK (2012–)
- Editor: Richard Frediani
- Running time: 210 minutes (weekdays) (2024–); 240 minutes (Saturdays)
- Production company: BBC News

Original release
- Network: BBC One
- Release: 2 October 2000 – present

Related
- BBC News at One; BBC News at Six; BBC News at Ten; BBC Weekend News

BBC Breakfast is a British television breakfast news programme, produced by BBC News and broadcast on BBC One Monday to Saturday mornings from 6:00 am. It is also occasionally broadcast on the UK feed of the BBC News channel. The simulcast is presented live, originally from the BBC Television Centre, London before moving in 2012 to MediaCityUK in Salford, Greater Manchester. The programme is broadcast daily and contains a mixture of news, sport, weather, business and feature items. When BBC Breakfast is not broadcast on BBC One, it is transmitted via BBC Two.

== Pre-BBC Breakfast history ==
Breakfast Time was the first BBC breakfast programme, with Ron Neil as producer. It was conceived in response to the plans of the commercial television company TV-am to introduce a breakfast television show. Breakfast Time's first broadcast was on 17 January 1983, and was presented by Frank Bough, Selina Scott and Nick Ross. The atmosphere of the set was intended to encourage a relaxed informality; the set mimicked a living-room rather than a studio, with red leather sofas, and Bough and Ross wearing jumpers and open-necked shirts. Ron Neil sought to make it part of the viewers' morning routine, with cookery, exercises, and (to some controversy) an astrologer Russell Grant. Breakfast Time lasted 150 minutes, initially being transmitted between 6:30 am and 9:00 am, before moving to a 6:50 am to 9:20 am slot on 18 February 1985.

Ron Neil departed from the programme and on 10 November 1986 a more conventional news focus was introduced featuring a news desk, presenters in suits and a shortened broadcast that began at 7:00 am and ended any time between 8:30 am and 8:55 am. Presenters included Kirsty Wark, John Stapleton, Jeremy Paxman and Sally Magnusson.

On 2 October 1989, the programme was renamed BBC Breakfast News and followed a more authoritative tone with a set modelled on the conventional desk style of news bulletins, starting at 6:30 am. The first edition was presented by Nicholas Witchell and Jill Dando. The business news coverage, launched with the new programme, was extended to an hour-long programme in its own right, called "Business Breakfast" in January 1993, beginning at 6:00 am, while BBC Breakfast News started at 7:00 am. In April 1993, both programmes moved to the then sixth floor N2 studio in a set used for the One, Six and Nine O'Clock News, using the new computer generated virtual set. A further revamp occurred in June 1997, when the programme was renamed as Breakfast News.

== BBC Breakfast history ==
On 2 October 2000, the merging of the separate breakfast programmes on BBC One and BBC News 24 into one programme, aired on both channels, called Breakfast started, with the first show hosted by Sophie Raworth and Jeremy Bowen. The studio was replaced with a new set on 30 June 2003. Since 3 April 2006, the BBC News channel has returned to its traditional format (starting at 8:30 am) while Breakfast continues on BBC One until 9:15 am. In April 2008, BBC News 24 was renamed "BBC News", as part of a £550,000 rebranding of the BBC's news output, complete with a new studio and presentation.

On 2 May 2006, Breakfast moved into studio N6 at Television Centre with other BBC One news programmes that required a larger set design that included walls of Barco video screens. The original screen scenes of cirrus clouds on a blue sky were changed as a result of viewer comments that 'it looked too cold'—their replacement was with orange squares of the same design as those appearing in the programme's new title sequence, which were designed to hide any joins or faults between the screens which had previously been obvious. The screens eventually displayed visuals needed for story content: different backgrounds, graphics and still photographs. The set had a generic visual style that could be used for other programmes, such as the national news bulletins, without much additional physical change. The programme celebrated its 20th anniversary on 17 January 2003.

On 28 January 2008, Breakfast returned to the TC7 studios, where Breakfast Time had been based following its move from the BBC Lime Grove Studios. On 2 March 2009, Breakfast relaunched with a new set and studio background. The backdrop resembled that of the BBC News channel as did the new Breakfast titles. In May 2009 as part of cost-cutting, the live broadcasts of the business news from the London Stock Exchange were dropped.

BBC Breakfast set in 2010 with Bill Turnbull and Sian Williams

In July 2010, the BBC announced that Breakfast was moving to their new studios in Salford Quays. The BBC announced that with the April 2012 move to Salford, co-presenter Sian Williams and sports presenter Chris Hollins preferred not be included in the move to the North of England. Williams left Breakfast on 15 March 2012.

On 12 December 2011, the first of several presenter changes was announced. Louise Minchin would, with the studio move to Salford, join the other main presenters of BBC Breakfast: Bill Turnbull, Susanna Reid and Charlie Stayt. Carol Kirkwood, on 26 March 2012, would remain in London presenting weather. Sports presenters Mike Bushell and Sally Nugent and business presenter Steph McGovern would locate to Salford. The first Breakfast edition from Salford occurred on Tuesday 10 April 2012. London-based newspapers have reported extensive criticism of the BBC move, but a decrease in audience did not occur, with the retention of an approximate average of 1.5 million viewers.

The 2012 Summer Olympics prompted BBC Breakfast to temporarily broadcast from a temporary studio near the Olympic Park in Stratford. During the Games, former presenters Sian Williams and Chris Hollins also returned to lead the morning programme, in addition to Bill Turnbull, Charlie Stayt, Louise Minchin, and BBC Sport presenter Hazel Irvine. The show ended its temporary London return with broadcasting from the BBC News channel's studio on the morning following the closing ceremonies before rebroadcasting from Salford the next day.

On 19 March 2013, BBC Breakfast updated its "lower thirds" to match the graphics and fonts used by the rest of BBC News since the previous day. The clock was consequently moved to the lower right side of the screen.

In 2014, Susanna Reid left the programme to join a revamped Good Morning Britain on ITV. Naga Munchetty became a regular presenter, hosting with Charlie Stayt from Thursday to Saturday every week, after a number of years as a relief presenter, including regularly presenting Sunday's programme. On 23 July 2014, the show went on location again, this time to Glasgow to showcase highlights from the 2014 Commonwealth Games. In the hours leading up to the opening ceremony, Carol Kirkwood reported from Celtic Park. The day after the end of the Games, Stayt presented from Glasgow Cathedral in the lead up to ceremonies marking 100 years since the start of World War I.

In February 2016, Bill Turnbull left the programme and was replaced by Dan Walker. For the 2016 Summer Olympics, the programme was again renamed Olympic Breakfast and was anchored by Salford and Rio broadcasting from the BBC Sport studio.

In September 2019, Naga Munchetty was initially ruled to have breached the BBC's guidelines by criticising US President Donald Trump for perceived racism. That July, while presenting BBC Breakfast, Munchetty had taken issue with Trump's comments telling his opponents to "go back" to the "places from which they came". Munchetty said: "Every time I have been told, as a woman of colour, to go back to where I came from, that was embedded in racism. Now I'm not accusing anyone of anything here, but you know what certain phrases mean." Several public figures, including Lenny Henry and Adrian Lester, signed an open letter asking the corporation to revisit its ruling against her. It was later reported in The Guardian that the complaint was also made against her co-host Dan Walker, but his comments were not the focus of the BBC's executive complaints unit (ECU) investigation, due to the complainant's follow up complaint focusing solely on Munchetty. Later that day, the Director-General of the BBC Tony Hall overturned the decision after looking into it personally.

In June 2021, Louise Minchin announced she would be leaving BBC Breakfast, 20 years after she joined the programme. Her final show was on 15 September 2021. From 20 September, Sally Nugent co-hosted alongside Dan Walker. On 27 October 2021, Nugent announced that she would permanently join the programme as the new Monday–Wednesday presenter. It was announced on 4 April 2022 that Dan Walker would be leaving Breakfast to join ITN to be a joint lead presenter for Channel 5 News. His final show was on 17 May 2022.

On 26 May 2022, the BBC announced that Breakfast, along with the BBC News at Six and Ten will be revamped in June 2022 to include a completely new studio and presentation, as part of a wider rebrand of the BBC. Local regional programmes will also be revamped over the coming months to tie in with the regional BBC channels broadcasting in HD by the beginning of 2023. It was announced on 8 July that Jon Kay would permanently replace Dan Walker after being a stand-in presenter for Breakfast.

After the unification of BBC News for UK viewers and international viewers in April 2023, the programme continues to be simulcast only on the UK feed, while the international feed shows generic bulletin and World Business Report. However, from January 2025 the simulcast with the UK feed was dropped on weekdays with the UK Feed showing generic bulletin and Business Today which are what international viewers get.

On 26 June 2023, BBC Breakfast unveiled a new look for the programme, moving to an all-new multipurpose studio in Media City in Salford.

On 29 November 2023, the BBC announced that BBC Breakfast would be extended by 15 minutes on weekdays, broadcasting until 9:30 am and followed by Morning Live, also extended by half an hour and broadcast until 10:45am. This change came into effect on 2 January 2024.

For the first few months of 2025, BBC Breakfast was not shown on weekdays on the BBC News Channel, with the news channel instead continuing to air the global news service. Breakfast did continue to air on the BBC News Channel at the weekend. However by spring 2025, Breakfast was, once again, airing every day on the BBC News Channel but on 29 October 2025, Breakfast was, once again, dropped from the News Channel's weekday schedule.

On 17 June 2026, the BBC announced that as part of its cost-savings plan, Breakfast will not be aired on Sundays. It was replaced with a simulcast of the BBC News channel on 27 September 2026. It was also announced that Naga Munchetty will leave the programme at the end of 2026 to become the new presenter of BBC Radio 5 Live's breakfast show.

== Format ==
Between 6:00 am and 9:30 am on weekdays, during the simulcast, the sports news is at approximately 6:30 am, 7:30 am and 8:30 am, plus 9:30am on a Saturday, after the news summary. In addition, live sports bulletins are broadcast from sporting locations, such as Royal Ascot and Wimbledon, with the presenter interviewing key sporting figures. The United Kingdom weather forecast is at 15 minutes and 45 minutes past the hour throughout the programme, either from the BBC Weather Centre in Broadcasting House, or out on location. Short regional news, travel and weather bulletins are broadcast just before the hour and the half-hour throughout the programme, with each bulletin running for 3 minutes and 15 seconds, and a 6-minute bulletin at 9:10 am.

During weekends, there are no updates from regional news bureaus. The first and/or second hour of the weekend edition may occasionally feature abridged versions of the BBC's other programmes such as Newswatch (shown on Saturdays at 7:45 am).

== Interactive ==
Breakfast encourages viewer response and interaction via e-mail, Facebook and Twitter. Video reports and interviews from the programme are made available on the Breakfast Facebook page after transmission.

== Current on-air team ==
Main presenters

Note: Sunday editions of BBC Breakfast are presented by one or two presenters from the regular stand-in presenting team

Tenure	Person	Days Presenting
2021–	Sally Nugent	Monday–Wednesday
2022–	Jon Kay	Monday–Wednesday
2008–	Charlie Stayt	Thursday–Saturday
2014–	Naga Munchetty	Thursday–Saturday

=== Stand-in presenters ===
Tenure	Person
2005–2007, 2023–	Sarah Campbell
2012–	Roger Johnson
2015–	Rachel Burden
2015–	Ben Thompson
2019–	Nina Warhurst
2021–	Luxmy Gopal
2025–	Emma Vardy
2026–	Lewis Vaughan Jones

=== Business presenters ===
Person	Position	Days Presenting	Notes
Emma Vardy	Main Presenter (rotating)	Monday–Thursdays	
Peter Ruddick	Main Presenter (rotating)	Monday–Thursdays	
Dan Whitworth	Main Presenter (rotating)	Monday–Thursdays	Radio 4 Money Box correspondent
Sarah Rogers	Relief Presenter	Stand-in days or Fridays	
Katy Austin	Relief Presenter	Stand-in days or Fridays	
Zoe Conway	Relief Presenter	Stand-in days or Fridays	

=== Sports presenters ===
Person	Position	Days Presenting
John Watson	Main Presenter	Monday–Wednesday
Mike Bushell	Main Presenter	Thursday–Saturday
Jane Dougall	Relief Presenter	Stand-in days
Chetan Pathak	Relief Presenter	Stand-in days
Hugh Ferris	Relief Presenter	Stand-in days
Olly Foster	Relief Presenter	Stand-in days
Ben Croucher	Relief Presenter	Stand-in days
Adam Wild	Relief Presenter	Stand-in days

=== Weather presenters ===
Tenure	Person	Position
2004–	Matt Taylor	Main Presenter
1998–	Louise Lear	Weekend & Relief Presenter
2000–	Helen Willetts	Weekend & Relief Presenter
2000–	Tomasz Schafernaker	Weekend & Relief Presenter
2001–	Chris Fawkes	Weekend & Relief Presenter
2001–	Susan Powell	Weekend & Relief Presenter
2007–	Stav Danaos	Weekend & Relief Presenter
2008–	Sarah Keith-Lucas	Weekend & Relief Presenter
2008–	Simon King	Weekend & Relief Presenter
2012–	Ben Rich	Weekend & Relief Presenter

=== Regular reporters ===
Person	Position
Graham Satchell	
John Maguire	
Tim Muffett	
Jayne McCubbin	
Lauren Moss	

=== Regular BBC contributors ===
Person	Position
Henry Zeffman	Politics
Paul Lewis	Personal Finance
David Sillito	Media & Arts
Lizo Mzimba	Entertainment

== Former presenters ==
=== Main ===
- Jeremy Bowen (2000–2002)
- Darren Jordon (2000–2001)
- Sarah Montague (2000–2001)
- Sophie Raworth (2000–2002)
- Bill Turnbull (2001–2016)
- Sian Williams (2001–2012)
- Natasha Kaplinsky (2002–2005)
- Dermot Murnaghan (2002–2007)
- Mishal Husain (2004–2006)
- Susanna Reid (2006–2014)
- Louise Minchin (2012–2021)
- Dan Walker (2016–2022)

=== Stand-in and guest ===
- Julie Etchingham (2000–2001)
- Michael Peschardt (2000–2007)
- Noel Thompson (2000–2009)
- Rob Bonnet (2000–2005)
- Tanya Beckett (2001–2003)
- Martine Dennis (2001)
- Susanna Reid (2001–2006)
- Louise Minchin (2001–2012)
- Chris Eakin (2002–2005)
- Ben Geoghegan (2002–2008)
- Jane Hill (2002–2004)
- Jon Sopel (2002–2010)
- Tim Willcox (2002–2004)
- Stephen Cole (2003–2004)
- Joanna Gosling (2003–2006)
- Simon McCoy (2004–2015)
- Kate Silverton (2005–2011)
- Julian Worricker (2006)
- Charlie Stayt (2006–2007)
- Chris Hollins (2008–2012)
- Sonia Deol (2008–2009)
- Naga Munchetty (2009–2014)
- Jon Kay (2009–2022)
- Robert Hall (2009)
- Nicholas Owen (2010–2013)
- Julia Somerville (2010)
- Clive Myrie (2010)
- Simon Jack (2010–2011)
- Victoria Derbyshire (2011, 2022)
- Adam Parsons (2011–2013)
- Sally Nugent (2011–2021)
- Fiona Armstrong (2012)
- Sian Lloyd (2012–2017)
- Steph McGovern (2012–2019)
- Christian Fraser (2014–2019)
- Katherine Downes (2014–2022)
- Victoria Valentine (2015–2023)
- Tina Daheley (2016–2023)
- Chris Mason (2017–2022)
- Babita Sharma (2018–2019)
- Martin Geissler (2020)
- Sima Kotecha (2020–2022)
- Hannah Miller (2022)
- Ben Boulos (2022–2026)

=== Sports ===
- Rob Bonnet (2000–2005)
- Sue Thearle (2000–2008)
- Chris Hollins (2005–2012)
- Katherine Downes (2012–2021)
- Ore Oduba (2013–2016)
- Holly Hamilton
- Gavin Ramjaun

=== Business ===
- Declan Curry (presenter 2000–2008)
- Max Foster (presenter and newsreader 2001–2005)
- Simon Jack (presenter 2008–2011)
- Maryam Moshiri (relief 2008–2011)
- Steph McGovern (presenter 2011–2019)
- Hannah Miller (presenter 2022–2023)
- Nick Eardley (guest 2023)
- Ben Boulos (presenter 2022–2026)

=== Weather ===
- Carol Kirkwood (presenter 2000–2026)
- Alex Deakin (presenter 2007–2016)
- Owain Wyn Evans (relief 2020–2022)

=== Newsreaders ===
- Kate Sanderson (2000–2004, occasional stand-in main presenter)
- Gillian Joseph (2004–2005, occasional stand-in main presenter)
- Moira Stuart (2000–2006)
- Suzanne Virdee (relief newsreader 2004–2006)

== Editorial team ==
Richard Frediani was appointed editor of BBC Breakfast in September 2019 after being appointed in July 2019. He was on leave for two weeks in June 2025, after bullying allegations were made against him. But reports in September 2025 said he was cleared. Frediani had replaced Adam Bullimore, who had held the role since 2013. Bullimore was previously the deputy editor for five years. Alison Ford, previously the UK Editor for BBC Newsgathering, was the editor of the programme until her death in July 2013. Her appointment followed the departure of David Kermode to 5 News.

== Regular guests ==
BBC Breakfast has a regular panel of experts who appear to provide specialist insight or analysis into news stories when they are required. In addition, the newspaper review on the weekends have a regular guest to provide commentary.

- Justin Urquhart Stewart (business expert)
- Kevin Maguire (political journalist)
- Dr. Rangan Chatterjee (doctor)
- Dr. Rosemary Leonard (doctor)
- Linda Papadopoulos (psychologist)
- Cary Cooper (psychologist)
- Ian McMillan (poet)
- Sally Hitchiner (vicar)
- Nazir Afzal (former Chief Crown Prosecutor)
- Simon Calder (travel expert)
- Bobby Seagull (maths expert)
- Peter Bradshaw (author and film critic)

== Out of studio broadcasts ==
Presenters make on-location broadcasts for particularly significant events.

The day after the September 11 attacks in New York City, Jeremy Bowen presented live near Ground Zero.

Dermot Murnaghan presented from Washington, D.C., to cover the 2004 US election. Bill Turnbull did the same for the 2008 US presidential election.

In the aftermath of the 7 July 2005 London bombings, Bill Turnbull presented live from King's Cross. Sian Williams reported live from the scene of the Indian Ocean earthquake in 2005.

Dermot Murnaghan presented from the 2006 election campaign from Bristol.

In September 2009, Kate Silverton presented from Lashkargāh, Afghanistan. The programme returned to Afghanistan on 27 and 28 June 2014, when Bill Turnbull presented from Camp Bastion to celebrate Armed Forces Day. Turnbull presented live from Brighton for the September 2009 Liberal Democrats Conference, while Sian Williams presented from the Labour and Conservative Party Conferences.

Susanna Reid presented from the 2010 Academy Awards Ceremony. On 6 April 2010, Sian Williams presented from Westminster in the run-up to the announcement of the 2010 General Election. During April and May 2010, Bill Turnbull presented and reported from various locations on the party campaign trail throughout the country. On 30 April 2010, Charlie Stayt presented the programme from the University of Birmingham following the final leaders' debate of the election campaign. On 12 May 2010, Sian Williams presented the programme from College Green, Westminster the day after David Cameron became Prime Minister. Bill Turnbull also presented from outside 10 Downing Street.

Following the Cumbria shootings the previous day, Bill Turnbull presented live from the town of Whitehaven on 3 June 2010. Turnbull presented on the progress of the Olympic Park in Stratford, East London, on 27 July 2010, two years before the opening ceremony of the 2012 Summer Olympics. Turnbull presented from the September 2010 Liberal Democrats conference in Liverpool and the Labour Conference in Manchester. Sian Williams presented from the October 2010 Conservative Party Conference in Birmingham.

On 19 May 2012, Louise Minchin presented the first day of the 2012 Olympics Torch Relay from Lands End with Charlie Stayt presenting from the BBC Breakfast studio. From 27 July to 12 August, BBC Breakfast rebranded to Olympic Breakfast and presented from a temporary studio built for the 2012 Olympics with a view of the Queen Elizabeth Olympic Park in the background.

A special split edition of the programme aired for the wedding of Prince William and Kate Middleton, with Sian presenting from Westminster Abbey and Bill live from Buckingham Palace. Naga Munchetty later presented from Windsor Castle to mark the wedding of Prince Harry and Meghan Markle.

On 17 April 2013, Charlie Stayt presented the show from St Paul's Cathedral, London for a special split edition in the build-up of the funeral of Baroness Margaret Thatcher.

On 13 March 2015, Bill Turnbull presented from St Paul's Cathedral, London in the lead up to a special service of remembrance to mark the end of operations in Afghanistan.

On 12 June 2016, Louise Minchin presented from outside Buckingham Palace in the lead up to the finale of the Queen's 90th Birthday celebrations. Naga Munchetty presented from outside the Palace of Westminster covering the aftermath of the United Kingdom's European Union membership referendum results.

Charlie Stayt and Sally Nugent presented live from Westminster the day after the 2017 terror attack. During a special edition focusing on the Manchester terror attack that took place the previous night, Louise Minchin presented from outside Manchester Arena where the attack happened, and Dan Walker presented in the studio. Naga Munchetty presented from Borough Market in the aftermath of the London Bridge terror attack. Stayt and Minchin spoke to MPs in Westminster on 10 June 2017 about the hung Parliament result from 8 June.

On 17 April 2021, Charlie Stayt presented BBC Breakfast from Windsor Castle on the day of Prince Philip, Duke of Edinburgh funeral with Naga Munchetty presenting the show from the studio.

On 19 September 2022, Jon Kay and Sally Nugent presented BBC Breakfast from Westminster Abbey on the day of Queen Elizabeth II state funeral.

On 25 October 2022, Jon Kay presented BBC Breakfast from Downing Street on the day Rishi Sunak became Prime Minister of the United Kingdom, while Victoria Fritz presented in the studio.

On 14 July 2024, Sally Nugent and John Watson presented BBC Breakfast from Berlin, on the day of the Euro 2024 final (England vs Spain) while Rachel Burden presented in the Salford studio.

== Video podcast ==
In September 2006, Breakfast launched its own video podcast called the Breakfast Takeaway. BBC News had already launched three other services: Newsnight, the Ten O'Clock News and STORYFix (also previously shown on television at weekends on News 24). The Breakfast Takeaway was available Monday to Friday in MP4 format where it could be downloaded and viewed from a home or office computer.

The video podcasts were a one-year trial. After the BBC reviewed the trial, the podcasts were discontinued in July 2007.

== Specials ==
In 2003, the Breakfast production team was commissioned by BBC One to make a week long series called The Day Team From Chatsworth, presented by Nicki Chapman and presenter of the BBC's Countryfile programme, John Craven. It took a behind-the-scenes look at the stately home Chatsworth House, and was broadcast separately on BBC One at 10:30 am.

A number of other guests or celebrity presenters have been used on Breakfast to present themed days or weeks, even though some have never been mainstream news reporters or presenters. Many of these have seen the programme extended to 9:30 am.

- Alistair Appleton: Tate Modern 2004, Bath, Somerset 2003
- Chris Beardshaw: Chelsea Flower Show 2006
- Jennie Bond: Buckingham Palace 2004
- Nicki Chapman: Children in Need November 2005, London Fashion Week 2004, Chelsea Flower Show 2006
- Philippa Forrester: Alder Hey Children's Hospital 2002
- Andi Peters: Neighbours set 2005, EastEnders/Albert Square outside broadcast 2006
- Gaby Roslin: Wimbledon Tennis Championships outside broadcast 2002
- Tim Wonnacott: Christie's Auction Room 2004

== Awards and nominations ==
Year	Award	Category	Result	Ref.
2003	TRIC Awards	Best Morning/Daytime Programme	Nominated	
2004	TRIC Awards	Best Morning/Daytime Programme	Won	
2005	TRIC Awards	Best Morning/Daytime Programme	Won	
2006	TRIC Awards	Best Morning/Daytime Programme	Won	
2007	TRIC Awards	Best Daytime Programme	Nominated	
2009	TRIC Awards	Best Daytime Programme	Nominated	
2010	TRIC Awards	Best Daytime Programme	Won	
2011	TRIC Awards	Best Daytime Programme	Nominated	
2011	National Television Awards	Best Topical Magazine Programme	Nominated	
2012	TRIC Awards	Best Daytime Programme	Nominated	
2015	TRIC Awards	Best Daytime Programme	Nominated	
2016	TRIC Awards	Best Daytime Programme	Nominated	
2017	TRIC Awards	Best Daytime Programme	Nominated	
2018	TRIC Awards	Best Daytime Programme	Nominated	
2019	TRIC Awards	Best Daytime Programme	Nominated	
2021	TRIC Awards	Best Multi-Channel News	Nominated	
2021	RTS Television Journalism Awards	Scoop of the Year	Won	
2021	RTS Television Journalism Awards	Daily News Programme of the Year	Nominated	
2022	TRIC Awards	Best Multi-Channel News	Nominated	
2024	TRIC Awards	Best News Programme	Nominated	
2025	RTS Programme Awards	Best Daytime Programme	Nominated	
2025	British Academy Television Awards	Best News Coverage	Won	

== See also ==
- Breakfast television
- Today (BBC Radio 4)
- Timeline of breakfast television in the United Kingdom
