= Aid Still Required =

Aid Still Required (ASR) is a non-profit 501(c)(3) organization committed to bringing attention and humanitarian aid to areas suffering from natural disasters or human crises. Incorporated in Santa Monica, California, US, in 2008. The name, "Aid Still Required" and the mission were born out of the need to bring these issues back into the spotlight after they have left the news headlines and public awareness. Future project locations are Thailand, Appalachia, NYC First Responders, Haiti, and the Gulf Oil.

== Southeast Asia ==
In December 2004, the tsunami in Southeast Asia claimed 230,000 lives and destroyed the livelihood of millions of families and communities in 12 different nations. In response to the tsunami, Aid Still Required founders, Hunter and Andrea Herz Payne created its first project: a CD compilation endorsed by former United States President Bill Clinton's United Nations Office of the Special Envoy for Tsunami Relief. The CD contains tracks by musicians such as Paul McCartney, Norah Jones, Avril Lavigne, James Taylor, Sarah McLachlan, Bonnie Raitt, John Lennon, Eric Clapton, Shawn Colvin, Ani DiFranco, Maroon 5, Beth Nielsen Chapman, Phantom Planet, The Blind Boys of Alabama, Ray Charles, and ASR founder and president, Hunter Payne. ASR are currently working on two projects in Southeast Asia.

=== Indonesia ===
Banda Aceh was the region most damaged by the tsunami where 160,000 people were lost. The livelihoods of many survivors were destroyed when the rush of seawater decimated the reef protecting the region virtually destroying the day-fishing industry.

Proceeds from the Aid Still Required CD supports a local Aceh NGO called Yayasan Lamjabat's Ujung Pancu Project which is a job training center, specializing in sustainable and environmentally friendly development, conservation, and disaster-preparedness. The project is located 6 miles from Banda Aceh at the most northern end of the mountain range that runs from West Sumatra to Aceh.

The Ujung Pancu Project provides reforestation and seaweed cultivation programs, teaches the community how to transition to organic and fish farming, and addresses the rights and protection of women, children, and the elderly.

=== Sri Lanka ===
Following the tsunami, officials from the United Nations Development Program (UNDP) suggested the creation of a tsunami early warning system for Southeast Asia. If one had been in place prior to December 2004, hundreds of thousands of lives could have been saved.

Though the northeastern coast of Sri Lanka took the direct brunt of the wave, the tsunami was so forceful that waters smashed into the coast on the opposite side of the island as well, causing mass destruction to the southwestern coastal village of Peraliya, among others. The wave was so powerful, it created the world's largest train disaster by derailing the Queen of the Seas Colombo-Galle Express train which killed 1700 people. It is estimated that in Peraliya village alone, 2,500 people perished. Only eight walls from the 490 village homes remained standing.

ASR has identified a local tsunami warning center in Peraliya, a coastal village in southwestern Sri Lanka to support. The Community Tsunami Early Warning Center (CTEC ) was begun by international volunteers and has plans to expand to a total of four centers along the coast. Research is also under way exploring the possibility of exporting the program to the Indonesian and Thai coastlines. In addition to supplying a public address system, CTEC strives to create an empowered community, educated and prepared, and to rediscover traditional and local knowledge of signals that predict natural disasters.

The village of Peraliya is featured in The Third Wave. Upon hearing about the tsunami, Australian humanitarian medic and 9/11 first-responder Alison Thompson and partner Oscar Gubernati came to Sri Lanka to provide assistance and ended up in Peraliya. Their original plan of volunteering for two weeks turned into a two-year life-altering journey in which they established a refugee camp, a local medical center, both flourishing today, and CTEC, the first and only early-warning center of its kind in the entire region. The film's title, The Third Wave, refers to the wave of volunteers who came to provide aid to the region.

== Darfur, Sudan ==
=== The Village Restoration and Advancement Initiative (VRAI) ===
Christie Communications and Aid Still Required have collaborated in the development of The Village Reforestation and Advancement Initiative. It utilizes age-old farming techniques and irrigation systems to help stop desertification and environmental degradation and to regenerate the soil, thereby restoring self-sufficiency to villagers. The initiative is focused on planting forest breaks to stop the desert creep, protect villages, and revitalize the land. Its similar desert topography to the Darfur region bodes well for success of VRAI in Darfur. Due to violence surrounding the Spring 2010 Sudanese elections, piloting this venture in Darfur is still dangerous at this time. Christie and Aid Still Required are exploring partnerships in the region.

== Hurricane Katrina ==
On August 29, 2005, Hurricane Katrina hit the Gulf of Mexico and quickly became the costliest natural disaster in American history ($81.2 billion) causing severe damage in Mississippi, Alabama, and Louisiana. Worst hit was New Orleans where 80% of the city was covered in floodwater, 1,836 people died, and over 200,000 homes were destroyed. Aid Still Required has identified the first two projects it would like to support in New Orleans.

=== Wetlands restoration ===
The wetlands of the Gulf Coast have provided natural protection against hurricane flood for centuries as every 2.7 miles of wetlands can reduce a storm surge by one foot. Decades of dredging in the waters off the Louisiana coast, however, in conjunctions with the construction of the Mississippi River Gulf Outlet (MRGO), have severely degraded the wetlands in and around the New Orleans delta. In addition to floodwater protections, these wetlands are home to 25% of the total domestic marine catch, including shrimp, crabs, and crawfish.

Often referred to as "the hurricane highway", MRGO creates a direct pathway from the Gulf of Mexico to the inner harbor of New Orleans. A Louisiana State University report states that MRGO may have made the storm surge 20% higher and two or three times faster as it hit the city. MRGO has experienced consistent erosion since its construction in the 1960s and is now three times wider than originally built. Constructed in large part to facilitate passage of larger ships, it has developed shoals, which now make it impassable to those same vessels. The Army Corps of Engineers has recommended that the outlet be closed, but the plan has not yet been approved.

Recognizing the importance of the wetlands as a natural barrier for New Orleans and their importance to the region's native wildlife, Aid Still Required is researching various means of restoration. The Gulf Coast Oil Spill which began in April 2010 is bringing heightened awareness to the issue. Common Ground Relief is a local organization that is working on wetlands restoration, establishing a local nursery and utilizing volunteers to rehabilitate portions of the bayou and to rebuild and restore homes in the Lower Ninth Ward.

=== The New Orleans Floating Townhouses ===
During Hurricane Katrina in the St. Roch area of New Orleans, floodwaters destroyed foundations of many buildings and homes. ASR has proposed a project to utilize sustainability and protect the homes by using zero energy consumption and making the homes floatable in case of another catastrophe.

== Collaborations ==
=== Darfur PSA campaign with NBA players ===
The Aid Still Required NBA Campaign for Darfur began many months before Aid Still Required officially became a nonprofit. A letter that founder Andrea Herz Payne had written expressing concern over investments funding the crisis in Darfur ended up in the hands of NBA Cavaliers player Ira Newble. Ira contacted Sudan expert Smith College professor Eric Reeves and the seeds for NBA player involvement began. Hunter and Andrea saw the potential impact NBA players could make on raising awareness about the Darfur crisis and started contacting players and the press. In fall 2007, Participant Media contacted the Paynes asking for their assistance in creating the Darfur Now PSA Campaign. The Paynes enrolled Olympic athlete Rafer Johnson, NBA players Steve Nash, Baron Davis, Ira Newble, Eric Snow, and Matt Barnes, actors Lauren Conrad and Kristoff St. John, and humanitarian Lauren Bush in the campaign. Five members of their hometown team, The Los Angeles Lakers (Kobe Bryant, Derek Fisher, Andrew Bynum, Trevor Ariza, and Luke Walton). Kobe Bryant's PSA launched the Aid Still Required website the day it aired on ESPN, March 4, 2008, which also included an interview with Grant Hill about Darfur.

=== Participant media ===
Darfur Now PSA Campaign, Darfur Now Roundtable. Darfur Now Roundtable In the summer of 2008, Participant Media asked Aid Still Required to host a Roundtable discussion for the entertainment and nonprofit communities. Los Angeles Lakers Derek Fisher and actor Don Cheadle co-hosted; keynote speakers were former State Department Africa specialist, humanitarian and activist John Prendergast of The Enough Project and Omer Ismail of Darfur Peace and Development Organization.

=== Thecommunity.com/ Universal Declaration of Human Rights (UDHR) Campaign ===
Commencing in December 2009. The 14th Dalai Lama, Archbishop Desmond Tutu, actors Morgan Freeman, Anne Archer, Nancy Cartwright, Priscilla Presley, Joel Madden. Actress CCH Pounder, Los Angeles Lakers Andrew Bynum, Luke Walton, Josh Powell, Didier "D.J" Mbenga, and Jordan Farmar, former NBA All-Star Bill Walton, and activist Daniel Ellsberg participated at ASR's request.

=== Hans Zimmer and The Remote Control Foundation ===
"Save An Angel" Mother's Day Campaign with Hans Zimmer and teenage songstress Rachel Eskenazi-Gold. Former NFL Player, humanitarian and Milken Institute staffer Rosey Grier contributed a PSA for Aid Still Required.
