= Farouk Abu Issa =

Sudanese politician (1933–2020)

- فاروق أبو عيسى

Sudanese Foreign Minister
- In office 1969–1971
- President: Gaafar Nimeiry
- Preceded by: Gaafar Nimeiry
- Succeeded by: Mansour Khalid

Personal details
- Born: 12 August 1933 Wad Madani, Al Jazirah state, Sudan
- Died: 12 April 2020 (aged 86) Al Riadh, Khartoum, Sudan
- Party: National Consensus Forces
- Other political affiliations: Sudanese Communist Party (1950–1971)
- Children: 1+
- Education: Alexandria University

Farouk Abu Issa (Arabic: فاروق أبو عيسى; 12 August 1933 – 12 April 2020) was a Sudanese politician and the Chairman of the National Consensus Forces.

Abu Issa attended the prestigious Hantoub Secondary School and was involved in activism from a young age; he joined the Sudanese Communist Party in 1950. His father was a member of the political party Ashiqqa' and supported peace between Sudan and Egypt. Abu Issa graduated from Alexandria University with a degree in law in 1957 and subsequently joined the Egyptian Communist Party.

He was Sudanese Foreign Minister under Jaafar Nimeiry from 1969 to 1971. When the Sudanese Communist Party split from Nimeiry in 1970, Abu Issa withdrew from the party, though he continued to hold democratic sentiments. In 1983, he was elected as the Secretary General of the Arab Lawyers Union; he held this position until 2003. He fled to Egypt in 1989 after Omar al-Bashir overtook the government and stayed in exile until 2005 when the Comprehensive Peace Agreement was signed. He became the chairman of the National Consensus Forces' general council and held this position until his death in 2020.

In December 2014 he was arrested along with Amin Mekki Medani, held in Kobar Prison, and subsequently charged with undermining the constitutional system. He was released from prison two and a half weeks later and taken to a hospital in Khartoum due to rapidly deteriorating health.
