= January 2025 Saudi Hospital attack =

2025 hospital airstrike in Sudan

2025 Saudi Hospital airstrike
- Part of War crimes during the Sudanese civil war (2023–present)
- Location: El Fasher, Sudan
- Date: January 24, 2025
- Attack type: Drone attack
- Deaths: 70
- Injuries: 19–100
- Perpetrator: Rapid Support Forces

On 24 January 2025, the Rapid Support Forces hit the Saudi Maternal Teaching Hospital in El Fasher with drones while they were attacking Sudanese Armed Forces positions in the city. The attack left at least 70 people dead and was condemned internationally. It was also among the deadliest attacks on the Hospital since the start of the war, until 460 people were killed in the hospital during the El Fasher massacre.

== Background ==
The Saudi Maternal Teaching Hospital was one of the last functioning hospital in El Fasher prior to the attack. At the time of the attack, between 70 and 80 percent of all health care facilities in the country had gone out of service. The hospital had also previously come under shelling, with staff recording 28 deaths and 50 injuries over shelling over the last month.

The strike came after recent gains by the SAF, taking control of the El-Jeili oil refinery and breaking the siege of the Signal Corps headquarters in Khartoum. The city had been under a siege with the RSF attempting several times to take control of it as it is one of the last strongholds the SAF has in Darfur. RSF had also sent a 48 ultimatum for the SAF and allied forces to leave El Fasher previous to the attack.

== Attack ==
On January 24, 2025, the hospital's emergency ward was hit by drones. According to the SAF, the drones were Chinese made Wing Loong 2 models operated by the RSF. The hospital's emergency and surgical wards were completely destroyed in the attack. Although it was not immediately clear who had committed the attack, the Sudanese Foreign Ministry along with many local officials said that the drones were launched by the RSF. The RSF denied the claims, stating that the SAF had committed the attack and was trying to spread propaganda, but did not give any evidence to prove this.

=== Casualties ===
By January 25, reports stated that the death toll stood at 30 people with dozens more injured, though the death toll rose to 67 later in the day. The World Health Organization would later report that 70 people had been killed and 19 more had been injured, though the North Darfur health ministry would state that 100 people were injured. The attack also left at least 4 children, 1 girl and 3 boys, dead and 3 more injured.

== Reactions ==
=== Domestic ===
Sudan's Ministry of Foreign Affairs made a statement calling the strike a heinous crime and a "new embodiment of a genocide strategy" being pursued by the RSF. They also said that the strike was a response to recent defeats, and that it was enabled due to international inaction and the United Nations' Security Council failing to implement UNSC resolution 2736.

=== International ===
- United Nations – The UN's Humanitarian Coordinator in Sudan, Clementine Nkweta-Salami, condemned the attack and expressed her solidarity with the people of Sudan. The executive director of UNICEF, Catherine M. Russell, said "This heinous attack is a blatant violation of children's rights. Children are being killed and injured in the very places where they should be safest from harm" and called for violence in the country to end.
- United Arab Emirates – Minister of state Sheikh Shakhboot bin Nahyan Al Nahyan condemned the attack and reaffirmed the country's position on a peaceful solution to the conflict.
- Iran – Foreign Ministry spokesperson Esmail Baghaei condemnded the attack.
- Saudi Arabia – The Foreign Ministry called the attack a violation of international and humanitarian law and called for restraint from both sides to prevent further civilian attacks.
- Pakistan – The Ministry of Foreign Affairs made a statement condemning the attack, expressing sympathy for the victims and their families, and emphasizing the need to protect healthcare facilities and uphold humanitarian principles.
- Kuwait – The Ministry of Foreign Affairs said in a statement that the attack was a clear violation of humanitarian law and sent their condolences to the victims of the attack. They also called for implementing UNSC resolution 2736.
- Canada – In a statement on Twitter, the Foreign ministry strongly condemned the attack and called for the protection of health care workers and facilities under all circumstances.

The attack was also condemned by the Arab League, the Muslim World League, the Gulf Cooperation Council, and the Arab Parliament.

== See also ==
- October 2024 Sudan airstrikes
- Kabkabiya market airstrike
- May 2023 Mayo shelling
- 2025 Omdurman market attack
