= Mariam al-Mahdi =

Sudanese doctor and politician (born 1965)

- مريم الصادق المهدي
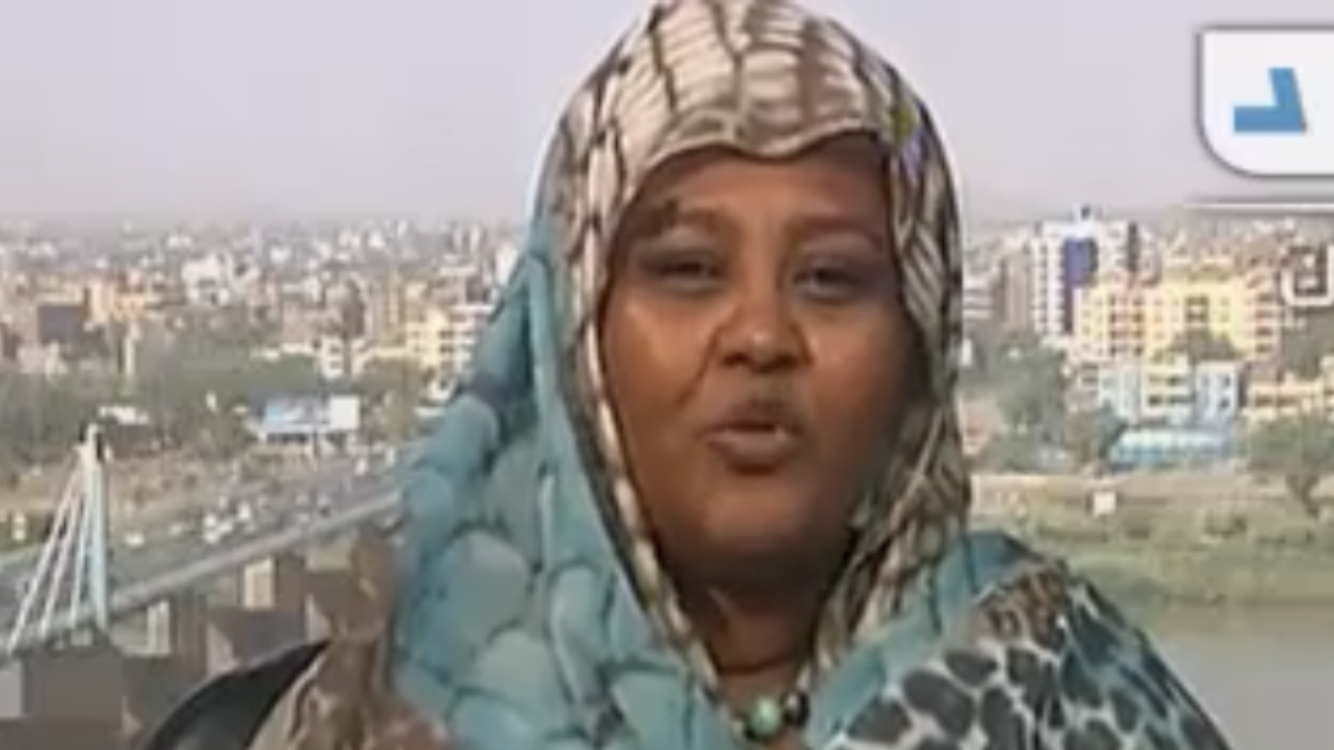
- al-Mahdi in 2013.

Foreign Minister of Sudan
- In office 11 February 2021 – 22 November 2021
- Prime Minister: Abdalla Hamdok
- Preceded by: Omer Ismail (acting)
- Succeeded by: Ali al-Sadiq Ali

Personal details
- Born: 1965 (age 60–61) Omdurman, Sudan
- Party: National Umma Party
- Parent: Sadiq al-Mahdi (father)
- Education: University of Jordan

Mariam al-Sadiq al-Mahdi (Arabic: مريم الصادق المهدي; born 1965) is a Sudanese politician, the leader of the National Umma Party, and the Sudanese Minister of Foreign Affairs from 11 February 2021 until her resignation on 22 November 2021. She is the daughter of Sadiq al-Mahdi, an opposition leader and former Prime Minister of Sudan, and a member of the central body of the party.

== Early life ==
al-Mahdi was born in Omdurman in 1965. She joined the Umma Party and eventually reached a leadership position within it. She received her first degree in general medicine from the University of Jordan in 1991, followed by a degree in tropical paediatric medicine from Liverpool School of Tropical Medicine in 1995. She practiced medicine for six years as a general practitioner in the mid-1990's in Sudan’s children hospitals. al-Mahdi received a higher diploma in development and gender issues from Ahfad University for Women in Omdurman in 2006, and a Bachelor of Law from Neelain University in Sudan in 2013.

== Political career ==
On 30 January 2019, the opposition National Umma Party announced that the security authorities had arrested the party’s vice president, Mariam Al-Mahdi. According to the party leaders, al-Mahdi was arrested from her home in Khartoum. This comes within the framework of the protests in Sudan since 19 December 2019, and in the wake of the government’s decision to release political detainees. The next day, Mariam was released, after an arrest that lasted for several hours. On 10 March 2019, she was arrested again and was sentenced to a week in jail but was released three days later. She stressed that Sudan’s removal from the United States state sponsors of terrorism list was of the utmost importance but refused to link it to the Israel-Sudan normalization agreement.

== Minister of Foreign Affairs ==
On February 11, 2021, al-Mahdi assumed the position of Sudanese Minister of Foreign Affairs in Abdalla Hamdok's government. She is the second woman to hold that position after Asma Mohamed Abdalla.

After the October 2021 Sudanese coup d'état, the Financial Times listed al-Mahdi as one of the 25 most influential women of 2021 and described her "as one of [the military's] most outspoken critics and as a voice for all the women who took to the streets to campaign for change." Two days after the coup, U.S. Secretary of State Antony Blinken spoke with al-Mahdi to express the U.S.'s "condemnation of the military takeover" and urged the immediate release of detained civilian leaders. On 22 November 2021, she along with eleven other ministers resigned in protest over the political agreement between Prime Minister Hamdok and Sudanese Armed Forces Commander and Transitional Sovereignty Council Chairman General Abdel Fattah al-Burhan, later calling it a setback for the country's democratic transition.
