= Amin Mekki Medani =

Sudanese lawyer, diplomat and activist (1939–2018)

- د. أمين مكي مدني

Minister of Labour and Social Affairs, Administrative Development, Peace
- In office 1985–1986

Personal details
- Born: 2 February 1939 Wad Madani, Al Jazirah state, Anglo-Egyptian Sudan
- Died: 31 August 2018 (aged 79)
- Children: 5
- Education: University of Khartoum; University of Luxembourg; University of London; University of Edinburgh
- Occupation: Lawyer

Amin Mekki Medani (2 February 1939 – 31 August 2018) (Arabic: د. ٱمين مكي مدني) was a Sudanese lawyer, diplomat, human rights and political activist. He was the president of the Confederation of Sudanese Civil Society, Vice President of Civil Society Initiative, and President of the Sudan Human Rights Monitor (SHRM). He served as head of the Office of the High Commissioner for Human Rights (OHCHR) office in the West Bank and Gaza, Chief of Mission of the OHCHR in Zagreb, Croatia, legal advisor to the Special Representative of the U.N Secretary-General in Iraq as well as Afghanistan, and a Regional Representative for the OHCHR in Beirut, Lebanon. He was the 1991 recipient of the Human Rights Watch Award for Human Rights Monitoring and 1991 Recipient of the American Bar Association Human Rights Award, as well as the 2013 recipient for the European Union Human Rights award and served as an early board member of Civicus.

== Early life ==
Born on February 2, 1939, in Wad Madani, Al Jazeera, Anglo-Egyptian Sudan. His father, Mekki Medani Osman Arabi, was a leading figure in Sudanese hydraulic engineering and served as one of the first Sudanese Undersecretaries of the Ministry of Irrigation (“وكيل وزارة الري") in the postcolonial period, leading important projects of the time such as the Roseiries Dam and Rahad Irrigation Project. He was also a Umma Party member of government ("المجلس المركزي") and a descendant of the 19th century Islamic scholar and judge, Al-Qadi Arabi Ahmed Al-Hawwari. Medani’s mother was a descendant of Ilyas Pasha Um Barir, a powerful Jaali 19th century merchants who became ruler of Kordofan during the Turko-Egyptian and Mahdist periods, as well as the Jaali Mahdist Emir Abdelsalam wad Haj Bala. Medani was also a cousin of Sudanese artist Ibrahim El-Salahi, and Sovereign Council Member Aisha Musa el-Said, as well as renowned Sudanese poet Ishaaq El-halangi.

== Education ==
After graduating from the elite British-style boarding school, Hantoub, Mekki Medani studied law at the University of Khartoum, obtaining his LLB. with (Honours) at the Second Class, Upper Division. Shortly after, in 1964, he was awarded a Dipl. Civ.L. (Civil Law) from the University of Luxembourg. He then went on to complete a masters of law (LLM) with distinction at the University of London in 1965, and finally in 1970, he completed his PhD in Comparative Criminal Law at the University of Edinburgh.

== Career ==
In 1962 after obtaining his LLB, he started working as a magistrate in the Judiciary of Sudan. In 1966, upon his return from London after completing his first post-graduate degree, he joined the faculty of law at Khartoum University, as a Senior Scholar and Lecturer until 1971. After this, he became the Acting Representative of the United Nations High Commissioner for Refugees in Tanzania, and continued working for international institutions, later on becoming one of the first black Attorneys at the World Bank in Washington, D.C. In 1976, having returned to Khartoum, Medani started working at the Arab Bank for Economic Development in Africa, in this time he also became more involved in activism to promote democratic governance, human rights, and the rule of law in Sudan. Following the 1985 popular people's uprising that overthrew the Nimeiry dictatorship, he served in the Transitional Government of Sudan as Cabinet Minister for Labour, Social Affairs, Peace, and Administrative Development, until the democratic election of former Prime Minister Sadiq al-Mahdi. In 1991, Medani was arrested following the coup d'etat that brought Omar al-Bashir to power, and subsequently expelled from Sudan by the government, causing him to migrate to Cairo and work at the Egyptian Bar Association.

After his departure from Egypt, Medani played a role in the establishment and chairmanship of the field office of the Office of the Commissioner for Human Rights in the Occupied Palestinian Territories in 1996, and eventually went on to serve as the head of Office of the High Commissioner for Human Rights (OHCHR) office in the West Bank and Gaza. He also served as the Chief of Mission of the OHCHR in Zagreb, Croatia, legal advisor to the Special Representative of the U.N Secretary-General in Iraq as well as Afghanistan, and a Regional Representative for the OHCHR in Beirut, Lebanon. During his tenure in Baghdad, Medani witnessed and was injured in the Canal Hotel bombing that killed former United Nations Commissioner for Human Rights and Special Representative to Iraq, Sérgio Vieira de Mello.

=== Elkarib & Medani ===
In 1978, Amin Mekki Medani co-founded El Karib & Medani Advocates (EKM) alongside Eltigani El Karib, establishing what is widely recognized as Sudan's largest and most successful law firm. Based in Khartoum, the firm operates as a "one-stop shop" for legal services, specializing in corporate and commercial law, international investment, banking, and energy. EKM is particularly noted for its expertise in oil and gas arbitrations and represents high-profile clients including multinational corporations, development banks, and several foreign embassies. Consistently ranked in Band 1 by Chambers and Partners, the firm has earned numerous international accolades, including being named "Country Winner" for Sudan by The Lawyers Global for multiple consecutive years.

=== “The Sudan Call” ===
In December 2014, after returning from the signing of the Sudan Call held in Addis Ababa, Medani, who had signed the document as President of the Civil Society Initiative was arrested, along with Farouk Abu Eissa, Chairman of the National Consensus Forces, and others when a large number of personnel from the Sudanese National Intelligence and Security Services (NISS) agents, arrived at his home in Khartoum just before midnight on Saturday, 6 December. Although his family was not informed of the reasons for the arrest, it is believed he was arrested for signing, the Sudan Call, a statement signed by representatives from political and armed opposition parties across the country, to work towards the ending of the conflicts in Sudan in Darfur, South Kordofan and Blue Nile and build a foundation for a lasting democracy based on equal citizenship and comprehensive peace. He had been held incommunicado in an unknown location until 21 December 2014, when Medani was transferred to Kober Prison in Khartoum. On 22 December, Medani was finally permitted to meet with his lawyers and two days later with his family. On January 10, 2015, he was charged under Article 50 (undermining the constitutional system) and Article 51 (waging war against the state) in the 1991 Criminal Code. His trial before a special court created under the 1991 anti-terror law started on February 23. He was released five months later on April 9, 2015.

== Death ==
On August 31, 2018, after being denied permission to leave the country by the government and suffering from a long battle with heart disease and kidney failure, Medani died. His death was mourned as a loss for the fight for human rights and democracy.

== Amin Mekki Medani Foundation and Legacy ==
In 2018, shortly after his death, the Amin Mekki Medani Foundation was founded. The foundation focuses on the supporting activists and encouraging the pursuit of human rights, civil and political liberties, and democracy. The 'Amin Mekki Regional Training Course on Human Rights Protection Mechanisms' was set up by the Geneva Institute for Human Rights and Humanitarian Affairs in his honour shortly after his death.

In November 2022, the African Commission on Human and Peoples' Rights issued a landmark ruling in the case of Amin Mekki Medani and Farouk Abu Issa v. Sudan (Communication 511/15), finding the Republic of Sudan liable for multiple human rights violations stemming from the December 2014 arbitrary arrest and detention of the two lawyers. The Commission determined that Sudan violated the victims' rights to liberty, security, and freedom from torture, as well as their rights to a fair trial, expression, and association after they were targeted for signing the "Sudan Call" democratic reform declaration. As a result, the Commission ordered Sudan to provide reparations to the victims and their families and recommended legislative reforms to the National Security Act to prevent future abuses.
