= Rapid Support Forces atrocities in Khartoum =

The Rapid Support Forces (RSF), a paramilitary in Sudan, have been implicated numerous atrocities committed in the Sudanese capital of Khartoum since 15 April 2023, which is when both the Battle of Khartoum and the wider Sudanese civil war began. These atrocities have drawn widespread condemnation from various countries and human rights organizations, and are under investigation as potential war crimes and crimes against humanity.

The RSF established makeshift detention centres in and around Khartoum, where civilians, mostly young men, were detained, tortured, and in many cases executed. Multiple human rights organisations, including Amnesty International, have documented cases in which women and girls were raped, gang-raped, and held in sexual slavery by RSF fighters.

== Background ==
The Battle of Khartoum was a major strategic battle for control of Khartoum, the capital of Sudan, with fighting in and around the city between the paramilitary Rapid Support Forces (RSF), and the Sudanese Armed Forces (SAF), as part of the civil war. The battle began on 15 April 2023, after the RSF captured Khartoum International Airport, several military bases, and the presidential palace in an attempted coup d'état, starting an escalating series of clashes. The battle was also the longest continuous battle in Sudanese history, the longest battle in an African capital ever, the longest in North African history and is one of the deadliest recorded battles in Sudanese and African history, with over 61,000 deaths. The battle was also marked by its gruelling urban warfare.

It was initially reported that tensions rose in Khartoum and Merowe on 13 April 2023, when RSF forces mobilized. In response, the SAF issued a statement saying "There is a possibility of a confrontation between SAF and RSF forces" introducing fears of a wider conflict. In the evening of 14 April 2023, RSF forces assaulted the Khartoum International Airport, a military base, and the presidential palace. The fighting spread from Khartoum into its suburbs, primarily Omdurman, where its bridge on the White Nile was largely captured by the RSF forces. On 26 March 2025, the SAF claimed victory after expelling RSF forces from most of Khartoum, including the airport and the presidential palace.

== Detention, torture and killing of civilians ==
The RSF established detention centres throughout Khartoum, repurposing residential buildings, police stations, and schools into makeshift prisons. Detainees, often civilians with no formal charges against them, were subjected to brutal conditions. Survivors reported enduring starvation, beatings, and witnessing the deaths of fellow inmates.

One notable case is that of Alwaleed Abdeen, a prominent Sudanese entrepreneur and philanthropist. Abdeen was detained by the RSF and held in a makeshift prison in Jebel Awliya for six months. During his captivity, he suffered severe torture and malnutrition. A video released shortly before his death showed him emaciated and unrecognisable, highlighting the extreme conditions detainees faced.

In March 2025, investigations by The Guardian have uncovered RSF-operated detention centres near Khartoum, where detainees faced starvation, beatings, and executions. A mass grave containing over 550 bodies was discovered, highlighting the scale of these abuses. In May 2025, a similar mass graves containing over 465 bodies was discovered by the SAF in Salha, Omdurman. The mass graves were near an RSF-operated detention centre with 648 detainees.

Tuti Island, within Khartoum, endured an 18-month siege by the RSF, leading to severe shortages of food and medical supplies for its 30,000 residents. The siege ended in October 2024 following a counter-offensive by the Sudanese army.

In September 2024, the RSF executed 7 civilians in the Salama North area of Khartoum Bahri. In April 2025, the RSF killed 31 people execution-style in Salha, Omdurman.

== Indiscriminate shelling ==
In July 2023, the RSF shelled the nearby Al-Salama area with mortar fire during their retreat, killing between six and ten civilians according to conflicting sources. During October 2023, the RSF shelling killed at least 10 people in the El Jarafa neighbourhood of Omdurman, 20 people at a clinic attached to a mosque in the Samarab neighbourhood of Khartoum Bahri, and 190 people following two days of RSF artillery shelling of SAF air defence positions on Jebel Awlia, Khartoum. The RSF shelling killed 11 in the Karari neighbourhood of Omdurman, and 3 people at the Al-Nau hospital in Omdurman

In November 2023, 12 people were killed by shelling in Karari, Omdurman. In December 2023, Five members of the same family were killed after a shell fell on their house in Omdurman, and 37 people were killed by shelling between the SAF and the RSF in the El Thawra neighborhood of northwest Omdurman.

In 2024, 4 people were killed in a drone attack on a market in Khartoum Bahri and 7 people were killed by shelling in the Al-Nahda neighborhood of Khartoum in February, 13 people were killed by suspected RSF shelling in the Hab Al-Naseem neighbourhood of Al-Jarif, Khartoum in April, 11 people were killed by RSF shelling in Omdurman in May, at least 40 people were killed and 50 were injured by RSF shelling on Omdurman, according to the Karari Resistance Committee in June, 7 people were killed by RSF shelling in Omdurman in August, and 4 people were also killed by RSF shelling in Omdurman and Karari and 15 people were killed by shelling on the Sabreen market in Omdurman in September. In October, 16 people were injured and 4 people were killed by RSF shelling in Omdurman. In November, 5 people were killed by suspected RSF shelling on a mosque in Omdurman. In December, 3 people were killed by RSF shelling in Karari, followed by at least 65 people killed by extensive RSF shelling in Karari, Omdurman after 3 days.

On 4 January 2025, 4 others were killed by RSF shelling in Omdurman, 13 January on at least 120 people were killed by shelling in western Omdurman. and on 18 January 2025, at least 3 people were killed by RSF shelling in Omdurman.

On 1 February 2025, the RSF was accused of shelling the Sabreen Market and several neighbourhoods in the Al-Thawra area in the Karary locality, north of Omdurman, west of the capital Khartoum killing 52 and injuring 156. On 19 February, 6 people were killed by RSF shelling in Omdurman. On 16 March, 4 people were killed and 30 people were injured including 18 children from RSF shelling in Karari, Omdurman. On 23 March, three others were killed by RSF shelling in Omdurman. On 24 March 2025, the RSF shelled several areas in Omdurman killing 3 poples before the next day shelling a mosque in Khartoum during Isha prayer, killing at least 5 and injuring dozens.

On 2 April 2025, at least 96 people were killed following four days of attacks on the RSF on Al-Jumu’iya, south of Omdurman.

In addition, individuals of all ages have been trapped in the crossfire during frequent attacks in densely populated civilian areas, with both sides employing explosive weaponry that affects a wide area. Actress Asia Abdelmajid, singer Shaden Gardood, former football player Fozi el-Mardi and his daughter, and Araki Abdelrahim, a member of the music group Igd al-Jalad, were killed in crossfire.

== Hospitals attacks ==
On 1 July 2023, the Sudanese Doctors Union accused the RSF of raiding the Shuhada hospital and killing a staff member. The RSF denied the accusation. On 15 July, five people were killed and 22 others were injured in a drone strike on the Aliya hospital in Omdurman blamed on the RSF. On 16 July, the RSF was accused of attacking the Aliya hospital for a second day with drones. On 20 July, an 18-member team of Médecins Sans Frontières was attacked while transporting supplies to the Turkish Hospital in south Khartoum. On 1 August, the Doctors' Hospital, northwest of Khartoum Airport, partially collapsed due to shelling, with the RSF accusing the SAF of targeting the facility in airstrikes. On 9 October, 20 people were killed by RSF shelling at a clinic attached to a mosque in the Samarab neighbourhood of Khartoum Bahri.

On 5 December 2023, a strike was called by doctors at the Bashaier Hospital in Khartoum after its medical director and another medical staff were attacked by the RSF.

On 19 June 2024, 3 people were killed by RSF shelling of the Al-Nao hospital in Karari, Omdurman. On 4 February 025, At least six people were killed by RSF shelling on the al-Nao hospital in Omdurman.

== Targeted individuals ==
Sudanese prosecutors recorded over 500 missing persons cases across the country, some of which were enforced disappearances, and were mostly blamed on the RSF. On 13 May 2023, the RSF intruded into the Mar Girgis (St George's) Coptic Church complex in Khartoum's Bahri area. They reportedly shot five clergymen and looted money and a gold cross.

Aside from the occupation of state media channels, the RSF raided the offices of the newspapers El Hirak El Siyasi, El Madaniya and the Sudanese Communist Party's El Midan and shot and injured photojournalists Faiz Abubakr and Ali Shata. On 16 June 2023, Al Jazeera journalists Osama Sayed Ahmed and Ahmed El Buseili were shot by snipers in Khartoum, while the RSF detained two of the channel's other reporters, Ahmed Fadl and Rashid Gibril, in Khartoum on 16 May, and subsequently looted Fadl's residence. On 21 March 2025, an RSF drone strike on the Republican Palace in Khartoum killed six journalists, including two military reporters and four members of a Sudan TV crew.

== Sexual violence ==
In July 2024, Human Rights Watch (HRW) released a report which stated that sexual violence in Khartoum has been "widespread." The report states that most of this violence has been committed by the RSF, but states that the SAF have also participated in crimes against humanity. The report states that countless women and girls have been raped, gang raped, forced into marriage and experienced sexual slavery. In November 2024, the UN Independent International Fact-Finding Mission reiterated similar findings to the HRW. Several cases resulted in death for the victim. In at least 4 instances, female health workers were subjected to sexual violence. While most reported cases of sexual violence have been against females, there were reports against men and boys as well.

On 3 August 2023, Amnesty International released a report detailing sexual violence against women and girls as young as 12, targeted attacks on civilian facilities such as hospitals and churches, and looting.

Doctors in Sudanese hospitals reported a drastic increase in rape reports during the battle, especially in Bahri. By June 2023, twelve incidents of sexual violence against 37 women were reported to UNHCR since the fighting began, with many of the incidents against young girls.

== Theft and looting ==
The RSF and Arab militias were said to have committed robberies. During April 2023, the RSF was reported to have looted some residential areas in Khartoum, with residents of the Khartoum 2 area telling the BBC that the RSF had been going house-to-house demanding water and food. Residents in Khartoum State expressed concerns about widespread theft and pillaging, coupled with the complete lack of police presence and law enforcement." In May and June, residents in Omdurman said that widespread looting took place at the Libyan Souq, while the Somali embassy in Khartoum was ransacked and looted by RSF fighters.

On 17 September 2023, the SAF accused the RSF of setting fire to the Greater Nile Petroleum Oil Company Tower, as well as looting and burning the Khartoum Sahel and Sahara Bank tower.

== Reaction ==
The United Nations and various human rights organisations have condemned these actions, labelling them as potential war crimes. Reports indicate that the RSF's tactics in Khartoum were part of a broader strategy of terrorising the civilian population, aiming to suppress dissent and control the city through fear.

On 3 August 2023, Amnesty International released its report on the conflict. Titled Death Came To Our Home: War Crimes and Civilian Suffering In Sudan, it documented "mass civilian casualties in both deliberate and indiscriminate attacks" by both the SAF and the RSF, particularly in Khartoum and West Darfur. It also detailed sexual violence against women and girls as young as 12, targeted attacks on civilian facilities such as hospitals and churches, and looting.
