= 2025 Omdurman market attack =

War crime in Sudan in 2025

- Part of Battle of Khartoum and RSF atrocities in Khartoum
- Location: Omdurman, Khartoum State, Sudan
- Date: 1 February 2025
- Deaths: 56
- Injuries: 158
- Perpetrator: Rapid Support Forces

On 1 February 2025, 56 people were killed and 158 more wounded after massive amounts of shelling allegedly perpetrated by the Rapid Support Forces (RSF) affected a market in Khartoum's twin city of Omdurman.

== Prelude ==
The War in Sudan began on 15 April 2023, after the paramilitary Rapid Support Forces attempted to overthrow the Sudanese government led by Abdel Fattah al-Burhan. The coup attempt plunged the Sudanese capital Khartoum and its two sister cities, Omdurman and Bahri, into grueling urban warfare.

In December 2024, the Office of the United Nations High Commissioner for Human Rights stated that: "On 9 December, it is reported that airstrikes by the Sudanese Armed Forces on a market in Kabkabiya town in North Darfur killed at least 42 civilians and injured many others. The next day, artillery shelling attributed to the Rapid Support Forces struck Sabrin market and a bus station in the densely populated Krari neighbourhood of Omdurman, the sister city of Khartoum. At least 22 civilians were killed at the bus station, and more than 25 injured. An unspecified number of civilians were killed in the shelling of Sabrin market." They also pointed out that "Markets have frequently come under attack by both parties since the conflict began in April 2023".

Around the end of December 2024 to January 2025, the Sudanese Armed Forces had begun launching offensives to capture territory in and out of the capital of Khartoum. With major victories by the national army being announced, especially in the capital's twin cities. A day before the attacks on the market, RSF commander and leader Hemedti vowed to retake the capital from the SAF.

== Attack ==
The Rapid Support Forces allegedly shelled the Sabrin market and a number of neighborhoods in the Al-Thawra area in the Karari locality, north of Omdurman, west of the capital Khartoum. As a result, 52 civilians were confirmed and reported killed and dozens injured (56 in total after posterior reports). Right after the attacks occurred, Khartoum State Governor Ahmed Osman Hamza reported these figures.

Evidence towards the happenings came after medical sources announced the attacks, as several wounded civilians were brought to nearby hospitals in order to be taken care for.

== Response ==
- Rapid Support Forces: The RSF denied responsibility for the attack, saying that they did not target any populated areas in Omdurman, and denied any connection to the bombing of the Sabrin market, while claiming that all artillery shells on the Al-Thawrat area were launched from military platforms of the army and its militias "With the aim of covering up their crimes."
- United Nations: The United Nations' Resident and Humanitarian Coordinator in Sudan, Clementine Nkweta-Salami condemned the strike on the Sabrin market, attacks on several residential neighbourhoods in Omdurman.

== See also ==
- List of massacres in Sudan
- 2025 Saudi Hospital Attack
- October 2024 Sudan airstrikes
- Kabkabiya market airstrike
- May 2023 Mayo shelling
