= Bodour Osman Abu Affan =

Sudanese economist and women's rights activist

Bodour Osman Abu Affan (c.1942 – 2010) was a Sudanese development economist and women's rights activist.

== Life ==
Bodour Osman Abu Affan was born into an affluent Wad Medani family, and educated at Omdurman High School for Girls. After marrying Fareed Atabani, another economist, she studied for her master's degree at the American University in Washington, D.C., while bringing up their two children. She spent a year at the University of California, Berkeley before gaining her PhD from the University of Khartoum in 1984.

She became director of the Social and Economic Research Council in Khartoum and was the first female vice-president of the African Development Bank in Abidjan, Ivory Coast. Together with Raja Hassan Khalifa, she led the campaign of the National Union of Sudanese Women to secure 25% of the seats for women in the next parliament.

She died of cancer aged 67 in 2010.

== Works ==
- The impact of direct private foreign investment on the future development of the Sudan economy, 1980
- Industrial policies and industrialization in the Sudan, 1985
- Traffic and public transport in metropolitan Khartoum : problems and possibilities, 1985
