= Hussein Suleiman Abu Saleh =

Sudanese politician (1930–2021)

Hussein Saleh

Minister of Foreign Affairs
- In office 1 May 1993 – 9 February 1995
- Preceded by: Husein Saleh
- Succeeded by: Husein saleh Mohammed Taha
- In office 15 May 1988 – 31 December 1988
- Preceded by: Mamoun Mahgoub Sinada
- Succeeded by: Hassan al-Turabi

Personal details
- Born: 5 October 1930 Omdurman, Sudan
- Died: 6 December 2021 (aged 91) Khartoum, Sudan
- Party: DUP; Nile Valley Congress

Hussein Suleiman Abusalih (Arabic: حسين سليمان أبو صالح; 5 October 1930 – 6 December 2021) was a Sudanese politician and neurosurgeon. He served as Minister of Foreign Affairs from 15 May 1988, to 31 December 1988, and again from 13 February 1993, to 9 February 1995.
