= Nasra bint ʿAdlan =

Sudanese noblewoman and member of the Funj royal house

- Born: 1800; Sennar
- Died: 1852 to 1860
- Citizenship: Sudan
- Occupation: Estate manager
- Mother: Princess of Funj royal house

Nasra bint ʿAdlan (Arabic: نصرة بنت عدلان; fl.1800s – 1850s) was a Funj noblewoman, power-broker, estate manager and enslaver, whose court was visited by Karl Richard Lepsius.

== Biography ==
Bint 'Adlan was born in the early 1800s, in or close to Sennar. Her mother was a princess of the Funj royal house; her father Muhammed 'Adlan descended from Muhammad Abu Likaylik, and rose to power in 1808. In 1821 her father was assassinated by dissidents before he could launch resistance against the Turkish conquest of the Funj state.

Her first husband was a merchant called Muhammad Sandaluba. They had a daughter named Dawwa and divided their time between Sennar and their estate at Maranjan, near Wad Madani. After the death of Sandaluba, bint 'Adlan remarried, this time to Daf ʿ Allah Muhammad, who was a district governor at Wad Madani. In the 1830s they built a palace and a village called Suriba, which served it. During this time the couple became more involved in commercial ventures, which included agriculture and prostitution, both of which were based on slave labour.

As the manager of her own estates, and connected to high-ranking officials through her family and wealth, bint 'Adlan was an influential woman in the region. She supported Nasir wad Abakr to bid for the throne of Taqali.

She died between 1852 and 1860; after her death the Suriba palace became a ruin. The archaeologist Karl Richard Lepsius had visited bint 'Adlan and an account of her life was published in 1853 in his work Letters from Egypt, Ethiopia, and the Peninsula of Sinai.
