= Mohi El-Din Salem =

Sudanese politician

- محي الدين سالم

Minister of Foreign Affairs
- Incumbent
- Assumed office 12 September 2025
- Prime Minister: Kamil Idris
- Preceded by: Omar Mohammed Ahmed Siddiq

Personal details
- Born: Mohi El-Din Salem Ahmed Ibrahim; 1 January 1957 (age 69)
- Party: Independent
- Education: University of Khartoum (LLB); Institute for Diplomatic Studies, Cairo

Mohi El-Din Salem Ahmed Ibrahim (Arabic: محي الدين سالم أحمد إبراهيم; born 1 January 1957), also transliterated as Mohieldin Salim Ahmed Ibrahim and Muhi al-Din Salem Ahmed Ibrahim, is a Sudanese diplomat and politician.

== Career ==
Mohi El-Din Salem completed a bachelor of laws at the University of Khartoum in 1979, and was called to the bar in 1982. He obtained a diploma from the Institute for Diplomatic Studies in Cairo the following year.

El-Din Salem joined the Ministry of Foreign Affairs in 1980. His diplomatic postings include serving as Sudan's ambassador to the United Arab Emirates (1999–2004), to Ethiopia and the African Union (2007–2011), and to Kuwait (2015–2019). He was appointed minister of foreign affairs in September 2025, and has played a key role in attempting to end the Sudanese civil war.
