= Omar Mohammed Ahmed Siddiq =

Sudanese politician

Minister of Foreign Affairs
- In office 30 April 2025 – 10 September 2025
- Preceded by: Hussein Al-Amin
- Succeeded by: Mohi El-Din Salem

Personal details
- Party: Independent

Omar Mohammed Ahmed Siddiq is a Sudanese politician who served as the Minister of Foreign Affairs between 30 April 2025 and 10 September 2025. He was previously ambassador to Switzerland, Germany and Britain. In 2019, he was appointed permanent representative to the United Nations.
