= Mubarak Zarouk =

Sudanese politician and minister

Minister of Foreign Affairs
- In office 1956–1956
- Preceded by: office established
- Succeeded by: Muhammad Ahmad Mahgoub

Personal details
- Born: Mubarak Zarouk; 4 April 1916 Tokar, Sudan
- Died: 26 April 1965 (aged 49) Khartoum, Sudan

Mubarak Zarouk (4 April 1916 in Tokar – 26 April 1965 in Khartoum) was a Sudanese statesman who served as Minister of Foreign Affairs of Sudan in 1956.
