= Ibrahim al Kashif =

Sudanese popular musician

Ibrahim al Kashif (Arabic: إبراهيم الكاشف, born 1915 in Wad Madani, Sudan, died in September 1969) was one of the most popular and influential Sudanese singers between the end of World War II and the independence of Sudan in 1956. His innovative style developed out of Haqeebah Music, and he added a string section as well as other Western musical instruments to the traditional Sudanese percussion or Arabic oud. Because of these innovations and his choice of poetic or patriotic lyrics, he was later dubbed the "Father of modern Singing in Sudan".

== Musical style ==
According to an article in Middle East Eye online magazine, Ibrahim al Kashif's song Write to Me Darling is set to the lyrics of the poem Letters, written by Sudanese poet Abed Abdel Rahman. After a long instrumental introduction of string instruments, percussion, oud and Western instruments like the flute, al Kashif sings about the narrator and his beloved, who had drifted apart:

My beloved and I were separated after years of companionship.

Distance chose to come between them and me

The nights of the past, oh God bless you

Remember sitting atop hills

Whispering the whispers of youth while we were in the dawn of youth

I'll write to you, so write to me

The one who remains the love of my life

Remember my affection, Cherish our connection

== Ongoing popularity of al Kashif's songs ==
In 2018, al Kashif's song Elhabeeb ween (Where is my sweetheart?) was reissued on the CD compilation Two Niles to Sing a Melody: The Violins and Synths of Sudan.

During the Sudanese Revolution of 2018/19, his song Land of Good - I am African, I am Sudanese was played in the streets of Khartoum. On 11 April 2020, one year to the day after the Sudanese people filled the streets at the military headquarters in the heart of the capital Khartoum to celebrate the downfall of dictator Omar el Bashir, three Sudanese rap musicians published their remake of Ana Afriki, Ana Sudani (I'm African, I'm Sudanese), bearing witness to the ongoing popularity of al Kashif's patriotic song.

== See also ==
- Music of Sudan
