= Omer Ismail =

Sudanese humanitarian

- Born: Dafur
- Citizenship: Sundan
- Education: Khartoum University
- Occupation(s): Humanitarianist, Activist

Omer Gamar-Eldin Ismail (Arabic: عمر قمر الدين إسماعيل) is the Prime Minister's Advisor for Global Partnerships and former Acting Minister of Foreign Affairs in Sudan. He took on this position in the Cabinet reshuffle of July 2020.

== Early life and education ==
Omer was born in the Darfur region of Sudan. After graduating from Khartoum University, he worked as research assistant to Dr. Mansour Khalid, former Sudanese Minister of Foreign Affairs.

== Career ==
After fleeing Sudan, he worked for the United Nations in Somalia between 1992 and 1994. Returning to Washington, D.C., he helped found the Sudan Democratic Forum, a think tank of Sudanese intellectuals working for the advancement of democracy in Sudan, as well as co-founding the Darfur Peace and Development Organization to raise awareness about the crisis in his troubled region.

Before joining the transitional Sudanese government, Ismail was a humanitarian worker and activist working to publicize conditions in Darfur. He was forced to flee Sudan in 1989 after the National Islamic Front took power in 1989. He subsequently worked for the United Nations, and was a policy fellow in the Carr Centre for Human Rights Policy at Harvard Kennedy School at Harvard University from 2006 to 2007. He would also earn a MPA from Harvard.

== Humanitarian Activity ==
During his time as Acting Minister of Foreign Affairs, Ismail met with Swiss officials in Bern and convinced them to donate CHF 1 million (USD $1.09 million) through the United Nations' Sudan Humanitarian Fund after the country was hit with violent floods and a three-month state of emergency was declared.
