= Muhammad Taha Al-Qaddal =

Sudanese poet (1951–2021)

- Born: محمد طه القدّال; December 12, 1951 village of Helweh, Gezira State
- Died: July 4, 2021 (aged 69); Doha, Qatar
- Other names: Muhammad Al-Gaddal
- Occupation: poet

Muhammad Taha Al-Qaddal, also transcribed as Muhammad Al-Gaddal (Arabic: محمد طه القدّال, Sudanese Arabic pronunciation: muˈħammad ˈtˤɑhɑ al gaddɑːl; 12 December 1951 – 4 July 2021), was a Sudanese poet. Al-Qaddal began his literary career in the late 1960s; he wrote contemporary Arabic lyric poetry and became known in the early 1980s for expressing socio-political messages through his verses. Some of his poems were put to music by some Sudanese singers. His poetry was about the suffering of Sudanese during the late 1990s Islamist military government period.

== Life and career ==
Al-Qaddal was born on December 12, 1951, in the village of Helweh, Gezira State. He first studied medicine but later graduated in Management from the University of Khartoum. At the beginning of his professional life, he worked for Sudan National Television and later as a cultural manager for the DAL cultural forum in Khartoum. At the same time, he devoted his time to writing and publicly reciting poetry.

Al-Qaddal was known for his spoken-word poetry and for his performances, where he recited the history and traditions of Sudanese culture. Some of his poems were put to music by popular singers such as Mostafa Sid Ahmed and the musical group Igd al-Jalad. According to Sudanese literary critic Lemya Shammat,

This won him a prominent seat among Sudanese poets, especially those who write in the Sudanese dialect and have enthralling oral poetic performances, such as Mahjoub Sharif, Himmaid, and Azhari. Al-Gaddal went on to make an enormous contribution to Sudanese poetry, helping shape a poetic tradition that keenly digs into the challenges and sufferings of everyday life and gives voice to the neglected, disadvantaged, and downtrodden.

In an article for ArabLit magazine, Sudanese translator and literary critic Adil Babikir discussed Al-Qaddal's modern version of the Bedouin-style musdar, "a long poem that describes the poet’s journey to his beloved". Babikir further commented on Al-Qaddal "for his trailblazing role in taking traditional Bedouin poetry to new levels and establishing it firmly as a medium for addressing the themes of modern life."

Al-Qaddal died on July 4, 2021, at the age of seventy from symptoms of cancer in Al-Amal Hospital in Doha, Qatar.

== Legacy ==
On 22 October 2021, the 16th Khartoum International Book Fair was launched, but came to a premature end a few days later, due to the October 2021 Sudanese coup d'etat. The organisers had prepared a commemoration of Al-Qaddal's work "for his influential poetic mastery, startling images, wordsmithery, and verbal elegance."

== See also ==
- Sudanese literature
- Arabic literature
- List of Sudanese writers
