= October 2024 Sudan airstrikes =

War crimes in Sudan

- Part of War crimes during the Sudanese civil war (2023–present)
- Location: White Nile State, North Darfur, North Kordofan, and Gezira State, Sudan
- Date: 4 October 2024 – ongoing
- Target: Areas held by Rapid Support Forces
- Attack type: Airstrike
- Deaths: >523 civilians
- Injuries: ~340 civilians
- Perpetrator: Sudanese Air Force

A series of air strikes are being conducted by the Sudanese Armed Forces (SAF) against positions of the Rapid Support Forces (RSF) across Sudan, resulting in a significant increase in the number of civilian deaths in the war. Civilian areas and RSF-held positions have been targeted by the SAF in North Darfur, North Kordofan, Gezira State, and White Nile State, resulting in an estimated death toll of 523 Sudanese civilians.

== Airstrikes ==
On 10 October, multiple Sudanese responders and human rights activists reported that large numbers of civilians had been killed by airstrikes conducted across Sudan by the Sudanese Armed Forces (SAF), noting their significant escalation compared to prior stages of the war. The Sudanese human rights organization Emergency Lawyers stated that hundreds of people had been killed by the SAF and that it represented the army's "indifference to protecting defenseless civilians".

The Yale Humanitarian Lab analyzed that new offensives conducted by the SAF against besieged RSF positions in al-Fashir, North Darfur, Khartoum, and other locations were the cause of the increased airstrikes. In addition, the end of seasonal rainfall was predicted to allow the further escalation of offensives.

=== Course of airstrikes ===
On 4 October, UNICEF reported that at least 65 people, including 13 children, were killed and more than 200 others were injured in SAF airstrikes on the town market of El Koma, North Darfur, leading to the entire market burning down. In addition, several health centers and water sources were damaged or destroyed by the bombings. Airstrikes were also conducted on Mellit to the north of El Koma, killing 23 people.

On 5 October, at least 30 people were killed and more than 100 others were injured in SAF airstrikes on Hamra al-Sheikh and Abu Zuama in North Kordofan. SAF military aircraft dropped about six bombs on Hamra al-Sheikh's main market and on several residential neighborhoods, which local sources claimed did not contain any RSF presence.

On 6 October, the SAF conducted airstrikes on Selea, the capital of Jebel Moon town. Local sources stated that they were unable to count the victims and determine the scope of damages caused due to complete outages of communications and lack of available Starlink satellite internet terminals.

On 7 October, more than 100 people were killed or wounded in SAF airstrikes on the Fur Market in Hasaheisa, Gezira State, including children.

== Responses ==
Rapid Support Forces leader Hemedti accused the Egyptian government of involvement in the airstrikes by using United States-sent bombs to target positions near Jebel Moya, located the south of Khartoum. The Egyptian Ministry of Foreign Affairs denied the allegations, and called upon the international community to investigate the claims made by the RSF leader. Hemedti also claimed that there were Tigrayan, Eritrean, Azerbaijani and Ukrainian mercenaries participating in the conflict.

The Sudanese Armed Forces accused the RSF of forcefully occupying civilian homes, using civilians as human shields, and conducing attacks from civilian spaces. The RSF denied the use of human shields.

The Emergency Lawyers organization called the airstrikes war crimes that represented a scandal upon the international community. UNICEF Representative to Sudan Sheldon Yett called the attacks on children "unacceptable".

== See also ==
- Wad An Nora massacre
- Kutum Hospital airstrike
- 2009 Sudan airstrikes
- 2024 eastern Gezira State massacres
- 2025 Saudi Hospital Attack
