= Ali Al-Sadiq Ali =

Sudanese politician

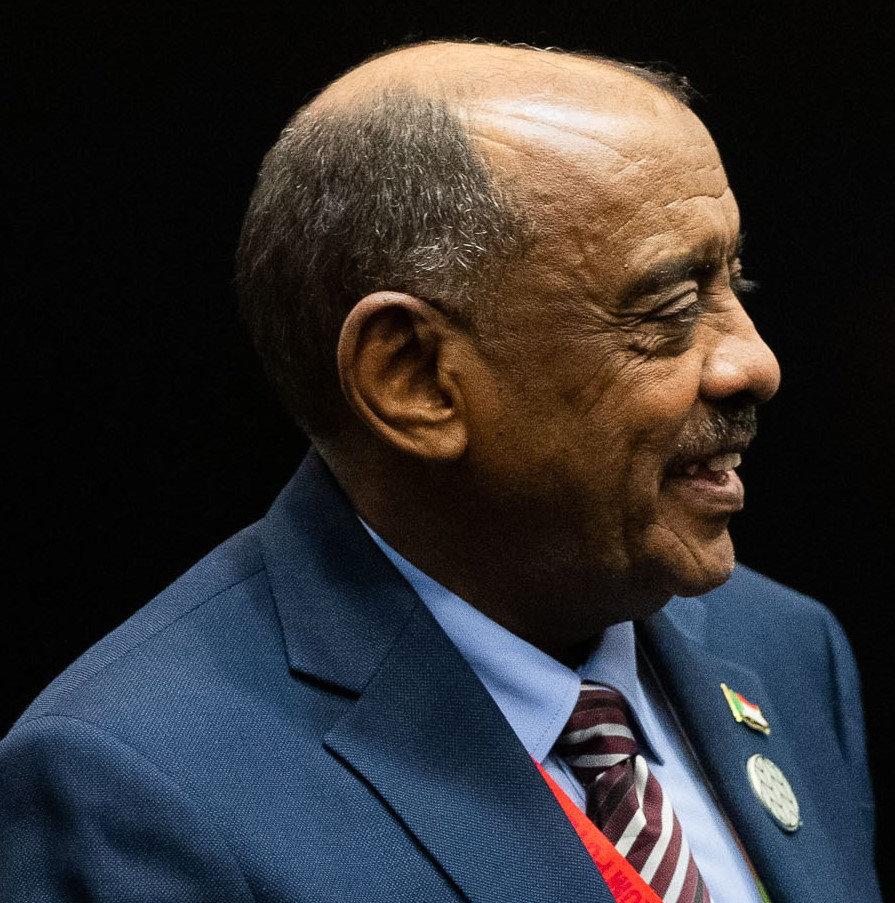
- Ali Al-Sadiq Ali in 2023

Minister of Foreign Affairs
- In office 19 January 2022 – 17 April 2024
- Preceded by: Mariam al-Mahdi
- Succeeded by: Hussein Awad Ali

Ali Al-Sadiq Ali (Arabic: علي الصادق علي) is a Sudanese politician who acted as the Minister of Foreign Affairs from 19 January 2022 to 17 April 2024.
