= Jebel Moya =

Archaeological site in Sudan

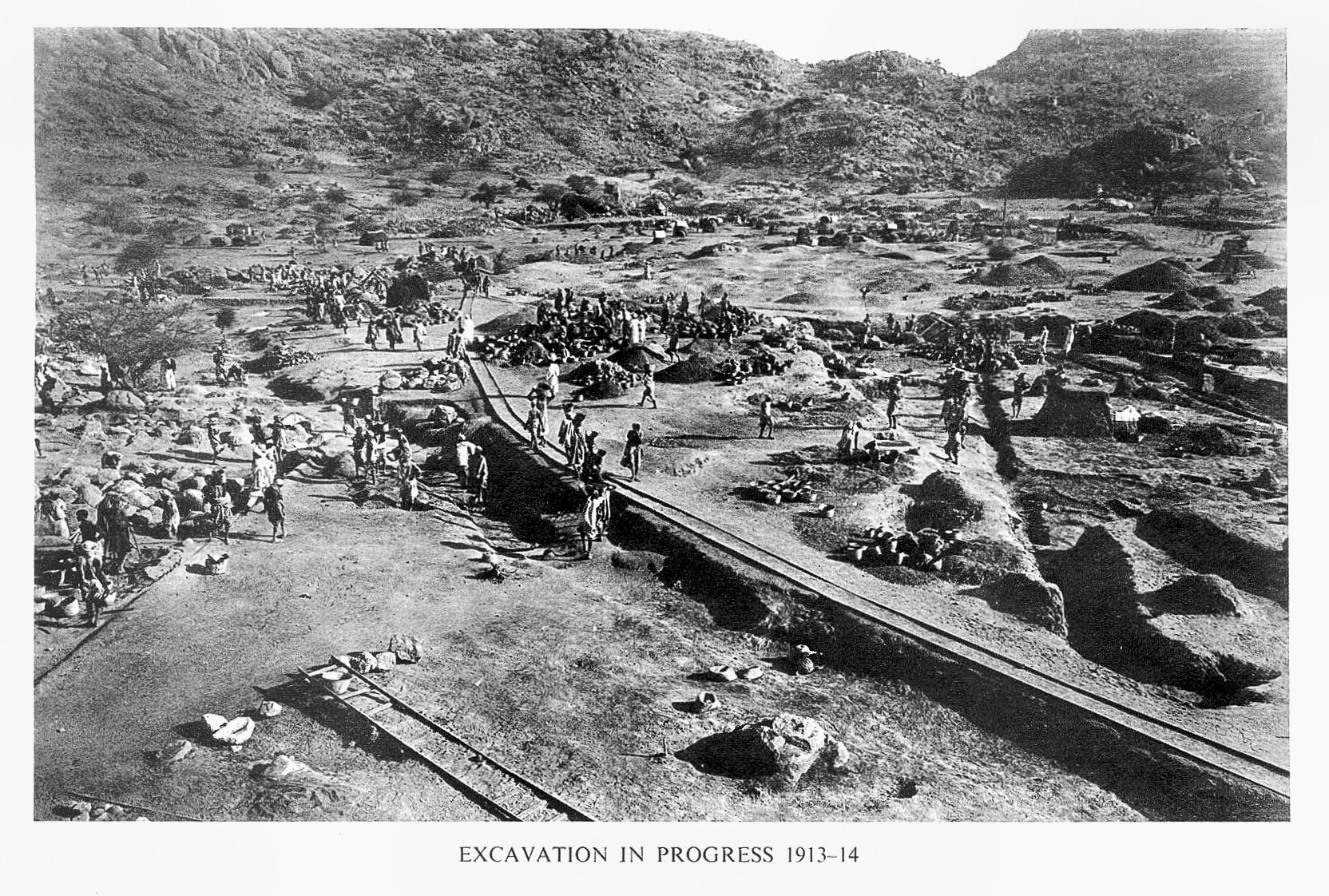
- Wellcome's excavations at Jebel Moya, 1911–1914

- Location in Sudan
- 13.5°N 33.333333°E
- Location: Sudan

Site notes
- Archaeologists: Sir Henry Wellcome

Jebel Moya is an archaeological site in the southern Gezira Plain, Sudan, approximately 250 km (150 miles) south southeast of Khartoum. Dating between 5000 BCE-500 CE and roughly 104,000 m^{2} (25 acres) in area, the site is one of the largest pastoralist cemeteries in Africa with over 3,000 burials excavated thus far. The site was first excavated by Sir Henry Wellcome from 1911 to 1914. Artifacts found at the site suggest trade routes between Jebel Moya and its surrounding areas, even as far as Egypt.

== Environment ==
The Gezira Plain is a megafan created by the Blue Nile. Present day flood levels were in place by 3500 BCE, as the area transitioned from swampy conditions to a savanna as the Inter Tropical Convergence Zone moved south. The environmental transition from swamp to savanna and semi-desert steppe was complete by 3000 BCE. By the early centuries CE, few swampy conditions remained; one notable wet site that remained is Jebel et Tomat, another early pastoralist site, northeast of Jebel Moya.

Environmentally, the Southern Gezira can be separated into categories of swamp vegetation, riverine woodland, grassland, and jebel vegetation. This places the environment of Jebel Moya close to transitional belts, in both modern day, and likely the Classic and Meroitic periods.

Jebel Moya refers to a massif which includes a group of granite hills connected by ridges and valleys; the name has become associated with the archaeological site within the north-easternmost of these valleys. The Jebel Moya massif is a geological granite outcrop of the Gezira Plain's underlying Basement Complex, which breaks through the above Sandstone Formation. The Basement Complex contains an underground aquifer, which results in fresh water rising to the surface/ground level around outcrops like Jebel Moya.

This established Jebel Moya as a potential fresh water source, which is important in a plain without permanent surface water sources for maintaining animal herds. The aquifer is replenished by both the Blue and While Niles. This establishes that the ecological conditions in the region were suitable for pastoralism from 1000 BCE-1000 CE.

== Excavation history ==
Excavations at Jebel Moya began 29 January 1911 and continued until April 1914 when further plans were abandoned due to the onset of World War I. During those four seasons, approximately a fifth of the 10.4 hectare (25 acre) site was excavated. 2883 graves were reported during the excavation, and 2792 of the graves were cleared, the rest remained undisturbed. Some graves, devoid of burials, contained only pottery; others contained multiple inhumations. 25 of the graves contained animal burials. In total, 3137 individuals were excavated, which marks Jebel Moya as the largest burial complex yet found in sub-Saharan Africa.

=== Season 1 ===
Wellcome supervised the first field season, from 29 January - April 1911. An unrecorded number of graves were excavated during the first field season, but it was evidently enough for Wellcome to apply and receive a concessions license.

=== Season 2 ===
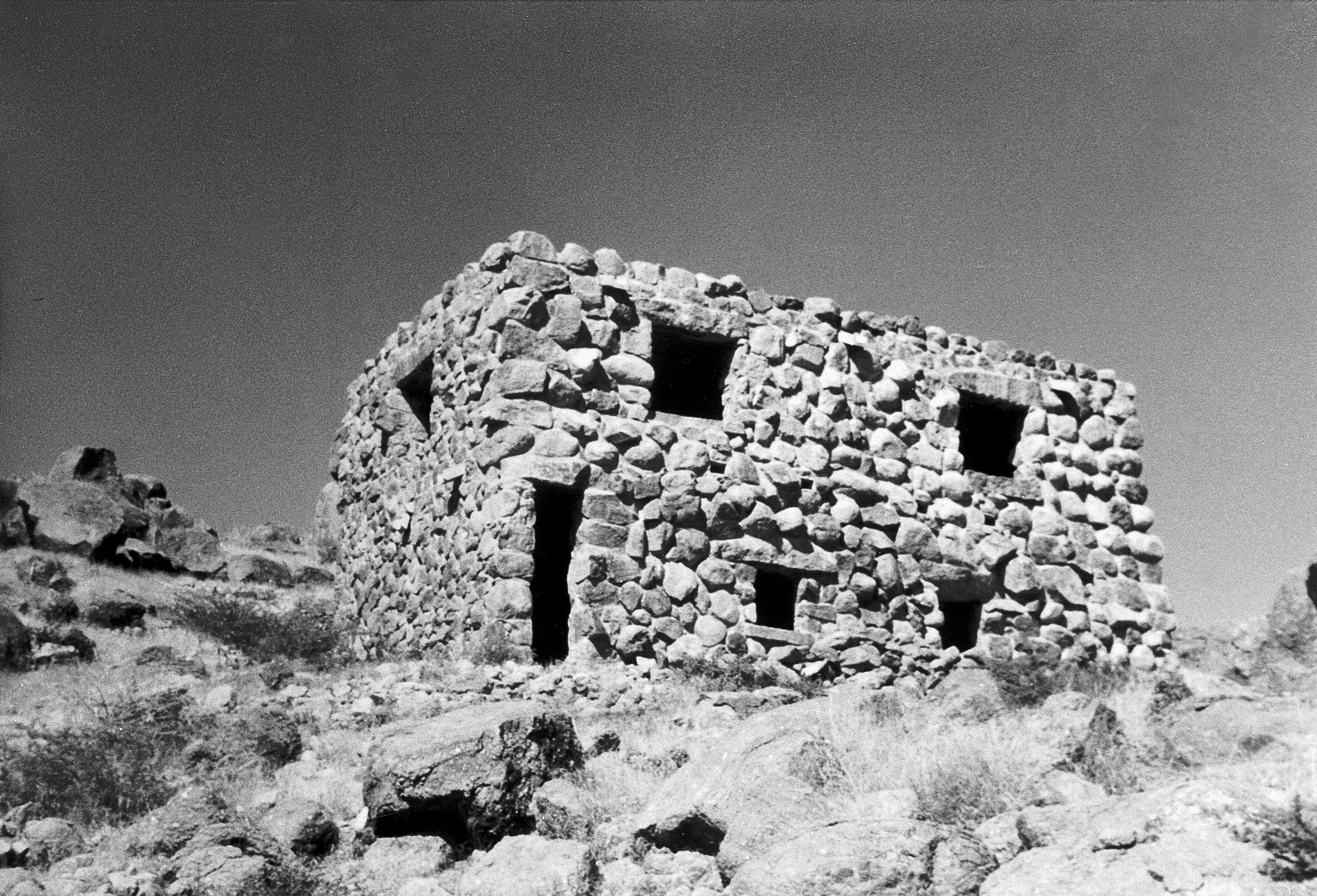
House of Boulders, Jebel Moya (Wellcome Collection)

Wellcome appointed Oric Bates as field director for the second field season (December 1911- April 1912). He also appointed Douglas Derry as the first chief medical officer and field bioanthropologist. A total of 709 graves were excavated in the East and South Jebel sectors. During the second season, construction began on the “House of Boulders”, designed to absorb laborers not required for excavation work; they worked to erect workshops and iron shed stores.

=== Season 3 ===
Field directorship was handed to James Dixon and G.A. Wainwright for the third field season, from November 1912 - April 1913, assisted by M.B. Ray and L. Dudley Buxton, who replaced Derry. A total of 310 graves were excavated in the Southwest, West, South and Northeast, but not East, sectors during the third season.

=== Season 4 ===
The final season, from Nov 1913 - April 1914, yielded 1772 graves. The onset of the first World War disrupted any plans for future seasons. Work did not resume after the war ended, and Wellcome died in 1936.

=== Post-excavation ===
Due to a variety of setbacks, including two world wars and Wellcome's death in 1936, the first official report on Jebel Moya was not published until 1949 by Frank Addison, who was appointed by the Wellcome Trust. The Trustees of the Wellcome Trust also appointed G.M. Morant, assisted by Otto Samson, to examine the remains from Jebel Moya. Unable to continue after the Second World War, the project to complete osteological work was transferred to J.C. Trevor, who employed R. Mukherjee and C.R. Rao to conduct the majority of analyses. They published their analysis in 1955.

During the 41 years in between excavating and the 1955 study re-examining the remains from Jebel Moya, a significant amount of material was lost due to poor storage conditions. Materials from Jebel Moya had been shipped to a depot in Maryleborne, and a warehouse in Dartford, London. The Dartford warehouse flooded in 1928; surviving materials, along with the Maryleborne materials, were shipped to Stamore in Middlesex, where Addison and his assistant L. P. Kirwan began their work, in 1937. During this time, undecorated pottery sherds were discarded as waste, as they were (falsely) considered to lack any diagnostic properties.

Out of the 3000-plus skeletons excavated, 98 crania and 139 mandibles, as well as a small number of other post cranial bones, survived. However, the original field cards for all of the skeletons remained. Unfortunately, only 326 of the 2903 field cards contained complete information of observations and measurements made on site during the excavation. Only 25% of the cards contained accurate or useful information. Like the skeletal remains, only a small number of excavated artifacts survived their time in storage.

Despite the setbacks caused by these conditions, the 1955 report was groundbreaking for its use of the now common Mahalanobis D2 distance to craniometric data; according to the Mukherjee, “The result was a measure of group divergence between Jebel Moya and 19 other African samples.”

== Dates ==
=== Frank Addison's dating ===
Due to errors with stratigraphic information from the original excavations, Addison's original dating (1000-400 BCE) for occupation and use of the site was inaccurate. He later modified the dates to between 400 BCE-400 CE, coinciding with the Meroitic kingdom to the north.

=== Rudolf Gerharz' dating ===
In 1994, Rudolf Gerharz’ reinterpretation of the dating of Jebel Moya, based on Addison's data, included three more accurate time phases for the site. Phase I (5000 BCE) included occasional occupations at the site, and Dotted Wavy Line pottery. Phase II (3000-800 BCE) included the majority of the graves at Jebel Moya, including burials in the western half, and many unspecified burials with no or few associated funerary objects from the eastern half. Phase III (800-100 BCE) is potentially the first to feature trade items from the north, particularly metals, ceramics and glass. Phase III encompassed the remainder of the graves in the eastern half of Jebel Moya. Gerharz’ estimates for the second and third phases were incorrect; the absence of Meroitic wheel-made pottery at Jebel Moya does not indicate the site's abandonment by 100 BCE, given the appearance of locally manufactured wheel made pottery.

=== Current dating ===
Current hypotheses posit that a network of craft communities allowed the spread of ideas and animals into central/south-central Sudan between 6000 and 5000 BCE.

All surviving site features, including graves, date in Phase II (ca. 3000-800 BCE) and Phase III (800-100 BCE). The main occupation at Jebel Moya is dated to 2300 BCE. The first conclusive evidence for burials at Jebel Moya dates to the mid-first century BCE.

Period 1, following Gerharz' Phase I, dates to the late sixth or early fifth millennium BCE. Period 2 dates between 2500 and 1500 BCE. It is inferred from surrounding economies to the north that during this period, the inhabitants of Jebel Moya were pastoral or agro-pastoral. Period 3 dates between 100 BCE and 500 CE, during which the majority of the burials were interred. Accelerator Mass Spectrometry dating of bone samples from Jebel Moya were unsuccessful due to lack of collagen. OSL dating of pottery is the first absolute date from Jebel Moya.

== Habitation ==
Because of the permanent source of water, there were multiple habitation sites as well as grave sites at Jebel Moya used by pastoralists in the area.

During the Wellcome Excavations, evidence of habitation sites were found. Most field notes concerning the habitation sites did not survive. Human-made features at Jebel Moya include three hearths, three hardened mud floors, one of which contained post-holes, and a second contained a hearth. These finds are consistent with habitation activity and possibly contemporary with Phase I (5000 BCE). Located above these works were three ovens, as well as post-holes. Mud plaster was found in one of the strata, and a patch of burnt clay flooring in another. These findings support the theory of habitations remaining through all three phases of occupation.

During the second field season, a series of stone structures were found and recorded by Oric Bates. On 20 January 1912, a series of small stone structures in the East sector of the cemetery were recorded. On 24 January 1912, a seventh semi-circular stone 7 meters (23') in length was found 30 cm (1') below surface level. Bates believed the structures, composed of small stones, were not associated with any specific burial, and were perhaps parts of shelters, or stone platforms for sacrificing or feasting. Nineteen ovens were found in the Southwest sector of Jebel Moya. The ovens were barrel shaped pits plastered in mud, 40–50 cm (16" to 20") in depth, 70–80 cm (28" to 32") in diameter. The oven pits contained burnt animal bones, stones, pottery sherds, and fragments of querns. Addison posited that the stones were heated in an external area and then placed in the oven, with food placed over it, to slowly cook.

The available data suggests that settlement at Jebel Moya during Phase I was likely episodic. The lack of data from the rest of the valley prevents a concrete answer pertaining to the potentiality of a permanent settlement or a seasonal one during Phase II. The presence of ovens, co-occurring with mortuary activity, suggests that the site was permanently occupied during Phase III.

== Mortuary complex ==
=== Depth and orientation ===
The depth of the site from the highest point on the ground surface to the lowest point on bedrock was 2.8 meters (9'3"). 36 of the burials were crouched, 217 of the burials were prone, and 1695 burials were supine, with 355 on their left side, and 430 on their right side. The majority of the burials were facing somewhat north or west.

=== Burials ===
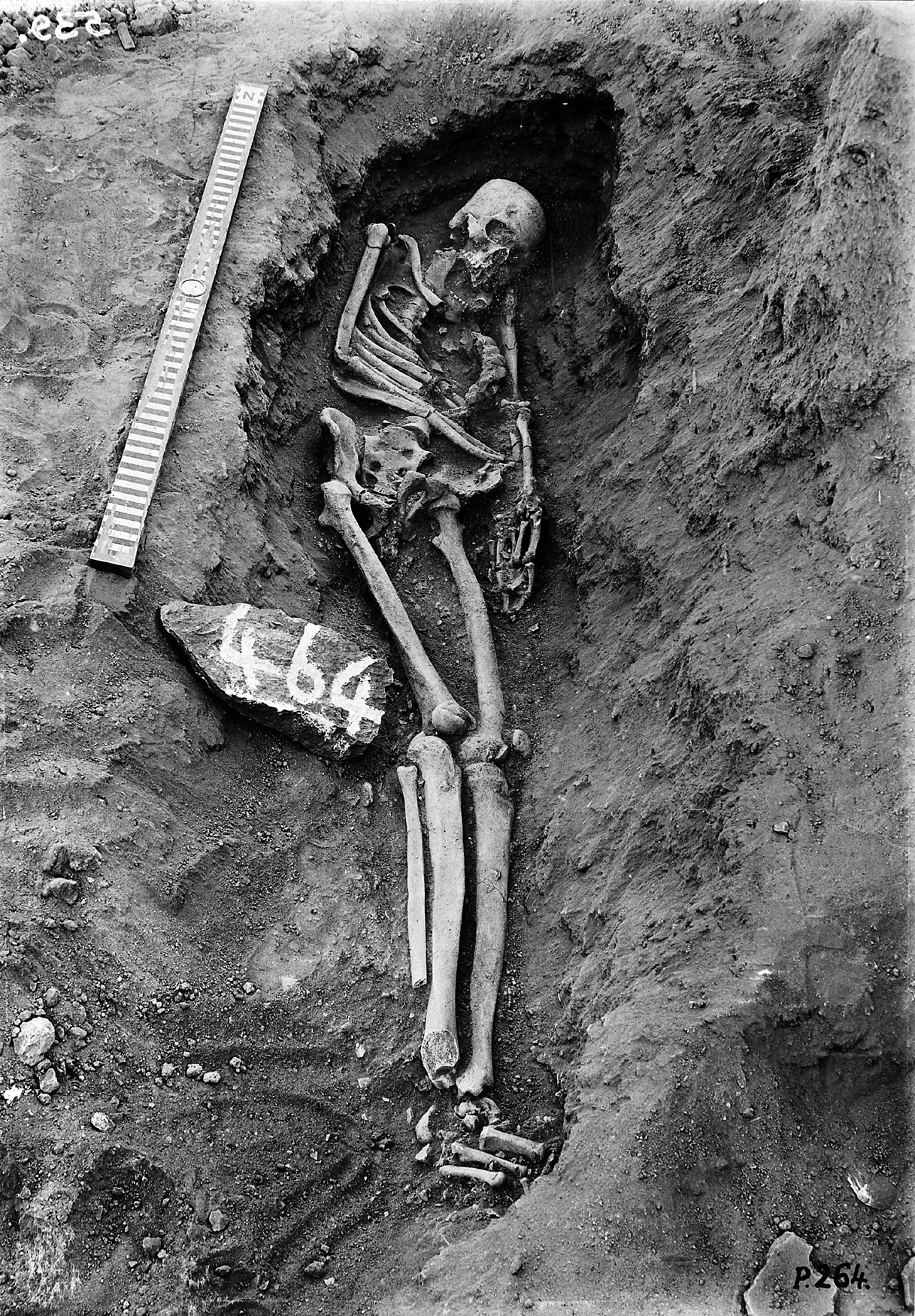
Skeleton in Situ (Wellcome Collection)

All ages and sexes were represented in the burials at Jebel Moya. 2026 burials (64.7%) were buried without funerary objects; many had only a small number. According to Addison's report, “There was little evidence of a standard mortuary practice; tomb types differed in appearance, body position varied widely, and graves ‘were oriented to every point of the compass." In addition to human burials, 55 occurrences of cattle bones were found, either as individual cattle burials, or in association with a human burial. Several cattle figurines made of clay were also excavated, though none were associated with the graves or burials.

There is little evidence of a standard burial practice. Tomb types, body positions, and orientations often differed. 24 burials are associated with pottery; sixteen are from whole or mostly whole vessels, four are “pot bursts” where sherds cover a portion of the body, and seven have loose pottery sherds. They are all from Assemblage 3(100 BCE-500 CE). Graves at Jebel Moya were either round pits, oval graves, or graves of indeterminate shape. No permanent grave markings appear, or at least none have survived. There is a strong uniformity in number and type of burial assemblages; a high level of androgyny, at least in a mortuary realm.

==== Infant burials ====
There are 93 infant burials at Jebel Moya, 35 of which have associated grave foods. The largest percentage of oval burials occurs for infant burials (16.13%). They are not distinguishable from other burials in terms of orientation and burial type, and do not form a distinct area on the cemetery. There are no artifacts exclusively seen in infant burials, but the burials seem to have a restricted range of goods: beads, bracelets, pendants, and lipstuds.

==== Juvenile burials ====
There are 199 juvenile burials at Jebel Moya, 67 of which have associated funerary objects. Like the infants, there are no exclusive categories for juveniles, however, a wider array of artifacts were found with juveniles than infants. Grave shapes are similar to that of adults. Juvenile burials were not distinguished from adult burials in terms of bodily orientation, burial posture, or burial location within the cemetery.

==== Young adults ====
Young adults had no categories exclusive to them. A wide variety of artifacts were found in association with burials. They were buried similarly to adults.

==== Adults ====
Adults graves far outnumbered the previous categories, totaling 2421, 880 of which have associated assemblages. Adults were buried with the greatest quantity of material items. There is no strong depositional preference for materials to be associated more or less with males or females, except in the Southwest sector of the cemetery, where lip studs appear to be associated with females. There is no comparative data for the remainder of cemetery.

=== Status ===
There is some type of spatial relationship present in the Northeast Sector of the cemetery, where a higher percentage of “rich” burials are found, and fewer “poor” ones. Explanations include the existence of some type of above ground marker. While there is a large amount of uniformity in artifact categories, there is a distinct pattern unique to "rich" burials, creating an area of prestige. The presence of carnelian, highly prized elsewhere during this time, supports the potential of these burials being of a social elite. There was an increased ratio in the Northeast sector, perhaps ‘lesser lineages’ trying to associate with a dominant lineage.

Only in the Northeast section of the site, where there is the highest density of burials, is there a distinct spatial pattern. The 27 burials with the most funerary objects formed a “spatial neighborhood”; there were fewer burials with fewer or no funerary objects within a 20-meter (65') radius of any “rich” burial. “In other words, there appears to have been some kind of social prohibition on burying within 20 meters (65') of these richest burials, and the individual locations of these burials were permanently marked in some unknown way. The ‘rich’ burials are identical to ‘poor’ burials in terms of construction features; they are relatively shallow, and are unlined. Individuals of both rich and poor burials are of the same homogeneous group."

== Artifacts ==
Only a fraction of the artifacts found at Jebel Moya were funerary objects; however, due to the sheer number of burials, a significant amount of material was still found. Nearly half of the graves contained no artifacts, and most of those that did contained only a few beads or lip studs. Artifacts found at habitation sites include lip studs, beads and other ornaments, hundreds of stone tools, some imported objects, and ‘several tons of potsherds’.

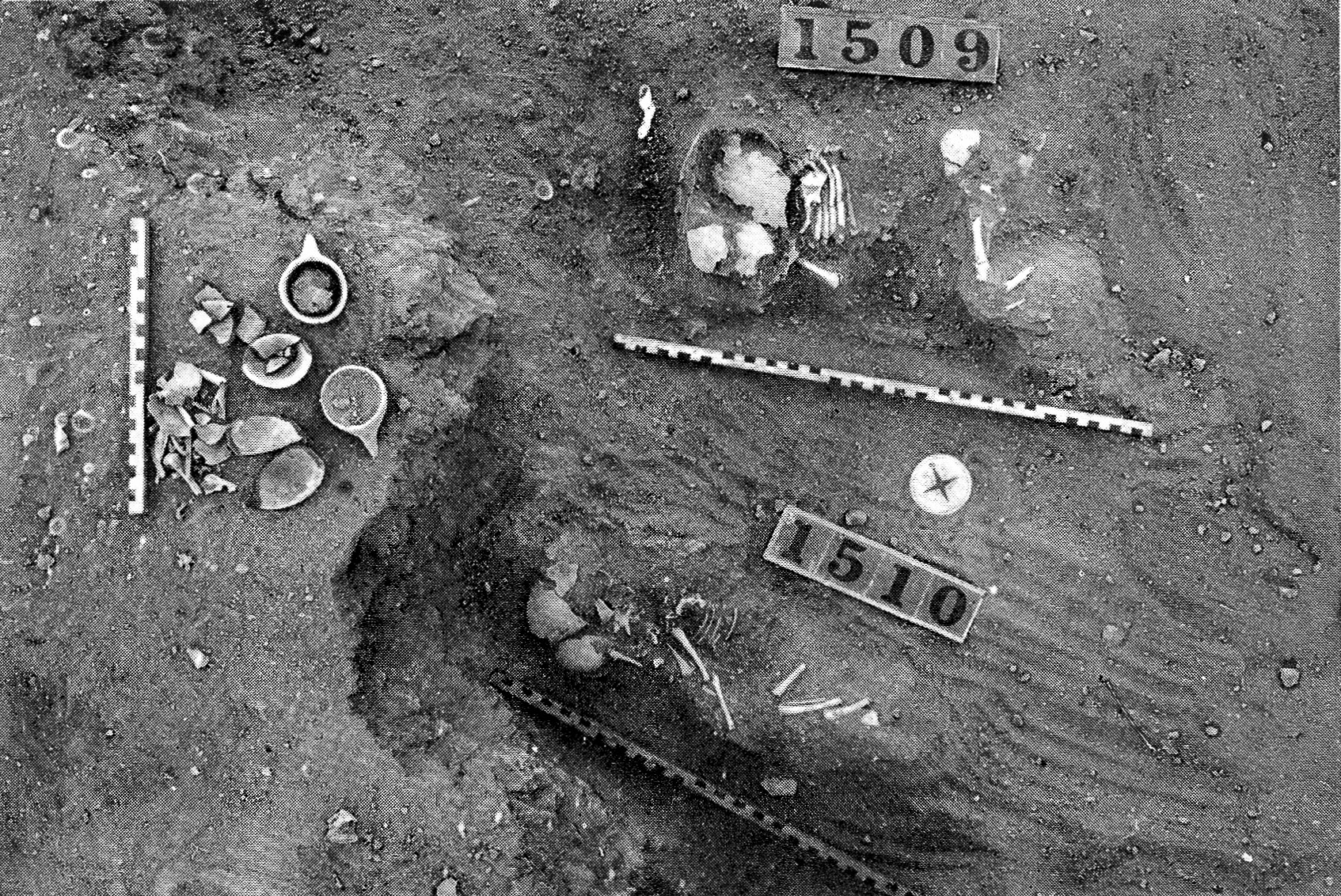
Pottery and other associated funerary objects in grave (Wellcome Collection)

Artifacts associated with the graves include: amulets, anklets, armlets, beads, bone point implements, borers, bowls, bracelets, celts, clips, coils, earrings, earstuds, grindstones, hair clips, hair ornaments, knives, lipstuds, maceheads, needles, nosestuds, pebbles, pendant, pins, quirms, rings, rubbers, scarabs, shells, and statuettes.

Some artifacts are certifiably manufactured from outside the southern Gezira plain. Burials 263 and 524 in the East and Northeast sectors respectively, each contained a bronze statuette of the Egyptian god Shu, dating either during the Napatan or Meroitic period. A scarab in a burial in the Northeast Sector of the site was described by Frank Addison as a steatite scaraboid, “engraved on both the back and the base. Back: Ram of Amen beneath a sacred tree. In front of the ram is an uraeus. Base: The name Men-Ka-Ra flanked by uraei” (Referring to Menkhepera, the first Napatan ruler of the 25th Dynasty, 747-716 BCE). The artifacts found at Jebel Moya reinforce the idea of two distinct habitation periods at Jebel Moya.

Of the burials that did contain funerary objects, the majority had only a few, often ornaments that would have been worn in life. Of the 3135 human burials, 1108 (35.3%) have associated funerary objects, and 2026 (64.7%) do not. The raw materials for these artifacts came from sources along the Nile and further north, likely brought by the Meroitic trade routes. The presence of cattle figurines (not associated with burials) as well as cattle burials supports the conclusion that the inhabitants of Jebel Moya were pastoralists. There are 55 occurrences of cattle bones among the burials at Jebel Moya, either in association with human burials, or in separate burials by themselves.

Like the human remains, only a fraction of the items found at Jebel Moya survived.

== Agriculture ==
In previous studies, the lack of agricultural equipment at Jebel Moya, contrasting Jebel et Tomat's numerous grindstones and evidence of sorghum, furthered the idea that the population at Jebel Moya was primarily pastoralist. Yet newer research led scholars to revise that point of view.

New excavations were initiated in 2017 by the University College London and the University of Khartoum, and they show a more continuous occupation of the site than was thought before. Archaeobotanical analyses were performed, and they provide evidence for domesticated taxa. Domesticated sorghum (Sorghum bicolor) was radiocarbon dated to c. 2550–2210 BC. This was a staple crop in this society, and there are many finds. Domestication in sorghum is indicated by changes in chaff and grain shape.

In 2017, domesticated-type sorghum chaff imprints in ceramics and other clay artifacts have been reported from the area of Atbara River (eastern Sudan). These were associated with the Butana Group pottery, and dated to 3500–3000 BC. This area is only about 300km (200 miles) northeast of Jebel Moya.

Jujube (Ziziphus sp.), a savanna shrub, was the only other definite food plant attested at Jebel Moya.

== Pottery ==
Most of the pottery found at Jebel Moya was not directly inside burials, but found in burial contexts. The pottery samples at Jebel Moya are categorized into assemblages by their types and dates. Assemblage 1, with only 13 remaining sherds, consists of designs and motifs using stamped objects and combs to create lines. It dates to the Late Mesolithic (late 6000s BCE). The clay used for the pottery contains sand, mica, and bone. There is no burnishing on Assemblage 1 pottery.

Assemblage 2 pottery, with 104 sherds, also was created using stamps, combs, and corded sticks. This assemblage dates to 2500-1500 BCE.

There are 369 sherds of Assemblage 3 pottery. They are highly burnished, thin in comparison to Assembly 2, and red slipped. Decorations were made with combs, stylus, and cord. Most designs on the body of the vessel were in zoned geometric forms. The temper contains mica and bone, and date from 100 BCE to 500 CE.

To attempt to gain more dating information for Jebel Moya, six sherds of pottery have been OSL dated. Three samples each from Assemblages 2 and 3 were each dated. Although OSL dating has a large standard error of deviation, there is no overlap between any of the dates from Assemblage 2 and 3 sherds. This indicates three broad temporal phases at Jebel Moya. While Assemblage 1 was not OSL dated, the relative date is 600-500 BCE, via a previous pottery analysis. There are no burials associated with pottery during this period. Similar pottery to Assemblage 2 was found at other local sites, such as Rabak to the west and at Jebel et Tomat to the northwest.

Assemblage 3 has been OSL dated from 100 BCE to 500 CE. The majority of the graves at Jebel Moya date from this time. The later occupation of Jebel et Tomat also dates to this period, whose pottery is similar to Jebel Moya's during this period. Both are thin and burnished. Assemblage 3 pottery was also found at Abu Geili, an agro-pastoralist site 30 kilometers east of Jebel Moya. The pottery found at both Jebel Moya and Abu Geili shows the socio-economic ties between their respective communities. A number of hand made pottery forms likened to that found at Jebel Moya indicate a trade network and contemporary existence between it and Abu Geili.

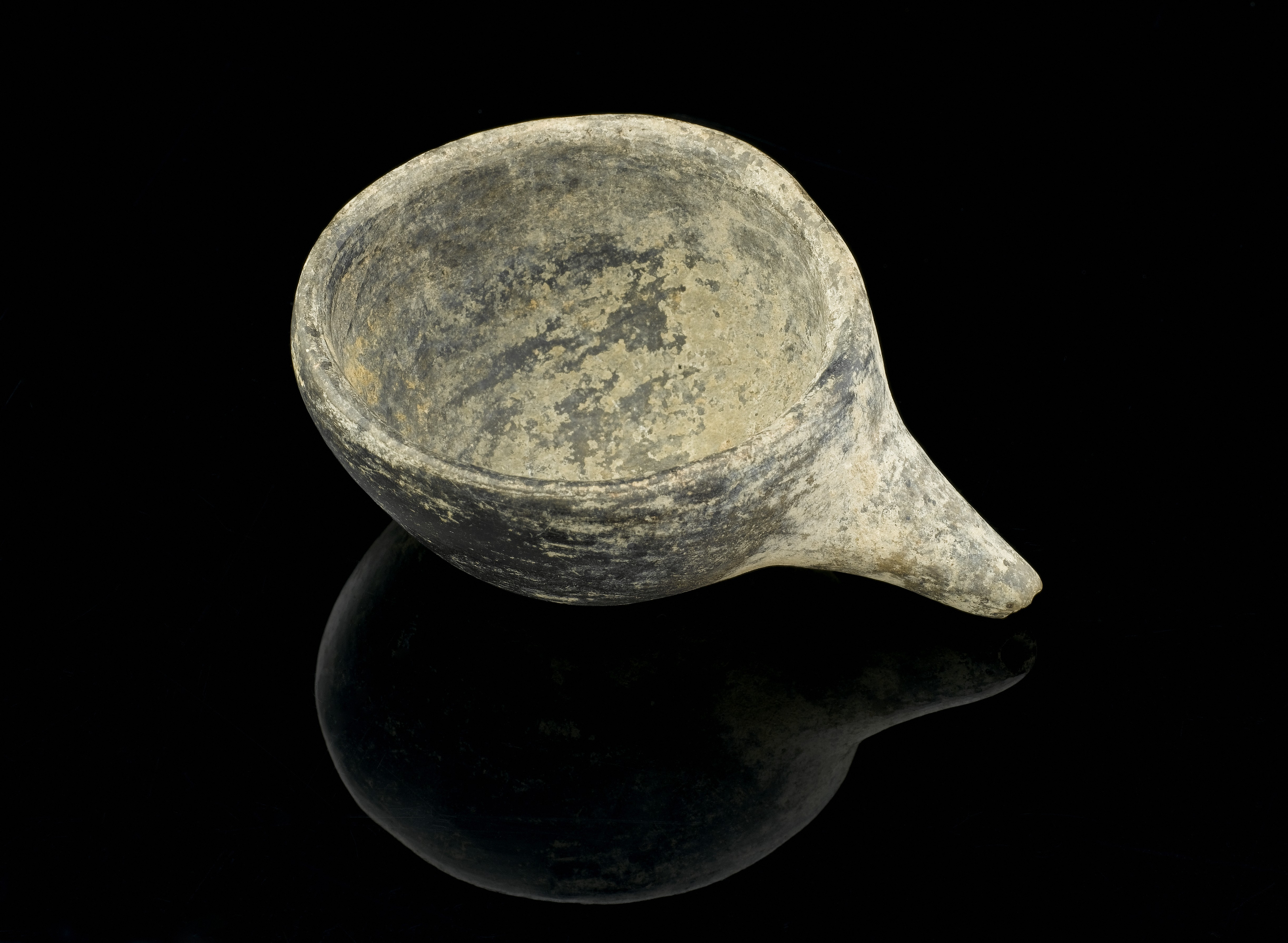
Feeding cup found in the grave of two infants

In Gerharz' study of Jebel Moya pottery he identified nine pottery categories and relatively dated them.

- Impressed and Dotted Wavy Line pottery (Phase 1)
- Rabak Ware, with everted rims and decorated lips (Phase 2)
- Incised and Rocked pottery (Phase 2 and 3)
- Scratched ware, designs were etched onto the surface using a blunt instrument once the surface was dry (Phase 3)
- Notched ware, regular dots impressed using a rocker tool (Phase 3)
- Red Painted ware, rims are often notched, sherds painted with parallel lines (similar sherds found at Abu Geili) (Phase 3)
- Channeled ware, deeply incised parallel lines (Phase 3)
- Moulded ware, small occurrences of pottery resembling crescent horns in shape (Phase 3)
- Specific vessel types from Phase 3: feeding cups, footed dishes, beaker, bowls with pedestal rings

=== Petrographic study ===
Three Period 3 sherds of pottery were petrographically tested; they all had common characteristics, which include “abundant, poorly-sorted, generally angular inclusions of quartz and feldspar in a non-calcareous clay matrix”. There was little processing to the clay before vessel construction, and no evidence of any kind of temper to the clay. This analysis also ‘confirmed’ that it was likely the inhabitants of Jebel Moya who inhabited Jebel Saqadi 20 km (10 miles) to the Northwest.

After World War II, the excavation records, remains, and artifacts were placed with the Duckworth Laboratory at the University of Cambridge, where they remain. Most of the pottery excavated at Jebel Moya was donated to the British Museum, with some finds going to the Petrie Museum (University College London), the Pitt Rivers Museum (University of Oxford) and the Museum of Archaeology and Anthropology (University of Cambridge). Only a few artifacts were returned to Sudan.

== The peoples of Jebel Moya ==
=== Craniometric data ===
Cultural diversity in artifacts suggested that Jebel Moyans could have been biologically diverse; Murkhajee et al. tested this theory by measuring the skulls of the remaining skeletons in England. Craniometric testing by Murkhajee and Rao concluded that "physical characters of the Jebel Moyans are reliably represented by the mean values for the sample" (Mukherjee); that is, the population was stable in a heterogeneous composition over time (3000 years). Craniometric data shows unlikely similarities between far west Africans (historic Ibo and Cameroon), potentially supporting an unlikely west African link.

=== Dental morphology ===
The dental study by J.D. Irish et al. was modeled on the original craniometric testing done by Murkhajee and Rao, and results were similar; ‘indications of outside biological influence’. 36 dental traits were recorded in 19 African samples. The phenetic similarity suggests that the population at Jebel Moya contains features from both sub-Saharan and North African peoples, but is specifically distinct from those populations. Results suggest that the population of Jebel Moya was uniform, but distinct, from other populations.

The population of Jebel Moya shows the closest dental similarities to North Africans, but cranially, the population was more similar to sub-Saharan samples. This could be due to different heritability of dental vs. cranial features. These results show that Jebel Moyans had a complex genetic heritage from populations surrounding central Sudan. Regardless of the origin of the population of Jebel Moya, culturally, it was distinctive from (aforementioned) outside groups. Dental data puts Jebel Moyans closest to Ethiopians and A-group Nubians, and furthers from Meroitic and C-group Nubians - which shows a cultural influence without ‘biological affinity’. The appearance of this distinct Jebel Moya group coincided with the beginning of Phase 2 (3000-800 BCE) and continued through Phase 3 (800-100BC); this corresponds with recovered skeletal remains. Gerharz regarded the Jebel Moyans as a distinct heterogeneous culture which blended various elements from outside groups. The diversity in grave types, orientations, and goods is supportive of this theory. Gerharz theory suggests that Jebel Moya was an ‘annual meeting place of widely distributed segmentary family units, the common identity of which was maintained by their periodical cohabitation there’. Overall: Jebel Moyans appeared to be most closely biologically related to northeast Africans. Culturally, there appears to be a mosaic of northern, southern, and western influences, incorporated into a distinct Jebel Moya Complex.

=== 1999 dental analysis ===
In 1999, a dental analysis was performed by Rachel Hutton MacDonald (1999). Her dental anthropological study of occlusal macrowear, buccal microwear, and carious lesions give evidence that the inhabitants of Jebel Moya were pastoralists. MacDonald studied teeth samples from Jebel Moya in comparison with hunter-gatherers, pastoralists, and agriculturalist societies. Dental caries occur when the enamel of the teeth demineralizes due to a pH in the mouth below 5.5. 2411 teeth from Jebel Moya were studied, with .2% having caries, which is the same as known pastoral societies. In contrast, the incidence of caries in Meroitic Nubia was 15.1%. The caries at Jebel Moya most frequently occurred on the third molar, whereas in known agricultural populations, caries occurred most on the second molar. Dental macrowear was also examined; wear patterns between the first and second molars were examined. Data was collected on the amount of visible dentine, the wear, angle, and wear direction. Hunter-gatherers exhibited different patterns of tooth wear (incisors an canines) relative to their molars and premolars. Pastoralists and agriculturalists wore down molars first. Hunter gatherers had rounded horizontal wear forms; pastoralists and agriculturalists had oblique wear angles, and cupped wear forms. Enamel chipping was common on the teeth from Jebel Moya; perhaps of a dietary cause, or due to the use of teeth as tools. It affected men and women equally. There was also deliberate removal of some teeth. Abscesses in pastoral populations have been attributed to teeth wearing on each other, and at Jebel Moya, the wearing of lip studs. Anterior teeth are more commonly lost to abscess in pastoralist communities. The ritual removing of these teeth at Jebel Moya could account for this. 292 individuals had teeth removed, ranging from lower central incisors, to all incisors, upper canine, etc. There are 69 instances of upper incisors being removed, and canines were removed in 8 occurrences.

=== Results ===
The results of the craniometric study, the dental morphology and general dental comparison study show the population of Jebel Moya was pastoralist in nature and distinctive bio-culturally, displaying similarities to sub-Saharan Africans. The individuals at Jebel Moya were from a pastoralist and homogeneous though biologically distinct population.

== Abandonment ==
It is unknown why Jebel Moya was abandoned; one possibility, according to M. Brass, is the alteration of trade and social networks in the southern Gezira Plain due to the spread of Christianity during the 600s CE.

== Literature ==
- Brass, Michael; Fuller, Dorian Q.; MacDonald, Kevin; Stevens, Chris; Adam, Ahmed; Kozieradzka-Ogunmakin, Iwona; Abdallah, Rayan; Alawad, Osman; Abdalla, Ammar; Gregory, Isabelle Vella; Wellings, Joss; Hassan, Fakri; Abdelrahman, Ali (2 October 2019). "New findings on the significance of Jebel Moya in the eastern Sahel". Azania: Archaeological Research in Africa. 54 (4). Informa UK Limited: 425–444. doi:10.1080/0067270x.2019.1691845. ISSN 0067-270X. PMC 6920046. PMID 31853153.

== Gallery ==
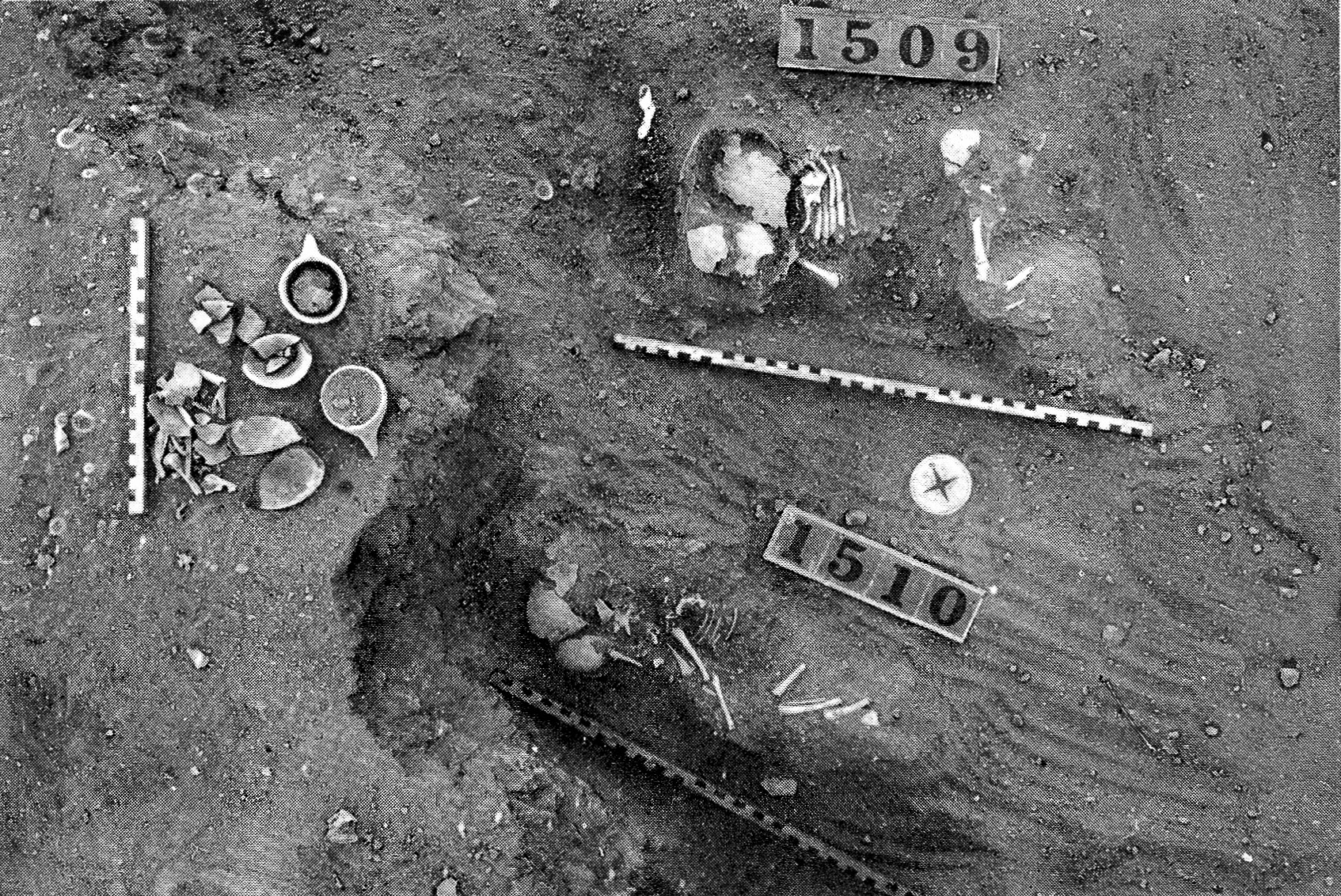
Excavations at Jebel Moya. Wellcome Collection.

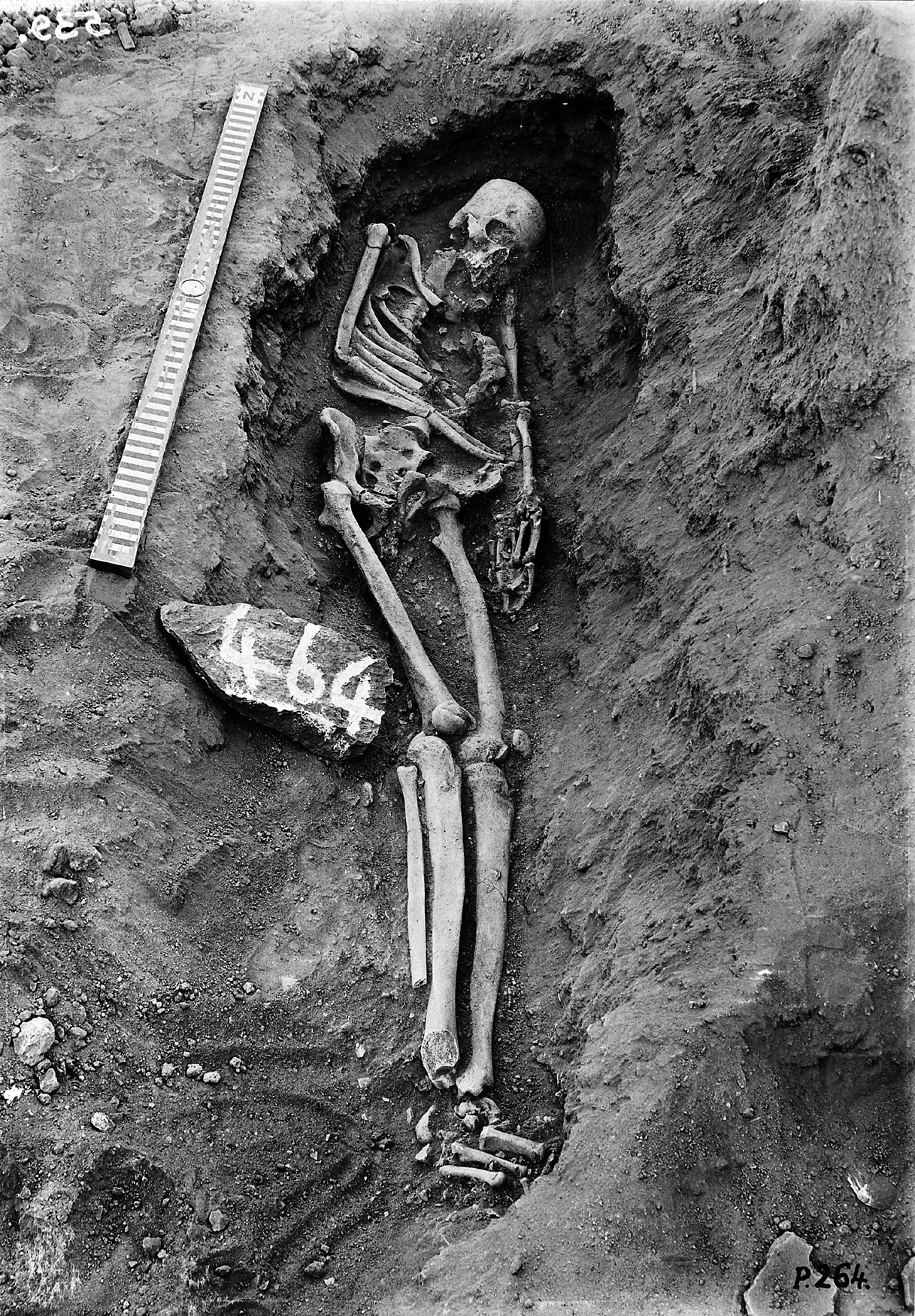
Skeleton found in situ at Jebel Moya. Wellcome Collection.

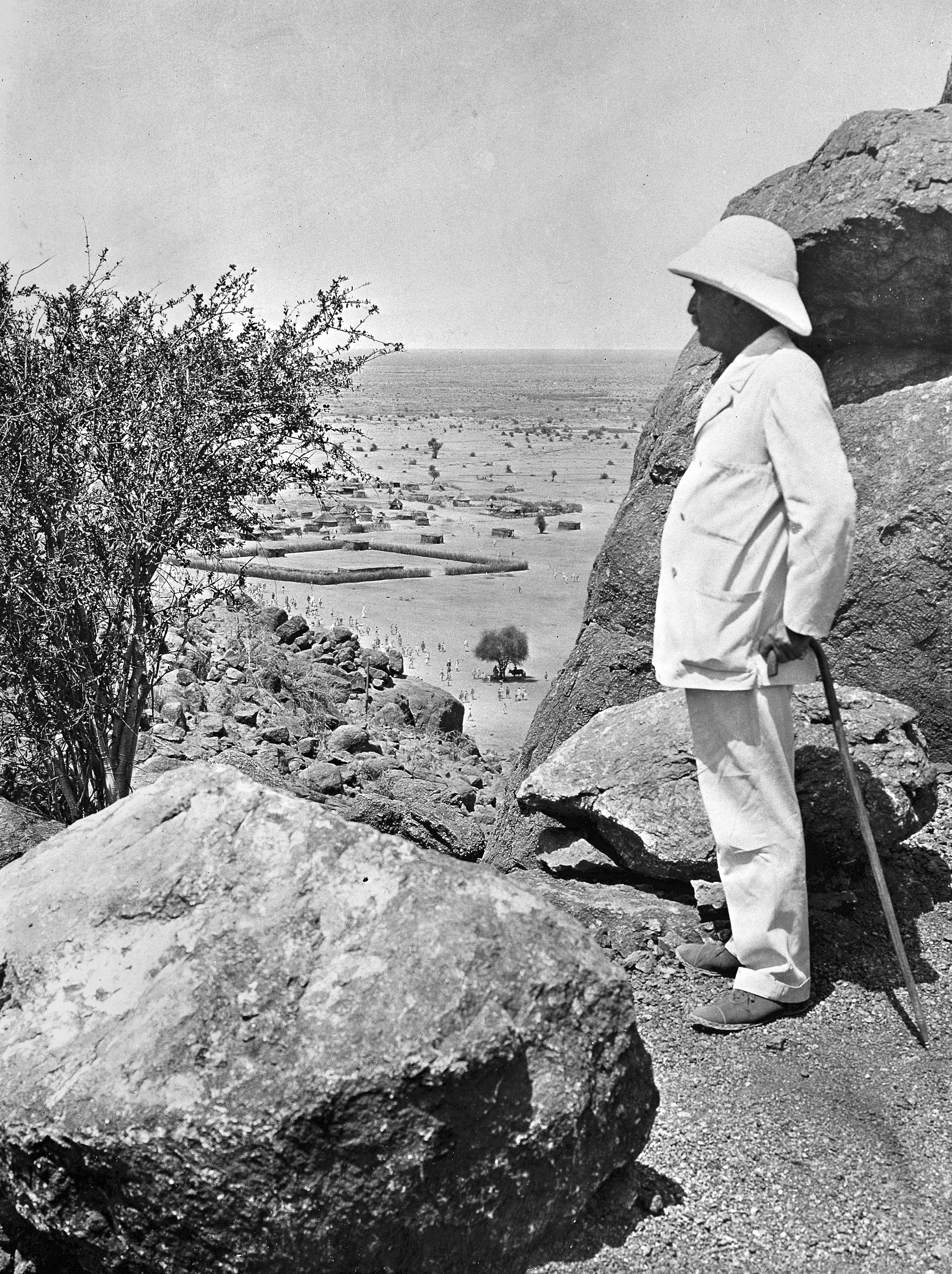
Sir Henry Wellcome at Jebel Moya. Wellcome Collection.

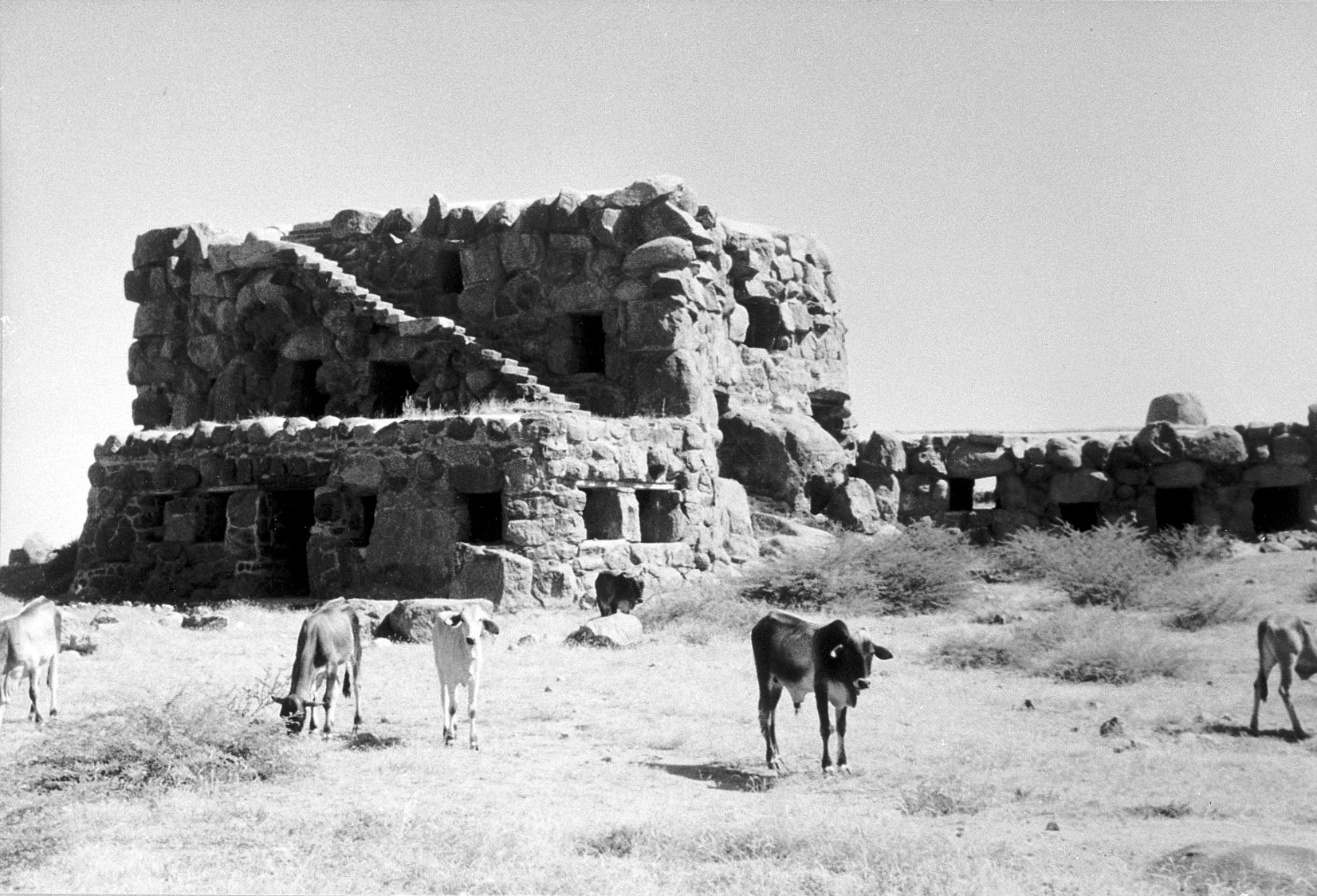
The House of Boulders at Jebel Moya. Wellcome Collection.
