= Wad Madani =

Capital city of al-Jazirah state in Sudan

Wad Madani ود مدني Greater/ Medani
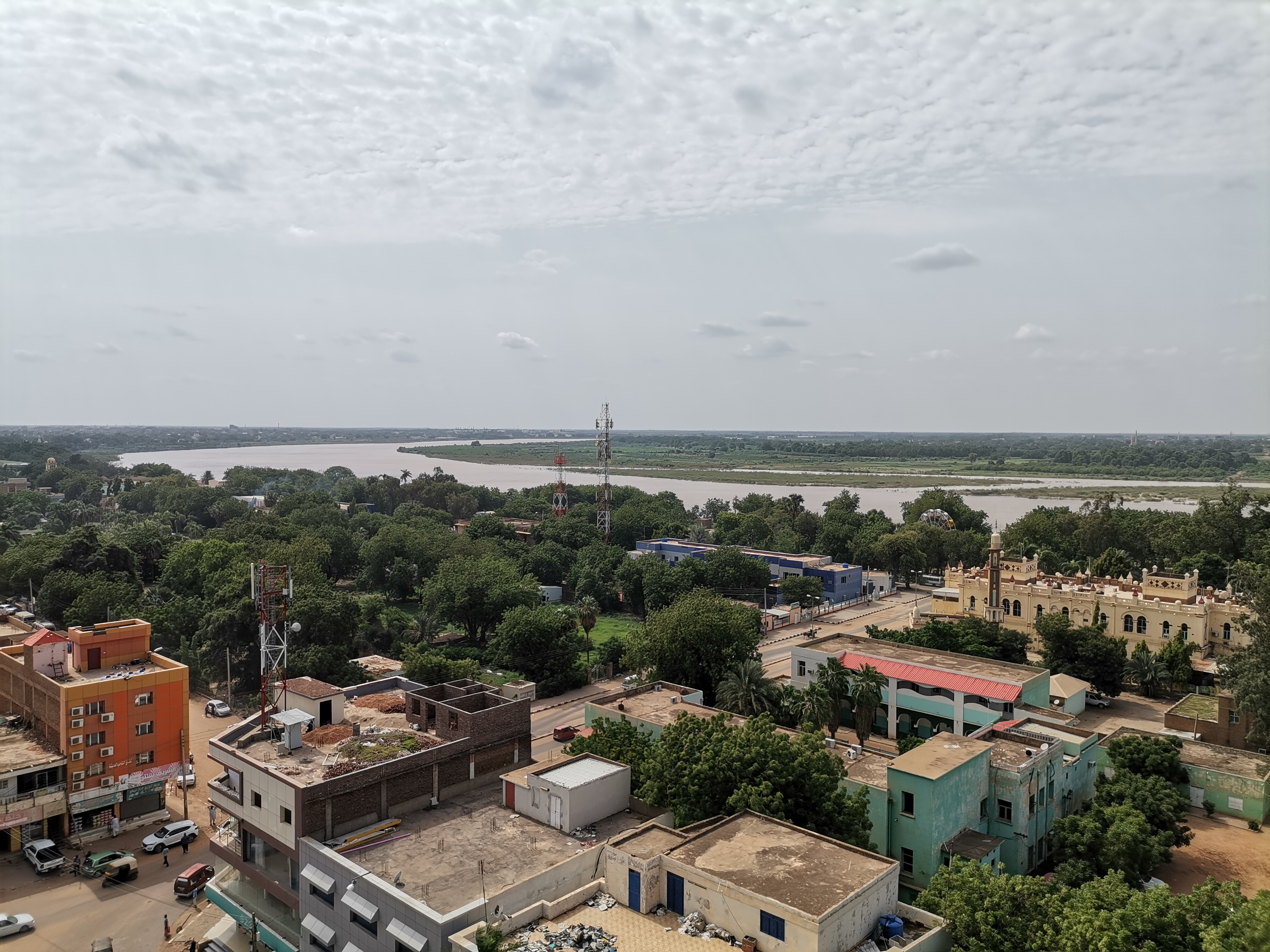
- The Blue Nile at Wad Madani

- Location in Sudan
- Coordinates: 14°24′N 33°31′E
- Country: Sudan
- State: Al Jazirah

Population (2008)
  - Total: 428,195

Wad Madani (Arabic: ود مدني, romanized: Wad Madanī; also spelled Wad Medani and known simply as Madani) is a city in Central Sudan and the capital of the Al Jazirah state. Wad Madani lies on the west bank of the Blue Nile, nearly 85 miles (136 km) southeast of Khartoum. It is linked by rail to Khartoum and is the center of a cotton-growing region. The city is also the center of local trade in wheat, peanuts, barley, and livestock. It is also headquarters of the Irrigation Service. In 2008, its population was 345,290. It is home to the University of Gezira, the second biggest public university in Sudan. It also has Wad Medani Ahlia University, a private university.

== History ==
In the medieval period the region was part of the Christian Nubian kingdom of Alodia. In the mid-19th century Wad Medani reportedly still featured ruined "crypts and subterranean churches". In the early 19th century, a district governor of Wad Madani (Madani) was Daf ʿAllah Muhammad, who was married to the Funj noblewoman Nasra bint ʿAdlan; they built a palace close to Madani, with a village called Suriba. It became a small Turko-Egyptian outpost, which grew rapidly following the 1925 Gezira Scheme of irrigation to stimulate local economic development. Wad Madani is a commercial centre of the Gezira agricultural district and is mostly residential. Wad Madani has lively commercial activities with well-stocked souqs.

The river banks of Wad Madani lie East the Blue Nile, which flows into Sudan from Ethiopia. The city's facilities are more modern than most places in Sudan, except in the Khartoum area.

Famous people from Wad Madani include the popular Sudanese singers Insaf Madani, Abdel Aziz El Mubarak, Mohammed al Amin and Ibrahim Al Kashif. Further, the renowned human rights lawyer and President of the Sudan Human Rights Monitor, Dr. Amin Mekki Medani, and the Chairman of the National Consensus Forces, Farouk Abu Issa. The center of the town is made up of the souq, Al Daraga, Al Gism Al Awal, Wad Azrag and the Sudanese District (formerly known as the British District).

On 15 December 2023, during the War in Sudan, the Battle of Wad Madani took place, as the Rapid Support Forces attacked the Sudanese Armed Forces in the region. The attack was repelled on 17 December 2023. But just a day later the RSF attacked the city again. The attack was successful and the Rapid Support Forces took control of the city after the Sudanese Armed Forces withdrew. The Sudanese Armed Forces retook control of Wad Madani on 11 January 2025.

== Geography ==
=== Climate ===
Wad Madani has a hot arid climate (Köppen climate classification BWh), despite receiving over 13 inches or 330 millimetres of rain per year, owing to the exceedingly high potential evapotranspiration.

Climate data for Wad Madani (1991–2020)
Month	Jan	Feb	Mar	Apr	May	Jun	Jul	Aug	Sep	Oct	Nov	Dec	Year
Record high °C (°F)	41.3 (106.3)	44.8 (112.6)	45.6 (114.1)	46.6 (115.9)	47.4 (117.3)	47.0 (116.6)	44.6 (112.3)	41.0 (105.8)	43.0 (109.4)	44.5 (112.1)	41.6 (106.9)	40.8 (105.4)	47.4 (117.3)
Mean daily maximum °C (°F)	33.4 (92.1)	35.9 (96.6)	38.9 (102.0)	41.8 (107.2)	42.0 (107.6)	40.7 (105.3)	36.9 (98.4)	34.5 (94.1)	36.2 (97.2)	38.4 (101.1)	37.2 (99.0)	34.5 (94.1)	37.5 (99.5)
Daily mean °C (°F)	24.1 (75.4)	26.4 (79.5)	29.2 (84.6)	32.2 (90.0)	33.5 (92.3)	33.0 (91.4)	30.2 (86.4)	28.5 (83.3)	29.4 (84.9)	30.3 (86.5)	27.9 (82.2)	25.1 (77.2)	29.1 (84.4)
Mean daily minimum °C (°F)	14.9 (58.8)	16.9 (62.4)	19.5 (67.1)	22.6 (72.7)	25.0 (77.0)	25.3 (77.5)	23.6 (74.5)	22.5 (72.5)	22.5 (72.5)	22.1 (71.8)	18.6 (65.5)	15.7 (60.3)	20.8 (69.4)
Record low °C (°F)	4.2 (39.6)	4.4 (39.9)	9.0 (48.2)	12.0 (53.6)	17.6 (63.7)	18.7 (65.7)	17.7 (63.9)	13.2 (55.8)	17.6 (63.7)	12.0 (53.6)	8.2 (46.8)	5.5 (41.9)	4.2 (39.6)
Average precipitation mm (inches)	0.5 (0.02)	0.0 (0.0)	0.0 (0.0)	0.7 (0.03)	13.2 (0.52)	26.4 (1.04)	91.8 (3.61)	108.1 (4.26)	44.9 (1.77)	14.6 (0.57)	0.5 (0.02)	0.0 (0.0)	300.7 (11.84)
Average precipitation days (≥ 1.0 mm)	0.1	0.0	0.0	0.2	1.6	3.1	6.6	8.8	4.2	2.0	0.1	0.0	26.7
Average relative humidity (%)	32	27	22	22	30	41	59	69	65	52	36	35	41
Mean monthly sunshine hours	319.3	291.2	310.0	300.0	279.0	261.0	217.0	213.9	249.0	297.6	315.0	322.4	3,375.4
Source: NOAA

== Transport ==
Two trans-African automobile routes pass through Wad Medani:

- Cairo-Cape Town Highway
- Ndjamena-Djibouti Highway

== Education ==
Wad Madani provides for a range of educational institutions on four levels of education. Starting from kindergarten and day-care centres, on to primary or elementary schools, and until secondary schools. For higher education, there are two universities, the University of Gezira and Wad Medani Ahlia University.

== Cultural life ==
In an article about the rise and decline of cinema in the city of Wad Madani, the popularity of "going to the movies" was explained in terms of its importance for public cultural life, providing a "fresh breath of freedom in light of the country’s independence." For many urban dwellers, movie shows were the only public forms of entertainment at the time. This applied both to educated and less educated people, as well as to women and girls, who were admitted as families in the company of their male relatives.

In a provincial town like Wad Madani, film shows started in the early 1950s in the form of mobile cinemas. This type of film show was presented in different neighbourhoods by the Ministry of Information by means of automobiles that could provide for a screen and a projector, managed by a specialised projectionist. Later, dedicated outdoor cinemas were built for regular shows, and in the 1970s, there were six such cinemas in Wad Madani. The films included Arab, Indian and other foreign films, for example "Guess who’s Coming to Dinner" or "War and Peace" and chosen by the 'Sudanese Cinema Institution' under the Ministry of Information. Also, international news broadcasts, for example by the BBC, were included. Censorship was exercised by special committees in order to protect social cultural values, but still with respect to the plot and artistic character of the films. Such evenings spent at the cinema "sparked heated discussions about the films being screened that carried on long after the film ended, in social occasions that brought communities together."

Starting in the 1970s, the spread of television and, more importantly, new taxes and restrictive laws, introduced in September 1983 by the Islamist government under Jaafar Nimeiry and followed by stricter censorship, led to the decline of cinemas that became gradually abandoned and derelict. Frequent cinema goers turned away from the films that could still be shown, as these performances no longer provided "a space for their rebellion against issues afflicting internal and external societies such as racism, injustice and politics."

== Notable people ==
- Nasra bint ʿAdlan, noblewoman
- Amin Mekki Medani, human rights lawyer
- Farouk Abu Issa, lawyer and politician
- Alexander Siddig, British actor of Sudanese origin
- John Simonian, Kenyan field hockey player
- Abdel Aziz El Mubarak, singer and band leader
- Ibrahim Al Kashif, singer-songwriter
- Rashid Diab, artist
- Mohammed al Amin, singer

== See also ==
- List of cities in Sudan
- List of schools in Sudan
