= Ramkrishna Mukherjee =

- Born: 14 November 1917; Baranagar, Calcutta, Bengal Presidency, British India
- Died: 15 November 2015 (aged 98); Kolkata, West Bengal, India
- Education: M.Sc (Anthropology) and PhD
- Alma mater: Presidency College; University of Calcutta
- Spouse: Prabhati Mukherjee
- Awards: Swami Pranavanad Award; Jawaharlal Nehru Award for Social Sciences; Asiatic Society Gold Medal; Lifetime Achievement Award of Indian Sociological Society
- Scientific career
- Fields: Sociology, Anthropology, Statistics
- Institutions: Indian Statistical Institute; Indian Sociological Society

Ramkrishna Mukherjee (14 November 1917 – 15 November 2015) was a scientist at the Indian Statistical Institute, Kolkata, President of the Indian Sociological Society (1973–75) and recipient of the Indian Sociological Society's Lifetime Achievement Award in 2005.

He is particularly well known for his study Dynamics of a Rural Society and his dialectical method in dealing with the study of Indian society.

== Early life and education ==
He was born to a middle-class family in Kolkata, India, his father Satindra Nath being an engineer in the Indian Railways. He obtained MSc degree in 1941 from University of Calcutta and a PhD in 1948 from the University of Cambridge, United Kingdom. From 1941 to 1944 he was an activist in the Peasant movement. Although he specialized in human genetics, he took lessons in statistics from Prasanta Chandra Mahalanobis, founder of the ISI.

== Career ==
In 1948 and 1949 he was Chief Research Officer to His Majesty's Social Survey, London and had been Consultant to Government of Turkey in 1949 and Consultant to the London School of Economics in 1952. He began his career as a Professor at the Institute of Indian Studies at Humboldt University of Berlin in Germany from 1953 to 1957. He was adjunct professor at Binghamton University in the United States from 1977 to 1989. He spent most of his professional life with the Indian Statistical Institute from 1944 until his retirement in 1979.

== Work ==
Along with DP Mukerji, he established the All India Sociological Conference (AISC). He worked as adviser for social science institutions and journals in India and abroad. With his work the theme of agrarian social structure and change was to re-appear in Indian Sociology only after a gap of nearly two decades in the late 1960s and 1970s. Among Indian sociologists, he stressed the importance of a dialectic model for the study of Indian society and made systematic as well as empirical studies using this model. This is exemplified by his book Rise and Fall of East India Company (1958) which is a contribution to economic and social history of the institutionalization of colonialism in India . He tried to develop an inductive methodology for social sciences. His research interests included genetics, studies in classification of families, rural society, historical sociology, problems of acculturation and Social Indicators Research besides which he contributed over subjects like family, caste and class, agrarian relations in West Bengal, nationalism in Bangladesh, urbanization and social change and colonial exploitation by the East India Company and in Uganda, and also contributed towards designing of National Sample Surveys. He had a Marxian and historical perspective with which he studied social institutions such as family and caste.

== Awards and honors ==
- Asiatic Society Gold Medal for Anthropology (1981)
- National Fellow, Indian Council of Social Science Research from 1992 to 1994
- Swami Pranavanand Education Award for Sociology by University Grants Commission| New Delhi,(1985)
- "Pandit Jawaharla Nehru National Award Social Science" (PDF). 1986. Archived from the original (PDF) on 3 May 2019.by Government of Madhya Pradesh
- Member-Executive Committee, International Sociological Association| (ISA) (1976)

== Personal life ==
Mukherjee married Prabhati Mukherjee, an academician, who died in 2008. They had two daughters, both of whom entered the academic field.

== Selected publications ==
=== Books ===
- Mukherjee, Trevor, Rao (1955). Ancient Inhabitants of Jabel Moya Sudan. Cambridge University Press. ISBN 9780521134743.
- Mukherjee, Ramkrishna (1965). The Sociologist and Social Change in India Today. New Delhi, Prentice Hall. ASIN B000IUNVH6. OCLC 8323616.
- Mukherjee, Ramkrishna (1971). Six villages of Bengal. Popular Prakashan. ASIN B0006CDL3U.
- Mukherjee, Ramkrishna (1957). The Dynamics of A Rural Society-A study of the Economic Structure of Bengal Villages. Akademie-verlag- Berlin. ISBN 9788171552153.
- Mukherjee, Ramkrishna (1958). The Rise and Fall of the East India Company-A Sociological Appraisal. Popular Prakashan. ISBN 978-0853453154.
- Mukherjee, Ramkrishna (1975). Social Indicators. Delhi, MacMillan Company. ISBN 978-0333900901. OCLC 2290516.
- Mukherjee, Ramkrishna (1976). Family and Planning in India. Bombay, Orient Longman. OCLC 3558626.
- Mukherjee, Ramkrishna (1978). What will it be? Explorations in Inductive Sociology. Carolina Academic Press. ISBN 978-0890890943. OCLC 5979960.
- Mukherjee, Ramkrishna (1984). Classification in Social Research. State University, New York. p. 55. ISBN 9780873956079. "087395607g."
- Mukherjee, Ramkrishna (2009). The Measure of Time in the Appraisal of Social Reality. Cambridge Scholar Publishing. ISBN 9781443805766.
- Mukherjee, Ramkrishna (1985). Uganda, an historical accident?:Class, Nation and State Formation. Africa Research and Publications. ISBN 0865430152.
- Mukherjee, Ramkrishna (1989). The Quality of Life, Valuation in Social Research. Sage publications. ISBN 9780803995871.ISBN 0803995873
- Mukherjee, Ramkrishna (2008). Why Unitary Social Science?. Cambridge Scholar Publishing. ISBN 9781443803076.
- Mukherjee, Ramkrishna (1993). Systemic Sociology. Sage Publications. ISBN 978-8170363521.
- Mukherjee, Ramkrishna (1977). West Bengal Family Structures,1946-1966: An Example of Viability of Joint family. South Asia Books. ISBN 9780333901311.
- Mukherjee, Ramkrishna (1991). Society, Culture, Development. Sage Publications. ISBN 0803991029.
- Mukherjee, Ramkrishna (1979). Sociology of Indian Sociology. Bombay Allied. OCLC 6280302.

=== Felicitation volumes ===
- Mukherjee, Mukherjee (2000). Methodology in Social Research- Dilemmas and Perspectives-Essays in Honor of Ramkrishna Mukherjee. Sage Publications. ISBN 9780761994404.
- Mukherjee, Kar (2002). Globalization-Trends and Perspectives - Essays in Honor of Ramkrishna Mukherjee (PDF). Kolkata Directed Initiatives. OCLC 52929145.
- Bhattacharya, Ghosh, Das (1995). Sociology in the Rubric Social Science- Professor Ramkrishna Mukherjee felicitation volume. Anthropological Survey of India. ISBN 978-8185579337.
- MukherjeeParthNath; et al. (2018). Understanding Social Dynamics in South Asia: Essays in memory of Ramkrishna Mukherjee. Springer. ISBN 978-9811303869.

=== Selected journal articles ===
- Mukherjee, Mahalnobis, Ghosh (1946). "A Sample Survey of After-Effects of the Bengal Famine". Sankhya. 7 (4): 337–400. JSTOR 25047881.
- Mukherjee, Ramkrishna (1962). "Sociologists and Social Change in India Today". Sociological Bulletin. 11 (1/2): 4–13. doi:10.1177/0038022919620102. JSTOR 23618811. S2CID 157545526.
- Mukherjee, Ramkrishna (1968). "Some observations on diachronic and synchronic aspects of social change". Social Science Information. 7: 31–53. doi:10.1177/053901846800700102. S2CID 145794697.
- Mukherjee, Ramkrishna (1972). "Social Background of Bangla Desh". Economic and Political Weekly. 7 (5/7): 265–274. JSTOR 4361004.
- Mukherjee, Ramkrishna (1969). "Empirical social research on contemperory India". Social Science Information. 8 (6): 69–83. doi:10.1177/053901846900800605. S2CID 145166890.
- Mukherjee, Ramkrishna (1981). "Realities of Agrarian Relations in India". Economic and Political Weekly. 16 (4): 109–116. JSTOR 4369463.
- Mukherjee, Ramkrishna (1979). "For a Sociology of India-Trends in Indian Sociology". Contributions to Indian Sociology. 13 (2): 319–332. doi:10.1177/006996677901300207. S2CID 143637640.
- Mukherjee, Ramkrishna (1981). "On the Use of Social Indicators for Planning". Social Indicators Research. 9 (2): 183–195. doi:10.1007/BF00286196. S2CID 144470812.
- Mukherjee, Ramkrishna (1986). "I P Desai and Sociology of India". Economic and Political Weekly. 21 (4): 164–168. JSTOR 4375254.
- Mukherjee, Ramkrishna (1991). "Social and Cultural Components of Society and Appraisal of Social Reality". Economic and Political Weekly. 26 (4): PE21–PE36. JSTOR 4397241.
- Mukherjee, Ramkrishna (1998). "Social Reality and Culture". Current Sociology. 46 (2): 39–50. doi:10.1177/0011392198046002005. S2CID 143726807.
- Mukherjee, Ramkrishna (1974). "The Sociologist and The Social Reality". Sociological Bulletin. 23 (2): 169–192. doi:10.1177/0038022919740202. JSTOR 23618941. S2CID 151484377.
- Mukherjee, Ramkrishna (1999). "Caste in Itself, Caste and Class, or Caste in Class". Economic and Political Weekly. 34 (27): 1759–1761. JSTOR 4408152.
- Mukherjee, Ramkrishna (1970). "Study of Social Change and Social Development in Developing Societies". Economic and Political Weekly. 5 (29/31): 1159–1170. JSTOR 4360261.
- Mukherjee; et al. (1970). "Data Inventory on Social Sciences:India:First Phase:1967-68". Sankhya. 32 (1/2): 99–140. JSTOR 25051723.
- Mukherjee, Ramkrishna (1989). "Radha Kamal Mukerjee—A Note". Sociological Bulletin. 38 (2): 261–265. doi:10.1177/0038022919890207. JSTOR 23619815. S2CID 157343186.
