= Igd al-Jalad =

Sudanese popular music group

Igd al-Jalād, (Arabic: عقد الجلاد, also spelled Igd Algalad in English) is a popular Sudanese music group. It was founded in 1984, comprising several singers and instrumentalists and has been active with new members since then. The group became famous both for their musical compositions as well as their use of lyrics with metaphorical political messages, written by Sudanese and other Arab poets, such as Mahjoub Sharif or Muhammad Taha Al-Qaddal, "giving voice to the neglected, disadvantaged, and those who are left behind."

== Career ==
The group's name means "beaded necklace of jalād", which refers to a special kind of leather with a pleasant scent, made from the skin of a deer or a wild cat that is traditionally worn by a bride during the girtig ceremony. In 1984, the founder of the group, composer and musician Osman al-Naou assembled a large number of male and female musicians from the Institute of Music and Drama. This allowed the band to include both a range of modern instruments as well as male and female lead singers and a chorus. In 1988, the group appeared in a live concert on Sudanese TV that started its growing popularity both at home and with Sudanese audiences abroad. Characteristically, they use well-known poems and other lyrics, often expressing patriotic views or political messages. This metaphorical criticism of the political situation during the military governments from the 1980s onwards prompted the police to ban some of their concerts and some of the members were even taken into custody.

In 1995, the German record label Popular African Music released their CD Madaris, and other music cassettes or CDs have been available in Sudan. All through the period of political oppression of public musical activities by the military government and the imposition of Sharia laws starting in the 1980s, Igd al-Jalād have been re-inventing their line-up by including younger musicians and composed new songs, making it one of Sudan's most long-standing and popular music bands.

== Discography ==
- Igd al-Jalad on discogs.com
- CD Madaris with short sound samples for online listening, 1995

== External links to music videos ==
- Igd al-Jallad on Facebook
- Igd al-Jalad on YouTube
