= Ministry of Foreign Affairs (Sudan) =

Government ministry of Sudan

Coordinates: 15°36′34″N 32°31′56″E

Republic of the Sudan Ministry of Foreign Affairs
- وزارة الخارجية

Agency overview
- Jurisdiction: Government of Sudan
- Headquarters: Khartoum (Sudan)
- Agency executive: Mohi El-Din Salem, Minister
- Website: Official website

The Ministry of Foreign Affairs (Arabic: وزارة الشؤون الخارجية) is the Sudanese cabinet ministry which oversees the foreign relations of Sudan.

== List of ministers ==
This is a list of ministers of foreign affairs of Sudan:

No.	Name (Birth–Death)	Portrait	Tenure
Republic of the Sudan (1956–1969)
1	Mubarak Zarouk (1916–1965)		1956
2	Muhammad Ahmad Mahgoub (1908–1976)		1956–1958
3	Sayed Ahmad Keir (1905–1994)		1958–1964
(2)	Muhammad Ahmad Mahgoub (1908–1976)		1964–1965
4	Muhammad Ibrahim Khalil (b. 1921)		1965–1966
5	Ibrahim al-Mufti		1966–1967
(2)	Muhammad Ahmad Mahgoub (1908–1976)		1967–1968
6	Ali Abdel Rahman al-Amin		1968–1969
Democratic Republic of the Sudan (1969–1985)
7	Babiker Awadalla (1917–2019)		1969–1970
8	Jaafar Nimeiry (1930–2009)		1970–1971
9	Farouk Abu Issa (1933–2020)		1971
10	Mansour Khalid (1931–2020)		1971–1975
11	Gamal Muhammad Ahmed (1917–?)		1975–1976
12	Mahgoub Makawy		1976–1977
(10)	Mansour Khalid (1931–2020)		1977
13	Rashid Bakr (1930–1988)		1977–1980
14	Muhammad Mirghani Mubarak		1980–1984
15	Hashim Osman		1984–1985
Republic of the Sudan (1985–present)
16	Ibrahim Taha Ayoub (b. 1940)		1985–1986
17	Zayn al-Abidin ash-Sharif al-Hindi (b. 1932)		1986–1987
18	Muhammad Tawfiq Ahmad		1987
19	Mamoun Mahgoub Sinada		1987–1988
20	Hussein Suleiman Abu Saleh (1930–2021)		1988–1989
21	Hassan Al-Turabi (1932–2016)		1989
22	Sid Ahmad al-Hussein		1989
23	Ali Sahloul (b. 1930)		1989–1993
(20)	Hussein Suleiman Abu Saleh (1930–2021)		1993–1995
24	Ali Osman Taha (b. 1944)		1995–1998
25	Mustafa Osman Ismail (b. 1955)		1998–2005
26	Lam Akol (b. 1950)		2005–2007
27	Deng Alor Kuol		2007–2010
28	Ali Ahmed Karti (b. 1953)		2010–2015
29	Ibrahim Ghandour (b. 1952)		2015–2018
—	Mohamed Abdalla Idris Acting Minister		2018
30	al-Dirdiri Mohamed Ahmed		2018–2019
31	Asma Mohamed Abdalla (b. 1946)		2019–2020
—	Omar Gamar-Eldin Ismail Acting Minister		2020–2021
32	Mariam al-Mahdi (b. 1965)	Mariam al-Mahdi in 2013	2021
33	Ali Al-Sadiq Ali Acting Minister		2022-2024
34	Hussein Awad Ali		2023-2024
35	Ali Yousif		2024-2025
36	Hussein Al-Amin		2025
37	Omar Mohammed Ahmed Siddiq		2025
38	Mohi El-Din Salem		2025–

== See also ==
- Cabinet of Sudan
