= Mansour Khalid =

Sudanese lawyer, diplomat, and scholar (1931–2020)

Young Mansour Khalid

Mansour Khalid (Arabic: منصور خالد; 17 January 1931 – 22 April 2020) was a Sudanese lawyer, diplomat, and scholar, who published several books. He served as the Minister of Foreign Affairs of Sudan from 1971 to 1975 and briefly in 1977. He also served as first vice chairman of the World Commission on Environment and Development, also known as the Brundtland Commission, after the Chair of the commission, who was Gro Harlem Brundtland (former Prime Minister of Norway). He played an important role in negotiating the peace accord known as the Addis Ababa Agreement which ended the First Sudanese Civil War in 1972.

== Education ==
Mansour Khaled studied at the University of Khartoum and the University of Pennsylvania. He also studied in Algiers and Paris.

== Career ==
Mansour Khaled held many positions of public service. He worked in the United Nations Secretariat from 1961 to 1962; for the UN Technical Assistance program in Algiers (1963–64); and for UNESCO in Paris (1965–69). In Sudan, he served as Minister of Youth and Sports (1969–70), then at the United Nations representing Sudan, and then as Sudanese Foreign Minister (1971–75). Her served as Minister of Education from 1975 to 1976. According to the historian John O. Voll, he also played a critical role in negotiating the Addis Ababa Agreement of 1972, which ended the First Sudanese Civil War. Mansour Khaled maintained cordial relations with southern Sudanese leader John Garang and later South Sudanese president Salva Kiir, and earned such respect that the South Sudanese government ordered flags to be flown at half-mast in his honor when he died.

Mansour Khaled wrote many books about Sudanese history and politics, in both English and Arabic. Among these were The Government They Deserve: The Role of the Elite in Sudan's Political Evolution (London: Kegan Paul, 1990) and War and Peace in Sudan: A Tale of Two Countries (London: Kegan Paul, 2003). His Arabic books include a study of the southern Sudan in the Arab political imagination.
