= Darfur Peace and Development Organization =

American Darfurian-ran nonprofit

The Darfur Peace and Development Organization (DPDO) is a small Darfurian-run non-profit organization, based in the United States, dedicated to fostering reconciliation in the Darfur region of Sudan. It is committed to promoting and restoring peace and sustainable development in Darfur, Western Sudan, in Africa.

In operation since 2002, it is a non-sectarian organization with headquarters in Washington, DC, and offices in Khartoum and El Fasher Sudan. DPDO works to foster reconciliation, to facilitate just governance and to enable Darfurians to rebuild their homeland in effective, sustainable ways. It also promotes awareness of the crisis in the United States. Their mission is to provide humanitarian relief for victims of the genocide in Darfur, to facilitate just governance, and to enable Darfurians to effectively rebuild and develop their homeland.
