= Kamil Idris government =

2025 cabinet of Sudan

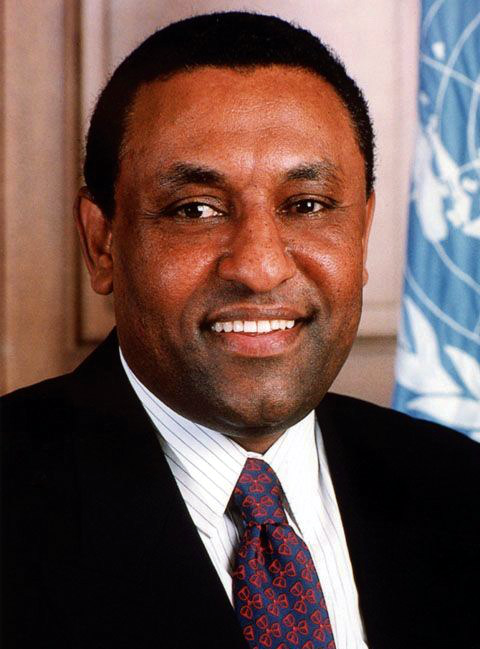
- Kamil Idris
- Date formed: 31 May 2025

People and organisations
- President: Transitional Sovereignty Council
- Prime Minister: Kamil Idris
- No. of ministers: 22
- Status in legislature: Transitional

History
- Predecessor: Dafallah al-Haj Ali government

The Kamil Idris government is the internationally recognised cabinet of the Republic of Sudan formed when Kamil Idris was appointed as prime minister of Sudan by the president of the Transitional Sovereignty Council, Abdel Fattah al-Burhan on 31 May 2025.

== Background ==
Sudanese president Omar al-Bashir was overthrown in a coup d'état in April 2019 following a series of large-scale protests. A 39-month transition to democracy was planned with the role of head of state being performed by a Transitional Sovereignty Council and a transitional government led by Abdalla Hamdok was formed to govern the country until elections planned for July 2023. The transition period ended abruptly when the transitional government was dissolved following a further coup d'état, led by Abdel Fattah al-Burhan, in October 2021. A civil war between the al-Burhan led Sudanese Armed Forces (SAF) and the paramilitary Rapid Support Forces (RSF) led by Mohamed Hamdan Dagalo broke out in April 2023. Initially the RSF gained control of the capital, Khartoum and parts of Southern and Western Sudan. However, by early 2025, the SAF had regained ground around Khartoum and by mid-February 2025, had control over about two thirds of the Khartoum metropolitan area. In January 2026 the government returned to Khartoum after operating from Port Sudan.

== Formation ==
Plans for the formation of a transitional government were announced by on 10 February 2025, following sweeping gains made by the Sudanese Armed Forces in recent weeks. Al-Burhan stated that a technocratic cabinet would be led by a civilian prime minister and include independent experts. Sudan's foreign ministry published a roadmap including the formation of a transitional government and a national dialogue with civil society groups, leading to free and fair elections at the end of the transition period.

The foreign ministry requested support from the African Union, the United Nations, and the Arab League to support the roadmap. On 18 February 2025, the Rapid Support Forces announced plans to form their own rival government, the Government of Peace and Unity, to administer the parts of Sudan under RSF control. On 19 February 2025, the Transitional Sovereignty Council updated the transitional constitution, paving the way for the formation of a new transitional government.

Kamil Idris was named prime minister by the Transitional Sovereignty Council on 19 May 2025. The appointment of a new prime minister and formation of a civilian-led transitional government was welcomed by the United Nations, African Union and the Intergovernmental Authority on Development. On 29 July 2025, the African Union's Peace and Security Council reiterated its recognition of the Transitional Sovereignty Council and the transitional civilian government as the two legitimate authorities in Sudan.

== Ministers ==
Kamil Idriss was named prime minister by the Transitional Sovereignty Council on 19 May 2025 and sworn in on 31 May 2025. Plans for a 22 ministerial team, dubbed the "Government of Hope", were outlined by prime minister Kamil Idris on 19 June 2025.

Portfolio	Incumbent	Period
Prime Minister of Sudan	Kamil Idris	2025-
Minister of Agriculture and Irrigation	Ismat Qureshi Abdallah	2025-
Minister of Cabinet Affairs	Lemia Abdel Ghaffar Khalafallah	2025-
Minister of Defence	Hassan Daoud Kayan	2025-
Minister of Digital Transformation and Communications	Ahmed al-Dirdiri Ghandour	2025-
Minister of Education	Al-Tohami Al-Zain Hajar	2025-
Ministry of Energy and Petroleum	Al-Mutasim Ibrahim	2025-
Minister of Federal Governance and Rural Development	Mohamed Kortekila Saleh	2025-
Minister of Foreign Affairs	Mohieldin Salim Ahmed Ibrahim	2025-
Minister of Finance and Economic Planning	Gibril Ibrahim	2025-
Minister of Health	Haitham Ibrahim	2026-
Minister of Higher Education	Ahmed Madawi	2025-
Minister of Human Resources and Social Welfare	Sulaima Ishaq (minister of state)	2025-
Minister of Industry and Trade	Mahasen Ali Yaqoub	2025-
Ministry of Interior	Babiker Samra Mustafa	2025-
Minister of Information	TBA	2025-
Ministry of Justice	Abdullah Mohamed Derf	2025-
Minister of Labor and Administrative Reform	TBA	2025-
Minister of Religious Affairs	Bashir Haroun Abdel Karim Abdullah	2025-
Ministry of Infrastructure and Transport	Saif al-Nasr al-Tijani Haroun	2025-
Minister of Youth and Sports	Ahmed Adam Ahmed	2025-
Minister of Animal Resources and Fisheries	Ahmed Al-Tijani Al-Mansouri	2025-

== See also ==
- Transitional Sovereignty Council
- Cabinet of Sudan
- Prime Minister of Sudan
- Government of Sudan
- Politics of Sudan
