= Osman Hussein government =

Government in Sudan (2022–2025)

- Date formed: 19 January 2022
- Date dissolved: 30 April 2025

People and organisations
- Head of state: Transitional Sovereignty Council
- Prime Minister: Osman Hussein
- Status in legislature: Transitional

History
- Predecessor: Abdalla Hamdok government
- Successor: Dafallah al-Haj Ali government

The Osman Hussein government was the cabinet of the Republic of the Sudan, led by acting prime minister Osman Hussein, which was appointed by the Transitional Sovereignty Council in January 2022 following the resignation of Abdalla Hamdok. Following Abdalla Hamdok's resignation, some members of the Abdalla Hamdok government were reappointed to the new cabinet, whilst others posts were assumed by civil servants. Plans for a new transitional cabinet were announced in February 2025. A rival Government of Peace and Unity was established in April 2025.

== Ministers ==
| Portfolio | Incumbent | Period |
|---|---|---|
| Prime Minister of Sudan | Osman Hussein | 2022–end |
| Minister of Defence | Yassin Ibrahim | 2022–end |
| Minister of Education | Mahmoud Sir Al-Khatam | 2022–2024 |
| Minister of Energy and Petroleum | Mohamed Abdallah Mahmoud | 2022–2023 |
| Minister of Energy and Petroleum | Mohieddin Naeem | 2023–end |
| Minister of Foreign Affairs | Ali Al-Sadiq Ali | 2022–2023 |
| Minister of Foreign Affairs | Hussein Awad Ali | 2023–2024 |
| Minister of Foreign Affairs | Ali Youssif | 2024–end |
| Minister of Finance and Economic Planning | Gibril Ibrahim | 2022-end |
| Minister of Industry | Batoul Abbas Awad | 2022–2023 |
| Minister of Industry | Mahasen Ali Yaqoub | 2023–end |
| Minister of Information | Graham Abdel Qader | 2022–2024 |
| Minister of Information | Khalid Ali Aleisir | 2024–end |
| Minister of the Interior | Khaled Hassan Mohieddin | 2022–2023 |
| Minister of the Interior | Khalil Pasha Sayrin | 2024–end |
| Minister of Justice | Mohamed Saeed Al-Hilu | 2022–2023 |
| Minister of Justice | Muawiya Osman Mohamed Khair | 2023–end |
| Minister of Labor and Administrative Reform | Souad Al-Tayeb | 2022–2023 |
| Minister of Labor and Administrative Reform | Ahmed Ali Abdel Rahman | 2023–end |
| Minister of Livestock and Fisheries | Abdel Hafiz Abdel Nabi | 2022–2023 |
| Minister of Religious Affairs | Abdel Atti Ahmed Abbas | 2022–2023 |
| Minister of Religious Affairs | Osama Hassan Mohamed Ahmed | 2023–2024 |
| Minister of Religious Affairs | Omar Bakhit | 2024–end |
| Minister of Trade | Al-Fateh Abdallah Youssif | 2023–2024 |
| Minister of Trade | Omar Banfir | 2024–end |
| Minister of Transport | Hisham Ahmed Ali Abu Zaid | 2022–2023 |
| Minister of Transport | Abubakr Abu Al-Qasim | 2023–end |

== See also ==
- Transitional Sovereignty Council
- Cabinet of Sudan
- Prime Minister of Sudan
- Government of Sudan
- Politics of Sudan
