= Dafallah al-Haj Ali government =

Government in Sudan (2025)

- Date formed: 30 April 2025
- Date dissolved: 31 May 2025

People and organisations
- Head of state: Transitional Sovereignty Council
- Prime Minister: Dafallah al-Haj Ali
- Status in legislature: Transitional

History
- Predecessor: Osman Hussein government
- Successor: Kamil Idris government

The Dafallah al-Haj Ali government was the cabinet of the Republic of Sudan, led by prime minister Dafallah al-Haj Ali between 30 April 2025 and 31 May 2025. The cabinet saw two new appointments: Al-Tahami al-Zein Hajar Mohamed was named Minister of Education following the death of his predecessor, Mahmoud Sir Al-Khatam, and Omar Mohamed Ahmed Siddig was appointed Minister of Foreign Affairs after the dismissal of Ali Youssi.

== Ministers ==
Portfolio	Incumbent	Period
Acting Prime Minister of Sudan	Dafallah al-Haj Ali	2025-end
Minister of Defence	Yassin Ibrahim	2025-end
Minister of Education	Al-Tahami al-Zein Hajar Mohamed	2025-end
Minister of Energy and Petroleum	Mohieddin Naeem	2025-end
Minister of Foreign Affairs	Omar Mohamed Ahmed Siddig	2025-end
Minister of Finance and Economic Planning	Gibril Ibrahim	2025-end
Minister of Industry	Mahasen Ali Yaqoub	2025-end
Minister of Information	Khalid Ali Aleisir	2025-end
Ministry of Interior	Khalil Pasha Sayreen	2025-end
Minister of Justice	Muawiya Osman Mohamed Khair	2025-end
Minister of Labor and Administrative Reform	Ahmed Ali Abdel Rahman	2025-end
Minister of Livestock and Fisheries	Abdel Hafiz Abdel Nabi	2025-end
Minister of Religious Affairs	Omar Bakhit	2025-end
Minister of Trade	Omar Banfir	2025-end
Minister of Transport	Abubakr Abu Al-Qasim	2025-end

== See also ==
- Transitional Sovereignty Council
- Cabinet of Sudan
- Prime Minister of Sudan
- Government of Sudan
- Politics of Sudan
