= Ministry of Industry and Trade (Sudan) =

Government ministry of Sudan

- وزارة الصناعة والتجارة

Ministry overview
- Jurisdiction: Government of Sudan
- Headquarters: Khartoum, Sudan
- Minister responsible: Mahasin Ali Yaqoub, Minister of Industry and Trade

The Ministry of Industry and Trade (Arabic: وزارة الصناعة والتجارة) is a government ministry of Sudan responsible for industrial and trade policy. The ministry forms part of the economic sector of the government of Sudan and is responsible for policies concerning industrial production, value-added manufacturing, exports and trade.

== History ==
Before the 2025 cabinet restructuring, Sudan had a separate trade portfolio called the Ministry of Trade and Supply (Arabic: وزارة التجارة والتموين) and, before that, the Ministry of Commerce (Arabic: وزارة التجارة), responsible for regulating imports and exports and promoting Sudanese exports. The current combined Ministry of Industry and Trade was included in the 22-ministry structure of the Government of Hope announced by Prime Minister Kamil Idris in June 2025. The restructuring combined the previously separate industry and trade portfolios. On 10 July 2025, Idris appointed Mahasin Ali Yaqoub as Minister of Industry and Trade. Yaqoub had previously worked in the ministry and had served as acting Minister of Industry from 2023.

== Responsibilities ==
The ministry's stated responsibilities include promoting integrated and value-added manufacturing and increasing Sudanese exports. Its activities also include industrial rehabilitation, management of strategic commodity supplies and the development of infrastructure for storage and food production.

The ministry has participated in the reconstruction of Sudan's industrial sector following damage caused by the civil war. In 2026, government programmes included the restoration of factories and proposals for integrated vegetable-oil, livestock-product and garment manufacturing projects.

The ministry is also involved in the digitalisation of Sudan's foreign-trade procedures. In December 2025, the government began processing export transactions electronically through the Baladna platform, linking the ministry with the Central Bank of Sudan, customs and other government agencies.

== See also ==
- Economy of Sudan
- Industry in Sudan
- Foreign trade of Sudan
- Government of Sudan
