= Ministry of Infrastructure and Transport (Sudan) =

Government ministry of Sudan

- وزارة البنى التحتية والنقل

Ministry overview
- Jurisdiction: Government of Sudan
- Headquarters: Khartoum
- Minister responsible: Saif al-Nasr al-Tijani Haroun, Minister of Infrastructure and Transport

The Ministry of Infrastructure and Transport (Arabic: وزارة البنى التحتية والنقل) is a government ministry of Sudan responsible for infrastructure and transport policy. Its portfolio includes the development and rehabilitation of roads, bridges, railways, seaports, river ports and dry ports.

In July 2025, Prime Minister Kamil Idris appointed Saif al-Nasr al-Tijani Haroun as Minister of Infrastructure and Transport during the formation of the Government of Hope.

== Responsibilities ==
The ministry oversees national transport infrastructure and participates in the planning, maintenance and rehabilitation of roads and bridges. In 2026, the Council of Ministers considered a ministry plan for the rehabilitation and development of national roads and bridges, including the Shambat, El Mek Nimr and Halfaya bridges in Khartoum. The programme was linked to the ministry's 2026–2030 strategic plan.

The ministry's transport portfolio also covers the railway and maritime sectors. The Sea Ports Corporation operates under the ministry, while the ministry works with the Sudan Railways Corporation on railway rehabilitation and restoration of services.

=== Reconstruction and transport projects ===
Following damage to Sudan's transport infrastructure during the war that began in 2023, the ministry has made rehabilitation of transport networks a major part of its activities. Its stated programme includes roads, bridges, railways, seaports, river ports and dry ports.

In July 2026, the ministry announced the reopening of the Khartoum–Wad Madani railway line after maintenance carried out by the Sudan Railways Corporation. Minister Haroun described the reopening as an initial step in a broader plan to restore railway services.

The ministry has also sought foreign participation in reconstruction projects. In January 2026, it held discussions with Saudi representatives concerning investment in railways, ports, logistics facilities and other transport infrastructure.

In June 2026, the Sea Ports Corporation and the state-owned Sudan Shipping Line signed an agreement to revive Sudan's national shipping fleet, with the ministry describing the project as part of efforts to rehabilitate the country's transport and productive sectors.

== See also ==
- Transport in Sudan
- Sudan Railways Corporation
- Sea Ports Corporation (Sudan)
- Government of Sudan
