= Ministry of Higher Education and Scientific Research (Sudan) =

Ministry in Sudan

- Arabic: وزارة التعليم العالي والبحث العلمي

Agency overview
- Formed: 1971
- Jurisdiction: Government of Sudan
- Headquarters: Al Baladia Street 2511, Khartoum
- Minister responsible: Ahmed Mudawi Musa
- Website: Official website

The Minister of Higher Education and Scientific Research (Arabic: وزارة التعليم العالي والبحث العلمي) is the government minister responsible for Sudan's national portfolio of higher education and scientific research, including national policy and planning for universities and other higher-education institutions, student admission policies, regulation of public and non-state higher-education institutions, academic standards, scientific research policy, and international academic cooperation. The minister heads the ministry and serves as chair of the country's National Council for Higher Education and Scientific Research.

The current minister is Professor Ahmed Mudawi Musa, who was appointed by Prime Minister Kamil Idris on 3 July 2025 as part of the formation of the Government of Hope.

== History and responsibilities ==
The ministry was established in 1971 with Ahmed Mohamed El Hassan as a minister during Gaafar Nimeiry's era, to formulate policies, plans, and programs for higher education and scientific research and to coordinate the activities of higher-education institutions.

According to the ministry's historical account, Sudanese higher education developed from institutions including the Scientific Institute established in 1912 and the Kitchener School of Medicine established in 1924. The higher-education system subsequently expanded to include public and private universities, colleges and specialised research institutes. The administration of the sector was later organised under the Ministry of Higher Education and Scientific Research. Higher-education institutions retain scientific, administrative and financial autonomy under their individual establishing legislation. At the same time, national policy and coordination are exercised through the ministry and the National Council for Higher Education and Scientific Research.

During the 2018–2019 Sudanese protests, al-Mahdi announced the suspension of studies at higher-education institutions in Khartoum State in December 2018 following widespread demonstrations.

During the COVID-19 pandemic in Sudan and in March 2020, the minister Saghayroun ordered the temporary suspension of teaching and academic activities at public and non-governmental higher-education institutions as part of the government's response to the pandemic.

The current war caused extensive disruption to university infrastructure, displaced students and academic staff, and forced institutions to use alternative campuses, temporary centres and remote teaching arrangements. During the conflict, the ministry operated temporarily from Port Sudan.

Following the recapture of much of Khartoum by the Sudanese Armed Forces in 2025, the ministry began transferring administrative operations back to the capital and encouraging universities to return to their original campuses after rehabilitation. Under both Mohamed Hassan Dahab and Ahmed Mudawi Musa, maintaining academic continuity, accommodating displaced students and restoring damaged university facilities became major responsibilities of the portfolio.

In 2026, the ministry also discussed introducing artificial-intelligence-related study tracks into university curricula and reforms to the employment conditions and salaries of university academic staff.

=== National Council for Higher Education and Scientific Research ===
The minister serves as chair of the National Council for Higher Education and Scientific Research. The council includes vice-chancellors and governing-board representatives of public and private universities, representatives of relevant government ministries, specialists in higher education and scientific research, and the ministry's senior administration.

The council's functions include formulating national higher-education and research policy, determining admission policies and student numbers, approving admission results, establishing minimum qualifications for academic and research staff, regulating the establishment of private and foreign higher-education institutions, and evaluating the performance of higher-education and research institutions. The council is supported by specialised scientific committees covering fields including engineering, medicine, agriculture and veterinary science, basic sciences, computer science, humanities, law and Islamic studies, education, economics and social sciences, and scientific research.

== Ministers ==
Minister	Took office	Left office	Government
Ahmed Mohamed El Hassan	1971	1972	Gaafar Nimeiry government
El Sheikh Mahgoub Gaafar	1988	1989	Al Mahdi government
Ibrahim Ahmed Omer	1990	1996	Omar al-Bashir government
Ibrahim Ahmed Omer	2 December 1996	24 January 2000	Omar al-Bashir government
El Zubair Bashir Taha	24 January 2000	23 February 2001	Omar al-Bashir government
Mubarak Muhammad Ali al-Majdhub	23 February 2001	21 September 2005	Omar al-Bashir government
Peter Nyot Kok	21 September 2005	26 December 2007	Omar al-Bashir government
Abd-al-Rahman Sa’id Abd-al Rahman	26 December 2007	13 February 2008	Omar al-Bashir government
Peter Adwok Nyaba	14 September 2008	27 December 2011	Omar al-Bashir government
Khamis Kajou Kunda	27 December 2011	8 December 2013	Omar al-Bashir government
Sumaya Abu Kashawa	8 December 2013	9 September 2018	Omar al-Bashir government
Al-Sadiq al-Hadi al-Mahdi	9 September 2018	13 March 2019	Omar al-Bashir government
Suhair Ahmed Salah	13 March 2019	11 April 2019	TMC transitional government
Intisar el-Zein Saghayroun	8 September 2019	19 January 2022	Abdalla Hamdok government
Mohamed Hassan Dahab Ahmed (acting)	1 February 2022	3 July 2025	Osman Hussein government
Ahmed Mudawi Musa	3 July 2025	Incumbent	Government of Hope
