= Ministry of Public Works and Transport =

Ministry of Public Works and Transport may refer to:

- Ministry of Public Works and Transport (Bahamas)
- Ministry of Public Works and Transport (Cambodia)
- Minister of Public Works and Transport (Hungary) (1848-1889)
- Ministry of Public Works and Transport (Laos)
- Ministry of Public Works and Transport (Lebanon)
- Ministry of Public Works and Transport (Spain)

== See also ==
- List of public works ministries
- List of ministries of transport
