= List of ministries of transport =

A ministry of transport or transportation is a ministry responsible for transportation within a country. It usually is administered by the minister for transport. The term is also sometimes applied to the departments or other government agencies administering transport in nations who do not employ ministers.

Specific responsibilities may include overseeing road safety, civil aviation, maritime transport, rail transport, developing government transportation policy, organizing public transport, and the maintenance and construction of infrastructural projects. Some ministries have additional responsibilities in related policy areas such as infrastructure, public works, waterworks, construction, communication, housing and economic activities, such as industry and trade.

In many jurisdictions, transportation policy is often assumed by an infrastructure ministry.

== Country-related articles and lists ==
Country		Position	Office
Albania		Minister of Infrastructure and Energy	Ministry of Infrastructure and Energy
Algeria		Minister of Public Works and Transport	Ministry of Public Works and Transport
Angola		Minister of Transport	
Australia	Commonwealth	Minister for Infrastructure, Transport, Regional Development and Local Government	Department of Infrastructure, Transport, Regional Development, Communications and the Arts
Australia	New South Wales	Minister for Transport	Transport for NSW
Australia	Queensland	Minister for Transport	Department of Transport & Main Roads
Australia	(Victoria (state)) Victoria	Minister for Transport Infrastructure	Department of Transport & Planning
Australia	Western Australia	Minister for Transport	Department of Transport & Major Infrastructure
Australia	Tasmania	Minister for Transport	Building Tasmania
Australia	(Tasmania) South Australia	Minister for Infrastructure and Transport	Department for Infrastructure & Transport
Australia	Northern Territory	Minister for infrastructure, Planning and Logistics	Department of Infrastructure, Planning & Logistics
Australia	Australian Capital Territory	Minister for Transport	City and Environment Directorate
Austria		Minister of Transport	Ministry of Transport
Azerbaijan		Minister of Communications & Information Technologies	Ministry of Transport, Communications and High Technologies
Bahamas		Minister of Public Works and Transport	Ministry of Public Works and Transport
Bangladesh		Minister of Railways	Ministry of Railways
Bangladesh		Minister of Road Transport and Bridge	Ministry of Road Transport and Bridge
Bangladesh		Minister of Shipping	Ministry of Shipping
Bangladesh		Minister of Civil Aviation and Tourism	Ministry of Civil Aviation and Tourism
Bahrain		Minister of Transportation	Ministry of Transportation
Belgium	federal	Secretary of State for Mobility	
Belgium	Brussels	Brussels Minister of Transport	
Belgium	Flanders	Flemish Minister for Mobility	
Belgium	Wallonia	Walloon Minister of Mobility	
Bosnia and Herzegovina	Council of Ministers	Minister of Communications and Transport	Ministry of Communications and Transport
Bosnia and Herzegovina	Federation of Bosnia and Herzegovina	Federal Minister of Transport and Communications	Federal Ministry of Transport and Communications
Bosnia and Herzegovina	Republika Srpska	Minister of Transport and Communications	Ministry of Transport and Communications
Brazil		Minister of Transport	Ministry of Infrastructure
Brazil		Minister of Ports and Airports	Ministry of Ports and Airports
Canada	Federal Government	Minister of Transport	Transport Canada
Canada	Alberta	Minister of Transportation and Economic Corridors	Ministry of Transportation and Economic Corridors
Canada	British Columbia	Minister of Transportation and Infrastructure	Ministry of Transportation and Infrastructure
Canada	Manitoba	Minister of Transportation and Infrastructure	Department of Infrastructure and Transportation
Canada	New Brunswick	Minister of Transportation	Department of Transportation and Infrastructure
Canada	Newfoundland and Labrador	Minister of Transportation and Works	Department of Transportation and Works
Canada	Northwest Territories	Minister of Infrastructure (Northwest Territories)	Department of Infrastructure
Canada	Nova Scotia	Minister of Public Works	Department of Public Works
Canada	Nunavut	Minister of Economic Development and Transportation	Department of Economic Development and Transportation
Canada	Ontario	Minister of Transportation	Ministry of Transportation
Canada	Prince Edward Island	Minister of Transportation and Infrastructure	Department of Transportation and Infrastructure
Canada	Quebec	Minister of Transport and Sustainable Mobility	Transports Québec
Canada	Saskatchewan	Minister of Highways	Ministry of Highways
Canada	Yukon	Minister of Highways and Public Works	Department of Highways and Public Works
China	Mainland	Minister of Transport	Ministry of Transport
China	Hong Kong	Secretary for Transport and Logistics	Transport and Logistics Bureau
China	Macau	Secretary for Transportation and Public Works	Secretariat for Transport and Public Works
Colombia		Minister of Transport	Ministry of Transport
Croatia		Minister of the Sea, Transport and Infrastructure	Ministry of the Sea, Transport and Infrastructure
Cuba		Minister of Transport	Ministry of Transport
Denmark		Minister of Transport	Ministry of Transport
Egypt		Minister of Transport	
Ethiopia			Ministry of Transport and Communication
European Union		European Commissioner for Transport	Directorate-General for Mobility and Transport (European Commission)
Fiji		Minister for Transport	
Finland		Minister of Transport	
France		Minister of Transport	Ministry of Ecology, Sustainable Development and Energy
Germany		Federal Minister for Digital and Transport	Federal Ministry for Digital and Transport
Ghana			Minister of Transport
Greece		Minister for Infrastructure, Transport and Networks	Ministry of Infrastructure, Transport and Networks
Hungary		Minister of Construction and Transport	Ministry of Construction and Transport
Iceland		Minister of Transport and Infrastructure	Department of Transport and Infrastructure
India		Union Cabinet Minister of Railways	Ministry of Railways
India		Union Cabinet Minister of Road Transport and Highways	Ministry of Road Transport and Highways
India		Union Cabinet Minister of Shipping	Ministry of Shipping
India		Union Cabinet Minister of Civil Aviation	Ministry of Civil Aviation
India		Minister for Transport (Kerala State)	Department of Transport (Kerala)
India		Minister for Transport (Tamil Nadu)	Department of Transport (Tamil Nadu)
India		Minister for Transport (West Bengal State)	Department of Transport (West Bengal)
India		Minister for Transport (Jharkhand State)	Department of Transport (Jharkhand)
India		Minister for Transport (Maharashtra State)	Ministry of Transport (Maharashtra)
Indonesia		Minister of Transportation	Ministry of Transportation
Iran		Minister of Roads and Urban Development	Ministry of Roads and Urban Development
Iraq		Minister of Transport	Ministry of Transport
Ireland		Minister for Transport	Department of Transport
Isle of Man		Minister for Infrastructure	Department of Infrastructure
Israel		Transportation Minister	Ministry of Transport and Road Safety
Italy		Minister of Transports	
Ivory Coast		Minister of Transport	Ministry of Transport
Jamaica		Minister of Housing, Transport and Works	Ministry of Housing, Transport and Works
Japan		Minister of Land, Infrastructure, Transport and Tourism	Ministry of Land, Infrastructure, Transport and Tourism
Jordan		Transport Minister	
Kazakhstan		Minister of Transportation	
Republic of Korea			Ministry of Land, Infrastructure and Transport
Kosovo		Minister of Transport and Communications	Ministry of Transport and Communications
Latvia		Minister of Transport	Ministry of Transport
Lithuania		Minister of Transport and Communications	Ministry of Transport and Communications
Luxembourg		Minister for Transport	
Morocco			Ministry of Equipment and Transport
Malaysia		Minister of Transport	Ministry of Transport
Maldives		Minister of Transport	Ministry of Transport and Civil Aviation
Mexico		Secretary of Communications and Transport	Secretariat of Communications and Transport
Myanmar			Ministry of Transport
Nepal		Minister of Physical Infrastructure and Transport	Ministry of Physical Infrastructure and Transport
Netherlands		Minister of Infrastructure and Water Management	Ministry of Infrastructure and Water Management
New Zealand		Minister of Transport	Ministry of Transport
Nicaragua		Minister of Transportation and Infrastructure	Ministry of Transportation and Infrastructure
Nigeria		Minister of Transportation	Ministry of Transportation of Nigeria
North Macedonia		Ministry of Transport and Communications	Ministry of Transport and Communications
Norway		Minister of Transport and Communications	Ministry of Transport and Communications
Peru		Minister of Transportation and Communications	
Philippines		Secretary of Transportation	Department of Transportation
Romania			Ministry of Transport
Russia		Minister of Transport	Ministry of Transport
Rwanda		Minister for Transport	
Saudi Arabia		Minister of Transport	Ministry of Transport
Sierra Leone		Minister of Transport	
Singapore		Minister for Transport	Ministry of Transport
Slovakia		Minister of Transport and Construction	Ministry of Transport and Construction
Somalia		Minister of Transport and Civil Aviation	Ministry of Transport and Civil Aviation
South Africa		Minister of Transport	Department of Transport
Sri Lanka		Minister of Transport	Ministry of Transport
Sudan		Ministry of Infrastructure and Transport	Ministry of Infrastructure and Transport
Sweden		Minister of Infrastructure	Ministry of Enterprise, Energy and Communications
Switzerland		Minister for Environment, Transport, Energy and Communications	Federal Department of Environment, Transport, Energy and Communications
Syria			Ministry of Transport
Republic of China (Taiwan)		Minister of Transportation and Communications	Ministry of Transportation and Communications
Tajikistan		Minister of Transport	Ministry of Transport
Tanzania		Minister of Transport	Ministry of Transport
Thailand		Minister of Transport	Ministry of Transport
Timor-Leste		Minister of Transport and Communications	Ministry of Transport and Communications
Trinidad and Tobago		Minister of Transport	Ministry of Transport of Trinidad & Tobago
Turkey		Minister of Transport and Infrastructure	Ministry of Transport and Infrastructure
Ukraine		Minister of Infrastructure	Ministry of Infrastructure
United Kingdom	Non-devolved reserved matters	Secretary of State for Transport	Department for Transport
United Kingdom	England	Secretary of State for Transport	Department for Transport
United Kingdom	Scotland	Cabinet Secretary for Transport, Infrastructure and Connectivity	Scottish Government, Transport Scotland
United Kingdom	Wales	Cabinet Secretary for Transport	Welsh Government, Transport for Wales
United Kingdom	Northern Ireland	Minister for Infrastructure	Department for Infrastructure
United States	Federal Government	Secretary of Transportation	Department of Transportation
Vietnam		Minister of Transport	Ministry of Transport
Zimbabwe		Minister of Transport and Infrastructural Development	Ministry of Transport and Infrastructural Development (Zimbabwe)

== See also ==
- Department of Transportation
