= Ministry of Animal Resources and Fisheries =

Ministry of Animal Resources and Fisheries may refer to

- Ministry of Animal Resources and Fisheries (Sudan)
- Ministry of Animal Resources and Fisheries (South Sudan)
- Ministry of Livestock, Agriculture, and Fisheries (Uruguay)

== See also ==
- Ministry of Livestock
- Ministry of Livestock and Fisheries
