= Ministry of Livestock =

Ministry of Livestock may refer to

- Ministry of Livestock (Somaliland)
- Ministry of Livestock and Animal Husbandry (Puntland)
- Ministry of Livestock and Fisheries (Tanzania)
- Ministry of Livestock, Fisheries and Rural Development (Myanmar)
- Ministry of Livestock and Rural Community Development (Sri Lanka)
- Ministry of Livestock, Agriculture, and Fisheries (Uruguay)

== See also ==
- Ministry of Livestock and Fisheries
- Ministry of Animal Resources and Fisheries
