= Abdullah Mohamed Darf =

Sudanese Politician

Minister of Ministry of Justice (Sudan)
- Assuming office 2025
- Appointed by: Kamil Idris
- Succeeding: Muawiya Osman Muhammad Khair

Personal details
- Education: University of Khartoum

Abdullah Mohammed Daraf Ali is a Sudanese politician and the current Minister of Justice of Sudan.

== Early life and education ==
Daraf was born in Khashm El-Girba, Kassala State, in the eastern part of Sudan. He received his primary education in Hashm El-Girba and his secondary education in Kassala city. He obtained his bachelor's degree in Law from the University of Khartoum

== Career ==
Daraf worked at the Sudan Public Prosecution Office between 1995 and 2004. In 2005, he was appointed as the Chairman of the Legislation Committee in Kassala with the rank of Minister. In 2012, he was appointed as the Minister of Health in Kassala State and in 2025, he was appointed as the Minister of Justice of the Federal Republic of Sudan.
