= Transport in Tajikistan =

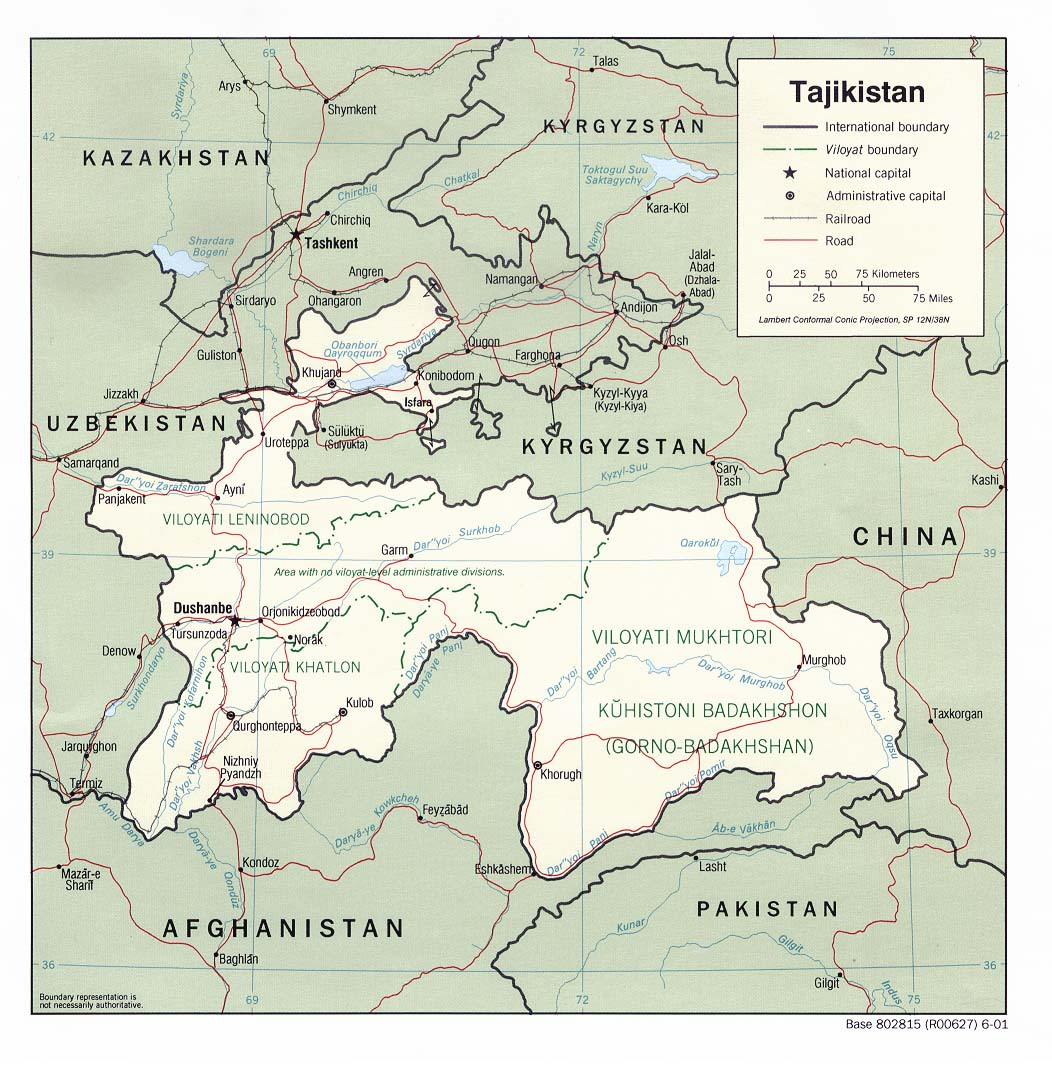
2001 map of Tajikistan including road and rail network

Most of rugged Tajikistan's transportation system was built during the Soviet era, and since that time the system has deteriorated badly because of insufficient investment and maintenance. In 2013, Tajikistan, like many of the other Central Asian countries, was experiencing major development in its transportation sector. Beginning in 2005, a series of major transportation projects begun. The first such project, the Anzob Tunnel, was inaugurated in 2006, providing a year-round road link from Dushanbe to northern Tajikistan.

== Airports ==
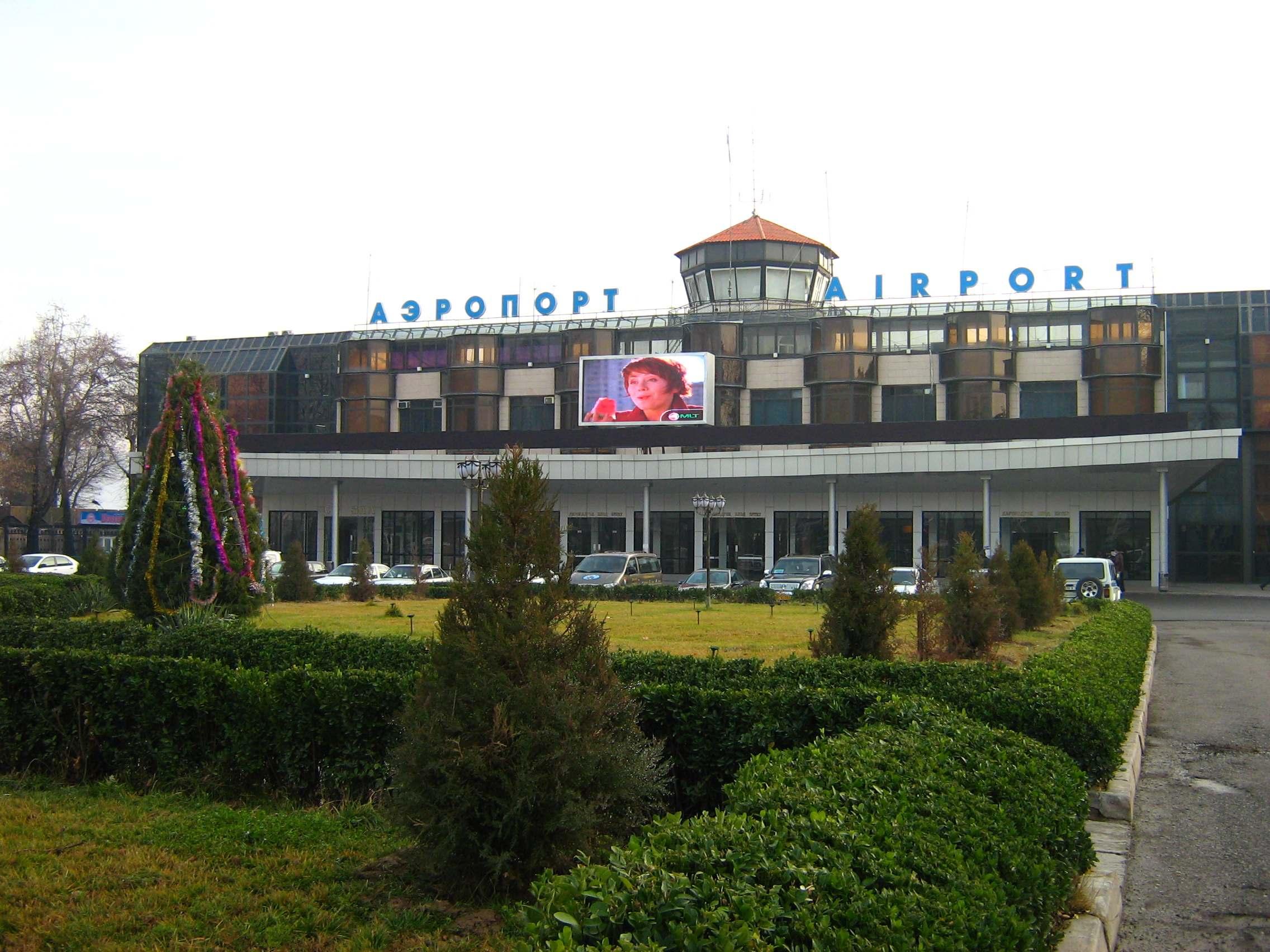
Dushanbe International Airport

In 2009 Tajikistan had 26 airports, 18 of which had paved runways, of which two had runways longer than 3,000 meters. Tajikistan has two domestic airlines (Tajik Air and Somon Air) and is also serviced by foreign air companies (mainly Russian). The country's main airport is Dushanbe International Airport which, as of May 2014, had regularly scheduled flights to such major cities as Almaty, Baku, Bishkek, Delhi, Dubai, Frankfurt, Istanbul, Kabul, Moscow, Saint Petersburg, Sharjah, Tehran, and Ürümqi among others.

No flights connect Dushanbe with Tashkent. The next largest airports behind Dushanbe are at Khujand and Kulob. As of 2007 air transport was said to be unreliable.

== Railways ==
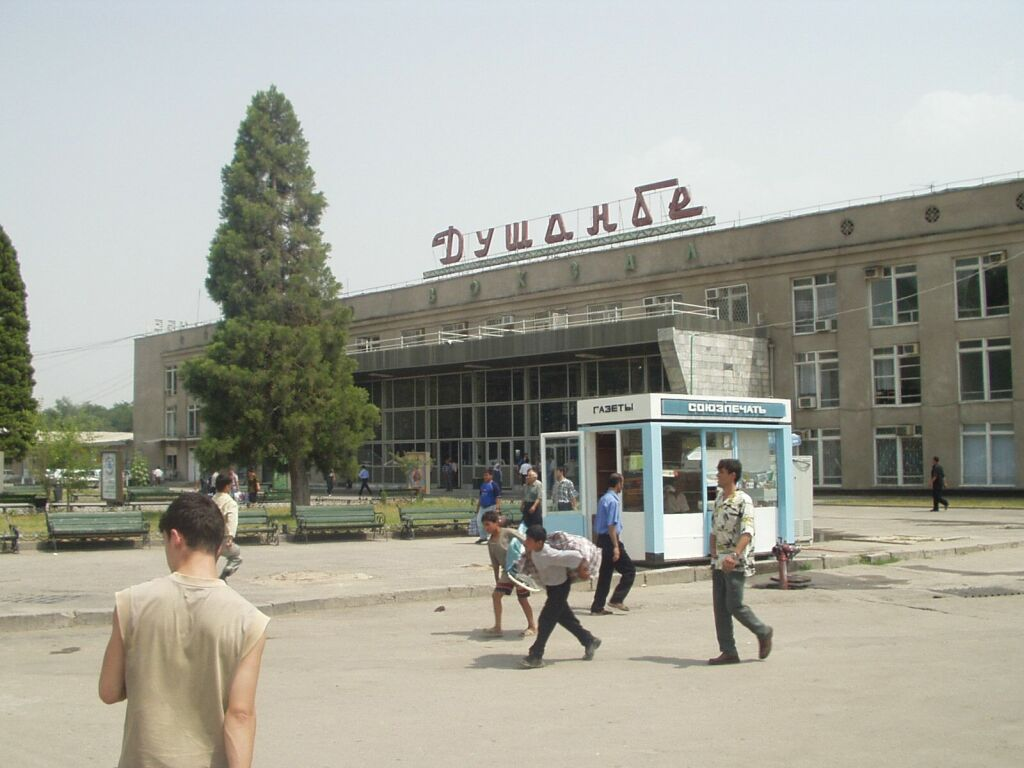
Dushanbe railway station

The railroad system totals only 680 kilometres (420 mi) of track, all of it 1,520 mm (4 ft 11 27/32 in) broad gauge. The principle segments are in the southwestern region and connect the capital with the industrial areas of the Gissar and Vakhsh valleys and with Uzbekistan, Turkmenistan, Kazakhstan and Russia. In 2000 a new line, the Bokhtar – Kulyab railway, was completed and connected the Kulyab District with the central area of the country. Passenger transit through Tajikistan has been hindered by periodic failures of Tajik Railways to pay transit tariffs and by safety issues. Most international freight traffic is carried by train.

It is hoped that a 2009 agreement between the heads of state of Pakistan, Tajikistan, and Afghanistan will modernize parts of Tajikistan's rail system to allow more trade between Central Asian countries.

== Highways ==
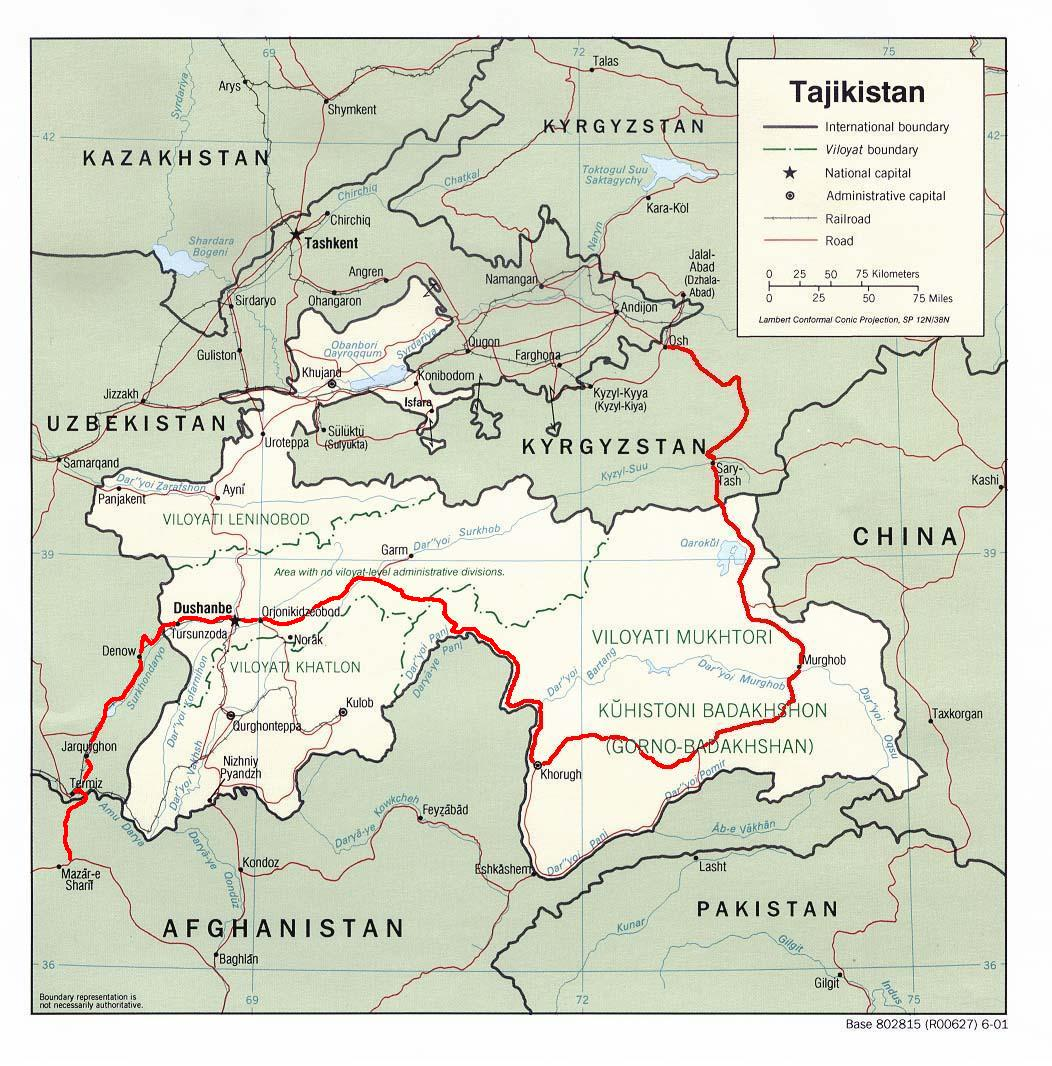
Pamir Highway Route

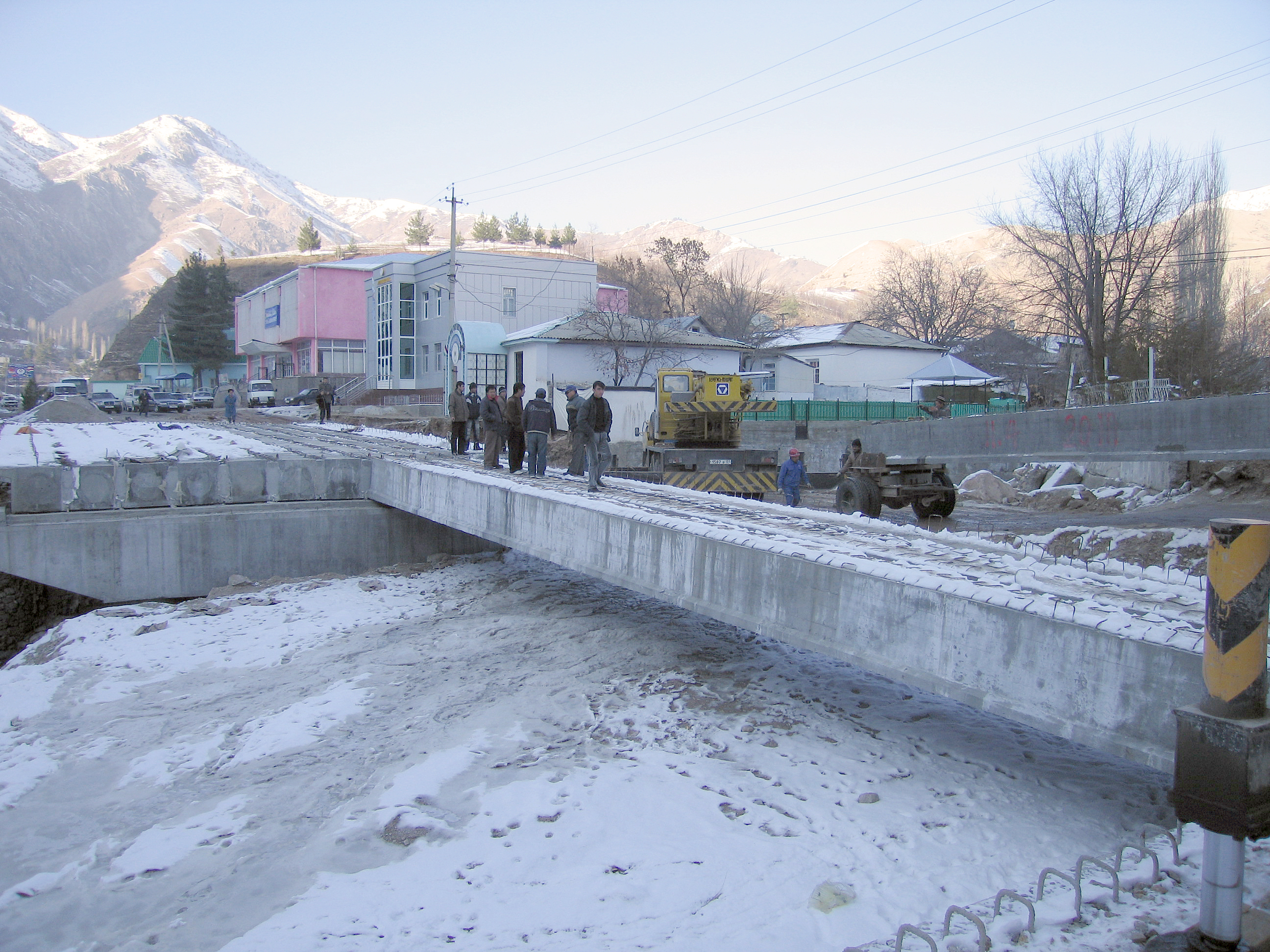
Chinese workers build a bridge on the road between Dushanbe and Khujand, 2007

The total length of roads in the country is 27,800 kilometers, nearly all of which were built before 1991. Automobiles account for more than 90% of the total volume of passenger transportation and more than 80% of domestic freight transportation.

As of 2014 many highway and tunnel construction projects were underway or recently completed. Major projects include rehabilitation of the Dushanbe – Chanak (Uzbek border), Dushanbe – Kulma (Chinese border), Kurgan-Tube – Nizhny Pyanj (Afghan border) highways and construction of tunnels under the mountain passes of Anzob, Shakhristan, Shar-Shar and Chormazak. These were supported by international donor countries. China has invested approximately $720 million for infrastructure improvements in Tajikistan, including the rebuilding, widening and improvement of the road between Dushanbe and Khujand which as of August 2007 is proceeding using equipment, labor, and oversight from China.

In mid-2005 construction began on a bridge across the Panj River to Afghanistan which was funded by the United States and opened in August 2007 and plans called for construction of several other bridges ultimately connecting Tajikistan to warm-water ports to the south.

The Pakistan-Afghanistan-Tajikistan Highway, a new 1,300 kilometres (810 mi) long road is planned to pass through the Gorno-Badakhshan Autonomous Province and Dushanbe and in 2013 Tajikistan announced that all road construction on its side of the border had been completed. According to President Zardari of Pakistan,

... [the] opening up of road links [is] critical to bringing the countries of the region closer together and for increasing trade and people to people contacts for the economic and social benefits of all countries.

== Pipelines ==
Tajikistan's 549 kilometers of gas pipeline bring natural gas from Uzbekistan to Dushanbe and transport gas between points in Uzbekistan across northwestern Tajikistan. Tajikistan also has 38 kilometers of oil pipeline.

== Ports and waterways ==
Tajikistan has no access to the sea and no navigable inland waterways.

== See also ==
- Ministry of Transport (Tajikistan)
