= National Centre for Research (Sudan) =

National Centre for Research in Sudan

- المركز القومي للبحوث

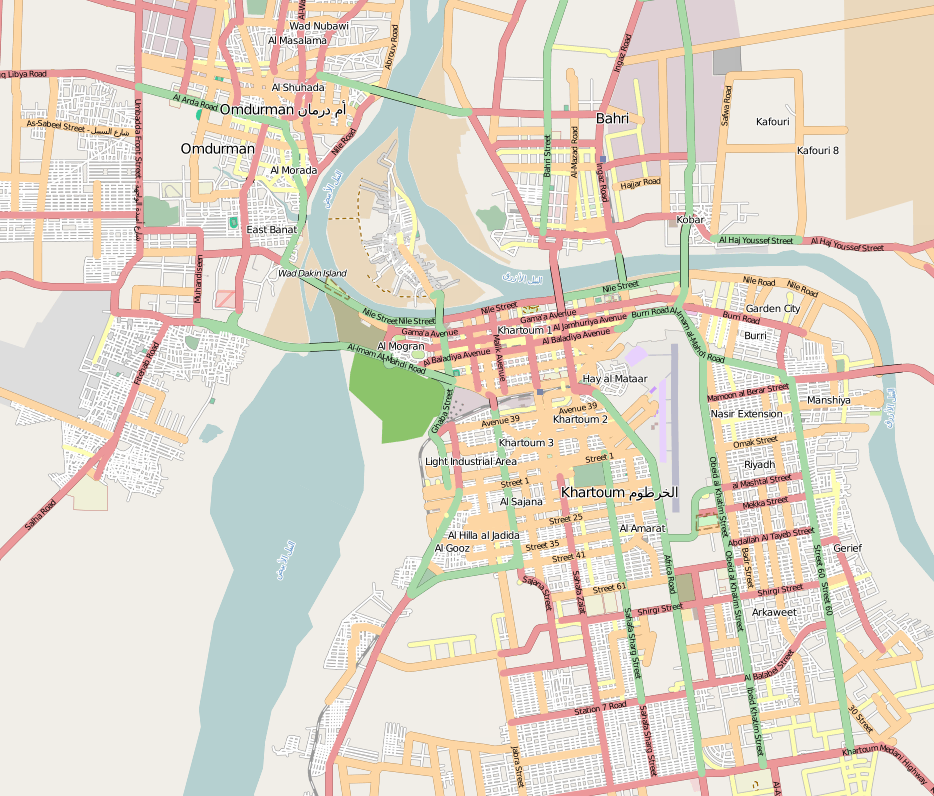
- Abbreviation: NCR
- Predecessor: National Council for Research (1970–1991)
- Formation: 1991; 35 years ago
- Headquarters: El Mek Nimir Avenue, Khartoum
- Location: Khartoum, Sudan
- Coordinates: 15°30′32″N 32°32′50″E
- Editor-in-Chief: Abdalla Abdelrahim Satti
- Parent organization: Ministry of Higher Education and Scientific Research
- Staff: +580
- Website: ncr.gov.sd

The National Centre for Research (NCR) (Arabic: المركز القومي للبحوث, romanized: Markaz al-Qawmī lil-Buḥūth) is a research institution in Sudan that was established in 1991, to succeed the National Council for Research which was established in 1970. It operates under the Ministry of Higher Education and Scientific Research and holds a status similar to that of universities within the country. The NCR’s primary role is to carry out scientific and applied research that contributes to the economic and social development of Sudan.

The NCR is composed of various research institutes, each specialising in different fields such as renewable energy, technology, environment and natural resources, medicinal and aromatic Plants, tropical medicine, and economic and social studies. The research work is conducted by a team of around 180 researchers, supported by approximately 100 technicians and about 300 administrative staff. The NCR published 555 papers between 1993 and 2015.

The NCR has established research collaborations with national and international institutes and has adopted a successful partnership policy. It also welcomes foreign scientists who are interested in conducting research in Sudan.
