= Ministry of Energy and Petroleum =

Ministry of Energy and Petroleum could refer to:

- Ministry of Energy and Petroleum (Ghana)
- Ministry of Energy and Petroleum (Sudan)
