= Abdelmahmood Abdelhaleem =

Sudanese diplomat

Abdelmahmood Abdelhaleem Mohamad
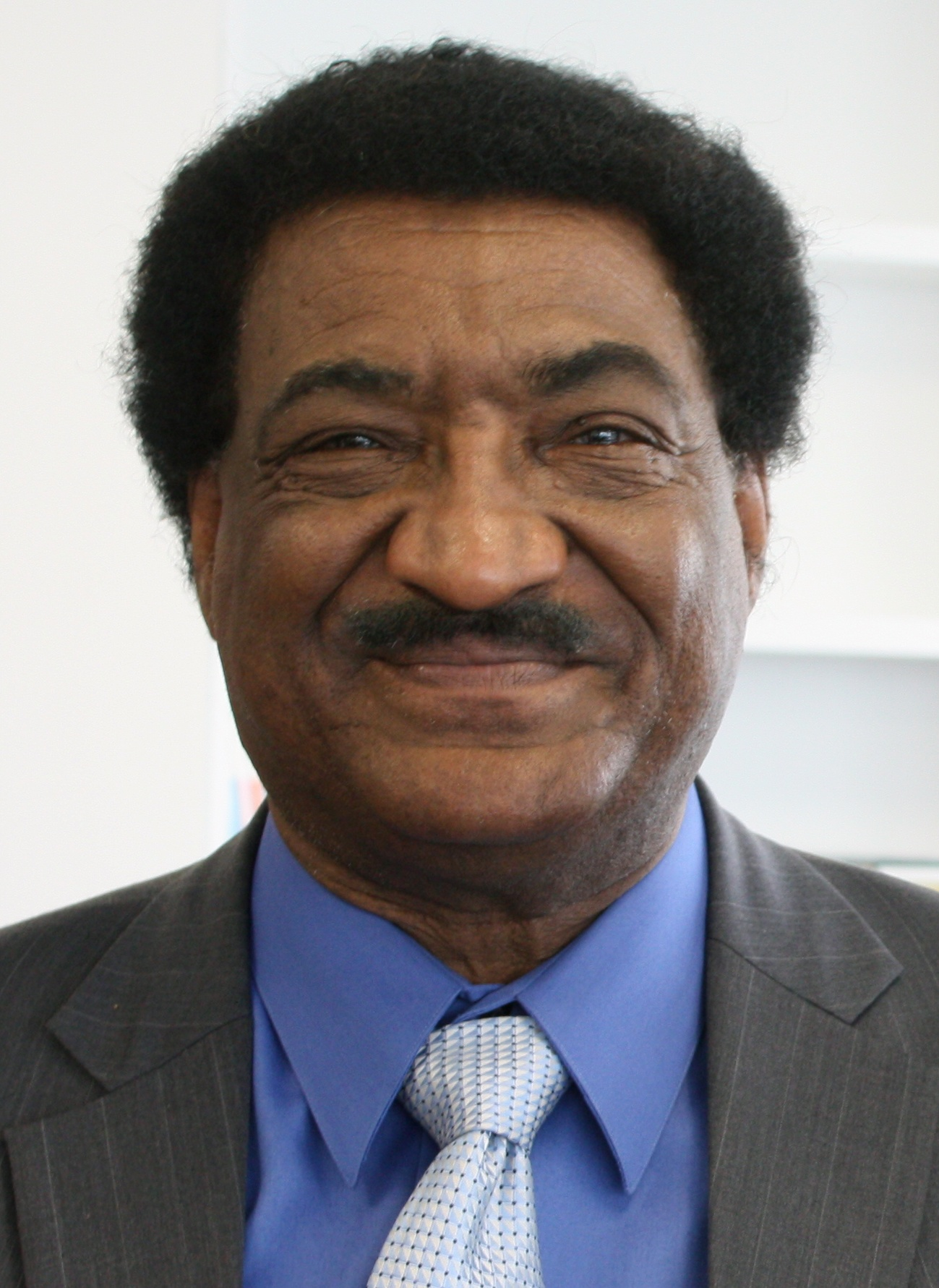
- Abdelmahmood Abdelhaleem in 2009

Ambassador of Sudan to the United Nations
- In office 14 September 2006 – 13 August 2010
- President: Omer al-Bashir
- Preceded by: Elfatih Erwa
- Succeeded by: Daffa-Alla Elhag Ali Osman

Personal details
- Education: University of Khartoum, Ohio University
- Occupation: Diplomat

Abdelmahmood Abdelhaleem Mohamad is a Sudanese diplomat. From September 2006 to August 2010, Abdelhaleem was his country's ambassador to the United Nations.

== Career ==
Abdelhaleem began his career in the Sudanese Foreign Ministry in 1975 after receiving his Bachelor of Science degree in political science from the University of Khartoum. In 1978, he received a master's degree in international relations from Ohio University. He has served across Africa and the Greater Middle East for Sudan, including Saudi Arabia (1987–1989), Ethiopia (1990–1995), Somalia (1994) and Afghanistan (2003).

== On Darfur ==
In an interview in a report on the Darfur genocide by PBS's Frontline, he said, "We are a developing country, we have our shortcomings. But we are unfairly treated. The issue of Darfur has been blown out of proportion."
