= Ali Muhammad Uthman Yasin =

Former Sudan Minister of Justice

- علي محمد عثمان ياسين

Minister of Justice
- In office 1998–2005
- President: Omar al-Bashir
- Succeeded by: Mohamed Ali Al-Mardi

Personal details
- Party: National Islamic Front

Ali Muhammad Uthman Yasin (Arabic: علي محمد عثمان ياسين, romanized: Ali Muhammad Uthman Yasin) is a Sudanese politician, diplomat, and lawyer. He served as the Minister of Justice of Sudan from 1998 to 2005.

== Career ==
Yasin began his career in diplomacy as Under Secretary in the Ministry of Foreign Affairs in 1991. He subsequently served as Sudan's Ambassador to the United Kingdom until 1994, followed by his appointment as Permanent Representative to the United Nations from 1994 to 1996. He was the Minister of Justice from 1998 - 2005. During his tenure, he represented Sudan at international forums, including defending the government's record at the 2001 World Conference against Racism in Durban, South Africa.

Yasin was vocal in denying allegations of ethnic cleansing in Darfur. He described the reports as exaggerated and influenced by biased sources. In 2004, he rejected calls for a UN human rights observer in Sudan and asserted that such measures were unwarranted. He also addressed the expulsion of Hamas from Sudan in 2003 and dismissed any security threats arising from the decision.

Yasin announced the detention of 14 individuals which included members of the army, security, and police forces, for abuses in South Darfur in 2005. In the same year, he revealed that legal complaints had been filed against high-ranking officials in special courts for Darfur crimes. He also oversaw investigations into banking irregularities and student deaths related to compulsory military service in 2000.
