= Omer al-Qarray =

Omar Ahmed al-Qarai (Arabic: عمر أحمد القراي), best known as Omer al-Qarray, is a Sudanese journalist and was the director of the Curriculum Center who resigned after being at the centre of controversy because of the new Sudanese curriculum.

== Early life and education ==
Omar Ahmed al-Qarai was born in the city of Atbara in northern Sudan. Al-Qarai graduated from the Faculty of Economic and Social Studies, University of Khartoum, in 1977. He later joined the Republican Brotherhood party. He obtained a master's degree in agricultural economics from the University of Khartoum and another master's degree in international studies from Ohio University, US.

Al-Qarai received his PhD from Ohio University in Education, majoring in Curriculum Science. The title of his doctoral dissertation was “Problems and Prospects for Human Rights Education in the Arab-Islamic World - Egypt as a Case Study” and he obtained it in 2000.

Al-Qarai studied the Arabic language at (Defense Lagoch Institute) Monterey, United States, from 2002 to 2005, and from 2002 to 2002 he studied theories of education and the social foundations of education at Ohio University.

== Career ==
Al-Qarai worked as an employee at the Civil Savings Bank from 1986 to 1991. He worked as a professor at the Higher Technical Institute, Misrata - Libya, from 1991 to 1994. He worked as a researcher at the Cairo Institute for Human Rights Studies from 1994 to 1996. He worked as a researcher in the Department of Sociology at the University of Minnesota from 1996 to 1997. He taught Arabic to students at Ohio University from 1998 to 1999.

Al-Qarai worked as a lecturer at the American University in the Emirates from January 2012 to July 2012. He worked from 2009 to 2012 as a consultant for a company in the information technology field and as a consultant for civil society organisations in Sudan.

Al-Qarai worked as an associate professor at Ahfad University for Women and taught master's students at the Institute for Women and Gender Studies. He also worked in international organisations and cooperated with studies, research centres, and women's organisations inside and outside Sudan. He works as a special consultant in the field of education, women and human rights.

Al-Qarai taught at Gulf universities, and the last university he worked at was Dhofar University, College of Arts and Applied Sciences, where he worked from September 2017 to August 2019, and worked as a lecturer at the College of Communication, Sociology Division, Ajman University of Science and Technology from 2013 to 2017.

=== Curriculum management ===
Al-Qarai was chosen as director of the National Center for Curriculum to reform the educational process came after 30 years of the rule of the National Congress Party and Sudanese Revolution, in the government of Abdullah Hamdouk within the transitional cabinet. He was selected by Mohamed El-Amin Ahmed El-Tom due to his speciality in education and its foundations.

A fierce battle ensued involving politicians, clerics, and journalists over proposals to change the school curricula, when a new history book for the sixth grade was leaked. It sparked controversy over the painting "The Creation of Adam" by Renaissance artist Michelangelo. The crisis was exacerbated by the circulation of a video clip of the imam of the mosque, Muhammad Al-Amin Ismail, crying on the Friday's Khutbah, regretting what was stated in the new curricula, before attacking Al-Qarai fiercely. Omar Al-Qarai blamed the Minister of Religious Affairs and Endowments, Nasr al-Din Mufreh, for his silence even when some clerics called for his death. Al-Qari had insisted that he would not step down unless a decision were taken to cancel the curricula in response to pressure.

However, he resigned on 7 January after Hamdok withdrew the new curriculum until it was reviewed and approved.

== See also ==
- Republican Brotherhood
- Mahmoud Mohamed Taha
- Sovereignty Council of Sudan
