= Cabinet of Sudan =

Executive body of Sudan

The Cabinet of Sudan usually refers to the chief executive body of the Republic of the Sudan.

The constitutional cabinet was dissolved following the 11 April 2019 Sudanese coup d'état. In August 2019, a transitional government was formed with Abdalla Hamdok as prime minister, and 20 Ministers in the transitional cabinet, during the 39-month democratic transition. Ministers of the transitional cabinet are ineligible to run in the election scheduled to follow the transition period. In October 2021, the transitional government was dissolved following the 2021 Sudanese coup d'état. A civil war broke out between rival factions within the armed forces in April 2023. Since February 2025, members of the cabinet serve as ex officio members of Sudan's Transitional Legislative Authority.

== Ministries ==
Ministries include:

- Defense
- Education
- Energy and Petroleum
- Finance
- Foreign Affairs
- Information
- Justice
- Interior
- Health

== Current cabinet ==
Kamil Idriss was named prime minister by the Transitional Sovereignty Council on 19 May 2025 and sworn in on 31 May 2025. Plans for a 22 ministerial team, dubbed the "Government of Hope", were outlined by prime minister Kamil Idris on 19 June 2025.

Portfolio	Incumbent	Period
Prime Minister of Sudan	Kamil Idris	2025-
Minister of Agriculture and Irrigation	Ismat Qureshi Abdallah	2025-
Minister of Cabinet Affairs	Lemia Abdel Ghaffar Khalafallah	2025-
Minister of Defence	Hassan Daoud Kayan	2025-
Minister of Digital Transformation and Communications	Ahmed al-Dirdiri Ghandour	2025-
Minister of Education	Al-Tohami Al-Zain Hajar	2025-
Ministry of Energy and Petroleum	Al-Mutasim Ibrahim	2025-
Minister of Federal Governance and Rural Development	Mohamed Kortekila Saleh	2025-
Minister of Foreign Affairs	Mohieldin Salim Ahmed Ibrahim	2025-
Minister of Finance and Economic Planning	Gibril Ibrahim	2025-
Minister of Health	Haitham Ibrahim	2026-
Minister of Higher Education	Ahmed Madawi	2025-
Minister of Human Resources and Social Welfare	Sulaima Ishaq (minister of state)	2025-
Minister of Industry and Trade	Mahasen Ali Yaqoub	2025-
Ministry of Interior	Babiker Samra Mustafa	2025-
Minister of Information	TBA	2025-
Ministry of Justice	Abdullah Mohamed Derf	2025-
Minister of Labor and Administrative Reform	TBA	2025-
Minister of Religious Affairs	Bashir Haroun Abdel Karim Abdullah	2025-
Minister of Transport	TBA	2025-
Minister of Youth and Sports	Ahmed Adam Ahmed	2025-
Minister of Animal Resources and Fisheries	Ahmed Al-Tijani Al-Mansouri	2025-

== Previous cabinets ==
- National Revolutionary Command Council (Sudan)
- Transitional Military Council (1985)
- Revolutionary Command Council for National Salvation
- Transitional Military Council (2019)
- Abdalla Hamdok government (2019-2022)
- Osman Hussein government (2022-2025)
- Dafallah al-Haj Ali government (2025)

== See also ==
- Transitional Sovereignty Council
- Prime Minister of Sudan
- Government of Sudan
- Politics of Sudan
