= Faridun Muhiddinov =

Faridun Muhiddinov is a Tajikistani engineer and politician. He served as the Deputy Prime Minister of Construction. He additionally became Minister of Transport and Roads in 2000, a position from which he was fired by President Emomalii Rahmon in 2002 due to transportation chaos caused by that winter's severe weather. He left the position on December 17, being accused of poor management of energy and fuel issues.
