= List of permanent representatives of Sudan to the United Nations =

Wikimedian list

Permanent Representative of Sudan to the United Nations
- Emblem
- Incumbent; Al-Harith Idriss al-Harith Mohamed since 23 June 2023
- Style: Excellency
- Residence: 53 Avenue Blanc (3rd floor), 1202 Geneva
- Appointer: President of Sudan
- Term length: At the pleasure of the president
- Inaugural holder: Omar Abdel Hameed Adeel
- Formation: 30 July 1957; 69 years ago
- Website: sudanmission.ch

The permanent representative of Sudan to the United Nations is the Republic of Sudan's foremost diplomatic representative to the United Nations, and in charge of the Republic of Sudan Mission to the United Nations (SUD-MIS). Sudan permanent representatives to the UN hold the personal rank of ambassador. The full official title and style is His Excellency Permanent Representative from Sudan to the United Nations. The position was formed and filled on 30 July 1957 by Omar Abdel Hameed Adeel.

== Permanent representatives to the United Nations ==
#	Officeholder	Term start date	Time in office	Notes
1	Omar Abdel Hameed Adeel	30 July 1957	8 years	
2	Fakhreddine Mohamed	September 1965		
3	Mansour Khalid	c. 1970		
4	Awad El Karim Fadlalla	c. 1974		
5	A. Hassan	c. 1981		
6	Abdel-Rahman Abdalla	c. 1982		
7	Omer Alim	c. 1989		
8	Amin Magzoub Abdoun	c. 1990		
9	Elfatih Mohamed Ahmed Erwa	23 July 1996	10 years	
10	Abdalmahmood Abdalhaleem Mohamad	14 September 2006	3 years	
11	Daffa-Alla Elhag Ali Osman	13 August 2010	3 years	
12	Rahamtalla Mohamed Osman	16 April 2014	1 years	
13	Omer Dahab Fadl Mohamed	8 September 2015	3 years	
14	Omer Mohamed Ahmed Siddig	19 June 2019	2 years	
15	Al-Harith Idriss al-Harith Mohamed	23 May 2022	4 years	
