= Mohamed El-Amin Ahmed El-Tom =

Sudanese mathematician and minister of education (1941-)

Professor Mohamed El-Amin Ahmed El-Tom FAAS FIMA
- محمد الأمين أحمد التوم

Ministry of Education
- In office 5 September 2019 – 26 August 2022
- Prime Minister: Abdalla Hamdok
- Succeeded by: Mahmoud Sir Al-Khatam

Personal details
- Born: October 1941 (age 84)
- Scientific career
- Education: University of Leeds (BSc, 1965); University of Oxford (DPhil, 1969)
- Institutions: University of Khartoum (JRF); University of Louvain (Fellow); University of Ulster (Lecturer); Columbia University (Professor); University of Garden City (Dean)
- Thesis: Numerical Approximation of Functions of One or More Variables (1969)
- Doctoral advisor: David Christopher Handscomb

Mohamed El-Amin Ahmed El-Tom (Arabic: محمد الأمين أحمد التوم; born October 1941), also known as Muhammad Al-Amin Al-Tom, is a Sudanese mathematician and the first Minister of Education after the Sudanese Revolution, serving between 2019 and 2022. During his tenure, he worked on various initiatives to improve education in Sudan, including the development of a comprehensive plan for the sector. However, El-Tom and his assistant, Omer al-Qarray, faced controversy over the inclusion of Michelangelo's famous painting, The Creation of Adam, in Sudanese school textbooks. The decision was met with strong opposition from some conservative Muslim groups, who argued that the image of God reaching out to Adam in the painting was inconsistent with Islamic beliefs and should not be included in textbooks.

== Early life and education ==
Mohamed El-Amin Ahmed El-Tom was born in October 1941. He completed a Bachelor of Science degree in Mathematics from the University of Leeds with first class honours in 1965. This was followed by a Diploma in Advanced Mathematics from the University of Oxford in 1966 taking courses on Numerical Analysis, Functional Analysis, Group Theory, and Commutative Algebra. He then completed a Doctor of Philosophy (DPhil) in 1969, supervised by David Christopher Handscomb.

== Academic career ==
After his bachelor's, El-Tom became a junior scholar at the University of Khartoum (1962–65). Following his DPhil, he returned as a senior scholar between 1965 and 1968, where he helped establish the Mathematical Sciences School. Subsequently, he took on a position as a research fellow at the Center de Calcul, University of Louvain, Belgium (1968–69).

El-Tom advanced in his academic career, serving as a lecturer at the University of Ulster and later as a professor at Columbia University. His expertise also led him to roles at the European Center for Nuclear Research (CERN), Qatar University, and the Sudan Centre for Educational Research. Subsequently, he was appointed the dean of the University of Garden City.

=== Research ===
El-Tom has published over 50 papers on integration convergence, approximations, and interpolation. His work also focuses on the state and future of mathematics education and mathematical research in Sudan, Islamic countries, Africa, and North America.

In March 1978, El-Tom chaired and organised the International Conference on Developing Mathematics in Third World Countries, in Khartoum, and The Status and Future of Higher Education in Sudan, in Cairo, in 1998. Additionally, he co-founded the African Institute for Mathematical Sciences in Dar es Salaam in 2003.

== Minister of Education ==
After the Sudanese Revolution, the Sudanese Teachers Committee and the Northern Entity Alliance, one of the components of the Revolutionary Front, nominated El-Tom to be the minister of the Ministry of Education, due to his "deep patriotism, professionalism and high efficiency", and because "there is no person more qualified than him". On 5 September 2019, he was appointed Minister of Education.

=== Reforms ===
El-Tom, within the Council of Ministers, moved education from the ninth to second position in the government spending priorities, which were presented by the former Minister of Finance in charge of the Council. He championed implementing free education. Through donors, he provided $2 for each student per year. He also tried to secure school meals. El-Tom enacted new public and private education laws in 2020.

El-Tom introduced an e-learning management system, linking all schools throughout Sudan. He was also able to provide virtual training for hundreds of teachers by Sudanese companies, organisations and volunteers from abroad, who initially provided training in the English language. He developed a plan for training in mathematics. The Ministry of Education also authorised a regulation banning corporal punishment in educational institutions.

El-Tom proposed offering financial support to students pursuing education degrees as a means to boost the college's enrollment figures and guarantee the production of well-prepared teachers upon graduation. He is credited with improving the status of the teachers, by raising the salary of a new graduate from 3,000 SDG to more than 16,000 SDG per month. He planned for the construction Exemplary Schools, in terms of buildings and content, called the Twenty-First Century Skills Schools, which was funded by international donors.

In March 2020, following the declaration of the COVID-19 pandemic, the Sudanese Ministry of Education delayed the secondary school exams initially set for 12 April. The new date was to be announced later. At a press conference, El-Tom stated that the decision prioritised the well-being of students and their families. He acknowledged the sudden nature of the decision and its impact on the preparations for the exams, which involved approximately 500,000 students.

In August 2020, El-Tom argued against closing schools due to the pandemic, stating that many students would quit school and start working in markets, and a large part of the student body would forget previous lessons. However, he conceded to the Health Emergency Committee. In September 2020, the Ministry of Education declared a delay in the school opening date, initially set for the 27th of that month, to 22 November. This decision was made in response to the unpreparedness of many schools across different regions of Sudan, which were adversely affected by floods and heavy rainfall.

In November 2020, the World Bank Board of Directors approved an education project supported by a $61.5 million grant to support preparatory education in Sudan to maintain and improve basic education for children, with significant support for teachers, schools and communities. The project was planned to enhance the government's ability to formulate policies and monitor progress across the education system. This grant for education constituted the largest funding to support basic education in Sudan. The project covered all public schools, prioritising investment in disadvantaged and marginalised areas. In early 2020, the Global Partnership for Education provided an additional $11 million grant to support Sudan in strengthening programs to respond to the country's education needs in light of the COVID-19 pandemic.

In November 2020, as part of an initiative to give 50,000 out-of-school children access to high-quality formal and informal education, the Education Above All (EAA) Foundation and its partner UNICEF signed a Memorandum of Understanding (MoU) with the Federal Ministry of Education of Sudan. According to a statement from EAA, the project was planned to put a special emphasis on enhancing learning environments and building capacity to ensure that children who are deprived of education receive a quality education, as well as increasing community involvement and raising awareness of the value of access to and enrolment in primary education.

=== The new curriculum controversy ===
El-Tom's ministry had taken steps to reform the educational system in Sudan while advocating for "free education for all" by 2030. Regarding the curricula and their changes, El-Tom believed that the general trend, regardless of the subject, is to take into account the student's age and the readiness of their mind to absorb the material. El-Tom addressed the debate about adjusting the number of Qur’an surahs for a specific stage. He clarified that when choosing a surah for a six-year-old, it should align with specific objectives and the child's ability to memorise and understand it effortlessly. This task was carried out by the National Center for Educational Curricula, Training, Guidance and Research, led by Omer al-Qarray, which revised and developed elementary school curricula from grade one to grade six in 2020.

A public debate ensued involving politicians, clerics, and journalists over proposals to change the school curricula, led by the Director of Curricula at the Ministry of Education, Omar Al-Qarai. At the same time, education experts and activists opposed the change. The controversy began after a proposal for a new history book for the sixth grade was leaked. Specifically, the painting The Creation of Adam by Renaissance artist Michelangelo caused controversy due to claims of it being heretical. In January 2021, discussions about the curricula emerged on social media among Sudanese individuals. Additionally, accounts and pages were created that either criticized or supported Omar Al-Qarai. The situation worsened as a video emerged featuring imam Muhammad Al-Amin Ismail, shedding tears during the Friday Khutbah. In the video, he expressed his disappointment regarding the content in the new curricula before launching a criticism against Al-Qarai.

The head of the Sudan Liberation Movement/Army, Minni Minnawi, tweeted that the campaign led by some imams do not stem from motives to preserve religion, but rather was a political campaign aimed at obstructing change that begins with the educational curricula. The political secretary of the Justice and Equality Movement, Suleiman Sandal, stated in press statements that "a school curriculum will not be taught to our children that contains images that embody God while we are in the government". The leader of the National Umma Party, Abd al-Rahman al-Ghali, incited the government to dismiss al-Qarai pointing to Al-Qari's intellectual and political background as a member of the Republican Brotherhood, whose founder, Mahmoud Mohammed Taha, was executed in 1985 on charges of apostasy.

The educational expert, Mubarak Yahya, head of the Sudanese Coalition for Education for All, criticised the regression of the curricula issue to the political arena and the quarrels that it entailed. He said that the curricula required a national conference to ensure proper construction of them at a high professional level and societal values and advice, far from politics. However a member of the Central Council of the Sudanese Gathering of the Teachers Committee, Ammar Yusef, believed that there is a campaign against Al-Qari behind which supporters of the former regime stand. But he pointed out that the Teachers' Committee did not participate in developing the new curricula.

Omer al-Qarray blamed the Minister of Religious Affairs and Endowments, Nasr al-Din Mufreh, for his silence even when some clerics called for his death. Al-Qari had insisted that he would not step down unless a decision was taken to cancel the curricula in response to pressure. However, Al-Qarai resigned soon afterwards on 7 January 2021.

The Sudanese Teachers Committee affirmed that there would be no turning back from the project of radical change in the education system that was initiated by the Ministry of Education, and great strides were made in it.

Prime Minister Abdallah Hamdok formed a national committee to review the curricula, and to submit its report after two weeks. The committee ensured that specialists prepared each subject and that the curriculum met high-quality educational goals, professional and national standards, and was teachable.

=== Formation of a new government ===
On 8 February 2021, Sudanese Prime Minister Abdallah Hamdok issued a decision to relieve the ministers of the transitional government from their positions in preparation of a new government formation. The statement added that the ministers would continue in their positions as caretakers until the formation of the new government and the completion of handover procedures once the Transitional Sovereignty Council had announced the formation of the new government. The statement indicated that the new formation would not include the name of a Minister of Education, as consultations were still taking place regarding this ministry.

El-Tom was excluded from the new cabinet's nomination list by the Prime Minister Abdalla Hamdok, who submitted the list to the Transitional Sovereignty Council under the pretext that El-Tom had failed a "security check". The Sudanese Teachers Committee protested the exclusion. El-Tom considered his exclusion from the ministry due to a failed security check a “disgrace to his reputation”, which caused him "psychological harm". He told Al-Ekhbari: "I am now an accused citizen, and those accusing me must prove whether I am an agent, or have I committed a crime, or been involved in corruption, or what?". He mentioned that he received calls questioning if he had committed any wrongdoing that might have led to his exclusion from the ministry.

The Teachers Committee - the leading component of the Sudanese Professionals Association - announced its rejection of the partisan quota of the ministry, and supported El-Tom. In May 2021 and after two months of the post being vacant, a memorandum calling on the Prime Minister to name El-Tom as Minister of Education was signed by a group of civil society organisations, university professors and intellectuals. The memorandum also demanded the approval of the laws drawn up by the competent committees to reform education including the Public Education Law of 2020, the Private Education Law of 2020, and the Law of the National Center for Educational Curricula, Training, Guidance and Research 2020.

In April 2021, the Ministry of Education denied that El-Tom has resigned, contrary to what was being circulated on social media. However, on 26 August 2021, El-Tom announced that he had submitted his resignation letter to Hamdok because Hamdok sanctioned the new curriculum, after it had been approved by the Minister of Education.

Afterwards, Hamdok demanded that each book of the textbooks be carefully reviewed by authors, language specialists and designers, including illustrators and makers of pictures. Hamdok also requested that the draft of the book be sent to reviewers specialised in the subject of each book. Hamdok called for the rewriting of the history book for the sixth grade and the preservation of the contested surahs without removing any of the verses, and keeping all the units and lessons that were removed from the mathematics textbooks. Hamdok met with delegations of Islamic and Christian clerics, alongside the Minister of Religious Affairs, Nasr al-Din Mufreh, to discuss reviewing the curriculum developed under Omer al-Qarray's leadership at the National Curriculum Center.

== Personal life ==
El-Tom is married with three children.

== Awards and honours ==
El-Tom was elected a Fellow of the Institute of Mathematics and its Applications (FIMA) in 1978, and a Fellow of the African Academy of Sciences (FAAS) in 1986. He was a member of the International Centre for Theoretical Physics, Trieste, Italy, between 1984 and 1989. He is also a member of the Arab Thought Forum, Jordan since 1985, the Mathematical Association of America, USA since 1992, the American Mathematical Society, USA since 1995, and the Sudanese National Academy of Sciences since 2007.

In response to an invitation from the Global Science Program at Uppsala University, El-Tom participated in attending the 2013 Nobel Prize event in Stockholm. In 2021, he was elected Sudan’s personality of the year by Al Khatim Adlan Center for Enlightenment and Human Development (KACE).
