= Omar Adeel =

Sudanese civil servant (1923–1976)

- عمر عديل

Permanent Representatives of Sudan to the United Nations
- In office 30 July 1957 – September 1965
- President: Sovereignty Council; Ibrahim Abboud; Sovereignty Council
- Prime Minister: Ismail al-Azhari; Abdallah Khalil; Sirr Al-Khatim Al-Khalifa (acting); Muhammad Ahmad Mahgoub
- Preceded by: Office established
- Succeeded by: Fakhreddine Mohamed

Personal details
- Born: 21 July 1923 Dongola, Northern State, Anglo-Egyptian Sudan
- Died: 1976 (aged 52–53)
- Education: Gordon Memorial College; University of Exeter; University of London

Omar Abdel Hameed Adeel (Arabic: عمر عبد الحميد عديل, 21 July 1923 – 1976) was a Sudanese civil servant and diplomat. He is the inaugural Permanent Representatives of Sudan to the United Nations.

== Biography ==
=== Early life ===
Adeel was born on 21 July 1923, in Baja village near Dongola, Northern State during the Anglo-Egyptian occupation of Sudan. He completed high school in Atbara, then moved to Khartoum to attend Gordon Memorial College but left after completing his second year.

=== Career ===
Adeel sat for the civil service exam. He worked as a writer in the Sudanese Railways Department (1942 – 1943), the Sudan Defence Force (1943 – 1945), the Customs Department (1945 – 1947), then the Police Department (1948 – 1956).

While working with the Police Department, Adeel completed a diploma in Law at the University of Exeter, followed by a bachelor degree in Law at the University of London. Between 1954 and 1956, he was part of the transitional team working between the Governor-General of the Sudan government and the Sudanese interim-government.

Adeel became the Sudanese ambassador to Italy after Sudan independence in 1956. On 30 July 1957, Adeel became the inaugural Permanent Representatives of Sudan to the United Nations, where he became a member of the Asian-African block in the UN. In 1962, he was elected unanimously as the chairman of the UN General Assembly's political committee.

In 1964, Adeel was one of three candidates for the 19th president of the United Nations General Assembly. Alex Quaison-Sackey was elected, earning 18 out of 33 votes, to become the first black African to occupy that position. In December 1964 and following the October 1964 Revolution in Sudan, he was replaced by Fakhreddine Mohamed as the Permanent Representatives of Sudan to the United Nations.

In 1965, Adeel served as one of the UN observers for the 1965 Cook Islands general election. In 1966, he was appointed the UN representative on the "Aden question", which referred to the issue of the decolonisation of the British colony of Aden, including the Eastern and Western Aden Protectorates, and surrounding islands, and its future status.

In 1974, he became the Resident Representative of the UN Development Programme in Iraq. There, he became a close friend to Ahmed Hassan al-Bakr, President of Iraq from 1968 to 1979.

=== Personal life and death ===
In 1972, Adeel was accused by a New York woman of fathering her child and demanded financial support. Adeel invoked diplomatic immunity, leading to the case's dismissal.

He died in 1976.

== Awards and honours ==
Adeel received the Grand Cross of Order of St. Sylvester, the Order of Merit of the Italian Republic, and the grand officer of the Order of Menelik II.
