= Nasredeen Abdulbari =

Sudanese-American human rights activist

- نصرالدين عبدالباري
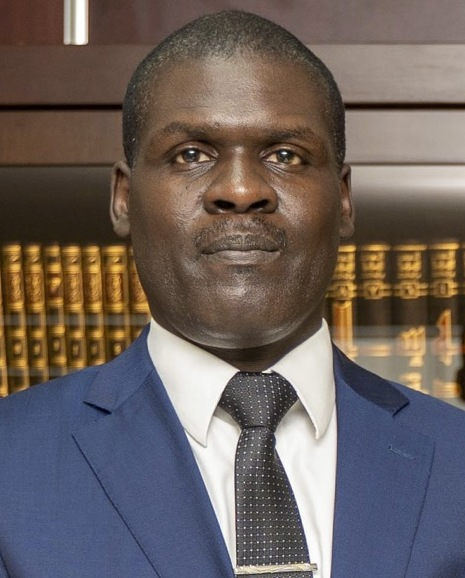
- Nasredeen Abdulbari in 2021

Minister of Justice of Sudan
- In office 9 September 2019 – 02 January 2022
- Prime Minister: Abdalla Hamdok
- Preceded by: Idris Ibrahim Jameel
- Succeeded by: Mohamed Saeed Al-Hilu

Personal details
- Born: 1986 (age 39–40) Khartoum, Sudan
- Party: Forces of Freedom and Change
- Education: University of Khartoum, Harvard University, Georgetown University
- Occupation: Lawyer, academic, and author

Nasredeen Abdulbari (Arabic: نصر الدين عبد الباري) is a Sudanese-American author, lawyer, and human rights advocate who became the Minister of Justice on 9 September 2019 in the transitional cabinet of Abdalla Hamdok, during the 2019 Sudanese transition to democracy.

== Early life and education ==
Abdulbari was born to a Fur family in Khartoum, Sudan in 1986. Kalthoum Ismail was his mother. When his older siblings were young, Abdulbari's family moved to Khartoum for better educational opportunities. However, shortly afterwards, his father returned to Darfur, leaving Ismail to raise Abdulbari and his 6 siblings. As a child, Abdulbari studied English.

After completing primary schooling, Abdulbari studied at the University of Khartoum, where he also served as a teaching assistant and later a lecturer in the department of international comparative law. He taught public international law, conflict of laws, and introduction to the English Legal courses. At the University of Khartoum, Abdulbari also met Mohammed Hassan Eltaishi, who would later represent the Sudanese government in peace talks with rebel groups.

== Life abroad ==
After teaching abroad, Abdulbari received a scholarship from Harvard University to continue studying law, where he would receive a Master of Laws in 2008. In 2018, Abdulbari married his wife, a Sudanese doctor in Britain. Abdulbari would move to London and later Washington, D.C., where he would study at Georgetown University until he was appointed Minister of Justice on 9 September 2019, as he was putting the final touches on his doctoral dissertation. While serving as Minister of Justice, he was able to successfully defend his doctoral dissertation and earn a Doctor of Juridical Science (SJD) degree from Georgetown University Law Center.

== Minister of Justice ==
Abdulbari was appointed Minister of Justice on 9 September 2019, while he was still living in the United States. As Minister of Justice, Abdulbari has worked to increase the rights of Sudanese citizens and especially women, including the repeal of the Public Order Laws that restricted women's rights in December 2019. Abdulbari has also advocated for Sudan to sign the Convention on the Elimination of All Forms of Discrimination Against Women.
