= Dafallah al-Haj Ali =

Acting Prime Minister of Sudan in 2025

- دفع الله الحاج علي

Prime Minister of Sudan
- Acting
- In office 30 April 2025 – 31 May 2025
- President: Abdel Fattah al-Burhan
- Preceded by: Osman Hussein (acting)
- Succeeded by: Kamil Idris

Permanent Representatives of Sudan to the United Nations
- In office 13 August 2010 – 16 April 2014
- President: Omar al-Bashir
- Preceded by: Abdelmahmood Abdelhaleem
- Succeeded by: Rahamtalla Mohamed Osman

Dafallah al-Haj Ali Osman (Arabic: دفع الله الحاج علي عثمان, romanized: Dafʻ Allāh al-Ḥājj ʻAlī ʻUthmān) is a Sudanese diplomat and politician who was the acting prime minister of Sudan from 30 April to 31 May 2025.

== Biography ==
Osman earned a bachelor's degree from the University of Khartoum in 1978. He became a diplomat in 1980s and served as Sudan ambassador to France (2016–2020), Pakistan, and Vatican.

Osman was the Permanent Representatives of Sudan to the United Nations between 13 August 2010 to 16 April 2014. After the Israeli airstrike of the Yarmouk ammunition factory in 2012, Osman brought the case to the UN Security Council. He also claimed that Israel had violated Sudanese air space three times in recent years. Osman further said that Sudan has a "right to react" and to strike Israel.

In 2019, Osman applied for early retirement but returned after the 2021 coup d'état, becoming the undersecretary of the Ministry of Foreign Affairs until 8 December 2023. In 2024, he was appointed the Sudanese ambassador to Saudi Arabia.

On 30 April 2025, Osman was appointed acting prime minister by president of the Transitional Sovereignty Council Abdel Fattah al-Burhan.

== See also ==
- Dafallah al-Haj Ali government
