= Fishing industry in Sudan =

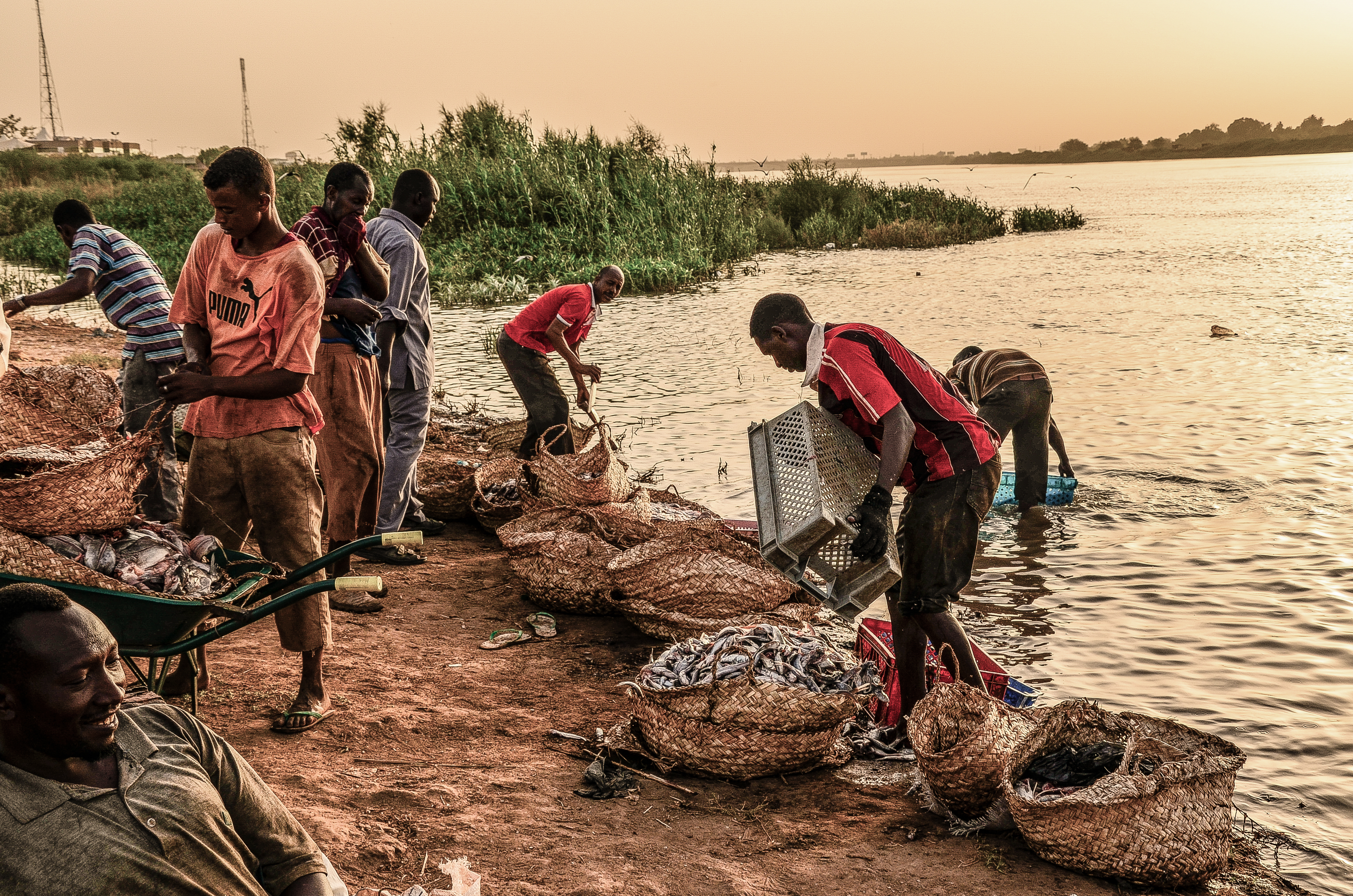
Fishing on the river Nile, by Eythar Gubara, 2014

Fishing in Sudan is largely carried out by the traditional sector for subsistence, although a number of small operators also use the country's major reservoirs and the rivers to catch fish for sale locally and in nearby urban centers. There are also some modern fishing ventures, mainly on Lake Nubia and in the Red Sea.

Sudan’s total production of fish, shellfish, and other fishing products had significant growth in recent years. Production averaged 58,000 tonnes by 2001, with estimates by the then-Ministry of Livestock Services of a potential yearly catch of 150,000 tonnes per annum from freshwater sources and 10,000 tonnes from the Red Sea. The principal source of fish is the Nile River system. Further, several lakes and reservoirs were formed by the damming of the river and its branches: the 180-kilometer section of Lake Nubia in Sudan and the reservoirs behind the Roseires and Sinnar dams on the Blue Nile, the Jabal al-Awliya Dam on the White Nile, and the Khashm al Qirbah Dam on the Atbarah.

Production from Lake Nubia was initially far below its potential. Inhabitants around the lake, which had formed gradually in the 1960s, had no previous experience in fishing, and the first significant commercial exploitation of the lake’s resources was undertaken by the government’s Fisheries Administration. In 1973 a private company also started operations. Somewhat later, an ice plant and a cold-storage facility were built at Wadi Halfa with assistance from China. China also furnished fishing vessels and other fishing equipment. New cooling plants at Khartoum and Atbarah held fish transported from Wadi Halfa by railroad. Fish production from the lake reached 2,000 tonnes by 1997-99, but declined to 1,000 tonnes by 2000-2001.

The Red Sea coastal area was relatively unexploited until the late 1970s. In 1978 the British Ministry of Overseas Development began a joint project with Sudan’s Fisheries Administration to raise output by making boats, motors, and equipment available to fishermen. A new ice plant at Sawakin provided local fishermen with ice for their catch. By 2000-2001, about 5,000 tonnes of fish, shellfish (including pearl oysters), and other marine life were taken annually.

The quantity of fish, crustaceans, and mollusks caught in Sudan in recent years amounted to between 57,000 tonnes in 2002 and 2006 and 72,000 tonnes in 2010. Aquaculture production reached a high of 1,950 tonnes in 2007.
