= Peter Nyot Kok =

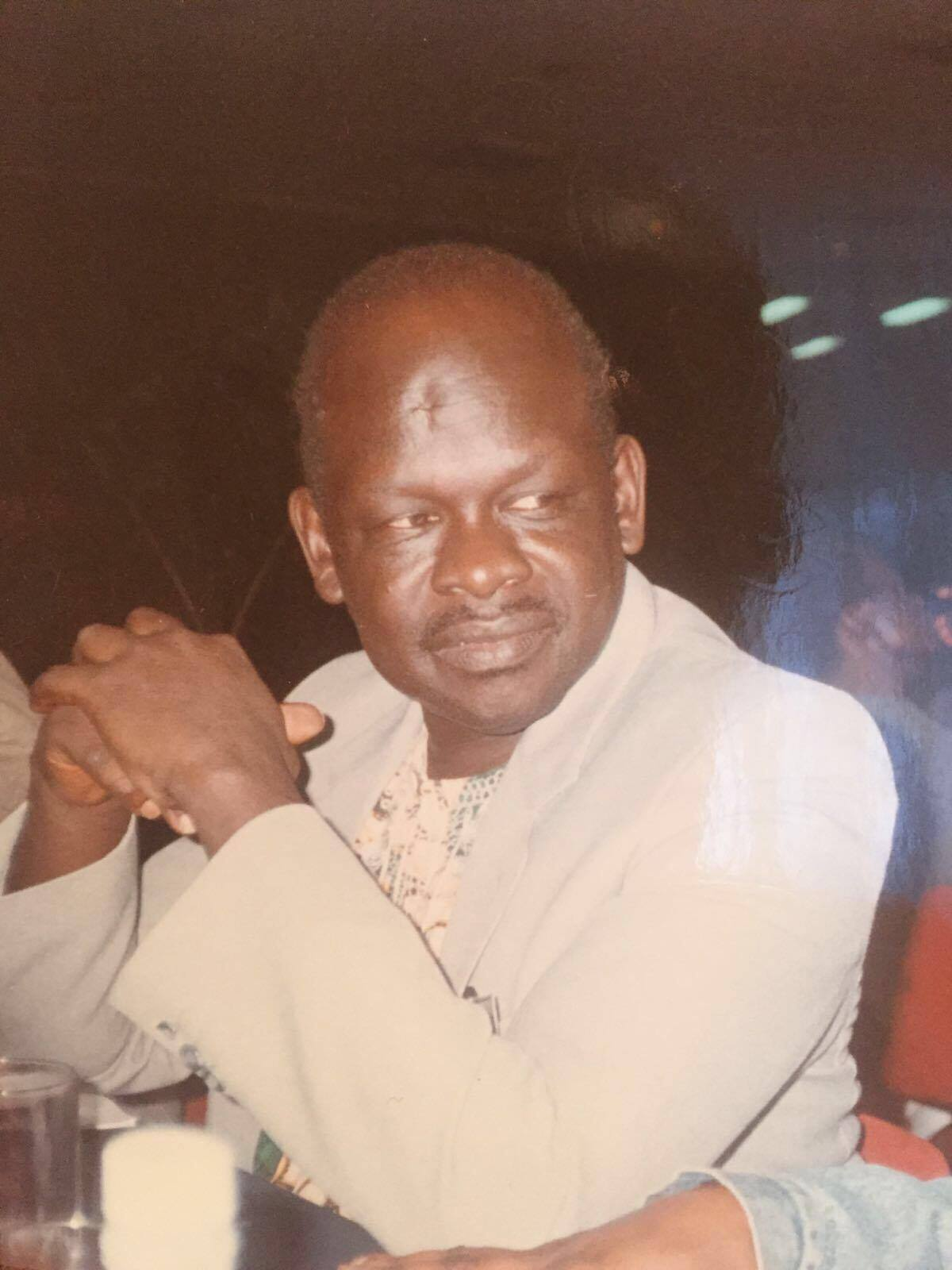
Portrait of Peter Nyot Kok

Peter Nyot Kok (died June 28, 2015) was a South Sudanese politician. He hailed from Rumbek. Kok was a professor of law, specializing in constitutional law and Islamic law.

As of the mid-1980s he worked at the Max Planck Institute whilst serving as the Sudan People's Liberation Army (SPLM) Secretary for Legal Affairs at the same time. At the time he lived in Hamburg.

He was named Minister of Higher Education in the Sudanese government after the 2005 Comprehensive Peace Accord. He was a member of the Political Bureau of the SPLM.

Kok died on June 28, 2015, in Hamburg.
