= Muawiya Osman Muhammad Khair =

Sudan Minister of Justice

- معاوية عثمان محمد خير

Minister of Justice
- In office 1 December 2023 – 10 July 2025
- Appointed by: Transitional Sovereignty Council
- Preceded by: Mohamed Saeed al-Hilu

Personal details
- Education: Cairo University; Al Neelain University; University of Juba
- Profession: Attorney

Maulana Muawiya Osman Muhammad Khair is a Sudanese lawyer and former Minister of Justice of Sudan.

== Education ==
Muawiya obtained his first degree in law at Cairo University in 1985. In 1987, he obtained certificate of Organization of the Legal Profession the University of Juba and 1995 he bagged a diploma in Public Law from the University of Nilein. In 2006, he received his master's degree in private law and in 2012 he bagged his PhD in private law with a thesis titled Regulating Legal Rules To Attract Foreign Investments.

== Career ==
Muawiya started his career as a lawyer between 1987 and 1989. He then moved to the Ministry of Justice in the latter date where he served as the Legal Advisor to the Ministry of Commerce between 1989 and 1992, legal Advisor to the General Company for Spinning and Weaving between 1992 and 1993, public prosecutor of El Fasher between 1993 and 1994. In 1994, he was appointed as the legal advisor to the Humanitarian Aid Commission up till 1998 when he became Legal Advisor to the Land Transport Unit. In 1999, he became legal advisor to the Ministers of International Cooperation and Investment for a year before he was assigned to the ministry of industry for two years, 2000 to 2002. In 2023, he became the Minister of Justice of the Federal Republic of Sudan. In 2025, he appeared before the International Court of Justice (ICJ) on behalf of Sudan in a case brought against the United Arab Emirates (UAE), after Sudan's military government accused the UAE of backing the RSF and its allied militias, contributing to the country's civil war.
