= Ahmed al-Dirdiri Ghandour =

Sudanese politician

- أحمد الدرديري غندور

Minister of Communications and Digital Transformation
- Incumbent
- Assumed office 28 July 2025
- Prime Minister: Kamil Idris

Personal details
- Education: University of Khartoum

Ahmed al-Dirdiri Ghandour (Arabic: أحمد الدرديري غندور) is a Sudanese telecommunications executive and politician serving as the Minister of Communications and Digital Transformation since 28 July 2025. Before entering government, he held senior leadership positions at MTN Sudan , which included the Managing Director of the MTN Business Sector.

== Early life and education ==
Ghandour earned his Bachelor of Science in Computer Science from the University of Khartoum in 2004. He later obtained a Master of Business Administration (MBA) with a focus on finance from the same institution in 2018.

Ahmed Dirdiri handour began his career at MTN Sudan, where he held several technical and managerial roles, including Director of Intelligent Services (VAS), Director of Core Networks, and General Manager of the Enterprise Business Unit (MTN Business) for over eight years. He later served as General Manager of Transformation (PMO) at MTN Group.

He holds a BSc in Computer Science and an MBA in Finance from the University of Khartoum. Ghandour is certified as a CCIE Service Provider, PMP, PRINCE2 Practitioner, and Certified Ethical Hacker (CEH). He also co-owns a copyright for a cloud-native open-source 5G IP solution .

=== Minister of Digital Transformation and Communication ===
On 28 July 2025, Prime Minister Kamil Idris appointed Ghandour as Minister of Communications and Digital Transformation in a cabinet reshuffle aimed at advancing Sudan’s digital agenda. He chaired the inaugural Ministry Council meeting on 8 August 2025 in Port Sudan, focusing on post-war reconstruction through technology, including infrastructure, government networks, artificial intelligence, and cybersecurity.

Digital Transformation Initiatives Under his leadership, the ministry launched the 3×3 Digital Transformation Plan, a 100-day program uniting government, private sector, and citizens around a roadmap to improve service delivery, rebuild trust in government, and enhance institutional efficiency established the single window platform (baldna) . Initiatives include the rollout of the unified government platform baldna , designed to integrate multiple services electronically.

In November 2025, the Sudanese government established three new national authorities under the ministry: the Digital Transformation Authority (DTA), the Sudanese Data and Artificial Intelligence Authority (SDA), and the Sudanese Cybersecurity Authority (SCA), as part of institutional reform to modernize state structures and strengthen digital governance.

The Digital Transformation Authority oversees national digital strategies, unifying technical infrastructure, and developing government services efficiently. The Sudanese Data and Artificial Intelligence Authority is responsible for national data governance, promoting AI integration in decision-making and public service development. The Sudanese Cybersecurity Authority builds national cybersecurity capacity, secures state and citizen digital assets, and incorporates existing electronic certification functions.

Ghandour has also promoted national cybersecurity initiatives, including workshops for cybercrime prosecutors and collaboration with Sudan’s Computer Emergency Response Team (Sudan-CERT) to enhance legal and technical capacities.

He has championed the SudaPass national digital identity system, providing citizens with a secure access point for government and private services, a cornerstone of Sudan’s digital transformation strategy.
