= Ministry of Transport (Tajikistan) =

Government ministry of Tajikistan

Ministry of Transport of Tajikistan
Agency overview
- Formed: 28 February 2011; 15 years ago
- Jurisdiction: Government of Tajikistan
- Headquarters: 14 Aini Street, Dushanbe, Tajikistan
- Minister responsible: Azim Ibrohim
- Website: www.mintrans.tj/tg

The Ministry of Transport of the Republic of Tajikistan (Tajik: Вазорати нақлиёти Ҷумҳурии Тоҷикистон) is the central executive body of the Government of Tajikistan, responsible for the development and implementation of state policy and regulation of legal norms in the field of transport.

== History ==
From 1994 to 2000, the Ministry of Transport and Road Economy of the Republic of Tajikistan existed, and from 2000 to 2006, the Ministry of Transport of the Republic of Tajikistan. By order of President Emomali Rahmon on November 30, 2006, the Ministry of Transport of Tajikistan was renamed the Ministry of Transport and Communications, as a result of the merger of the former Ministry of Transport, the Ministry of Communications, and the Department of Civil Aviation under the Government. On February 28, 2011, the Ministry of Transport and Communications was renamed the Ministry of Transport, and the communications sector was separated from the transport and road economy sector.

== Structure ==
- Leadership
- Department of Surface Transportation
- Department of Construction and Road Management
- Civil Aviation Administration
- Department of Economic Analysis and Forecasting
- International Relations Department
- Finance and Accounting Department
- Department of Works
- Personnel and Special Affairs Department
- Internal Audit Department
- Law Department

=== Management ===
- Central Station
- State Service for Supervision and Regulation in the Field of Transport

=== List of enterprises and institutions ===
- Hissor Region Road Management Department
- Rasht Region Road Management Department
- Sughd Regional Road Administration
- Department of Automobile Roads of the Khatlon Region
- Kulyab Region Road Management Department
- Roads Department of Gorno-Badakhshan
- Administration of Enterprises Under Construction
- Tojiktransstroy
- Transport Newspaper
- Automobile Transport and Logistics Services
- Tajikistan Railway
- Scientific Research, Design and Exploration Institute
- Tajikaeronavigatsiya
- Tajik Air
- Dushanbe International Airport
- Khujand International Airport
- Bokhtar International Airport
- Kulob International Airport
- Transport Sector Digitization Center

== List of ministers ==
- Faridun Muhiddinov (2000 - December 17, 2002)
- Khudoyar Khudoyarzoda (January 23, 2017 — August 31, 2020)
- Azim Ibrohim (since August 31, 2020)

== See also ==
- Transport in Tajikistan

== Links ==
- www.mintrans.tj/tg — Official Website of the Ministry of Transport
