= Ministry of Livestock and Fisheries =

Ministry of Livestock and Fisheries may refer to:

- Ministry of Livestock and Fisheries (Tanzania)
- Ministry of Livestock, Fisheries and Rural Development, in Myanmar
- Ministry of Livestock, Agriculture, and Fisheries, in Uruguay
- Ministry of Livestock and Fisheries (Sudan)

== See also ==
- Ministry of Livestock
- Ministry of Animal Resources and Fisheries
