= Dushanbe Railway Station =

Railway station in Tajikistan

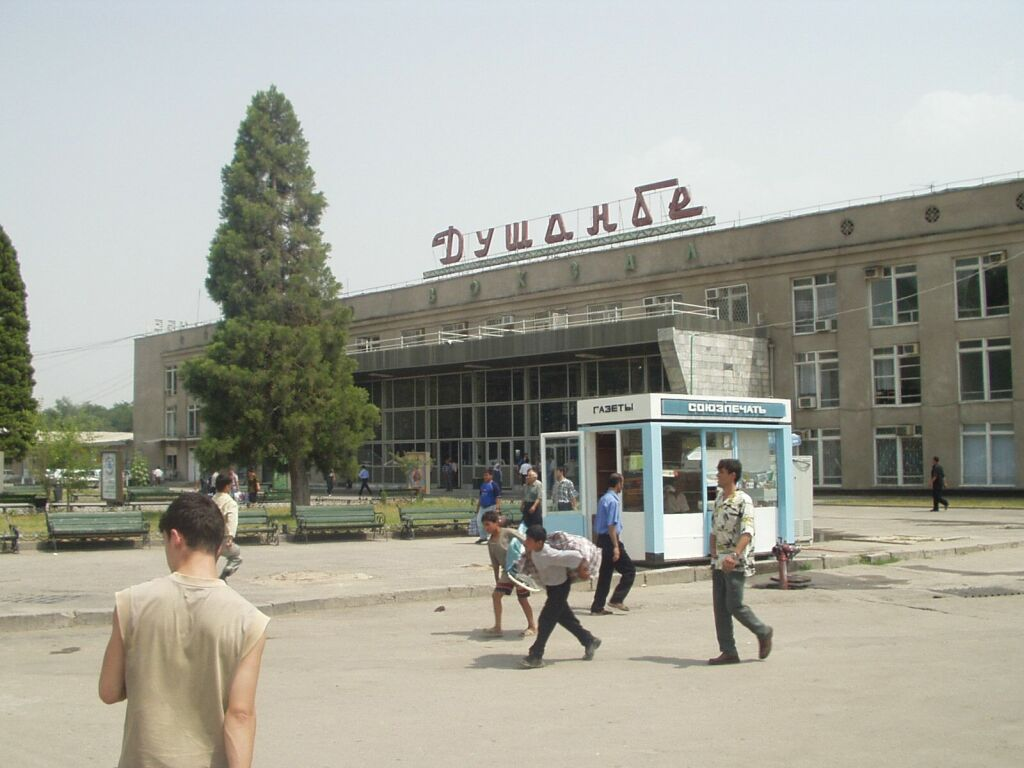

General information
- Location: Dushanbe; Tajikistan
- Coordinates: 38°36′N 68°49′E
- System: Tajikistan Railways
- Owner: Tajikistan Railways

Construction
- Parking: Yes

History
- Opened: 1929
Location

Dushanbe Railway Station (Tajik: Душанбе) is a train station located in Dushanbe, Tajikistan.

== History ==
The history of the Dushanbe railway station begins in 1936, although the first train to Dushanbe arrived on September 10, 1929. The first train from Moscow arrived in Stalinabad on December 29, 1950. The new station was built in 1963 and is still operating. In 1962, the first diesel locomotive TE2 (diesel locomotive with electric transmission), which was produced in Kharkov from 1948 to 1955, arrived from Tashkent to Dushanbe. Today, the station receives hundreds of thousands of passengers a year, and in general, Tajik Railways serve about half a million passengers.

== Trains ==
Three pairs of trains run from the station:

- Dushanbe - Pakhtaabad (daily)
- Dushanbe - Shaartuz / Kulob (on Tuesdays and Saturdays)
- Dushanbe - Tashkent (weekly)

== See also ==
- Rail transport in Tajikistan
