= Ministry of Education (Sudan) =

Government ministry of Sudan

- Arabic: وزارة التربية والتعليم

Agency overview
- Jurisdiction: Government of Sudan
- Headquarters: Alneel Avenue, Khartoum, Khartoum State; 15°36′51″N 32°33′07″E
- Minister responsible: Al-Tohami Al-Zain Hajar
- Website: www.moe.gov.sd
- no

The Ministry of Education (Arabic: وزارة التربية والتعليم) in Sudan is responsible for overseeing the education system in the country. Their strategy involves providing education in the context of an economic crisis, inflation, and limited availability of commodities, wheat, fuel, and medicine. During the transitional period, the Government of Sudan have identified 10 strategic priorities, including sustainable peace, stabilizing the economy, fighting corruption, law and justice, women representation, reform institutions, foreign policy, social development, youth employment, and constitution and elections.

The Ministry of Education and the Ministry of Higher Education and Scientific Research in Sudan have different areas of focus within the education sector. The Ministry of Education is responsible for overseeing the general education system in the country. This includes primary, secondary, and vocational education. Their responsibilities typically involve setting educational policies, developing curriculum, and implementing systemic improvements. On the other hand, the Ministry of Higher Education and Scientific Research is responsible for supervising and controlling public and private higher education institutions. This includes universities and other institutions offering education at the post-secondary level. They also work on promoting the level of higher education to align with global developments.

== Impact of the 2023 civil war ==
The war that began on 15 April 2023 disrupted education across Sudan. In October 2023, UNICEF and Save the Children estimated that about 19 million children were out of school and that at least 10,400 schools had closed in conflict-affected areas. By September 2025, around 45% of schools had reopened, while an estimated 13 million children remained out of school.

== Ministers ==
- 1973 – 1975: Sirr Al-Khatim Al-Khalifa
- 1975 – 1976: Mansour Khalid
- 1980s: Nazir Dafallah
- 1989: Abdullahi Mohammad Ahmad Hassan
- 21 September 26 – December 2007: 2005 Paul Mithanq
- 26 December 2007 – 16 June 2010: Hamid Muhammad Ibrahim
- 16 June 2010 – 27 December 2011: Farah Mustafa Abdallah
- 27 December 2011 – 12 May 2017: Suaad Abdul Razig
- 12 May 2017 – 9 September 2018: Asia Mohamed Abdalla
- 9 September 2018 – 13 March 2019: Mashair Ahmed al-Amin al-Dawalab
- 13 March 2019 – 11 April 2019: Al-Khair al-Nour al-Mubrak
- 5 September 2019 – 26 August 2022: Mohamed El-Amin Ahmed El-Tom
- January 2022 – 16 August 2024: Mahmoud Sir Al-Khatam
- 30 April 2025 – present: Al-Tohami Al-Zain Hajar

== See also ==
- Cabinet of Sudan
