= Ministry of Public Works (The Bahamas) =

Government ministry of the Bahamas

The Ministry of Public Works, formerly Ministry of Works & Urban Development and Ministry of Public Works and Transport, is a government agency of the Commonwealth of the Bahamas. Its head office is in Nassau.

As of May 2017 Desmond Bannister was the minister, Iram Lewis, was Parliamentary Secretary, and Antonette Thompson was the Permanent Secretary.
