= Mahmoud Sir Al-Khatam =

Sudanese politician (1965/1966–2024)

- محمود سر الختم

Minister of Education
- In office January 2022 – 16 August 2024
- Preceded by: Mohamed El-Amin Ahmed El-Tom
- Succeeded by: Al-Tohami Al-Zain Hajar

Personal details
- Born: 1965 or 1966
- Died: 16 August 2024 (aged 58) Cairo, Egypt

Mahmoud Sir Al-Khatam (Arabic: محمود سر الختم; 1965 or 1966 – 16 August 2024) was a Sudanese politician. He served as Minister of Education from 2022 to 2024.

Al-Khatam died of a heart attack in Cairo on 16 August 2024.
