= Ministry of Justice (Sudan) =

Government ministry of Sudan

Coordinates: 15°36′34″N 32°31′56″E

Republic of the Sudan Ministry of Justice

Agency overview
- Jurisdiction: Government of Sudan
- Headquarters: Khartoum
- Agency executive: Abdullah Mohamed Derf, Minister of Justice

The Ministry of Justice of Sudan (Arabic: وزارة العدل السودانية, romanized: Wizārat al-ʻAdl) was created in 1956 by Mohammed Ahmed Abu Ranat and Ahmed Metwally al-Atabani (who became a judiciary head and deputy general respectively after the country's independence from Anglo-Egyptian rule). In 1983, the ministry's responsibilities were clearly defined to include representing the state in legal affairs, reviewing and reforming laws that promote justice, and other functions.

Before 2019 and signing of the Draft Constitutional Declaration, the Minister of Justice also served as the Attorney General, combining executive oversight of the justice system with prosecutorial authority. On 10 October 2019, Tag el-Sir el-Hibir was appointed as the Attorney General but the office was abolished following the 2021 coup d'état.

== List of ministers ==
- 'Ali 'Abd al-Rahman (1954–1955)
- Ziada Osman Arbab (1956–1964)
- Rashid al-Tahir (1964–1965)
- Mamoun Sinada (1966–1968)
- Rashid al-Tahir (1968–1969)
- Amin al-Tahir al-Shibli (1969–1971)
- Ahmad Sulayman (1971–1973)
- Hasan al-Turabi (1988–1989)
- Hasan Ishma'il al-Bili (1989–1990)
- Ahmad Mahmud Hassan (1991–1992)
- Abdallah Idris (1992–1993)
- Abd El-Aziz Shiddo (1993–1996)
- Abdel Basit Sabdarat (1996–1997)
- 'Ali Muhammed 'Uthman Yasin (1998–2005)
- Mohamed Ali Al-Mardi (2006–2007)
- 'Abd Al-Basit Sabdarat (2007–2010)
- Mohammed Bushara Dousa (2010–2017)
- Idris Ibrahim Jamil (2017–2019)
- Nasredeen Abdulbari (also: Nasr-Eddin Abdul-Bari, Nasr al-Din Abdel Bari) (2019–2022)
- Mohamed Saeed Al-Hilu (2022-2023)
- Muawiya Osman Muhammad Khair (2023-2025)
- Abdullah Mohamed Darf (2025–present)

== See also ==
- Justice ministry
- Cabinet of Sudan
- Politics of Sudan
