= Ministry of Animal Resources and Fisheries (Sudan) =

Ministry in Sudan

- Arabic: وزارة الثروة الحيوانية والسمكية

Agency overview
- Jurisdiction: Government of Sudan
- Headquarters: Al-Harya Street, Khartoum, Khartoum State
- Minister responsible: Ahmed Al-Tijani Al-Mansouri

The Ministry of Animal Resources and Fisheries (Arabic: وزارة الثروة الحيوانية والسمكية), also known as the Ministry of Livestock and Fisheries, is a federal government ministry in Sudan responsible for livestock production, animal health, veterinary services and fisheries. Its functions include formulating national policy, supervising veterinary quarantine, issuing import and export certification, monitoring animal diseases, and coordinating federal programmes with Sudan’s state-level veterinary authorities. As of June 2026, the minister is Ahmed Al-Tijani Al-Mansouri and the undersecretary is Ammar Al-Sheikh Idris.

== History and organisation ==
Sudan’s central veterinary administration traces its institutional origins to a veterinary service established in 1898, with the Ministry of Livestock being founded in 1902 by Reginald Wingate,Governor-General of Anglo-Egyptian Sudan. By 2009, the Ministry of Animal Resources and Fisheries supervised veterinary activities at the national level, while state ministries administered local veterinary services.

The ministry has also overseen specialised institutions. Sudan’s Wildlife Research Center, for example, was transferred to the ministry in 1995, moved to the Ministry of Science and Technology in 2002 and returned to the animal-resources ministry in 2010.

== Responsibilities ==
The ministry oversees national surveillance and control programmes for epidemic, transboundary and zoonotic animal diseases. It also develops veterinary legislation, prepares reports for international organisations, regulates livestock movements and supports the production and marketing of livestock and fishery products. Its administrative structure has included directorates responsible for animal health, animal production, fisheries and aquaculture, veterinary quarantine, extension, planning and livestock economics.

The ministry cooperates with organisations including the Food and Agriculture Organization, the World Organisation for Animal Health and the International Fund for Agricultural Development. The ministry's programmes have focused on veterinary training, disease control, domestic vaccine production, livestock exports and rural animal-production projects.
