= Ministry of Interior (Sudan) =

Coordinates: 15°36′34″N 32°31′56″E

Republic of the Sudan Ministry of Interior
- وزارة الداخلية

Agency overview
- Jurisdiction: Government of Sudan
- Headquarters: Khartoum (Sudan)
- Agency executive: Babiker Samra Mustafa, Minister
- Website: Official website

The Ministry of Interior in Sudan manages law enforcement and internal security, overseeing various police agencies such as the security police, special forces police, traffic police, and the Central Reserve Forces. For the first ten months after the 2019 coup d'état, police infrastructure was under civilian control.

== History ==
During the Anglo-Egyptian Condominium period (1899-1956), the Ministry of Interior was primarily focused on maintaining colonial order and security. It played a significant role in administering Sudan's vast territories, which included managing local governance and policing.

Following Sudan's independence in 1956, the Ministry of Interior's responsibilities expanded significantly. It became crucial in managing internal security, civil defense, and immigration control.

=== Human rights issues ===
Ministry of Interior was involved in significant human rights issues in Sudan included credible reports of unlawful killings, cruel and degrading treatment by the government, harsh prison conditions, arbitrary arrests, and political detentions. There were serious abuses in conflict zones, including killings, abductions, and physical abuse. Restrictions on free expression and media were prevalent, with violence against journalists, censorship, and criminal libel laws. Internet freedom was severely restricted, and there was substantial interference with freedom of association, including restrictive laws on NGOs. Government corruption was widespread, and there was a lack of accountability for gender-based violence, including domestic violence, sexual violence, child marriage, and female genital mutilation. Laws targeting LGBTQ+ individuals and the worst forms of child labor were also significant issues.

== Ministers ==
- 2025: Khalil Pasha Sayreen
- 2022: Ibrahim Haidan
- 2022: Anan Hamid Omar
- 9 February 2021: Ezzeldin El Sheikh
- 8 September 2019: Al-Tarifi Idris Dafallah
- 24 June 2025: Babiker Samra Mustafa
