= Ministry of Energy and Petroleum (Sudan) =

Government ministry of Sudan

Republic of Sudan Ministry of Energy and Petroleum
- وزارة الطاقة والنفط

Agency overview
- Jurisdiction: Government of Sudan
- Headquarters: Khartoum (Sudan)
- Agency executive: Al-Mutasim Ibrahim, Minister
- Website: Official website

The Ministry of Energy and Petroleum (MOP) (Arabic: وزارة الطاقة والنفط), previously known as the Ministry of Oil and Gas (Arabic: وزارة النفط والغاز); was the governmental body in the Sudan responsible for developing and implementing the government policy for exploiting the oil and gas resources in Sudan in 2017.

== See also ==
- Cabinet of Sudan
