= Kamil Idris =

Prime Minister of Sudan since 2025

His Excellency Kamil Idris
- كامل إدريس
- Idris in 2026

16th Prime Minister of Sudan
- Incumbent
- Assumed office 31 May 2025
- President: Abdel Fattah al-Burhan
- Preceded by: Abdalla Hamdok; Dafallah al-Haj Ali (acting)

3rd Director General of the World Intellectual Property Organization
- In office 22 September 1997 – 1 October 2008
- Preceded by: Árpád Bogsch
- Succeeded by: Francis Gurry

Personal details
- Born: Kamil El-Tayeb Idris Abdelhafiz; 26 August 1954 (age 72) Omdurman, Anglo-Egyptian Sudan
- Party: Independent
- Spouse: Azza Mohyeldeen Ahmed (m. 1985)
- Education: Ohio University; University of Khartoum (LLB); Cairo University (BA); Geneva Graduate Institute

Kamil El-Tayeb Idris Abdelhafiz (Arabic: كامل الطيب إدريس, romanized: Kamil Altayib 'Iidris; born 26 August 1954) is a Sudanese politician and civil servant who has been the 16th prime minister of Sudan since 2025. He previously served as Director General of the World Intellectual Property Organization (WIPO) from 1997 to 2008 and as Secretary-General of the International Union for the Protection of New Varieties of Plants (UPOV).

Educated in Sudan, Egypt, Switzerland, and the United States, Idris joined the World Intellectual Property Organization at the age of 28 in 1982. He became the Director General in 1997 and served for 11 years until 2008. He later left the WIPO and returned to Sudan to join politics. He was an independent candidate in the 2010 general election, coming in sixth place.

In 2025, amid an ongoing and devastating civil war, Idris was appointed prime minister by the Transitional Sovereignty Council under President Abdel Fattah al-Burhan. He thus became the first civilian prime minister of Sudan since Abdalla Hamdok's resignation three years earlier in January 2022.

== Education ==
According to a document prepared by the Office of the UPOV, Kamil Idris holds a Bachelor of Law (LLB) from Khartoum University, a Bachelor of Arts in Philosophy, Political Science and Economic Theories from Cairo University, a Master in International Law and International Affairs from Ohio University, and a Doctorate in International Law in 1984 from the then University of Geneva-affiliated Geneva Graduate Institute. Franklin Pierce Law Center in the United States awarded Idris an honorary Doctorate of Laws degree in May 1999. In 2005, Idris received an honorary Doctor of Letters from Indira Gandhi National Open University in India.

== Career ==
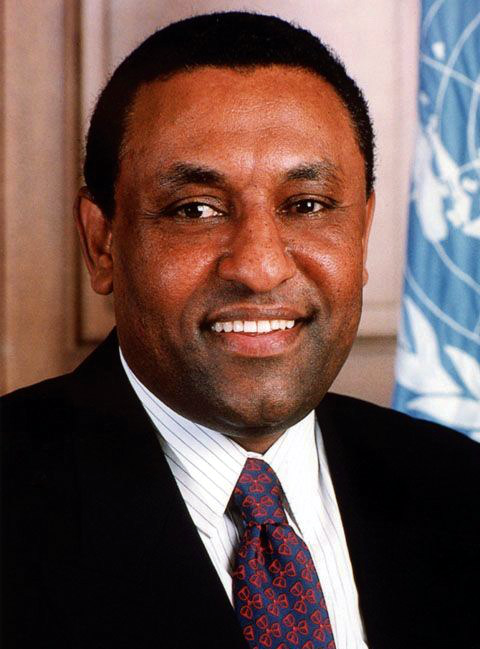
Idris in 1997

=== Diplomatic career ===
Idris joined WIPO on 30 December 1982. Idris was member of the International Law Commission from 1992 to 1996 and from 2000 to 2001.

On 22 September 1997, he was appointed Director General of WIPO for a period of six years. Idris succeeded Árpád Bogsch, who served as Director General for 25 years. The Director General oversees WIPO's efforts for global intellectual property protection.

In March 1998, Idris visited the United States Congress and met with the United States Secretary of Commerce to discuss safeguarding and promoting American ingenuity, and he received an official welcome by Congress. In 2001, Idris, along with Mihnea Motoc, signed a Program of Cooperation between Romania and WIPO.

He was formally re-appointed to a second six-year term as Director General of WIPO on 27 May 2003. The same year, he inaugurated the new Center For Intellectual Property at the University of National and World Economy. In 2006, Idris negotiated a cooperation program between WIPO and the Government of Azerbaijan.

Throughout his tenure as Director General, Idris donated his salary as Secretary-General of the Union for the Protection of Plant Varieties (UPOV) to developing countries. His mandate was originally due to end on 30 November 2009. A WIPO document released in 2016 indicate that in 2007, Idris requested that the WIPO Coordination Committee advance the process for appointing his replacement, whose appointment began October 2008.

In 2008, Idris went to Kyrgyzstan to meet President Kurmanbek Bakiyev and Prime Minister Igor Chudinov, where they discussed developing a digital library for the country.

=== Political career ===
After leaving the WIPO, Idris returned to Sudan where he joined politics. In the 2010 general election, Idris ran for the presidency as an independent, challenging then longtime President Omar al-Bashir, subsequently falling to sixth place.

In May 2025, in the midst of the civil war, Idris was appointed prime minister by the Transitional Sovereignty Council under President Abdel Fattah al-Burhan. He is the first civilian prime minister since Abdalla Hamdok resigned in 2022. On 1 June, Idris ordered the dissolution of the transitional government. On 19 June, Idriss has outlined plans for a 22 ministerial team, dubbed the Government of Hope.

In August 2025, Idris visited Egypt as part his first foreign visit as prime minister.

== Controversy ==
In 2006, a report conducted by WIPO's Internal Audit and Oversight Division at the request of the United Nations Joint Inspection Unit showed Idris's age had been misrepresented was the information was leaked to media outlets. Earlier WIPO records showed Idris's date of birth to be 26 August 1945, but he had attempted to change his records to show he was born on 26 August 1954. On 21 September 2007 the Secretariat of the WIPO called the report "a deliberate intention to harm [Idris]" and criticized the report's legitimacy and failure of the author to follow procedure which compromised its confidential status. Idris's birthday has been reported as possibly being 26 August 1945, 26 August 1953 or 26 August 1954.

During the 10-day WIPO general assembly that ended on 3 October 2007, a move to remove Idris from his position was blocked. WIPO came under fire for its credibility. Idris agreed to resign, and stepped down a year early from his post as head of WIPO.

In December 2016, it was reported that documents from WIPO dated in 2010 signed by the legal counsel of the organization, Edward Kwakwa, were released which show that Idris did not misrepresent his birth date.

== Awards and honors ==
Idris is an Honorary Fellow at Durham University in the United Kingdom. He also serves as an Honorary Professor of Law at Peking University and holds an Honorary Doctorate from Fudan University in China.

In 1999, Idris was awarded an honorary medal from the Moscow State Institute of International Relations for his work in intellectual property. He was also awarded an Honorary Doctorate from Moldova State University that year.

In 2001, Idris received the title of Doctor Honoris Causa at the University of Bucharest and was awarded the Grand Cross of the Infante D. Henrique from Portugal. Honorary doctorates from the University of Matej Bel as well as the Mongolian University of Science and Technology were also granted in 2001.

In 2002, he received the title of Doctor Honoris Causa from Ukraine in recognition of his contribution to the development of cooperation in the field of intellectual property. Idris was also presented with the Commandeur dans l'Ordre du Merite Nationale, the highest distinction of Côte d'Ivoire, for promoting social progress.

Idris, along with Georgi Parvanov, was awarded a medal by the National University of National and World Economy in 2003 for efforts in promoting economic development in Bulgaria. The Al Emam Al Mahdi University in the White Nile State awarded him an Honorary Doctorate in December of that year.

In 2004, Sultan Qaboos bin Said granted Idris with the Order of Oman, and the city of Venice, Italy also granted him the first-ever Venice Award for Intellectual Property.

Idris was decorated with the Orden de Aguila Azteca in 2005 for his work in Mexico's economic development. The following year, the African Regional Intellectual Property Organization (ARIPO) named its new regional intellectual property training center after Idris, and he received the title of Doctor Honoris Causa by the University of Azerbaijan. He also received the Order of the Two Niles.

Idris received honorary doctorate degrees from the University of Gezira and the University of Khartoum in 2007. The following year, the Kyrgyz State University of Construction, Transport and Architecture (KSUSTA) also granted him an honorary doctorate.

== See also ==
- Abdel Fattah al-Burhan
- Kamil Idris government

== Bibliography ==
- Kamil Idris, Michael Barolo (24 February 2000). A Better United Nations for the New Millennium. Springer.
- Kamil Idris (2003). Intellectual Property - A Power Tool For Economic Growth. World Intellectual Property Organization.
- Kamil Idris, Hisamitsu Arai (30 June 2006). The Intellectual Property - Conscious Nation: Mapping the path from developing to developed. World Intellectual Property Organization.

Positions in intergovernmental organisations
Preceded by Árpád Bogsch	Director General of World Intellectual Property Organization (WIPO); 1997–2008	Succeeded by Francis Gurry
