= Government of Sudan =

National government

The Government of Sudan is the federal provisional government created by the Constitution of Sudan having executive, parliamentary, and the judicial branches. Previously, a president was head of state, head of government, and commander-in-chief of the Sudanese Armed Forces in a de jure multi-party system. Legislative power was officially vested in both the government and in the two houses – the National Assembly (lower) and the Council of States (upper) – of the bicameral National Legislature. The judiciary is independent and obtained by the Constitutional Court.

However, following the Second Sudanese Civil War and the first Darfur genocide, Sudan was widely recognized as a totalitarian state where all effective political power was held by President Omar al-Bashir and his National Congress Party (NCP). Al-Bashir and the NCP were ousted in a military coup on April 11, 2019. The government of Sudan was then led by the Transitional Military Council (TMC). On 20 August 2019, the TMC dissolved, giving its authority over to the Transitional Sovereignty Council, who were planned to govern for 39 months until 2022, in the process of transitioning to democracy. However, the Sovereignty Council and the Sudanese government were dissolved in October 2021, when General Abdel Fattah al-Burhan seized power in a coup d'état, dissolved the Sovereignty Council, and reconstituted it the following month with new membership, keeping himself as chairman.

== Executive ==
Main office-holders
Office	Name	Party	Since
Presidency	Transitional Sovereignty Council Membership: Abdel Fattah al-Burhan (Chairman); Malik Agar (Deputy Chairman); Shams al-Din Khabbashi; Yasser al-Atta; Ibrahim Jabir Karim; El Hadi Idris Yahya; El Tahrir Abubakr; Raja Nicola; Abdulgasim Bortom; Yousef Jad Karim; Abdelbagi al-Zubeir; Salma Abdeljabbar	Military	11 November 2021
Prime Minister	Kamil Idris	Independent	19 May 2025

President al-Bashir's government was dominated by members of Sudan's National Islamic Front (NIF), a fundamentalist political organization formed from the Muslim Brotherhood in 1986. In 1998, the NIF founded the National Congress Party (NCP) as its legal front. the NCP/NIF dominates much of Khartoum's overall domestic and foreign policies. President al-Bashir named a new cabinet on April 20, 1996 which includes members of the NIF, serving and retired military officers, and civilian technocrats. On March 8, 1998, he reshuffled the cabinet and brought in several former rebel and opposition members as ministers. He reshuffled his cabinet again on January 24, 2000 but announced few changes. A government of national unity was sworn in on 22 September, with 16 members from the National Congress, nine from the Sudan People's Liberation Movement (SPLM) and two from the northern opposition National Democratic Alliance, which left the seats vacant in protest over how the posts were allocated. The Darfur rebels were not represented. Al-Bashir, as chairman of the Revolutionary Command Council for National Salvation (RCC), assumed power on June 30, 1989 and served concurrently as chief of state, chairman of the RCC, prime minister, and minister of defense until 16 October 1993 when he was appointed president by the RCC; upon its dissolution on 16 October 1993, the RCC's executive and legislative powers were devolved to the president and the Transitional National Assembly (TNA), Sudan's appointed legislative body, which has since been replaced by the National Assembly elected in March 1996; on December 12, 1999 Bashir dismissed the National Assembly during an internal power struggle between the president and speaker of the Parliament Hassan al-Turabi.

On April 11, 2019, al-Bashir was ousted in a coup led by Vice President and Defense Minister Ahmed Awad Ibn Auf, with his government then being dissolved afterwards. On April 12, 2019, Auf, who still served as Minister of Defense, handed power to Lt. General Abdel Fattah Abdelrahman Burhan, general inspector of the armed forces. Auf would also give up his position as Minister of Defense on April 14, 2019. On October 25, 2021, Burhan dissolved the Sudanese government and the Sovereignty Council which ruled Sudan in the aftermath of al-Bashir's downfall following another successful coup.

=== Ministries ===
Ministries include:

- Defense
- Education
- Finance
- Foreign Affairs
- Higher Education and Scientific Research
- Information
- Justice
- Oil and Gas
- Interior

== Legislative ==
The country was recently in a transitional period following the signing of a Comprehensive Peace Agreement (CPA) on 9 January 2005 that officially ended the civil war between the Sudanese Government (based in Khartoum) and the southern-based Sudan People's Liberation Movement (SPLM) rebel group. The newly formed National Legislature, whose members were chosen in mid-2005, had two chambers. The National Assembly (Majlis Watani) consisted of 450 appointed members who represent the government, former rebels, and other opposition political parties. The Council of States (Majlis Welayat) had 50 members who are indirectly elected by state legislatures. All members of the National Legislature served six-year terms. However, the National Legislature was dissolved during the April 2019 coup as well. Since February 2025, a Transitional Legislative Authority has performed the role of Sudan's legislature.

== Judicial ==
Supreme Court; Special Revolutionary Court.

== Legal system ==
The legal system is based on Islamic law; as of January 20, 1991, the now defunct Revolutionary Command Council imposed Islamic law in the northern states; Islamic law applies to all residents of the northern states regardless of their religion; some separate religious courts; accepts compulsory International Court of Justice jurisdiction, with reservations.

== Administrative divisions ==
Sudan is divided into eighteen states, each of which were governed by a governor and council of ministers, each member of each state of council of ministers were appointed by the president of the country. The elections of governors was different from others, the president picks three people who he decided will be running against each other, the one who wins at least 50% popular vote is the governor of that state. If no one wins at least 50% popular vote, the person with the fewest votes is disqualified from the campaign and they redo the election and then someone has to have at least 50% popular vote. State governments and their legislative councils were also dissolved during the April 2019 coup. The following are the states of Sudan:

1. North Kordofan (ولاية شمال كردفان Wilāyat Shamāl Kurdufān)
2. Northern (ولاية الشمالية Wilāyat ash-Shamāliyyah)
3. Kassala (ولاية كسّلا Wilāyat Kassalā)
4. Blue Nile (ولاية النيل الأزرق Wilāyat an-Nīl al-Azraq)
5. North Darfur (ولاية شمال دارفور Wilāyat Shamāl Dārfūr)
6. South Darfur (ولاية جنوب دارفور Wilāyat Janūb Dārfūr)
7. South Kordofan (ولاية جنوب كردفان Wilāyat Janūb Kurdufān)
8. Gezira (ولاية الجزيرة Wilāyat al-Jazīrah)
9. White Nile (ولاية النيل الأبيض Wilāyat an-Nīl al-Abyaḍ)
10. River Nile (ولاية نهر النيل Wilāyat Nahr an-Nīl)
11. Red Sea (ولاية البحر الأحمر Wilāyat al-Baḥr al-Aḥmar)
12. Al Qadarif (ولاية القضارف Wilāyat al-Qaḍārif)
13. Sennar (ولاية سنّار Wilāyat Sinnār)
14. West Darfur (ولاية غرب دارفور Wilāyat Gharb Dārfūr)
15. Central Darfur (ولاية وسط دارفور Wilāyat Wasṭ Dārfūr)
16. East Darfur (ولاية شرق دارفور Wilāyat Sharq Dārfūr)
17. West Kordofan (ولاية غرب كردفان Wilāyat Gharb Kurdufān)

== State and local government ==
Relations between the central government and local authorities have been a persistent problem in Sudan. According to the Interim National Constitution, each state had its own legislative, executive, and judicial organs. The state-empowered local government and state constitutions determined the organization and electoral procedures for local government. Each state was headed by a governor and a state council of ministers. The governor, together with the state council of ministers, exercised the executive powers of the state in compliance with the schedule of responsibilities set forth in the Interim National Constitution. Each state had its own capital and was divided into several localities or provinces, which, in turn, were subdivided into administrative units. Governors were elected in 2010, and they appointed their own ministers. All 15 Northern governors were from the NCP except for the Blue Nile governor, who was a member of the SPLM. Revenue flowed upward to the federal treasury. Some levels of government became so small, however, that they did not have a solid financial base.

== International organization participation ==
- African, Caribbean and Pacific Group of States
- African Development Bank
- African Union
- Arab Bank for Economic Development in Africa
- Arab Fund for Economic and Social Development
- Arab League, formally the League of Arab States
- Arab Monetary Fund
- Common Market for Eastern and Southern Africa
- Council of Arab Economic Unity
- Food and Agriculture Organization
- Group of 77 (G77)
- Intergovernmental Authority on Development
- International Atomic Energy Agency
- International Bank for Reconstruction and Development
- International Civil Aviation Organization
- International Criminal Court
- International Criminal Police Organization - Interpol
- International Development Association
- International Federation of Red Cross and Red Crescent Societies
- International Finance Corporation
- International Fund for Agricultural Development
- International Labour Organization
- International Maritime Organization
- International Monetary Fund (IMF)
- International Olympic Committee (IOC)
- International Organization for Migration
- International Organization for Standardization (ISO)
- International Red Cross and Red Crescent Movement
- International Telecommunications Satellite Organization
- International Telecommunication Union
- Inter-Parliamentary Union
- Islamic Development Bank
- Multilateral Investment Guarantee Agency
- Non-Aligned Movement
- Organisation of African Unity
- Organisation of Islamic Cooperation
- Organisation for the Prohibition of Chemical Weapons
- Permanent Court of Arbitration
- UNESCO
- UNICEF
- United Nations
- United Nations Conference on Trade and Development
- United Nations Economic Commission for Africa (UNECA)
- United Nations High Commissioner for Refugees (UNHCR)
- United Nations Industrial Development Organization (UNIDO)
- United Nations University
- Universal Postal Union (UPU)
- World Customs Organization
- World Health Organization
- World Intellectual Property Organization
- World Meteorological Organization
- World Tourism Organization (UNWTO)
- World Trade Organization (observer)

== See also ==
- Elections in Sudan
- Politics of Sudan
