= Idris (name) =

Welsh pronunciation of Idris

Idris is both a Welsh and an Arabic given name (usually masculine), also given as surname; the Welsh and Arabic names are not related and have two different etymologies.

Welsh: 'Ardent lord', from udd (lord, prince) + ris (ardent, enthusiastic, impulsive). It lends its name to the mountain Cadair Idris ('Idris's Chair') by way of Idris Gawr ('Idris the Giant'). The story of Idris Gawr is believed to have come from the monkish king Idris of Meirionnydd, who was slain in a battle with Oswald of Northumbria on the River Severn. This indicates that the name may well have been used in Wales before his final stand in 632.

Arabic (إدريس, also transliterated Idrees): Idris, the Islamic prophet mentioned in the Qur'an, usually identified with Enoch in the Bible. The original meaning may be "interpreter". The name Idris means studious, smart, or to learn in Arabic. The prophet Idris in the Islamic religion was a tailor and is believed to be the first person to write.

== Given name ==
=== Idrees ===
- Idrees Baig (1911–1986), Pakistani cricket umpire
- Idrees Bashir (born 1978), American football player
- Idrees Sulieman (1923–2002), American musician

=== Idris ===
- Idris I of Morocco (died 791), the first ruler and founder of the Idrisid Dynasty of Morocco.
- Idris II of Morocco (791–828), the son of Idris I
- Idris V (died 1699), ruler of the Kanem–Bornu Empire
- Idris of Libya (1889–1983), first and only king of Libya
- Idris Iskandar al-Mutawakkil Alallahi Shah of Perak (1924–1984), sultan of Perak
- Idris Murshidul Azzam Shah of Perak (1849−1916), sultan of Perak
- Idriss Aberkane (born 1986), French professor, author, and entrepreneur of Algerian descent
- Idris Abubakar (1955–2002), Nigerian politician
- Idris Ackamoor (born 1951), American multi-instrumentalist, composer, actor, tap dancer, producer, administrator, and director
- İdris Ağalarov (1917–1975), Azerbaijani opera singer
- Idris Ahmad, multiple people
- Idris Ali (politician) (1950–2024), Indian politician
- Idris Ali (writer) (1940–2010), Egyptian-Nubian author
- Idris Alkali (1960–2018), Nigerian army general
- Idris Alooma (died 1603), ruler of the Kanem–Bornu Empire
- Idris Assani, Beninese mathematician
- Idris Azad (born 1969), Pakistani author, philosopher, novelist, poet, dramatist, and columnist
- İdris Bal (born 1968), Turkish politician and academic
- İdris Baluken (born 1976), Turkish-Kurdish politician
- Idris Barzani (1944–1987), Iraqi-Kurdish politician
- Idris Bazorkin (1910–1993), Ingush-Russian writer, playwright, poet, and statesman
- Idris Bell (1879–1967), British museum curator, papyrologist and scholar of Welsh literature
- Idris Bitlisi (1457–1520), Kurdish religious scholar and Ottoman administrator
- Idris Cox (1899–1989), Welsh communist activist and newspaper editor
- Idris Davies (1905–1953), Welsh poet
- Idris Talog Davies (1917–1977), British judge
- Idris Imad al-Din (1392–1468), Arab Islamic leader
- Idris Elba (born 1972), English actor, DJ, rapper, and producer
- Idris Foster (1911–1984), Welsh scholar
- Idris Gaibov, Russian-Chechen politician
- Idris Garba (born 1947), Nigerian politician
- Idris Gawr, "Idris the Giant" (560–632), a king of Meirionnydd in early medieval Wales, traditionally also an astronomer
- Idris Muhammad Gobir (born 1976), Nigerian politician
- Idris Goodwin, American playwright, rapper, essayist, and poet
- İdris Güllüce (born 1950), Turkish civil engineer and politician
- Idris Haider (born 1964), Bangladeshi film director, producer, screenwriter, and actor
- Idris Haron (born 1966), Malaysian politician
- Idris ibn Hasan (1567–1625), Emir of Mecca and ruler of the Hejaz
- Idris Hopkins (1910–1994), Welsh footballer
- Idris Ibn Idris (born 1991), Mexican basketball player
- Idris Ingilabli (born 2001), Azerbaijani footballer
- Idris Jala (born 1958), Malaysian politician and technocrat
- Idris Ibrahim Jamil (born 1959), Sudanese lawyer and politician
- Idris Jamma' (1922–1980), Sudanese poet
- Idris Shaaba Jimada (born 1984), Nigerian academic
- Idris Jones (born 1943), English-born Anglican bishop of the Scottish Episcopal Church
- Idris Jones (chemist) (1900–1971), Welsh industrial chemist and rugby union player
- Idris Jusoh (born 1955), Malaysian politician
- Idris Kadded (born 1998), French footballer
- Idris Anarbekovich Kadyrkulov (born 1971), Kyrgyz diplomat and statesman
- Idris Kandhlavi (1899–1974), Pakistani Islamic scholar
- Idris Kanu (born 1999), British-Sierra Leonean footballer
- Idris Garba Kareka, Nigerian politician
- Idris Abdul Karim (born 1976), Malaysian footballer
- Idris III Katagarmabe (died 1525), ruler of the Kanem–Bornu Empire
- Idris Khan (born 1978), British artist
- Idris Khattak (born 1963), Pakistani human rights activist who has been missing since 2019
- Idris Khaybulaev (1915–1984), Crimean Tatar army officer
- İdris Küçükömer (1925–1987), Turkish academic, philosopher and economist
- Idris Legbo Kutigi (1939–2018), Nigerian lawyer and jurist
- Idris Hasan Latif (1923–2018), Indian Air Force officer
- Idris Lewis (1889–1952), Welsh conductor and composer
- Idris al-Ma'mun (died 1232), Almohad caliph
- Idris Mbombo (born 1996), Congolese footballer
- Idris Ahmed Mia (1894–1966), Bangladeshi politician
- Idris Miles (1908–1983), Welsh footballer
- Idris El Mizouni (born 2000), French-Tunisian footballer
- Idris Mohamed (born 2003), Comorian footballer
- Idris Muhammad (1939–2014), American jazz drummer
- Idris Naikwadi (born 1964), Indian politician
- Idris I Nikalemi (died 1353), ruler of the Kanem–Bornu Empire
- Idris Nuradeen (born 2002), Nigerian footballer
- Idris Odutayo (born 2002), English footballer
- Idris Olorunnimbe, Nigerian lawyer, entrepreneur, creative industry executive, and public administrator
- Idris Omar (1935–2024), Malaysian Islamic preacher and politician
- Idris Owen (1912–2003), British politician
- Idris Parry (1916–2008), Welsh Germanist, writer, broadcaster, and translator
- Idris Phillips (1958–2022), American musician
- Idris Price (born 1977), American football player
- Idris ibn Qatadah (died 1270), Emir of Mecca
- Idris Rahman (born 1976), English musician
- Idris Richards (1892–1962), Welsh rugby union player
- İdris Şahin (born 1964), Turkish politician
- İdris Naim Şahin (born 1956), Turkish politician
- Idris Hadi Salih (born 1952), Iraqi-Kurdish university president
- Idris Salman, Nigerian politician
- Idris II Saradima (died 1376), ruler of the Kanem–Bornu Empire
- Idris Sardi (1938–2014), Indonesian violinist
- Idris Seabright (1911–1995), pseudonym of American author Margaret St. Clair
- Idris bin Abdullah al-Senussi (born 1957), Libyan royal claimant
- Idries Shah or Idris Shah (1926–1996), author and teacher in the Sufi tradition
- Idris Sufyani (born 1995), Saudi Arabian para athlete
- Idris Suleymanov (1915–1986), Azerbaijani Soviet Army officer
- Idris Sultan (born 1993), Tanzanian actor, writer, producer, and brand influencer
- Idris Abdul'aziz Dutsen Tanshi (1957–2025), Nigerian Islamic scholar
- Idris Tarangzai (1961–2026), Pakistani Islamic scholar and politician
- İdris Nebi Taşkan (born 1997), Turkish actor and basketball player
- Idris Towill (1909–1988), Welsh dual-code rugby player
- Idris Umayev (born 1999), Russian footballer
- Idris Wada (born 1950), Nigerian pilot and politician
- Idris Abdul Wakil (1925–2000), Zanzibarian politician
- Idris al-Wathiq (died 1269), Almohad caliph
- Idris Waziri (born 1952), Nigerian politician
- Idris Galcia Welsh (1906–1996), birthname of Canadian-American explorer, author, filmmaker and aviator Aloha Wanderwell
- Idris Williams (1836–1894), Welsh educationalist
- Idris Williams (trade unionist) (1895–1960), Australian politician, political prisoner, and trade unionist leader
- Idris Williams (Welsh footballer), Welsh footballer
- Idris Zaynulabidov (born 1986), Russian footballer
- Idris Zubairu, Nigerian Anglican bishop

=== Nickname ===
- Joni Hendrawan or Idris, Indonesian member of Jemaah Islamiyah
- Howell Idris (1842–1925) Welsh politician born Thomas Howell Williams. (Also Idris, a brand of ginger beer, originally made by Howell Idris's company)

== Surname ==
- Abdulla Idrees (born 1999), Emirati football player
- Alimcan Idris (1887–1959), Tatar theologian
- Damson Idris (born 1991), English actor
- Denise Idris Jones (1950–2020), Welsh Labour politician
- Fahmi Idris (1943–2022), Indonesian politician
- Jamal Idris (born 1990), Australian professional rugby league footballer
- Kamil Idris (born 1954), Sudanese politician
- Mohammad Idrees (born 1993), Pakistani first-class cricketer
- Mohammad Idris (born 1961), Indonesian politician
- Muhammad Idrees, Pakistani politician
- Muhammad Idrees Dahri (born 1947), Pakistani Islamic scholar and writer
- Muhammad Idrees (footballer), Pakistani former footballer
- Muhammad Idrees (politician) (died 2023), Pakistani politician
- Najma Idrees (born 1952), Kuwaiti poet, columnist, and scholar
- Riluwan Idris, Nigerian para powerlifter
- S. M. Mohamed Idris (1926–2019), Malaysian environmental diplomat
- Salim Idris (born 1957), Syrian general
- Shaikh Idrees (1961–2026), Pakistani politician and Islamic scholar
- Suhayl Idris (1923–2008), Lebanese novelist, short-story writer, journalist, and translator
- Wafa Idris (1975–2002), Palestinian suicide bomber
- Yau Usman Idris, Nigerian nuclear physicist
- Yusuf Idris (1927–1991), Egyptian writer

== Fictional characters ==
- Idris, a.k.a. Red Idris, a main character in Jennifer Maiden's third novel in the Play With Knives series, Play With Knives: Three: George and Clare and the Grey Hat Hacker
- Idris, the TARDIS personified in the Doctor Who episode "The Doctor's Wife"
- Idris, in Mary Shelley's novel The Last Man
- Idris Campanula, a wealthy spinster, in Nagio Marsh's 1939 novel Overture to Death.
- Idris the Dragon, a Welsh dragon in the animated series Ivor the Engine
- Idris, an assassin in the mobile MOBA game Vainglory
- Idris is the name of one of the bedouins who kidnapped the main characters of Henryk Sienkiewicz's novel In Desert and Wilderness.

== See also ==
- Driss
- Iddris
- Idris (disambiguation)
- Idrisi (surname)
- Idriss
- Idrissa
