= Driss =

Driss or Dris is a masculine given name and surname of Arabic origin. Notable people with the name include:

== Given name ==
- Dris Mohamed Amar, Spanish politician
- Driss El-Asmar (born 1975), Moroccan footballer
- Driss Bamous (1942–2015), Moroccan footballer
- Driss Barid (born 1986), Moroccan hammer thrower
- Driss Basri (1938–2007), Moroccan politician, Interior Minister 1979–1999
- Driss Benhima (born 1954), Moroccan businessman
- Driss Bensari (born 1942), Moroccan professor
- Driss Benzekri (activist) (1950–2007), Moroccan left-wing political and human rights activist
- Driss Benzekri (footballer) (born 1970), Moroccan retired football goalkeeper
- Driss Ben-Brahim (born 1964), Moroccan-Austrian trader and investor
- Driss Ben Hamed Charhadi (1937–1986), the pseudonym for Larbi Layachi, a Moroccan story-teller
- Driss Ben Omar El Alami (1937–1986), Moroccan army general
- Driss Chraïbi, (1926–2007), Moroccan author
- Driss Dacha (born 1962), Moroccan runner
- Driss Dahak (born 1939), Moroccan civil servant
- Driss Dallahi, American cheerleader
- Driss Debbagh (1921–1986), Moroccan ambassador to Italy (1959–1961)
- Driss Fettouhi (born 1989), Moroccan footballer
- Driss Guiga (1924–2026), Tunisian lawyer and politician
- Driss El Himer (born 1974), French long-distance runner
- Driss Himmes (born 1983), French footballer
- Driss Jettou (born 1945), Prime Minister of Morocco (2002–2007)
- Driss Joumad (1927–2009), Moroccan footballer
- Driss Khalid (born 1999), French-Moroccan footballer
- Driss El Khouri (1939–2022), Moroccan novelist
- Driss Ksikes (born 1968), Moroccan journalist
- Driss Lachgar (born 1954), Moroccan politician
- Driss Lahrichi (born 1997), Moroccan swimmer
- Driss Maazouzi (born 1969), French 1500 metre runner
- Driss El Maloumi (born 1970), Moroccan composer
- Driss El-Mamoun (born 1962), Moroccan judoka
- Driss M'Hammedi (1912–1969), Moroccan politician and diplomat
- Driss Moussaid (born 1988), Moroccan boxer
- Driss Moussaoui, Moroccan professor
- Driss Mouttaqui (born 1956), Moroccan footballer
- Driss El Mrabet (born 1967), Moroccan footballer and manager
- Driss Mrini (born 1950), Moroccan film and television director, producer, and writer
- Driss Ouadahi (born 1959), Algerian painter and architect
- Driss Roukhe (born 1968), Moroccan actor and director
- Driss Seghir (born 1948), Moroccan short-story writer
- Driss Sekkat (born 1985), Moroccan-American television producer
- Driss Temsamani (born 1966), Moroccan-American author and community organizer
- Driss Trichard (born 1995), French footballer
- Driss el-Yazami (born 1952), Moroccan human rights activist

== Surname ==
- Messaoud Dris (born 2001), Algerian judoka
- Mohamed Driss (born 1944), Tunisian writer, actor, and director of theatre
- Rachid Driss (1917–2009), Tunisian diplomat and writer
- Youcef Dris (born 1945), Algerian writer and journalist

== See also ==
- Bordj Omar Driss, municipality in Illizi Province, Algeria
- Ouled Driss District, district in Souk Ahras Province, Algeria
