= Idrissa =

Idrissa is a masculine given name. Notable people with the name include:

- Idrissa Adam (born 1984), Cameroonian sprinter
- Idrissa Camara, Guinean-born dancer and choreographer
- Idrissa Camará (born 1992), Bissau-Guinean footballer
- Idrissa Coulibaly (born 1987), Malian footballer
- Idrissa Dione (born 1929), French boxer
- Idrissa Djaló (born 1962), Bissau-Guinean politician
- Idrissa Doumbia (born 1998), Ivorian footballer
- Idrissa "Idris" Elba (born 1972), English actor, producer and musician
- Idrissa Gueye (born 1989), Senegalese footballer
- Idrissa Halidou (born 1982), Nigerien footballer
- Idrissa Kabore (born 1977), Burkinabé boxer
- Idrissa Keita (born 1977), Ivorian footballer
- Idrissa Kouyaté (born 1991), Ivorian footballer
- Idrissa Laouali (born 1979), Nigerien footballer
- Ydrissa M'Barke (born 1983), French sprinter
- Idrissa Mandiang (born 1984), Senegalese footballer
- Idrissa Niang (born 1992), Senegalese footballer
- Idrissa Ouédraogo (1954–2018), Burkinabé filmmaker
- Idrisa Sambú (born 1998), Portuguese footballer
- Idrissa Sangaré (born 1987), Malian footballer
- Idrissa Sanou (born 1977), Burkinabé sprinter
- Idrissa Seck (born 1959), Senegalese politician
- Idrissa Sylla (born 1990), Guinean footballer
- Idrissa Thiam (born 2000), Mauritanian footballer
- Idrissa Timta (1942–2014), Nigerian traditional leader
- Idrissa Touré (born 1998), German footballer
- Idrissa Traoré (disambiguation), multiple people

== See also ==
- Edrissa
- Driss
- Idris (name)
- Idriss
