= Edrissa =

Edrissa is a masculine given name. Notable people with the name include:

- Edrisa Lubega (born 1998), Ugandan footballer
- Edrissa Marong (died 2023), Gambian long-distance runner
- Edrissa Sanneh (born 1951), Gambian-born Italian journalist
- Edrissa Sonko (born 1980), Gambian footballer

== See also ==
- Idrissa
- Driss
- Idris (name)
- Idriss
