= Gadik =

Gadik may refer to:

- Gədik, Azerbaijan
- Gadik, Iran, a village in Kerman Province
