= Mohamed T. El-Ashry =

Senior Fellow with the UN Foundation

Professor Mohamed T. El-Ashry FAAS FTWAS
- Education: University of Cairo; University of Illinois Urbana-Champaign
- Scientific career
- Fields: Water resource management Environmental resource management and development Energy policies
- Institutions: Cairo University; Pan-American-U.A.R. Oil Company; Environmental Defense Fund; World Resources Institute; Tennessee Valley Authority; Global Environment Facility

Mohamed T. El-Ashry was the first Chief Executive Officer and Chairman of the Global Environment Facility (GEF), and subsequently a Senior Fellow with the UN Foundation.

== Education ==
Mohamed T. El-Ashry obtained his Bachelor of Science degree in 1959 from the University of Cairo, and a Master of Science in 1963 and Doctor of Philosophy in Geology, in 1966, from the University of Illinois.

== Career ==
El-Ashry was a lecturer and researcher at Cairo University, Pan-American-U.A.R. Oil Company, Wilkes University, and the Environmental Defense Fund. After that, he became a Senior Vice President of the World Resources Institute (WRI) and as the Director of Environmental Quality with the Tennessee Valley Authority (TVA).

He later joined World Bank where he held the position of Chief Environmental Advisor (1991–1993), Chief Environmental Advisor to the President (1993–1994), and Chief Executive Officer and Chairman (1994–2003). From World Bank, he joined Global Environment Facility (GEF) where he became the CEO and Chairman of the organisation for eleven years (1991-2002).

El-Ashry research focused on water resource management, environmental resource management and development, and energy policies that promotes renewable energy.

== Fellowship and membership ==
El-Ashry was elected a Fellow of the Geological Society of America, a Fellow of the American Association for the Advancement of Science, a Fellow of the Third World Academy of Sciences in 1990, and a Fellow of the African Academy of Sciences in 2001, and a Senior Fellow with the UN Foundation.

He is a member of the American Academy of Arts and Sciences since 2012 advising on renewable energy, and a board member World Wide Fund for Nature, Resources for the Future, and Renewable Energy Policy Network for the 21st Century.

== See also ==
- Mohamed Thameur Chaibi
- Driss Bensari
