= Idris =

Idris may refer to:

== People ==
- Idris (name), a list of people and fictional characters with the given name or surname
- Idris (prophet), Islamic prophet in the Qur'an, traditionally identified with Enoch, an ancestor of Noah in the Bible
- Idris Gawr or Idris the Giant (c. 560–632), Welsh king
- Idris I Nikalemi, 14th century King of Chad
- Idris of Libya (1889–1983), King of Libya
- Idris I of Morocco (745–791), Emir of Morocco
- Idris II of Morocco (791–828), Emir of Morocco and founder of the Idrisid dynasty in Morocco, son of the above
- Edrissa Sanneh, Italian television personality known as Idris

== Technology ==
- Idris (programming language), a functional programming language with dependent types
- Idris (operating system), a multi-tasking, Unix-like, multi-user, real-time operating system

== Other uses ==
- Idris (genus), a genus of parasitic wasps
- Idris, a brand of ginger beer produced by Britvic
- Idris the Dragon, the singing dragon in the 1970s UK children's program Ivor the Engine
- Idris, a North Atlantic basin tropical cyclone name to be used beginning in the 2028 Atlantic hurricane season
- RAF Idris, an airport in Libya also called RAF Castel Benito

== See also ==
- Cadair Idris, a mountain in Gwynedd, Wales, meaning "Chair of Idris [the Giant]"
- Driss
- Iblis (disambiguation)
- Iddris
- Idrisi (disambiguation)
  - Idrisi (surname)
- Idriss
