= Steven Sonntag =

American cheerleader

- Education: Dean College
- Occupations: Cheerleader; Dancer
- Career
- Former groups: New England Patriots Cheerleaders

Steven Sonntag is an American dancer and a former professional cheerleader. In 2019, he became one of the first male dancers to join the New England Patriots Cheerleaders since the 1980s.

== Early life and education ==
Sonntag is from Colchester, Vermont. He graduated from Dean College with a degree in dance in 2019. While at Dean College, Sonntag founded the Dean College Pom Team, a competitive dance team that performs at events on campus.

== Career ==
Sonntag works as a school administrator.

=== Cheerleading ===
Sonntag made the New England Patriots Cheerleaders, becoming one of the first two men, alongside Driss Dallahi, to make the team since the 1980s.

He made the team for a third year in the 2022-2023 season.

== Personal life ==
Sonntag is gay.

== See also ==
- Parker West
