= Zubairu =

Zubairu is a Nigerian surname. Notable people with the surname include:

- Abdul Zubairu (born 1998), Nigerian footballer
- Idris Zubairu, Anglican bishop in Nigeria
- Tanko Zubairu, 20th century Nigerian military administrator
