= Idrisi =

Idrisi may refer to:

- Muhammad al-Idrisi, 12th-century explorer, geographer and writer
- IDRISI, a GIS computer program
- İdrisqışlaq, Azerbaijan, also spelled Idrisi, a village
- Idrisid dynasty, the former ruling family of the Maghrib
- Idrisid Emirate of Asir, the former ruling family of the Emirate of Asir
- Idrisi Shaikh or Darzi, a Muslim community of India

== See also ==
- Idris (disambiguation)
