= List of Bangladeshi film directors =

This is a list of notable Bangladeshi film directors.

== Film directors ==
=== A ===
- Abdullah al Mamun
- Abdul Jabbar Khan
- Abdus Samad
- Abu Shahed Emon
- Abu Sayeed (film director)
- A J Mintu
- Akhtaruzzaman
- Alamgir Kabir
- Ali Zulfikar Zahedi
- Alamgir
- Amjad Hossain
- Ananta Jalil
- Animesh Aich
- Anonno Mamun
- Ashiqur Rahman
- Ashraf Shishir
- Azizur Rahman
- ATM Shamsuzzaman
- Anjan aich

=== B ===
- Baby Islam
- Badol Khondokar
- Badal Rahman
- Badiul Alam Khokon

=== C ===
- Chashi Nazrul Islam

=== D ===
- Delwar Jahan Jhantu
- Dilip Biswas
- Dipankar Dipon
- Dewan Nazrul

=== E ===
- Ehtesham
- Enamul Karim Nirjhar

=== G ===
- Gazi Mazharul Anwar
- Gazi Rakayet
- Giasuddin Selim

=== I ===
- Idrish Haider
- Iftakar Chowdhury
- Ispahani Arif Jahan

=== J ===
- Jakir Hossain Raju

=== K ===
- Khan Ataur Rahman
- Khalid Mahmood Mithu
- Kazi Hayat
- Kazi Morshed
- S M Kayum

=== M ===
- Hosne Mobarak
- Malek Afsary
- Masud Pathik
- Matin Rahman
- Meher Afroz Shaon
- Mohammad Mostafa Kamal Raz
- Montazur Rahman Akbar
- Morshedul Islam
- Menhaj Huda
- Mostofa Sarwar Farooki
- Murad Parvez
- Mustafizur Rahman Manik
- Mejbaur Rahman Sumon

=== N ===
- Nargis Akhter
- Narayan Ghosh Mita
- Naeem Mohaiemen
- Nasiruddin Yousuff
- Nurul Alam Atique

=== O ===
- Obaidul Huq

=== R ===
- Rezwan Shahriar Sumit
- Raihan Rafi
- Reza Latif
- Redoan Rony
- Rozina
- Ruhul Amin (Bangladeshi film director)
- Ruhul Amin (British film director)

=== S ===
- SA Haque Alik
- Salahuddin
- Samia Zaman
- Shafi Uddin Shafi
- Shahadat Hossain Liton
- Shahidul Islam Khokon
- Shahriar Nazim Joy
- Sheikh Niamat Ali
- Shamim Ahamed Roni
- Shibli Sadik
- Shihab Shaheen
- Sohanur Rahman Sohan
- Sohel Rana
- Subhash Dutta
- Sudhendu Roy
- Swapan Ahmed
- Syed Wahiduzzaman Diamond
- Shankha Das Gupta

=== T ===
- Tanvir Mokammel
- Tareque Masud
- Tauquir Ahmed

=== U ===
- Uzzal

=== Z ===
- Zahidur Rahman Anjan
- Zahir Raihan
