= Saïd Bouziri =

Tunisian human rights activist (1947–2009)

- Born: June 4, 1947; Tunis, Tunisia
- Died: June 23, 2009 (aged 62); Paris, France
- Monuments: Square Saint-Bernard - Saïd-Bouziri square in Paris
- Citizenship: Tunisian
- Occupation(s): Activist, accountant, bookstore owner
- Known for: Human rights and immigrant rights activism
- Title: Knight of the National Order of Merit (1 December 1994)
- Spouse: Faouzia Bouziri

Saïd Bouziri (June 4, 1947, in Tunis – June 23, 2009, in Paris), accountant by profession, was a human rights activist who was involved in several struggles related to immigration.

== Biography ==
The eldest of a family of merchants, Saïd Bouziri moved to France in 1966 as part of his studies. He studied in Lyon then in Paris. He joined a Maoist group for a while but quickly became convinced that immigrants should retain their political sovereignty and therefore found their own structures. This is what pushed him, in the context of the Six Day War of 1967 and May 68 to participate in the founding of the Palestine Committee which will become the Arab Workers' Movement in 1973. He also founded the Committee for the Defense of life and rights of immigrant workers.

In 1972, as part of the Marcellin-Fontanet circular, an expulsion order targeted him, as well as his wife, because of his activities. He then started a hunger strike to assert his rights which had a great impact. He was supported by various personalities including Jean-Paul Sartre, Claude Mauriac and Michel Foucault. A demonstration of support brought together more than 2,000 people and ended up winning the case.

Anchored in the Goutte-d'Or district, he founded a socio-cultural center on Stephenson Street and the activist radio station Radio Soleil Goutte d'Or in 1981. He participated in several movements for the defense of undocumented migrants.

Following the movement he participated in the organization of the March for Equality and Against Racism in 1983. Together with Driss el-Yazami, he created the Génériques association with for the purpose of preserving the history of immigration. He was also the national treasurer of Human Rights League (France) -LDH, for founding a structure in order to allow foreigners to vote in local elections.

A street square in Pariswas named after him in honor of his human rights accomplishments.
