= Iblis (disambiguation) =

Iblis is the name of The Devil in Islam.

It may also refer to:

== People ==
- Iblis, former singer with German black-metal band Endstille

== Other ==
- Count Iblis, an exiled alien who was rescued by the Battlestar Galactica and stirred trouble among its crew until he was ejected from the ship
- Garm Bel Iblis, the founder of the Rebel Alliance in the Star Wars franchise
- Iblis Ginjo, a character in the Dune franchise of novels by Brian Herbert and Kevin J. Anderson
- Iblis (film), a 2018 Indian Malayalam-language film
- Iblis, Indian Marathi-language television show
- Iblis, a Frame in the 2002 game Zone of the Enders: The Fist of Mars
- Iblis, a villain in the 2006 video game Sonic the Hedgehog
- Iblis, the name of a weapon in the 2004 computer game World of Warcraft
- Iblis, the name of the mightiest djinn the wizard Ad Avis tries to summon in the 1990 adventure game Quest for Glory II: Trial by Fire by Sierra On-Line

== Distinguish from ==
- Idris (disambiguation)
