= Londonderry High School =

Public high school in Londonderry, New Hampshire, United States

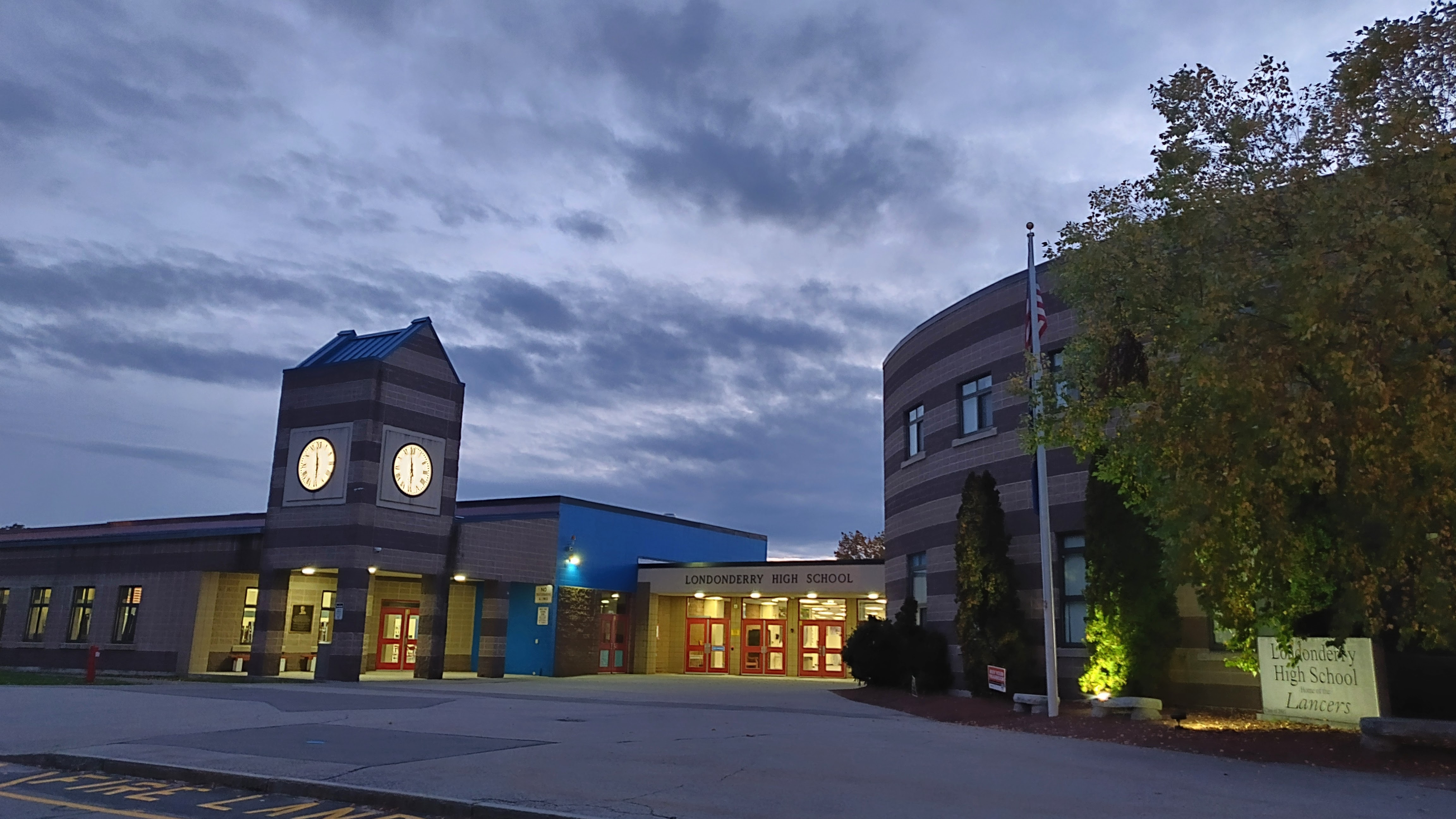

Location
- 295 Mammoth Road; Londonderry, New Hampshire; USA; 42°52′09″N 71°22′40″W

Information
- Type: Public secondary
- Established: 1978
- Principal: Rick Barnes
- Teaching staff: 107.60 (FTE)
- Grades: 9–12
- Gender: Coeducational
- Enrollment: 1,289 (2024–2025)
- Student to teacher ratio: 11.98
- Campus: Suburban
- Colors: Royal blue, scarlet and white
- Mascot: Lancer
- Nickname: Lancers
- Newspaper: The Lancer Spirit
- Website: lhs.londonderry.org

Londonderry High School (LHS) is a public secondary school serving grades 9 through 12 in the town of Londonderry, New Hampshire, United States. It is the sole secondary school in the Londonderry School District. It was constructed in 1972 as a junior high school and adopted its current role in 1982.

The school's campus is on a 135-acre (0.55 km^{2}) parcel of land in the center of town off of Mammoth Road (New Hampshire Route 128). The main building is 232,250 sq ft (21,577 m^{2}), and the separate gymnasium takes up an additional 52,000 sq ft (4,800 m^{2}). The current capacity is 2100 students; 1521 are enrolled.

The school is known for its large touring marching band. Its athletics teams compete as the Lancers.

== History ==
The original building was constructed in 1972 as a junior high school. In 1978, the town voted to create a separate high school for the town's students, instead of sending them to Pinkerton Academy in Derry, and Memorial High School in Manchester. The building then became a combination Junior/Senior High School. In 1982, a new junior high school was built nearby, and the original building adopted its current ninth through twelfth grade system. The school has received several additions, including a separate two-story gymnasium which opened in January 2003.

== Campus ==
Londonderry High School's property resides on a 135-acre (0.55 km2) parcel of land in the center of Londonderry, across Mammoth Road (New Hampshire Route 128). The main building is 232,250 sq ft (21,577 m2), and the separate gymnasium takes up an additional 52,000 sq ft (4,800 m2). Both buildings face Mammoth Road and are situated across the street from the Leach Library, Londonderry Police Department, Londonderry Town Hall, and the Londonderry Fire Department Station 1. The campus has 10 distinct sports fields, 2 ponds, 4 parking lots, and is interwoven with trails and footpaths.

== Demographics ==
For the 2020–21 academic year, Londonderry High School enrolled 1,432 students, according to the National Center for Education Statistics. The school employed 112.0 full-time equivalent educators, resulting in a student to teacher ratio of 12.8:1.

Enrollment by race and ethnicity (2020–21)
Race and ethnicity^{†}	Enrolled pupils	Percentage
African American	12	0.84%
Asian	32	2.23%
Hispanic	54	3.77%
Native American	2	0.14%
White	1,299	90.71%
Native Hawaiian, Pacific islander	2	0.14%
Multi-race	31	2.16%
Total	1,432	100%
^{†} "Hispanic" includes Hispanics of any race. All other categories refer to non-Hispanics.

Enrollment by gender (2020–21)
Gender	Enrolled pupils	Percentage
Female	668	46.65%
Male	764	53.35%
Non-binary	0	0%
Total	1,432	100%

Enrollment by grade (2020–21)
Grade	Enrolled pupils	Percentage
9	321	22.42%
10	379	26.47%
11	350	24.44%
12	382	26.68%
Ungraded	0	0%
Total	1,432	100%

== Administration ==
=== School district ===
Londonderry High School is the only high school in the Londonderry School District under the authority of School Administrative Unit (SAU) #12 of New Hampshire. The district's superintendent is Dan Black and the assistant superintendent is Jason Parent.

=== House system ===
Londonderry High School is administered through a house system, comprising four houses organized by last name. Each assistant principal is in charge of one house; however, they all help with the day-to-day running of the school.

== Academics ==
The school day at Londonderry High School is divided up into eight 47 minute periods (A-H). Classes begin at 7:20am and end at 2:14pm. The school offers many different accelerated programs, such as Project Running Start, which helps students transition into tertiary education or careers. AP and Honors credit are offered as well, which are weighted into a student's GPA.

=== Outcomes and reputation ===
As of 2018, the school had a graduation rate of 95 percent, well above the state median. Students tested in the top 20 percent for the state in reading and the top 30 percent in math.

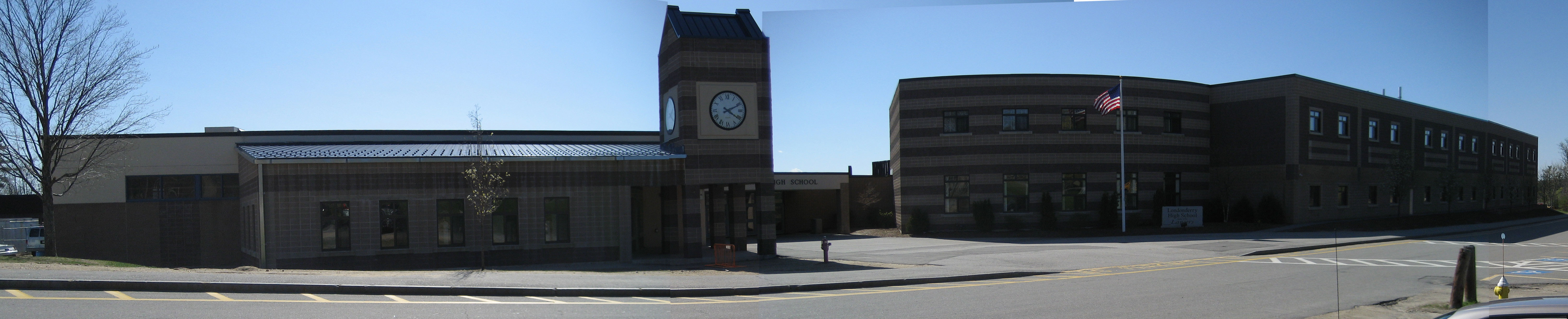
Main entrance to Londonderry High School

== Athletics ==
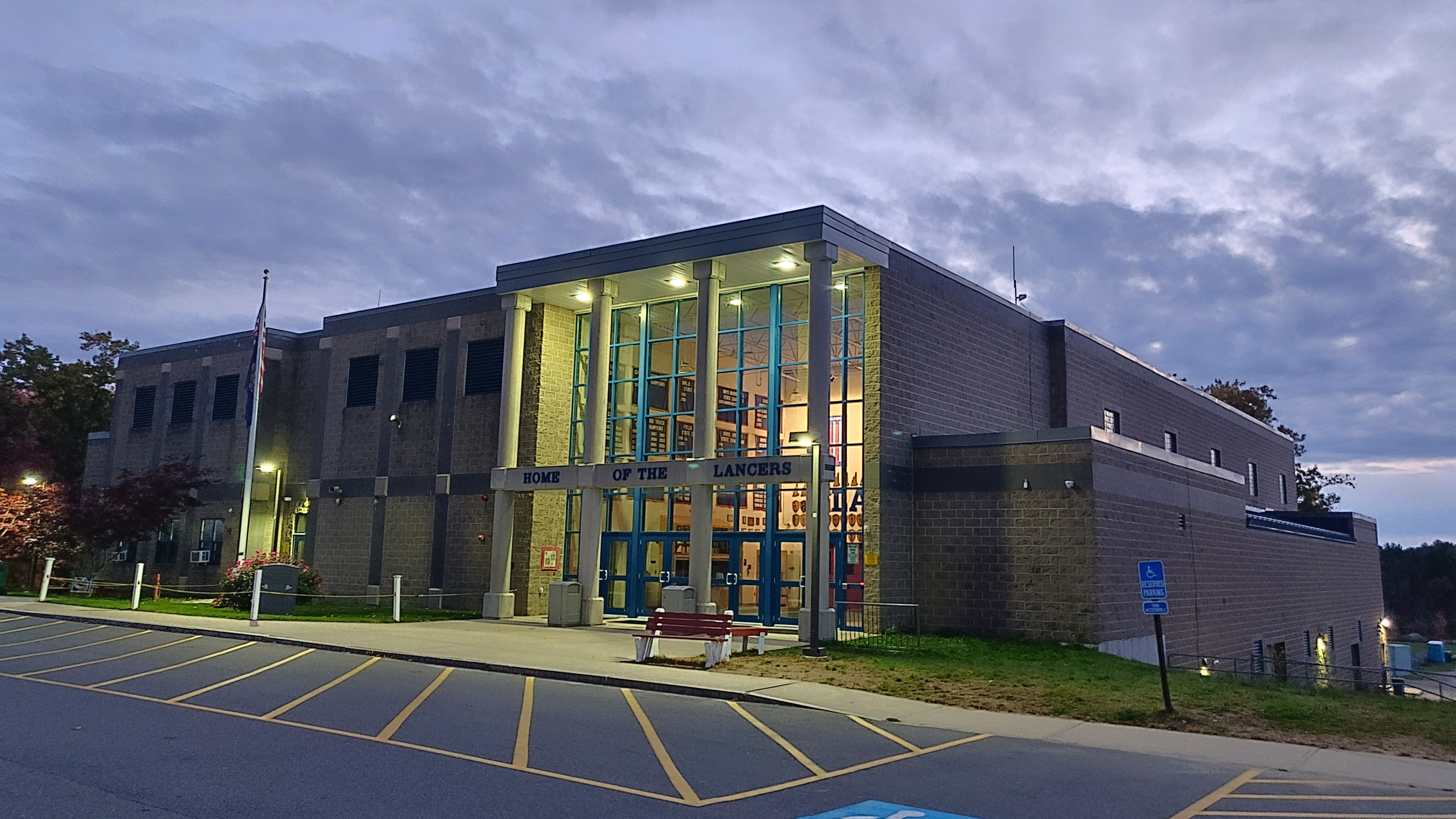
The school's gymnasium, built in 2003

Londonderry High School has 36 different athletic teams, ranging from the varsity level to freshman teams, and covering three sports seasons: fall, winter and spring.

=== Baseball ===
Londonderry High School's varsity baseball team won its seventh state championship in 2023. The team is coached by Brent Demas.

=== Cross country ===
Londonderry High School's boys cross country team has won more New England titles than any other team in the state. They are best known for their 1990-1999 campaign "Team of the 90's" with top runner John Mortimer who was ranked No.1 nationally in high school cross country.

=== Track and field ===
Londonderry High School's boys track and field team has totaled over 25 state Class L titles, indoor & outdoor, since the program was initiated in the 1980s. The program has produced four All-Americans and sent numerous athletes to NCAA Division I sports programs. Steve Carroll of the class of 2009 holds the state record in the 400 meter dash.

=== Soccer ===
Londonderry High School's boys varsity soccer team won Class L championships in 1990 (undefeated), 1996 and 1999.

=== Gymnastics ===
Londonderry High School's gymnastics team placed second in the state (2006–07) and then beat the state champions, Salem High School, in the New England Regionals, placing fourth (Salem placing seventh). The team also won the state championship in 2015, having a slight edge over Pinkerton Academy.

=== Tennis ===
Londonderry High School tennis won the state title in 2010 and 2012. The team is coached by Bill Knee.

=== Hockey ===
The Londonderry High School ice hockey team is coached by Mike Bears.

=== Lacrosse ===
Londonderry's lacrosse program has boys' freshmen, JV, and varsity, and girls' freshmen, JV, and varsity teams.

=== Football ===
Londonderry's football program has boys' freshman, JV and varsity. The team is coached by Jim Lauzon. The program won their second D1 football title in 2021 under Lauzon, their second in 3 seasons.

=== Rivals ===
The school's major rivals are the Astros from Pinkerton Academy in Derry.

== Activities ==
=== Marching band ===
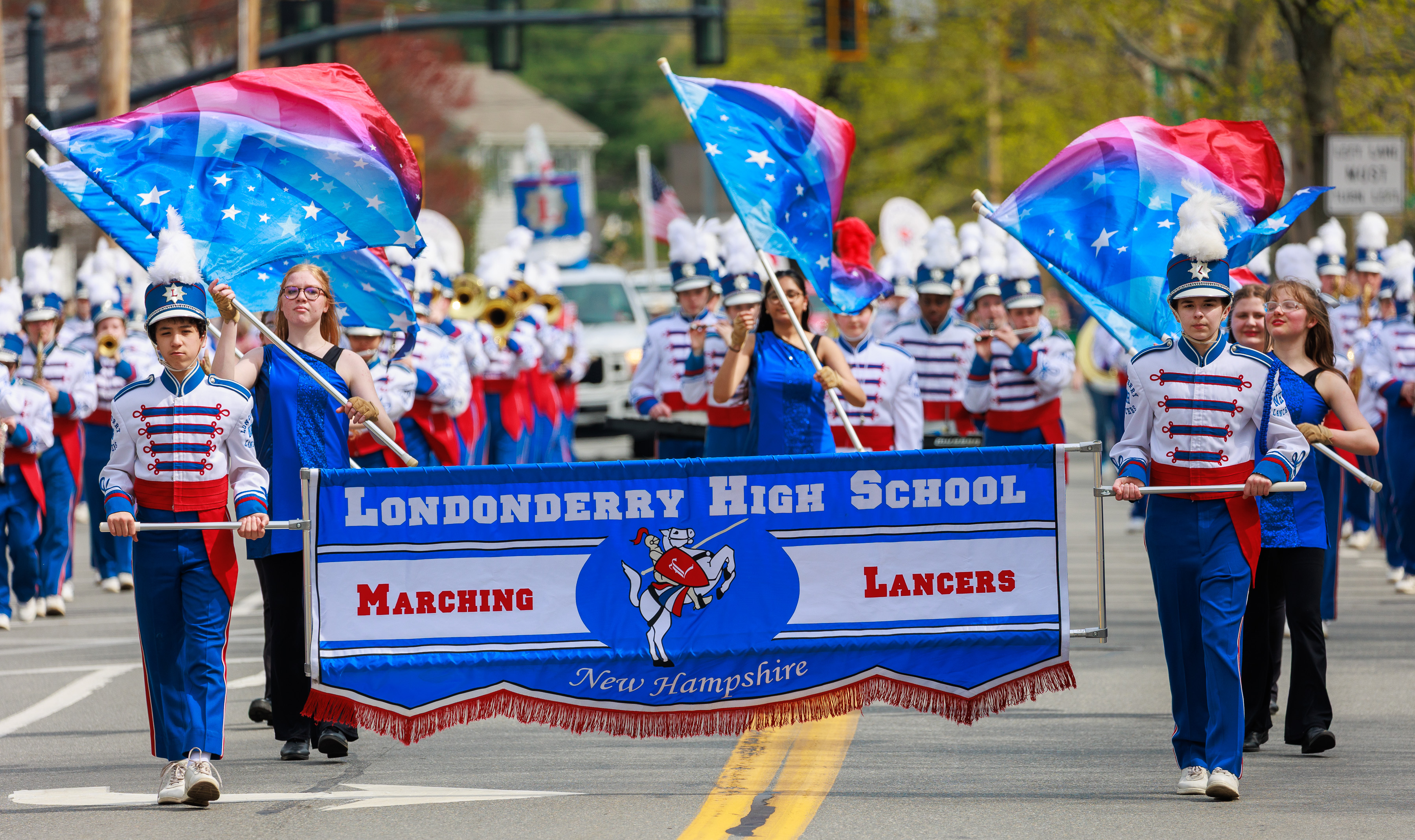
Lancer Marching Band at the 2025 Patriots' Day parade in Lexington, Massachusetts

Londonderry High School is particularly notable for its Lancer Marching Band and Colorguard, which is the second largest marching band in all of New England and the seventh largest east of the Mississippi River, consisting of 280 members. The Lancers have gained fame through performances across the country and around the world, including four performances at the Tournament of Roses Parade in Pasadena, California. On October 21, 2016, the band was invited to perform in the 129th Tournament of Roses Parade in 2018.

The band marches in the New York St. Patrick's Day Parade annually. In 2009 they were honored with an invitation to march in Ireland's St. Patrick's Day parade but graciously declined it and performed in New York for a 14th time. The Lancers participated in the pre-game festivities at the 2008 Summer Olympics in China when they marched on the Great Wall of China. The band has traveled to Washington, D.C. and marched in the 2009 and 2013 inauguration parades for President Barack Obama on January 20 and 21, respectively.

Notable performances:

- New York St. Patrick's Day Parade - 21 Performances
- Walt Disney World - 1988, 1996, 2001, 2006, 2013, 2015, 2019, 2022
- Orlando Citrus Parade - 2002, 2015
- Miss America Show us your Shoes Boardwalk Parade in Atlantic City, NJ. - 2002
- Washington DC St. Patrick's Day Parade - 2013
- Orange Bowl Parade in Miami in 1999
- Tournament of Roses Parade - 5 Performances
- Performance on Great Wall of China during 2008 Summer Olympics pre-game festivities
- Inauguration Parades for President Barack Obama in 2009 and 2013

=== Pantene Beautiful Lengths campaign ===
Londonderry High School holds an annual assembly, during which over a hundred students donate at least eight inches of their hair to Pantene Beautiful Lengths to help make wigs for cancer patients. Even after Pantene ended their campaign in 2018, Londonderry High School continues to hold an annual hair drive.

=== FIRST Robotics Team 1058 "The PVC Pirates" ===
Londonderry High School's FIRST Robotics Competition Team 1058 began as the "Dragoons" during the 2003 FRC competition season playing "Stack Attack". During the 2004 season, Team 1058 changed their name to the "PVC Pirates" due to their robot design resembling a sailing ship when fully deployed. This novel design is still remembered by many local FIRST Robotics alumni. Team 1058 has been to the FIRST Championship seven times in its nineteen-year history.

In 2012, Team 1058 won the Granite State Regional Chairman's Award, the most prestigious regional award, due to the team's significant outreach efforts. In 2014, Team 1058 won the Northeastern District Chairman's Award. In 2015, Team 1058 won the UNH District Chairman's Award.

In 2017, Team 1058 seeded first and captained the winning #1 alliance in the Archimedes division at the World Championship in St. Louis, MO, giving them the prestigious opportunity to compete alongside past world champions, and hall of fame teams on the Einstein Field. In 2019, Team 1058 won the District Chairman's Award at the UNH event after starting two FIRST LEGO League teams at the Londonderry Middle School.

=== Math team ===
The LHS math team placed first in the New Hampshire State Mathematics Competition in 1992–1993, 2006–2007, 2007–2008 and 2010–2011. The team finished 12th in the New England Mathematics Competition. The team, then led by Coach Mike Wenger, also finished second in the Tri-State Math League for the year's competition.

=== Quizbowl ===
Londonderry has a quizbowl team that participates in the Granite State Challenge television program. The team won the championship in 1984 under the leadership of James Choquette. In the 2006–2007 season the team advanced to the semi-finals before being knocked out by Hanover. The team also competes in the New Hampshire Quiz Bowl League and in 2007 finished first among at-large teams to make the playoffs, and placed fourth out of eight teams. The 2007-2008 team finished first in their division with a victory at their home meet. The 2021-2022 team made it to the semifinals of the state tournament.

== Notable alumni ==
- Ant, comedian
- Driss Dallahi, cheerleader for the New England Patriots
- Ryan Griffin, NFL tight end
- Alexxis Lemire, actress and model
- Brian Wilson (class of 2000), World Series Champion in 2010, former relief pitcher for the San Francisco Giants and Los Angeles Dodgers
