= Idris Ahmad =

Idris Ahmad may refer to:

- Idris Ahmad (footballer), Malaysian footballer
- Idris Ahmad (Perak politician) (born 1963), Malaysian politician
- Idris Ahmad (Selangor politician) (born 1948), Malaysian politician
- Idris Ahmed Mia (1894–1966), Bengali politician

== See also ==
- Idris Ahmad ʽAbd al Qadir Idris, Yemeni citizen held in Guantanamo Bay
