= Mudassar Naaru =

Pakistani journalist, poet and blogger

- Disappeared: August 20, 2018 (kidnapped by ISI in Pakistan); Kaghan, Pakistan
- Status: Missing for 8 years, 4 months and 20 days
- Occupations: journalist, poet and blogger
- Spouse: Sadaf Chughtai (died)

Mudassar Mahmood Naaru (Urdu: مدثر نارو) is a Pakistani journalist, poet and blogger. He has been missing since 2018. He was kidnapped by ISI in Pakistan.

== Disappearance and aftermath ==
Mudassar was reported missing from the Balakot area of Khyber Pakhtunkhwa in 2018, where he had gone with his wife Sadaf and six-month-old son Sachal for sightseeing.

In May 2021 Naro's wife Sadaf died of a heart attack.

In December 2021, Naro's parents and son met then Prime Minister Imran Khan, who ordered the submission of detailed report on Naro's "whereabouts and on exactly what happened [to him]".

== See also ==
- Idris Khattak
- List of people who disappeared mysteriously: post-1990
