= Gədikqışlaq =

- Municipality
- Location within Azerbaijan
- Coordinates: 41°17′N 48°42′E
- Country: Azerbaijan
- Rayon: Quba

Population
  - Total: 627
- Time zone: UTC+4 (AZT)
  - Summer (DST): UTC+5 (AZT)

Gədikqışlaq (also, Gyadikoyeydlyar and Gyadikseydlyar) is a village and municipality in the Quba Rayon of Azerbaijan. It has a population of 627. The municipality consists of the villages of Gədikqışlaq, İdrisqışlaq, and Gədik.
