= New England Patriots Cheerleaders =

NFL cheerleader squad

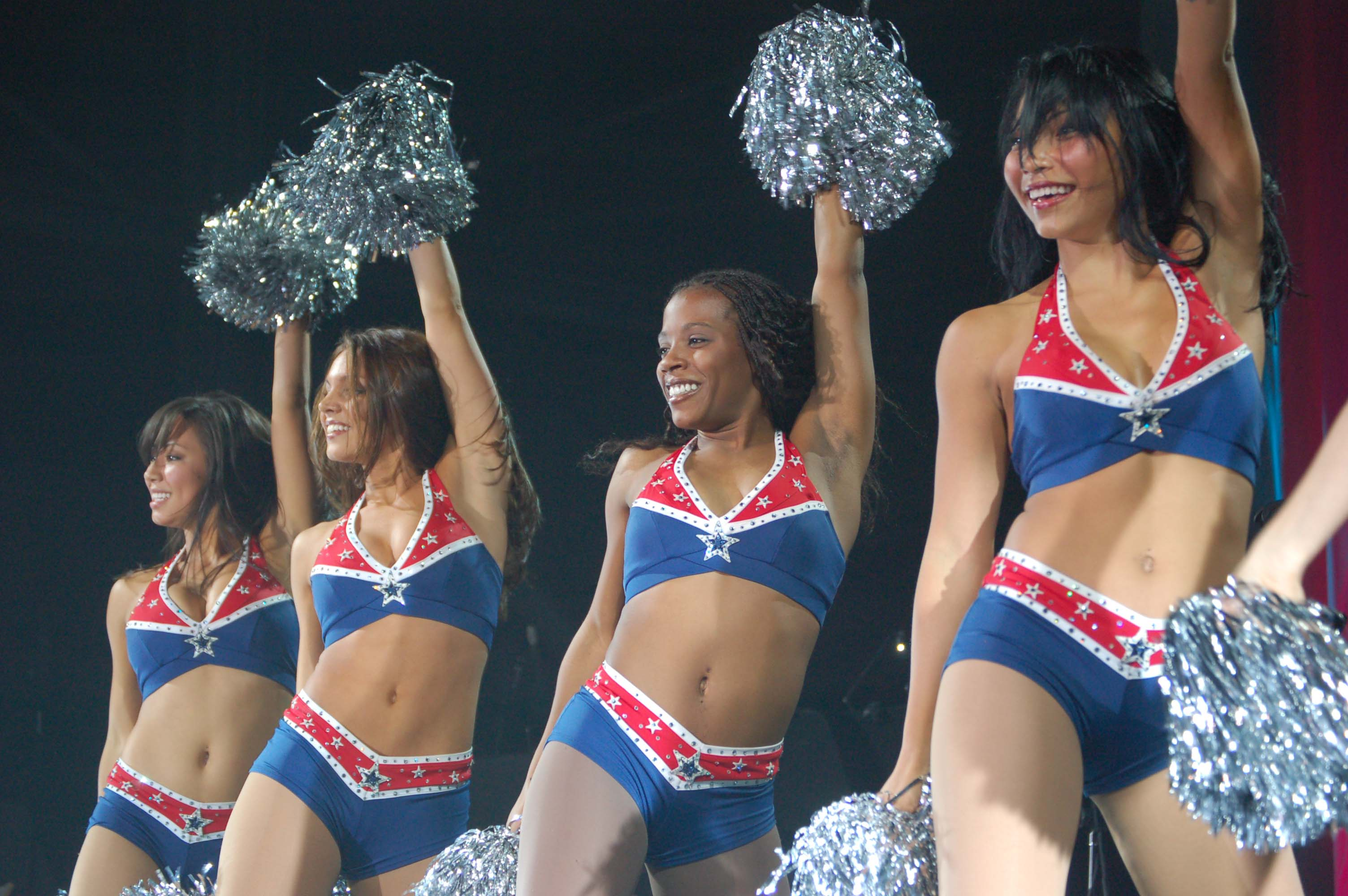
- New Englands Patriots cheerleaders at Incirlik Air Base in Adana, Turkey in November 2007
- Established: 1971; 55 years ago
- Members: 34 (as of 2018)
- Affiliations: New England Patriots
- Website: patriots.com/cheerleaders/

The New England Patriots Cheerleaders (NEPC) are the official cheerleading squad of the NFL's New England Patriots first formed in 1971. The cheerleaders also make appearances off the field and overseas with Patriots mascot Pat Patriot, and also has a Junior Patriots Cheerleaders, with girls of ages 7–17 being allowed to join. The New England Patriots Cheerleader also mentor the young girls by enriching their interests.

The team also releases a swimsuit calendar yearly. The Patriots Cheerleaders' auditions take place at Gillette Stadium. In 2008, the squad went to China to train Chinese dancers for the 2008 Summer Olympics.

== Notable cheerleaders ==
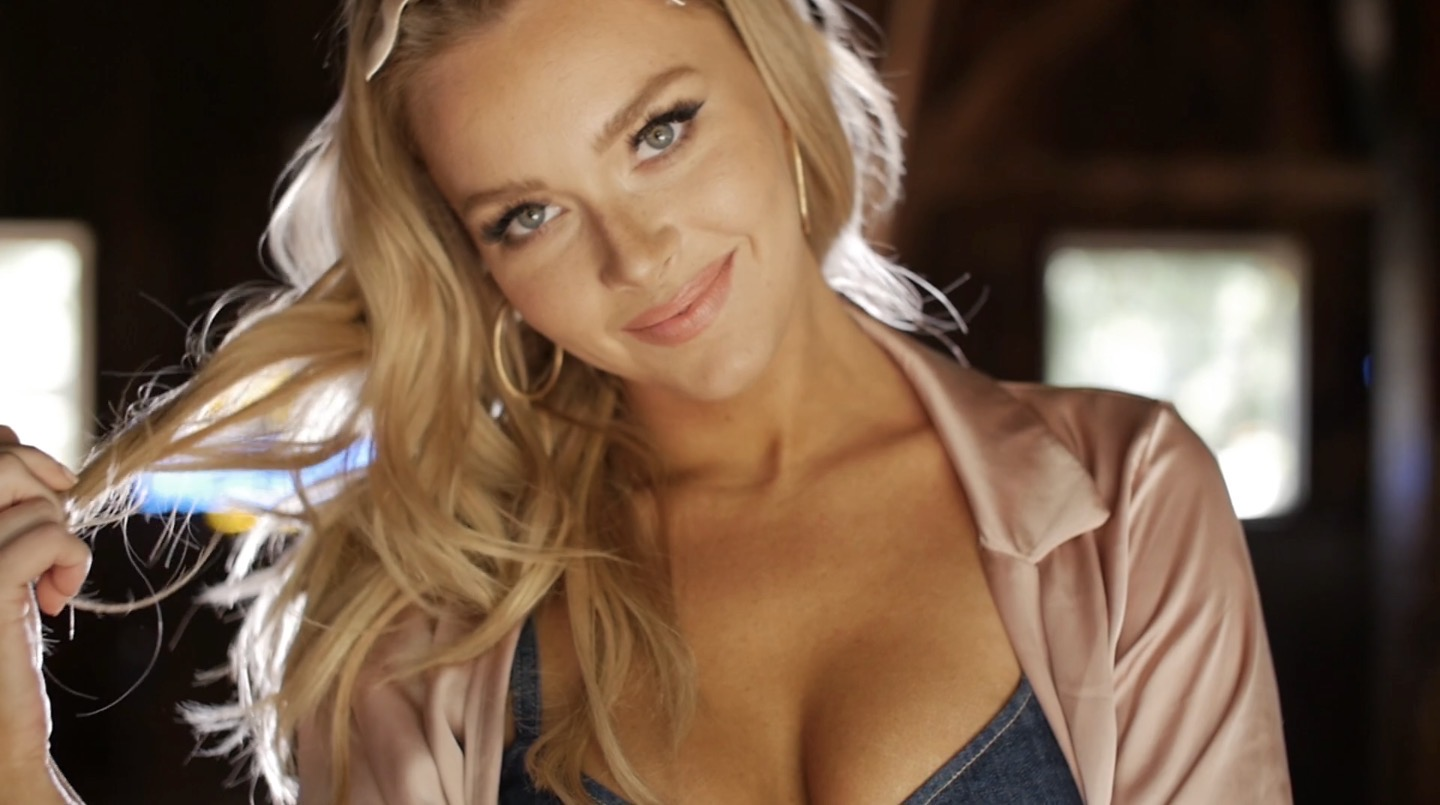
Model Camille Kostek started her career as a Patriots cheerleader in the 2013 and 2014 seasons

- Driss Dallahi (2019-2023)
- Camille Kostek (2013–2014), a model who was on the cover of the Sports Illustrated Swimsuit Issue and partner of NFL tight end Rob Gronkowski.
- Steven Sonntag (2019)
- Leah Van Dale (2007–2009), WWE wrestler

== Gallery ==
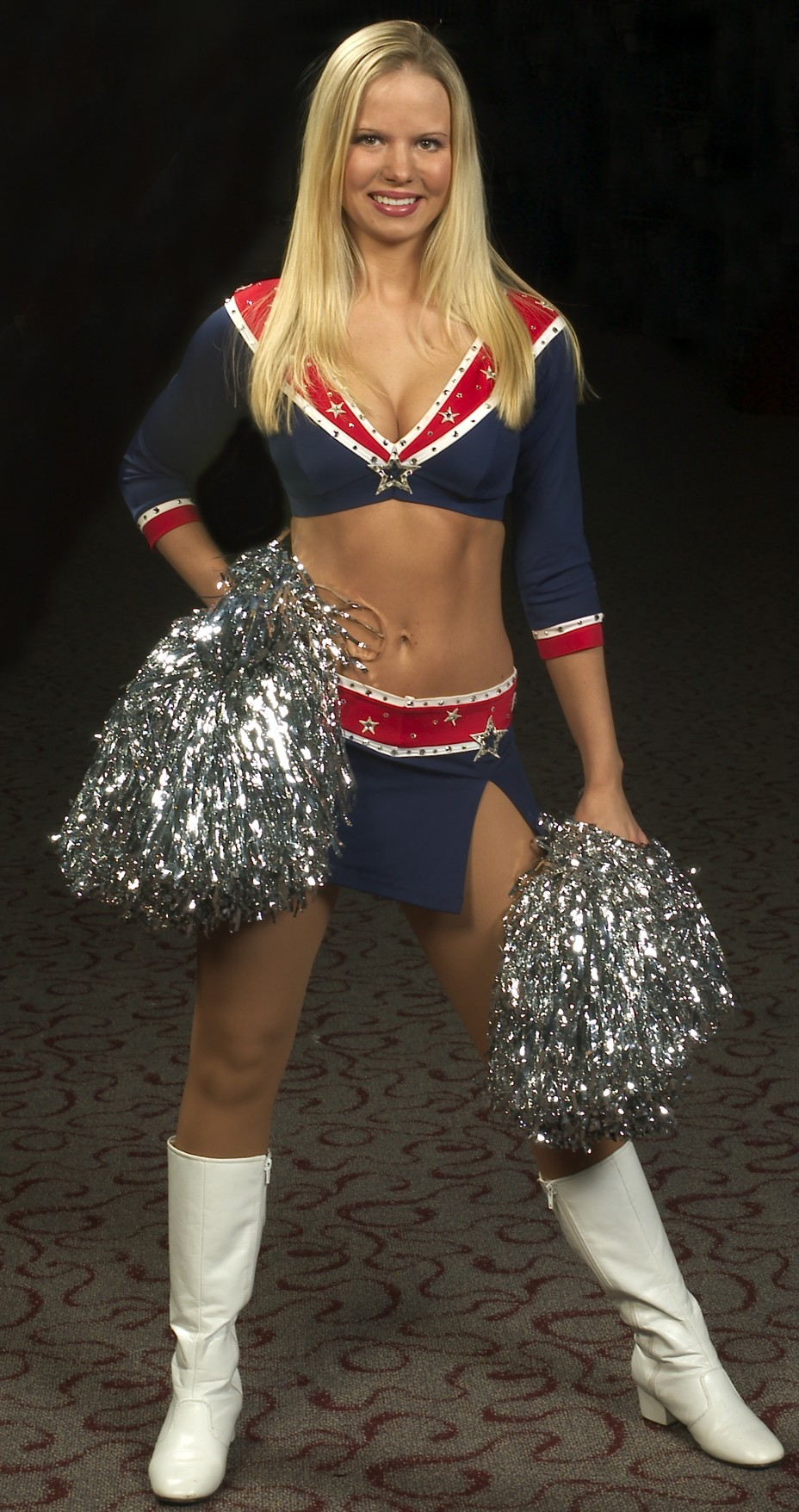
In the United Kingdom in December 2004

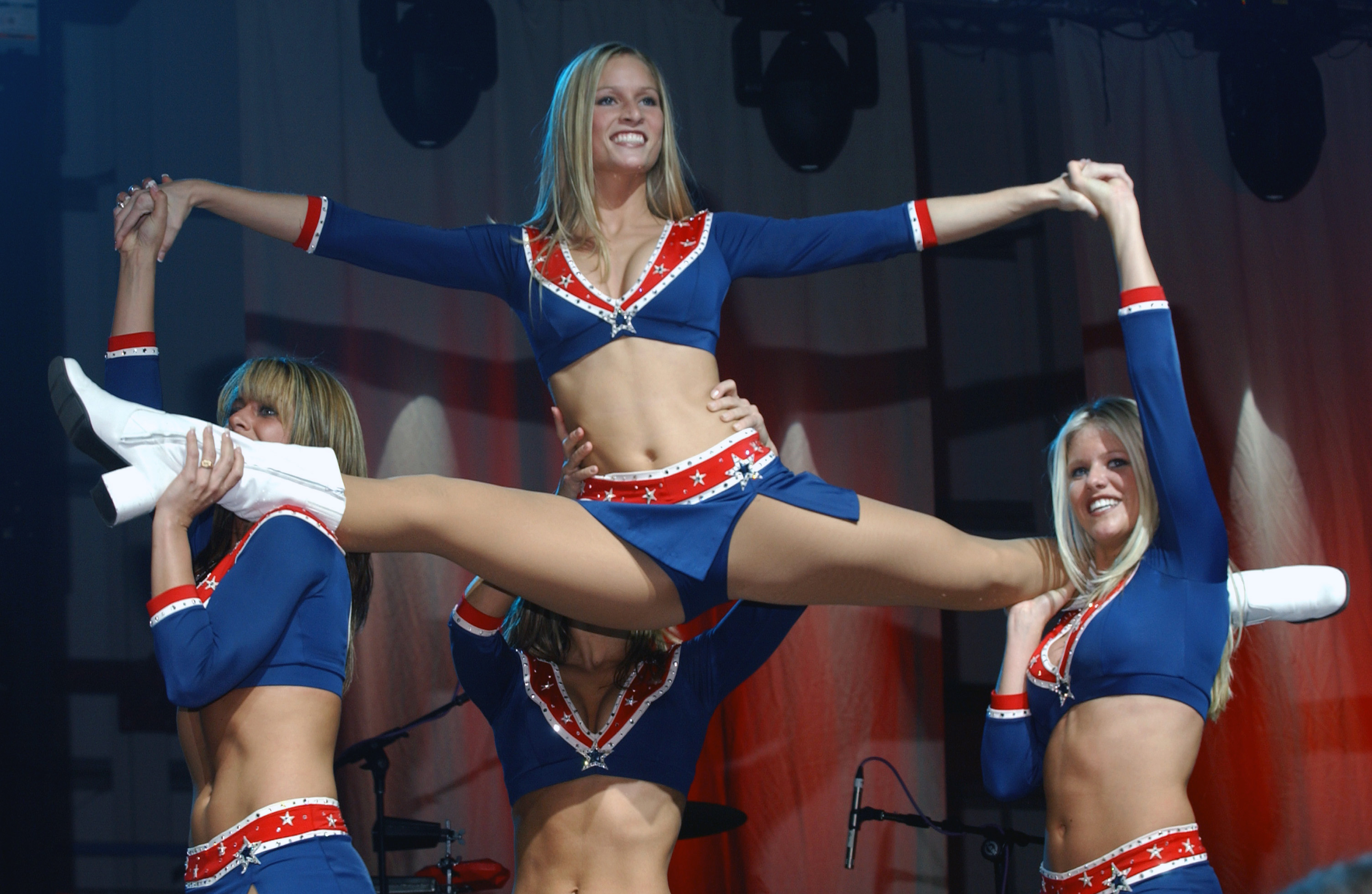
In the United Kingdom in December 2004

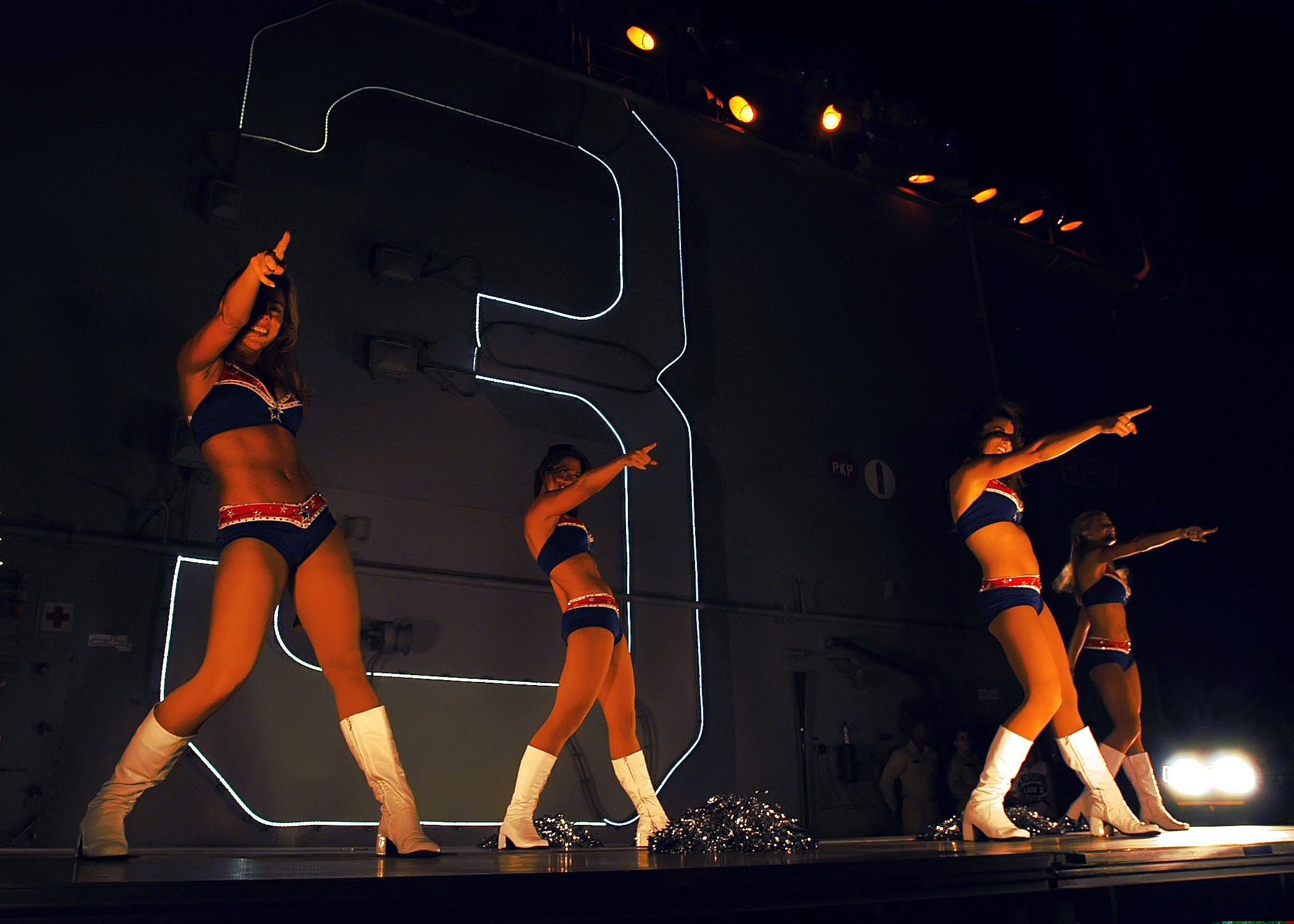
At the Persian Gulf in June 2005

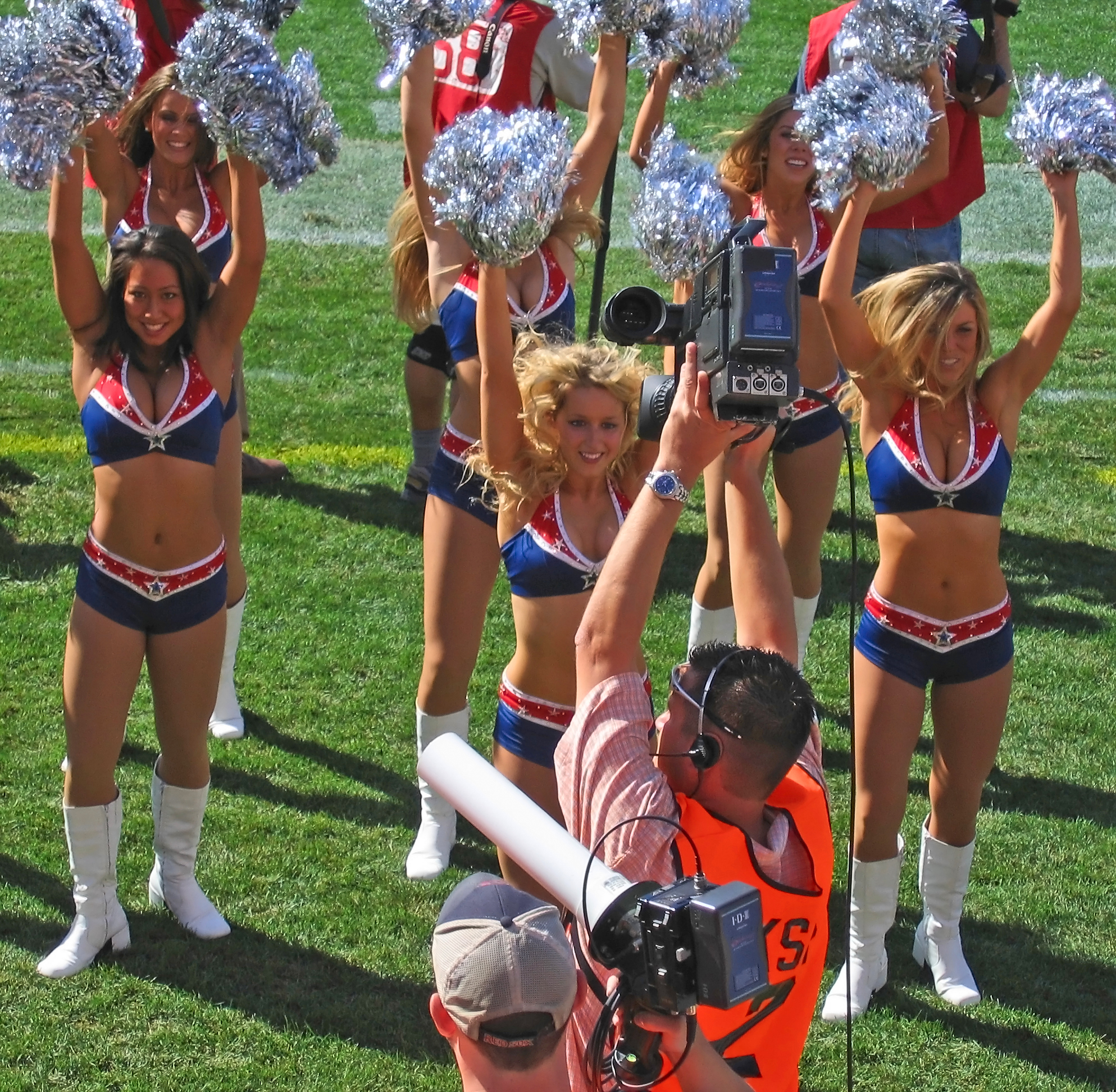
At Gillette Stadium in October 2005

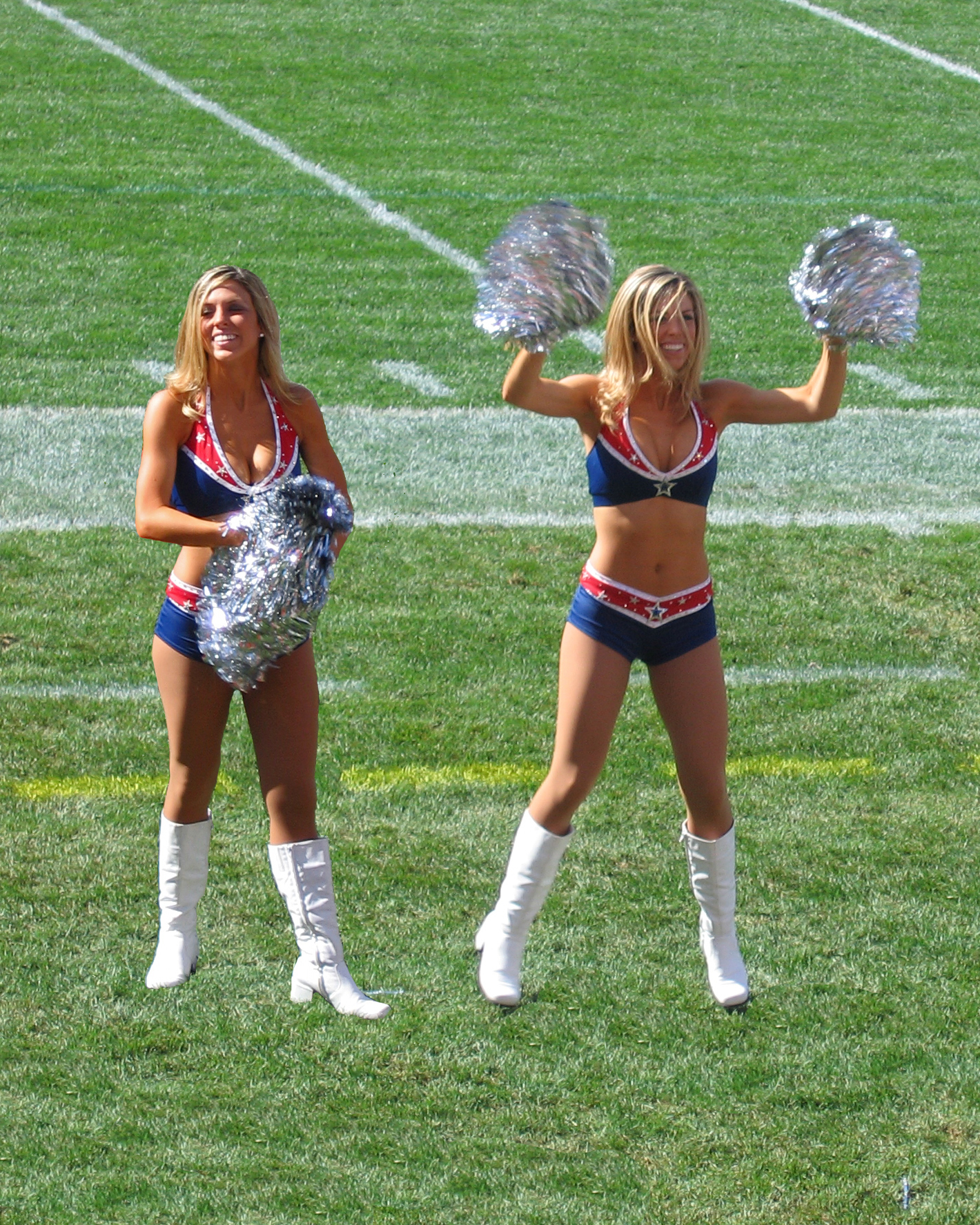
At Gillette Stadium in October 2005

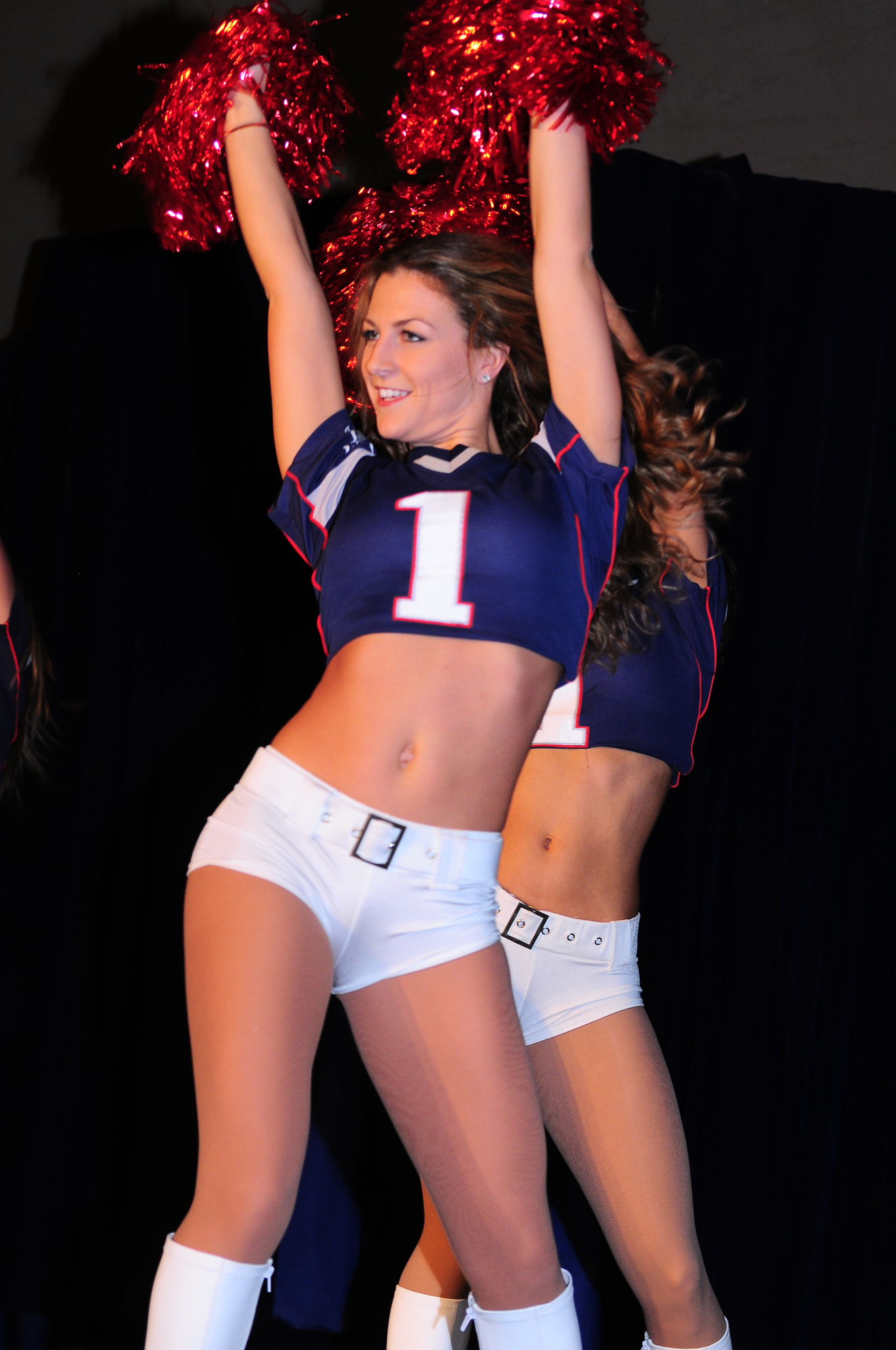
In Kyrgyzstan in December 2010
