= Global Environment Facility =

Multilateral environmental foundation for climate protection

- Formation: October 15, 1991; 35 years ago
- Type: Fund
- Purpose: Environment
- Location: Washington, D.C., United States
- Region served: Worldwide
- Members: 186 member countries
- Key people: Dr Claude Gascon, Interim CEO
- Budget: USD 5.25 billion (2022-2026)
- Website: www.thegef.org

The Global Environment Facility (GEF) is a multilateral environmental fund that provides grants and blended finance for projects related to biodiversity, climate change, international waters, land degradation, persistent organic pollutants (POPs), mercury, sustainable forest management, food security, and sustainable cities in developing countries and countries with economies in transition. It is the largest source of multilateral funding for biodiversity globally and distributes more than $1 billion a year on average to address inter-related environmental challenges.

The GEF was established ahead of the 1992 Rio Earth Summit and includes 184 countries in partnership with international institutions, civil society organizations, and the private sector. It supports country-driven sustainable development initiatives in developing countries that generate global environmental benefits. To date, the GEF has provided more than $22 billion in grants and mobilized another $120 billion in co-financing for more than 5,200 projects and programs. Through its Small Grants Programme (SGP), the GEF has provided support to nearly 27,000 civil society and community initiatives in 136 countries. In June 2022, donors to the GEF pledged a record $5.33 billion in support for its latest four-year replenishment cycle, which runs until June 2026.

In addition to funding projects through grants and blended finance, the GEF also serves as a financial mechanism for the following conventions:

- Convention on Biological Diversity (CBD)
- United Nations Framework Convention on Climate Change (UNFCCC)
- United Nations Convention to Combat Desertification (UNCCD)
- Stockholm Convention on Persistent Organic Pollutants
- Minamata Convention on Mercury

The GEF also supports implementation of the Montreal Protocol on Substances that Deplete the Ozone Layer (MP).

== Structure ==
The GEF has a governing structure organized around an Assembly, the Council, the Secretariat, 18 Agencies, a Scientific and Technical Advisory Panel (STAP), and the Independent Evaluation Office.

- The GEF Assembly is composed of all 184 member countries, or Participants. It meets every three to four years at the ministerial level to review general policies; review and evaluate the GEF's operation based on reports submitted to Council; review the membership of the Facility; and consider, for approval by consensus, amendments to the Instrument for the Establishment of the Restructured GEF on the basis of recommendations by the Council. Ministers and high-level government delegations of all GEF member countries take part in the meetings. The Assembly combines plenary meetings and high-level panels, exhibits, side events, and GEF project site visits. Prominent environmentalists, parliamentarians, business leaders, scientists, and NGO leaders discuss global environmental challenges within the context of sustainable development and other international development goals.
- The GEF Council is the main governing body of the GEF. It comprises 32 members appointed by constituencies of GEF member countries (14 from developed countries, 16 from developing countries and 2 from economies in transition). Council Members rotate every three years or until the constituency appoints a new Member. The Council, which meets twice annually, develops, adopts, and evaluates the operational policies and programs for GEF-financed activities. It also reviews and approves the work program (projects submitted for approval), making decisions by consensus.
- The GEF Secretariat is based in Washington, D.C., and reports directly to the GEF Council and Assembly, ensuring that their decisions are translated into effective actions. The Secretariat coordinates the formulation of projects included in the work programs, oversees its implementation, and makes certain that operational strategy and policies are followed. Dr Claude Gascon currently heads the Secretariat as Interim CEO.
- The GEF Scientific and Technical Advisory Panel (STAP) provides the GEF with scientific and technical advice on policies, operational strategies, programs, and projects. The Panel consists of six members, who are internationally recognized experts in the GEF's key areas of work. They are supported by a global network of experts and institutions. In addition, the STAP interacts with other relevant scientific and technical bodies, particularly with the subsidiary bodies of the environmental conventions.
- The GEF Independent Evaluation Office (GEF IEO) reports directly to the Council. It is headed by a Director, appointed by the Council, who coordinates a team of specialized evaluators. It works with the Secretariat and the GEF Agencies to share lessons learned and best practices. The IEO undertakes independent evaluations of GEF impact and effectiveness. These are typically on focal areas, institutional issues, or cross-cutting themes.
- GEF Agencies are the operational arm of the GEF. They work closely with project proponents—government agencies, civil society organizations, and other stakeholders—to design, develop and implement GEF-funded projects and programs. The GEF works with 18 agencies.
1. United Nations Development Programme (UNDP)
2. United Nations Environment Programme (UNEP)
3. World Bank
4. Food and Agriculture Organization (FAO)
5. Inter-American Development Bank (IADB)
6. United Nations Industrial Development Organization (UNIDO)
7. Asian Development Bank (ADB)
8. African Development Bank (AfDB)
9. European Bank for Reconstruction and Development (EBRD)
10. International Fund for Agricultural Development (IFAD)
11. World Wildlife Fund – US (WWF-US)
12. Conservation International (CI)
13. West African Development Bank (BOAD)
14. Brazilian Biodiversity Fund (FUNBIO)
15. Foreign Economic Cooperation Office, Ministry of Environmental Protection of China (FECO)
16. Development Bank of Southern Africa (DBSA)
17. Development Bank of Latin America and the Caribbean (CAF)
18. International Union for Conservation of Nature (IUCN)

== History ==
The Global Environment Facility was established in October 1991 under the chairmanship of Mohamed El-Ashry as a $1 billion pilot program in the World Bank to enable developing countries to take action on environmental challenges and to promote sustainable development. The GEF would provide new and additional grants and concessional funding to cover the "incremental" or additional costs associated with transforming a project with national benefits into one with global environmental benefits.

The United Nations Development Programme, the United Nations Environment Programme, and the World Bank were the three initial partners implementing GEF projects.

In 1992, at the Rio Earth Summit, the GEF was restructured and established as a permanent, separate institution. The decision to make the GEF an independent organization enhanced the involvement of developing countries in the decision-making process and in implementation of the projects. Since 1994, the World Bank has served as the Trustee of the GEF Trust Fund and provides administrative services.

As part of the restructuring, the GEF was entrusted to become the financial mechanism for both the UN Convention on Biological Diversity and the UN Framework Convention on Climate Change. In partnership with The Montreal Protocol on Substances that Deplete the Ozone Layer, the GEF started funding projects that enable the Russian Federation and nations in Eastern Europe and Central Asia to phase out their use of ozone-destroying chemicals.

In 1998, the GEF Council decided to expand beyond the initial three implementing agencies, including the International Finance Corporation, to broaden its ability to enable innovating financing mechanisms and better leverage private sector investment. The GEF subsequently was also selected to serve as financial mechanism for three more international conventions: The Stockholm Convention on Persistent Organic Pollutants (2001), the United Nations Convention to Combat Desertification (2003), and the Minamata Convention on Mercury (2013).

== Areas of work ==
The GEF work focuses on six main areas, including biodiversity, climate change (mitigation and adaptation), chemicals and waste, international waters, land degradation, and sustainable forest management.

Biodiversity: Biodiversity is under heavy threat. Reducing and preventing further biodiversity loss are considered among the most critical challenges to humankind. Of all the problems the world faces in managing “global goods,” only the loss of biodiversity is irreversible. The GEF supports projects that address the key drivers of biodiversity loss which focus on the highest leveraging opportunities to achieve sustainable biodiversity conservation.

Climate change: Climate change from human-induced emissions of heat-trapping greenhouse gases (GHGs) is a critical global issue, requiring substantial action. These actions include investment to reduce emissions of greenhouse gases, and adaptation to climate changes including variability. The early impacts of climate change have already appeared, and scientists believe that further impacts are inevitable. Many of the most serious and negative impacts of climate change will be disproportionately borne by the poorest people in developing countries. The GEF supports projects in developing countries.

- Climate change mitigation: Reducing or avoiding greenhouse gas emissions in the areas of renewable energy; energy efficiency; sustainable transport; and management of land use, land-use change, and forestry.
- Climate change adaptation: Aiming at developing countries to become climate-resilient by promoting immediate and longer-term adaptation measures in development policies, plans, programs, projects, and actions.

Chemicals: Persistent organic pollutants (POPs) are pesticides, industrial chemicals, or unwanted by-products of industrial processes that have been used for decades but have more recently been found to share a number of disturbing characteristics, including:

- Persistence – they resist degradation in air, water, and sediments;
- Bio-accumulation – they accumulate in living tissues at concentrations higher than those in the surrounding environment;
- Long-range transport – they can travel great distances from the source of release through air, water, and migratory animals, often contaminating areas thousands of kilometers away from any known source.

The GEF supports projects working to eliminate the production and use of specific POPs, taking measures to ensure that they are managed and disposed of in an environmentally sound manner, identifying the sources, and reducing releases of POPs byproducts.

Circular Economy: GEF has hosted events on the circular economy, which shifts from a take-make-waste economy to one that seeks to use no non-renewable source materials and produce zero waste. GEF is a member of the Platform for Accelerating the Circular Economy (PACE).

International waters: Diversions of water for irrigation, bulk supply, and potable use, together with the pollution of common water bodies are creating cross-border tensions. These tensions also persist across the oceans, with three-quarters of fish stocks being overfished, fished at their maximum, or in a depleted state. The GEF supports projects in helping countries work together to overcome these tensions in large water systems and to collectively manage their transboundary surface water basins, groundwater basins, and coastal and marine systems in order to share the benefits from them.

Land degradation: Land degradation is a major threat to biodiversity, ecosystem stability, and society's ability to function. Because of the interconnectivity between ecosystems across scales, land degradation triggers destructive processes that can have cascading effects across the entire biosphere. Loss of biomass through vegetation clearance and increased soil erosion produces greenhouse gases that contribute global warming and climate change. The GEF supports projects in reversing and preventing desertification/land degradation and in mitigating the effects of drought in affected areas in order to support poverty reduction and environmental sustainability.

Sustainable forest management / Reducing emissions from deforestation and forest degradation+: Forests cover almost one-third of the world's land area. They have a unique potential to produce multiple global environmental benefits such as biodiversity conservation, carbon sequestration, and protection against desertification. Sustainably managed forests can enhance the provision of wood and non-timber forest products for about 1.6 billion people depending on forests for their livelihoods. Forest ecosystems are also expected to play a key role in helping people in developing countries to adapt to the effects of climate change. The GEF supports projects in forest conservation (primarily protected areas and buffer zones), sustainable use of forests (forest production landscapes, sustainable forest management), and addressing forests and trees in the wider landscape.

In addition to these thematic areas, the GEF has works to support:

- Capacity development
- Debt-for-nature swaps
- Gender equality
- Indigenous Peoples and traditional knowledge
- Results and learning
- Small Island Developing States

== Small Grants Programme ==
The GEF runs a Small Grants Programme that provides financial and technical support to projects which embody a community-based approach. The GEF sees community based projects as the cornerstone for addressing local and global environmental and sustainable development challenges.

== See also ==
- Climate finance
- Green Climate Fund
- Climate Investment Funds
- Paris Agreement
