= Iddris =

Iddris can be both a masculine given name and a surname. Notable people with this name include:

- Iddris Sandu (born 1997), American entrepreneur and software engineer
- Mustapha Ali Iddris (1955–2013), Ghanaian politician
- Ibrahim Basha Iddris, Ghanaian Islamic preacher

== See also ==
- Idris (name)
- Idris (disambiguation)
