= Idris Omar =

Malaysian Islamic preacher and politician (1935–2024)

Member of the Pahang State Legislative Assembly
- In office 1999–2004
- Preceded by: Mohd Sarit Yusoh
- Succeeded by: constituency abolished
- Constituency: Semantan

Personal details
- Born: 18 October 1935 Temerloh, Pahang, Federated Malay States
- Died: 18 February 2024 (aged 88) Sepang District, Selangor, Malaysia
- Party: PAS
- Education: Al-Azhar University
- Occupation: Islamic preacher

Idris Omar (18 October 1935 – 18 February 2024) was a Malaysian Islamic preacher and politician. A member of the Malaysian Islamic Party, he served in the Pahang State Legislative Assembly from 1999 to 2004.

Idris died in Sepang District on 18 October 2024 at the age of 88.
