= Iddris Sandu =

American software engineer

- Born: May 7, 1997 (age 29); Accra, Ghana
- Occupations: Software engineer, Technology design architect

Iddris Sandu (born May 7, 1997) is an American and Ghanaian entrepreneur, programmer, and engineer. He is the CEO of Spatial Labs Inc., a hardware software infrastructure company.

== Early life ==
Sandu was born in Accra, Ghana. Sandu grew up in Compton, California, before later moving to Harbor City, California. He moved to the United States with his family at the age of 3 and learned computer programming at the age of ten. At the age of 13, he was offered an internship at Google where he worked on Google+ and designs for other social connectivities. In high school, he created an app for his school that provided turn by turn navigation for students to navigate around the campus using augmented reality. Sandu also advocated for STEM in the high school curriculum.

== Career ==
Sandu has worked as a technological design consultant and engineer with companies such as Boeing, Twitter, Lockheed Martin, Raytheon, Uber, Snapchat and Instagram. For Uber he created the software called Autonomous Collision Detection Interface, a software program that detects a driver's hand motion and position.

He has worked on digital content for Beyonce, Kanye West, Migos, Travis Scott, Rihanna, Jay Z, and Jaden Smith. In 2017, he partnered with Nipsey Hussle to open the Marathon clothing store in LA.

In 2021, Sandu founded Spatial Labs, a hardware software infrastructure company based in Los Angeles. In October 2021, Marcy Venture Partnership (MVP) founded by Jay-Z invested in Spatial Labs. In 2022, Spatial Labs launched Gen One Hardwear, a collection of garments embedded with LNQ’s proprietary LNQ One Chip, and LNQ Marketplace, a retail platform to trade physical goods on the blockchain.

== Awards ==
In 2022, Sandu was featured in the Ebony Power 100 list. In 2019, he won the Young African Committed to Excellence (YACE) Rising Star award and the Technology Award at the Culture Creators Innovators & Leaders Awards. He has also received a Certificate of Commendation from Barack Obama.
