= Idris Ibrahim Jamil =

Sudanese former Minister of Justice

- إدريس إبراهيم جميل

Minister of Ministry of Communications and Information Technology

Personal details
- Born: 1959 (age 66–67)
- Education: University of Khartoum; University of Leicester the American University

Idris Ibrahim Jamil is a Sudanese lawyer and a former minister of Justice of the Republic of Sudan.

== Early life and education ==
Jamil was born in 1959.

He obtained his first degree from the University of Khartoum in 1983; his master's degree from the University of Leicester, Britain in 1996; and his doctorate from commercial law from the American University in 2001.

== Career ==
Jamil served as the legal advisor to different organisations. In 2017, he was nominated as the Minister of Justice of the Federal Republic of Sudan.
