= Idris Khattak =

Missing human rights activist

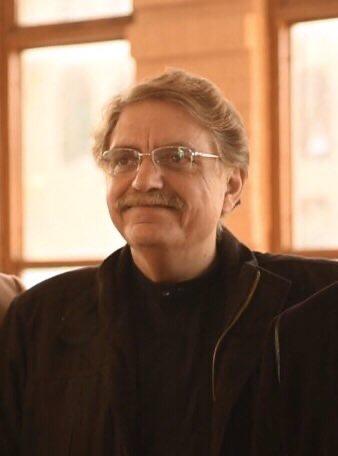
- Born: November 19, 1963 (age 62); Pakistan
- Disappeared: 13 November 2019; Khyber Pakhtunkhwa
- Status: Imprisoned after a conviction by military court
- Known for: Human rights work
- Children: 2

Idris Khattak is a Pakistani human rights activist. In early December 2021 a military court sentenced Khattak to 14 years in prison for espionage.

== Life ==
Idris Khattak was born in December 1963. He had previously worked for Amnesty International and Human Rights Watch on a wide range of topics including people illegally disappeared by the military. He holds a PhD in anthropology from Saint Petersburg.

Khattak has two daughters, Shumaisa and Talia.

=== Abduction ===
Khattak was abducted by four individuals on the Swabi motorway interchange in the province of Khyber Pakhtunkhwa on 13 November 2019.

An unnamed source testified to the UN OHCHR that he was kept in solitary confinement from November 2019 until his transfer to a district jail in November 2021. Khattak is also alleged to have been subjected to psychological and physical torture including being coerced into signing a false confession. The government of Pakistan has refused to respond to these allegations beyond the acknowledgement that Khattak is in their custody. In February 2021 Amnesty International reported the Peshawar High Court had denied Khattak's appeal to be tried in a civilian court and that his trial would instead take place in a military court. In 2026 a group of UN human rights experts testified that Khattak's health is deteriorating due to the conditions of his detention.

=== Conviction ===
He was sentenced to 14 years imprisonment in a secret military court trial in late-2021, not being allowed to defend his case. Human Rights Watch condemned the sentencing, saying that "Pakistan's security forces have with impunity long carried out enforced disappearances" and calling for him to tried publicly in a civilian court. Amnesty International called the sentencing "the culmination of a shameful two-year process that has been unjust from start to finish" and saying that "enforced disappearances must, once and for all, be put to an end."

== See also ==
- Mudassar Naaru
- List of kidnappings
- List of people who disappeared mysteriously: post-1990
