= Driss Seghir =

Moroccan short-story writer (born 1948)

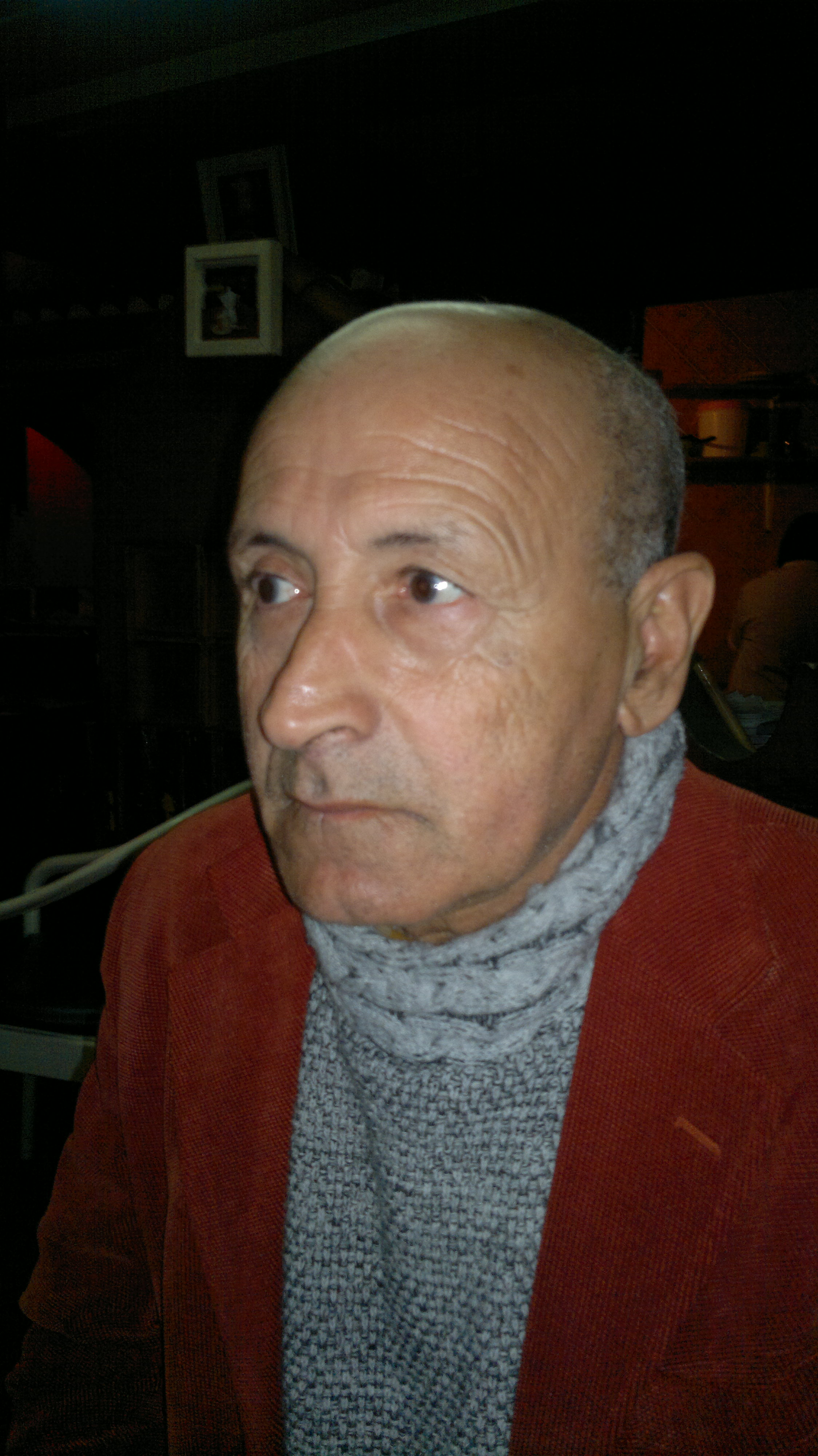
- Born: May 21, 1948; Kenitra
- Writing career
- Genre: short stories

Driss Seghir is a Moroccan short-story writer. He was born on May 21, 1948, in Kenitra, Morocco.

== Works ==
Author of :

- «Curse & The Blue Words» short stories 1976
- «Odious Time», novel 1983
- «Of Children & Homeland» short stories in 1985
- «Terrifying Faces in A Terrifying Street» short stories, 1985
- «Great River Concerto» novel in 1990
- «Dreams Of The Beautiful Butterflies» a play in 1995
- «Last-Chance Harbour» novel co-authored with Abdel Hamid El Gharbaoui in 1995
- «His Excellency The Minister» short stories in 1999

== Co-Author of ==
- «A Dialogue Between Two Generations» short stories co-authored with Mohamed Said Raihani
