= Idris Salman =

Nigerian politician

Member of the House of Representatives
- In office 2019–2023
- Constituency: Ijhmu/Kabba-Bunu constituency of Kogi State

Personal details
- Born: Kogi State, Nigeria
- Party: All Progressives Congress
- Occupation: Politician

Idris Salman is a Nigerian politician. He currently serves as the Federal Representative representing Ijhmu/Kabba-Bunu constituency of Kogi State in the 10th National Assembly.
