= Idrisi (surname) =

Idrisi (Arabic: ادريسي) is a family name in Middle East and South Asia. Idris is a masculine first name. Notable people with the name include:

- Muhammad al-Idrisi, a 12th-century explorer, geographer and writer
- Idris I of Libya, a 20th-century Libyan king

== See also ==
- Idris, a prophet of Islam, named Enoch in Judaism and Christianity
- Idrisid dynasty
- Idris
