= Gədik =

- Location within Azerbaijan
- Coordinates: 41°17′57″N 48°46′41″E
- Country: Azerbaijan
- Rayon: Quba
- Municipality: Gədikqışlaq

Population (2014)
  - Total: 0
- Time zone: UTC+4 (AZT)
  - Summer (DST): UTC+5 (AZT)

Gədik (also, Gedik and Gyadik) is a former village in the Quba Rayon of Azerbaijan. The village formed part of the municipality of Gədikqışlaq.
