= Idris Shaaba Jimada =

Nigerian professor and director

- Born: Idris Shaaba Jimada; 1984 (age 41–42); Kwara State, Nigeria
- Education: University of Ilorin Ahmadu Bello University
- Occupation: Academic
- Title: Director

Idris Shaaba Jimada is a Nigerian academic and the Director of Arewa House in Kaduna. He is a professor of history and the deputy dean of the Faculty of Arts at Ahmadu Bello University.

== Biography ==
Jimada hails from Kwara State. He earned an MA and PhD from Ahmadu Bello University. His research focuses on intergroup relations and contemporary and comparative national and international studies on political and social movements.

Jimada was appointed Director of Arewa House to replace Professor Sule Bello. Arewa House is the former state house of the northern Nigeria region and the residence of Premier Sir Ahmadu Bello. It is now the headquarters for historical research and documentations for Ahmadu Bello University.

== See also ==
- List of Hausa people
