= Idrissa Traoré =

Idrissa Traoré is the name of:

- Idrissa Traoré (footballer, born 1943), Burkinabé footballer and football manager
- Idrissa Traoré (footballer, born 1990), Malian footballer
- Idrissa Traoré (footballer, born 1991), Malian footballer
- Idrissa Traoré (referee), Malian football referee

== See also ==
- Drissa Traoré (born 1992), Ivorian footballer
