= Driss Moussaoui =

Moroccan psychiatrist

Driss Moussaoui is a Moroccan professor of psychiatry and one of the first psychiatrists in Morocco. He is the founder of the Department of Psychiatry at the Faculty of Medicine and Pharmacy Casablanca and of the university psychiatric center of Casablanca, part of the University Hospital Ibn Rochd and former president of the World Association of Social Psychiatry.

He is the author and co-author of numerous books, including on subjects such as the psychiatry in its relation to religion, and migration.
