= Youcef Dris =

Algerian writer and journalist

- Born: 15 October 1945 (age 80); Tizi Ouzou, French Algeria
- Occupation: Journalist
- Writing career
- Language: French
- Genre: Poetry

Youcef Dris (born 15 October 1945, in Tizi Ouzou) is an Algerian writer and journalist.

He started as a journalist in 1970 writing publications for El Moujahid. Afterwards, he became Editor in chief of the press group West Oran Tribune. He directed two cultural weeklies. The author recently published, in 2013, a new historical essay titled "Le Combat des justes" (The battle of the just), published by El Ibriz in Algiers. The essay is an homage to the French who participated in the war of Algeria in the ranks of the National Liberation Front.

== Works ==
=== Essay ===
- Les Massacres d'octobre 1961 (2009)
- Le Combat des Justes (2013)

=== Novels ===
- Les Amants de Padovani (2004)
- Affaires criminelles. Histoires Vraies ( 2006)
- Biographie de Guerouabi (2008)
- Destin à l'encre noire (2012)
- "Le puits confisqué" (2010)

=== Poetry ===
- Grisaille (1993)
- Gravelures (2009)
