= İdris Ağalarov =

Azerbaijani opera singer (1917–1975)

- Born: October 20, 1917; Tbilisi, Tiflis uezd
- Died: May 4, 1975 (aged 57); Baku, Azerbaijan SSR, USSR
- Occupation: Singer

İdris Fərhad oğlu Ağalarov (October 20, 1917 – May 4, 1975) was an Azerbaijani opera singer, People's Artiste of the Azerbaijan SSR (1958).

== Biography ==
İdris Ağalarov was born on October 20, 1917, in Tbilisi. In 1939, he graduated from the Baku Music College. Since 1937, he had been a soloist of the Azerbaijan State Academic Opera and Ballet Theater. He graduated from the conservatory in 1943.

Ağalarov died on May 4, 1975, in Baku.

== Awards ==
- Honored Artist of the Azerbaijan SSR — June 17, 1943
- People's Artiste of the Azerbaijan SSR — April 26, 1958
