= Driss El Khouri =

Moroccan writer (1939–2022)

- Born: 1939; Casablanca, Morocco
- Died: 14 February 2022 (aged 83); Salé, Morocco
- Occupation(s): Journalist, novelist

Driss El Khouri (1939 – 14 February 2022) was a Moroccan novelist who was one of the most acclaimed in the country. El Khouri died at his home in Salé on 14 February 2022, at the age of 83.

== Novels ==
- Al-Bidayat (Beginnings) (1980),
- Al-’ayyam wa Allayali (Days and Nights) (1982)
- Madinat Atturab (City of Dirt) (1988).

== External links (both in French) ==
- Hommage to Driss el Khouri at the festival in Rabat (2004)
- Hommage to Driss el Khouri by the Institut du monde Arabe in Paris

== Bibliography ==
- Le Monde, 2 October 2003: Driss El Khoury fait bonne figure en Italie (Festival de la littérature méditerraéenne)
