= Mohamed Thameur Chaibi =

Tunisian professor of Rural Engineering

Professor Mohamed Thameur Chaibi FAAS FTWAS FIAS
- Education: National Institute of Agronomy; Netherlands International Institute for Management
- Scientific career
- Fields: Water resources engineering Solar thermal processes Climate technologies
- Institutions: National Research Institute for Agricultural Engineering

Mohamed Thameur Chaibi is a Tunisian professor of Rural Engineering at the National Research Institute for Agricultural Engineering.

== Early life and education ==
Chaibi obtained his Engineering diploma in Rural Development with honours from the High School of Rural Equipment in Tunisia in 1984, before specialising in Hydraulic and Rural Engineering at the National Agronomic Institute of Tunisia in 1987. In 1992, he obtained a postgraduate diploma from the Netherlands International Institute for Management. Then he received a Master of Science degree in Agriculture Bio-systems and technologies from the Swedish University of Agricultural Sciences in 1997. Chaibi completed his Doctor of Philosophy in Agriculture and Climate Technologies at the same university in 2003, before returning to Tunisia in 2005, and hablitate in Environmental Sciences at the Institution for Agricultural Research and High Education.

== Career and research ==
Chaibi was the Head of the Department of Rural Engineering at the National Research Institute for Agricultural Engineering, Water and Forestry (INRGREF). He was a GIZ Senior advisor for the Pan African University Institute of Water and Energy Sciences, and a senior expert in S&T at the African Union Commission. He is currently a professor and a director of research at the INRGREF and a member of the editorial board of Resources and Environment. Chaibi served in various capacities as an associate member of the Environmental Security panel under the NATO Science for Peace and Security and the European Commission Frameworks Programs.

Chaibi research focuses on solar thermal processes, solar desalination, energy systems analysis, climate technologies, and water resources engineering.

== Awards and honours ==
Chaibi was elected a Fellow of the African Academy of Sciences (FAAS) in 2006, a Fellow of The World Academy of Sciences (FTWAS) in 2009, and a Fellow of the Islamic World Academy of Sciences (FIAS) in 2016. He was a member of the Governing Council of the African Academy of Sciences (North Africa Region) in 2010.

== Selected publications ==
- Bourouni, K.; Chaibi, M. T.; Tadrist, L. (2001-05-01). Water desalination by humidification and dehumidification of air: State of the art. Desalination. 137 (1): 167–176. doi:10.1016/S0011-9164(01)00215-6. ISSN 0011-9164.
- Chaibi, M. T. (2000-02-01). An overview of solar desalination for domestic and agriculture water needs in remote arid areas. Desalination. 127 (2): 119–133. doi:10.1016/S0011-9164(99)00197-6. ISSN 0011-9164.
- Bourouni, K.; Martin, R.; Tadrist, L.; Chaibi, M. T. (1999-09-01). Heat transfer and evaporation in geothermal desalination units. Applied Energy. 64 (1): 129–147. doi:10.1016/S0306-2619(99)00071-9. ISSN 0306-2619.
- Chaibi, M. T. (2000-04-15). Analysis by simulation of a solar still integrated in a greenhouse roof. Desalination. 128 (2): 123–138. doi:10.1016/S0011-9164(00)00028-X. ISSN 0011-9164.
- Chaibi, M. T.; Jilar, T. (2004-01-01). System design, operation and performance of roof-integrated desalination in greenhouses. Solar Energy. 76 (5): 545–561. doi:10.1016/j.solener.2003.12.008. ISSN 0038-092X.
