= Driss Sekkat =

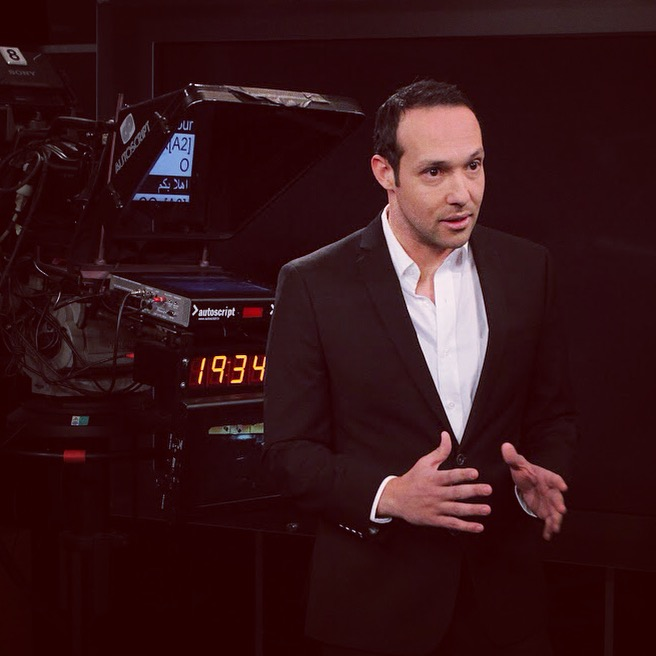
- Born: 17 June 1985 (age 41); Casablanca
- Citizenship: Moroccan American
- Education: Ohio Wesleyan University
- Occupation: Executive Producer
- Known for: News, production, journalism

Driss Sekkat is Moroccan American television producer.

== Education and early career ==
Sekkat earned a Bachelor of Arts degree in Journalism from Ohio Wesleyan University and was presented with the 2016 Ohio Wesleyan University Young Alumni Award.

Sekkat began his career at ESPN and CNN prior to documentary work around the world.

Sekkat created four seasons of the investigative documentary Street Pulse. The flagship series won the 2015 Bronze Award at the New York Film Festival for its series on Cemetery Residents and was awarded the 2014 CINE Special Jury Award and the 2013 CINE Golden Eagle Award for its exclusive one hour documentary on El Minya quarry labor workers. The hit show was nominated in 2013 by the AIB International Media Excellence Awards for best documentary series.

In 2014 – 2015, Sekkat created and produced 2 seasons of Our Neighborhood – an 8 part docu-series on life inside Cairo's neighborhoods.

In 2016, Sekkat was executive producer and creator of a 3 part hard-hitting documentary series on violent extremism entitled Invisible Enemy, filmed in Morocco.

Sekkat founded All Access Media in 2016, a production company specialized in the launch of original programming across TV, OTT, digital, and social platforms.

== Television broadcasting ==
In 2024, Sekkat was executive producer of Taco Bell's live broadcast "Live Mas Live event". The 60-minute event featured Taco Bell CEO Sean Tresvant, CMO Taylor Montgomery, and celebrity artist Armani White. The show was nominated for 2024 best event activation by the Webby Awards

Sekkat served as the executive producer of the event presented by Bud Light called "World's Largest Tailgate". YouTube stars "the Merrell Twins" hosted the 90-minute format and celebrated the Super Bowl defending champion Kansas City Chiefs. The show was nominated for "The PGA Innovation Award" for the 35th Annual Producers Guild Awards.

In 2023, Sekkat led the launch and rebranding of a 24/7 financial news OTT network Charles Schwab Network broadcasting from its studios in Chicago and the New York Stock Exchange.

Sekkat recently rebranded and re-launched The Hill TV's flagship show "Rising," hosted by Robby Soave and Briahna Joy Gray.

In 2018, Sekkat helped create and launch the first financial Over-The-Top (OTT) network of its kind, TD Ameritrade Network. As executive producer, Sekkat led the network's launch of 8 hours of original programming.

His most notable experience includes his special coverage of President Obama's visit to Cairo in 2009 and the 2012 U.S. elections.
