= Idris Richards =

- Full name: Evan Idris Richards
- Born: 18 November 1892 Treforest, Wales
- Died: 20 November 1962 (aged 70) Sully, Wales
- Occupation: Banker

Rugby union career
- Position: Forward
International career
Years	Team	Apps	(Points)
1925	Wales	3	(0)

Evan Idris Richards (18 November 1892 – 20 November 1962) was a Welsh international rugby union player.

== Biography ==
Born in Treforest, near Pontypridd, Richards was a heavily built forward and played for Cardiff. He gained three international caps as a member of the Wales team during the 1925 Five Nations.

Richards was employed as a banker.

== See also ==
- List of Wales national rugby union players
