= Rachid Driss =

Tunisian politician, diplomat and writer (1917–2009)

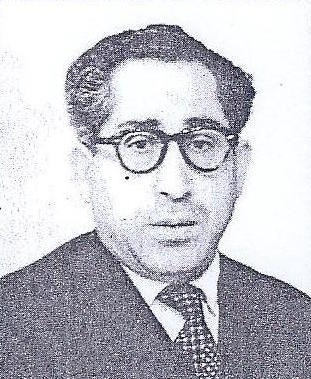
Rachid Driss

Rachid Driss (Arabic: الرشيد إدريس) (January 27, 1917 – September 5, 2009) was a Tunisian diplomat and writer. He held the position of the Ambassador of Tunisia to the United States, and was President of the United Nations' Social and Economic Council in 1971.

He was born in Tunis and died in Carthage, Tunisia.
