= İdrisqışlaq =

- Location within Azerbaijan
- Coordinates: 41°16′40″N 48°45′47″E
- Country: Azerbaijan
- Rayon: Quba
- Municipality: Gədikqışlaq
- Time zone: UTC+4 (AZT)
  - Summer (DST): UTC+5 (AZT)

İdrisqışlaq (also, İdrisiqışlaq and Idrisi) is a village in the Quba Rayon of Azerbaijan. The village forms part of the municipality of Gədikqışlaq.
