= Driss Dallahi =

American cheerleader

- Education: University of New Hampshire
- Occupations: Cheerleader; Dancer
- Career
- Former groups: New England Patriots Cheerleaders

Driss Dallahi is an American cheerleader who in 2019 became one of the first two male cheerleaders for the New England Patriots in more than 30 years.

== Early life and education ==
Dallahi grew up in Londonderry, New Hampshire. He went to Londonderry High School and then attended the University of New Hampshire, majoring in dance with minors in business administration and kinesiology.

== Cheerleading career ==
Dallahi started cheerleading around 2018 in New York City. He specializes in aerials. In 2019, he became one of the first two male cheerleaders for the New England Patriots in more than 30 years, alongside Steven Sonntag; they were among 34 members selected from a pool of 300 applicants.

== Personal life ==
Dallahi is openly gay. Outside of his cheerleading, he works as an HR operations generalist.

== See also ==
- Parker West
