= Driss Bensari =

Moroccan professor of Geophysics

Professor Driss Ben-Sari FAAS FTWAS
- إدريس بن صاري
- Born: 1942 (age 83–84); Taza, Morocco
- Education: National Institute of Geography, France; French Institute of Petroleum; University of Grenoble
- Awards: Scientific Grand Prize of Morocco
- Scientific career
- Fields: Geophysics; Astronomy; Earthquakes
- Institutions: Mohammed V University

Driss Ben-Sari FAAS FTWAS (Arabic: إدريس بن صاري, born 1942) is a Moroccan professor of Geophysics at the Department of Civil Engineering, Mohammed V University in Rabat.

== Life and career ==
Ben-Sari was born in Taza, Morocco in 1942. He obtained his first degree in Geographical Sciences from National Institute of Geography, France in 1965. He received his master's degree in Applied Geophysics from the French Institute of Petroleum, before completing a Doctor of Philosophy degree in Physical Sciences at the University of Grenoble in 1977.

Ben-Sari then returned to Morocco, and he has been a professor of Geophysics at the Department of Civil Engineering, Mohammadia School of Engineering, Mohammed V University, Rabat, since 1978.

Ben-Sari served as Coordinator of the International Centre of Sciences and High Technology, and a Director of the Moroccan Institute of Astronomy, the National alert network for earthquakes, and the National Centre for Research and Planning of Science. He is member of the Society for Technical Communication, International Council for Science, and Independent World Commission on the Ocean.

Ben-Sari published his memoirs: Vivid memories (French: Mémoires Vives), testimonies and experiences of a lifetime.

== Awards and honours ==
Ben-Sari was elected a Fellow of the African Academy of Sciences (FAAS) in 1987, and Fellow of the World Academy of Sciences (FTWAS) in 1988. Ben-Sari received the Scientific Grand Prize of Morocco.
