= Idriss =

Idriss may refer to:

- Idriss Arnaoud Ali (1945–2015), President of the National Assembly of Djibouti
- Idriss Carlos Kameni (born 1984), Cameroonian football player
- Idriss Déby (1952–2021), President of Chad
- Idriss Hassan, Sudanese military officer
- Idriss Ndele Moussa (1959–2013), Chadian politician
- Idriss Ngari (1946–2025), Gabonese politician
- Mahamat Idriss (1942–1987), Chadian high jumper
- Idriss (terrorist), alleged Canadian militant with ties to al-Qaeda
- Izzat M. Idriss (born 1935), Syrian-American geotechnical engineer
- Ramey Idriss (1911–1971), American musician and songwriter

== See also ==
- Iddris
- Idris (disambiguation)
