= Driss el-Yazami =

Moroccan human rights activist

Driss El Yazami
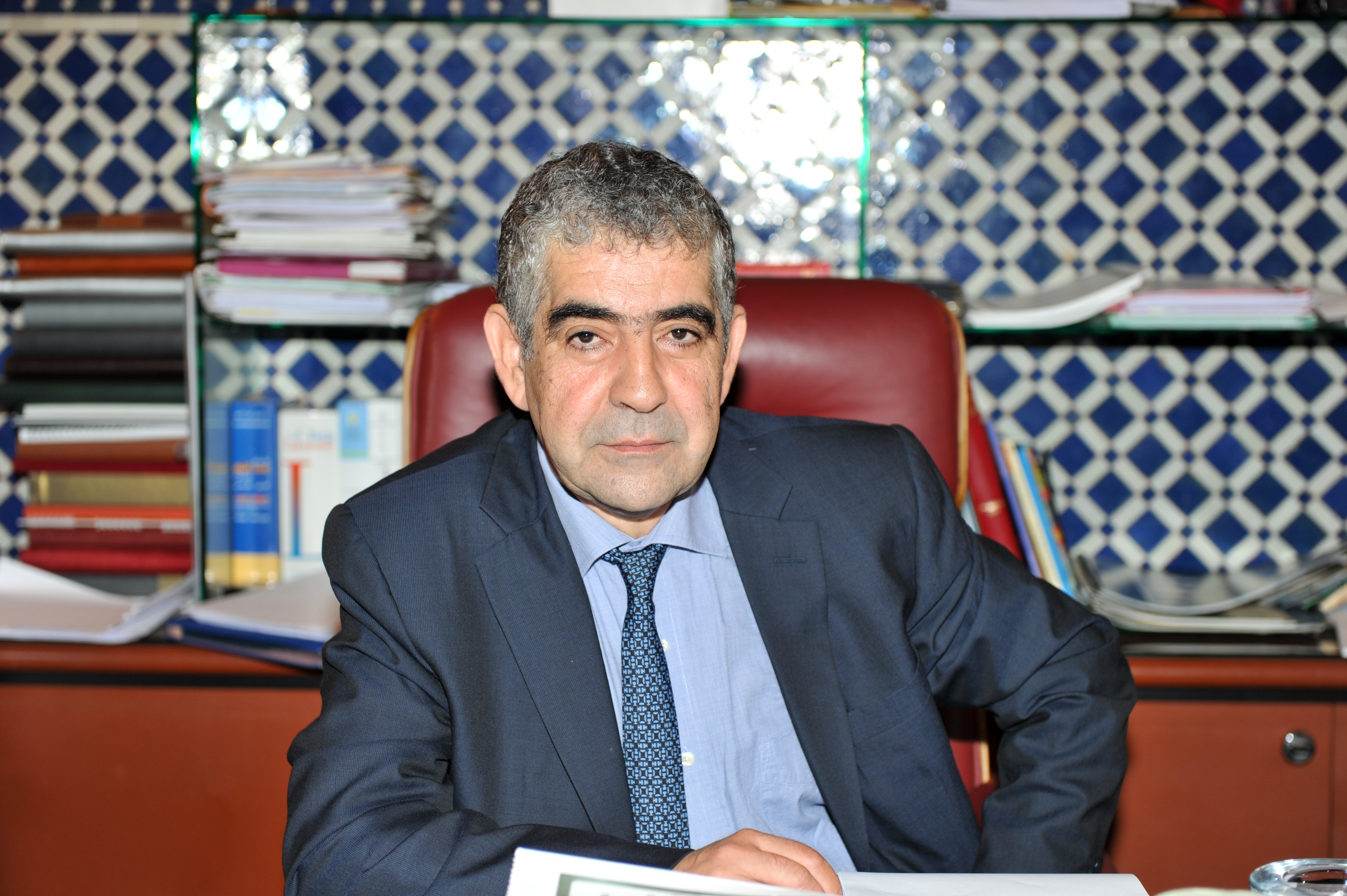
- Driss el-Yazami in 2011
- Born: 1 January 1952 (age 74); Fez, Morocco
- Occupation: Lawyer

Driss el-Yazami (Arabic: إدريس اليزمي; born 1952 in Fez, Morocco) is a Moroccan human rights activist. He was President of the National Council of Human Rights (CNDH) in Morocco between March 2011 and December 2018.

== Career and activism ==
In the mid-1970s, the young el-Yazami spent three months in the prisons of Hassan II, having been expelled from France after leading a radical left strike. His younger brother was imprisoned in Kenitra.

He has held senior positions in several institutions and bodies in Morocco as well as international associations and organizations.

El-Yazami was formerly a member of the Equity and Reconciliation Commission of the Advisory Council on Human Rights and member of the Board of Directors of the Three Cultures Foundation (Spain).

== Honours ==
Decorated by King Mohammed VI of Wissam Al Moukafaa Al Wataniya of the Order of Grand Officer and Wissam Al Arch of the Order of Commander. Driss El Yazami is an Officer of the Legion of Honor of the French Republic, under foreign personalities, and Officer of the Order of Leopold, he highest division of Belgium.
