= Idris Ahmed Mia =

- ইদ্রীস আহমদ মিঞা

Member of the East Bengal Legislative Assembly
- In office 1954–1954
- Constituency: Rajshahi

Member of the Bengal Legislative Assembly
- In office 1937–1946
- Succeeded by: Zahur Ahmed Choudhury
- Constituency: Malda South

Personal details
- Born: 13 September 1894 Dadanchowk, Shibganj Upazila, Malda district, Bengal Presidency
- Died: October 9, 1966 (aged 72) East Pakistan
- Party: Krishak Sramik Party

Idris Ahmed Mia (Bengali: ইদ্রিস আহমদ মিঞা; 13 September 1894 – 9 October 1966) was a politician. He was a member of the Bengal Legislative Assembly.

== Early life and education ==
Mia was born on 13 September 1894 to an upper middle class Bengali family of Muslim Mias in the village of Dadanchowk in Shibganj, then part of the Malda district of the Bengal Presidency (now Chapai Nawabganj, Bangladesh). His father, Haji Nahar Uddin, was known to have been highly educated and pious. He passed his entrance examinations in 1913 from the Nimtita High School in Murshidabad and his F.A. in 1915 from Rajshahi College. Mia then pursued a Bachelor of Arts degree from the same college, graduating first class with distinction in 1917.

== Career ==
Mia had close relations with Sher-e-Bangla A. K. Fazlul Huq. He was a member of the Krishak Praja Party's central committee and one of its regional leaders. In 1928, Mia was elected as the President of the Durlavpur Union Board. After that, he was elected as the Vice-Chairman of the Malda District Board. At the 1937 Bengal election, Mia was elected to the South Malda constituency at the Bengal Legislative Assembly, defeating his rival, an influential All-India Muslim League candidate.

After the Partition of Bengal in 1947, Mia was elected as a member of the Rajshahi District Board. He was successful at the 1954 East Bengal election as a United Front candidate, winning a seat at the East Bengal Legislative Assembly.

Whilst in eight grade, Mia founded a school on his own initiative. In his entire life, he established eight educational institutions. In 1956, as a political adviser to the provincial chief minister, he played an important role in acquiring land on behalf of the Government of Pakistan along with the District Magistrate for the establishment of the University of Rajshahi. Later, he was elected as the senior most Senate member of the University of Rajshahi twice.

In addition to social service and politics, he has written several research-based books in his life, some of which are among his published works:

- Potito Islam
- Moslem Obhab
- Bongo Desher Shongkkhipto Itihash
- Krishoker Mormobani
- Lakkha Abad
- Manush Na Methor
- Zoba (novel)
- Lal Golap (novel)
- Tin Talaqe Bipotti (novel)

He was also known to have translated the Amm-para of the Qur'an.

== Death ==
Mia died on 9 October 1966.
