= Idris Haider =

Bangladeshi television and film director (born 1964)

- ইদ্রিস হায়দার
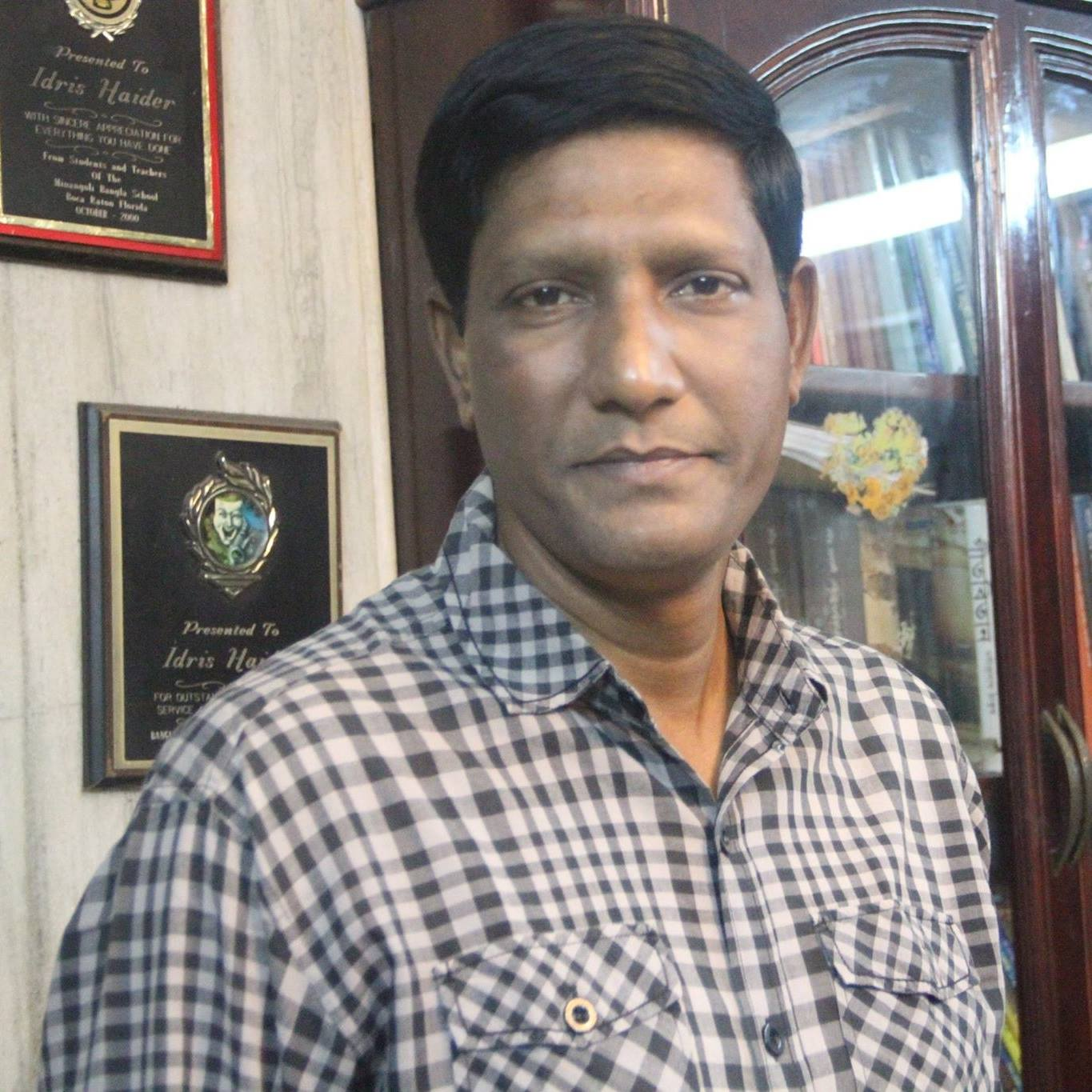
- Born: 19 November 1964 (age 61); Nawabganj Upazila, Dhaka, Bangladesh
- Occupations: Film director, film producer, screenwriter, actor
- Years active: 1989–present
- Organization: Wow Play TV

Idris Haider is a Bangladeshi film director, producer, screenwriter, and actor. From his early career in Television industry he is famous for making Drama Series."Syed Barir Bou" was the first and most popular drama serial which was aired on ATN Bangla. Bangladeshi Actress Pori Moni made her first debut on "Second Innings" Drama Serial which was Directed by Idris Haider. He is the chairman of record label company Wow Play TV. His recent film "Nil Foring" is awaited to be released on 2021 which is delayed due to COVID-19 pandemic. As he announced in media he is going to make another film "Amar Shonar Bangla, Ami Tomay Valobashi."

== Early career ==
Idris Haider was born on 19 November 1964 in an aristocratic family in Nawabganj, Dhaka. His father's name is Yunus Haider and mother's name is Jamila Khatun. He became interested in literature by writing poetry from an early age. After independence, in 1972, at the age of 9, he started acting on stage as a child artist. From school life he developed as a talented cultured person. In the 80's, while studying in the eighth grade, he became known as a drama director through "Spain Bijoyee Musa". He also gained a reputation for singing practice, scout troupe leaders and sports. In the eighties, Atish Dipankar was the president of Nawabganj Theater. During his tenure, famous playwrights Selim Al Deen, Salam Saqlain and his own story have exhibited about three hundred and fifty stage plays. He made his film debut in 1975 as an actor and assistant director. During this time he worked as a chief assistant to many talented directors including dubbing. In the 1990s, he moved to the United States to practice drama in theaters. There conducted more than a hundred-stage plays in association with the South Florida Association to preserve the heritage of Bengali culture while practicing.

=== Films ===
- Nil Foring Awaited to be released – Starring: Shipan Mitra, Affri Selina, Champa (actress), Shahidul Alam Sachchu, Kochi Khandakar, Kazi Ujjal, Arman Parvez Murad, Monira Mithu, Nima Rahman, Faruk Ahmed, Mukit zakaria, Saif Chandan.
- Kabliwala Available on Bongo BD

=== Television drama series ===
- Syed Barir Bou On aired ATN Bangla – (Starring: Ahmed Rubel, Parveen Sultana Diti, Chitralekha Guho, Tushar Khan, Tamalika Karmakar, Litu Anam, Bonna Mirza, Afroza Banu, Pijush Bandyopadhyay, Anisur Rahman Milon, Rahmat Ali, Pran Roy, Sharmin Shila, Wahida Mollick Jolly, Naznin Hasan Chumki, Fazlur Rahman Babu, Sohel Dhan, Momena Chowdhury, Ayesha Salma Mukti.)
- Mia Bari On aired Channel 1 (Bangladesh) – (Starring: Faruk Ahmed, Enamul Haque, Ejajul Islam, Nasima Khan, Sharmili Ahmed, Zakia Bari Mamo, Afzal Sharif, Hosne Ara Putul, Shirin Bokul, Saleh Ahmed, Shamima Nazneen, Sharmin Shila.)
- Nire Nirbashon On aired Bangladesh Television – (Starring: Faruk Ahmed, Dilara Zaman, Nasima Khan, Sharmili Ahmed, Zakia Bari Mamo, Ahmed Rubel, Fazlur Rahman Babu, Shahriar Nazim Joy, Deepa Khandakar, Sirajul Islam, Bulbul Ahmed, Oindrila Ahmed, Chitralekha Guho, Shirin Bokul, KS Firoz, Naznin Hasan Chumki, Enamul Haque).
- Amader Shangshar On aired ATN Bangla – (Starring: Hasan Masood, Parveen Sultana Diti, Chitralekha Guho, Tushar Khan, Arefin Shuvo, Mishu Sabbir, Afroza Banu, Pijush Bandyopadhyay, Raisul Islam Asad, Rahmat Ali, Pran Roy, Elora GohorNaznin Hasan Chumki, Rokeya Prachy, Lutfur Rahman George, Faruk Ahmed, Monira Mithu, Mousumi Nag, Pran Roy, Siddiqur Rahman, Sharmin Jahan Shoshi, Nafiza Jahan.
- Rupnogorer Koinna On aired Banglavision – (Starring: Arifin Shuvoo, Mishu Sabbir, Afsana Ara Bindu, Ahmed Rubel)
- Vomradoho College On aired Ekushey Television – (Starring: Arifin Shuvoo, Mishu Sabbir, Afsana Ara Bindu, Ahmed Rubel, Tazin Ahmed, Pijush Bandyopadhyay, Raisul Islam Asad, Monira Mithu)
- Chondro Bindu On aired Banglavision – (Starring: Shajal Noor, Afsana Ara Bindu, Mishu Sabbir, Agun)
- Hirok Bari Shonar Churi On aired Channel 1 (Bangladesh)
- Syed Barir Koinna
- Second Innings On aired Asian TV
- palonko On aired Asian TV
- Ranga Ma On aired Diganta Television
- MuniaTelevision On aired Bangladesh Television
- Ali Pappa Chor Chor On aired Asian TV and CD Choice
- Tara Vondo Released
- Ural Ponkhi On Maasranga Television

=== Television films ===
- Crisis
- Biyer Por Bouer Dosh
- My Valentine On aired Channel 1 (Bangladesh) and Zee TV
- Jomoj Jamai On aired Maasranga Television
- Khato Jamai Released on Wow Play TV & Red Films Entertainment
- Khato Jamai 2 Released on Wow Play TV & Red Films Entertainment
- O MA
- Abong Humayra Begum On aired Banglavision
- Thakur Da On aired Bangladesh Television
- Chondro Bindu On aired Eukshey TV
- Shopner Sohor
- Projonmo 71
- Golap Kotha On aired Banglavision
- Hyper World Cup – Cast : Hasan Masud, Arifin Shuvoo, Eshan Haider
- Jamaiyer Theke Bou Boro
- Omanush
- 5 Takar Burger
- 13 Bochorer Bou
- Ratkana Bou
- Eid Mubarak Maa
- Goriber Qurbani Eid
- Jamai Brazil Bou Argentina
- Ghaura Jamai
- Voot Bou
- Eid Mubarak Baba Ma
- Shoshur Barir Chahida
- Shikkhito Bekar
- School Paliye Biye
- Bura Boyoshe Biye
- Smart Rikshawali
- Valo Bou Mondo Bou
- Alem Jamai
- Takar Ovab (Crisis 3)
- Boka Dakat
- Shikkhito Kajer Meye
- Pakna Bou
- Bouer Dosh
- Robot Bou
