= Idris Zubairu =

Anglican bishop in Nigeria

Idris Zubairu is an Anglican bishop in Nigeria. He is the current Bishop of Sokoto, one of ten dioceses within the Anglican Province of Kaduna, itself one of 14 ecclesiastical provinces within the Church of Nigeria.

The bishop's wife Saratu Zubairu was kidnapped in March 2020 and released a week later.
