= United Nations Security Council Resolution 1372 =

UN Security Council Resolution 1372
- Sudan
- Date: 28 September 2001
- Meeting no.: 4,384
- Code: S/RES/1372 (Document)
- Subject: On Resolution 1054 (1996)
- Voting summary: 14 voted for; None voted against; 1 abstained
- Result: Adopted

Security Council composition
- Permanent members: China; France; Russia; United Kingdom; United States
- Non-permanent members: Bangladesh; Colombia; Ireland; Jamaica; Mali; Mauritius; Norway; Singapore; Tunisia; Ukraine

United Nations Security Council resolution 1372, adopted on 28 September 2001, after recalling resolutions 1044 (1996), 1054 (1996) and 1070 (1996) concerning the assassination attempt on Egyptian President Hosni Mubarak at an Organisation of African Unity (OAU) summit in the Ethiopian capital Addis Ababa on 26 June 1995 and subsequent measures, the Council noted compliance by Sudan and terminated sanctions against the country.

The Security Council noted steps taken by the Sudanese government to comply with previous Security Council resolutions, and that the Foreign Ministers of Egypt and Ethiopia supported the lifting of sanctions against Sudan. It welcomed Sudan's accession to international conventions for the elimination of terrorism such as the 1997 International Convention for the Suppression of Terrorist Bombings and 1999 International Convention for the Suppression of the Financing of Terrorism.

Acting under Chapter VII of the United Nations Charter, the Council lifted sanctions imposed in previous Security Council resolutions against Sudan. The sanctions were largely symbolic and few countries complied in their implementation. The resolution was adopted by 14 votes to none against, and one abstention from the United States. While the United States' representative approved of Sudan's compliance, it stated that suspects in the assassination attempt had not been turned over to the appropriate authorities.

== See also ==
- Foreign relations of Egypt
- Foreign relations of Ethiopia
- Foreign relations of Sudan
- List of United Nations Security Council Resolutions 1301 to 1400 (2000–2002)
