= United Nations Security Council Resolution 1070 =

UN Security Council Resolution 1070
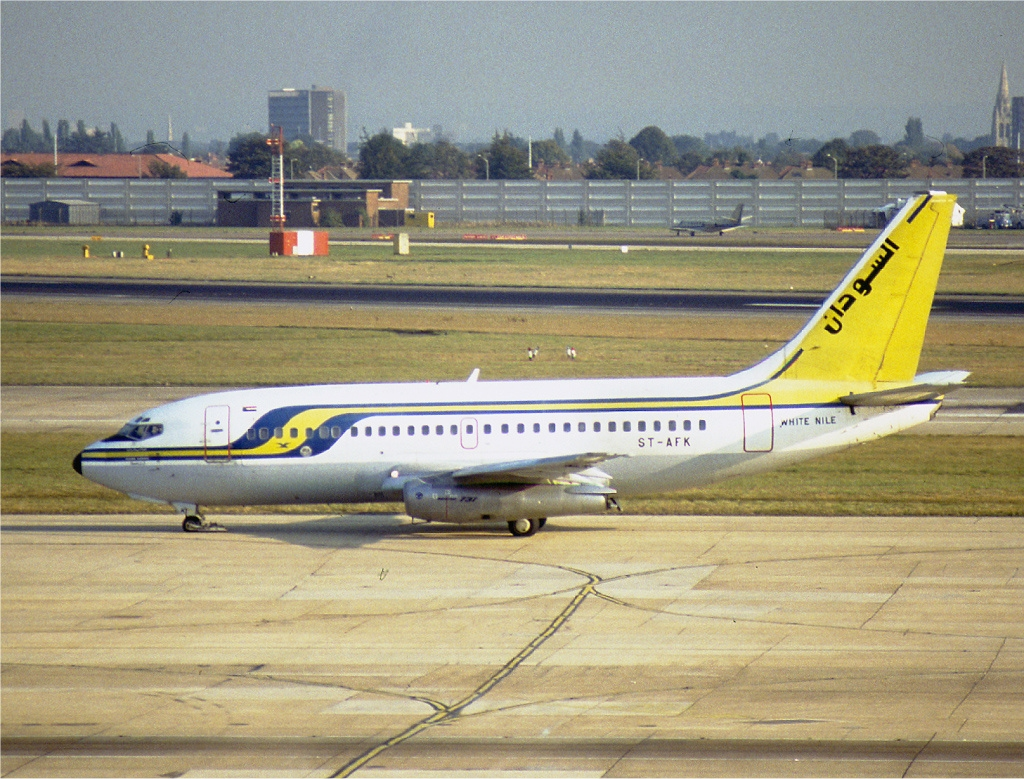
- Sudan Airways Boeing 737-200 (1989)
- Date: 16 August 1996
- Meeting no.: 3,690
- Code: S/RES/1070 (Document)
- Subject: Letter from Ethiopia to President of Security Council concerning Sudan
- Voting summary: 13 voted for; None voted against; 2 abstained
- Result: Adopted

Security Council composition
- Permanent members: China; France; Russia; United Kingdom; United States
- Non-permanent members: Botswana; Chile; Egypt; Guinea-Bissau; Germany; Honduras; Indonesia; Italy; South Korea; Poland

United Nations Security Council resolution 1070, adopted on 16 August 1996, after reaffirming resolutions 1044 (1996) and 1054 (1996) concerning the assassination attempt on Egyptian President Hosni Mubarak at an Organisation of African Unity (OAU) summit in the Ethiopian capital Addis Ababa on 26 June 1995 and subsequent sanctions, the Council placed aviation sanctions on the Government of Sudan after its failure to comply with OAU requests to extradite suspects sheltered in the country to Ethiopia.

The Security Council was alarmed by the assassination attempt on President Mubarak and stated that those responsible should be tried. According to the Organisation of African Unity (OAU), it was an attack against the stability of the entire African continent. It also noted that Sudan had not complied with requests from the OAU the question of the OAE to extradite suspects to Ethiopia. The Council was determined to eliminate international terrorism.

Acting under Chapter VII of the United Nations Charter, the Security Council again demanded that Sudan comply with the OAU request. Measures taken by several states to enforce the provisions of previous resolutions were noted and others that had yet to respond were urged to inform the Secretary-General Boutros Boutros-Ghali of measures they had taken as soon as possible.

It was then decided that all countries should prohibit planes from Sudan or operated by Sudan Airways take off, land or to overfly their territory. The sanctions would not take effect until at least ninety days after the adoption of the current resolution. By 15 November 1996, the Secretary-General was asked to report on whether Sudan had complied with the OAU request.

Resolution 1070 was adopted by 13 votes to none against, with two abstentions from China and Russia.

== See also ==
- Foreign relations of Egypt
- Foreign relations of Ethiopia
- Foreign relations of Sudan
- List of United Nations Security Council Resolutions 1001 to 1100 (1995–1997)
- United Nations Security Council Resolution 1372 (2001) – lifted all sanctions against Sudan
