= Malaysia–Sudan relations =

- Malaysia: Sudan

Malaysia–Sudan relations refers to the bilateral relations between Malaysia and Sudan. Malaysia has an embassy in Khartoum, and Sudan has an embassy in Kuala Lumpur. Both countries are members of the Organisation of Islamic Cooperation.

== History ==
The two countries established their relations in 1973. Economic relations between the two began in 1991 when Sudan opened its embassy in Malaysia's capital, before Malaysia opened their embassy in Sudan's capital in August 1999. On 13 May 1998, Malaysian Prime Minister Mahathir Mohamad arrived Sudan for a three-day official visit.

Malaysia is one of the earliest countries to invest in Sudan through Petronas in 1995, with an oilfield in North and South Sudan based on headquarters in Khartoum and around 300 Malaysians living in Sudan, being Petronas officials and their families. As of the early 2000s, Malaysia was the second-largest shareholder in Sudan’s oil industry after China. Its state-owned oil company, PETRONAS, had a 30-percent share of Sudan’s Greater Nile Petroleum Operating Company. Oil remained Malaysia’s primary interest in Sudan, although during an April 2007 visit to Sudan, Malaysia’s prime minister expressed a willingness to expand bilateral relations beyond oil and gas. He also supported Sudan’s policy in Darfur. Malaysia assisted with the resettlement of Darfur refugees and provided scholarships for Sudanese students to study oil and gas at Universiti Teknologi Petronas. Malaysia had fewer than 10 personnel assigned to UNMIS and more than 60 with UNAMID.

In 2011, some 13,000 Sudanese have visited Malaysia as one of their tourism and honeymoon destinations. Along the same year, Sudan grants a one-month visa for Malaysians and beyond that, Malaysians can apply to extend that period. In 2012, the trade between the two countries estimated at US$90 million. Malaysian major exports to Sudan are palm oil, metal products and machinery, while Sudanese exports are mostly agricultural products such as gum arabic, hibiscus and black seeds, as well as petroleum products. In the same year, Sudan beef began to entering Malaysia markets. The two countries also had an agreement on double tax avoidance. A girl school funded by Malaysia was recently opened in Sudan in early 2017. After the United States revoked economic sanctions on Sudan on 6 October 2017, the country began to enhancing and expanding bilateral trade with Malaysia.

In October 2021, Malaysian-Sudanese bilateral relations were adversely affected by the Sudanese transitional government's seizure of Petronas' Sudanese assets on the allegation that they had been acquired through illegal means during the rule of ousted Sudanese President Omar al-Bashir. On 11 October, the Sudanese transitional government issued an arrest warrant for Petronas' country manager. In response, the Malaysian Government summoned the Sudanese charge d'affaires and urged the Sudanese government to honour the Bilateral Investment Promotion and Protection Treaty and to respect the sanctity of the Malaysian Embassy, which was housed in the same complex as the Petronas Sudan Complex in Khartoum. Petronas has also sought to cancel the manager's arrest warrant and submitted a request for arbitration at the World Bank's International Centre for Settlement of Investment Disputes (ICSID). Middle East Monitor contributor Nasim Ahmed opined that the Sudanese transitional government's actions against Malaysian, Turkish, Qatar and Chinese companies were part of a foreign policy shift to court Western investors.

== See also ==
- Foreign relations of Malaysia
- Foreign relations of Sudan
