= Russia–Sudan relations =

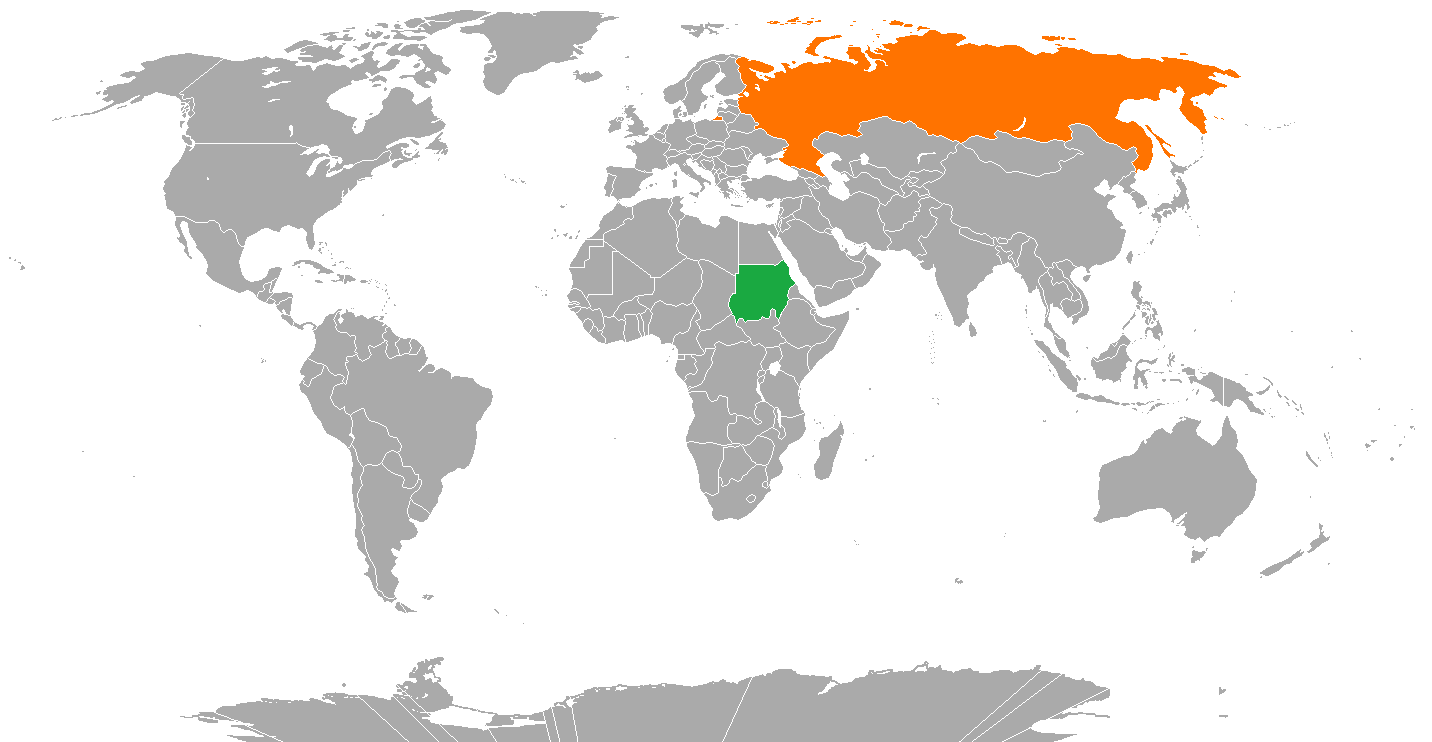

- Sudan: Russia

Diplomatic mission
- Embassy of Sudan, Moscow: Embassy of Russia, Khartoum

Russia–Sudan relations (Arabic: العلاقات الروسية السودانية, Russian: Российско-суданские отношения) are the bilateral relations between Russia and Sudan. Russia has an embassy in Khartoum and Sudan has an embassy in Moscow. They maintain a strong relationship.

== History ==
Chairman of the Sovereignty Council of Sudan Abdel Fattah al-Burhan with Russian President Vladimir Putin at the Russia–Africa Summit in Moscow, 30 October 2026

=== Soviet era ===
For decades, Russia and Sudan have maintained a strong economic and politically strategic partnership. Due to solidarity with both the United States and with the Soviet Union and with the allies of the two nations, Sudan declared neutrality and instead chose membership in the Non-Aligned Movement throughout the Cold War.

In 1967, in response to US support for Israel, Sudan severed relations with the United States. By 1970, 2000 advisors from Soviet Union and its satellites were present in Sudan. After the 1969 Sudanese coup d'état, the new government increased economic relations with the Soviet bloc, and in 1971, Soviet Union became the leading importer of Sudanese goods. Soviet-Sudanese relations were minorly damaged when, in 1971 members of the Sudanese Communist Party attempted to assassinate then-president Gaafar Nimeiry, and Nimeiry pegged the blame on the USSR, thus enhancing Sudanese relations with the West.

In 1977, in response to large scale Soviet aid to Ethiopia, Sudan expelled Soviet advisors and closed the military section in the Soviet embassy. The relations were damaged again when Sudan supported the Mujahadeen in Afghanistan when the USSR invaded in 1979. Sudan began to buy weapons from Egypt and China, instead of USSR. In 1985, Nimeiry was overthrown in a military coup, and the new government improved relations with USSR.

=== Russian Federation era ===
Diplomatic cooperation between the two countries dramatically got back on track during the late 1990s and early 2000s, when Vladimir Putin was elected the President, and then the Prime Minister of Russia, and along with Chinese leader Hu Jintao opposed UN Peacekeepers in Darfur. Russia strongly supports Sudan's territorial integrity and opposes the creation of an independent Darfurian state. Also, Russia is Sudan's strongest investment partner (in Europe) and political ally in Europe, and Russia has repeatedly and significantly regarded Sudan as an important global ally in the African continent. For decades there have been Sudanese college students studying in Russian universities.

During the 2008 attack on Omdurman and Khartoum, Justice and Equality Movement rebels from Darfur killed a Russian mercenary pilot by shooting his plane down when he tried to strafe them.

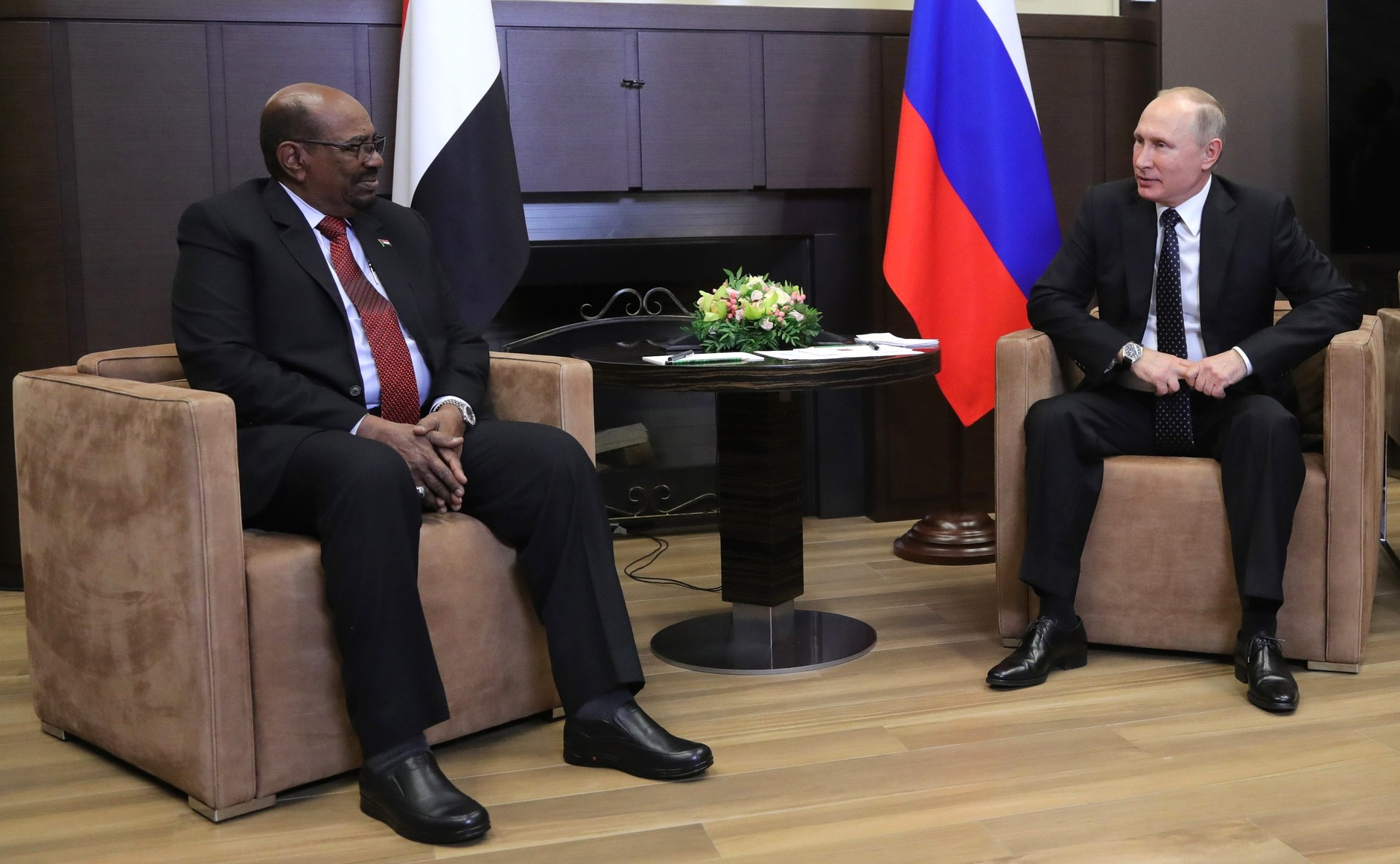
Vladimir Putin and Omar al-Bashir, 2017

Amnesty International criticized Russia for breaking the UN arms embargo on Darfur. Russians sold weapons like Mi-24 helicopters, Antonov 26 planes, Russian weapons sales to Sudan totaling 21 million dollars. It was reported these weapons were used to slaughter Darfur civilians. The report said Russia "cannot have been unaware of reports of serious violations of human rights and humanitarian law by the Sudanese security forces, But they have nevertheless continued to allow military equipment to be sent to Sudan." Russia was reported to "have been or should have been aware, several types of military equipment, including aircraft, have been deployed by the Sudanese armed forces for direct attacks on civilians and indiscriminate attacks in Darfur". The Janjaweed also used Russian small arms to murder and loot. Russian weapons also spread into neighboring Chad. In 2005 helicopters from Russia were sold to Sudan for 7 million pounds sterling. Photos show Russian helicopters in Darfur.

On August 25, 2017, the Russian ambassador to Sudan, Mirgayas Shirinsky, was found dead in his house in Khartoum.

In November 2017, President Omar al-Bashir credited Russian military intervention in the Syrian Civil War for saving Syria. Sudan is among the few countries that officially recognized the annexation of Crimea by the Russian Federation and voted against United Nations General Assembly Resolution 68/262 (which condemned Russian annexation of Ukrainian territory), which demonstrated the close relations between Russia and Sudan.

In July 2022, Russia was caught plundering gold from a processing plant for the Wagner-linked and US-sanctioned Meroe Gold near Abidiya in Sudan to finance its invasion of Ukraine.

== Military ==
SIPRI reports that only 8 percent of Sudanese arms are Chinese, and that Russian arms actually make up the majority, at 87 percent. Russia is the major weapons supplier to the Sudan.

In 2019, Sudan and Russia signed an agreement, which reportedly gives Russian Navy access to Sudanese ports. In November 2020, Vladimir Putin announced that the Russian Navy would proceed with building a base capable of hosting 300 personnel and four warships on Sudan's Red Sea coast. In December 2020, the agreement to build the base was signed, which would give Russia a naval base in Port Sudan for at least 25 years. This was compared to Russia's naval base in Tartus, Syria. However in June 2021, the Associated Press reported that the agreement was not ratified by Sudan's parliament and the Sudanese military indicated it would review the agreement. Sudan’s Chief of General Staff, Gen. Mohammed Othman al-Hussein stated, “We are negotiating a possible review to this deal, to ensure that our interests and our profits are taken into account.”

In February 2023, Russia's foreign minister Sergey Lavrov met Sudanese officials in Khartoum, including the commander-in-chief of Sudanese Armed Forces Abdel Fattah al-Burhan, leader of Rapid Support Forces Mohamed Hamdan Dagalo, and acting foreign minister Ali Al-Sadiq Ali to improve relations amid the International sanctions during the Russo-Ukrainian War, and to conclude a review of an agreement to build a naval base with up to 300 Russian troops in Port Sudan, awaiting ratification from yet-to-be-formed legislative body in Sudan.

== See also ==
- Foreign relations of Russia
- Foreign relations of Sudan
