= Bulgaria–Sudan relations =

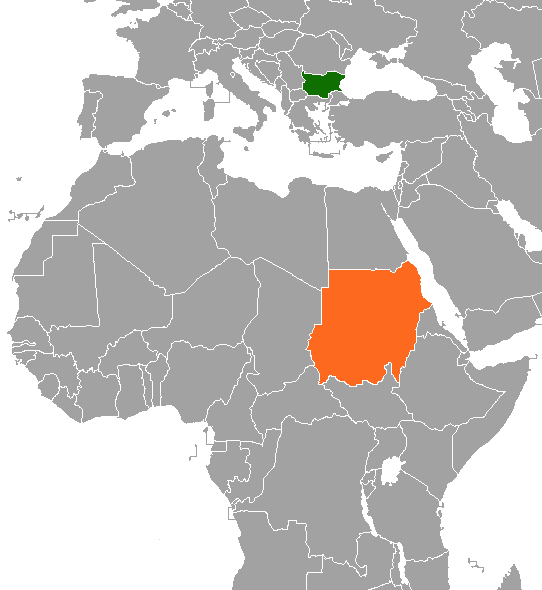

- Bulgaria: Sudan

Bulgaria and Sudan established diplomatic relations on July 1, 1956. In 1967, Bulgaria sent the first Bulgarian ambassador to Khartoum. The activities of the Bulgarian embassy in Khartoum were terminated in April 1990, and later reestablished in March, 2005. In 2006 the General Consulate of the Sudan, in Sofia, Bulgaria was upgraded to the rank of embassy.

== History ==
Bulgaria was one of the first countries which recognised (in 1956) Sudan's independence, at which time relations were established. The two nations have cooperated on industrial and agricultural products. Pilots from Bulgaria annually do crop dusting to assist Sudan's cotton farms. In April 2002, trade agreements were executed in Khartoum between the Bulgarian and Sudanese governments.

According to Abdullahi Hamad al-Azreg, Consul General from the Sudan to Bulgaria, six thousand students from the Sudan were educated in Bulgarian universities from the 1950s through the 1990s. Two thousand Bulgarians lived in the Sudan in 2004. Between 1997 and 1999, the Bulgarian consortium Balkan constructed roads in Sudan, and negotiations were made in 2002 to settle the remaining $1.3 million in debts owed.

== Bilateral agreements ==
Bulgaria and Sudan signed an agreement of September 18, 1967, providing for mutual recognition of scientific degrees, and other academic credentials, between the two countries; an agreement on March 1, 1969, to ease visa requirements for citizens of one nation to visit the other; an agreement on December 29, 1970, for aviation communication between the two nations; and a maritime agreement between Bulgaria and Sudan, reached on November 13, 1970. In 2002, Bulgaria and Sudan signed an agreement of reciprocal recognition of most favored nation status, and an agreement on reciprocal investment promotion and protection.

== Military assistance ==
In 2000, Sudan and Bulgaria signed an agreement of several hundred million dollars for the export of Bulgarian weapons and military equipment to the Sudan, including mobile missile launch pads and shoulder-held anti-tank missiles.

In 2002, the manufacturer Beta, located in Cherven Bryag, had begun the export of 122mm self-propelling cannons to the Sudan, and continued to do so after the United Nations imposed an embargo upon military trade by member nations to Sudan. Despite this, the exports of Beta cannons continued, with the cannons being declared as "spare parts for construction vehicles". Beta managed to export goods worth half a billion US dollars until the violations were exposed in 2003.

== See also ==
- Foreign relations of Bulgaria
- Foreign relations of Sudan
