= Sudan–Syria relations =

Bilateral relations

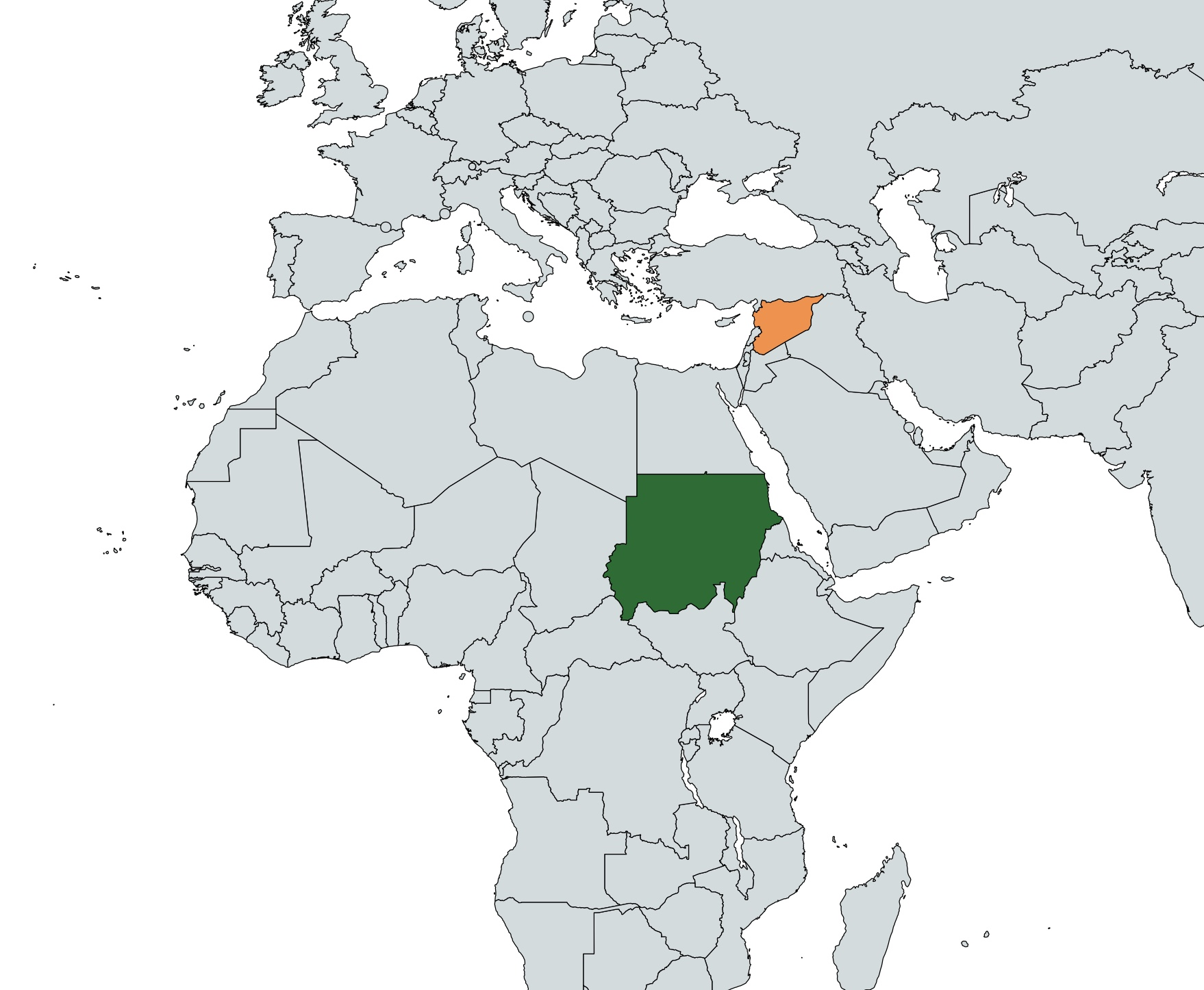

- Sudan: Syria

Diplomatic mission
- Sudanese Embassy, Damascus: Syrian Embassy, Khartoum (Note: Also responsible for Syrian interests in Eritrea, Ethiopia, Central African Republic, and Uganda.)

Sudan–Syria relations were established on 28 January 1957, when the ambassador of Syria to Sudan (resident in Cairo, Egypt), Abdel Rahman el-Azm, was accredited. Syria has an embassy in Khartoum, while Sudan has an embassy in Damascus.

Both nations are predominantly Muslim and are members of the Arab League. Sudan and Syria have maintained diplomatic and political ties since their independence in the mid-20th century, shaped by regional politics, pan-Arab unity, and external alliances.

== History ==
Sudan and Syria established formal diplomatic relations on 28 January 1957 with the accreditation of Syria's ambassador to Sudan.

== Regional context ==
Both countries joined the Arab League shortly after independence (Sudan in 1956, Syria as a founding member in 1945). Both are also part of the Non-Aligned Movement, participating in the First NAM Summit in 1961, which aimed to maintain independence from Cold War superpowers.

During the Cold War, Syria maintained close ties with the Soviet Union, which supported its military and economic sectors. Sudan, particularly in the mid-1970s, pursued closer ties with the United States to diversify its international partnerships and attract foreign investment.

Despite differing alignments, Sudan and Syria signed a Bilateral Investment Treaty (BIT) on 7 January 2000, which entered into force on 1 September 2001, to strengthen economic cooperation.

Following the outbreak of the Syrian Civil War in 2011, Sudan accepted a large number of refugees from the conflict, with some estimated it to be as high as 150,000.

== See also ==
- Foreign relations of Sudan
- Foreign relations of Syria
