= Sudan–Turkey relations =

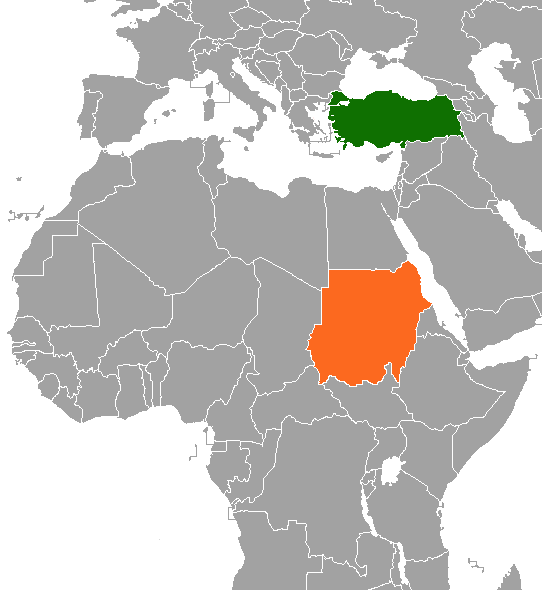

- Sudan: Turkey

Diplomatic mission
- Embassy of Sudan, Ankara: Embassy of Turkey, Khartoum

Sudan and Turkey have enjoyed a relatively close relationship, owning by previous historical links between two countries since the Ottoman Empire. Due to this historical tie, Sudan and Turkey share an Ottoman legacy, though little comparing to other Arab states. Sudan has an embassy in Ankara, while Turkey has an embassy in Khartoum.

== History before mid-20th century ==
The Ottomans, represented by Egypt of Muhammad Ali, conquered Sudan in early 19th century, which marked the era as Turkiyah (Turkish rule). Under the Turkiyah, Sudanese slavery was soon abolished as part of Tanzimat reforms, and economy of Sudan started to improve. Yet, due to the Ottomans' favoritism toward religious orthodoxy, it was met with resistance from the Sudanese.

From 1870s onward, weakening Ottoman Empire paved way for the rebellion led by Muhammad Ahmad against the Turks. It was met with angers from both Egyptians/Ottomans alike, after Muhammad Ahmad proclaimed himself as mahdi, ignited the Mahdist War resulting with heavy military defeat of the Ottomans under British commands to the hand of the Sudanese Mahdists. It wasn't until 1890s that saw the Ottomans, reorganized by Herbert Kitchener, re-conquered Sudan in a costly and bloody war under the banner of the Ottoman Turks/Egyptians.

With the outbreak of World War I, Britain separated Egypt and Sudan together from the Ottomans, and the two countries would have no official relations until mid-20th century. Nonetheless, the Sultanate of Darfur at 1916 proclaimed support to the Ottomans, which was marked by British annexation of Darfur to Sudan.

== Modern relations ==
With the independence of Sudan from Egypt at 1956, Sudan established relations with Turkey, with Turkey among the earliest nations to open an embassy in Sudan. However, for most of the late 20th century, Sudan–Turkey ties were characterized by remoteness and lack of interest, as Turkey has more interests in the Middle East and Balkans, while Sudan sat into political turmoil. Despite this, relations were cordial under Gaafar Nimeiry, but had become cold under Omar al-Bashir from 1990s to 2010s.

In the 2010s and after years of neglecting the relationship, Turkey, headed by its Islamist president Recep Tayyip Erdoğan, started to divert its attention to Africa, including Sudan, which has boosted their relationship. Turkey has increased their presence in Sudan. One of the most notable is the lease of the Sudanese island Suakin to Turkey in a 99-year contract, to which regional rivals like Egypt and Saudi Arabia have reacted with skepticism and suspicion. Turkey has denied attempts to build a military base in Suakin.

=== Sudanese protests ===
Turkey has voiced support to Omar al-Bashir's Government in Sudan during the wave of growing anti-Bashir protest, and has pledged to send aids and supports to Sudan battling against protesters.

== Diplomatic mission ==
- Sudan has an embassy in Ankara and a consulate in Istanbul.
- Turkey has an embassy in Khartoum.

== See also ==
- Foreign relations of Sudan
- Foreign relations of Turkey
