= Sudan–Ukraine relations =

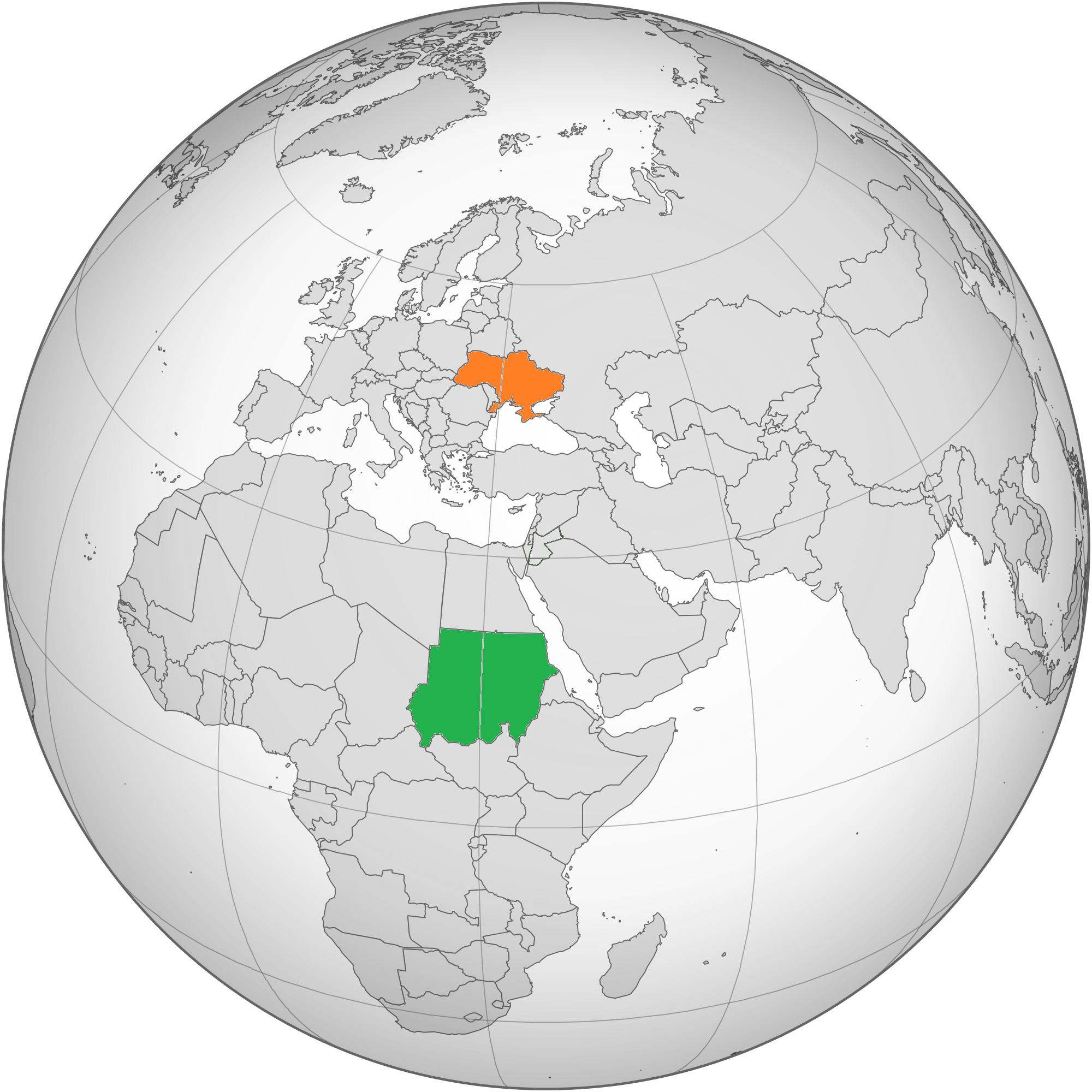

- Sudan: Ukraine

Sudan and Ukraine have had diplomatic relations for several decades. Ukraine has a non-resident ambassador in Cairo.

== History ==
Sudan recognized Ukrainian independence on 25 April 1992, establishing diplomatic relations soon after Ukrainian independence from the Soviet Union.

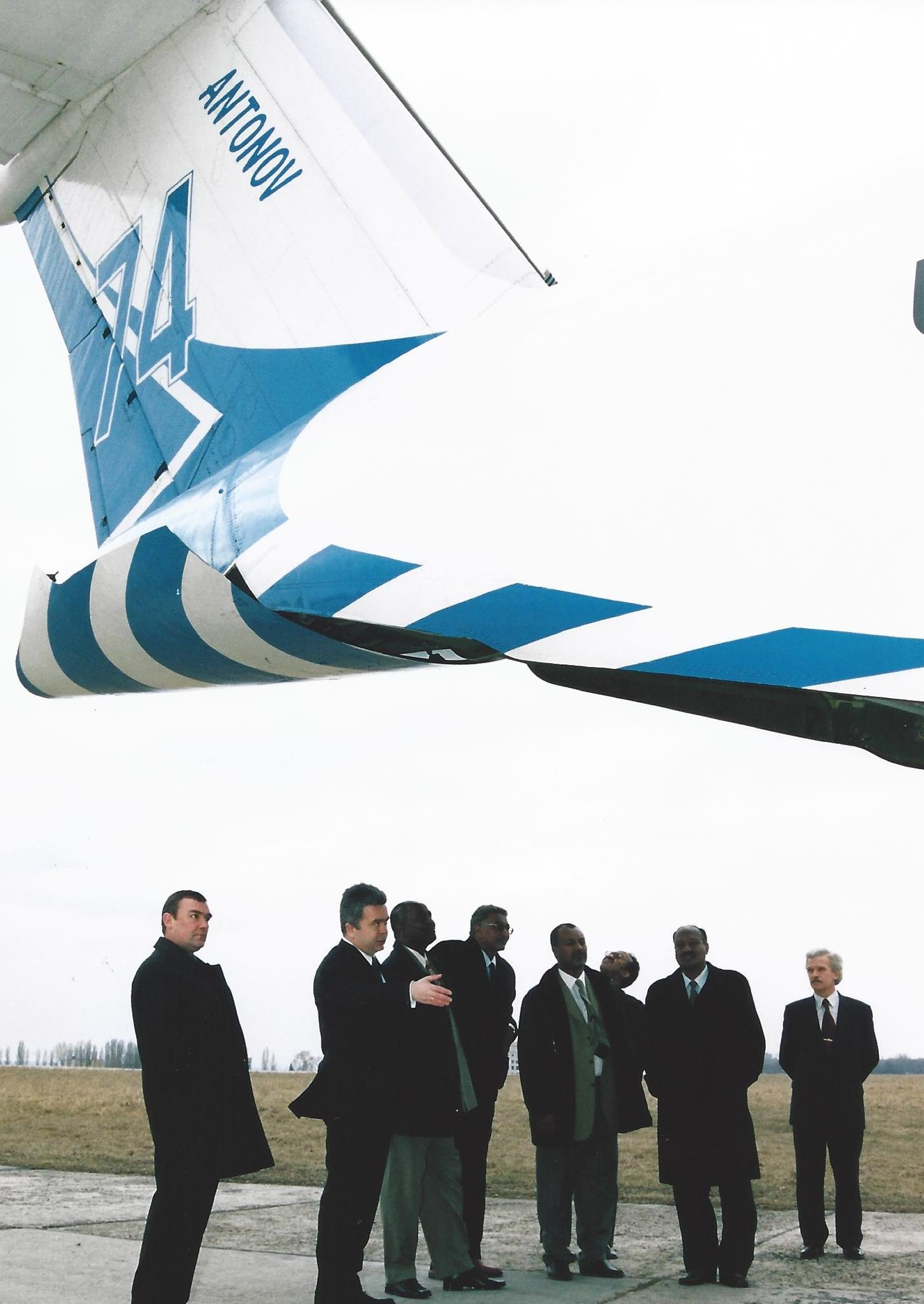
Sudanese government officials disembarking from an aircraft in 2004, Kharkiv, Ukraine

In 2002, the first visit by a major Sudanese official to Ukraine took place, as the head of Sudan's Ministry of Foreign Affairs visited. Another delegation visited in 2009 to develop agricultural cooperation.

After the beginning of the Russo–Ukrainian War in which Russia covertly invaded and occupied parts of Ukraine, Sudan's delegation to the UN General Assembly "mainly took a pro-Russian position" from 2014 to 2020, voting against resolutions affirming Ukraine's territorial integrity. However, Sudan has supplied Ukraine with weapons after the beginning of the full-scale Russian invasion of Ukraine in 2022. In turn, Ukraine has militarily assisted Abdel Fattah al-Burhan's government directly during Sudan's civil war that began in 2023 due to shared interests in combating Russia, which backs the Rapid Support Forces in Sudan. In August 2023, it was revealed that Ukraine planned to build a new embassy in Sudan, as part of a larger strategy of establishing better relations with African countries.

== Educational and cultural exchange ==
As of 2019, there were 332 Sudanese students studying abroad in Ukraine.

== Diplomatic missions ==
The Embassy of Sudan, Ukraine was established in September 2013. There is also an Honorary Consulate of Ukraine in Khartoum, Sudan.

== See also ==
- Foreign relations of Sudan
- Foreign relations of Ukraine
