= United Nations Security Council Resolution 1044 =

UN Security Council Resolution 1044
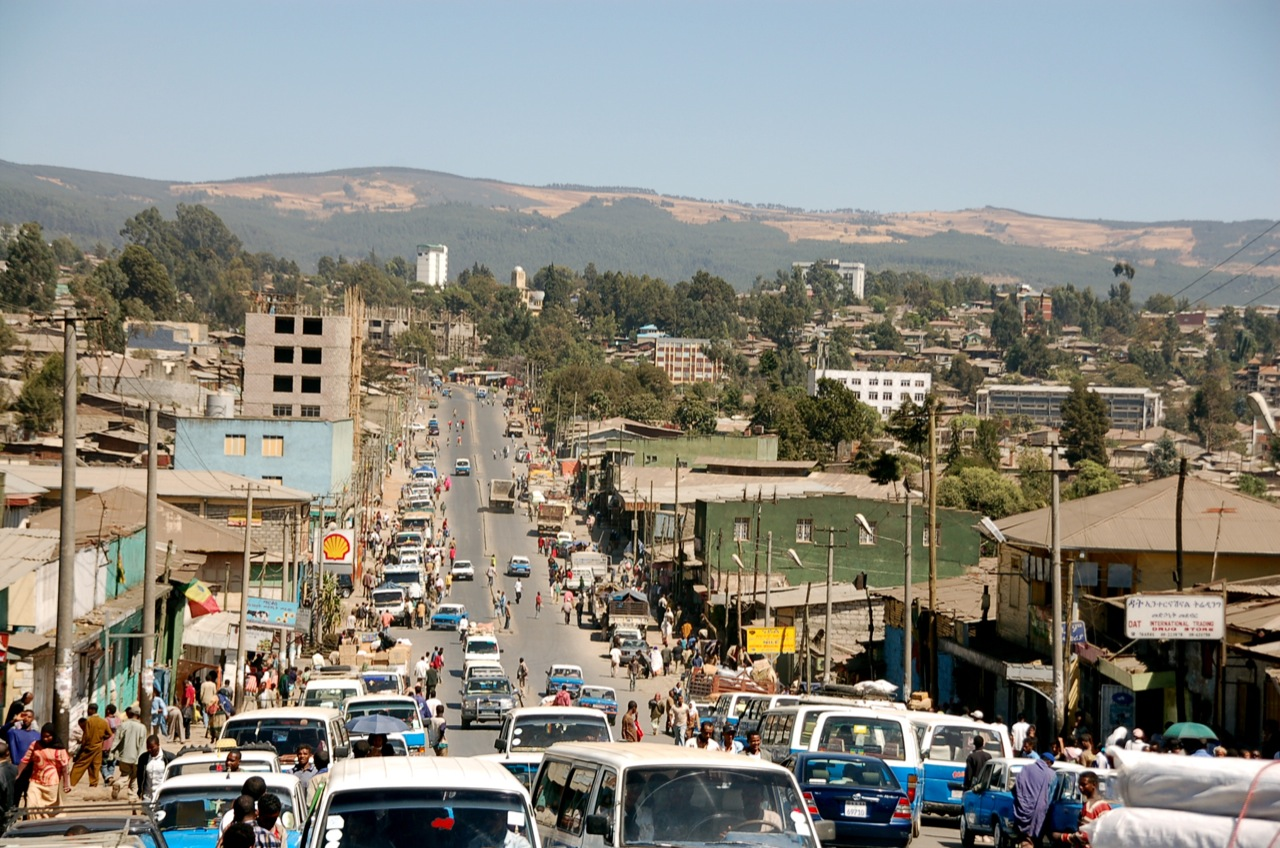
- Ethiopian capital Addis Ababa
- Date: 31 January 1996
- Meeting no.: 3,627
- Code: S/RES/1044 (Document)
- Subject: Letter from Ethiopia to President of Security Council concerning Sudan
- Voting summary: 15 voted for; None voted against; None abstained
- Result: Adopted

Security Council composition
- Permanent members: China; France; Russia; United Kingdom; United States
- Non-permanent members: Botswana; Chile; Egypt; Guinea-Bissau; Germany; Honduras; Indonesia; Italy; South Korea; Poland

United Nations Security Council resolution 1044, adopted unanimously on 31 January 1996, after noting the assassination attempt on President of Egypt Hosni Mubarak at an Organisation of African Unity (OAU) summit in the Ethiopian capital Addis Ababa on 26 June 1995, demanded that the Government of Sudan comply with OAU requests to extradite suspects sheltered in the country to Ethiopia.

The preamble of the resolution expressed dissatisfaction over international terrorism which resulted in innocent deaths, the deterioration of international relations and put the security of countries at risk. There was a need to strengthen international co-operation in adopting measures to prevent, combat and eliminate all forms of terrorism. The Council noted OAU's earlier considering the attack as aimed not only at Mobarak, but at the sovereignty of Ethiopia, and at Africa as a whole. It was regretting that Sudan had not complied with OAU requests to extradite suspects.

The Security Council condemned the assassination attempt and deplored the violation of Ethiopia's sovereignty and the attempt to disturb the peace and security in that country and the region as a whole. The efforts of Ethiopia to resolve the issue bilaterally and regionally was welcomed, while Sudan was called upon to extradite the 3 suspects to Ethiopia in accordance with the 1964 Extradition Treaty between both countries, and not to support forms of terrorism or shelter terrorist suspects.

The international community were urged to encourage Sudan respond positively to the OAU's requests, while the Secretary-General Boutros Boutros-Ghali was requested to report on the situation within 60 days to the council.

After Sudan refused to comply, it was sanctioned by the United Nations Security Council Resolution 1054 and United Nations Security Council Resolution 1070.

== See also ==
- Foreign relations of Egypt
- Foreign relations of Ethiopia
- Foreign relations of Sudan
- List of United Nations Security Council Resolutions 1001 to 1100 (1995–1997)
