= Qatar–Sudan relations =

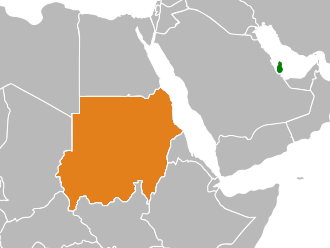

- Qatar: Sudan

Diplomatic mission
- Embassy of Qatar, Khartoum: Embassy of Sudan, Doha

Qatar–Sudan relations are the bilateral relations between the State of Qatar and the Republic of the Sudan. Relations were first established in 1972, when Qatar inaugurated its embassy in Sudan's capital city, Khartoum. Both countries are members of the Organisation of Islamic Cooperation and Non-Aligned Movement.

== Diplomatic missions ==
Qatar maintains an embassy on Doha Street, located in the El Manshiya Area of Sudan's capital city Khartoum, while Sudan has an embassy in the Diplomatic Area of Doha, Qatar.

== State visits ==
Sudanese president Omar al-Bashir paid an official visit to Qatar in October 2017 to discuss ways in which to further develop bilateral ties.

== History ==
In 2009, Qatar, with the help of Libya, hosted and mediated discussions between Sudan and Chad, who were at odds over allegations of their respective governments providing support to opposition groups within each other's countries since 2005.

A peace agreement between the Sudanese government and the Liberation and Justice Movement, a Darfur-based rebel group, was mediated by Qatar in 2011. The deal stipulated financial aid from Qatar and several other donors. Another peace agreement was concluded with the help of Qatar in 2013, between Sudan's government and the Justice and Equality Movement.

=== Qatar diplomatic crisis ===
On 5 June 2017, a number of states led by Saudi Arabia cut ties with and imposed a boycott on Qatar. Despite being largely dependent on financial support from the countries which spearheaded the boycott, Sudan declined to align itself with the Saudi-led bloc, as Qatar was also a major financier and political supporter of Sudan. On the same day that the row erupted, the Sudanese government relayed its concerns about the developing crisis and volunteered to mediate discussions between all parties.

== Economic relations ==
Qatar is among the largest Arab investors in Sudan. Qatari Diar announced the Mushairab project in Sudan in 2006, which would witness substantial real estate development spread over an area of 206,000 sq meters at a cost of $400 million, with construction starting in 2009. Hassad Food, a Qatari agricultural company, signed a $1 billion deal in 2009 to lease farmland in Sudan. In late 2017, it was announced that Qatar Mining Company would be investing $1 billion in Sudan. During the same period, QNB Group was reported as operating 14 branches across Sudan.

== Cultural relations ==
In an effort to promote tourism in Sudan, Qatar Museums, on behalf of the Qatari government, launched the Qatar-Sudan Archaeological Project (QSAP) in 2012. As of 2017, the project has funded 42 archaeological missions with a sum of $50 million. Sudan also received $135 million from Qatar in 2014, to be allotted towards the financing of 29 archaeological projects in the country.

== Foreign aid ==
In 1985, Qatar implemented a poultry production project in Sudan, intended bolster its food security, valued at LS 5 million through the Food and Agriculture Organization (FAO).

To help alleviate the poor living conditions and provide housing for displaced peoples and refugees in Sudan's Darfur region, a deal was reached in 2017 between the government of Sudan and the Qatar Fund for Development in which $70 million would be allocated to construct model villages in the region. In response to urgent humanitarian needs, Qatar Charity (QC) took the initiative to provide relief aid on April 30, 2023 that benefited patients, emergency teams and medical personnel in hospitals in the Sudanese capital, Khartoum. The relief aid included more than 28 tonnes of food and ready-made meals, distributed to hospitals in Khartoum state, which suffer from food shortages because of the events, in co-ordination with officials in the Ministry of Health and the Humanitarian Aid Commission in Sudan. QC was also able to repatriate the students of Taiba Education City to their families safely and worked to monitor the situation of its sponsored persons on a regular basis to provide support of all kinds. Qatar Charity has 12,516 sponsored persons in Sudan. On 6 and 7 May 2023, Qatar Charity provided a total of 60 tons of relief aid to Sudan and evacuated more than 300 people.

In March 2024, Qatar sent 23 tons of food aid to Sudan via an ongoing air bridge for humanitarian aid. In addition, the Qatar Fund for Development, Qatar Red Crescent Society and the Sudanese Red Crescent signed a cooperation agreement to support the recovery from losses of assets and property due to the war in Sudan.

Qatar Fund for Development (QFFD) delegation visited two shelter centers in Port Sudan to inaugurate shelter tents and distribute food baskets. The delegation, in collaboration with Qatar Red Crescent and Qatar Charity, delivered food baskets to beneficiaries via the Qatari air bridge and inspected school tents. The visit was part of Qatar's ongoing efforts to support the Sudanese people during difficult times. The aid included 71.2 tons of medical aid.

== Military aid ==
Sudan and Qatar have sought bilateral military cooperation over the years. In the current conflict, Qatar has discreetly supplied the Sudanese Armed Forces (SAF) with weaponry. Additionally, Doha reportedly provided the armed forces with six Chinese warplanes.

== Migration ==
An estimated 60,000 Sudanese expatriates reside in Qatar. As one of the earliest national groups to migrate to Qatar, many of the country's civil society positions were filled by Sudanese citizens in its pre-independence years. There is a Sudanese school in Qatar located in the Abu Hamour area of Doha with upwards of 1,800 students enrolled.

== See also ==
- Foreign relations of Qatar
- Foreign relations of Sudan
