= Israel–Sudan relations =

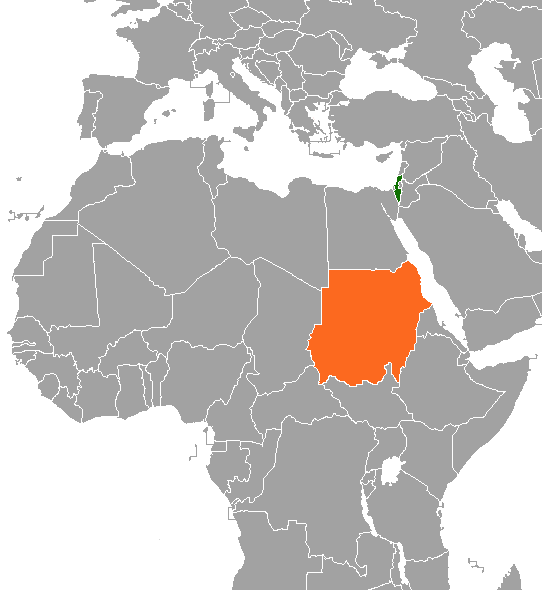

- Israel: Sudan

Israel–Sudan relations are the diplomatic ties between Israel and Sudan. In October 2020, the two countries announced that they would establish diplomatic relations. On 2 February 2023, they officially finalized a deal to normalize relations, but was postponed indefinitely due to the ongoing civil war in the country, as well as the War in Gaza that began in October 2023.

From 1958 to April 20, 2021, Sudanese law forbade establishing relations with Israel, and outlawed business with citizens of Israel as well as business relationships with Israeli companies or companies with Israeli interests. The law also forbade the direct or indirect import of any Israeli goods.

== History ==
In the early 1950s, Anglo-Egyptian Sudan – then still not independent – had active trade relations with Israel.

=== Normalization ===
In January 2016, Sudanese Foreign Minister Ibrahim Ghandour floated normalized ties with Israel provided the U.S. government lifted economic sanctions. Sudanese President Omar al-Bashir followed that up by saying in an interview with Saudi newspaper Okaz, "Even if Israel had conquered Syria, it would not have inflicted the destruction taking place there right now, would not have killed the number of people killed so far and would not have expelled people the way they are being expelled now."

Israel flew medics and equipment to Sudan to try to save a diplomat, Najwa Gadah Aldam, who worked as a political adviser to the president of Uganda Yoweri Museveni, when she was infected and later died from COVID-19.

It was revealed in early September 2016 that Israel had contacted the U.S. government and other Western countries and encouraged them to take steps to improve relations with Sudan in the wake of the break in relations between the Arab-African country and Iran in the prior year. Kara later revealed at an event in Beersheba that he was maintaining contacts with many Sudanese officials, and did not deny that a Sudanese official had recently visited Israel. In February 2020, Israeli Prime Minister Benjamin Netanyahu and the Chairman of the Sovereignty Council of Sudan, Abdel Fattah al-Burhan, met in Uganda, where they agreed to normalize the ties between the two countries. Later that month, Israeli planes were allowed to fly over Sudan.

On 22 October 2020, an Israeli delegation visited Sudan, where they met with Abdel Fattah al-Burhan for talks on the normalization of ties between the two countries. On 23 October 2020, Israel and Sudan agreed to a deal to normalize ties. Not long thereafter, the United States reciprocated by removing Sudan from the list of State Sponsors of Terrorism. In the meantime, Egyptian president Abdel Fattah el-Sisi welcomed the normalization agreement.

On 2 February 2023, Israeli Minister of Foreign Affairs Eli Cohen visited Khartoum and agreed with Abdel Fattah al-Burhan to sign the normalization of relations in Washington, D.C. in a few months' time.

On 16 April 2023, it was announced that Israel, through the Mossad and the Israeli Foreign Ministry, is participating in the mediation and calming efforts between the RSF and the army following the outbreak of fighting between the two groups. Against the background of the peace agreement that is taking shape with Sudan, Israel is in contact with the two leaders of the factions in the conflict - the head of the Sudanese Military Council, Abdel Fattah al-Burhan, on the one hand, and General Mohamed Hamdan Dagalo, the leader of the RSF, on the other. Israeli officials were sure that there would be a signing of agreements for the establishment of a government that would finalize the normalization with Israel even before Eid al-Fitr on April 20, and that the government would be established by the end of May, but they were surprised by the outbreak of violent conflict that could damage the process.

=== Gaza War ===
In March 2025, reports surfaced that the US and Israel had approached Sudan, Somalia, and Somaliland about accepting Palestinians who have been displaced from their homes in Gaza due to the Israeli military's policy of mass evacuations. US and Israeli officials confirmed talks with Somalia and Somaliland, while Sudan reportedly rejected the proposal. Not long thereafter Israel became one of the first countries to recognize Somaliland as a fully independent state.

These efforts followed a suggestion by US President Donald Trump in early 2025 to forcibly transfer the Palestinian population, a plan widely condemned by Palestinians and other Middle Eastern countries.

== See also ==
- Foreign relations of Israel
- Foreign relations of Sudan
- History of the Jews in Sudan
