= United Nations Security Council Resolution 1054 =

UN Security Council Resolution 1054
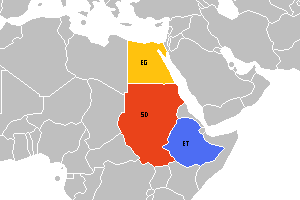
- Egypt (yellow), Sudan (orange), and Ethiopia (blue)
- Date: 26 April 1996
- Meeting no.: 3,660
- Code: S/RES/1054 (Document)
- Subject: Letter from Ethiopia to President of Security Council concerning Sudan
- Voting summary: 13 voted for; None voted against; 2 abstained
- Result: Adopted

Security Council composition
- Permanent members: China; France; Russia; United Kingdom; United States
- Non-permanent members: Botswana; Chile; Egypt; Guinea-Bissau; Germany; Honduras; Indonesia; Italy; South Korea; Poland

United Nations Security Council resolution 1054, adopted on 26 April 1996, after reaffirming Resolution 1044 (1996) concerning the assassination attempt on Egyptian President Hosni Mubarak at an Organisation of African Unity (OAU) summit in the Ethiopian capital Addis Ababa on 26 June 1995, the Council placed sanctions on the Government of Sudan after its failure to comply with OAU requests to extradite suspects sheltered in the country to Ethiopia.

The Security Council expressed its alarm at the assassination attempt and was convinced that those responsible be brought to justice. The OAU considered the attack to be an attack on all of Africa, and not just on the President of Egypt or the sovereignty of Ethiopia. It was noted that Sudan had failed to comply with OAU requests, which constituted a threat to international peace and security.

Acting under Chapter VII of the United Nations Charter, the Council demanded that Sudan immediately extraditable the three suspects to Ethiopia and desist from supporting terrorist activities or sheltering terrorists in its territory. The following provisions would come into effect at 00:01 EST on 10 May 1996 unless Sudan complied with the resolution. All countries were to:

(a) reduce staff at their diplomatic missions in Sudan and impose travel restrictions on members of the Sudanese government or military;
(b) refrain from holding international conferences in Sudan;
(c) report to the Secretary-General Boutros Boutros-Ghali within 60 days on measures they had taken to give effect to the resolution. Only 40 states complied with this provision.

The Secretary-General was requested within 60 days to report on the implementation of this resolution and the council would then determine whether Sudan had complied with the requirements.

China and Russia abstained from the vote on Resolution 1054, which was approved by the other 13 members of the council. Sudan described the sanctions as "shocking" and "unfair", calling them an attempt to isolate the country. Further sanctions were placed on the country in Resolution 1070.

== See also ==
- Foreign relations of Egypt
- Foreign relations of Ethiopia
- Foreign relations of Sudan
- List of United Nations Security Council Resolutions 1001 to 1100 (1995–1997)
