= Foreign trade of Sudan =

Sudan Foreign trade

Exports of Sudan by product category (2019) Chemical products Transportation Machines Mineral products Plastics and rubbers Metals Foodstuffs Precious metals Textiles Instruments Animal products Vegetable products Paper goods Footwear and headwear Miscellaneous Stone and glass Wood products Animal and vegetable bi-products Animal hides Arts and antiques Weapons

Sudan's exports in 2008 amounted to US$12.4 billion, and its imports totaled US$8.9 billion. Agricultural products dominated Sudanese exports until Sudan began to export petroleum and petroleum products. By 2000 the value of petroleum-based products surpassed the total of all other exports combined. By 2008, they had reached US$11.6 billion and have accounted for 80 to 94 percent of all export revenue since 2000, the result of expanded oil production, as well as higher oil prices. Because oil provides such a large proportion of export earnings, Sudan is now vulnerable to the volatility of the international price of oil.

Sudan had long been the world's second largest exporter of long-staple cotton. Cotton exports provided more than 50 percent of total export revenues in the 1960s but declined to only 1.1 percent of export revenues in 2008. Gum arabic was in second place until the 1960s, but its importance was even less than that of cotton in 2008. Livestock was the most important non-oil product in 2002, displacing cash crops. The government encouraged the increase in livestock production, especially camels, goats, sheep, and cattle, but the export of livestock declined dramatically thereafter, with proceeds providing only 0.3 percent of export revenues in 2008. Sesame increased in importance in the 1990s and displaced cotton as the most important export commodity in 1996, until petroleum exports became dominant. Sesame remained the most important agricultural export product, providing 2.3 percent of export revenues in 2008. Other important exports in 2008 were gold, sugar, and peanuts.

The share of machinery and transport equipment was 32.8 percent of the value of total imports in 2008. Large quantities of capital goods were imported, mainly for the development and expansion of the oil industry and the expansion of related infrastructure. Government plans for self-sufficiency through the development of import-substitution industries achieved only limited success, as manufactured goods still equaled 24.7 percent of the value of imports. Economic growth and the need for a peace dividend following the signing of the January 2005 CPA, led to increased import spending in 2004–6, meaning that there was a trade deficit during those years. The trade balance returned to a surplus in 2007.

== History ==
In the early Condominium era, Egypt was Sudan's main customer. The development of the Gezira Scheme, however, resulted in large-scale exports of cotton to the United Kingdom, which by the end of the 1920s was purchasing about 80 percent of Sudanese exports. At the time of Sudanese independence, Britain continued to be the largest customer. During the 1960s, India, West Germany, and Italy emerged as major buyers; late in the decade, Japan also became a major customer.

After the 1969 Sudanese coup d'état, Khartoum took steps to expand trade with the Soviet Union and Eastern Europe. Exports to the Soviet Union rose dramatically in 1970 and 1971 as that country became Sudan's leading customer. After the 1971 Sudanese coup d'état, however, relations deteriorated, and Soviet purchases dropped almost to nil.

Saudi Arabia became Sudan's main export market in the late 1980s, buying sorghum and livestock. Britain also remained an important export destination. Other major customers were France and China. The United States, although not one of Sudan's largest purchasers, became a major customer in the later 1980s, mainly buying cotton, gum arabic, and peanuts. Saudi Arabia continued to be the leading export market throughout the second half of the 1990s, purchasing 20 percent of Sudan's exports, especially livestock. However, the development of the oil industry changed the direction of trade, with China and Japan purchasing 63 percent of Sudan's exports in 2001. The trend continued as the oil industry developed further, with East Asia replacing the Middle East as the main export market. In 2007 China absorbed 67.9 percent of Sudan's exports, followed by Japan (19.0 percent), South Korea (2.0) and Saudi Arabia (1.7 percent).

Sudan's imports come from a wide range of countries, led by Saudi Arabia in the late 1980s. In 1989 Saudi Arabia supplied nearly 14.1 percent of Sudan's total imports, with petroleum the chief import item. Britain was Sudan's main import source until 1980; in the late 1980s, it became Khartoum's second largest provider, supplying an estimated 8.3 percent of the country's imports in 1989. Britain had well-established commercial and banking operations in Khartoum and a leading position in exporting manufactured goods, vehicles, tobacco, beverages, chemicals, and machinery to Sudan.

Iraq was a prime source of Sudan's imports through 1978, because it was the principal supplier of crude petroleum, a function that was taken over by Saudi Arabia in 1979 after Iraq cut off oil supplies because Sudan backed Egypt in the Egypt–Israel peace treaty. In the last years of the al-Numayri government (1969–85), bilateral trade with Egypt declined sharply, but in April 1988, and again in June 1991, Sudan and Egypt signed large trade agreements. Improved relations with Libya enabled Tripoli to become Sudan's third largest import supplier in 1989. In January of that year, Sudan and Tripoli signed an agreement for Sudan to buy Libyan crude oil, and in December Sudan agreed to purchase Libyan fuel, chemicals, fertilizer, cement, and caustic soda.

China was the prime import supplier in 2007, having superseded Saudi Arabia in 2004. In 2007 China provided 27.9 percent of Sudan's imports, followed by Saudi Arabia (7.5 percent), India (6.3 percent) and Egypt (5.6 percent). Libya, which previously had supplied most of Sudan's imports, especially petroleum products, saw its exports decline dramatically from 15 percent of Sudan's total imports in 1999, as demand for imported refined products ended.

== Balance of payments ==
An accurate presentation of Sudan's balance of payments—the summary in money terms of transactions with the rest of the world—was hampered in the past by what foreign economists considered understatements in official statistics of imports and public-sector loans. The balance of trade from 1960 through 1999 usually showed a deficit, except for 1973, in the current account (covering trade, services, and transfer transactions). From 1973 until 2000 (when Sudan became self-sufficient in petroleum and petroleum products), the balance of trade was unfavorably affected by higher petroleum-import costs as well as by the higher costs of other imports that resulted from worldwide inflation caused by oil price increases. The impact on the balance of payments was especially serious because of its coincidence with the implementation after 1973 of an intensive development program that required greatly increased imports.

Beginning in 1999, export receipts increased dramatically as Sudan began to export oil. In 2000 export earnings increased to US$1.9 billion, with oil earnings accounting for 78 percent of the total. Revenues continued to increase to US$4.8 billion in 2005 as oil prices remained high. The development of the oil industry not only increased export earnings, but also saved foreign exchange as Sudan became self-sufficient in refined petroleum products. The sum of those changes produced trade surpluses in 2000 and 2001—the first surpluses in recent history. The years 2005 and 2006 fell into deficit as surging imports and delays in bringing new oil concessions on stream had a negative effect on the trade balance. Although 2007 and 2008 produced trade surpluses once again, preliminary information for 2009 revealed a deficit produced by a decline in the value of oil exports.

The services sector (insurance, travel, and other) and investment income regularly experiences a net loss, which has increased since oil exports began. Service debits reached US$2.9 billion in 2007 and 2008, as a result of costs associated with the increasing volume of Sudanese imports, as well as the increasing costs of transporting the government's share of oil to market.

Investment-income debits increased as a result of the repatriation of profits of the foreign firms that have developed the oil sector. In 2008 income debits reached US$5.7 billion.

Transfers usually had a positive balance, but they were insufficient to offset the usual deficit in trade and services. They were composed mainly of remittances from Sudan's overseas workforce, exceeding US$20 million in 2007, according to official data. The growth of remittances reflected the strong economic growth in the Gulf States where many Sudanese worked, and also the increased confidence in the Sudanese banking system, which encouraged expatriate Sudanese to transfer and convert remittances through official channels rather than by informal methods. Thus, part of the increase might also have reflected the capturing of flows that were previously unrecorded. Current transfers went temporarily into deficit in 2008, but preliminary data from 2009 indicate that they recovered.

The increase in the non-merchandise account raised net outflows to US$5.2 billion in 2008, continuing deficits in the current account. As the economy grew, however, the value of the deficits as a percentage of GDP declined on average, compared to the five years before oil exports began.

Net inflows and disbursement of foreign loans and other capital generally failed to cover the negative balance in the current account, and the overall balance of payments was regularly in deficit. The shortfall in 2011 was estimated at US$406 million.

== See also ==
- Foreign relations of Sudan
- Economy of Sudan
