= Spain–Sudan relations =

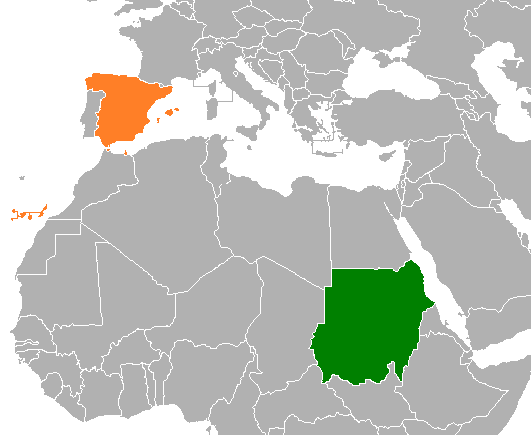

- Sudan: Spain

Spain–Sudan relations are the bilateral and diplomatic relations between these countries. Sudan has an embassy in Madrid. Spain has an embassy in Khartoum.

== Diplomatic relations ==
Spain has maintained diplomatic relations with Sudan since February 20 of 1964. Invited by King Juan Carlos I, the President of the then Democratic Republic of the Sudan, Gaafar Mohammed Nimeiri, officially visited Spain between October 10 and 14 1978.

On July 26, 2004, the former Minister of Foreign Affairs and Cooperation, Miguel Ángel Moratinos, met in Ankara with Sudan Foreign Minister Mustafa Osman Ismail to discuss the situation in the region of Dafur and the position of the respective governments.

On May 23, 2005, the Spanish Government offered, through the European Union (EU), two CASA-212 transport aircraft and five military observers to support the peace mission that the African Union had deployed in the Sudanese region of Darfur, as announced by former Defense Minister José Bono.

EOn February 24, 2006, the Council of Ministers approved the creation of a permanent diplomatic mission in Sudan, which had an embassy in Madrid since 2001, highlighting that this country, the largest in Africa, had "significant economic potential." Since 2008, the Embassy has a consular section, while the Ministry of Commerce and Interior are in Cairo.

The then Secretaries of State for Foreign Affairs, Bernardino León, and International Cooperation, Leire Pajin, visited Sudan on January 29, 30 and 31, 2007. Both Secretaries of State met in Khartoum with the Sudanese ministers for International Cooperation and Affairs Foreign, as well as with the second vice president of the Republic, who asked for "significant steps" towards the full pacification of the country. In addition, they visited the refugee camps in Darfur, where they held meetings with the peace mission, Spanish cooperators, humanitarian agencies and agencies of United Nations.

On May 25, 2007, the former Spanish Minister of Foreign Affairs and Cooperation, Miguel Ángel Moratinos, held a working meeting in Madrid with his Sudanese counterpart, Mohamed El-Wasila, to whom he expressed Spain's interest in this country, which It materialized with the reopening of the Spanish Embassy in Khartoum, the sending of an expert from the Spanish Agency for International Cooperation (AECI) and the succession of high-level visits.

The Secretary of State for Foreign Affairs, Bernardino León, attended the meeting of the so-called Expanded Contact Group on Darfur on June 25, 2007, which brought together representatives from 18 countries and half a dozen international organizations.

Minister Ghandour has not yet visited Spain, although his predecessor, Ali Karti, did them three times: October 2010 (when a bilateral Cooperation Agreement was signed), May 2013 (to participate in the I Hispanic-Cultural and Economic Forum I, organized in Casa Árabe) and April 2014 (on the occasion of the state funeral held in honor of former President Adolfo Suárez).

== See also ==
- Foreign relations of Spain
- Foreign relations of Sudan
