= Foreign relations of Sudan =

The foreign relations of Sudan are generally in line with the Muslim Arab world, but are also based on Sudan's economic ties with the People's Republic of China and Russia.

== Diplomatic relations ==
List of countries which Sudan maintains diplomatic relations with:

#	Country	Date
1	Egypt	4 January 1956
2	Russia	5 January 1956
3	Romania	17 January 1956
4	Czech Republic	19 January 1956
5	Austria	24 January 1956
6	Greece	28 January 1956
7	Belgium	30 January 1956
8	Serbia	14 February 1956
9	Netherlands	15 February 1956
10	United States	15 February 1956
11	United Kingdom	3 March 1956
12	Hungary	7 March 1956
13	Germany	12 March 1956
14	Poland	4 April 1956
15	Yemen	21 April 1956
16	France	26 April 1956
17	Iraq	3 May 1956
18	India	7 May 1956
19	Norway	31 May 1956
20	Spain	14 June 1956
21	Ethiopia	27 June 1956
22	Bulgaria	1 July 1956
23	Saudi Arabia	14 October 1956
24	Pakistan	24 October 1956
25	Italy	31 October 1956
26	Lebanon	1956
27	Syria	28 January 1957
28	Albania	February 1957
29	Indonesia	10 March 1957
30	Japan	5 May 1957
31	Afghanistan	18 May 1957
32	Turkey	25 August 1957
33	Sweden	27 October 1957
34	Denmark	8 May 1958
35	Jordan	27 October 1958
36	China	4 February 1959
37	Morocco	21 March 1959
38	Ghana	24 June 1959
39	Tunisia	29 November 1959
40	Democratic Republic of the Congo	9 August 1960
41	Nigeria	1 October 1960
42	Switzerland	27 December 1960
43	Finland	27 January 1961
44	Chad	15 March 1961
45	Canada	29 May 1961
46	Guinea	24 August 1961
47	Somalia	6 October 1961
48	Argentina	15 May 1962
49	Benin	23 July 1962
50	Cyprus	24 July 1962
51	Liberia	8 August 1962
52	Mali	19 August 1962
53	Sierra Leone	19 August 1962
54	Uganda	15 October 1962
55	Central African Republic	1962
56	Kuwait	22 January 1963
57	Cameroon	12 July 1963
58	Gabon	1963
59	Libya	1963
60	Niger	1963
61	Tanzania	1963
62	Chile	13 March 1964
63	Burkina Faso	1964
64	Senegal	1964
65	Kenya	28 January 1965
66	Algeria	22 December 1965
67	Brazil	10 October 1968
68	Sri Lanka	17 October 1968
69	Mauritania	11 June 1969
70	North Korea	21 June 1969
71	Nepal	11 July 1969
72	Vietnam	26 August 1969
73	Mongolia	7 July 1970
74	Republic of the Congo	November 1970
75	Burundi	1970
76	Malaysia	23 January 1971
—	United Arab Emirates (suspended)	December 1971
77	Iran	22 August 1972
—	Holy See	29 April 1972
78	Qatar	30 April 1972
79	Bahrain	4 December 1972
80	Bangladesh	24 September 1973
81	Malta	27 November 1973
82	Australia	8 February 1974
83	Zambia	1974
84	Ivory Coast	13 April 1975
85	Philippines	7 March 1976
86	Mozambique	17 April 1976
87	Oman	17 March 1977
88	South Korea	13 April 1977
89	Djibouti	25 January 1978
90	Cuba	20 June 1979
91	Mauritius	1979
92	Maldives	10 June 1981
93	Portugal	11 January 1982
94	Thailand	15 June 1982
95	Togo	8 July 1982
96	Mexico	19 October 1982
97	Ireland	28 March 1984
98	Luxembourg	3 May 1984
99	Panama	13 September 1988
100	Colombia	3 October 1988
—	State of Palestine	15 November 1988
101	Zimbabwe	1989
102	Namibia	7 November 1990
103	Ukraine	4 June 1992
104	Croatia	17 July 1992
105	Azerbaijan	25 July 1992
106	Armenia	8 December 1992
—	Sovereign Military Order of Malta	1992
107	Georgia	10 March 1993
108	Moldova	17 May 1993
109	Eritrea	22 May 1993
110	Slovakia	27 July 1993
111	Bosnia and Herzegovina	5 August 1993
112	Slovenia	25 August 1994
113	South Africa	10 May 1994
114	Cambodia	19 May 1994
115	North Macedonia	26 April 1996
116	Brunei	August 1998
117	Belarus	15 July 1999
118	Suriname	10 September 1999
119	Malawi	12 April 2000
120	Seychelles	21 September 2001
121	Iceland	13 June 2003
122	Singapore	8 October 2003
123	Rwanda	15 October 2003
124	Angola	23 October 2003
125	Myanmar	20 May 2004
126	Uzbekistan	6 January 2005
127	Venezuela	4 May 2005
128	Paraguay	10 May 2005
129	Tajikistan	17 September 2005
130	Jamaica	19 September 2005
131	Laos	14 October 2005
132	Montenegro	31 October 2006
133	Botswana	10 January 2007
134	Dominican Republic	24 September 2007
135	Lesotho	15 November 2007
136	Gambia	13 February 2008
137	Kazakhstan	19 June 2008
138	Cape Verde	30 May 2010
139	Fiji	18 June 2010
140	South Sudan	9 July 2011
141	Comoros	16 August 2011
142	Peru	22 July 2013
143	Monaco	10 April 2014
144	Nicaragua	27 June 2014
145	Bolivia	24 October 2014
146	Latvia	23 January 2015
147	Ecuador	13 March 2015
148	Madagascar	15 April 2015
149	Turkmenistan	17 August 2015
150	Kyrgyzstan	26 September 2015
151	Equatorial Guinea	19 December 2016
152	Liechtenstein	24 May 2017
153	Lithuania	21 June 2017
154	Estonia	25 January 2018
155	Eswatini	27 March 2018
156	São Tomé and Príncipe	20 April 2018
157	Dominica	13 August 2021
158	Saint Kitts and Nevis	24 February 2022

== Bilateral relations ==
=== Africa ===
Country	Notes
Chad	See Chad–Sudan relations On 23 December 2005 Chad, Sudan's neighbor to the west, declared a 'state of belligerency' with Sudan and accused the country of being the "common enemy of the nation (Chad)." This happened after the 18 December attack on Adré, which left about 100 people dead. A statement issued by Chadian government on 23 December, accused Sudanese militias of making daily incursions into Chad, stealing cattle, killing innocent people and burning villages on the Chadian border. The statement went on to call for Chadians to form a patriotic front against Sudan. On 11 May 2008 Sudan announced it was cutting diplomatic relations with Chad, claiming that it was helping rebels in Darfur to attack the Sudanese capital Khartoum
Egypt	See Egypt–Sudan relations Both countries established diplomatic relations on 4 January 1956 when first ambassador of Egypt to Sudan general Mahmoud Seif El-Yazal Khalifa presented his letters of credentials. Egypt and Sudan have enjoyed intimate and longstanding historical ties, seeing as they are each other's closest allies in the North African region. The two countries are connected by various cultural ties and political aspirations. In the late 1970s, Sudan showed great solidarity with Egypt in its Camp David peace initiatives with Israel. In 2008, Egyptian Prime Minister Ahmed Nazif urged the two countries to focus on two specific projects: the Gezira Scheme which aims to cultivate some two million acres (8,000 km^{2}) of land in Sudan, and a joint project to improve food security in agricultural and meat production. Sudan asserts its claim to the Hala'ib Triangle, a barren area of 20,580 km^{2} under partial Sudanese administration that is defined by an administrative boundary which supersedes the treaty boundary of 1899. Egypt's policy on Sudan is in favor of a united Sudan. As such Egypt was not directly involved in the Sudan Peace Process which was hosted in Kenya under the auspices of the Intergovernmental Authority on Development that gave the peoples of south Sudan the right to secede and form an independent state in 2011 after the long and brutal Sudanese civil war that cumulatively lasted 22 years and claimed 2 million lives.
Ethiopia	Both countries established diplomatic relations on 27 June 1956 when accredited first Ambassador of Ethiopia to Sudan Mr. Ato Mellas M. Andom. See Ethiopia–Sudan relations. As of 2011, good relations between Sudan and Ethiopia continued in spite of Sudan's improved ties with Eritrea. President al-Bashir visited Addis Ababa twice in 2001. During a visit to Khartoum in 2002, Ethiopia's prime minister, Meles Zenawi, hailed Ethiopian–Sudanese ties. The two countries agreed to cancel entry visas and fees on traded commodities, and they stepped up plans to increase trade. Ethiopia began early in 2003 to import oil from Sudan. By 2009 Sudan supplied 80 percent of Ethiopia's demand for oil. The two nations signed an agreement ending a dispute involving their 1,600-kilometer border, and landlocked Ethiopia made plans to make greater use of Port Sudan as a transshipment point. Ethiopia, Sudan, and Yemen formed a regional group early in 2003 that they said was designed to "combat terrorism" in the Horn of Africa. Bilateral relations among countries in the Horn of Africa tended to be fickle. However, Ethiopia and Sudan continued to make progress on settling border issues. The Ethiopian prime minister and Sudanese president inaugurated a major new road link between Ethiopia and Sudan at the end of 2007. There were frequent subsequent exchange visits by Ethiopian and Sudanese leaders. Ethiopia remained wary, however, of any effort by Sudan to return to a policy supporting Islamist militancy in the region. Although Ethiopia preferred a united Sudan, it shored up its relations with South Sudan on the assumption that it would opt for secession. Sudan, Ethiopia, and Eritrea were periodic recipients of refugees from the other countries, another potential cause of friction. Agreement on usage of Nile water reemerged as an important issue between Addis Ababa and Khartoum, while Asmara supported the Sudanese position as another way to irritate Ethiopia.
Kenya	See Kenya–Sudan relations.
Libya	See Libya–Sudan relations Relations between Sudan and Libya deteriorated in the early 1970s and reached a low in October 1981, when Libya began a policy of crossborder raids into western Sudan. Following a 1985 coup, Sudan resumed diplomatic relations with Libya. Libyan leader Muammar Qaddafi ended his aid to the Christian and animist, southern-based, Sudanese People's Liberation Army (SPLA) led by Garang and welcomed the incoming government of General Suwar al Dahab. In July 1985, a military protocol was signed between the two countries, and Qaddafi was the first head of state to visit the new Khartoum government. Qaddafi then strongly supported Sudanese opposition leader Sadiq al Mahdi, who became prime minister on 6 May 1986. However, Mahdi soon turned against Gaddafi by declaring Sudan a neutral state in both regional and global conflicts and ordered Libyan troops to leave the country. After Mahdi was overthrown in a 1989 coup d'état, the military government of Omar Al-Bashir resumed diplomatic relations with Libya, as part of a policy of improving relations with neighboring Arab states. In early 1990, Libya and the Sudan announced that they would seek "unity". This unity was never implemented and Sudanese forces ultimately participated in the military intervention that overthrew Qaddafi by securing Kufra.
Morocco	Sudan, under the National Islamic Font government became one of the very few states in the world that recognise Moroccan sovereignty over Western Sahara.
South Sudan	See South Sudan–Sudan relations Official diplomatic relations commenced on 9 July 2011 the day of South Sudan independence when Sudan became the first state to recognise South Sudanese independence. Although cultural and economic relations predate independence and even the civil war between the two entities.

=== Americas ===
Country	Notes
United States	See Sudan–United States relations Both countries established diplomatic relations on 15 February 1956 On 3 November 1997, the U.S. government imposed a trade embargo against Sudan and a total asset freeze against the Government of Sudan under Executive Order 13067. The U.S. believed the Government of Sudan gave support to international terrorism, destabilized neighboring governments, and permitted human rights violations, creating an unusual and extraordinary threat to the national security and foreign policy of the United States. On 3 June 2008, US - Sudan normalization talks broke down over the issue of conflicts in the oil-producing central region of Abyei. On 17 February 2015 the U.S. government issued a general license to amend US Department of Treasury's Office of Foreign Assets Control (OFAC) sanctions on Sudan. The general license authorizes the exportation and re-exportation to Sudan of "certain software, hardware and services incident to personal communications over the Internet." In mid-January 2017, the United States lifted economic and trade sanctions on Sudan due to the Sudanese government's cooperation in fighting terrorism, reducing conflict, and denying safe havens to South Sudanese rebels. On 16 March 2017, the Trump Administration resumed military relations following the exchange of military attaches. In the following months, the United States Government removed Sudan from the list of Muslim-majority countries on the American travel ban and lifted all 1997 sanctions on Sudan after the Sudanese Government severed relations with North Korea. In addition, the U.S. Central Intelligence Agency, which supported the lifting of sanctions, established an office in Khartoum. Following the 2019 Sudanese coup d'état, the new Sudanese Prime Minister Abdalla Hamdok entered into talks with US officials in September 2019, seeking the removal of Sudan from the US state sponsor of terrorism list. In December 2019, the US Secretary of State Mike Pompeo announced that the United States and Sudan would begin exchanging ambassadors after a 23-year period of no diplomatic relations. In October 2020, US President Donald Trump announced that he would remove Sudan from the US state sponsor of terrorism list in return for Sudan paying US$355 million in compensation to American victims of terrorism and their families. In addition, Sudan also established diplomatic relations with Israel with US support.

=== Asia ===
Country	Notes
China	See China–Sudan relations Both countries established diplomatic relations on 4 February 1959. China is Sudan's biggest trade partner. China imports oil, from Sudan, and Sudan imports low cost items as well as armaments from China. China and Sudan enjoy a very robust and productive relationship in the fields of diplomacy, economic trade, and political strategic. The two nations established diplomatic relations on 4 January 1959 and have since become strongly close global allies. Education also has close ties, as Sudanese students go to China to learn Chinese, and Chinese students go to Sudan to learn Arabic.
Iran	See Iran-Sudan relations Relations between Sudan and Iran have long been cordial due to their opposition to Israel and extensive trade and diplomatic services existed between the two nations. In January 2016, Sudan severed relations with Iran, choosing instead to align itself with Saudi Arabia's isolation of Tehran.
Iraq	Sudan has an embassy in Baghdad and Iraq's embassy is in Khartoum. During the war between Iraq and Iran in the 1980s, Sudan maintained a careful balancing act, calling for a cessation of hostilities but sympathizing with Iraq. Sudan on several occasions offered to mediate the conflict. By 1988, Sudan called for an end to the war on the basis of United Nations Security Council Resolution 598. Sudan supported Iraq's invasion of Kuwait in 1990, leading to a period of close relations with Baghdad. Iraq was believed to have supplied weapons to Sudan and in the mid-1990s agreed to help Sudan exploit its oil wealth. Although Sudan was trying to improve relations with the United States after the September 11, 2001, terrorist attacks, it remained critical of the subsequent American-led invasion of Iraq. Following the overthrow of the Ba'athist regime, however, Sudan's position on Iraq became more nuanced. On the one hand, it was quick to criticize the United States, which harshly condemned Sudan's record on human rights, for its double standard in dealing with prisoners in Iraq. It also advised Sudanese not to work with U.S. contractors in the country. By late 2004, however, Sudan's relations with the new Iraqi government had improved to the point that Iraq's foreign minister visited Khartoum and met with al-Bashir. Subsequently, Sudan generally avoided commenting on Iraq.
Israel	See Israel–Sudan relations When the Arab-Israeli war began in June 1967, Sudan declared war on Israel. However, in the early 1970s, Sudan gradually shifted its stance and was supportive of the Camp David Accords. In January 2016, Sudanese Foreign Minister Ibrahim Ghandour floated normalized ties with Israel provided the U.S. government lifts economic sanctions. Despite official denials from the Sudanese government, it is suspected that Israel and Sudan maintain covert relations along with other moderate Sunni states as Sudan is a member of the "Saudi coalition" and both nations are vehemently opposed to Iran. On 23 October 2020, Sudan agreed to normalize relations with Israel in return for the Trump Administration removing Sudan from the United States' list of state sponsors of terrorism, easing a barrier to economic aid and investment in Sudan.
Malaysia	See Malaysia–Sudan relations. Malaysia has an embassy in Khartoum, while Sudan has an embassy in Kuala Lumpur. Both countries are members of the Organisation of Islamic Cooperation, Sudan has brotherly relations with Malaysia. In October 2021, bilateral relations with Malaysia were adversely affected by the Sudanese transitional government's seizure of Petronas' Sudanese assets on the allegation that they had been acquired through illegal means during the rule of ousted Sudanese President Omar al-Bashir. In response, the Malaysian Government urged the Sudanese government to honour the Bilateral Investment Promotion and Protection Treaty while Petronas submitted an arbitration request at the World Bank's International Centre for Settlement of Investment Disputes (ICSID). Middle East Monitor contributor Nasim Ahmed opined that the transitional Sudanese government's actions were part of a foreign policy to move away from traditional allies like Turkey, Qatar and China and to court Western investors.
Pakistan	See Pakistan–Sudan relations. Both countries established diplomatic relations on 24 October 1956. Relations between Pakistan and Sudan have been characterised as close, warm, brotherly, and cordial. Both Pakistan and Sudan share the same religion as well as historical baggage of colonial rule. Both countries are members of the Organisation of Islamic Cooperation, the Like Minded Group, and the Group of 77 in the United Nations. Bilateral relations strengthened when Sudan declared its support for Pakistan in the Indo-Pakistani wars, and Pakistan stood by Sudan over its integrity and sovereignty, especially on its boundary disputes with both Egypt and South Sudan. Pakistan also contributed to the UN peacekeeping force in Sudan with 1,542 personnel and 92 observers during the Second Sudanese Civil War. Through various memorandums of understanding, the two cooperate in the fields of agriculture, healthcare and education. Pakistan is also supporting Sudan with higher education as more than five hundred students from Sudan study in the universities of Pakistan which is the highest number of Sudanese students to any foreign country. In the past, Pakistan has offered medical training to Sudanese without any tuition fees. Sudan donated generously in the relief efforts during earthquake in 2005 and floods in 2010 in Pakistan. In turn, Pakistan has sent aid to Sudan during drought and famine. UNMIS Pakistani contingent regularly holds free clinics in remote areas of Blue Nile State that are currently inaccessible by land. In 2009, 37th such event was held near Ad-Damazin where over 1,500 patients were treated. Pakistan and Sudan regularly engage in collaborative dialogue at OIC summits to improve political stability in the Middle East and the Islamic World. In 2014, President Mamnoon Hussain proposed a third round of Pakistan-Sudan Joint Ministerial Commission (JMC) to enhance cooperation in trade, economic and defence sectors.
Qatar	See Qatar–Sudan relations Relations between Qatar and Sudan were first established in 1972, when Qatar inaugurated its embassy in Sudan's capital, Khartoum. In turn, Sudan has an embassy in Doha, Qatar. Qatar remains one of the largest foreign investors in Sudan, and has helped broker peace agreements between the Sudanese government and rebel factions in Darfur.
Saudi Arabia	See Saudi Arabia–Sudan relations. Both countries established diplomatic relations on 14 October 1956 when Minister of the Republic of Sudan to Saudi Arabia, Sayyid Mahjoub Maccawi, presented his credentials to King Saud. Saudi Arabia had been an important source of financial support for Sudan prior to the 1990–91 Gulf War. Sudan's support for Iraq adversely affected its relations with Saudi Arabia, and al-Turabi's brand of Islamism was not in tune with Saudi Wahhabi philosophy. Riyadh suspended grants, project loans, and concessionary oil sales. This action had a devastating impact on Sudan's budget and economy. The relationship normalized by 1995 and continued to improve. The two countries signed an agreement in 2004 to set up a political coordination committee. Al-Bashir visited Saudi Arabia in May 2004, and Saudi leaders subsequently supported Sudan's handling of the crisis in Darfur. In 2005 the two countries signed two security agreements on combating crime, drug trafficking, and terrorism. Saudi Arabia also began providing assistance for development projects in South Sudan. Significant numbers of Sudanese had for many years worked in Saudi Arabia, a factor that increased the importance of the relationship.
South Korea	The requirement for all other agencies with intelligence-gathering and analysis functions in their charters to coordinate their activities with the ANSP was reaffirmed.
Syria	See Sudan–Syria relations: Both countries established diplomatic relations on 28 January 1957 when has been accredited Ambassador of Syria to Sudan (resident in Cairo) Mr. Abdel Rahman El Azm.
Turkey	See Sudan–Turkey relations: Turkey and Sudan established bilateral relations on 25 August 1957, although there has been diplomatic contact in the past as Sudan was under the Ottoman rule of Muhammad Ali Pasha.; Sudan has an embassy in Ankara.; Turkey has an embassy in Khartoum.; Trade volume between the two countries was US$434 million in 2019 (Sudanese exports/imports: 73/361 million USD).; Yunus Emre Institute has a local headquarters in Khartoum.; Although on opposing sides of the Middle East Peace Process spectrum, Turkey and Sudan have in recent years joined forces to end the ongoing conflict between the Israelis and the Palestinians. Both countries have made repeated plea talks during the offensive in Gaza during the beginning of 2009 to Palestinian officials to be of both economic and political aid to the turmoilic state.
United Arab Emirates	See Sudan–United Arab Emirates relations The Democratic Republic of Sudan was one of the first countries where the UAE established diplomatic relations, during the presidency of Jaafar Nimeiri. On 7 May 2025, Sudan severed its relations with the UAE over accusations of the latter supporting the Rapid Support Forces in the Sudanese Civil War.
Yemen	Both countries established diplomatic relations on 21 April 1956 when has been accredited Chargé d'Affaires a.i. of Legation of the Yemen to Sudan Sayed Salah Ahmed El Masri. As of 2011, relations between Yemen and Sudan were not particularly strong, but they took on added importance after Yemen, Sudan, and Ethiopia developed an alliance late in 2003. The leaders of the three countries subsequently met frequently; the focus of their concern was often Eritrea. This alliance took an interesting twist at the end of 2004, when Yemeni president Ali Abdallah Salih offered to mediate differences between Sudan and Eritrea. As Sudan–Eritrea relations improved, the tripartite alliance with Ethiopia became dormant. The heads of government of Sudan, Yemen, Ethiopia, and Somalia did meet in Addis Ababa early in 2007, where they focused on the situation in Somalia. Sudan and Yemen also signed 14 cooperative agreements in mid-2007. As of early 2011, Sudan–Yemen relations were cordial but less significant than they had been several years before.

=== Europe ===
Country	Notes
European Union	The European Union (EU) served as an important barometer of Western political views toward Sudan's policies and sometimes offset more critical American positions. The EU, for example, tended to be more understanding of the problems facing Sudan in resolving the crisis in Darfur. It also declined, unlike the United States, to call the killings in Darfur genocide. It engaged in constructive engagement with Sudan and was reluctant to impose sanctions, but it was willing to decrease or stop development aid in response to Khartoum's crackdowns and had imposed an arms embargo. The EU's principal concern in Sudan was humanitarian assistance, help with conflict resolution, and implementation of the CPA. Formerly, the EU collectively was the largest destination for Sudanese exports, mainly gold and gum arabic, but since at least 2000 Chinese and Japanese imports of petroleum from Sudan had surpassed the value of imports by the EU. Many EU countries had small numbers of military personnel assigned to UNMIS.
Austria	See Austria–Sudan relations Both countries established diplomatic relations on 24 January 1956 On 14 February 1958 has been accredited Chargé d'Affaires of Austria to Sudan Mr. Erich Hochleither.
Belarus	See Belarus–Sudan relations Belarus and Sudan have maintained good relations since several decades. Belarus exports weapons and military hardware to Sudan since 1996. In 2003, Belarus supplied Sudan with nine BMP-2 infantry fighting vehicles, 39 BRDM-2 armoured reconnaissance vehicles, 16 122 mm howitzer 2A18 (D-30) howitzer guns, 10 2S1 Gvozdika self-propelled howitzers and six BM-21 Grad multiple rocket launchers. In 2007, a Sudanese delegation attended a Belarus arms show. In 2013, Belarus exported Su-24 planes to Sudan. In 2017, Belarusian president Alexander Lukashenko visited Sudan. On this occasion, delegations signed contracts worth $50 million. In the near future Sudan plans to test a Belarusian harvester which was especially designed for the country taking into account its climate. Additionally, Belarus Energy Minister Vladimir Potupchik said Belarus is ready to take part in the construction and reconstruction of energy facilities in Sudan. Also in January 2017, Sudanese President Omar al-Bashir and his Belarusian counterpart Alexander Lukashenko signed in Khartoum a Comprehensive Friendship and Cooperation Agreement between the two countries.
Bulgaria	See Bulgaria–Sudan relations In 1967, Bulgaria sent the first Bulgarian ambassador to Khartoum. The activities of the Bulgarian embassy in Khartoum were terminated in April 1990, and later reestablished in March 2005. In 2006 the General Consulate of the Sudan, in Sofia, Bulgaria has been upgraded to the rank of embassy.
Cyprus	Both countries established diplomatic relations on 24 July 1962 and the first Sudanese Ambassador Sayed Husseini presented his credentials to President Makarios.
Denmark	See Denmark–Sudan relations Both countries established diplomatic relations on 8 May 1958 when was accredited first Ambassador of Denmark to Sudan (resident in Cairo) Mr. Eggert Holten Danish-Sudanese relations are extremely poor. On 27 February 2008, Sudan decided to boycott Danish goods after the controversial Muhammad cartoons have been reprinted by a series of newspapers in Denmark and other European countries. Sudanese president Omar al-Bashir has backed up the country and other Muslim states, requiring them to boycott Danish products just as Sudan did. He even stated that "No Danes shall ever again be able to set foot in Sudan." Due to the tensions, the two countries have closed their embassies.
France	Both countries established diplomatic relations on 26 April 1956 when has been accredited Ambassador of France to Sudan Mr. Christian Auboyneau. France has had a long history as one of Sudan's principal commercial partners. A French company was one of the prime contractors on the ill-fated Jonglei Canal. In the early 1980s, Sudan awarded a concession to the French oil company, TotalFinaElf, for development of the oil reserves in Block Five in South Sudan. Although the company stopped work there following the resumption of civil war, it retained the concession and initiated steps in 2004 to return. France also sided with the government of Sudan in 2004 when it asserted that the situation in Darfur should not be described as genocide. Chad, a former French colony and in recent years a country with which it had close relations, tended to influence France's view of the situation in Darfur. French policy on Darfur became more critical following the election in 2007 of President Nicolas Sarkozy. France hosted in June 2007 the United States, China, and some 15 other countries at a major conference intended to launch a new international effort to end the atrocities in Darfur. The government of Sudan, angry that it was not consulted, boycotted the conference. In recent years, France has shown less interest in Sudan while its policy seemed to depend on which official was speaking. France is hosting an international conference on Sudan on 15 April 2024, leading to a humanitarian and political crisis.
Russia	See Russia–Sudan relations Both countries established diplomatic relations on 5 January 1956. Russia has an embassy in Khartoum and Sudan has an embassy in Moscow. For decades, Russia and Sudan have maintained a strong economic and politically strategic partnership. Due to solidarity with both the United States and with the Soviet Union and with the allies of the two nations, Sudan declared neutrality and instead chose membership in the Non-Aligned Movement throughout the Cold War. Russo-Sudanese relations were minorly damaged when, in 1971 members of the Sudanese Communist Party attempted to assassinate then-president Gaafar Nimeiry, and Nimeiry pegged the blame on the USSR, thus enhancing Sudanese relations with the West, and were damaged again when Sudan supported the Mujahadeen in Afghanistan when the USSR invaded in 1979. Due to a common enemy, diplomatic cooperation between the two countries dramatically got back on track during the late 1990s and early 2000s, when Vladimir Putin was elected the President, and then the Prime Minister of Russia, and along with Chinese President Hu Jintao opposed UN Peacekeepers in Darfur. Russia strongly supports Sudan's territorial integrity and opposes the creation of an independent Darfurian state. Also, Russia is Sudan's strongest investment partner in Europe and political ally in Europe, and Russia has repeatedly and significantly regarded Sudan as an important global ally in the African continent. For decades there have been Sudanese collegians studying in Russian universities.
Spain	See Spain–Sudan relations Both countries established diplomatic relations on 14 June 1956 when has been accredited Envoy Extraordinary and Minister Plenipotentiary of Spain to Sudan (Resident in Cairo) Don Jose Castano y Cardona.
Sweden	Both countries established diplomatic relations on 27 October 1957 when has been accredited Envoy Extraordinary and Minister Plenipotentiary of Sweden to Sudan (Resident in Addis Ababa) Dr. Bjorn Axel Eyvind Bratt.
Switzerland	Both countries established diplomatic relations on 27 December 1960 when has been accredited Ambassador of Switzerland to Sudan (Resident in Cairo) Dr. Jean-Louis Pahud.
Ukraine	See Sudan-Ukraine relations Both countries established diplomatic relations on 4 June 1992.
United Kingdom	See Sudan–United Kingdom relations Both countries established diplomatic relations on 3 March 1956 when has been accredited Ambassador of the United Kingdom to Sudan Sir Edwin A. Chapman-Andrews. In March 2009, Sudan expelled several major foreign aid agencies including Oxfam and Save the Children from Darfur in response to the extradition request of Omar al-Bashir to answer ICC charges. President al-Bashir accused foreign aid workers of being "spies" and "thieves". Penny Lawrence, Oxfam's international director, said of the ban "It will affect more than 600,000 Sudanese people whom we provide with vital humanitarian and development aid, including clean water and sanitation on a daily basis." Gordon Brown said in response "The humanitarian agencies that are working in Sudan should be allowed to stay there and continue their work." In April 2009, Oxfam and other aid agencies appealed their ban saying that "The expulsion is already affecting the lives of hundreds of thousands of the very poorest and most vulnerable Sudanese people". Oxfam have denied working for the ICC saying that "We don't have an agreement with the ICC, we are a humanitarian organisation and we are impartial," and "We don't have anything to do with the ICC and we don't have a position on its decision."

== African regional organizations ==
Sudan is an active member of all pertinent African organizations and is a charter member of the Organization of African Unity (OAU), established in 1963 and headquartered in Addis Ababa. During most of its time as a member of the OAU, it used its membership to keep the OAU out of the civil war. Even so, in 1994, the OAU mandated that negotiations toward ending the civil war be undertaken. Sudan consistently made its presence known in the OAU and continued to do so in its successor forum, the African Union (AU), created in 2002. In contrast to its policy of keeping the OAU out of the war in the South, Sudan accepted 8,000 AU troops in troubled Darfur (see War in Darfur), concluding that it was preferable to have an AU peacekeeping mission than one from the United Nations. However, Sudan both limited the number of AU troops and confined their role to monitoring the situation rather than engaging in more proactive peacekeeping. In mid-2007, al-Bashir finally agreed to allow UN forces to join AU peacekeeping operations in Darfur. The crisis in Darfur prevented Sudan from taking its turn in 2006 to assume the chairmanship of the AU; most AU members wanted Sudan to make more progress in ending the Darfur conflict. Subsequent indictment by the International Criminal Court further complicated al-Bashir's situation, and the AU continued to pass over his name in selecting a chairman.

Sudan is a charter member of Intergovernmental Authority on Development (IGAD), established in 1996 as the successor to an earlier regional grouping. The focus of IGAD in the early 2000s was regional cooperation among its seven member states. IGAD played a critical role in ending the war between Khartoum and the Sudan People's Liberation Movement/Sudan People's Liberation Army but otherwise was not effective in mediating regional conflicts because of serious differences among its members, especially Ethiopia and Eritrea. Sudan is a member of the Common Market for Eastern and Southern Africa (COMESA) and is one of 11 COMESA nations that had joined in a free-trade area and agreed to eliminate tariffs on goods originating in member countries. Sudan is a member of the economic union led by Libya known as the Community of Sahel-Saharan States. Sudan also belongs to the African Development Bank (ADB) and receives significant assistance from that organization. As of 2011, it had been in arrears to the ADB since 1995 but had begun making payments in order to pay down the debt. Sudan is an active member of the Nile Basin Initiative, which brought the riparian states together to discuss technical and political cooperation related to Nile water issues.

== Multilateral relations ==
=== Arab and Islamic organizations ===
Sudan joined the Arab League at independence in 1956 and used the organization over the years at every possible opportunity to support its policies. Following the outbreak of conflict in Darfur in 2003 and sharp criticism of its policies by Western countries, Sudan relied on strong support from the Arab League. The Arab League opposed sanctions against Sudan, and several members provided humanitarian aid to refugees fleeing the fighting. By the end of 2004, the Arab League joined the cease-fire monitoring committee for Darfur. Al-Bashir served as the Arab League chairman in 2006. Sudan joined the Organization of Islamic Cooperation (OIC) in 1969. It sought support in the organization for activities such as the reconstruction of war-ravaged South Sudan. Like the Arab League, the OIC supported Khartoum's actions in Darfur. Sudan is also a member of a number of other Arab or Islamic regional organizations, including the Arab Bank for Economic Development in Africa, the Arab Monetary Fund, and the Islamic Development Bank.

=== United Nations ===
Sudan joined the United Nations in 1956, and its various institutions began almost immediately to assist Sudan. UN refugee assistance during Sudan's first civil war began in the early 1960s. In 1965 one of the South Sudanese exile organizations unsuccessfully demanded the intervention of the United Nations to end atrocities. Sudan experienced frequent criticism in UN bodies throughout the first civil war that ended in 1972. Khartoum showed great skill in using the United Nations in pursuit of its own interests. One example occurred in 1976, when Sudan accused Libya at the United Nations of supporting a failed coup attempt.

Because the country was engaged continuously in a civil war in the South until 2005 except for the period 1972–83, Sudan was the subject of many UN resolutions. The United Nations Children's Fund (UNICEF) and the World Food Programme created Operation Lifeline Sudan in 1989 to deal with the problems created in the South by drought and the civil war. The United Nations High Commissioner for Human Rights issued a series of reports critical of the human-rights situation in Sudan. The Security Council imposed sanctions on Sudan in May 1996 after Khartoum refused to extradite three Egyptians to Ethiopia for their alleged involvement in the attempted assassination of President Mubarak in Addis Ababa in 1995. The mild sanctions reduced the number and level of Sudanese diplomats stationed abroad. The Security Council, with the United States abstaining, removed these sanctions in August 2001. In 2005, the UN Security Council agreed to a travel ban and asset freeze on persons suspected of committing human-rights abuses in Darfur and in 2006 imposed sanctions against four Sudanese involved in Darfur atrocities. Much to the consternation of the United States, Sudan in 2004 filled an African regional seat on the United Nations Human Rights Commission. A UN commission investigating atrocities in Darfur concluded in 2005 that genocide had not occurred. It did find, however, that Khartoum and government-sponsored militias engaged in "widespread and systematic" abuse that might constitute crimes against humanity. By late 2010, the UN had two of its largest peacekeeping operations—UNMIS and UNAMID—in Sudan.

== See also ==
- List of diplomatic missions in Sudan
- List of diplomatic missions of Sudan
- Foreign trade of Sudan
