= Gerald Loeb Award winners for Television =

American journalism award

The Gerald Loeb Award is given annually for multiple categories of business reporting. The first television awards were given for "Network and Large-Market Television" (1997, 1999–2000), "Other TV Markets" (1997), and "Television" (2001–2002). Subsequent television awards were given in 2003–2011 and broken down into several different categories: "Television Long Form" (2003–2004), "Television Short Form" (2003–2004), "Television Deadline" (2005–2006), "Television Enterprise" (2006–2011), "Television Daily" (2007–2008), "Television Breaking News" (2009–2010).

== Gerald Loeb Award winners for Network and Large-Market Television (1997, 1999–2000) ==
- 1997: "On Dangerous Ground" by Byron Harris, WFAA-TV
- 1999: "Investigative Piece on the International Pharmaceutical Industry" by Mike Wallace and Walt Bogdanich, CBS News 60 Minutes
- 2000: "Sweepstakes Series" by Brian Gaffney, Lea Thompson, Neal Shapiro and John Reiss, Dateline NBC

Their series provided an in-depth look at the practices of the sweepstakes industry.

== Gerald Loeb Award winners for Other TV Markets (1997) ==
- 1997: "My First House" by Antonio Valverde, KMEX-TV

== Gerald Loeb Award winners for Television (2000–2002) ==
- 2001: "The Paper Chase" by Lynne Dale and John Larson Dateline NBC
- 2002: "The Money Trail" by Allan Dodds Frank and Lisa Slow, Cable News Network/CNNfn

Air Dates of Reports:
1. September 21, 2001
2. November 25, 2001
3. October 3, 2001
4. October 11, 2001
5. October 17, 2001
6. October 31, 2001
7. November 16, 2001

== Gerald Loeb Award winners for Television Long Form (2003–2004) ==
- 2003: "La Oroya, City of Lead" by Craig Cheatham, Mark Hadler and Andrea Torrence, KMOV-TV

The depth and complexity of their investigation of a local company far exceeded the expectations for a local television station.

- 2004: "Imported from India" by Rome Hartman and Lesley Stahl, CBS News 60 Minutes

== Gerald Loeb Award winners for Television Short Form (2003–2004) ==
- 2003: "Enron Investigation" by Brian Ross, Rhonda Schwartz, Chris Vlasto, Jill Rackmill, David Scott, Gerilyn Curtin and Simon Surowicz, ABC News

Their investigation exposed questionable actions by Enron and led the way for investigations by other news organizations.

Stories in Series:
1. World News Tonight, January 21, 2002
2. World News Tonight, January 29, 2002
3. World News Tonight, January 31, 2002
4. World News Tonight, February 4, 2002
5. World News Tonight, February 6, 2002
6. World News Tonight, February 8, 2002
7. World News Tonight, February 11, 2002
8. World News Tonight, February 13, 2002

- 2004: "The Jobless Recovery" by Doug Adams, Christiana Arvelis, Donna Bass, Steve Capus, Joo Lee, Karen Nye, Albert Oetgen, Felicia Patinkin, Charles Schaeffer, Nikki Stamos and Anne Thompson, NBC Nightly News

== Gerald Loeb Award winners for Television Deadline (2005–2006) ==
- 2005: "Money for Nothing?" by Chris Cuomo, Shelley Ross, Bob Lange, Thomas Berman and Jack Pyle, ABC News: Primetime
- 2006: "The Katrina Effect" by Anne Thompson, Doug Adams, Liz Brown, Carl Sears, Kelly Venardos, Joo Lee, Rick Brown, Katie Ernst, Rich Dubroff, Doug Stoddart, Chuck Schaeffer, Mario García, Meaghan Rady, Genevieve Michel-Bryan, Jill Silverstri, Chris Scholl, Sharon Hoffman, Albert Oetgen and John Reiss, NBC Nightly News

== Gerald Loeb Award winners for Television Enterprise (2006–2011) ==
- 2006: "China Rising" by Paul Solman, Lee Koromvokis, Jeffrey Klein, Jacob Klein and Joanne Elgart Jennings, The NewsHour with Jim Lehrer
- 2007: "The Mother of All Heists" by Jeff Fager, Steve Kroft, Andy Court, Keith Sharman, Patti Hassler and Daniel J. Glucksman, CBS News 60 Minutes
- 2008: "Money for Nothing" by Byron Harris, Mark Smith and Kraig Kirchem, WFAA-TV
- 2009: "The Wasteland" by Scott Pelley, Solly Granatstein and Nicole Young, CBS News 60 Minutes
- 2010: "House of Cards" by David Faber, Mitch Weitzner, James Jacoby, Jill Landes, Patrick Ahearn, James Segelstein and Lisa Orlando, CNBC
- 2011: "Remington Under Fire: A CNBC Investigation" by Mitch Weitzner, Scott Cohn, Jeff Pohlman, Emily Bodenberg, Steven Banton and Gary Vandenbergh, CNBC

== Gerald Loeb Award winners for Television Daily (2007–2008) ==
- 2007: "Trophy" by Jim Popkin, Lisa Myers and Adam Ciralsky, NBC News
- 2008: "India's Promise" by Steve Washington, Darren Gersh, Dana Greenspon and Sanjay Jha, PBS Nightly Business Report

== Gerald Loeb Award winners for Television Breaking News (2009-2010) ==
- 2009: "Economic Crisis: House of Cards" by Steve Kroft, Jennifer MacDonald and L. Franklin Devine, CBS News 60 Minutes
- 2010: "The Madoff Scandal" by Scott Cohn, Mary Thompson, Courtney Ford, Wally Griffith and Molly Mazilu, CNBC
