= The New Journal =

Magazine at Yale University

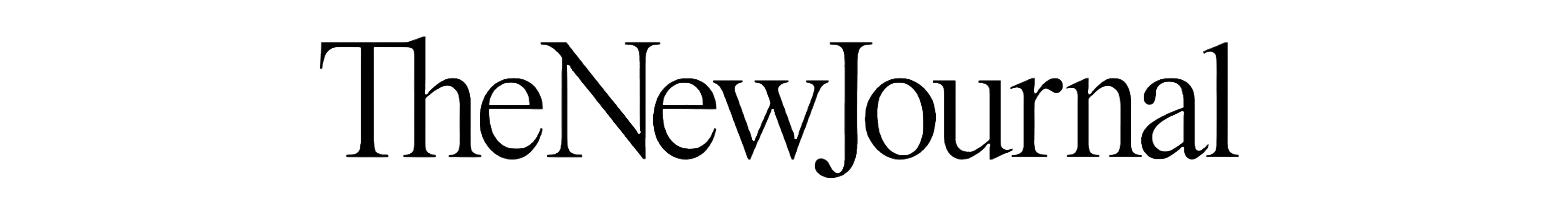

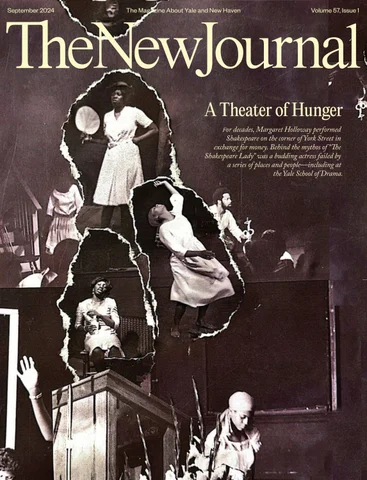
- Cover of The New Journal, September Issue, 2024
- Editors-in-Chief: Kelly Kong and Adele Haeg
- Categories: Student publication
- Frequency: Five per year
- Founder: Daniel Yergin and Peter Yeager
- Founded: 1967
- Company: The New Journal at Yale, Inc.
- Country: United States
- Based in: New Haven, Connecticut
- Language: English
- Website: www.thenewjournalatyale.com
- ISSN: 0028-6001

The New Journal is a magazine at Yale University that publishes creative nonfiction about Yale and New Haven. Inspired by New Journalism writers like Tom Wolfe and Gay Talese, the student-run publication was established by Daniel Yergin and Peter Yeager in 1967 to publish investigative pieces and in-depth interviews.

The New Journal publishes five issues per year. The magazine is distributed free of charge at Yale and in New Haven and was among the first university publications not to charge a subscription fee.

== Notable alumni ==
- Anne Applebaum, Pulitzer Prize winner for Gulag: A History, staff writer for The Atlantic
- James Bennet, former editor-in-chief of The Atlantic
- Emily Bazelon, staff writer for The New York Times Magazine, former senior editor for Slate, and senior research fellow at Yale Law School
- Richard Bradley, editor of Worth magazine
- Jay Carney, White House press secretary under Barack Obama
- Richard Conniff, writer of books, articles, and television screenplays about nature; winner of the 1997 National Magazine Award and a 2007 Guggenheim Fellowship
- Roger Cohn, former editor-in-chief of Mother Jones
- Elisha Cooper, American writer and children's book author
- Andy Court, producer, 60 Minutes
- Cassie da Costa, staff writer at Vanity Fair
- David Dunlap, reporter for The New York Times
- Dana Goodyear, staff writer at The New Yorker and co-founder of Figment
- Paul Goldberger, Pulitzer Prize-winning architectural critic and Contributing Editor for Vanity Fair
- Darren Gersh, Washington, D.C. bureau chief for Nightly Business Report
- Charlotte Howard, New York Bureau Chief and Energy and Commodities Editor for The Economist
- Tom Isler, documentary filmmaker
- Anya Kamenetz, writer, Fast Company; author, DIY U and Generation Debt
- Ellen Katz, law professor at the University of Michigan Law School
- Stuart Klawans, film critic for The Nation
- Brendan Koerner, contributing editor at Wired magazine
- Elizabeth Kolbert, Pulitzer Prize winner for The Sixth Extinction: An Unnatural History, staff writer at The New Yorker
- Lawrence Lasker, screenwriter and producer, nominated for an Academy Award in 1983 for WarGames
- Sarah Laskow, senior editor at The Atlantic
- Samantha Power, Pulitzer Prize winner for A Problem from Hell: America and the Age of Genocide, 28th United States Ambassador to the United Nations
- Motoko Rich, Rome Bureau Chief for The New York Times
- Sanjena Sathian, novelist; author, Gold Diggers
- Hampton Sides, journalist and historian; editor-at-large of Outside magazine; author, Hellhound on His Trail, Ghost Soldiers, Blood and Thunder
- Gabriel Snyder, former editor-in-chief of The New Republic
- John Swansburg, managing editor at The Atlantic
- Jessica Winter, staff writer at The New Yorker
- Ben Smith, media columnist at The New York Times, founding editor-in-chief of BuzzFeed News
