= Sue Herera =

American journalist and television anchor

- Born: Susan McMahon; November 15, 1957 (age 68); Spokane, Washington, U.S.
- Education: California State University, Northridge (B.A., Journalism, 1980)
- Occupation: Financial journalist
- Known for: Anchor of Nightly Business Report (2015-2019)
- Spouse: Daniel Herera (m. 1984)
- Children: 3
- Website: www.cnbc.com/sue-herera/

Sue Herera (née Susan McMahon, born November 15, 1957) is an American retired journalist and business news television anchor.

== Early life and education ==
Herera was born in Spokane, Washington. She grew up in Brentwood, California, where her father was a shoe wholesaler and her mother was a housewife. In 1980, Herera earned a Bachelor of Arts degree in journalism from California State University, Northridge (CSUN).

== Career ==
After graduating from CSUN, she was an intern at CBS-owned KNXT-TV in Los Angeles (now KCBS-TV). Then, in 1981, she was hired by Financial News Network (FNN), a cable TV station that had just launched that year, as an associate producer and writer covering the futures markets. Herera credits this role at FNN with teaching her how the markets work. She soon began anchoring at the station.

She has described cold-calling Michael Eskridge, the head of NBC's new cable channel CNBC, around 1988 and asking him for a job interview. Herera was among CNBC's founding members when it launched in 1989; it would purchase the above-mentioned FNN in 1991. Since then, she has anchored and co-anchored CNBC shows Market Wrap, Business Tonight, The Edge, The Money Wheel, Business Center, and Power Lunch.

In 2015, Herera became the anchor for the Nightly Business Report TV show and was joined in 2018 by co-anchor Bill Griffeth, who had previously worked with her on Power Lunch. The Nightly Business Report show made its final broadcast in December 2019. From 2019 until February 2021, she read one-minute news recaps at the top and bottom of the hour. She retired from day-to-day broadcasting in February 2021.

Herera featured 14 successful women investment professionals for her book Women of the Street: Making It on Wall Street — The World's Toughest Business, published by Wiley in 1997.

CSUN named Herera a 2003 honoree in the university's Distinguished Alumni Awards Program for her outstanding achievements. In January 2019, Herera marked 30 years with CNBC.

== See also ==
- New Yorkers in journalism

| Preceded by Susie Gharib | Host of Nightly Business Report; 2015–2019; With: Tyler Mathisen (2015–2018); Bill Griffeth (2018–2019) | Succeeded by Production ended |
