= Bill Brown (sportscaster) =

American baseball announcer (born 1947)

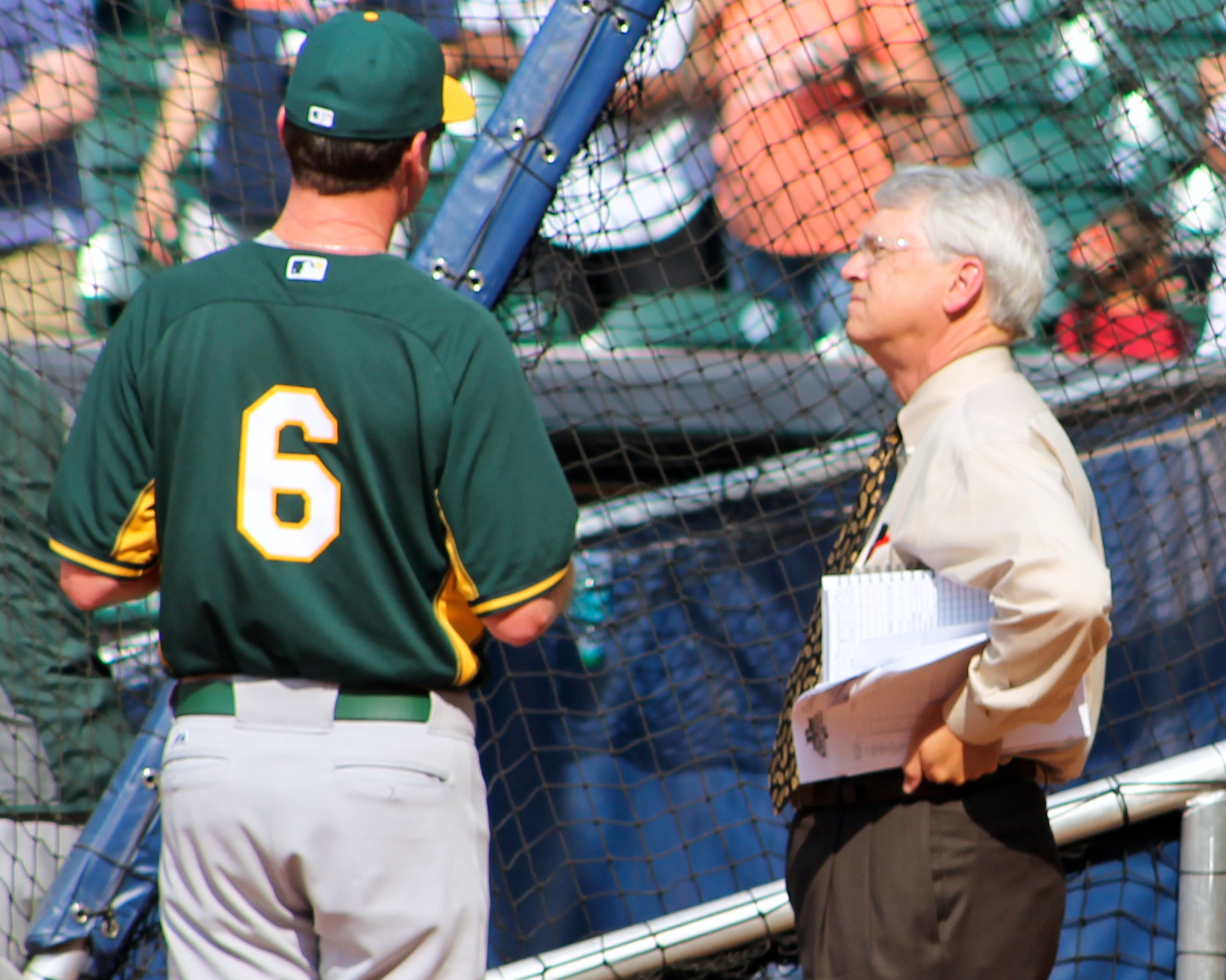
- Brown (right) in April 2014
- Born: September 20, 1947 (age 78); Sedalia, Missouri, U.S.
- Other name: Brownie
- Occupation: Former sportscaster for Houston Astros
- Spouse: Dianne
- Children: 1

Bill Brown (born September 20, 1947) is an American former sportscaster. After spending several years calling play-by-play on Cincinnati Reds broadcasts, Brown worked for the Houston Astros from 1987 to 2016.

== Biography ==
Brown did play-by-play for the Cincinnati Stingers Television Network for the 1975-76 season and the Cincinnati Reds Television Network from 1976 to 1982. He worked four years with Ken Coleman and another four years with Ray Lane. Brown also called Xavier Musketeers and Cincinnati Bearcats basketball and Cincinnati Swords hockey early in his career, and was a senior producer and anchor of the Financial News Network's SCORE programing and sports director of the Sports Time Cable Network. He was sports director of Home Sports Entertainment in Pittsburgh.

Brown became an announcer with the Houston Astros in 1987. With the Astros, Brown was often called "Brownie" by his play-by-play partner Alan Ashby. He often played the straight man to former partner Jim Deshaies' humorous asides. Brown retired on September 28, 2016, after the final Astros home game of the 2016 season and was succeeded by Todd Kalas, He cited his reason to retire due to feeling that his performance on the air was slipping. However, he returned to call games for the Astros from May 1–4, 2017 due to the death of Kalas's mother, and Brown would work on a part time basis in community outreach with the Astros; Brown went into the announcing booth again in 2018 to fill in as the radio play-by-play for a three game series in june in place of Steve Sparks.

He lives in Houston with his wife, Dianne. They have a daughter and three grandchildren. He was a member of Phi Kappa Psi fraternity at the University of Missouri (Columbia, Missouri).

Brown was inducted into the Texas Baseball Hall of Fame on November 12. 2004. In 2011 Brown was inducted into the Media Wall of Honor at Minute Maid Park. The Texas Italian-American Sports Foundation presented him with a community service award. The Houston baseball media presented him with the Fred Hartman Award for Long and Meritorious service in 2012. In 2013 Brown was voted Texas Sportscaster of the Year by the Texas voters in the National Sportscasters and Sportswriters Association (now the National Sports Media Association) in Salisbury, N.C.

On January 21, 2023, the Astros announced that Brown was to be inducted into the Houston Astros Hall of Fame as part of the class of 2023 with former second baseman Bill Doran. An induction ceremony was held at Minute Maid Park prior to the start a contest versus the Los Angeles Angels on August 12, 2023.

== Notable Calls ==
June 28, 2007 – Brown was the play-by-play announcer for Craig Biggio's 3000th hit game in the 2007 Houston Astros season for the now defunct Fox Sports Houston, where Craig Biggio got his 3,000th hit in the bottom of the 7th inning to tie the game at four.

LINE DRIVE, RIGHT CENTER FIELD! THAT'S NUMBER 3000! AND HE DRIVES IN A RUN, AND HE'S GOING FOR SECOND, TAVERAS WITH THE THROW... he's out, but that's 3,000 hits for Craig Biggio. It ties the ballgame. He arrived 20 years from Smithtown, New York with Texas-sized dreams, and now as he's mobbed by his teammates, those dreams have become reality.

June 28, 2007– Brown also called Carlos Lee's game-winning grand slam in the bottom of the 11th inning. Brown's call of the home run:

Fly ball, Left Field! THIS COULD BE A GAME-WINNING GRAND SLAM! AND CARLOS LEE HAS... DONE IT!!! AN UNBELIEVABLE NIGHT IN HOUSTON, TEXAS! Carlos Lee with his second walk-off homer of the season.

. August 21, 2015– Brown called Mike Fiers' no hitter on August 21, 2015.

133 pitches, well beyond the point most starting pitchers are still in the game these days. AND HE GOT IT!! A NO-HITTER FOR MIKE FIERS!!!

May 2, 2017– Brown replaced current Astros play-by-play announcer Todd Kalas due to Kalas' mother dying. He was calling the Astros-Rangers game when Marwin Gonzalez hit a go-ahead grand slam off Keone Kela.

Deep drive, Right Field! This is gonna soar but will it be fair?!! MARWIN GONZALEZ HAS HIT A GRAND SLAM!!!! And the late inning magic continues at Minute Maid Park, a grand slam by Marwin Gonzalez. And with two outs, on a 2-1 pitch here in the bottom of the 8th inning, the Astros have taken their first lead of the game.
