= CNBC on Assignment =

CNBC on Assignment is a series of business reports running on the TV channel CNBC started in 2005.

The program's reports have included:

- The Age of Wal-Mart, a report by David Faber about Wal-Mart
- The eBay Effect, another report by David Faber about eBay
- NASCAR Gold with Dylan Ratigan
- God and Money, about religion and money in the U.S., with Tyler Mathisen
- The Kingdom Built on Oil, a report done by Melissa Francis about Saudi Arabia and oil production
- Rebellion in the Magic Kingdom, report about Disney's corporate governance conflicts, with Maria Bartiromo
- Las Vegas, Inc with Dylan Ratigan about the businesses in and around the casinos of Las Vegas, Nevada

The music for CNBC on Assignment was made by 615 Music, a company from Nashville, Tennessee, that also made the music for the business day programs on CNBC.
