= Worldnet =

Worldnet may refer to:

- AT&T Worldnet: a dial-up Internet access service.
- WORLDNET Television and Film Service: a former American state-funded cable and satellite television channel.
