= Allan Chernoff =

American journalist

Allan Chernoff is a writer and owner of Chernoff Communications, a strategic media communications firm. He is the author with Rena Margulies Chernoff of The Tailors of Tomaszow, a communal memoir and history of Holocaust survivors from Tomaszow-Mazowiecki, Poland. He was CNN's senior correspondent in New York for 11 years specializing in finance and business. Before joining CNN, Chernoff was senior correspondent at CNBC. Chernoff was also a senior partner with Fleishman-Hillard.

== Early life and education ==
Chernoff's mother, Rena (née Margulies) is a survivor of the Holocaust. Chernoff is a graduate of Brown University. While working at CNN, he earned an Executive Certificate in Financial Planning from Fordham University.

== Career ==
Chernoff was a founding journalist of Financial News Network (FNN), television's first network devoted to finance and business and was FNN's first New York Correspondent. While at FNN he was the first journalist to report live from the floor of the New York Stock Exchange.

Prior to joining CNN in 2000, he reported for CNBC and NBC programs, including the weekend editions of NBC Nightly News and Today, as well as for MSNBC, WNBC, WCAU, WMGM-TV and other NBC affiliates. He reported on international, political and economic affairs from Japan, Russia, Germany, Israel, Mexico and Canada. At CNBC, Chernoff created and presented the network's "Managing Your Money" segments and later rose to become CNBC's first Senior Correspondent.

As a reporter on CNN, he appeared on CNN, CNN International, HLN and CNN Radio and wrote for CNNmoney.com and CNN.com. Chernoff also reported and anchored for Time Warner's now-defunct CNNfn. He frequently served as CNN's economic and personal finance analyst. For more than two decades, Chernoff has helped viewers, listeners and readers understand economic swings, the ups and downs of the stock, bond and commodity markets and how to best manage their personal finances. Prior to the recent financial crisis, Chernoff reported extensively on the looming mortgage meltdown, the implications it could have, and how homeowners could best brace themselves.

Among his many CNN exclusives, Chernoff exposed serious safety gaps in the airline industry; fraud in the healthcare system; and ecological damage caused by ethanol production. As part of his extensive coverage of the oil spill in the Gulf of Mexico Deepwater Horizon Oil Spill, he revealed the fact that oil rig blowout preventers, used as a fail-safe by the oil drilling industry, had a history of failure before the BP disaster.

Chernoff was the first to report on the legal battle between insurance companies and victims of Hurricane Katrina who lost their homes. He broke news of the insider trading guilty plea of former ImClone CEO Sam Waksal; SEC fraud charges against WorldCom; the plan to dissolve accounting firm Arthur Andersen; Wall Street analyst Jack Grubman's conflict of interest settlement; the suicide of former Enron executive Cliff Baxter; and details of the global settlement between tobacco companies and the states. He has covered every major business scandal since the 1980s, from Milken to Martha to Madoff.

Among his honors, Chernoff is a six-time winner of best reporting awards from the Society of Professional Journalists' New York chapter, Deadline Club. He has won two National Headliner Awards; two New York Festival Awards; and a Prism Award. Chernoff's reporting contributed to a CNN DuPont Award and his coverage of the Gulf oil spill, Hurricane Katrina and analysis of economic issues in the 2008 presidential campaign were each part of CNN's Peabody Award-winning efforts. His work has also been honored by the Sidney Hillman Foundation and the University of Maryland.

He has written on business, foreign affairs, travel and sports for The New York Times, The Wall Street Journal, Financial Times, Los Angeles Times, as well as other publications.

He sits on the board of the Deadline Club, is a career advisor for Brown University, and was an interviewer for the Survivors of the Shoah Visual History Project and a board member and Secretary of the New York Financial Writers Association.

== Personal life ==
He is married to Robin Chernoff; they have twin daughters.
