= Paul Kangas =

American broadcast journalist (1937–2017)

- Born: Paul Henry Kangas; April 14, 1937; Houghton, Michigan, U.S.
- Died: February 28, 2017 (aged 79); Miami, Florida, U.S.
- Education: University of Michigan
- Occupation: Business broadcaster
- Notable credit: Co-anchor of Nightly Business Report
- Spouse: Peni Angeloff (d. 2010)

Paul Henry Kangas (April 14, 1937 – February 28, 2017) was the Miami-based co-anchor of the PBS television program Nightly Business Report, a role he held from 1979, when the show was a local PBS program in Miami, through December 31, 2009. He was known for signing off each NBR broadcast with "I'm Paul Kangas, wishing all of you the best of good buys" (a pun on "the best of goodbyes").

== Career ==
After graduating from the University of Michigan, Kangas entered the United States Coast Guard in the early 1960s and served aboard the USCG Cutter Mackinaw. Later, he served as aide to the admiral in command of the 9th Coast Guard District in Cleveland, Ohio. Kangas completed his Coast Guard service in 1963 as a Lieutenant (junior grade).

Kangas earned his broker's license after studying at the New York University Stern School of Business. While a stock broker, Kangas began his career as a broadcaster at WINZ, a CBS Radio affiliate in Miami owned by his biggest client.

Kangas joined Nightly Business Report in 1979; in 2003, his "Stocks in the News" segment earned a Financial Writers and Editors Award from the Medill School of Journalism at Northwestern University. He retired as co-anchor of the Nightly Business Report at the end of 2009.

== Personal life and death ==
Kangas was of Finnish descent, and an amateur radio operator with the callsign W4LAA. He died on February 28, 2017, in Miami, Florida, from complications of Parkinson's disease and prostate cancer, aged 79.

== Awards and honors ==
- In 2005, Kangas won a Suncoast Chapter Silver Circle Award.
- The National Academy of Television Arts and Sciences presented the 2009 Lifetime Achievement Award in Business & Financial Reporting to Paul Kangas and Linda O'Bryon, the latter the founder of NBR and now chief content officer of Northern California Public Broadcasting.

Preceded by Position created	Host of Nightly Business Report in Miami; 1979–2009; With: Susie Gharib (1998–2014) in New York	Succeeded by Tom Hudson
