= Score (television) =

Former American TV sports channel

Score/FNN Sports
- Network: Financial News Network
- Launched: April 1, 1985
- Closed: May 19, 1991
- Country of origin: United States
- Key people: Arnie Rosenthal, executive vice president and general manager
- Format: Sports television
- Running time: Weekdays 6:00 p.m. to 1:00 a.m. (1985–1988); Weekends 12:00 p.m. to 1:00 a.m. (1988–1991)
- Original language: English

Score was the weekend sports service of the Financial News Network which aired sports-themed programming starting in 1985. It was renamed FNN Sports in 1989 after FNN decided to go with a 24-hour feed on weekdays a year earlier. Score was closed when CNBC bought out FNN in 1991.

Score used a sports ticker or crawl to update scores at the bottom of the screen. As it was partly owned by FNN, a stock ticker was often shown across the bottom of the screen. SCORE provided scores and highlight updates every half-hour.

== History ==
The Financial News Network (FNN) broadcast for 13 hours a day until April 1, 1985, when it became a 24-hour operation following the demise of Sports Time, a premium regional sports network owned by Anheuser-Busch which broadcast mostly in Midwestern states. Anheuser-Busch owned the satellite transponder which FNN leased for its broadcasts. To fill the expanded programming day, FNN turned to rebroadcasts of its business programming and sports, including a block named Score which originally aired from 10 p.m. to 3 a.m. Eastern as well as three hours from program producer ProServ Television. The interim programming was replaced in May with new live and studio programming. A-B contributed to Score sets used on Sports Time programming and four on-air personalities that had hosted its studio programming: Bill Brown, Byron Day, John Loesing and Todd Donoho.

Score ceased broadcasting on weekdays in September 1988 to allow FNN to broadcast during prime time; it gained some weekend hours that had been occupied by home shopping service Telshop. In May 1989, FNN announced it would relaunch Score as a sports news service broadcasting on weekends from 2 p.m. to 6 a.m. with a news wheel of scores and highlights. By this time, Score was provided to 20 million cable subscribers while FNN's business programming was available to 32 million subscribers. When the revamp took effect on September 9, the name was changed to FNN: Sports to reflect a decreased emphasis on sports play-by-play.

When CNBC acquired FNN in 1991, FNN: Sports was dropped in favor of the weekend talk programming on CNBC. FNN: Sports had been turning a profit, unlike its parent.

== Programming ==
Score had several shows that were televised versions of what sports talk radio is today. Score featured some professional sporting events, live call-in shows, and sports news shows. Live sporting events included professional wrestling, MISL soccer, college basketball, the CFL and boxing. It also broadcast a couple NASCAR races in 1988 that were originally slated for Special Events Television Network before it folded.

It also showed at least two games of the 1986 National Invitation Tournament.

=== Call-in shows, including Time Out for Trivia ===
Its most popular show was Time Out for Trivia, hosted by Todd Donoho and produced by Eric Corwin. Time Out For Trivia was the first national live interactive game show in which viewers phoned in, and if they correctly answered a question, they would win a prize. One of the most popular prizes on the show was the Dirt Devil vacuum cleaner which often included a funny sound effect like an "ooooh" or an "oooooh.... aaaaaah." Humor was almost always an ingredient, particularly in the multiple-choice questions, which often included an obvious nonsports figure as one of the possible answers.

Time Out For Trivia became a cult hit on cable TV, receiving many glowing reviews in newspapers and magazines. Gary Nuhn, a columnist for the Dayton Daily News, has called TOFT "cable TV at its best," and Wendell Barnhouse, radio/TV columnist for the Fort Worth Star-Telegram, says it is "one of life's joys." Sports Illustrated did a feature about TOFT in its famous swimsuit issue. Donoho and Corwin did over 1,000 shows together, including a 1,000th show "special edition", a one-hour program which featured highlights from the first 999 shows. Donoho and Corwin worked together on TOFT and other shows at FNN/SCORE from 1985 through 1989 before joining the sports department at KABC-TV in Los Angeles. Much of this show was incorporated into a show on KABC called Monday Night Live, which aired after Monday Night Football from 1990 to 1999, when Donoho's contract was not renewed by KABC. The show was then renamed Sports Zone with host Rob Fukuzaki and it remained an MNF postgame show until the package left ABC after the 2005 season. Sports Zone remains on KABC, following many events televised by the network.

When the channel was relaunched as FNN: Sports, Time Out for Trivia received a new host, George Siegal.

Other call-in shows included The Fan Speaks Out, The Final Score, and The Sports Collector.

=== News programs ===
News shows featured included Tennis Talk, a baseball program called The Hot Stove League, and a sports wagering program with Wayne Root. Jimmy "The Greek" Snyder hosted a football program, Who Beat the Spread. Other hosts included Bill Brown, Byron Day, John Loesing, Hugh Malay, Dan Walker, George Siegal, and Fred Wallin.

=== Professional wrestling ===
The professional wrestling programming exposed fans throughout the country to regional territory wrestling promotions. These territories included the Mid-Atlantic with Ric Flair and Chief Wahoo McDaniel, Memphis with Jerry 'the King' Lawler, Texas with the Von Erichs and the Maivia family's Hawaii promotion with Rocky Johnson, King Curtis, Don Muraco, Lars Anderson, Superfly Snuka, Bruiser Brody and many Japanese wrestlers. It also prominently featured wrestling from the Continental Wrestling Federation including matches featuring Eddie Gilbert, Tom Prichard, and The Dirty White Boy.
