= Dana Goodyear bibliography =

List of the published work of Dana Goodyear, American journalist and poet.

== Non-fiction ==
- Goodyear, Dana (October 9, 2000). "A first kill". Postcard from the Veldt. The New Yorker. 76 (30): 32.
- — (April 24, 2006). "What happened at Alder Creek?". The New Yorker.
- — (October 26, 2009). "Man of extremes". The New Yorker.
- — (November 9, 2009). "The scavenger". The New Yorker.
- — (March 21, 2011). "Hollywood Shadows". The New Yorker.
- — (January 30, 2012). "Letter from Tijuana: The Missionary". The New Yorker. 87 (46): 50–59.
- — (December 3, 2012). "Annals of Gastronomy: Toques from Underground". The New Yorker. 88 (38): 46–52.
- — (2013). Anything that moves : renegade chefs, fearless eaters, and the making of a new American food culture.
- — (July 22, 2013). "The Talk of the Town: Encore: Songs of Commerce". The New Yorker. 89 (21): 22–23.
- — (November 4, 2013). "Beastly appetites : the animals we love too much to eat". A Reporter at Large. The New Yorker. 89 (35): 72–77, 79–81.
- — (March 3, 2014). "Contender". The Talk of the Town. The Pictures. The New Yorker. 90 (2): 26–27.
- — (March 17, 2014). "Long story short : Lydia Davis's radical fiction". Life and Letters. The New Yorker. 90 (4): 24–30.
- — (September 29, 2014). "The Dry Land". The New Yorker.
- — (May 4, 2015). "The dying sea : what will California sacrifice to survive the drought?". Letter from the Imperial Valley. The New Yorker. 91 (11): 22–27. The Salton Sea.
- — (June 29, 2015). "Life with Father". The Talk of the Town. The Pictures. The New Yorker. 91 (18): 20–21.
- — (February 29, 2016). "The stress test : rivalries, intrigue, and fraud in the world of stem-cell research". Annals of Science. The New Yorker. 92 (3): 46–57.
- — (August 21, 2017). "Strawberry valley : how Driscoll's became the Apple of the berry business". Annals of Agriculture. The New Yorker. 93 (24): 30–35.
- — (March 1, 2021). "Viewfinder". The Talk of the Town. The Pictures. The New Yorker. 97 (2): 17.
- — (September 6, 2021). "Grub : eating bugs to save the planet". Dept. of Gastronomy. August 15 & 22, 2011. The New Yorker. 97 (27): 32–34, 36–38, 40–41.
- — (February 13–20, 2023). "Prayers for Putin". The Talk of the Town. Los Angeles Postcard. The New Yorker. 99 (1): 14–15.

== Poetry ==
Collections

- Goodyear, Dana (2005). Honey and junk.
- — (2013). The oracle of Hollywood Boulevard : poems.

List of poems

Title	Year	First published	Reprinted/collected
Dormant	2010	Dana Goodyear (August 9, 2010) "Dormant", The New Yorker	
Los Angeles, in Earthquake Light	2011	Dana Goodyear (April 21, 2011) "Los Angeles, in Earthquake Light", The Daily Beast	
