= Sports Time =

Defunct American regional sports network

- Country: United States
- Broadcast area: Midwestern United States
- Headquarters: St. Louis, Cincinnati

Programming
- Language: American English

Ownership
- Owner: Anheuser-Busch; Multimedia Inc. Tele-Communications Inc.

History
- Launched: April 2, 1984; 42 years ago
- Closed: March 31, 1985; 41 years ago
- Replaced by: FNN-SCORE; Prime Sports Midwest; SportsChannel Ohio

Sports Time was a regional sports network in the United States of America. It was owned by a limited partnership headed by Anheuser-Busch and was launched on April 2, 1984. Sports Time was available in 15 states from Colorado to West Virginia.

== History ==
On July 18, 1983, the network was announced as a joint venture of Anheuser-Busch, Multimedia, Inc. (which notably owned TV stations KSDK and WLWT in the network's coverage footprint along with cable systems), and cable company Tele-Communications Inc. The cornerstone of the network's coverage would be games of the St. Louis Cardinals (then owned by the brewery), Kansas City Royals and Cincinnati Reds baseball teams. The network soon added Big Eight Conference college basketball, as well as St. Louis Blues hockey, Kansas City Kings basketball, a limited schedule of American Association minor-league baseball contests, and other collegiate and regional events. A two-year deal was reached to add Mid-American Conference basketball in December 1983, while Major Indoor Soccer League action (with five teams in the service area) was also added. The network maintained offices at 900 Walnut Street in St. Louis, near Busch Memorial Stadium, and Cincinnati facilities in the former WLWT studios at 2222 Chickasaw Street.

Sports Time was offered as a premium service that cost cable subscribers an additional $10 to $12 a month once it launched on April 3, 1984. That same day, Sports Time added the Cleveland Indians with a package of 25 to 30 games a year for two seasons, though the agreement did not cover Cleveland itself and Sports Time had no distribution in northeast Ohio. A month later, the Missouri Valley Conference signed a deal for college basketball telecasts on Sports Time.

Sports Time showed Reggie Jackson's 500th career home run on September 17, 1984. The Royals were playing the California Angels in Anaheim, California that night.

=== Distribution challenges ===
Sports Time was dogged throughout its year on air by distribution challenges. While not as acute as those faced by other premium sports cable channels, such as the short-lived Sportsvue in Wisconsin, issues cropped up. Warner Amex cable in the St. Louis area drew Sports Time's ire by making the channel available only to those who had "Super Qube" service, in violation of the contract between the two. Tavern owners in the St. Louis area also complained of high rates being charged to show Sports Time in their establishments. In Cincinnati, contractual problems between the Reds and the city of Cincinnati meant that a planned slate of 25 contests turned into fewer than a dozen.

As 1984 went on, the channel took increasing measures to boost its reach. Three months after claiming it had no interest in Florida, it debuted on some cable systems there. In October 1984, eager to increase circulation beyond its 45,000 subscribers in order to make the channel more attractive to advertisers, Sports Time allowed cable companies outside of the Cincinnati, Kansas City and St. Louis media markets the ability to place it in their basic lineups. This move drew the ire of the Reds, who believed that baseball's national television contracts precluded airing games on a regional basic cable network. The venture was losing money, and fast: Multimedia cut its third-quarter earnings forecast because of Sports Time-related losses, and Sports Time lost $2.9 million in one quarter.

=== Closure ===
It seemed like Sports Time might be able to survive for 1985. In February, it announced its plans to telecast 112 Cardinals and Royals contests for the 1985 baseball season—in which both teams reached the World Series—and the company was set to fill a distribution hole in St. Louis County, Missouri, when two holdout cable systems with 71,000 subscribers agreed to sign on. The network also considered shrinking its coverage footprint to Missouri and neighboring states and focusing on the Royals and Cardinals.

However, on February 28, 1985, Anheuser-Busch announced that Sports Time would go dark on March 31. It had 42,000 subscribers at closure—including 15,000 in St. Louis, 9,000 in Kansas City, and 3,000 in Cincinnati—when the network had said at launch that it needed 200,000. The timing of the closure allowed the venture to avoid paying rights fees to the Cardinals and Royals for the coming baseball season. Estimates indicated that the network lost more than $1 million per month. Management with the Cardinals was caught by surprise at the news of the channel's folding.

== Programming ==
Sports Time was a part-time channel, which aired in the evenings and from noon on weekends; Anheuser-Busch leased the rest of the Satcom III-R satellite transponder's air time to the Financial News Network. FNN aired during the business day. When Sports Time went under, A-B partnered with FNN to create SCORE. While SCORE was a national service, A-B contributed sets used on Sports Time programming and four on-air personalities that hosted its studio programming: Bill Brown, Byron Day, John Loesing and Todd Donoho.

In addition to its professional and collegiate programs, Sports Time broadcast the exhibition game between the United States Olympic basketball team against a group of National Basketball Association players, which was played at the Hoosier Dome in Indianapolis on July 9, 1984; the game drew a crowd of 67,678, which was the largest to see a basketball game in the United States at the time.

Sports Time also produced studio programming, including its sports news program Sports Desk: it cut back its studio productions in January 1985 in an attempt to contain costs.

== Later regional sports networks ==
The Cardinals, Royals and Reds all would return to cable television, some sooner than others.

In 1986, the Cardinals Cable Network was established, operating as a premium service and broadcasting 50 games a year. The Cardinals ended the cable arrangement after the 1989 season. Prime Sports, predecessor to Bally Sports Midwest, began carrying games of the Cardinals and Blues in the 1994–95 season.

The Royals would not appear on cable again until signing a deal with Fox Sports in 1997.

The Reds almost aired a "Reds Vision" pay-per-view service in 1986, but the 25-game package was canceled before Opening Day; another proposal failed in 1989. SportsChannel Cincinnati, the predecessor to Bally Sports Ohio, began carrying Reds games in 1990.
