= Jim Popkin =

American investigative journalist and author

Jim Popkin is an American investigative journalist and author. He won a 2007 Gerald Loeb Award, Edward R. Murrow Award, and the George Polk Award.

== Life ==
Popkin graduated with a BA from Northwestern University, and a Master's degree from Yale Law School. He is the president and founder of Seven Oaks Media Group, who provides strategic counsel to CEOs and executives. He also worked for more than twenty years at NBC News and began his career there at NBC–4. He has won four national Emmy Awards as well as two Edward R. Murrow Awards.

== Works ==
- Code Name Blue Wren, 2023
