= Frank Mottek =

American broadcast journalist

Frank Mottek is an American broadcast journalist known as “The Voice of Business News in Los Angeles” for his business reports on radio and television stations in Los Angeles, and hosting business news shows including "Mottek On Money." His broadcasts and podcasts have provided business, consumer and financial news to millions in the Greater Los Angeles area. Mottek also serves as moderator and master of ceremonies at business events and conferences. He is also known for his reporting and anchoring on TV stations KCAL-TV, KCBS-TV and KTLA in Los Angeles as well as the Nightly Business Report on PBS.

== Early life and education ==
Mottek received his Associate of Arts degree from Broward Community College in Fort Lauderdale, Florida and a Bachelor of Liberal Studies from Barry University in Miami.

== Career ==
=== Radio and television ===
- 1981–92 – Mottek was news anchor and reporter at WINZ, the CBS affiliate in Miami. During this time, he provided the live launch descriptions of more than 20 space shuttle launches on the CBS Radio Network. Mottek was on the air with CBS News Correspondent Christopher Glenn and was an eyewitness to the Space Shuttle Challenger disaster at the Kennedy Space Center in Florida on January 28, 1986
- 1989–91 – Business news anchor/correspondent on "The Nightly Business Report" on PBS.
- 1991–92 – Anchor and reporter at WTVJ-TV/Miami.
- 1992–2021 – News anchor/reporter at KNX (AM) Los Angeles KNX1070 Newsradio. He anchored the money news on the all-news radio station in Los Angeles. He also anchors the business news program Mottek On Money on air and on podcast.
- Mottek was on the air with CBS News Correspondent Christopher Glenn and was an eyewitness to the Space Shuttle Challenger disaster at the Kennedy Space Center in Florida on January 28, 1986.

== Honors ==
- 2021 Best Business and Consumer Reporting Golden Mike Award from the Radio and Television Association of Southern California for Mottek on Money on KNX
- 2013 Best "News Special" Golden Mike Award from the Radio and Television News Association of Southern California for "Healthcare Uncovered" on KNX
- 2013 Outstanding News Professional PRism Award from the Public Relations Society of America-L.A. Chapter
- 2011 Golden Mike Award from the Radio and Television News Association of Southern California for Best Business and Consumer Reporting
- President of the Florida AP Broadcasters 1986–1989

=== Filmography ===
Title	Year	Role	Notes
10 Cloverfield Lane	2016	Radio Broadcaster	Uncredited
