= Todd Donoho =

American radio and television sportscaster (born 1955)

Todd Donoho (born October 25, 1955) is an American radio and television sportscaster, who hosts the post-game show for Missouri Tigers basketball on the statewide Tiger Radio Network. He led sports news reporting in the 1990s for Los Angeles television station KABC-TV after working for stations across the country and later became a sports news anchor for Fox Sports West.

== Personal life, community involvement, and family ==
Donoho was born in Puerto Rico and lived briefly in Africa, before completing most of his childhood in Munster, Indiana. He is a graduate of the University of Missouri, earning a Bachelor of Journalism degree.

While at Missouri, Donoho married his college sweetheart, Paula (née Gerber), in 1979. They have three sons, one of whom, Kevin, was a star wide receiver at Hart High School in Newhall, California.

While working in the Los Angeles area, Donoho was a resident of Valencia, California and an amateur golfer. For a number of years, Donoho served as a host of a charity golf tournament in Valencia Country Club to benefit the Henry Mayo Newhall Memorial Hospital. He also was an honorary booster for Jordan High School in South Los Angeles.

After Todd Donoho's mid-career transition to broadcasting in Missouri, Paula taught English at Jefferson Junior High School, Kevin was sales representative for Nestle in Oklahoma City, son Jeff studied journalism at the University of Missouri and was a law student at its law school, and son Scott studied engineering at the University of Missouri.

Upon moving to Columbia, Missouri, Donoho continued to involve himself in his community, offering his time to West Boulevard Elementary School.

== Career ==
=== Early career ===
Prior to joining KABC, Donoho worked for WOTV in Grand Rapids, Michigan; WLWT, NBC's Cincinnati affiliate, alongside anchorman Jerry Springer; and FNN Score, the sports arm of the Financial News Network cable service, for five years as host of Time Out For Trivia. He also did occasional play-by-play for NBC Sports, in addition to freelance work for ABC Sports, Turner Sports, and Fox Sports Midwest.

=== KABC stint ===
During his time at KABC, Donoho was known in the Los Angeles media market for beginning and ending his sports anchor segments with sports trivia questions and for his trademark phrase, "take a hike". During Donoho's time on air, KABC's 11 p.m. newscast's ratings approached those of long-time regional leader KNBC.

Donoho also anchored the station's post-Monday Night Football program, titled Monday Night Live, from 1989 to 2000.

In Los Angeles, the similarity of Todd Donoho's name to that of UCLA football coach Terry Donahue was occasionally the source of humor for critics and viewers.

==== Critical reception ====
Prior to joining KABC in July 1989, Donoho received nearly all favorable reviews for his work. Early in his tenure at KABC, Donoho was criticized by local columnists and viewers for being "too cornball." Former LA Times columnist Jim Healy referred to Donoho as "Dorkoho". Early on, Donoho was rated by the LA Times and the TV Times's Steve Harvey as the worst sports broadcaster in Los Angeles.

Two weeks into his time at KABC, on the day of former Angels reliever Donnie Moore's suicide, Donoho led the segment with his usual trivia question; a number of Los Angeles sports media critics lambasted him.

Donoho adjusted his style and developed a following for his work and community service.

==== Break with station ====
In 1999, Donoho complained to station management when the time allotted for sports reporting was cut from 4.5 minutes to 2.5 minutes. After insisting that the sports report had to include game scores, Donoho was fired from the station. Donoho was unable to join another broadcasting entity immediately, because KABC continued paying him his salary through the end of the year.

By the time Donoho left Los Angeles to return to Missouri, he had earned five regional Emmys, three Associated Press Awards, and several Golden Mike Awards for sportscasting.

=== Move to Missouri ===
Donoho became a broadcaster for the post-game show for Missouri Tigers basketball on the statewide Tiger Radio Network.

== Other work ==
Donoho portrayed himself in the movie Blue Chips. During his time in between work for KABC and FSN West, he also assisted with research for a best-selling book-CD project of great calls in sports broadcasting history, "And the Crowd Goes Wild." Donoho has also written two children's books, "Hello, Truman!" and "Hello, Truman! Show Me Missouri", in addition to "MizzouRah! Memorable Moments in Missouri Tiger Football History."

Beginning in early 1988, Donoho was also a regular guest on local radio station KLOS's weekday morning drive time show, The Mark & Brian Show, during their "Stump the Commissioner" segment. He continued this work through at least 2009. In the early 2000s, Donoho was a radio sports anchor for KLOS's sister station, KSPN (AM).

It was announced on March 12, 2015, that Donoho would join the Mark in the Morning show on The Sound LA 100.3.

== See also ==
- Laura Diaz
- Christine Devine
- Jerry Dunphy
