= Treasure Detectives =

Treasure Detectives is a television series on CNBC. The reality show covers the search for expensive paintings by a group of art collectors, led by UK based fakes and forgeries expert Curtis Dowling (born June 11, 1967). Dowling has appeared on numerous BBC, ITV and Channel 4 shows.

== Cast ==
- Curtis Dowling – international fakes and forgeries expert
- Matthew Brandon Hutchens, aka Hutch – collector and investigator
- Catherine Kneibel
- Andy Smith

Curtis Dowling has been authenticating art for over 20 years and lives near Tiverton Devon Uk and have a wife Marta, who is Polish and two children, Amalie and Lily. He has not only presented programmes like Put Your Money Where Your Mouth Is but also Hidden Paintings, Inside Out London and Inside Out Anglia. He has appeared on Rogue Traders, Cash in the Attic, Cash in the Celebrity Attic, Live from Studio 5, X-Ray and was the Consultant on the hit Channel 4 documentary 'Elizabeth Taylor - Auction of a lifetime' having thought the idea up in the first place.

Curtis Dowling appeared on BBC Breakfast TV in September 2013 uncovering a John Constable painting and is now host of the new Channel 4 15-part TV series Hoarder SOS which ran on Channel 4 in October and November 2016. Most recently Curtis has been seen on Susan Calman’s Antiques adventure on Channel 5 filming directly from fakers den

== Success ==
Treasure Detectives is an 8-part series with each episode, lasting about an hour, covering the authentication of two items per show. According to Neilsens, it rated better than any other CNBC PRIME show. The show premiered on 5 March 2013 at 9pm with an initial viewing success for the time slot of 279,000 rising to a peak of 322,000 far exceeding nearly all other shows on CNBC PRIME.

It was filmed mostly in Los Angeles but many episodes travelled further afield to North Carolina, Salt Lake City, Kentucky, New York & Connecticut.

The series was sold to UKTV and started its UK run in September 2013 once again beating records in the 9pm slot for the channel.

Treasure Detectives was made by Endemol USA for CNBC PRIME.
