= LiveWire Professional =

LiveWire Professional is a MS-DOS program made by CableSoft. It was first introduced in 1988 as software/expansion board combination, which allowed to convert Financial News Network ticker from television receivers into ASCII for further analysis. The software is designed for stock brokers and financial analysts, allowing them to record and analyse the stock market, through the use of live feeds. However, its user interface was criticized as cumbersome.
