= Rena Margulies Chernoff =

American writer and Holocaust survivor (1933–2017)

- Born: July 6, 1933; Tomaszów Mazowiecki, Poland
- Died: July 3, 2017 (aged 83); New York City, U.S.
- Known for: Author, Holocaust survivor
- Notable work: The Tailors of Tomaszow: A Memoir of Polish Jews

Rena Margulies Chernoff (July 6, 1933 – July 3, 2017) was an American writer and Holocaust survivor from Tomaszów Mazowiecki, Poland. She's one of the youngest survivors of Auschwitz-Birkenau. She was born on July 6, 1933, and named after her father's mother, Rivka. Chernoff wrote The Tailors of Tomaszow: A Memoir of Polish Jews, originally published in 2014, with her son Allan Chernoff.

== Early life ==
Rena Margulies Chernoff's hometown was Tomaszów Mazowiecki, formed in 1788 in the Crown of the Kingdom of Poland by industrialist Tomasz Ostrowski. She was the daughter of Avram Chaim (Albert) Margulies, born March 8, 1909. Avram was a tailor and opened his own Parisian tailor workshop on August 10, 1931. Avram married Hinda Tenenbaum, who was the daughter of Hershel Tenenbaum and Raizel Kozlowska Tenenbaum, who were observant Orthodox Jews. Hinda became a dressmaker, and together with her husband worked in their tailoring shop, Tres Chic.

Rena Chernoff was raised with the help of a Polish nanny, a rare luxury for Jewish families during this time period. Her younger brother, Romek, was born on August 24, 1935.

== The Holocaust ==
In the years leading up to World War II, millions of Jews were forced to live in urban ghettos. By December 1941, Hitler decided to kill all Jews living in Europe. During the Holocaust the population of European Jewish was reduced from 9,740,000 to 3,642,000.

Chernoff's hometown of Tomaszów Mazowiecki, had nearly 14,000 Jewish residents prior to World War II; only 250 survived the Holocaust. Chernoff was six years old when Germany conquered Tomaszow. As a ten year old, she toiled in the Blizyn slave labor camp, 57 miles from Tomaszow in the Radom district of Poland, and was later moved to Birkenau, within the Auschwitz camp, where she was tattooed with the identification number A-15647.

== Life in the United States ==
At the war's end, Rena Chernoff and her mother had both survived the Holocaust. She and her mother returned to Tomaszow. There, they confronted anti-Semitism from local townspeople. They left Tomaszow in June 1946 to reside in a displaced persons camp in occupied Germany. She lived in the Schlachtensee Displaced Persons Camp from June 19 until August 7, 1946, and then in the Heidenheim camp until October 1949. On October 13, 1949, She emigrated to the United States, arriving in, New York on October 13, 1949. Chernoff found a new home in the United States, where she started a family, earned a master's degree, and became a teacher. In 1992, Rena Chernoff took her son, daughter, and husband back to Poland.

Chernoff died in New York City on July 3, 2017, at the age of 83.

== The Tailors of Tomaszow: A Memoir of Polish Jews ==
Rena Margulies Chernoff and her son Allan Chernoff authored The Tailors of Tomaszow: A Memoir of Polish Jews, published in 2014. Rena Chernoff used this book to reveal her own experiences from the Holocaust, as well as a collective memoir of other survivors of Tomaszow. The Chernoffs believe the history of Holocaust is essential, and Allan has said that "if that history were not written down, if it were not recorded, it would be lost."

In the first part of this book, Chernoff describes her childhood, family, and the city of Tomaszów Mazowiecki. The second part of her book covers the history of Tomaszów Mazowiecki and the Holocaust. She was one of the youngest survivors of the Holocaust and one of only 250 survivors from her town. In the book she wrote that this was a painful and unforgettable memory for her, her family, and in the history of Polish Jews during WWII.
