= Business Nation =

Television series

Business Nation, which debuted on January 24, 2007, is a monthly hour-long newsmagazine airing on CNBC, focusing on the stories behind the business headlines. This program also reveals the stories of business, finance, and the economy that touch the lives of all Americans.

== About the show ==
Hosted by David Faber, each edition of the program, which presents three stories a month, features a mixture of profiles, investigative pieces, exclusive interviews, and features. Business Nation is also the first regularly scheduled newsmagazine to focus solely on the business world. The format of this program is structured similarly to HBO's Real Sports.

Business Nation won an Emmy Award for Outstanding Investigative Reporting in 2007.
