= Susie Gharib =

Susie Gharib, born in 1950, is a business news journalist. Currently, she is Senior Special Correspondent for Fortune magazine. Gharib was also a contributor to Nightly Business Report produced by CNBC, a program that she co-anchored for 16 years until she left the show in December 2014. She was replaced by Sue Herera.

== Career ==
Gharib joined Nightly Business Report in 1998 after a 20-year career working at some of America’s various print and broadcast organizations, including CNBC, NBC, ESPN, and WABC-TV/New York. Gharib launched her career as a business journalist at Fortune magazine, where she was a senior writer and associate editor. Her previous work includes reporter positions at Newsweek, the Associated Press, and The Plain Dealer. In 1983, she moved from print to the then-new medium of TV business news when she joined Business Times on ESPN.

During part of her career she went by her married name, Susie Nazem.

== Awards ==
- In 2012, Gharib received the Elliot V. Bell Award from the New York Financial Writers’ Association for significant contribution to financial journalism.
- Gharib is the recipient of a 2013 Gracie Allen Award for NBR’s profile of the first female president, Drew Gilpin Faust, of Harvard University. Gharib received an earlier Gracie Award in 2001 as the top anchorwoman of a national news program.
- Gharib has also won the Fulbright Award in 2012 for furthering global business understanding, and the “Front Page Award” from the Newswoman’s Club of New York in both 2007 and 2002.
- Her 2002 Front Page Award was for an outstanding panel discussion with high-profile CEOs on how to restore investor confidence in the aftermath of the business scandals at Enron and WorldCom.
- She has also been named one of the nation's 100 most influential business journalists by the editors of TJFR, an industry publication.

== Education ==
Gharib graduated magna cum laude with Phi Beta Kappa honors from Case Western Reserve University. Gharib also earned her master's degree in international affairs at Columbia University. Gharib is among the outstanding graduates of Cleveland Heights High School featured in the book Every Tiger Has a Tale.

== Service ==
She is on the Board of Trustees of Case Western Reserve University, the Board of Advisors of Columbia University’s School of International and Public Affairs, and a member of the Economic Club of New York.

== Personal life ==
Gharib, one of four daughters of a Cleveland anesthesiologist, is of Iranian descent. One of her sisters is an endocrinologist in Boston.

Gharib is married to Fred F. Nazem and have two children.
