= The Car Chasers =

American television series

The Car Chasers is a television series on CNBC that broadcast from March 2013 through February 2015. The reality show covered car restoration professionals who repaired old cars and sold them at a profit. This program also aired in South America on the History Channel as Automaniacos.

== Reception ==
Allison Keene of The Hollywood Reporter said the show accurately reflects the purpose and focus of CNBC.
