= Trash Inc: The Secret Life of Garbage =

- Narrated by: Carl Quintanilla
- Country of origin: United States
- Original language: English

Original release
- Network: CNBC
- Release: September 29, 2010

Trash Inc: The Secret Life of Garbage is a one-hour television documentary film that aired on CNBC on September 29, 2010, about trash/garbage, what happens to it when it's "thrown away", and its impact on the world. The film is hosted by CNBC Squawk Box co-anchor Carl Quintanilla as he reports from various landfills (such as the largest in the United States, the Apex Landfill in Clark County, Nevada), business, and other locations in the United States (New York, New Jersey, Hawaii, South Carolina) and China (mostly Beijing).

The idea for Trash, Inc came during the Great Recession and the relative stability of publicly traded waste management companies.
