= Figment (website) =

Defunct self-publishing website

- Screenshot
- Website type: Community site
- Available in: English
- Owner: Random House
- Creators: Dana Goodyear, Jacob Lewis
- Website: Figment.com
- Commercial: Yes
- Registration: Optional, but required to access certain parts of the site and to create content such as books or forum threads.
- Launched: December 2010; 15 years ago
- Current status: Discontinued

Figment was an online community and self-publishing platform for young writers. Created by Jacob Lewis and Dana Goodyear, who both worked at The New Yorker, the site officially launched on December 6, 2010. At the time of its closure, Figment had over 300,000 registered users and over 440,000 'books', or pieces of writing. Other features included frequent writing contests, a blog, forums, and The Figment Review. On February 27, 2012, Figment announced it would purchase and merge user bases with its rival site, Inkpop.com. On March 1, 2012, the two sites merged userbases and works. On October 29, 2013, Figment was acquired by Random House Children's Group. As of June 4, 2025, the site now redirects to the Figment section of the Disney Store website. All stories on Figment were deleted during the shutdown. A story creation tool will be added to Underlined as part of the transition from Figment to Underlined.

== About Figment ==
Inspired by the popularity of the Japanese cell phone novel, Dana Goodyear, poet and journalist, and Jacob Lewis, former managing editor of The New Yorker, created Figment as a platform on which young adults can share their writing and interact with other writers. Figment spent several months in beta, and officially launched on December 6, 2010, gaining over 10,000 users the first week. Users could "publish" and access short stories, poetry, lyrics, essays, and novels through the site. Users were able to review, "heart", react and comment on works by other users. Over 300,000 accounts and 700,000 books were created. Figment's user base was mainly teens, but there was a significant number of older writers registered on the site. The site's policies did not allow registration by those under 13. Figment was featured in The New York Times, The L.A. Times, and The Today Show.

== Dream School ==
In December 2011, Figment published its first print book: Dream School by Blake Nelson. The novel is a sequel to Nelson's widely popular mid-nineties novel Girl. Figment first released Dream School in serial format on its web site as free content for all users, and then printed the book in a more traditional format. "It echoes the way Girl was serialized in the pages of Sassy magazine prior to being published," said Nelson. "I took a stack of fan letters that were sent to the magazine over to my editor's office and said this is the audience for this book."

== Inkpop ==
In March 2012, Figment combined with HarperCollins's online writing community, Inkpop. At the time of the merge, InkPop had 95,000 users and Figment had 115,000 users, with little overlap between the two sites. Susan Katz, the HarperCollins Children's Book president, said of the move: “We approached Figment because we’ve admired what they are doing in the digital space. Together we can broaden our marketing reach for our authors and their stories by tapping into this highly engaged group.”

== Contests ==
Figment occasionally offered writing contests to help writers hone their skills. Many of the contests focused on themes and issues presented in popular and upcoming young adult books, and provided prompts with which users can create their contest entries. The contests often involved published YA authors.

Contests included the participation of Paulo Coelho, Darren Shan, Gayle Forman, Jackson Pearce, Sherry Shahan, Lauren Oliver, Lisi Harrison, Billy Collins, Nicholas Sparks, Sara Shepard, Drusilla Campbell and many others.

=== Types of Contests ===
There were generally three types of contests on Figment: Random selection, heart based, and contests in which all entries are read. Resentment had grown significantly about random and heart based contests and various petitions and groups had been created to protest the heart system.

=== The Seventeen Magazine Fiction Contest ===
Seventeen Magazine hosted its 2011 fiction contest on Figment. Girls between the ages of 15 and 21 had to write a story of less than 500 words for the chance to win a $5,000 cash prize, the opportunity to have their story published on Seventeen.com, and a phone call with Maggie Stiefvater, author of the Wolves of Mercy Falls trilogy – Shiver, Linger, and Forever. 50 of the 60 finalists were chosen via Figment user votes, and the other 10 were picked by Seventeen editors. The grand prize winner was to be announced on April 1, 2012.

=== The Zinch Scholarship Contest ===
Users in high school or college were challenged to write a 600-character story about their coming-of-age moment and to submit to it the Figment page at Zinch.com for a chance to win a $500 scholarship. The judge of the contest is author Jonathan Safran Foer, writer of Extremely Loud and Incredibly Close. Entries could be submitted until March 31, 2012.

=== The Requiem Contest ===
Lauren Oliver, author of the Delirium trilogy, judged the Requiem Writing Contest, hosted by HarperTeen. Figment users between the ages of 13 and 21 living in the United States wrote short stories of 1,500 words or less using the prompt "Write a story where love is dangerous". The prizes were a 2-day trip to New York and the opportunity to write a column for Teen.com, in addition to the winner's story being featured on Teen.com. There were more than a thousand entries, and the winner was Rani Lee, author of "Swimming".

=== Defy the Dark Contest ===
Users were challenged to write a story between 2,000 and 4,000 words to be included in a HarperTeen anthology, Defy the Dark. The anthology's editor, Saundra Mitchell, judged the contest. 1242 stories were entered, totaling 3.35 million words. The winner was Kate Espey, author of "The Sunflower Murders". Two additional stories appeared on the Defy the Dark website, "Bogwater" by Grrrillaful and "After Illume" by Emily Skrutskie.

== Awards and Honorable Mentions ==
Figment was chosen as a winning start-up company at the O'Reilly Tools of Change for Publishing Conference 2011 and was also selected as a 15th Annual Webby Awards Official Honoree in the "Youth" category.

On February 25, 2012, it was announced that Figment would be receiving the 2011 Los Angeles Times Innovator's Award, as part of the Los Angeles Times Book Prize. The award honors "cutting edge work to bring books, publishing, and storytelling into the future."
