= Doug Adams (television producer) =

American television producer

Doug Adams is an American television producer for NBC Nightly News with Brian Williams.

He graduated from Bucknell University, in 1988.

== Awards ==
- 2004 Gerald Loeb Award for Television Short Form business journalism for "The Jobless Recovery"
- 2006 Gerald Loeb Award for Television Deadline business journalism for "The Katrina Deadline"
- Edward R. Murrow Award
- 2008 Emmy Award Breaking News Story Long Form, for NBC News Decision 2008 Election Night
- RTNDF German Fellowship
