= Anne Thompson (TV journalist) =

American journalist

Anne Thompson is an American journalist, working for NBC News as Chief Environmental Affairs correspondent. She covers the Catholic Church and environmental and economic issues.

== Career ==
Thompson began her journalism career in 1979 working for WNDU-TV in South Bend, Indiana where she was from 1979 to 1983 and then a consumer reporter for NBC affiliate KSDK-TV in Saint Louis, Missouri, from 1983 to 1986, and NBC affiliate WDIV-TV in Detroit, Michigan from 1986 to 1997.

She first joined NBC News in 1997 as a national correspondent. She shared two Gerald Loeb Awards for business journalism: the 2004 Television Short Form award for "The Jobless Recovery," and the 2006 Television Deadline award for "The Katrina Effect." From March 2005 to April 2007, she was Chief Financial Correspondent, covering issues such as the economic impact of Hurricane Katrina and the Martha Stewart trials. In April 2007, she became Chief Environmental correspondent and has covered many economic and environmental issues, particularly the 2010 BP Oil Spill in the Gulf of Mexico. She has also covered the Catholic Church including the late Pope emeritus Pope Benedict XVI and the late Pope Francis.

== Awards ==
She was awarded the 2017 Rachel Carson Award by the Audubon Society for her investigative journalism on the BP (British Petroleum) oil spill and on climate change.
