= Dana Goodyear =

American journalist and poet

Dana Goodyear (born 1976) is an American journalist and poet, the author of the forthcoming book Anything That Moves, and the co-founder of Figment, an on-line literary community. She is a staff writer at The New Yorker and teaches in the Master of Professional Writing program at the University of Southern California.

== Life and work ==
Goodyear graduated from Yale University in 1998, where she was Managing Editor of The New Journal, and was hired by The New Yorker in 1999. She became a staff writer in 2007. In 2008, she was named a Japan Society Media Fellow, and spent six weeks in Tokyo researching the emergence of the cell phone novel. Her story, "I ♥ Novels", was published in The New Yorker and collected in "The Best Technology Writing 2009".

In 2005, Goodyear published "Honey and Junk", a collection of poems. Her second collection "The Oracle of Hollywood Boulevard," was published by W.W. Norton in 2012.

She is the author of "Anything that Moves: Renegade Chefs, Fearless Eaters, and the Making of a New American Food Culture. (Riverhead Books: 2013.)

Goodyear's profile of James Cameron was a finalist for a 2010 National Magazine Award. "Killer Food", about the chefs at Animal, a Los Angeles restaurant, was included in "The Best Food Writing 2010". Her reporting on Driscoll's strawberries was selected for "The Best American Food Writing 2018." She has twice been honored by the James Beard Foundation for food journalism.

Goodyear lives in Los Angeles, and is the writer and host of the podcast "Lost Hills." Season 1, released in March 2021, chronicles the murder of Tristan Beaudette in Malibu Creek State Park.

== Publications ==
- Honey and junk. 2005.
- Anything that moves : renegade chefs, fearless eaters, and the making of a new American food culture. 2013.
- The oracle of Hollywood Boulevard : poems. 2013.
