= Tyler Mathisen =

American journalist (born 1954)

- Born: September 4, 1954 (age 71); Arlington, Virginia, U.S.
- Title: Host of Power Lunch
- Spouse: Joanne Lamarca

Tyler Chris Mathisen is a journalist for CNBC. He hosted Power Lunch through December 20, 2024.

== Early life and education ==
Mathisen was born in Arlington, Virginia in 1954. His father, Chris, was a war correspondent while in the United States Navy during World War II and covered the Surrender of Japan on board the USS Missouri and later was an administrative aide for Burr Harrison. His mother, Mary, was an artist. He graduated from the University of Virginia in 1976.

== Career ==
After graduating, Mathisen worked for Time Life books.

From 1982 to 1997, Mathisen was a writer and editor for Money. He supervised mutual funds coverage.

From 1991 until 1997, he was money editor of Good Morning America. In 1993, he won the American University-Investment Company Institute Award for Personal Finance Journalism for Caring for Aging Parents, which aired on Good Morning America. He also won an Emmy Award for a report on Black Monday (1987) that aired on WCBS-TV in New York.

Mathisen joined CNBC in 1997.

== Host shows ==
- Business Center (1997–1999)
- Closing Bell (2002–2005)
- High Net Worth (2004–present)
- Nightly Business Report (2013–2018)
- Open Exchange (2002–2003)
- Power Lunch (2009—2024)

Location, Location, Location. (Real estate show).

== Personal life ==
In June 2004, he married Joanne Lamarca, a producer for Today. They met when Lamarca was a producer for one of Tyler's shows. They live in Montclair, New Jersey. In the 2016 United States presidential election, he voted for Michael Bloomberg as a write-in candidate.
