= Worldnet Television and Film Service =

Former international TV station

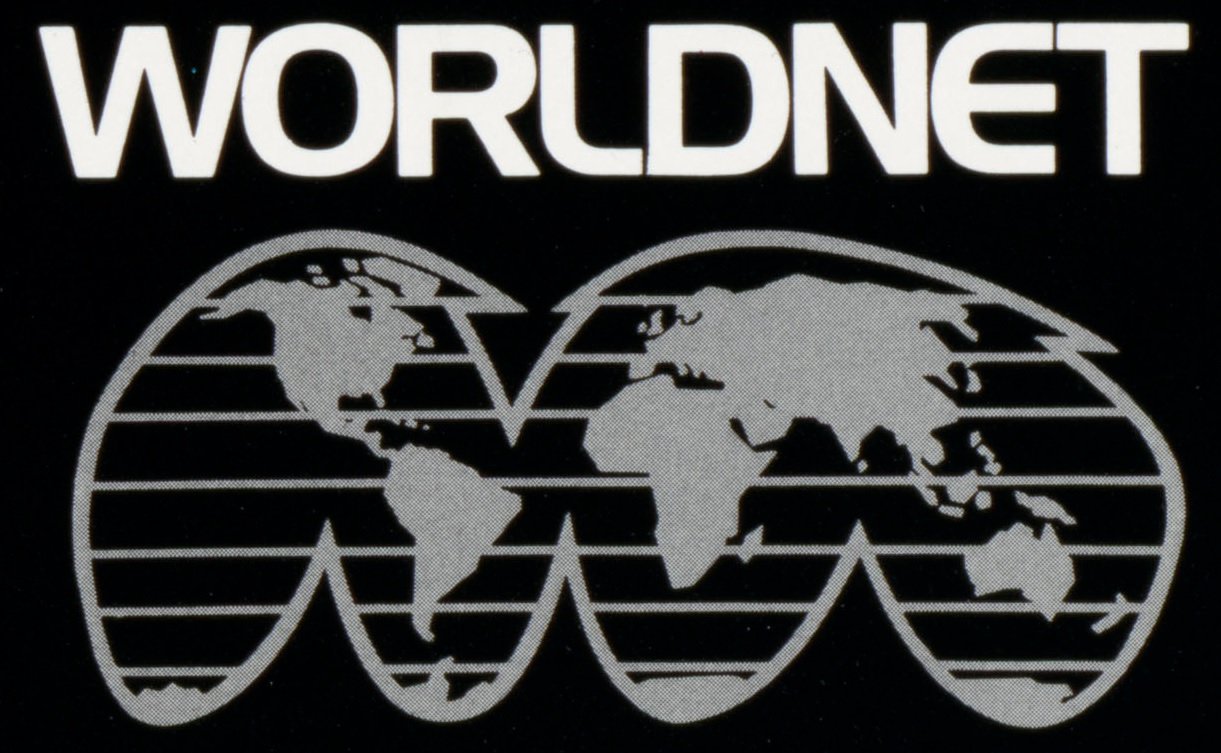
- Country: United States
- Broadcast area: Worldwide
- Headquarters: Washington, D.C.

Programming
- Language: Multilingual

Ownership
- Owner: Broadcasting Board of Governors

History
- Launched: 1983
- Closed: May 16, 2004 (merged to VOA)

Links
- Website: www.ibb.gov/worldnet (closed)

Worldnet Television and Film Service was an American state-funded cable and satellite television channel directed to audiences outside of the United States. Its studios were located in Washington, D.C. It broadcast 24 hours a day. Worldnet had the mission to show "a balanced and accurate picture of American society, policies, and people".

== History ==
Worldnet was launched in 1983. In the beginning, it worked under the umbrella of the United States Information Agency (USIA). Later, Worldnet became part of the Broadcasting Board of Governors (BBG).

Between 1993 and 1997, under the leadership of Clinton appointee Charles Fox, Worldnet's audience expanded from less than 300 to 1400 broadcast and cable outlets in Africa, the Americas, Europe, and the Middle East. In 1997, Fox led the organization from analog to a digital platform and supervised the production and distribution of "Window on America" series that encouraged Ukraine's adoption of democracy.

On September 11, 2001, Worldnet, using Bloomberg Television, interrupted its regular programming on 7 satellites to broadcast raw footage of terrorist attacks in New York City and Washington, DC.

On May 16, 2004, Worldnet was merged into the Voice of America to reduce costs. It become "VOA TV".

== Programs ==
Programs produced and syndicated by Worldnet were provided in Arabic, Croatian, English, French, Mandarin, Spanish, Russian, Polish, Serbian, Ukrainian, among others. They were transmitted via satellite, and also via foreign TV broadcast and cable systems.

Some of the syndicated programming produced by other U.S. networks included the NewsHour with Jim Lehrer, Nightly Business Report, Computer Chronicles, and Bloomberg Information Television.

American English-teaching telecourses were part of the list of programs. One of them was Crossroads Cafe, which combined comedy, drama, and English skills training.

== Law ==
The Smith–Mundt Act of 1948 prohibited Worldnet from broadcasting directly to American citizens. The intent of the legislation was to protect the American public from propaganda by its own government.
