= Financial News Network =

American television network

- Screen caption of channel logo and the network's original iteration of its ticker.
- Country: United States
- Broadcast area: United States
- Affiliates: See Below
- Headquarters: Santa Monica, California, later Rockefeller Center and Los Angeles, California

Programming
- Language: English
- Picture format: 480i (SDTV)

Ownership
- Owner: Rodney Buchser, Dr. Glen H. Taylor and Merrill Lynch (1981–1991); CNBC (1991)
- Key people: Rodney Buchser; Glen H. Taylor
- Sister channels: SCORE

History
- Launched: November 30, 1981; 44 years ago
- Closed: May 21, 1991; 35 years ago
- Replaced by: CNBC; Bloomberg Television

The Financial News Network (FNN) was an American financial and business news television network launched on November 30, 1981. The network aimed to broadcast programming nationwide, five days a week, for seven hours a day on 13 stations in an effort to expand the availability of business news for public dissemination. FNN was founded by Glen H. Taylor, a former minister of the Christian Church (1950–1956) and a producer of films for the California Department of Education. In February 1991, the channel was purchased by NBC and operations were integrated with its rival cable financial news network, CNBC, on May 21, 1991.

== Early history ==
=== Founding ===
[W]e had no resources, we had no money. Most every interview was a phoner and we covered it with graphics or videotape, which actually got so stale that at one point the stock market floor videotape that we used, [...] was so old that we got a call from somebody at the New York Stock Exchange, and [...] he said, "You know that guy who's in the shot on the floor of the New York Stock Exchange? He's been dead for two years."

— Former presenter Ron Insana in 2004,

The Financial News Network (FNN) was founded in 1981 by Glen Taylor, who served as chairman of the newly created five-member Board of Directors. Other board members included Karen Tyler, Head of Production; Rob Fisher, Vice President of Business Affairs; and Rodney Buchser, who had previously been the general manager of KWHY-TV, an independent station in Los Angeles.

The concept originated in the late 1960s when Quotron, a quotation ticker vendor, supported WCIU in Chicago and KWHY in Los Angeles with an initial limited 'ticker scroll'. In 1969, Registered Investment Advisor Eugene Inger joined KWHY-TV and expanded financial television in Los Angeles with reporting, analysis and broader coverage. Inger extended the service to the San Francisco area in 1970 on KOFY, Channel 20. He also provided financial TV programming to KDNL in St. Louis and pioneered WKID, Channel 51, serving South Florida. During this time, FNN began programming on Channel 18 in Los Angeles, competing with Inger and KWHY.

In 1975, Newark, New Jersey–based WBTB-TV (channel 68), an independent station owned at the time by Blonder-Tongue Broadcasting, was dark and not broadcasting. Eugene Inger revived the station by investing in channel 68, which served the New York City market. He served as General Manager and hosted a daily Wall Street programming block on WBTB, titled Stock Market Today during market hours and Wall Street Perspective in the evening, beginning in the fall of 1975. Keith Houser, the station's assistant general manager, worked with vendors to facilitate the ticker tape crawl across the bottom of the screen, with a delay (mistakenly attributed as a two-hour delay in a TV Guide reference), as was required at the time. The ticker ran across the lower third of the screen, with stock prices on the top (white) band and index prices on the bottom (blue) band. After the first year of programming, the SEC permitted just a twenty-minute delay.

The concept was well-established by WCIU in Chicago, KWHY in Los Angeles and Inger's day-long market coverage in Miami/Fort Lauderdale. Contrary to suggestions in TV Guide, the "specialty programming" did not encounter regulatory hurdles. Over the years, FNN grew its affiliates, generally not overlapping with Inger's targeted markets. However, Inger eventually "affiliated" with FNN through an arrangement that allowed him to take some programming and data feed from FNN while retaining local coverage and interviews hosted on his stations. The Chicago and Los Angeles stations evolved independently.

KWHY was the first television station on the West Coast to offer daily market news accompanied by a digital stock ticker "crawl" at the bottom of the screen. It was followed by WCIU in Chicago, KEMO in San Francisco, and FNN on Los Angeles' Channel 18. This innovation allowed stock traders and investors to stay on top of market action without subscribing to an expensive stock quotation service. However, at that time, computers could not handle the full stock feed so the ticker could only display pre-selected stocks, making the system highly manual and cumbersome. (The first fully automated stock ticker to appear on television would not be developed until 1996, for the now-defunct CNNfn.)

Gene Inger's approach was simpler: he took a feed from Reuters or UPI (both of which occasionally provided data feeds) and used a split-screen to display a camera shooting the tapes, with studio programming on the top portion. Inger was independent and never had a personal or corporate role with FNN, aside from a limited mutual program affiliation later. However, he became one of the original Market Maven contributors to CNBC, which eventually absorbed all financial programming over time. Years later, competition arose from Bloomberg Television (which became the direct successor of FNN) and Fox Business Channel. Inger continued to appear as a guest on CNBC for years and remains active as of 2024, providing daily market analysis reports online through his daily market reflections on X (formerly Twitter) @stockseer.

With the earlier launch of CNN by Ted Turner paving the way (Inger provided the original stock market commentary to Ted Turner's WTBS Channel 17 in Atlanta, WRET-TV [later WPCQ, now WCNC] in Charlotte and Hubbard's Channel 44 in Tampa), and following a 1975 TV Guide article about Gene Inger's programming success in New York, Taylor and Buchser realized that newly available technology made it possible to combine KWHY/Inger-style live market reporting with on-screen quotes and the concept of national news via satellite.

FNN's early history was not highly profitable and within a few years, Buchser severed his relationship with the fledgling network to launch a financial marketing services firm called FMS Direct. In its early years, FMS Direct produced infomercials and direct response television spots, which more often than not ran on FNN, the network Buchser had helped found.

Harvey "Scott" Ellsworth, the creator and on-air host of the popular radio program Scott's Place, which aired on Los Angeles radio station KFI from 1967 until 1974, was one of FNN's initial anchors.

=== Private financing ===
FNN received its early private financing from Biotech Capital Corporation, which later changed its name to Infotechnology, Inc. Biotech Capital was also one of the few publicly held "Business Development Companies" governed by the Business Development Company Act of 1980.

In 1981, shortly before its initial public offering led by Paulson Investment Company, Taylor, then the chairman, resigned due to previous legal difficulties. Jeremy Wiesen, a professor of business accounting and entrepreneurship at the Stern School of Business, New York University, and a former Securities and Exchange Commission employee, became chairman. The network's primary audience consisted of small investors.

FNN's principal studio was in Santa Monica, California, but the network later established operations in New York, on the ground floor of Merrill Lynch's headquarters in Manhattan, where passersby could view its broadcast operations. Merrill Lynch was one of FNN's initial private investors. In 1984, the company moved its editorial headquarters to New York and hired Nightly Business Report executive producer Mark J. Estren to oversee the network's shift in direction towards the cable market.

=== Over-the-air affiliates ===
Initially, the channel aired only during daytime hours on a mix of broadcast stations and cable television providers. Over-the-air affiliates included:

- KSCI, Los Angeles (now a Shop LC affiliate)
- WATL, Atlanta (now a MyNetworkTV affiliate)
- WPWR-TV, Chicago (now a MyNetworkTV affiliate)
- KJTV (now KCIT), Amarillo (now a Fox affiliate)
- KNXV, Phoenix (now an ABC affiliate)
- WSWS, Columbus, Georgia (now Hot 97 TV affiliate WHOT-TV)
- KTWS (now KDFI), Dallas (now a MyNetworkTV affiliate)
- WKID (now WSCV), Miami/Ft. Lauderdale (now a Telemundo O&O)
- WWSG-TV, Philadelphia (now CBS-owned independent WPSG); replaced in late 1982 by WRBV-TV, Vineland, NJ (now Univision-owned WUVP)
- WCCO-TV, Minneapolis (now a CBS owned-and-operated station)
- KSTS-TV 48 San Jose, CA (now a Telemundo O&O)
- WWHT (now WFUT), Newark, NJ (now an UniMás affiliate)
- WGGT (now WMYV), Greensboro, NC (now a MyNetworkTV affiliate)
- WRHT (now WPXD), Detroit (now an Ion Television affiliate)
- KDNL-TV, St. Louis (now an independent station)
- WGNO, New Orleans (now an ABC affiliate)
- WBTI-TV (now WSTR-TV), Cincinnati (now a MyNetworkTV affiliate)
- WQTV (now WBPX), Boston (now an Ion Television affiliate)
- KSTW, Seattle (now an independent station)
- WNUV-TV, Baltimore (now a CW affiliate)
- WCQR (now WDCW), Washington, D.C. (now a CW affiliate) (WCQR received its feed from WNUV via microwave, with local insertion provided at WNUV)
- WPTT-TV (now WPNT), Pittsburgh (now a CW/MyNetworkTV affiliate)
- KAUT-TV, Oklahoma City (now a CW affiliate)
- WSTG-TV (now WNAC-TV), Providence (now a Fox affiliate)
- KGCT-TV (now KMYT-TV), Tulsa (now a MyNetworkTV affiliate)
- KIDY, San Angelo (now a Fox affiliate)
- WDDD (now WTCT), Marion, IL (now a TCT affiliate)
- WRLH-TV, Richmond (now a Fox affiliate)
- WLJC-TV, Lexington (now a Cozi TV affiliate)
- KZAZ-TV (now KMSB), Tucson (now a Fox affiliate)
- WZTV, Nashville (now a Fox affiliate)
- KSTU, Salt Lake City (now a Fox affiliate)
- WTTO, Birmingham (now a CW affiliate)
- WTSG-TV (now WFXL), Albany, GA (now a Fox affiliate)
- WRIP, Chattanooga (now WDSI-TV, a True Crime Network affiliate)
- KUSI-TV, San Diego (now an independent station)
- WXXA-TV, Albany, NY (now a Fox affiliate)
- KECH (now KPXG-TV), Portland, OR (now an Ion Television affiliate)
- WWMA-TV (now WXMI), Grand Rapids, MI (now a Fox affiliate)
- WBHW-TV (now WRSP-TV), Springfield, IL (now a Fox affiliate)
- WTVE, Reading, PA
- KEKR-TV (now KSMO-TV), Kansas City, MO (now a MyNetworkTV affiliate)

=== SCORE ===
In 1985, FNN severed ties with its broadcast stations and established a 24-hour cable-exclusive feed, which was launched on May 1, 1985. At night, it offered the Cable Sports Network, a venture between the Mizlou Television Network and Tom Ficara, which was subsequently replaced by SCORE, a mini-network that aired sports events and news. Also airing in the overnight hours were Venture, a series of long-form speeches by business leaders, and TelShop, a shop-at-home service.

In the late 1980s, Infotechnology Inc., the New York–based information technology and venture capital company chaired by Earl Brian, which also owned United Press International, increased its stake to 47 percent and remained one of FNN's largest shareholders until Brian, the CEO of both UPI and FNN, was later convicted on fraud charges related to UPI and FNN. At its height, FNN was available on 3,500 cable systems, reaching a potential audience of 35 million homes across the country. The network moved into newly built modern TV studios and production facilities in the Wang Building in Los Angeles and in New York's Rockefeller Center.

== Later history ==
=== Financial scandals and accounting disputes ===
In 1990, only months after launching its biggest advertising campaign ever, FNN fell victim to two of the main topics of its broadcasts: a financial scandal and an accounting dispute. During that year's audit, the network's auditor, Deloitte & Touche, discovered irregularities involving its chief financial officer, C. Steven Bolen. The irregularities were serious enough that Deloitte stated its 1989 audit could not be relied upon. FNN initiated an internal investigation and found evidence of unauthorized payments made by Bolen to himself. Bolen was fired in October. Additionally, Deloitte insisted that FNN report a $28 million investment in a data system for brokers as an expense. FNN argued that this would significantly worsen its balance sheet, violating covenants with its banks and triggering a default on its line of credit. FNN replaced Deloitte with Coopers & Lybrand and reported a $72.5 million loss for fiscal 1990. Facing a need for a major cash infusion to stay in business, FNN put itself up for sale in November.

=== Proposed merger with CNBC ===
In February 1991, FNN reached a handshake agreement with a partnership of Dow Jones & Company and Westinghouse Broadcasting (Group W) for $90 million. However, just a few days later, FNN accepted an unexpected $105 million offer from NBC, which owned FNN's then two-year-old rival, CNBC. NBC had faced challenges getting cable systems to carry CNBC and intended to merge CNBC with FNN (at that time, CNBC was available in only 17 million homes). Matters became more complicated in March when FNN filed for Chapter 11 bankruptcy, triggering a lively bidding war for the network.

Group W and Dow Jones raised their offer to $115 million but were turned down on a technicality by Bankruptcy Court Judge Francis Conrad. Dow Jones and Group W refused to keep the bidding open until May 31, 1991. NBC then raised its offer to $115 million, which was accepted by Conrad. However, that decision was overturned on appeal.

Group W/Dow Jones and CNBC both significantly raised their bids. Group W/Dow Jones offered $167 million, while CNBC offered $154 million. However, the CNBC bid included more cash, whereas the Dow Jones/Group W bid included payments tied to revenue targets over three years. Conrad awarded FNN to CNBC, considering its offer to be more realistic.

=== Closure ===
FNN ceased operations at 6:00 p.m. Eastern Time on May 21, 1991. CNBC immediately took over FNN's satellite transponder space, more than doubling its audience in one stroke, and branded its business day programming as "CNBC/FNN Daytime" until 1992. CNBC also adopted FNN's on-air look and news style, and incorporated features of FNN's ticker into its own on-screen stock ticker. While most of FNN's employees were laid off due to the merger (with many of whom were eventually hired by Bloomberg L.P. to launch Bloomberg Television three years later on FNN's former channel space), a select number of FNN anchors and reporters (including Bill Griffeth, Ron Insana, Allan Chernoff, and Joe Kernen) were retained by CNBC. Sue Herera, who joined FNN at age 21 and quickly became an anchor, had moved to NBC and the newly launched CNBC before FNN's demise. Griffeth and Herera were later reunited at CNBC, co-anchoring Power Lunch until 2011 and subsequently anchoring Nightly Business Report from 2018 until its closure in 2019. Gene Inger, an original pioneer of financial television, did not continue with FNN beyond his stations' affiliation but became an original Market Maven frequent guest on CNBC. Inger declined to stay with CNBC, having semi-retired to Florida. He remained a guest, often with Mark Haines or Bill Griffeth, including providing the first remote fiber uplink to CNBC from Fort Lauderdale. As of 2022, Inger continues to provide daily market analysis online.

== See also ==
- CNBC – successor in interest to the Financial News Network
- Bloomberg Television – took over the channel space of Financial News Network and hiring most of former FNN workforce
- LiveWire Professional – MS-DOS software for conversion of Financial News Network stock market ticker to computer readable format
