= Darren Gersh =

American journalist

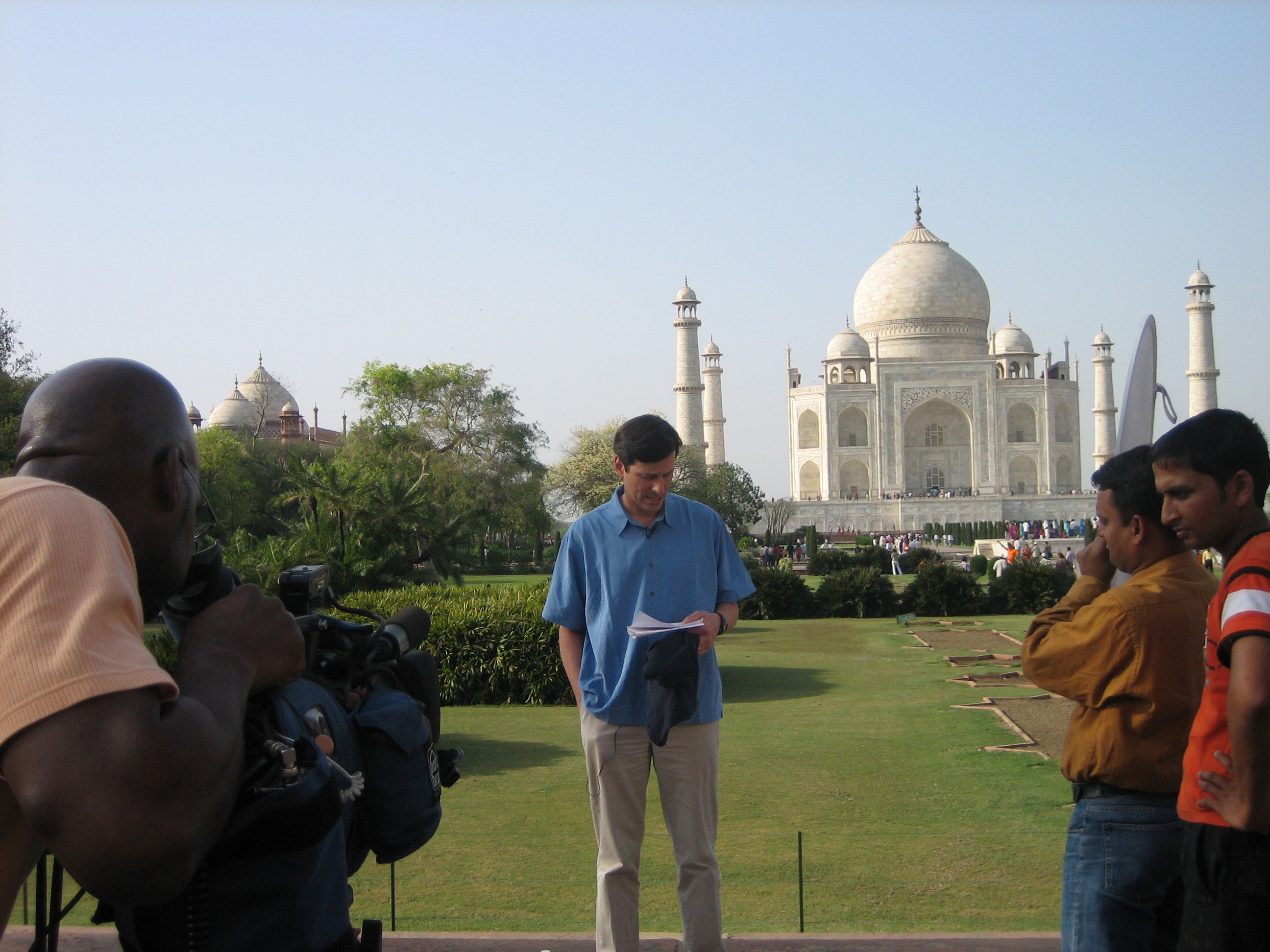
Darren Gersh on location for "India's Promise"

Darren Gersh was the Washington, D.C. bureau chief for the PBS show, Nightly Business Report from 1995 through 2013. He made the move to public service when he joined the Consumer Financial Protection Bureau on June 3, 2013. While at the CFPB, Gersh was the Senior Financial Education Campaign Coordinator, where he was responsible for developing the new educational campaign for mortgage consumers and intermediaries. He is currently a Senior Media Relations Specialist for the Federal Reserve.

Gersh was educated at Yale University. He produced numerous segments for NBR including many specials with in depth coverage of the economies, cultures and issues relating to foreign countries such as China and Vietnam. He won an Emmy for reporting on China in and a Loeb award for his special on India.

== Awards ==
- 2005 Emmy Award for Business and Financial Reporting for “China’s Century of Change.”
- 2008 Gerald Loeb Award for Television Daily business journalism for "India's Promise"
