= Bill Griffeth =

American journalist and television anchor

- Born: William Curtis Griffeth; August 7, 1956 (age 70); Los Angeles, California, U.S.
- Education: California State University, Northridge
- Occupation: Author
- Website: www.billgriffeth.com

Bill Griffeth is an author and retired TV news anchor.

== Early life and education ==
In 1980, Griffeth received a bachelor's degree in journalism from California State University, Northridge. While a student there, Griffeth co-hosted a weekly interview show, "Straightalk," with Rick Holicker, on KCSN, the university's then-NPR-affiliated radio station. Along with Holicker, he won the Golden Mike Award from the Radio & Television News Association of Southern California for a documentary on NASA's Viking program, titled "The Flight to Mars." In 2000, CSUN honored him with its Distinguished Alumnus Award. In 2017, he received an honorary doctorate.

== Career ==
Griffeth was part of the production team that started the Financial News Network in 1981. He was nominated for a CableACE award as best news anchor for his work anchoring FNN's coverage of Black Monday (1987).

Griffeth joined CNBC in 1991, when NBC purchased FNN and merged it with CNBC. He anchored several programs for CNBC and received 6 CableACE nominations as Best News Anchor.

CNBC announced on December 12, 2019 that he was retiring after almost 30 years with the network.

== Personal life ==
Griffeth is passionate about genealogy and after undergoing genetic testing in 2012, found out that the person he considered his father was not his biological father.

In 1982, he married his wife, Cindy. Since 1992, they have been residents of Park Ridge, New Jersey. They have a son, Chad, and a daughter, Carlee. Bill is a member of and teaches bible study at The Hillsdale United Methodist Church.

=== Host shows ===
- Nightly Business Report (2018–2019)
- Closing Bell (2011–2018)
- Power Lunch (1996–2009)
- The Edge (1999-March 2000)
- Market Wrap (1991–2002)
- Strictly Business
- The Money Club

== Bibliography ==
- Griffeth, Bill (1994). Bill Griffeth's 10 Steps to Financial Prosperity. Grand Central Publishing. ISBN 978-1557385758.
- Griffeth, Bill (1995). The Mutual Fund Masters. Probus Publishing. ISBN 978-1557385826.
- Griffeth, Bill (2007). By Faith Alone: One Family's Epic Journey Through 400 Years of American Protestantism. Harmony. ISBN 978-0307337283.
- Griffeth, Bill (2016). The Stranger in My Genes: A Memoir. New England Historic Genealogical Society. ISBN 978-0880823449.
