= Nightly Business Report =

American television series

- Also known as: NBR
- Genre: Newsmagazine
- Created by: Linda O'Bryon
- Presented by: List of presenters
- Theme music composer: Edd Kalehoff
- Country of origin: United States
- Original language: English
- No. of seasons: 40
- No. of episodes: 10,680

Production
- Production locations: New York City, New York, U.S.
- Camera setup: Multi-camera
- Running time: 30 minutes
- Production companies: NBCUniversal (2013–2019); NBR Worldwide Inc. (2010–2013); NBR Enterprises, Inc. and WPBT Miami/Community Television Foundation of South Florida, Inc. (1979–2010)

Original release
- Network: PBS or PBS Member Stations
- Release: January 22, 1979 – December 27, 2019

Nightly Business Report is an American business news magazine television program that aired on public television stations from January 22, 1979, to December 27, 2019, for most of that time syndicated by American Public Television. Internationally the show was seen on CNBC Europe and CNBC Asia.

From January 22, 1979, to March 1, 2013, the show was produced at WPBT in Miami, Florida. In February 2013, CNBC purchased the program and closed its Miami operations.

On November 11, 2019, CNBC announced that Nightly Business Report would be discontinued at the end of the year. The final broadcast aired on December 27, 2019, which ended NBR's nearly 41–year run.

== Format ==
The daily program consisted of reports on the changes in the stock market, indices, and stocks of note for the day, including the Dow Jones Industrial Average, NASDAQ, the S&P 500, and other major markets, as well as interviews with important business persons, generally CEOs of major companies as well as economists, market analysts and policy makers.

Special programs on market holidays departed from this format, and often dealt with a single subject or theme; New Year's Day and Independence Day editions tended to focus on retrospectives and predictions for the past and coming fiscal periods. The program often concluded with a commentary. Segments within the program included Market Monitor, Street Critique, Women in Leadership, and Planet Forward to name a few. There was a 15-minute morning version of NBR called Morning Business Report hosted by Melissa Conti that ran from January 3, 1994, to December 31, 2002.

== Broadcast history ==
The idea for a business news program had come from several businessmen on the WPBT Board. Linda O'Bryon, who was WPBT's News Director at the time, headed the effort to get NBR on the air. In the fall of 1978, she was approached by senior management and asked to create a daily business news program. She developed the program concept and expanded the editorial staff to launch NBR (then called "The Nightly Business Report"). Paul Kangas was among the first to join, signing on as its stock market commentator. O'Bryon and Merwin Sigale were the first co-anchors. The editorial/production team that launched the program included WPBT veterans Rodney Ward, Bruce Eibe, and Jeff Huff, and Jack Kahn, who was the program's first producer.

Starting on January 22, 1979, NBR was initially launched as a local show, then two years later, on October 19, 1981, it was launched nationwide on 125 public stations around the country. The show was originally 15 minutes long, but it was expanded to 30 minutes later in 1979. Merwin Sigale went on to resign in 1980, being replaced by former WTVJ anchor Del Frank. The first regular commentator on the program when it went national was Alan Greenspan, then a private economist, who remained as an NBR commentator until his appointment as Chairman of the Federal Reserve in 1987. A number of public television stations supplemented the program's newsgathering efforts by serving as "bureaus" for the program.

In 1989, Jim Wicks was named co-anchor, and moved from the flagship station of the Canadian Broadcasting Corporation in Toronto where he was main anchor. At the end of his contract, Wicks moved to ABC News in Cleveland. He has since left the television news business and returned to his motion picture career where he got his start. He works in post-production as a film colorist.

From 1989 to 1991, broadcast journalist Frank Mottek served as substitute anchor for Paul Kangas providing the "Stock Market Report and Commentary." Mottek solo anchored the program on January 1, 1991, and periodically co-anchored NBR with Paul Kangas while filling in for the other two main anchors. Mottek is currently business news anchor in Los Angeles on all news station KNX and host of the business news program Mottek On Money.

In 1990, on the height of the series' popularity, WPBT launched its unit, NBR Enterprises to sell videotapes and newsletters that was centered around the series. Following it, the show came yet another overhaul in 1991, when one anchor came from New York, and the other anchor came from Miami, while adding its own bureaus in Los Angeles and Chicago, and hired Cassie Seifert to serve as anchor of the desk in the New York department.

In 1998, financial journalist Susie Gharib joined the anchor desk with Paul Kangas. Gharib anchored from the heart of New York's financial district, while Kangas remained at the program's production center in Miami.

From 1988 to 1997, NBR was co-produced by Reuters, and from 1997 to 2001, it was co-produced by its arch-rival before its bankruptcy, Bridge Information Systems.

NBR was also seen internationally through Worldnet, the U.S. Radio and Television Armed Services network and on SBS in Australia and Triangle Television in New Zealand. Audio of the program aired on SiriusXM satellite radio at 7:00pm ET. NBR operated three reporting bureaus with full-time staff members as well as bureaus in Denver, Silicon Valley, and Phoenix operated in partnership with the public television stations in those markets.

In 2005, the show switched distributors from American Public Television, to PBS, in order to avoid the risk of losing affiliates and make the show accessible to the PBS National Programming Service.

Over the years, NBR received numerous awards. In 2005, for extended coverage of China's emergence as an international economic power, and in 2006 the website was honored with a Best In Class award from the International Media Council. Rodney Ward took over from Linda O'Bryon in 2006 after she had left to join KQED, serving as executive editor and senior vice president through 2011. O'Bryon eventually became president and chief executive officer of South Carolina ETV; she retired in 2017.

In 2009, NBR began broadcasting in high definition, with broadcasts presented in a letterboxed format for viewers with standard-definition television sets watching either through cable or satellite television. The program also introduced a new set and upconverted its existing graphics package to HD.

Paul Kangas's last broadcast for Nightly Business Report was on December 31, 2009, ending a 30-year run. The following day, on January 1, 2010, Tom Hudson took over as NBR's anchor, broadcasting from Miami, and reporting on topics such as Federal Reserve interest rate policy, corporate governance and shareholder activism as well as providing insights to daily market activity. Prior to co-anchoring Nightly Business Report, he was host and managing editor of the nationally syndicated financial television program First Business. In July 2011, Hudson was named Managing Editor and Co-anchor, a newly combined position with both editorial and managerial responsibility.

On August 23, 2010, it was announced that WPBT-TV had sold the show to NBR Worldwide Inc., a newly formed, privately held company headed by Mykalai Kontilai, who became the majority owner of the program. Kontilai, an entrepreneur in the Instructional Television Distribution (ITV) industry. Gary Ferrell, a former president and chief executive of North Texas Public Broadcasting (parent company of KERA-TV in Dallas, Texas), is the company's Chief Financial Officer. The sale was first proposed in February. According to WPBT, the station would continue to be associated with the show as a presenting station, and the sale reflected their assessment that NBR Worldwide Inc. had "the ideas and resources and potential to take it to the next level" and "can do more things with it than WPBT could." Rick Schneider, President and chief executive officer of WPBT, said the staff and editorial team won't change and "Nobody loses their job as a result of this." Until the name changed, the program was carried under the "Community Television Foundation of South Florida, Inc." banner and produced by NBR Enterprises, Inc./WPBT Miami.

Schneider's promises proved short-lived. In November 2010, NBR Worldwide Inc. announced a restructuring of the Nightly Business Report staff. That restructuring resulted in job cuts for four on-air contributors and half the reporting staff, including Scott Gurvey (New York bureau chief), Stephanie Dhue (Washington), Jeff Yastine (Miami) and Jamila Trindle (Washington DC), in addition to founding producer Jack Kahn and three other behind-the-scenes personnel.

On November 16, 2010, NBR Worldwide Inc. announced the promotions of Rodney Ward from Executive Editor to Executive Vice President of Special Projects. Ward's former executive editor duties were assumed by managing editor Wendie Feinberg, who was also promoted to Vice President/Managing Editor. Those changes also did not last long. On July 11, 2011, following the decision of PBS to drop the broadcast from its national schedule and cut all funding, NBR Worldwide Inc. announced the departures of Rodney Ward as Executive Vice President of Special Projects, and Wendie Feinberg, as Vice President/Managing Editor. In a press release, NBR Worldwide said the moves were "...part of its ongoing efforts to streamline operations and maximize resources." Chief Executive Officer Mykalai Kontilai said Miami-based anchor Tom Hudson would assume the role and title of Managing Editor, in addition to his current on-air duties.

In November 2011, Rick Ray succeeded Kontilai as chief executive officer of NBR Worldwide, Inc. after Kontilai sold the company to Atalaya Capital Management, a private equity firm based out of NYC. In addition, he also became the new executive producer of NBR. Gary Ferrell also departed the company at this time. Several additional members of the editorial staff were also fired. In addition, the show returned to American Public Television after six years on the PBS schedule.

In December 2012, Atalaya fired another seven NBR editorial employees, including Chicago Bureau Chief Diane Eastabrook. The program also announced the complete closing of its Chicago bureau, leaving it with staff reporters only in New York and Washington, D.C. Of the terminated employees, NBR Managing Editor Tom Hudson said, "I consider it an honor to call them colleagues."

On March 1, 2013, NBR aired its final broadcast under the production of WPBT. Effective March 4, 2013, CNBC would produce NBR. As a result, anchor Tom Hudson and many other correspondents Darren Gersh (Washington DC Bureau Chief) Suzanne Pratt (New York) and Erika Miller (New York) were laid off, and the show's Miami studios were shut down as well. CNBC's Tyler Mathisen replaced Hudson, and anchored alongside Susie Gharib from CNBC Global Headquarters in Englewood Cliffs, New Jersey. Gharib left NBR at the end of 2014 and was replaced with Sue Herera, who was previously Mathisen's co-anchor on CNBC's Power Lunch; Herera would remain with the program until a few weeks before it ended. On March 12, 2018, Bill Griffeth, formerly co-anchor of CNBC's Closing Bell, joined NBR to replace Tyler Mathisen. Griffeth was reunited with his former Power Lunch co-anchor, Sue Herera, on this program.

On November 11, 2019, CNBC announced that NBR would air its last broadcast on December 27, 2019. At the end of that night's broadcast, Griffeth made an on-air announcement of the program's end, thanking both the public television community and viewers for their support (and ending the program's long run by paying homage to longtime anchor Paul Kangas [who had died two years earlier] by playing a clip of his "Best of good buys(pun on goodbyes)" sign-off; the text was an adaptation of a post at the NBR website made earlier that day. After the show was closed, many stations displace the series by simulcasts of BBC World News, specifically the Outside Source program.

== Anchors ==
=== Miami ===
- Paul Kangas (1979–2009)
- Tom Hudson (2009–2013)
- Merwin Sigale (1979–1980)
- Del Frank (1980–1985)
- Jim Wicks (1989–1991)
- Frank Mottek (1989–1992)
- Linda O'Bryon (1979–2006)
- Dean Shepherd (1985–1988)
- Jeff Yastine (1993–2010)

=== New York ===
- Susie Gharib (1998–2014)
- Sue Herera (2015–2019)
- Bill Griffeth (2018–2019)
- Suzanne Pratt (1990–2013)
- Tyler Mathisen (2013–2018)
- Cassie Seifert (1991–1997)
- Scott Gurvey (1982–2010)
- Erika Miller (1996–2013)

== Title cards and theme music ==
The themes and bumper music that were used from 1979 to 1991 were composed by Edd Kalehoff, also known for themes on other television series and game shows. The longest-running theme, also composed by Kalehoff, was used from January 7, 1991, to November 15, 2002. Along with an update to the graphics and presentation, the theme was updated on November 18, 2002, and was used until January 1, 2010. A new theme, logo, and set for the show's Miami headquarters debuted on January 4, 2010. This theme lasted until April 27, 2012. On April 30, 2012, a new virtual theme was introduced to the show with new graphics and music. On March 4, 2013, another new set of graphics was introduced, yet the theme music remained the same. On January 4, 2016, the graphics were changed again; this time they were modeled after CNBC's current graphics package (which itself had been used since October 2014).
