= David Faber (journalist) =

American journalist

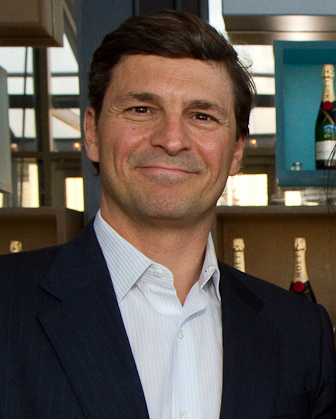
- Faber at the Financial Times Spring Party in 2012
- Born: March 10, 1964 (age 62); New York City, U.S
- Education: Tufts University, English major
- Occupation: Business journalist
- Notable credit: Squawk on the Street
- Spouse: Jenny Harris (m. 2000)
- Website: www.cnbc.com/david-faber/

David H. Faber (/ˈfeɪbər/; born March 10, 1964) is an American financial journalist and market news analyst for the television cable network CNBC. He is currently one of the co-hosts of CNBC's morning show Squawk on the Street.

== Career ==
Faber joined CNBC in 1993 after seven years at Institutional Investor. He has been dubbed "The Brain" by CNBC co-workers, and has hosted several documentaries on corporations, such as Wal-Mart and eBay. The Age of Walmart earned Faber a 2005 Peabody Award and an Alfred I. duPont-Columbia University Award for Broadcast Journalism. In 2010, he shared the Gerald Loeb Award for Television Enterprise business journalism for "House of Cards." On Wednesday, September 17, 2023, Faber celebrated working 30 years at CNBC.

In addition to Squawk on the Street, Faber hosts the network's monthly program, Business Nation, which debuted on January 24, 2007.

Faber is the author of three books: The Faber Report (2002), And Then the Roof Caved In (2009), and House of Cards: The Origins of the Collapse (2010).

Faber served as a guest host on Jeopardy! from August 2–6, 2021. He was the champion of Celebrity Jeopardy! in 2012.

== Personal life ==
Faber is Jewish and was raised in Queens, New York. He is a 1985 cum laude graduate of Tufts University, where he earned a Bachelor of Arts degree in English.

In 2000, Faber married Jenny Harris, a business journalist and television producer.

== See also ==
- New Yorkers in journalism
