= CNBC =

American business news channel

- Logo used since 2025
- Country: United States
- Broadcast area: United States, Canada, worldwide
- Headquarters: Englewood Cliffs, New Jersey, U.S. 40°53′55″N 73°56′21″W

Programming
- Language: English
- Picture format: 1080i HDTV

Ownership
- Owner: Versant
- Sister channels: CNBC World; MS NOW; USA Network; Golf Channel; Syfy; E!; Oxygen; CNBC-e (Turkey)

History
- Launched: April 17, 1989; 37 years ago
- Replaced: Satellite Program Network; Financial News Network

Links
- Website: cnbc.com

Availability

Streaming media
- CNBC Pro: CNBC Pro (requires subscription)
- ClaroTV+: (requires subscription to access content): ch.725
- Service(s): DirecTV Stream, Hulu + Live TV, Sling TV, YouTube TV

The Consumer News and Business Channel (CNBC) is an American business news channel owned by Versant. The network broadcasts live business news and analysis programming during the morning, daytime business day, and early-evening hours, with the remaining hours (such as weekday prime time and weekends) filled by business-related documentaries and reality television programming, as well as occasional sports presentations from USA Sports (previously served by NBC Sports). CNBC operates an accompanying financial news website, CNBC.com, which includes news articles, video and podcast content, as well as subscription-based services. CNBC's headquarters and main studios are located in Englewood Cliffs, New Jersey, while it also maintains a studio at the Nasdaq MarketSite in Times Square, New York City, it also broadcasts shows directly from the floor of the New York Stock Exchange.

== History ==
=== SPN, the launch of CNBC, and early years (1979–1993) ===
CNBC's roots date back to the founding of the Satellite Program Network (SPN) on July 30, 1979, which showed a low-budget mix of old movies and instructional and entertainment programs. The channel later changed its name to Tempo Television. After initially signing a letter of intent to acquire Tempo, National Broadcasting Company (a.k.a. NBC; parent company of the eponymous NBC TV network) opted for a deal to lease the channel's transponder in June 1988. On this platform, and under the guidance of Tom Rogers, the channel was relaunched on April 17, 1989, as the Consumer News and Business Channel, with Neil Cavuto anchoring this first broadcast. NBC and Cablevision initially operated CNBC as a 50–50 joint venture, and it was headquartered in Fort Lee, New Jersey. Sue Herera and Scott Cohn joined CNBC at its inception.

CNBC's original logo

External videos
- CNBC's Inaugural Broadcast, archived by CNBC on YouTube. The Consumer News and Business Channel launches on April 17, 1989 with then-NBC president Bob Wright.

Following the 1991 bankruptcy of the competing Financial News Network (FNN), NBC acquired and merged FNN into CNBC, while also acquiring Cablevision's stake in CNBC to grant it full ownership. In addition to its U.S. operations, CNBC operates the Europe and Asia branches and is involved in other international affiliates via joint ventures and franchise arrangements. In 2023, CNBC had higher total day and primetime viewership than its chief rival, Fox Business, but finished behind Fox in trading day viewership.

CNBC had considerable difficulty getting cable carriage at first, as many providers were skeptical of placing it alongside the longer-established Financial News Network. By the winter of 1990, CNBC was in only 17 million homes—less than half of FNN's potential reach—despite the size of NBC, its parent.

After an accounting scandal, FNN filed for bankruptcy protection on March 2, 1991, and put itself up for sale. After a bidding war with a Dow Jones & Company–Westinghouse Broadcasting consortium, CNBC was awarded FNN by a bankruptcy judge for $154.3 million on May 21, 1991, and merged the two operations. CNBC hired around 60 of FNN's 300-person workforce, including Joe Kernen, who is still with the channel. Other former FNN workers were hired by Bloomberg Television. The deal expanded the network's distribution to over 40 million homes, thereby more than doubling its potential audience. Cablevision sold its 49.5% stake in CNBC to NBC upon completion of the deal. CNBC adopted many elements of FNN's on-air presentation, branding its daytime programming as "CNBC/FNN Daytime" until 1992. CNBC incorporated several features from FNN's on-air ticker into its own.

=== Expansion (1993–2013) ===
Roger Ailes was hired as the president of CNBC in August 1993, tasked by NBC CEO Bob Wright with turning around the struggling network. Ailes resigned in January 1996 due to disagreements with management, including the decision by NBC management to form a joint venture with Microsoft that included the rebrand of "America's Talking" as MSNBC. Under the leadership of Ailes, annual revenue at CNBC rose from $43 million to $110 million.

In June 1995, CNBC launched the Hong Kong–based CNBC Asia, and CNBC Europe, headquartered in London, in March 1996.

The CNBC logo from 1996 to 2023. It is based on the 1986 NBC logo.

In December 1997, CNBC formed a strategic alliance with Dow Jones, including content sharing with Dow Jones Newswires, The Wall Street Journal, MarketWatch, and Barron's and the rebranding of the channel as "a service of NBC and Dow Jones." As part of the agreement, Dow Jones merged their competing business news channels—London-based European Business News and Singapore-based Asia Business News—into CNBC Europe and CNBC Asia, respectively, with CNBC shutting down its Hong Kong–based operation and relocating the new CNBC Asia to ABN's Singapore studios.

During the late 1990s and early 2000s, CNBC's ratings increased sharply along with the stock market, often beating those of CNN during market hours. The highest daytime viewership of the network in 2000 was 343,000.

However, following the burst of the dot-com bubble, CNBC experienced a decline in its viewing figures. In 2002, CNBC's ratings fell 44% and were down another 5% in 2003. The network's ratings steadily fell until bottoming in Q1 2005, with an average viewership of 134,000 during the day.

From 2001 to 2006, the CNBC website was operated by MSN.

In August 2003, CNBC signed a deal to provide weather content from AccuWeather.

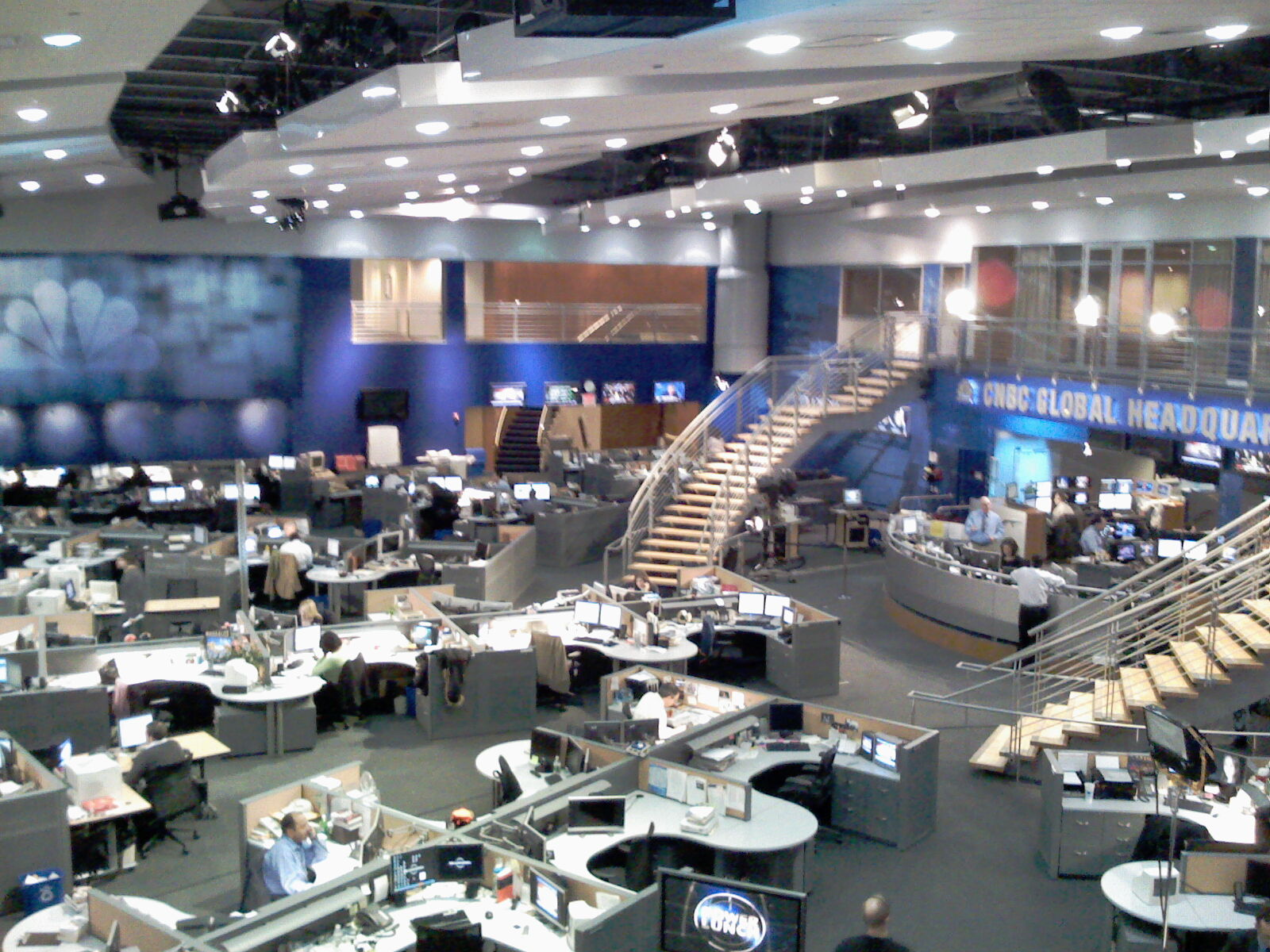
CNBC Global Headquarters in 2008

In October 2003, CNBC moved its world headquarters from Fort Lee (which became the new home of Telemundo flagship station WNJU) to a new digital video production studio in Englewood Cliffs, New Jersey.

NBC Universal reacquired full control of loss-making CNBC Europe and CNBC Asia from Dow Jones at the end of 2005. The licensing agreement between Dow and CNBC U.S. remained intact until it expired in 2012.

CNBC reported annual revenues of $510 million in 2006. In September 2006, CNBC launched the FTSE CNBC Global 300 stock market index in conjunction with FTSE Group. The index includes the fifteen largest companies from each of the sectors of the Industry Classification Benchmark as well as the thirty largest companies from emerging markets. Profits at CNBC exceeded $333 million in 2007, making CNBC the second most profitable of NBC Universal's thirteen cable channels in the United States, behind only the USA Network. Ratings hit an all-time high in 2007.

CNBC Africa was launched on June 1, 2007. On October 22, 2007, CNBC introduced the "CNBC Investor Network," a network of webcams stationed in the operating departments of various independent financial institutions across the United States, allowing traders to be interviewed instantaneously as news breaks. In December 2007, CNBC formed a content partnership with Yahoo! Finance.

In January 2008, CNBC formed a content partnership with The New York Times, which was seen as an attempt by both parties to take on increased competition from News Corporation. In May 2008, CNBC formed a content partnership with AOL.

Average daytime viewership (6:00 a.m. to 6:00 p.m.) reached a seven-year high of 310,000 viewers in the first quarter of 2008. Ratings plummeted in 2009 as the network aired bad economic news resulting from the Great Recession. In January 2010, the launch of the Korean language channel SBS-CNBC marked the fifteenth CNBC-branded channel worldwide. In July 2010, BT signed a five-year contract with CNBC Europe to distribute content from its London headquarters to sister sites in Europe and the US.

In 2011, CNBC won an award at the International Broadcasting Convention for its CNBC 4D: Interactive motion tracking that allows CNBC presenters to interact with 3D graphics, using technology from Unreel, Brainstorm, and Motion Analysis. In June 2012, CNBC expanded its partnership with Yahoo! Finance to reach more online viewers. That month, CNBC.com had 6.5 million unique visitors in the United States, while Yahoo! Finance had 37.5 million.

=== Rise in competition (2013–2024) ===
In 2013, host Maria Bartiromo left CNBC for Fox Business in part because Fox offered her $5–6 million per year compared to the $4 million per year that she made at CNBC. Also that year, CNBC took over production of the popular public television program Nightly Business Report from NBR Worldwide, a subsidiary of Atalaya Global Management.

The company publishes annual lists, including the CNBC Disruptor 50 since 2013 and the CNBC25 since 2014.

On January 6, 2015, CNBC changed the way it calculates ratings, switching from Nielsen ratings to a system by Cogent Research to calculate the viewership of its business day programming by surveying financial advisers and investors, with the goal of providing a more accurate measurement of the network's out-of-home viewership; Nielsen is still used to track the viewership of its entertainment programming.

In October 2015, a Republican Party candidates debate hosted by CNBC was seen by 14 million viewers—the highest viewership of a CNBC program to date.

On January 10, 2016, CNBC announced a partnership with Indonesian media company Trans Media to form CNBC Indonesia.

By 2017, Fox Business had overtaken CNBC as the most watched business news network during the day.

CNBC's online video operations generated an all-time high of 1.92 billion total digital video starts across platforms in 2020.

In 2020, CNBC hired former Fox News Channel anchor Shepard Smith to host a new evening newscast on the channel, The News with Shepard Smith, which premiered that September. It was positioned as an objective, "fact-based" national newscast.

In September 2021, CNBC signed a new multi-platform deal with Jim Cramer; in addition to his existing television roles, the agreement includes the co-development of live events and digital content through his company Cramer Media (replacing his previous arrangement with TheStreet, which Cramer had co-founded and sold to The Arena Group in 2019), including a direct-to-consumer subscription service. In January 2022, the subscription service launched as the "CNBC Investing Club with Jim Cramer," which includes commentaries, stock picks, and monthly online meetings. The service operates alongside another CNBC subscription service, "CNBC Pro," which similarly provides exclusive content and over-the-top streaming of CNBC's networks.

In August 2022, Mark Hoffman stepped down as president of CNBC after 17 years at the network, being succeeded by NBCUniversal president of global advertising and partnerships KC Sullivan. Under Sullivan, the network began to refocus its programming to broaden appeal to its core business audience, including a promise of more business-related documentaries in primetime, and cancelling the low-rated The News with Shepard Smith in November 2022 in favor of the new financial news program Last Call with Brian Sullivan, which premiered in January 2023, and ran until July 18, 2024.

On December 11, 2023, CNBC underwent a major rebranding, updating its logo for the first time since 1996 (adopting the updated NBC logo and corporate typeface introduced a year prior in the process), and revamping its on-air graphics with a simpler flat design. The two-tiered stock ticker CNBC had historically used was replaced with a single scroll, with major indices now displayed in a strip below the stock ticker.

In March 2024, CNBC announced plans to add its personal finance brand "Make It" to weekend programming. Make It offers personal finance tips, career guidance, and other forms of advice-based content to consumers. According to CNBC, Make It-branded content (which launched in 2016) forms CNBC.com’s largest vertical.

In April 2024, CNBC celebrated its 35th anniversary with a ceremony at the New York Stock Exchange.

In November 2024, a Brazilian affiliate known as Times Brasil launched as CNBC's first local franchise in South America. It was founded by Douglas Tavolaro, who had originally founded CNN Brasil.

=== Spin-off from NBCUniversal (2024–present) ===
The final logo of CNBC's NBCUniversal era. It is based on the 2022 NBC logo.

On November 20, 2024, NBCUniversal announced its intent to spin off most of its cable networks, including CNBC, as a new publicly traded company controlled by Comcast shareholders, later known as Versant. CNBC had largely operated autonomously from NBC News until Cesar Conde became head of the NBCUniversal News Group in 2020, after which the network began to engage in some resource sharing with the division.

In 2025, CNBC launched a new subscription streaming platform known as CNBC+, which offers live and on-demand streaming of CNBC and CNBC World programming. Bundles of the service with CNBC Pro and an "all-access" tier with CNBC Investing Club are also available.

Due to the spin-off, it was announced on August 18, 2025, that CNBC would undergo a rebranding to reduce its ties to the NBC brand. The channel would retain the "CNBC" name (unlike sister network MSNBC, which underwent a more significant rebrand to "MS NOW"), but adopt a new logo excluding the NBC peacock symbol. Versant head Mark Lazarus acknowledged that CNBC would be able to keep its name since it was originally an initialism for "Consumer News and Business Channel"; Versant still had to obtain a trademark license from NBCUniversal to continue using "NBC" as part of CNBC's name.

In October 2025, both CNBC and MSNBC began the process of formally separating themselves from NBC News, ahead of the completion of the divestment in 2026. CNBC unveiled its new logo in December 2025, which took effect on-air on December 13; it is designed around motifs originally introduced in the 2023 rebranding (including its neon blue corporate color, right triangle icons, and its associated on-air graphics—which were maintained with the rebranding), while also including visual references to CNBC's original wordmark (including tight kerning on the "N" and "B," albeit connected by a right triangle in negative space).

== Physical stores ==
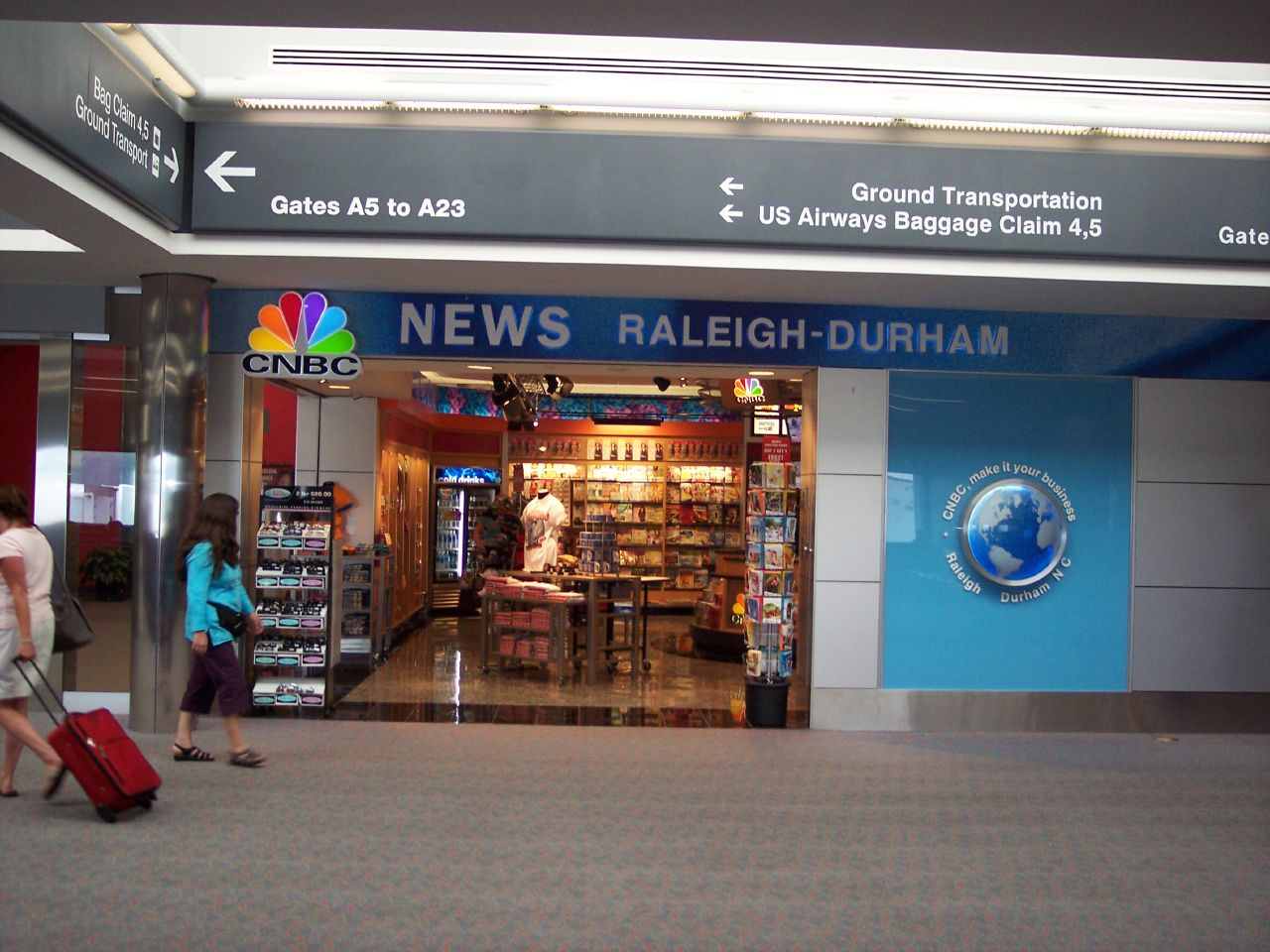
CNBC News Store at Raleigh–Durham International Airport

CNBC has a licensing partnership with Paradies Lagardère to operate retail locations in United States airports branded as CNBC News, CNBC Express, and CNBC SmartShop. The stores sell CNBC-branded merchandise as well as snacks and drinks.

The CNBC stores first launched in 2001, when the company announced plans to open as many as 100 airport shops in the United States. As of 2024, CNBC airport stores continue to expand, with a Pensacola International Airport location unveiled in Florida that November.

== Criticism ==
CNBC has been criticized for allegedly amplifying bull and bear markets, particularly in the run-up to the dot-com bubble and the subprime mortgage crisis a decade later. In response to these criticisms, CNBC anchors have pointed to the size of the market and noted that influencing it is "a little out of our reach."

Jon Stewart on Comedy Central's The Daily Show has been a vocal critic of CNBC and some of its personalities, beginning after comments were made by Rick Santelli. Despite the lack of direct feedback from the network, several personalities have defended their predictions and comments.

CNBC was accused by the Obama administration of "cable chatter"—the excessive and sometimes brutal discussion on a particular topic, often one-sided.

=== Performance of Jim Cramer's stock picks ===
Regarding CNBC's Mad Money host Jim Cramer, a 2007 article in Barron's stated that "his picks haven't beaten the market. Over the past two years, viewers holding Cramer's stocks would be up 12%, while the Dow rose 22% and the S&P 500 16%."

== High definition ==
CNBC HD on April 9, 2014

On October 10, 2007, CNBC HD, a 1080i high-definition television simulcast of CNBC, was launched, first on DirecTV.

On October 13, 2014, coincidentally the 11th anniversary of CNBC's relocation to its current facilities in Englewood Cliffs, NJ, CNBC switched to a full 16:9 letterbox presentation, in line with CNBC Asia and CNBC Europe.

== Gallery ==
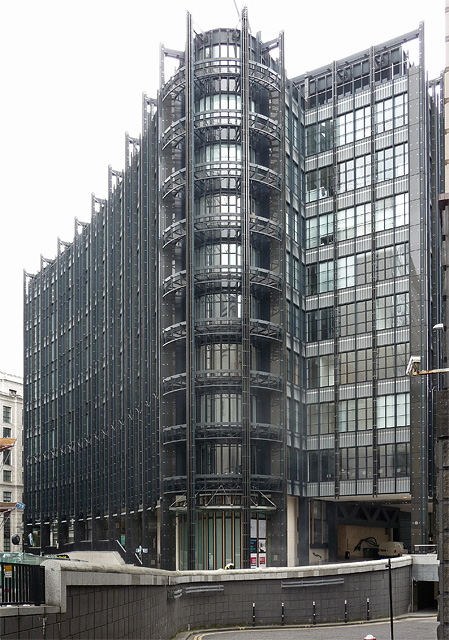
CNBC Europe's headquarters in 10 Fleet Place, London

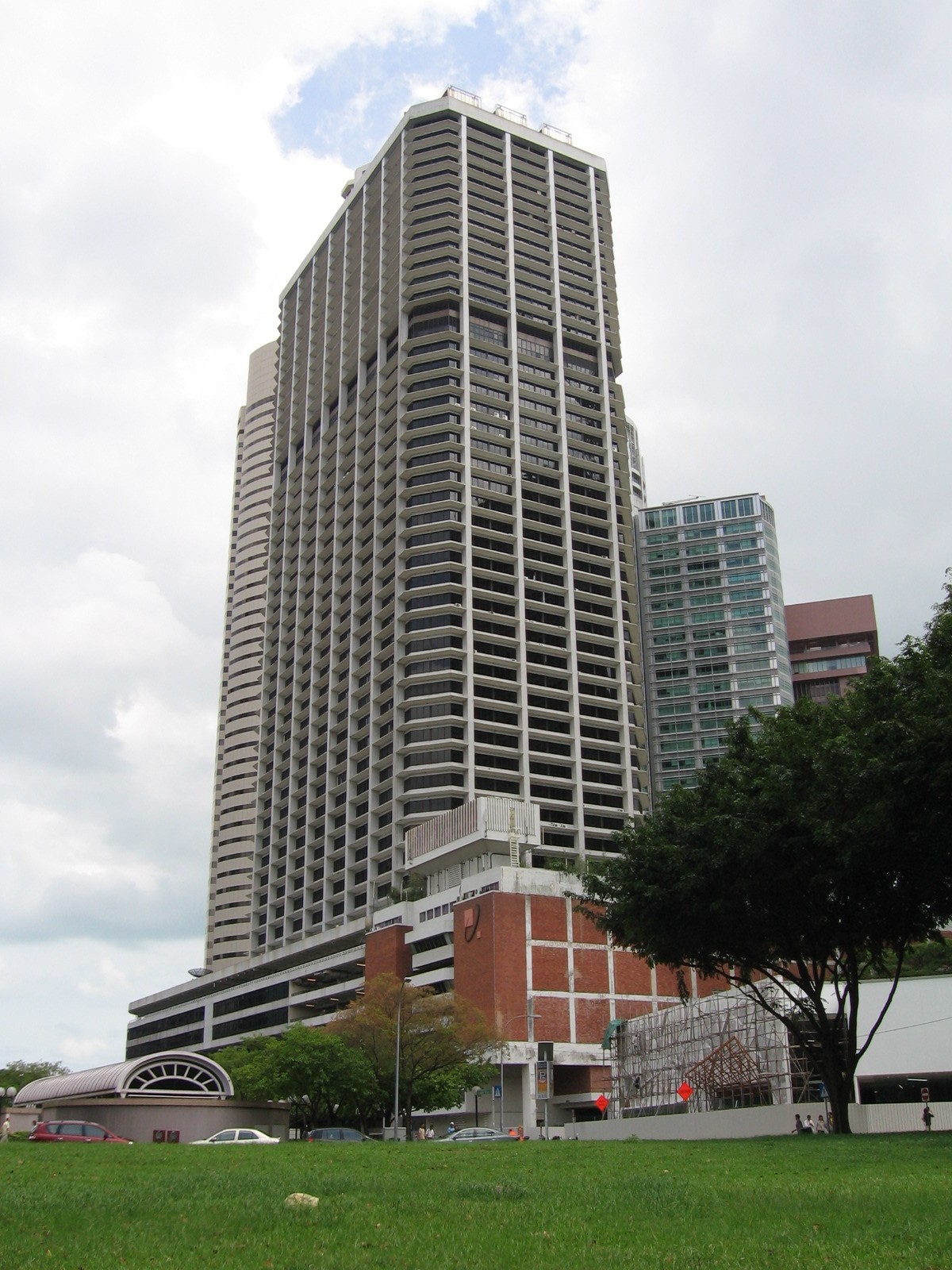
CNBC Asia's former headquarters in International Plaza, Singapore, moved to Mapletree Business City in 2023

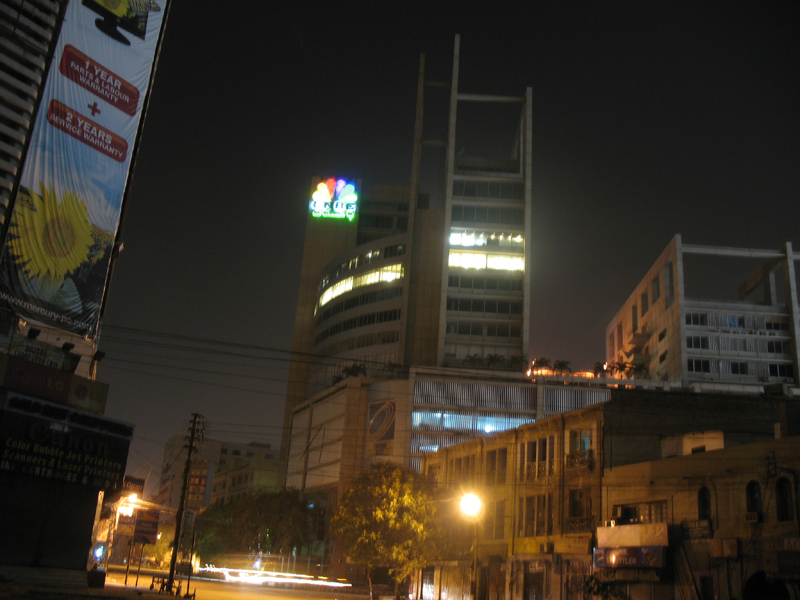
CNBC Pakistan's headquarters at night in Karachi

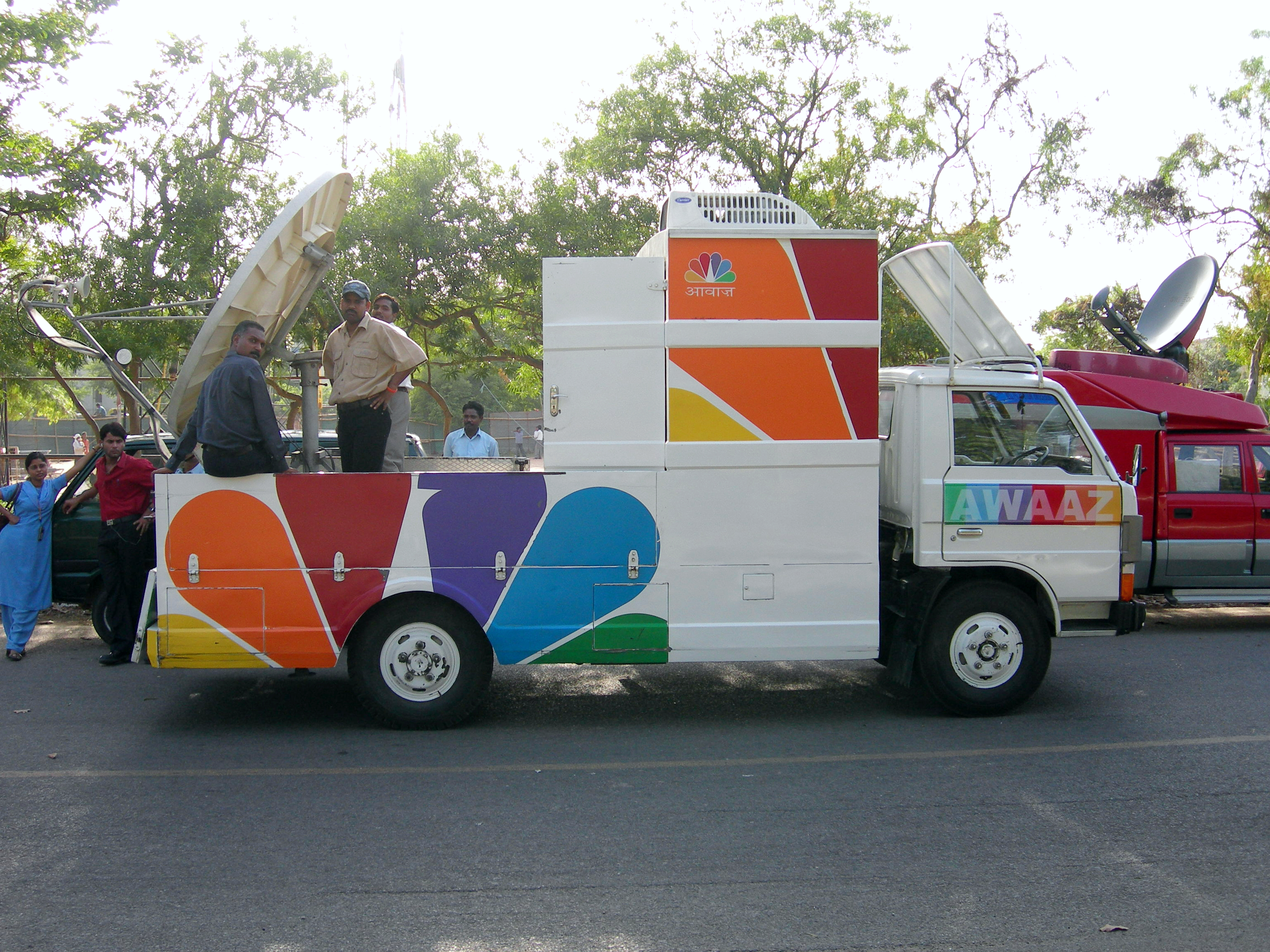
CNBC Awaaz News Van

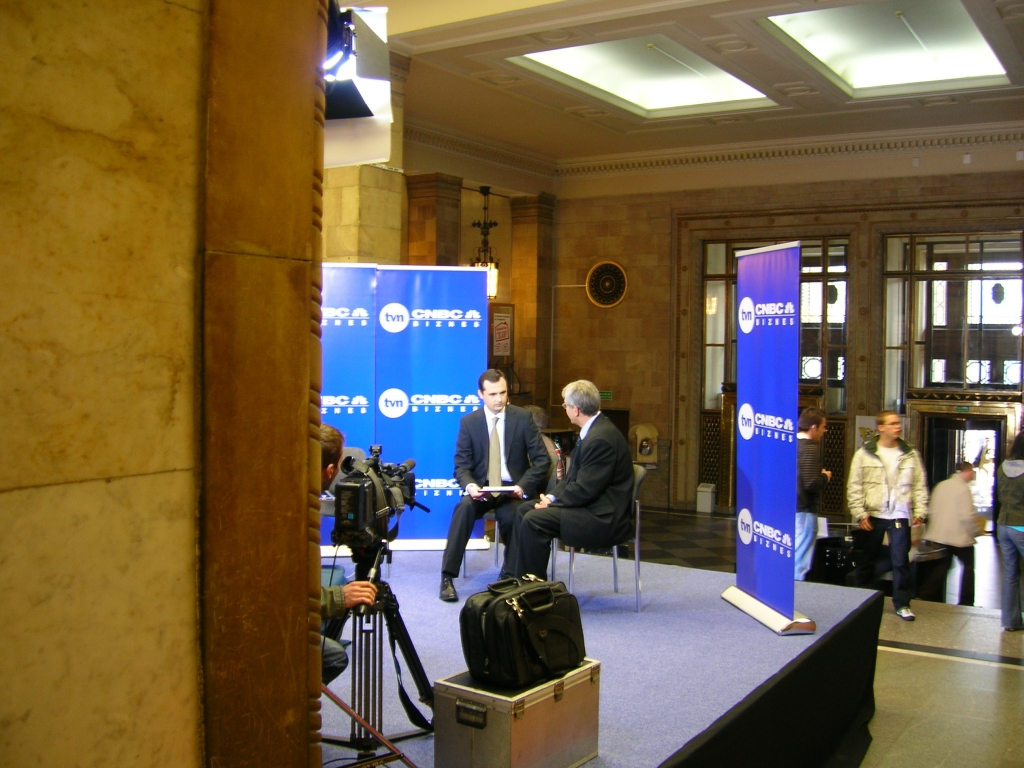
TVN CNBC Biznes interview

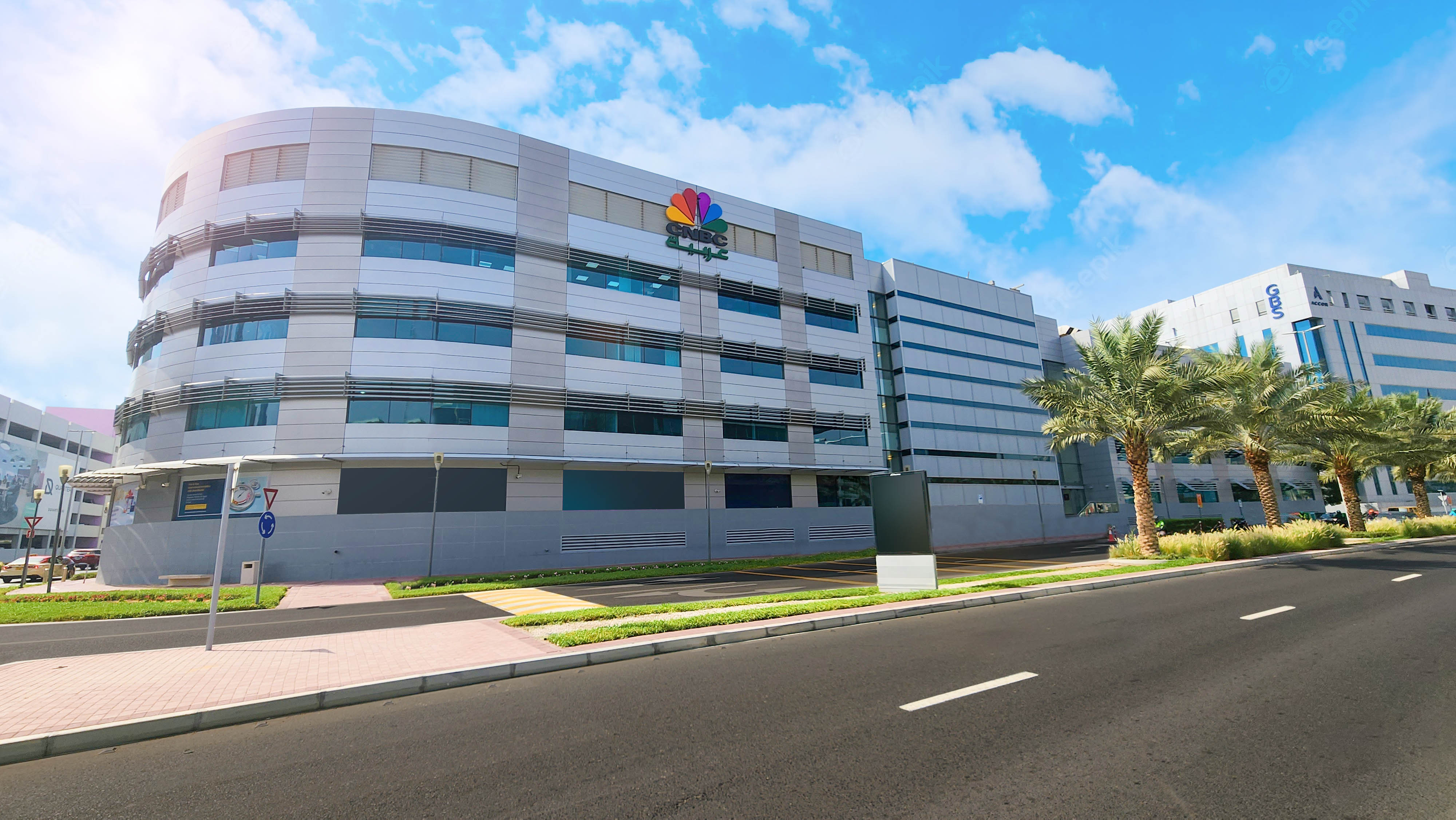
CNBC Arabia - Dubai HQ

== Programming ==
Current notable programming (as of April 2026):

- Closing Bell: Scott Wapner
- Closing Bell: Overtime: Melissa Lee, Michael Santoli
- Fast Money: Frank Holland (host), Guy Adami, Tim Seymour, and Karen Finerman (panelists)
- Halftime Report: Scott Wapner
- Mad Money: Jim Cramer
- Morning Call: Morgan Brennan
- Power Lunch: Kelly Evans and Brian Sullivan
- Squawk Box: Joe Kernen, Rebecca Quick, and Andrew Ross Sorkin
- Squawk Box Europe: Steve Sedgwick, Ben Boulos and Karen Tso (produced by CNBC Europe; final hour only)
- Squawk on the Street: Carl Quintanilla, David Faber, Sara Eisen, and Jim Cramer
- The Exchange: Kelly Evans

=== Non-business-programming, including Reality television ===
- American Greed
- Blue Collar Millionaires
- Business Nation, anchored by award-winning journalist David Faber. Each edition of the program covers three stories: a mixture of profiles, investigative pieces, and features. The format of the show is structured similarly to HBO's Real Sports.
- Cleveland Hustles
- CNBC on Assignment (for example, The Age of Wal-Mart)
- Cover to Cover
- Dateline (aired during the overnight hours on Tuesday through Saturday)
- Jay Leno's Garage
- Restaurant Startup
- Secret Lives of the Super Rich
- Staten Island Hustle, a revival of former NBC game show Deal or No Deal
- The Car Chasers
- The News with Shepard Smith, described as being "non-partisan" and "fact-based".
- The Partner
- The Profit
- Shark Tank
- The Suze Orman Show
- Trash Inc: The Secret Life of Garbage (2010)
- Treasure Detectives
- West Texas Investors Club

=== Sports ===
CNBC occasionally serves as an outlet for NBC Sports programming and essentially acts as an overflow feed when USA Network is broadcasting sports events. Mainly, this has occurred on weekends, especially in the afternoon, and sports coverage is purposefully kept away from any part of the American trading day on weekdays.

Sports programming that have aired on CNBC includes the AMA Supercross Championship, College Football, cycling (including portions of the Tour de France, Formula 1, Golf, Thoroughbred Racing (including portions of the Royal Ascot, IMSA, IndyCar, Major League Baseball studio coverage, NASCAR, National Hockey Leagues (including games from the Stanley Cup playoffs), the Olympics, the Premier Lacrosse League, Six Nations Championship Rugby, soccer (including matches from the Premier League and Women's Super League), and the United States Football League.

Under Versant, CNBC has added college basketball and Babe Ruth League baseball coverage from USA Sports.

=== Notable former programming ===
==== Weekly, weekend and other programming ====
- American Le Mans Series races (inaugural 1999 season only, as part of agreement with NBC Sports)
- Champions Tour golf (moved to Golf Channel)
- CNET
- DLife: Your Diabetes Show (2005–2013, using weekend paid programming time)
- Last Call (cancelled July 18, 2024)
- Louis Rukeyser's Wall Street (ended its run on December 31, 2004, at Louis Rukeyser's request due to illness)
- Market Watch
- Market Week with Maria Bartiromo (renamed After Hours with Maria Bartiromo and then Special Report with Maria Bartiromo, cancelled in 2004)
- National Geographic Explorer (moved to MSNBC and then to the National Geographic Channel)
- Nightly Business Report, a 30-minute weeknight business newscast hosted by Sue Herera and Bill Griffeth and distributed to U.S. public television stations. Launched in 1979, CNBC assumed production of the series in 2013 and ended it in December 2019.
- On the Money, originally launched in 1970 as The Wall Street Journal Report, ended production in December 2019
- Real Personal
- Squawk Alley
- TechCheck
- The Big Idea with Donny Deutsch
- The Charles Grodin Show (moved to MSNBC in 1998)
- The Dick Cavett Show
- The McLaughlin Group
- The Suze Orman Show
- Tim Russert
- Tom Snyder
- Topic [A] with Tina Brown
- Ushuaia
- Weekend Squawk Box
- Worldwide Exchange

==== Non-business programming ====
- 1 vs. 100
- Deal or No Deal
- Dennis Miller
- Late Night with Conan O'Brien
- The Apprentice
  - The Apprentice: Martha Stewart

== See also ==
- CNBC Ticker
- List of CNBC personalities
