= Asian Americans in U.S. broadcast journalism =

Asian-American broadcast journalists emerged in the 1970s with local TV news stations in regions with high Asian American urban populations such as the Los Angeles metro area and San Francisco Bay Area in California; Seattle, Washington; and the New York City metropolitan area. National TV network news anchors Ken Kashiwahara and Connie Chung rose to prominence in the 1970s and 1980s, resulting in high visibility. With the development of international business cable news broadcasting, especially for broadcast from East Asia, the careers of many Asian American broadcast news journalist has seen a large growth of opportunities.

== 1950s ==
The first Asian-American radio anchor was Sam Chu Lin in 1956 for the radio station WJPR.

== 1960s ==
Mario Machado, with KNXT (Los Angeles), was the first Asian-American radio-television reporter in 1967. He was also a sportscaster and consumer affairs reporter.

In 1968, David Louie was the first television news reporter as a reporter for KGO.

== 1970s ==
One of the first Asian Americans to appear on a United States national network was Ken Kashiwahara, who was a correspondent from 1974 to 1998.

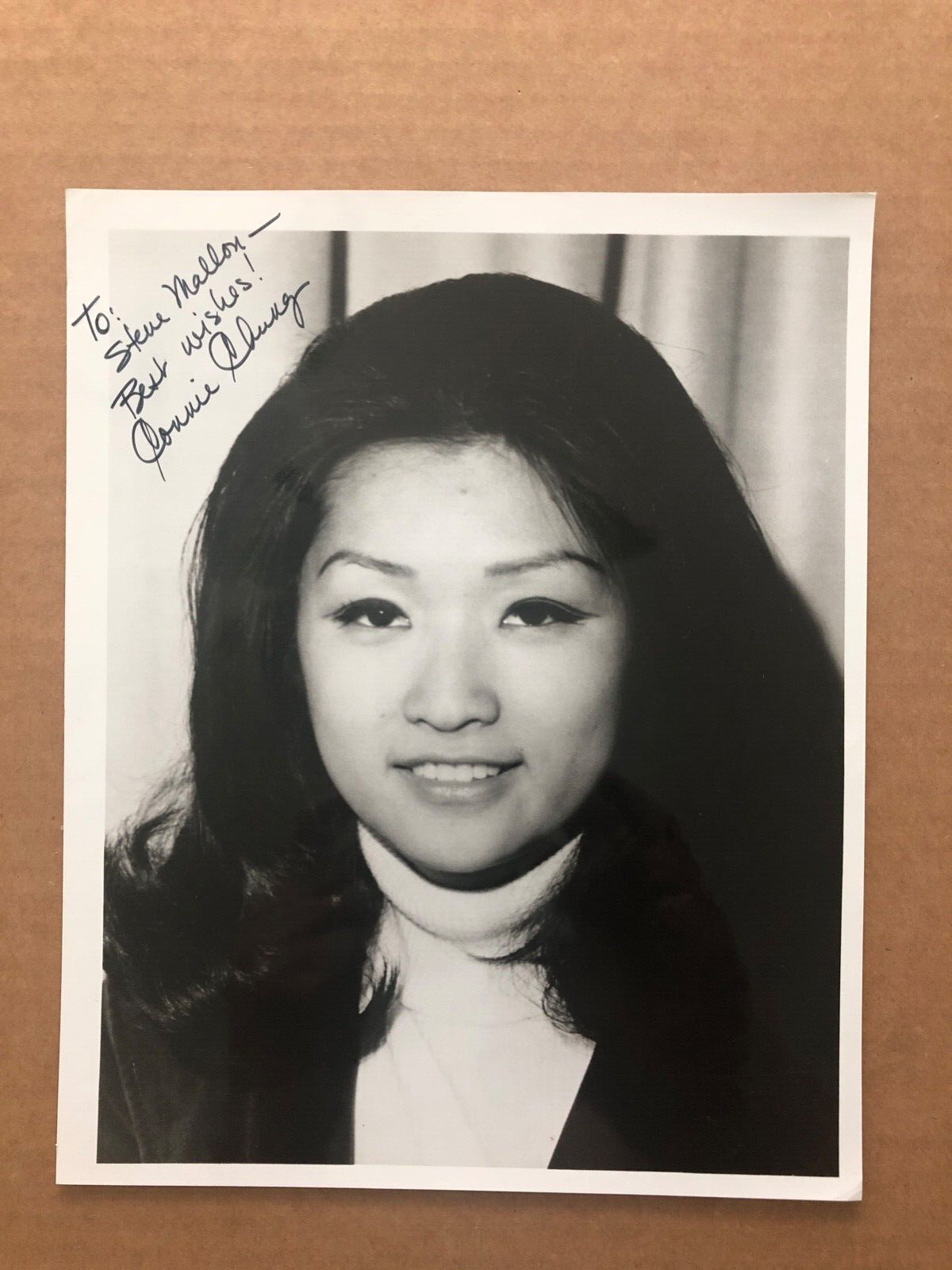
Connie Chung (1977)

Connie Chung led the way for future Asian-American woman journalists as a reporter on network news from the 1970s to 2006. She started with coverage of the Watergate trial in the early 1970s and later did the short news announcements between evening television programs for West Coast CBS television stations in a segment called CBS Newbreak, which were broadcast from Los Angeles. She would go on to anchor the CBS Evening News (1989-1993). She was the second woman to co-anchor a major network's national weekday news broadcast after Barbara Walters.

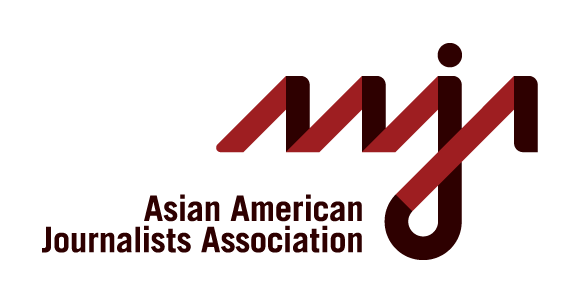
The Asian American Journalists Association logo

== 1980s ==
In 1983, the Asian American Journalists Association was created.

== 1990s ==
Joie Chen, when she was with CNN from 1991 to 2001, was the first Asian American to anchor a primetime news hour on cable television. She is currently a senior advisor and Faculty member at the Poynter Institute for Media Studies.

== 2000s ==
In 2002, Haslinda Amin joined Bloomberg Television and is presently a television anchor as well as Chief International Correspondent for Southeast Asia. She hosts High Flyers, which is broadcast from Singapore and has been nominated for Best Talk Show at the Asian Television Awards.

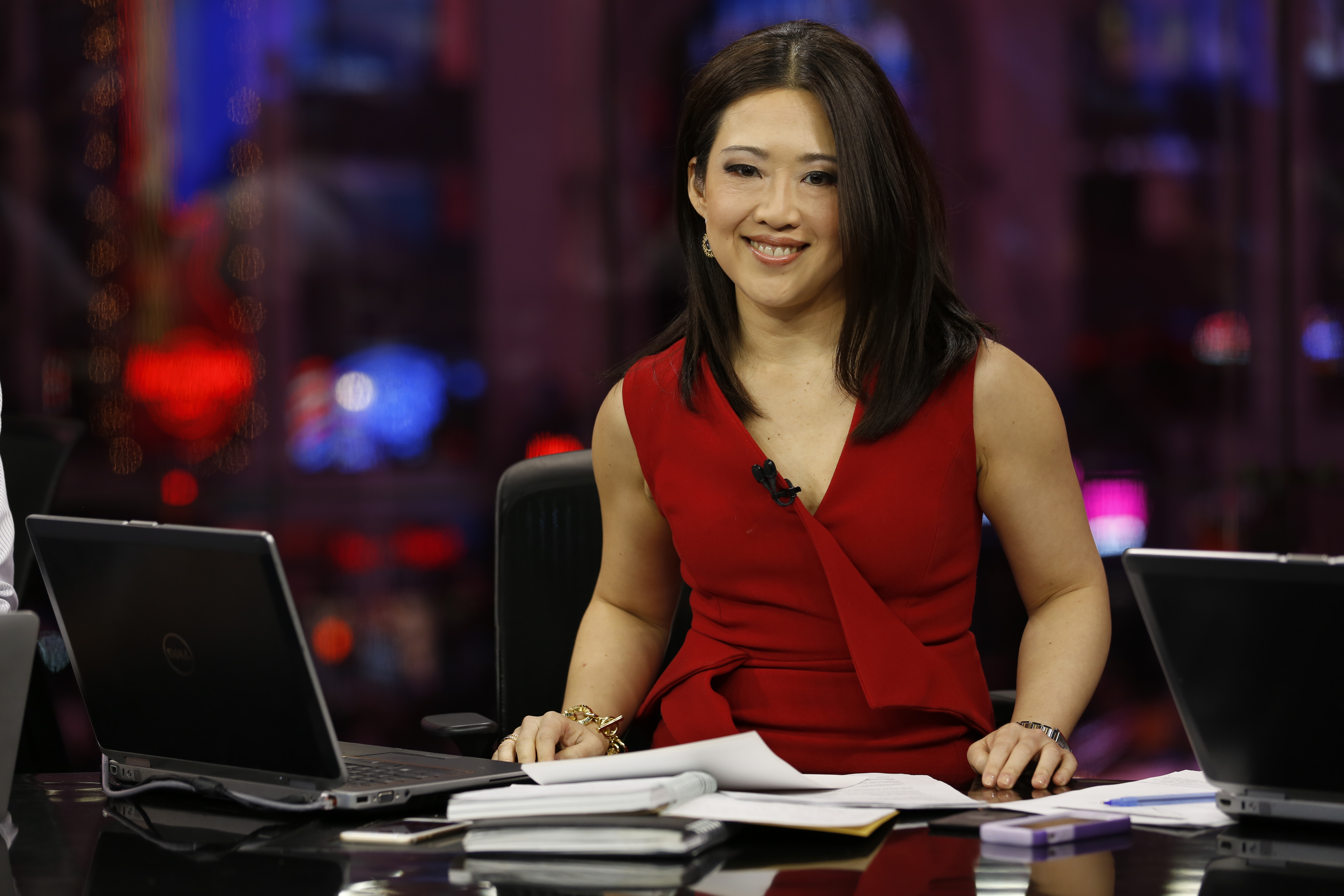
Melissa Lee (2015)

In 2004, Melissa Lee joined the CNBC business news network. She hosts the talk show Fast Money, which is broadcast every business day. She won the 2010 Gracie Award for Outstanding Host-News for the network's broadcast of the special report Is Your Money Safe?.

Starting in 2007 on Bloomberg Television, Scarlett Fu continues to this day a television new journalist for the national cable news network. She used to be the co-host of Bloomberg Markets: The Close, which was broadcast every business day.

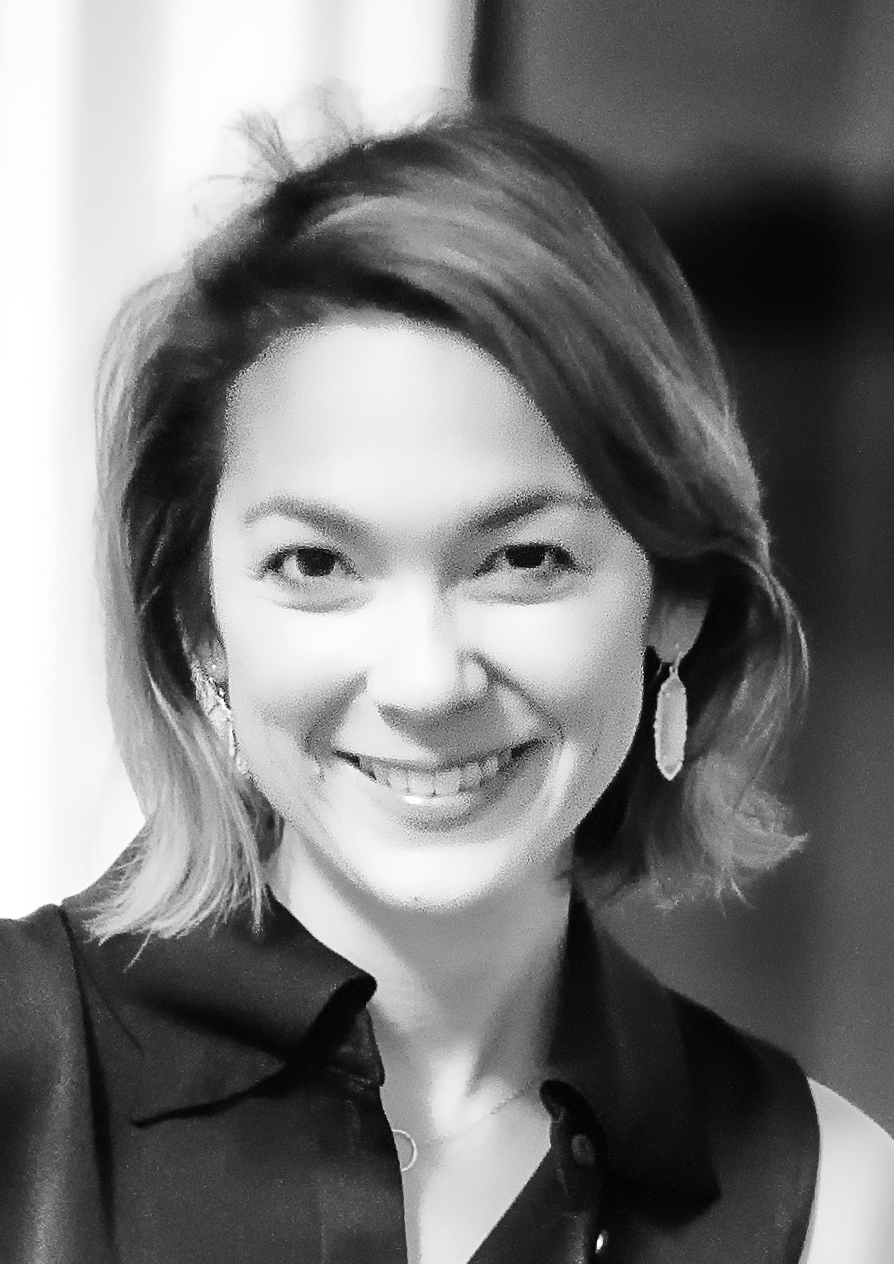
Emily Chang (2015)

Also in 2007, Emily Chang was a CNN international correspondent for Beijing and London from 2007 to 2010. in 2010, she moved to Bloomberg Television where she hosted Bloomberg West, a technology news hour, which was broadcast live from San Francisco. She is also the host of Studio 1.0 , a business news interview television program, which is also from Bloomberg Television.

== 2010s ==
Yvonne Man joined Bloomberg Television in 2014 and presently co-anchors Bloomberg Markets: China Open and Bloomberg Markets: Asia from Bloomberg Television's Asian headquarters in Hong Kong.

Ylan Q. Mui joined CNBC in 2017 and reports on economic regulatory policy from the network's bureau in Washington, DC.

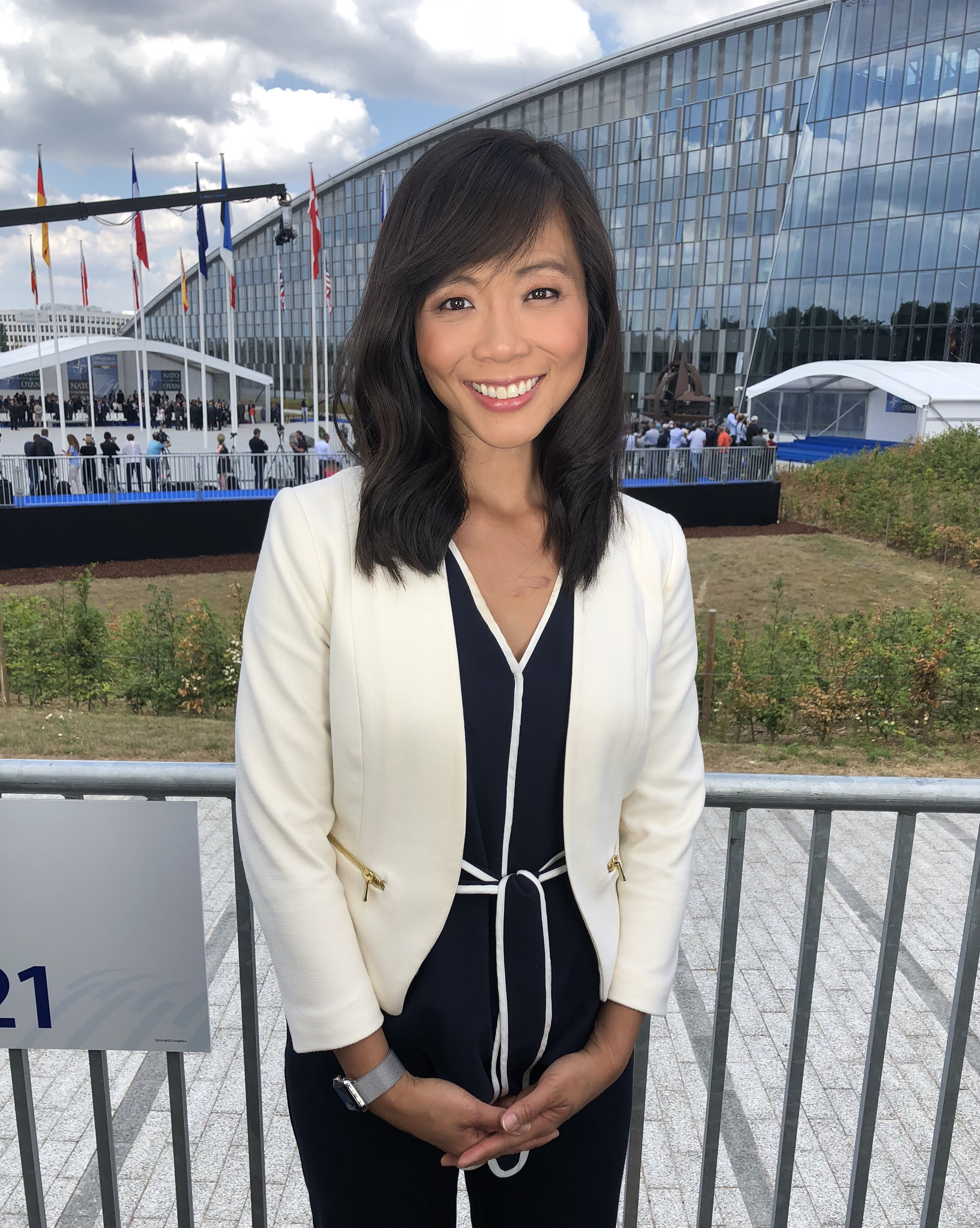
Weijia Jiang (2018)

Weijia Jiang is CBS News‘ Senior White House Correspondent based in Washington, D.C., from 2018 to the present time.

== See also ==
- Asian Americans in arts and entertainment
