= History of Target Corporation =

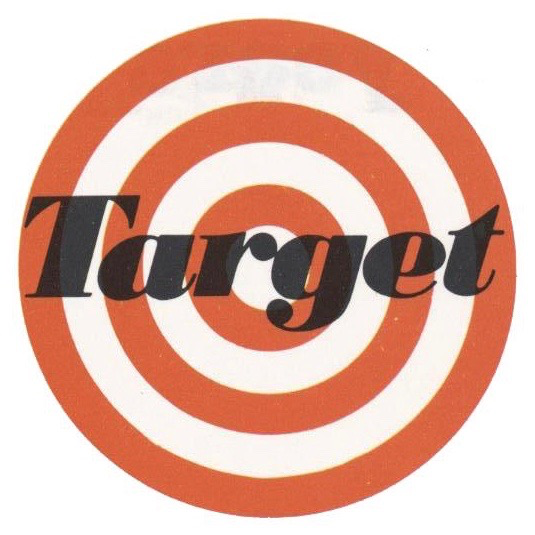
Target's original bullseye logo, used from 1962 until 1968

The history of Target Corporation, an American general merchandise retailer, began in 1902 with George Dayton. The company was originally named Goodfellow Dry Goods in June 1902 before being renamed the Dayton's Dry Goods Company in 1903 and later the Dayton Company in 1910. The first Target store opened in Roseville, Minnesota, in 1962, while the parent company was renamed the Dayton Corporation in 1967. It became the Dayton-Hudson Corporation after merging with the J.L. Hudson Company in 1969 and held ownership of several department store chains including Dayton's, Hudson's, Marshall Field's, and Mervyn's. In 2000, the Dayton-Hudson Corporation was renamed Target Corporation.

== 1902–1961: Dayton Company ==
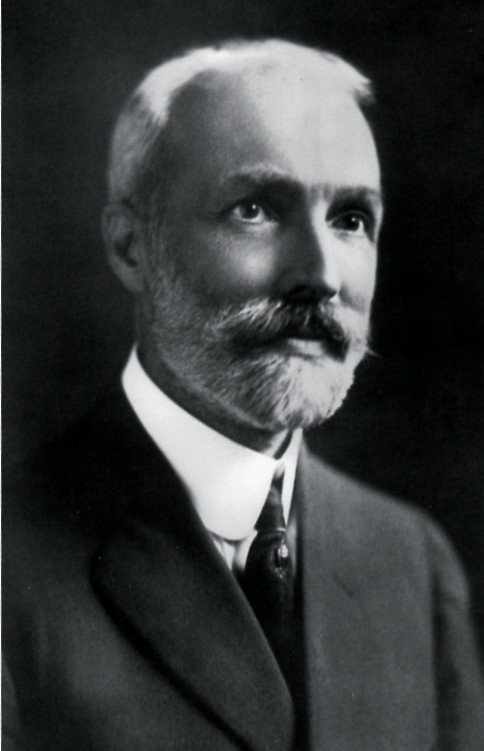
George Dayton

The Westminster Presbyterian Church in downtown Minneapolis was burned down during the Panic of 1893. The church was looking for revenue because insurance would not cover the cost of a new building. Its congregation appealed to George Dayton, an active parishioner, to purchase the empty corner lot adjacent to the original church so it could be rebuilt. He eventually constructed a six-story building on the newly purchased property. Looking for tenants, Dayton convinced the Reuben Simon Goodfellow Company to move its nearby Goodfellows department store into the newly erected building in 1902. However, its owner retired altogether and sold his interest in the store to Dayton. The store was renamed the Dayton Dry Goods Company in 1903, and its name was shortened to the Dayton Company in 1910. Having maintained connections as a banker yet lacking previous retail experience, Dayton operated the company as a family enterprise over which he held tight control and enforced strict Presbyterian guidelines. Consequently, the store forbade the selling of alcohol, refused to advertise in newspapers that sponsored liquor ads, and would not allow any business activity on Sundays. In 1918, Dayton, who donated most of his money to charity, founded the Dayton Foundation with $1 million.

By the 1920s, the Dayton Company was a multimillion-dollar business that filled the entire six-story building. Dayton began transferring parts of the business to his son Nelson after his other son, David, died at age 43 in 1923. The company made its first expansion with the acquisition of the Minneapolis-based jeweler J.B. Hudson & Son right before the Wall Street Crash of 1929. Its jewelry store operated at a net loss during the Great Depression, but its department store weathered the economic crisis. Dayton died in 1938 and was succeeded as president of the $14 million business by his son Nelson, who maintained his father's strict Presbyterian guidelines and conservative management style. Throughout World War II, Nelson Dayton's managers focused on keeping the store stocked, which led to an increase in revenue. When the War Production Board initiated its scrap metal drives, Dayton donated the department store's electric sign to the local scrap metal heap. In 1944, the company offered its workers retirement benefits, becoming one of the first stores in the United States to do so, and began offering a comprehensive health insurance policy in 1950. In 1946, the business started contributing 5% of its taxable income to the Dayton Foundation.

Following Nelson Dayton's death in 1950, his son Donald took over as president. He ran the company alongside four of his cousins instead of under a single person and replaced the Presbyterian guidelines with a more secular approach. The company began selling alcohol, operating on Sundays, and favoring a more radical, aggressive, innovative, costly, and expansive management style. The company acquired the Portland, Oregon–based Lipman's department store in the 1950s and operated it as a separate division. In 1956, the Dayton Company opened Southdale Center, a two-level shopping center in the Minneapolis suburb of Edina. Because there were only 113 good outdoor shopping days a year in Minneapolis, the architect built the mall under a cover, making it the world's first fully enclosed shopping mall. The Dayton Company became a retail chain with the opening of its second department store in Southdale.

== 1962–1975: Founding of Target ==
While working for the Dayton company, John F. Geisse developed the concept of upscale discount retailing. On May 1, 1962, the Dayton Company, using Geisse's concepts, opened its first Target discount store, located at 1515 West County Road B in Roseville, a suburb of Saint Paul, Minnesota, located on the site of an uncompleted Jubilee City department store. The name "Target" originated from Dayton's publicity director, Stewart K. Widdess, and was intended to prevent consumers from associating the new discount store chain with the department store. Douglas Dayton served as the first president of Target. The new subsidiary ended its first year with four units, all in Minnesota. Target Stores lost money in its initial years but reported its first gain in 1965, with sales reaching $39 million, allowing a fifth store to open in the Minneapolis suburb of Bloomington. By 1964, Dayton's was the country's second-largest privately owned department store chain.

In 1966, Bruce Dayton launched the B. Dalton Bookseller specialty chain as a Dayton Company subsidiary. Target Stores expanded outside of Minnesota by opening two stores in Denver, and sales exceeded $60 million. The first of these two stores was built in 1966 in Glendale, Colorado, part of the Denver Metropolitan area. The store was upgraded to a SuperTarget in 2003 and is still open. The next year, the Dayton holdings were reorganized as Dayton Corporation, and it went public with its first offering of common stock. It opened two more Target stores in Minnesota, resulting in nine units. It acquired the San Francisco–based jeweler Shreve & Co., which it merged with previously acquired J.B. Hudson & Son to form Dayton Jewelers.

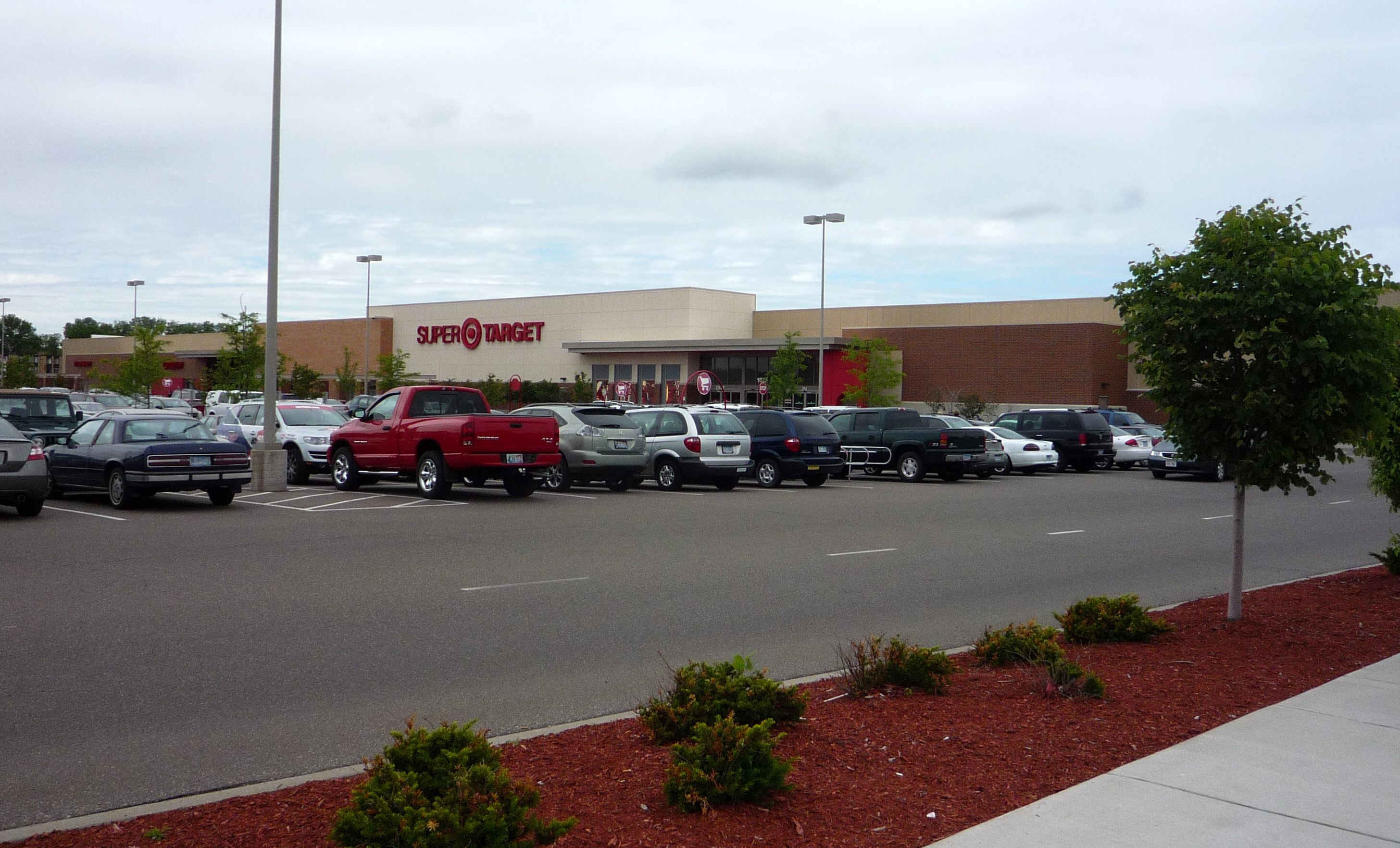
This SuperTarget in Roseville, Minnesota (Store #2101), sits on the site of the first Target store (Store #1), which opened in 1962 and was torn down and replaced by this much larger store in 2005.

In 1968, Target updated its bullseye logo, opting for a more modern look, and expanded into St. Louis, Missouri, with two new stores. Target's president, Douglas J. Dayton, returned to the parent Dayton Corporation and was succeeded by William A. Hodder. Senior vice-president and founder John Geisse left the company. Geisse was later hired by St. Louis–based May Department Stores, where he founded the Venture Stores chain. Target Stores ended the year with eleven units and $130 million in sales. It acquired the Los Angeles–based Pickwick Book Shops and merged it into B. Dalton Bookseller.

In 1969, the company acquired the Boston-based Lechmere electronics and appliances chain, which operated in New England, as well as the Philadelphia-based jewelry chain J.E. Caldwell. It expanded Target Stores into Texas and Oklahoma with six new units and built its first distribution center in Fridley, Minnesota. The Dayton Company merged with the Detroit-based J.L. Hudson Company that year to become the Dayton-Hudson Corporation, the 14th largest retailer in the United States, consisting of Target and five major department store chains: Dayton's; Diamond's of Phoenix, Arizona; Hudson's; John A. Brown of Oklahoma City, Oklahoma; and Lipman's. The company offered Dayton-Hudson stock on the New York Stock Exchange. The Dayton Foundation changed its name to the Dayton Hudson Foundation, and Dayton-Hudson continued its practice of donating 5% of its taxable income to the foundation.

In 1970, Target Stores added seven new units, including two units in Wisconsin, and the twenty-four-unit chain reached $200 million in sales. Dayton-Hudson said at the time that they could forecast their discount-store operations overshadowing their department store revenue in the near future. Dayton-Hudson acquired the Team Electronics specialty chain, which was headed by Stephen L. Pistner. It subsequently acquired the Chicago-based jeweler C.D. Peacock, Inc., and the San Diego–based jeweler J. Jessop and Sons. Also in 1970, Dayton-Hudson purchased Ronzone's in Las Vegas, Nevada, converting it into a Diamond's store. In January 1970, Dayton-Hudson announced they would be one of the tenants of the IDS Center, the first modern-era skyscraper built in Minneapolis, Minnesota. The location would serve as their headquarters until 2000. In 1971, Dayton-Hudson acquired sixteen stores from the Arlan's department store chain in Colorado, Iowa, and Oklahoma. Two of those units reopened as Target stores that year. Also that year, Dayton-Hudson's sales across all its chains surpassed $1 billion. In 1972, the other fourteen units from Arlan's acquisition were reopened as Target stores, bringing the total number of units to forty-six. As a result of its rapid expansion and the top executives' lack of experience in discount retailing, the chain reported its first decrease in profits since its initial years, and Dayton-Hudson considered selling off the Target Stores subsidiary. The chain's loss in operational revenue was due to overstocking and carrying goods over multiple years, regardless of inventory and storage costs. Dayton-Hudson acquired two Twin Cities mail-order firms, Sibley and Consolidated Merchandising, that same year. In 1973, Stephen Pistner, who had already revived Team Electronics and would later work for Montgomery Ward and Ames, was named chief executive officer of Target Stores, and Kenneth A. Macke was named Target Stores' senior vice-president. The new management marked down merchandise to clear out its overstock and allowed only one new unit to open that year.

== 1975–1981: Early prosperity ==
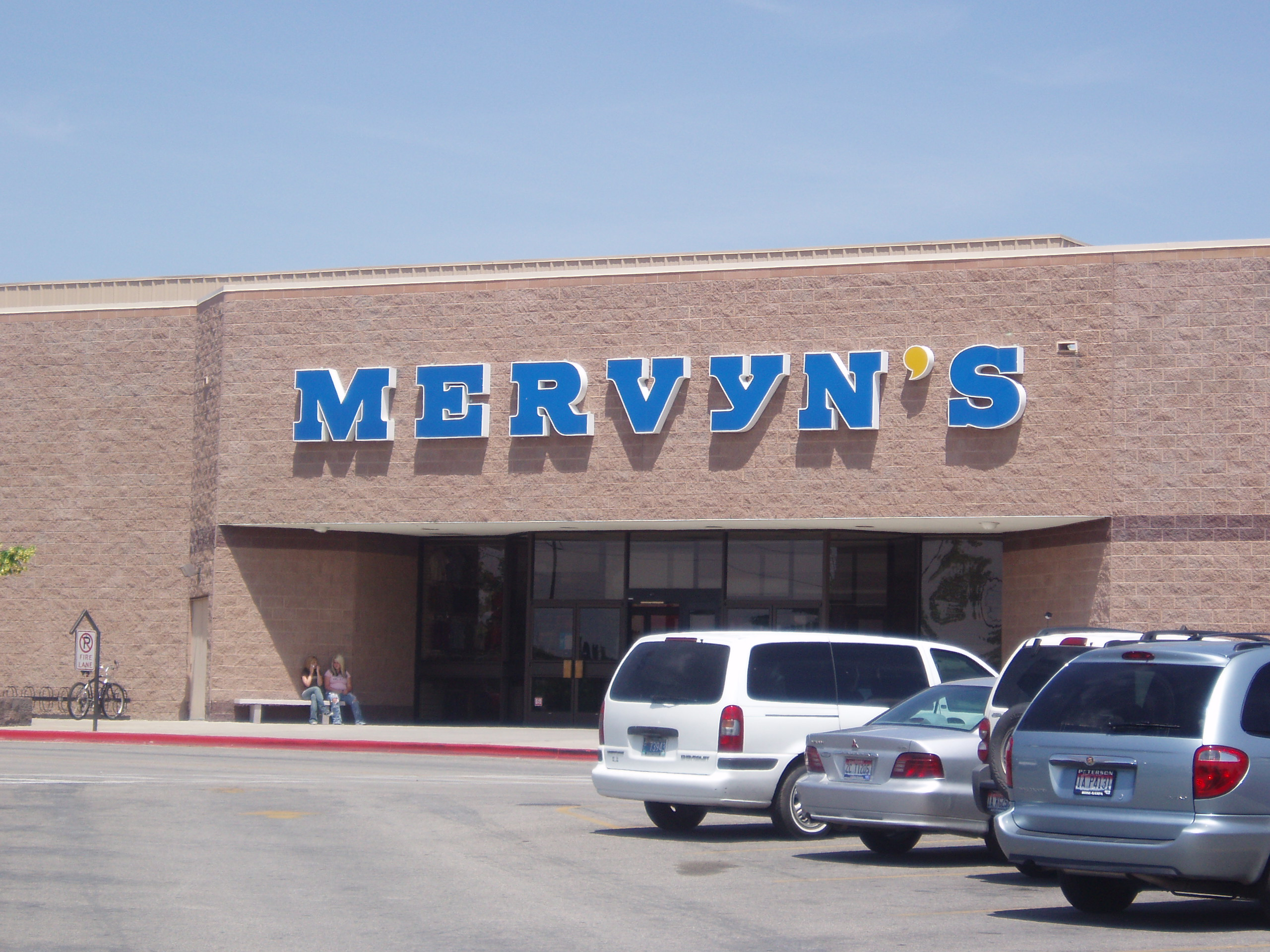
Target owned Mervyn's from 1978 to 2004. Pictured here is the location at Boise Towne Square in Boise, Idaho (store #220).

In 1975, Target opened two stores, reaching 49 units in nine states and $511 million (~$2.37 billion in 2025) in sales. That year, the Target discount chain became Dayton-Hudson's top revenue producer. In 1976, Dayton-Hudson was the eighth largest retailer in the U.S., and Target opened four new units and reached $600 million (~$2.64 billion in 2025) in sales. Macke was promoted to president and chief executive officer of Target Stores. Inspired by the Dayton Hudson Foundation, the Minneapolis Chamber of Commerce started the 5% Club (now known as the Minnesota Keystone Program), which honored companies that donated 5% of their taxable incomes to charities. In 1977, Target Stores opened seven new units and Stephen Pistner became president of Dayton-Hudson, with Macke succeeding him as chairman and chief executive officer of Target Stores. The senior vice president of Dayton-Hudson, Bruce G. Allbright, moved to Target Stores and succeeded Kenneth Macke as president. In 1978, the company acquired Mervyn's and became the 7th largest general merchandise retailer in the United States. Target Stores opened eight new stores that year, including its first shopping mall anchor store in Grand Forks, North Dakota. In 1979, it opened 13 new units to a total of 80 Target stores in eleven states. Dayton-Hudson reached $3 billion in sales, with $1.12 billion coming from the Target store chain alone.

Dayton-Hudson sold its nine owned shopping centers in 1978 to Equitable Life Assurance Company, including the 5 owned in Michigan, and the 4 "Dales" shopping centers they developed and owned in Minnesota. In 1980, Dayton-Hudson sold its Lipman's department store chain of six units to Marshall Field's, which rebranded the stores as Frederick & Nelson. That year, Target Stores opened seventeen new units, including expansions into Tennessee and Kansas. It acquired the Ayr-Way discount retail chain of 40 stores and one distribution center from Indianapolis-based L.S. Ayres & Company. In 1981, Dayton-Hudson sold its interest in four regional shopping centers to Equitable Life Assurance Company. Also in 1981, it reopened the stores acquired in the Ayr-Way acquisition as Target stores. Stephen Pistner left the parent company to join Montgomery Ward, and Kenneth Macke succeeded him as president of Dayton-Hudson. Floyd Hall succeeded Kenneth Macke as chairman and chief executive officer of Target Stores. Bruce Allbright left the company to work for Woolworth, where he was named chairman and chief executive officer of Woolco. Bob Ulrich became president and chief executive officer of Diamond's Department Stores. In addition to the Ayr-Way acquisition, Target Stores expanded by opening fourteen new units and a third distribution center in Little Rock, Arkansas, to a total of 151 units and $2.05 billion in sales.

== 1982–1999: Nationwide expansion ==
Since the launch of Target Stores, the company has focused its expansion in the central United States. In 1982, it expanded into the West Coast market by acquiring 33 FedMart stores in Arizona, California, and Texas and opening a fourth distribution center in Los Angeles. Bruce Allbright returned to Target Stores as its vice chairman and chief administrative officer, and the chain expanded to 167 units and $2.41 billion in sales. It sold the Dayton-Hudson Jewelers subsidiary to Henry Birks & Sons of Montreal. In 1983, Kenneth Dayton, the last Dayton family member to work for Dayton-Hudson retired. Also in 1983, the 33 units acquired from FedMart were reopened as Target stores. It founded the Plums off-price apparel specialty store chain with four units in the Los Angeles area, with an intended audience of middle-to-upper income women. In 1984, it sold its Plums chain to Ross Stores after only 11 months of operation, and it sold its Diamond's and John A. Brown department store chains to Dillard's. Meanwhile, Target Stores added nine new units to a total of 215 stores and $3.55 billion in sales. Floyd Hall left the company and Bruce Allbright succeeded him as chairman and chief executive officer of Target Stores. In May 1984, Bob Ulrich became president of the Dayton-Hudson Department Store Division, and in December 1984 became president of Target Stores. In 1986, the company acquired fifty Gemco stores from Lucky Stores in California and Arizona, which made Target Stores the dominant retailer in Southern California, as the chain grew to a total of 246 units. It opened a fifth distribution center in Pueblo, Colorado. Dayton-Hudson sold the B. Dalton Bookseller chain of several hundred units to Barnes & Noble. At this time, Dayton-Hudson Corporation also started a housewares chain called R. G. Branden's, but this operation was unsuccessful.

In 1987, the acquired Gemco units reopened as Target units, and Target Stores expanded into Michigan and Nevada, including six new units in Detroit, Michigan, to compete directly against Detroit-based Kmart, leading to a total of 317 units in 24 states and $5.3 billion (~$12.9 billion in 2025) in sales. Bruce Allbright became president of Dayton-Hudson, and Bob Ulrich succeeded him as chairman and chief executive officer of Target Stores. The Dart Group attempted a takeover bid by aggressively buying its stock. Kenneth Macke proposed six amendments to Minnesota's 1983 anti-takeover law, and his proposed amendments were passed that summer by the state's legislature. This prevented the Dart Group from being able to call for a shareholders' meeting for the purpose of electing a board that would favor Dart if their bid were to turn hostile. Dart originally offered $65 a share, and then raised its offer to $68. The stock market crash of October 1987 ended Dart's attempt to take over the company, when Dayton-Hudson stock fell to $28.75 a share the day the market crashed. Dart's move is estimated to have resulted in an after-tax loss of about $70 million. In 1988, Target Stores expanded into the Northwestern United States by opening eight units in Washington and three in Oregon, to a total of 341 units in 27 states. It opened a distribution center in Sacramento, California, and replaced the existing distribution center in Indianapolis, Indiana, from the Ayr-Way acquisition with a new one. In 1989, it expanded by 60 units, especially in the Southeastern United States where it entered Florida, Georgia, North Carolina, and South Carolina, to a total of 399 units in 30 states with $7.51 billion (~$16.9 billion in 2025) in sales. This included an acquisition of 31 more stores from Federated Department Stores' Gold Circle and Richway chains in Florida, Georgia, and North Carolina, which were later reopened as Target stores. It sold its Lechmere chain that year to a group of investors including Berkshire Partners, a leveraged buy-out firm based in Boston, Massachusetts, eight Lechmere executives, and two local shopping mall executives.

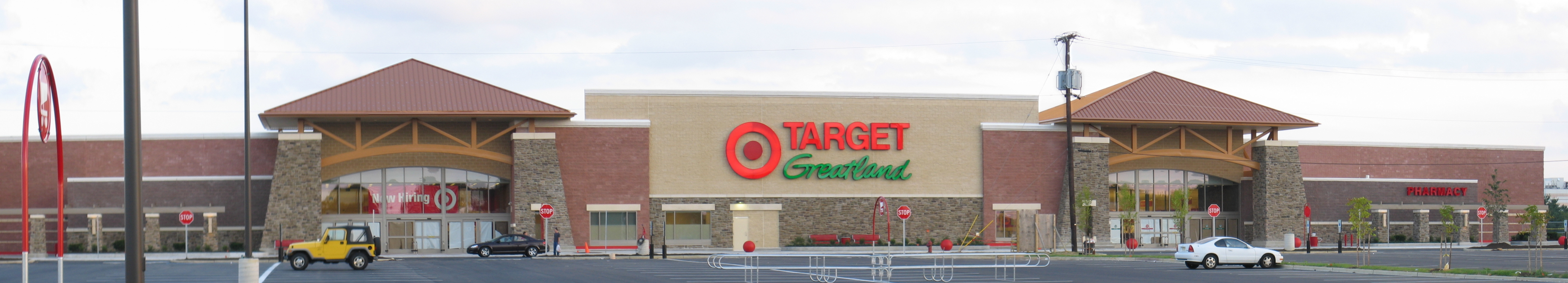
Target Greatland store in Mount Laurel, New Jersey prior to opening in 2004 (Store #1917). This has since converted into a regular Target with "PFresh".

In 1990, it acquired Marshall Field's from Batus Inc., and Target Stores opened its first Target Greatland general merchandise superstore in Apple Valley, Minnesota. By 1991, Target Stores had opened 43 Target Greatland units, and sales reached $9.01 billion (~$19 billion in 2025). In 1992, it created a short-lived chain of apparel specialty stores called Everyday Hero with two stores in Minneapolis. They attempted to compete against other apparel specialty stores such as Gap by offering private label apparel such as its Merona brand. In 1993, it created a chain of closeout stores called Smarts for liquidating clearance merchandise, such as private label apparel, that did not appeal to typical closeout chains that were only interested in national brands. It operated four Smarts units out of former Target stores in Rancho Cucamonga, California, Des Moines, Iowa, El Paso, Texas, and Indianapolis, Indiana, that each closed out merchandise in nearby distribution centers. In 1994, Kenneth Macke left the company, and Bob Ulrich succeeded him as the new chairman and CEO of Dayton-Hudson. In 1995, Target Stores opened its first SuperTarget hypermarket in Omaha, Nebraska. It closed the four Smarts units after only two years of operation. Its store count increased to 670 with $15.7 billion in sales. It launched the Target Guest Card, the discount retail industry's first store credit card.

In 1996, J.C. Penney Company, Inc., the fifth-largest retailer in the United States, offered to buy out Dayton-Hudson, the fourth largest retailer, for $6.82 billion. The offer, which most analysts considered as insufficiently valuing the company, was rebuffed by Dayton-Hudson, saying it preferred to remain independent. Target Stores increased its store count to 736 units in 38 states with $17.8 billion in sales, and remained the company's main area of growth while the other two department store subsidiaries underperformed. The middle scale Mervyn's department store chain consisted of 300 units in 16 states, while the upscale Department Stores Division operated 26 Marshall Field's, 22 Hudson's, and 19 Dayton's stores. In 1997, both of the Everyday Hero stores were closed. Target's store count rose to 796 units, and sales rose to $20.2 billion. In an effort to turn the department store chains around, Mervyn's closed 35 units, including all of its stores in Florida and Georgia. Marshall Field's sold all of its stores in Texas and closed its store in Milwaukee.

In 1998, Dayton-Hudson acquired Greenspring Company's multi-catalog direct marketing unit, Rivertown Trading Company, from Minnesota Communications Group, and it acquired the Associated Merchandising Corporation, an apparel supplier. Target Stores grew to 851 units and $23.0 billion in sales. The Target Guest Card program had registered nine million accounts.

In 1999, Dayton-Hudson acquired Fedco and its ten stores in a move to expand its SuperTarget operation into Southern California. It reopened six of these stores under the Target brand and sold the other four locations to Wal-Mart, Home Depot, and the Ontario Police Department, and its store count rose to 912 units in 44 states with sales reaching $26.0 billion. Revenue for Dayton-Hudson increased to $33.7 billion, and net income reached $1.14 billion, passing $1 billion for the first time and nearly tripling the 1996 profits of $463 million. This increase in profit was due mainly to the Target chain, which Ulrich had focused on making feature high-quality products for low prices. On September 7, 1999, the company relaunched its Target.com website as an e-commerce site as part of its discount retail division. The site initially offered merchandise that differentiated its stores from its competitors, such as its Michael Graves brand.

== 2000–2011: Target Corporation ==
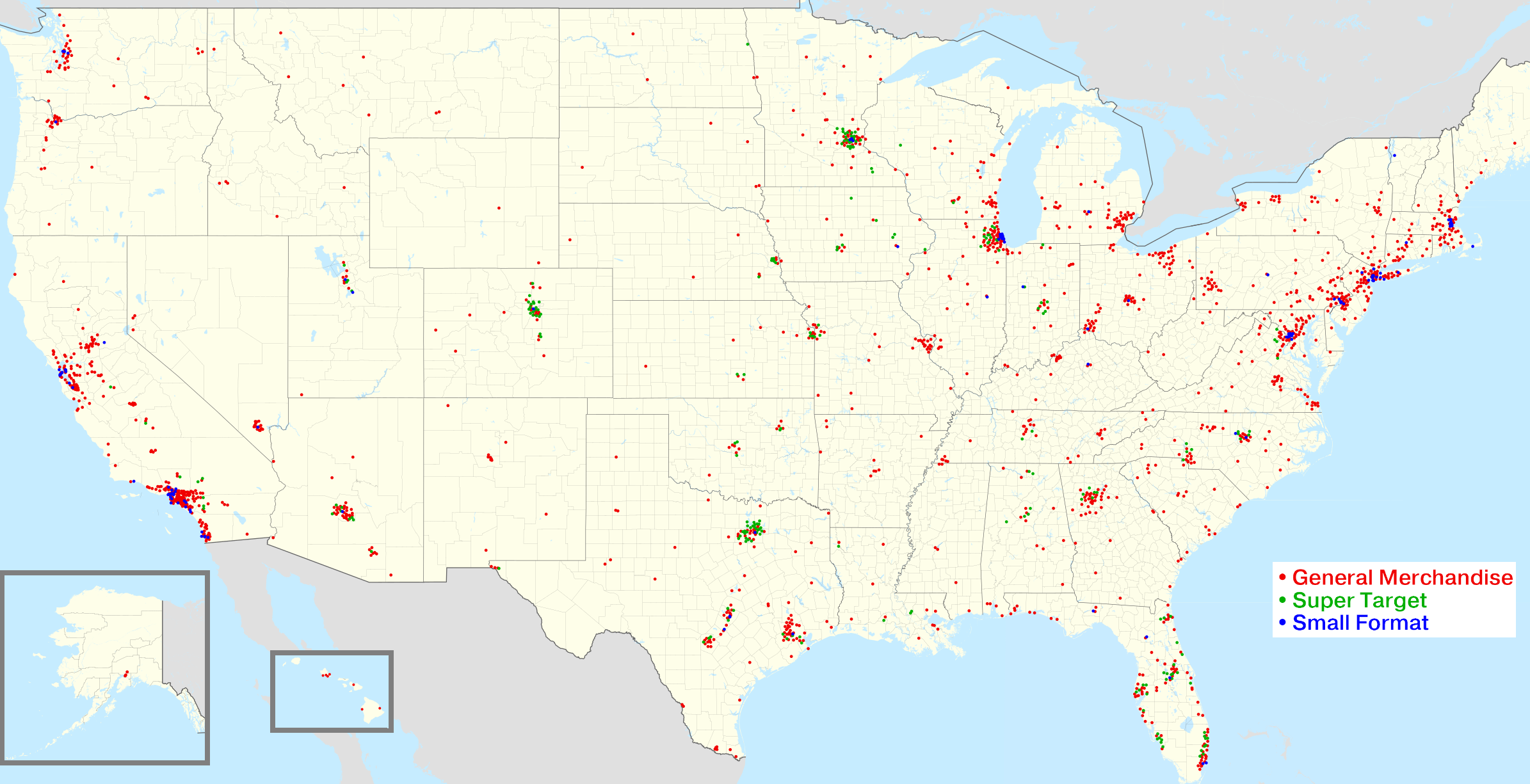
Target stores in United States, as of December 2020

In January 2000, Dayton-Hudson Corporation changed its name to Target Corporation and its ticker symbol to TGT; by then, between 75 percent and 80 percent of the corporation's total sales and earnings came from Target Stores, while the other four chains—Dayton's, Hudson's, Marshall Field's, and Mervyn's—were used to fuel the growth of the discount chain, which expanded to 977 stores in 46 states and sales reached $29.7 billion (~$52.7 billion in 2025) by the end of the year. It separated its e-commerce operations from its retailing division, and combined it with its Rivertown Trading unit into a stand-alone subsidiary called target.direct. It started offering the Target Visa, as consumer trends were moving more towards third-party Visa and MasterCards and away from private-label cards such as the Target Guest Card.

In 2001, it launched its online gift registry, and in preparation for this, it wanted to operate its upscale Department Stores Division, consisting of 19 Dayton's, 21 Hudson's, and 24 Marshall Field's stores, under a unified department store name. It announced in January that it was renaming its Dayton's and Hudson's stores to Marshall Field's. The name was chosen for multiple reasons: out of the three, Marshall Field's was the most recognizable name in the Department Stores Division, its base in Chicago was bigger than Dayton's base in Minneapolis and Hudson's base in Detroit, Chicago was a major travel hub, and it was the largest chain of the three. Target Stores expanded into Maine, reaching 1,053 units in 47 states and $33.0 billion in sales. Around the same time, the chain made a successful expansion into the Pittsburgh market, where Target capitalized on the collapse of Ames Department Stores that coincidentally happened at the same time as Target's expansion into the area.

In 2002, it expanded to 1,147 units, which included stores in San Leandro, Fremont, and Hayward, California, and sales reached $37.4 billion (~$63.9 billion in 2025). Most of those locations replaced former Montgomery Ward locations, which closed in 2001. In 2003, Target reached 1,225 units and $42.0 billion in sales. Despite the growth of the discount retailer, neither Marshall Field's nor Mervyn's were adding to its store count, and their earnings were consistently declining. Marshall Field's sold two of its stores in Columbus, Ohio, in 2003. On June 9, 2004, Target Corporation announced its sale of the Marshall Field's chain to St. Louis–based May Department Stores, which would become effective July 31, 2004. As well, on July 21, 2004, Target Corporation announced the $1.65 billion sale of Mervyn's to an investment consortium including Sun Capital Partners, Cerberus Capital Management, and Lubert-Adler/Klaff and Partners, L.P., which was finalized September 2. Target Stores expanded to 1,308 units and reached US$46.8 billion in sales. In 2005, Target began operation of an overseas technology office in Bangalore, India. It reached 1,397 units and $52.6 billion in sales. In February 2005, Target Corporation took a $65 million charge to change the way it accounted for leases, which would reconcile the way Target depreciated its buildings and calculated rent expense. The adjustment included $10 million for 2004 and $55 million for prior years.

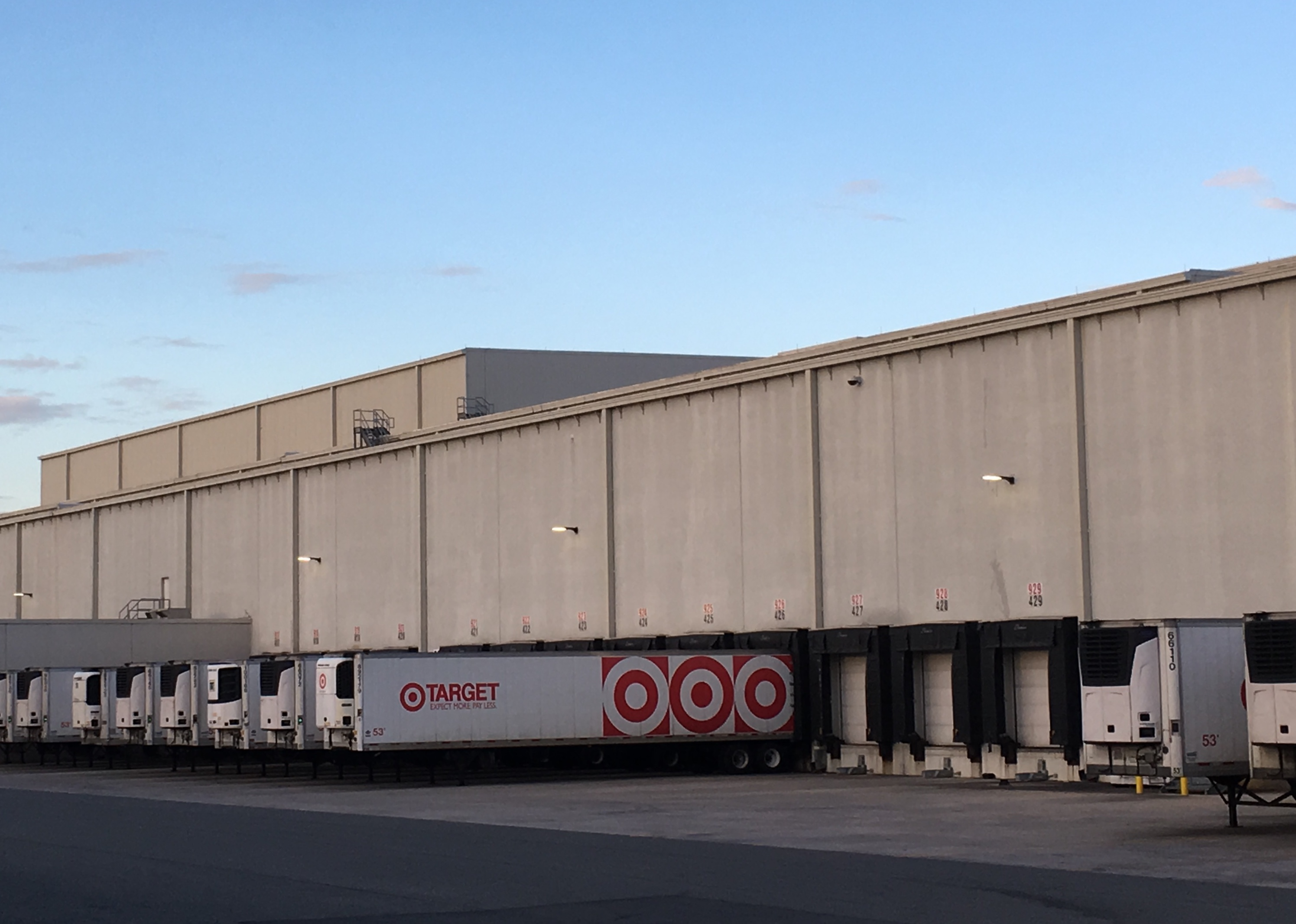
Target food distribution center (T-3892) in Lake City, Florida

In 2006, Target completed construction of the Robert J. Ulrich Center in Embassy Golf Links in Bangalore, and Target planned to continue its expansion into India with the construction of additional office space at the Mysore Corporate Campus and successfully opened a branch at Mysore. It expanded to 1,488 units, and sales reached $59.4 billion. On January 9, 2008, Bob Ulrich announced his plans to retire as CEO, and named Gregg Steinhafel as his successor. Ulrich's retirement was due to Target Corporation policy requiring its high-ranking officers to retire at the age of 65. While his retirement as CEO was effective May 1, he remained the chairman of the board until the end of the 2008 fiscal year. On March 4, 2009, Target expanded outside of the continental United States for the first time. Two stores were opened simultaneously on the island of Oahu in Hawaii, along with two stores in Alaska, in Anchorage. Despite the economic downturn, media reports indicated sizable crowds and brisk sales. The opening of the Hawaii stores left Vermont as the only state in which Target did not operate. In June 2010, Target announced its goal to give $1 billion to education causes and charities by 2015. Target School Library Makeovers is a featured program in this initiative. In August 2010, after a "lengthy wind-down", Target began a nationwide closing of its remaining 262 garden centers, reportedly due to "stronger competition from home-improvement stores, Walmart and independent garden centers". In September 2010, numerous Target locations began adding a fresh produce department to their stores.

In 2007, Target built its first food distribution center in Lake City, Florida, which opened in 2008.

== 2011–2015: Initiatives, Canada and data breach ==
On January 22, 2014, Target "informed workers that it is terminating 475 positions at its offices globally". On March 5, 2014, Target Corp.'s chief information officer Beth Jacob resigned, having been in the role since 2008; this is thought to be due to the company's overhaul of its information security systems.

On June 15, 2015, CVS Health announced its agreement to acquire Target's pharmacy and retail clinic businesses. The deal expanded CVS to new markets in Seattle, Denver, Portland and Salt Lake City. The acquisition includes more than 1,660 pharmacies in 47 states. CVS will operate them through a store-within-a-store format. Target's nearly 80 clinic locations will be rebranded as MinuteClinic, and CVS plans to open up to 20 new clinics in their stores within three years.

In July 2015, the company opened Target Open House, a retail space in San Francisco that shows connected home products which can purchased at select Target stores. The space, located in the Metreon Shopping Center, adopts the same layout as a house so it can show real world use cases for the showcased products. In addition, the space hosts interviews with company founders which have their products on display at the store.

=== Target Canada ===
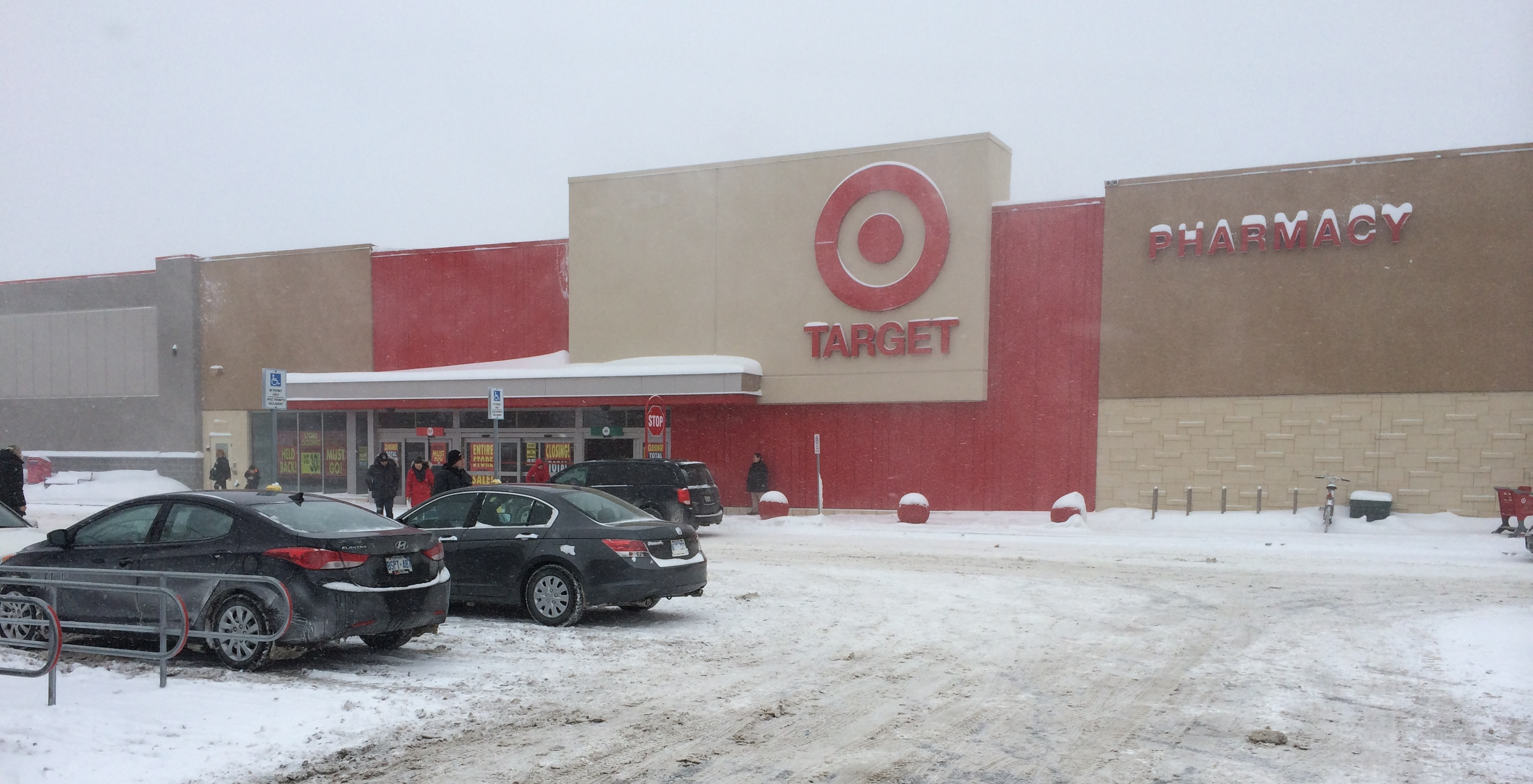
Target store during liquidation in Nepean, Ottawa, Ontario, Canada (store #3628), a former Zellers, now a FreshCo

On January 13, 2011, Target announced its expansion into Canada, when it purchased the leaseholds for up to 220 stores of the Canadian sale chain Zellers, owned by the Hudson's Bay Company. The deal was announced to have been made for 1.8 billion dollars. The company stated that they aimed to provide Canadians with a "true Target-brand experience", hinting that its product selection in Canada would vary little from that found in its United States stores.

Target opened its first Canadian stores in March 2013, and at its peak, Target Canada had 133 stores. However, the expansion into Canada was beset with problems, including supply chain issues that resulted in stores with aisles of empty shelves and higher-than-expected retail prices. Target Canada racked up losses of $2.1 billion in its short life, and the store's botched expansion was characterized by the Canadian and US media as a "spectacular failure", "an unmitigated disaster", and "a gold standard case study in what retailers should not do when they enter a new market".

On January 15, 2015, Target announced that all 133 of its Canadian outlets would be closed and liquidated by the end of 2015. The last Target Canada stores closed on April 12, 2015, far ahead of the initial schedule.

=== 2013 security breach ===
On December 18, 2013, security expert Brian Krebs broke news that Target was investigating a major data breach "potentially involving millions of customer credit and debit card records". On December 19, Target confirmed the incident via a press release, revealing that the hack took place between November 27 and December 15, 2013. Target warned that up to 40 million consumer credit and debit cards may have been compromised. Hackers gained access to customer names, card numbers, expiration dates, and CVV security codes of the cards issued by financial institutions. On December 27, Target disclosed that debit card PIN data had also been stolen, albeit in encrypted form, reversing an earlier stance that PIN data was not part of the breach. Target noted that the accessed PIN numbers were encrypted using Triple DES and has stated the PINs remain "safe and secure" due to the encryption. On January 10, 2014, Target disclosed that the names, mailing addresses, phone numbers or email addresses of up to 70 million additional people had also been stolen, bringing the possible number of customers affected up to 110 million.

According to Bloomberg Businessweek, Target's computer security team was notified of the breach via the FireEye security service they employed, had ample time to disrupt the theft of credit cards and other customer data, but did not act to prevent theft from being carried out.

Target encouraged customers who shopped at its US stores (online orders were not affected) during the specified timeframe to closely monitor their credit and debit cards for irregular activity. The retailer confirmed that it is working with law enforcement, including the United States Secret Service, "to bring those responsible to justice". The data breach has been called the second-largest retail cyber attack in history, and has been compared to the 2009 non-retail Heartland Payment Systems compromise, which affected 130 million credit cards, and to the 2007 retail TJX Companies compromise, which affected 90 million people. As an apology to the public, all Target stores in the United States gave retail shoppers a 10% storewide discount for the weekend of December 21–22, 2013. Target has offered free credit monitoring via Experian to affected customers. Target reported total transactions for the same time last year were down 3-4%, as of December 23, 2013.

According to Time magazine, a 17-year-old Russian teen was suspected to be the author of the Point of Sale (POS) malware program, "BlackPOS", which was used by others to attack unpatched Windows computers used at Target. The teen denied the allegation. Later, a 23-year-old Russian, Rinat Shabayev, claimed to be the malware author.

On January 29, 2014, a Target spokeswoman said that the individual(s) who hacked its customers' data had stolen credentials from a store vendor, but did not elaborate on which vendor or which credentials were taken.

As the fallout of the data breach continued, on March 6, 2014, Target announced the resignation of its chief information officer and an overhaul of its information security practices. In a further step to restore faith in customers, the company advised that it will look externally for appointments to both the CIO role and a new chief compliance officer role.

On May 5, 2014, Target announced the resignation of its chief executive officer, Gregg Steinhafel. Analysts speculated that the data breach, as well as the financial losses caused by over-aggressive Canadian expansion, contributed to his departure.

In 2015, U.S. District Judge Paul Magnuson in Minnesota endorsed a $10 million settlement of a consumer class-action lawsuit over the breach. He said he would grant the settlement preliminary approval.

In May 2017, Target reached an $18.5 million settlement with 47 states and the District of Columbia, ending a multistate investigation into the breach.

== 2016–2020: Later years ==
On October 2, 2017, Target announced a new online order service, Drive Up, that allows guests to order merchandise online for pickup outside the store. Guests hit the 'I'm on My Way' button en route to their store. They pull into designated parking spots out front, and soon a Target team member comes out to greet them with their order.

On October 19, 2017, Target announced that they would be opening a small-format store and their first store in Vermont in the University Mall in South Burlington in October 2018. The store replaced the former Bon-Ton (originally Almy's and later Steinbach), which closed in January 2018.

In December 2017, Target announced the corporation's intention to purchase Shipt, an internet-based grocery delivery service, for a reported $550 million (~$709 million in 2025). The acquisition is intended to help same-day delivery and to better compete with Amazon. Target announced in February 2018 that it would shift its sales model for compact discs, DVDs, and Blu-ray Discs to provide them solely on a contingency basis, citing reduced physical media sales in favor of digital downloads and streaming.

In May 2018, according to YouGov ratings, Target was determined to be the most popular department store in America. Target was rated 69% positive opinions by America, and 99% of people have heard of it. Women had a 74% positive opinion towards Target, and men had 65%.

On a Saturday, June 15, 2019, at many Target stores in the U.S., shoppers experienced a systems outage that shut down the card readers at check-out registers for close to two hours causing backed up lines. The following day, there were additional spot outages that the company says were unrelated to Saturday's problems. On social media, the outage was dubbed "The Great Target Outage of '19". Another—although much shorter—checkout register crash happened in 2013, on the same date as the Saturday crash.

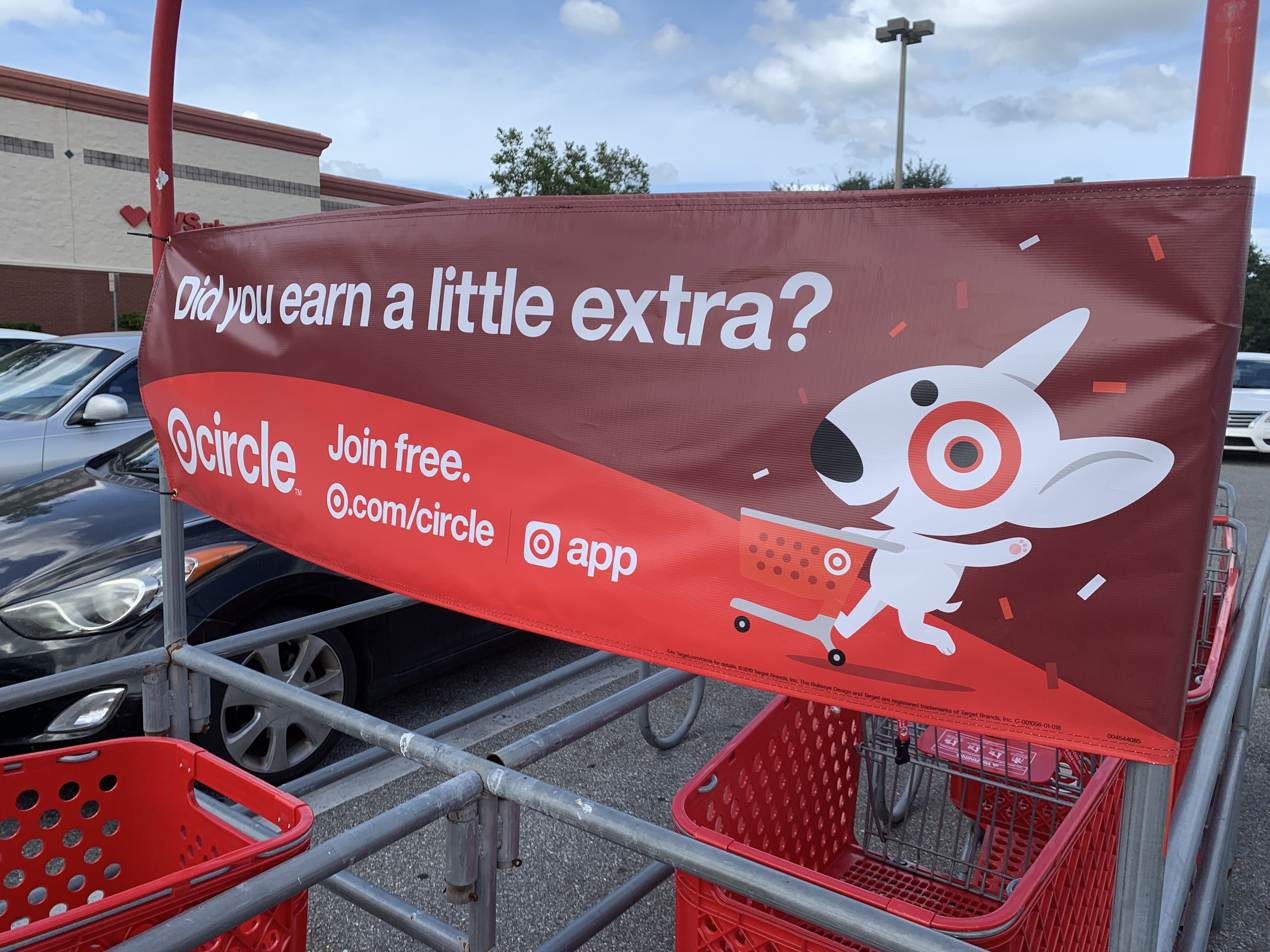
Target Circle cart corral banner at the Spring Hill Target store (T0919) in Spring Hill, Florida, in October 2019

In September 2019, Target announced its new rewards program, Target Circle, which would be coming to all Target stores on October 6, 2019. In conjunction, the name of the store's credit and debit card was announced to be changed from "Target REDcard" to "Target RedCard". At its debut, Target Circle allows shoppers to earn 1% back in rewards to use on a future purchase, except when a Target RedCard is used. Target RedCard holders continue to save an instant 5% on their total but now earn votes from a purchase with Target Circle to use on deciding where Target gives its 5% back in the community. The Target Circle rewards program does not use a physical card, but can be used by presenting the Target Wallet in the Target App or entering a mobile phone number at checkout.

On August 25, 2019, Target and the Walt Disney Company announced a partnership to have a Disney Store in several Target locations. The Disney Store at Target locations have a "shop-in-shop" layout with an average square feet of 750. Tru Kids and Target also announced a partnership on October 8, 2019, to relaunch the website of Toys "R" Us Toysrus.com. When a customer goes to Toysrus.com to purchase a product, it is redirected to Target.com to complete the order. The website allows Toys "R" Us to have an online presence after bankruptcy and, at the same time, boosts Target's toy sales.

== Since 2020 ==
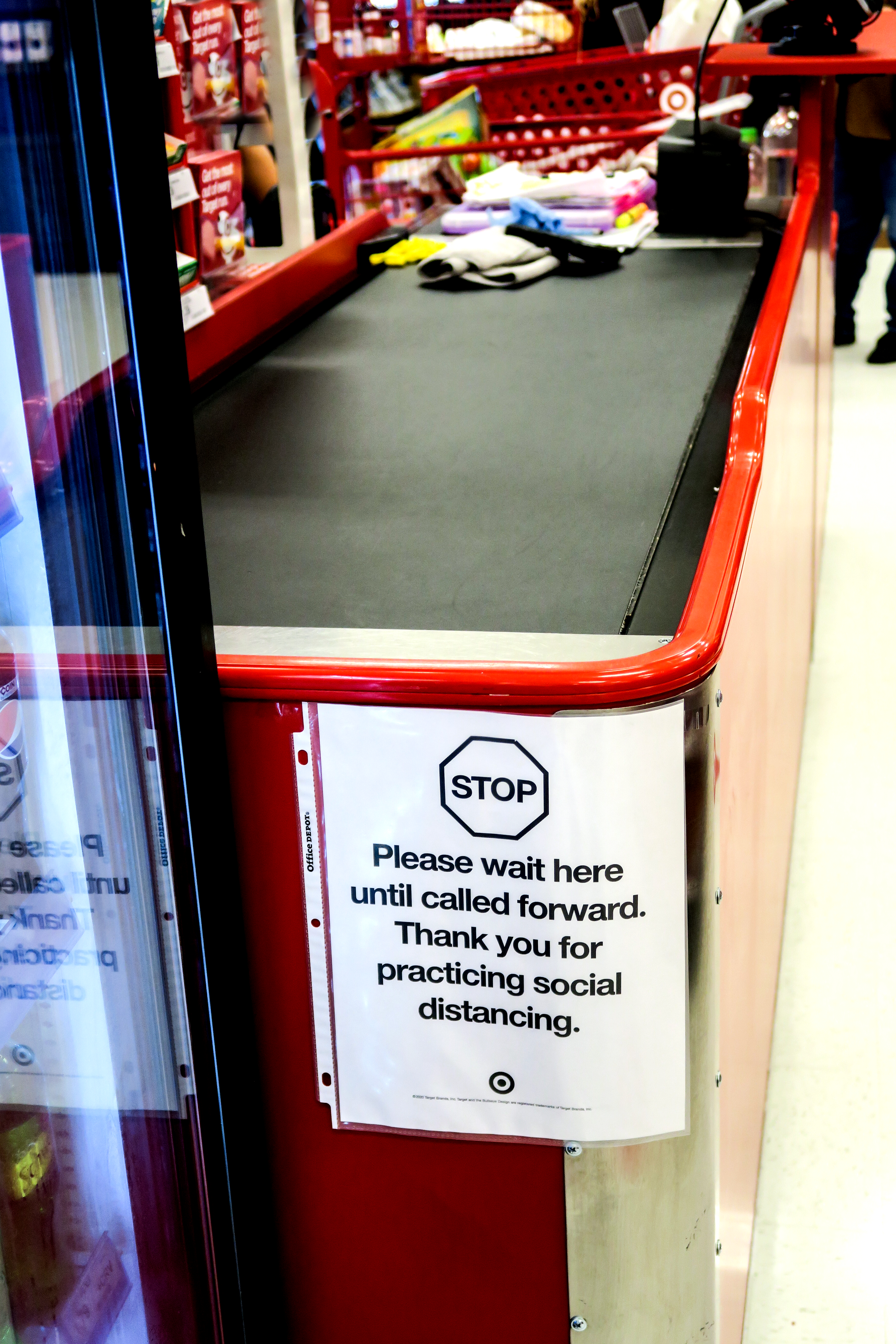
A Southern California Target store urges shoppers to keep their distance due to the coronavirus outbreak.

On March 13, 2020, Brian Cornell (CEO) took part in then-President Trump's address on the COVID-19 pandemic. Target, along with competitors Walmart, CVS Pharmacy, and Walgreens, would take part in using their stores for testing of COVID-19. On July 16, 2020, Target joined other major retailers in requiring all customers to wear masks in its U.S. stores. The latest quarter saw a doubling of digitally comparable sales, which included an online order and mobile. This model led Target to become a market leader this year, in addition to sales of products that were popularly purchased at the time, such as home furnishing, food, and a lot of toilet paper.

Also, Target expanded its roster of exclusively owned brands by adding Mondo Llama, Favorite Day, and Kindfull. Target launched Ulta Beauty at Target and deepened its partnerships with Disney, Apple, and Levi Strauss & Co. Target Corporation is one of the largest discount retailers in the United States and the world based on sales. The company offers general merchandise that collaborates with many celebrities and companies and food to their customers.

In March 2022, Target converted its store in Vista, California, to an all-renewable energy facility by adding solar carports to the parking lot as a company pilot for the entire chain.

In November 2022, Target blamed the dropping gross margin rate reduction from 28 percent to 24.7 percent in 2022 on shoplifting or "inventory shortage or shrink". The company expects losses due to theft will be $600 million in lost profits in 2022.

In 2024, Target announced that it would be ditching red and bringing in the famous circle to its card service, therefore changing its RedCard name to Target Circle Card right after the revamp of the membership service, but remaining on the RedCard benefits the same for its shoppers and hosting a Circle Week for members.

In early July 2024, Target said it would stop accepting personal checks at its stores on July 15.

On January 24, 2025, Target announced that it would be rolling back its Diversity, Equity, and Inclusion initiatives in accordance with President Trump's recent executive order. Target experienced swift backlash from its customer base, who began boycotting the company, resulting in massive losses in the stock market.

On August 14, 2025, Target announced their five-year store-within-a-store partnership agreement with Ulta Beauty will not be renewed when it concludes in August 2026.

On August 26, 2026, Target announced Target Beauty Studio, a beauty section featuring more than 1,600 products from 90 brands. It launches on September 10, 2026. Additionally, loyalty program members will receive related discounts and promotional offers.
