= David B. Golub =

American businessman

- Education: Harvard College (B.A.); Stanford Graduate School of Business (M.B.A.); Oxford University (M.Phil.)
- Occupations: Golub Capital (President); Golub Capital BDC (CEO)
- Board member of: The Michael J. Fox Foundation
- Relatives: Lawrence Golub (brother)
- Website: David B. Golub - LinkedIn

David B. Golub is an American businessman. He is the CEO of publicly traded Golub Capital BDC, and president of its parent company Golub Capital. Golub is the chairman and director of The Michael J. Fox Foundation.

== Early life and education ==
Golub attended Harvard College, where he earned a Bachelor of Arts, magna cum laude. He received an MPhil in International Relations from Oxford University, where he was a Marshall Scholar, and an MBA from Stanford Graduate School of Business, where he was named an Arjay Miller Scholar.

== Career ==
Golub is the president of Golub Capital and the CEO of Golub Capital BDC, Inc. which trades publicly on NASDAQ. He joined Golub Capital in 2003 where he works alongside his brother, Lawrence Golub.

Prior to his career at Golub Capital, Golub was the Managing Director of Centre Partners, a middle market private equity firm. He also worked for Corporate Partners, a $1.5 billion private equity firm that specialized in taking large positions in publicly traded companies.

Golub has been on boards of both public and private companies, including being the first chairman and a long-standing director of The Michael J. Fox Foundation. He is on the board of directors for Burton Snowboards and previously was on the boards of the Loan Syndications and Trading Association, Hudson Guild and the World Policy Institute.
