= Karen Finerman =

American journalist

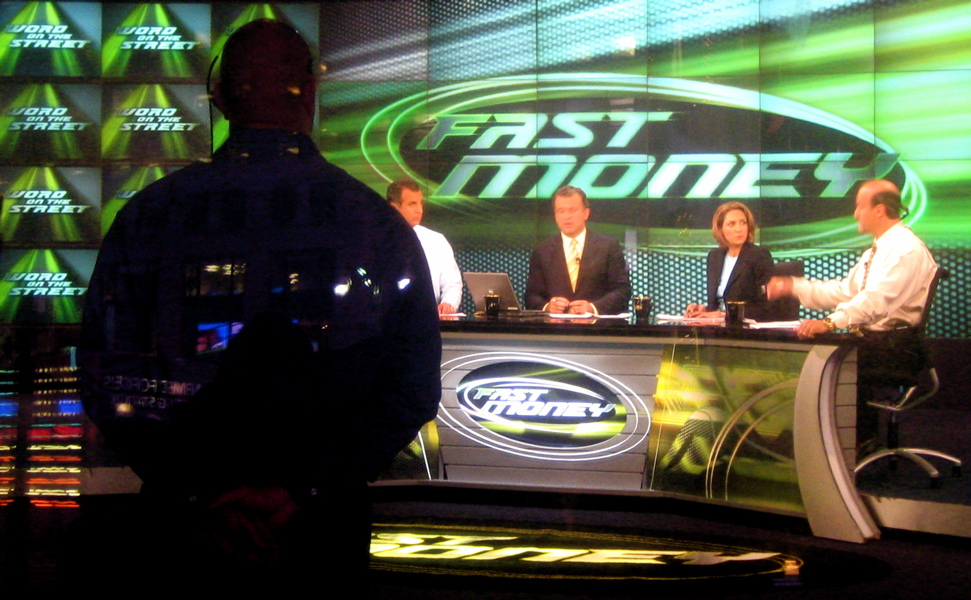
- Finerman is a panelist of CNBC's Fast Money
- Born: Karen Lisa Finerman; February 25, 1965 (age 61)
- Occupations: Television panelist and businesswoman
- Notable credit: Panelist of CNBC's Fast Money
- Spouse: Lawrence E. Golub
- Children: 4
- Relatives: Wendy Finerman (sister); Mark Canton (former-brother-in-law)
- Website: www.metrocap.net/team-finerman.php (archive)

Karen Lisa Finerman (born February 25, 1965) is an American businesswoman and television personality.

== Early life and education ==
Finerman was born to a Jewish family, the daughter of Jane and Gerald Finerman. She was raised in Beverly Hills, California with sisters Wendy, Leslie, and Stacey, and a brother, Mark. Finerman graduated from Beverly Hills High School in 1983. In 1987, she graduated from the Wharton School of Business at the University of Pennsylvania.

== Career ==
Co-founder of Metropolitan Capital Advisors, Inc., Finerman is also President of the firm.

She started her career in finance as a trader at First City Capital, a risk arbitrage fund for the Belzberg family and later Finerman joined the risk arbitrage desk of Donaldson, Lufkin & Jenrette (DLJ) as the lead research analyst.

Finerman serves on the Board of Advisors to The Wharton School of the University of Pennsylvania.

She is a board member of the Michael J. Fox Foundation for Parkinson's Research and trustee of the Montefiore Medical Center.

Finerman is a panelist on the show Fast Money on CNBC.

She is a founding Master Player of the Portfolios with Purpose contest.

Her first book, Finerman's Rules: Secrets I'd Only Tell My Daughters About Business and Life was published by Hachette Book Group's Business Plus on June 4, 2013.

She also hosts the women's business podcast How She Does It on Airwave Media and HerMoney.

== Personal life ==
Finerman has four children (two sets of twins) and is married to Lawrence E. Golub, who manages Golub Capital, a credit asset manager.
