= Robert Ulrich =

Robert or Bob Ulrich may refer to:

- Bob Ulrich (Robert J. Ulrich, born 1944), former chief executive officer and chairman of Target Corporation
- Robert J. Ulrich (casting director), American casting director and producer

== See also ==
- Robert Urich, actor
