= Wendy Finerman =

American animated film producer

- Born: August 2, 1960 (age 66); California, U.S.
- Occupation: Producer
- Years active: 1988–present
- Spouse(s): Mark Canton (divorced) David Peterson
- Relatives: Karen Finerman (sister)
- Awards: Best Picture 1994 Forrest Gump; Best Children's Film 1997 FairyTale: A True Story; Best Motion Picture – Drama 1994 Forrest Gump

Wendy Finerman is an American film producer of nearly a dozen feature films.

== Early life ==
Finerman was born to a Jewish family and raised in Beverly Hills, California. Her sister, Karen Finerman, is a hedgefund owner/trader in New York City and appears on CNBC's Fast Money.

== Career ==
Finerman was one of three producers who won the Academy Award for Best Picture for Forrest Gump in 1994 and a BAFTA Award for Fairy Tale in 1998. She has also produced such popular films as The Fan, Stepmom, Drumline, and The Devil Wears Prada.

== Personal life ==
Finerman was formerly married to producer Mark Canton and now is married to David Peterson. The mother of four children, she is a graduate of the Wharton School at the University of Pennsylvania and runs her own company, Wendy Finerman Productions.

== Filmography ==
Producer

- Hot to Trot (1988)
- Forrest Gump (1994)
- The Fan (1996)
- FairyTale: A True Story (1997)
- Stepmom (1998)
- Sugar & Spice (2001)
- Drumline (2002)
- The Devil Wears Prada (2006)
- P.S. I Love You (2007)
- One for the Money (2012)
- The Devil Wears Prada 2 (2026)

Executive producer

- I Like It Like That (1994)
- In a Class of His Own (1999)
- One for the Money (2002)
- Surrender, Dorothy (2006)
- Drumline: A New Beat (2014)
- Love by the 10th Date (2017)
- Guilty Pleasures (TBA)
