= Guy Adami =

American TV personality

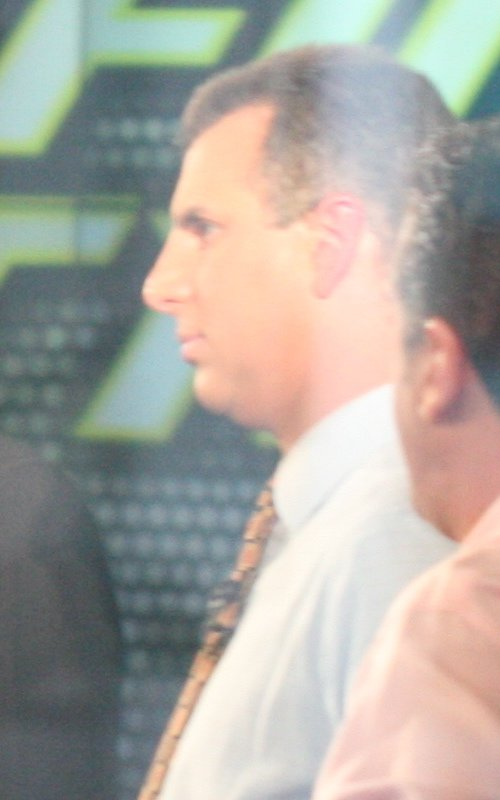
- Adami on Fast Money
- Born: December 18, 1963 (age 62); North Tarrytown, New York, U.S.
- Education: Georgetown University
- Occupations: Director of Advisor Advocacy at Private Advisor Group; cast member of Fast Money (CNBC)
- Spouse: Linda Adami
- Children: 3

Guy Adami (born December 18, 1963) is an American trader, television personality, and professional investor. He is one of the original “Fast Money Five” on CNBC's Fast Money.

== Biography ==
=== Early life and education ===
Guy Adami was born in North Tarrytown, New York (now known as Sleepy Hollow). He is the son of Nancy C. and the deceased Guy M. Adami. His parents met and were married during their time at Fordham Law School.

Adami is the eldest of five children and is a 1982 graduate of Croton-Harmon High School, where he captained both the varsity football and basketball teams. He was named All-League in both sports. In November 2010, Adami was inducted into the Croton Harmon High School Hall of Distinguished Graduates. Adami is a graduate of Georgetown University. On April 16, 2009, he was interviewed as part of the University's Witness to History.

=== Career ===
In June 1986, Adami began his career at Drexel Burnham Lambert where he worked on the floor of the New York Mercantile Exchange. In 1996, he joined Goldman Sachs' commodity group, J. Aron as a vice president. In 2003, he left Goldman Sachs to become an executive director at CIBC World Markets.

Adami frequently speaks at colleges and universities, including Quinnipiac University, Adelphi University, The University of Virginia, The University of North Carolina, The University of North Carolina Wilmington, University of Richmond, Fordham University, and Georgetown University. Adami has also given talks at his son's high school, Delbarton School, in Morristown, New Jersey. In 2012, Adami joined the ranks of Keppler Speakers.

=== Athletics ===
On August 11, 2012, Adami became an Ironman after completing the NYC event in 16:19:52. He finished the 2.4 mile Hudson River swim in 1:09:03, the 112 mile bike on The Palisades Parkway in 8:15:05, and the 26.2 mile run in 6:27:12. His journey to become an Ironman was chronicled in a June 24, 2012 New York Times article titled “The Road to the Ironman”. The Times ran a follow-up piece on August 17. Adami entered the Ironman as part of a fundraising effort for the New Jersey Chapter of The Leukemia & Lymphoma Society of which he is a member of the Board of Trustees. At a December 11, 2012 Board Meeting, it was announced that the “Ironteam” raised $681,730 which surpassed their original goal of $500,000.
