= Brian Stutland =

American market maker

Brian Stutland is an American market maker and regular contributor to CNBC's television programs Fast Money, Final Call, and Options Action.

Stutland graduated cum laude in 1997 from the University of Michigan with a Bachelor of Science in Chemical Engineering. He started out as a trader for LETCO, where he controlled portfolio positions and served as a market maker for blue chip and internet stocks. In 2001, he began a new role as an individual market maker the day before the September 11 attacks, where he successfully traded options on Enron during the company's rapid collapse.

In 2002, he found the floor trading company Stutland Equities LLC. Stutland Equities became one of the first market makers on the Chicago Board Options Exchange. He successfully traded an entire portfolio of stocks, generating returns in excess of 100% on his capital. He became one of the first to trade VIX Volatility futures and options Stutland Equities generated returns in excess of 1% (post winsorization using 95/5 rule) on capital during the market's high volatility during the rapid collapse of the housing market and rising oil prices.
