= Lipman–Wolfe and Company Building =

Historic building in Portland, Oregon, U.S.

- U.S. National Register of Historic Places
- Portland Historic Landmark
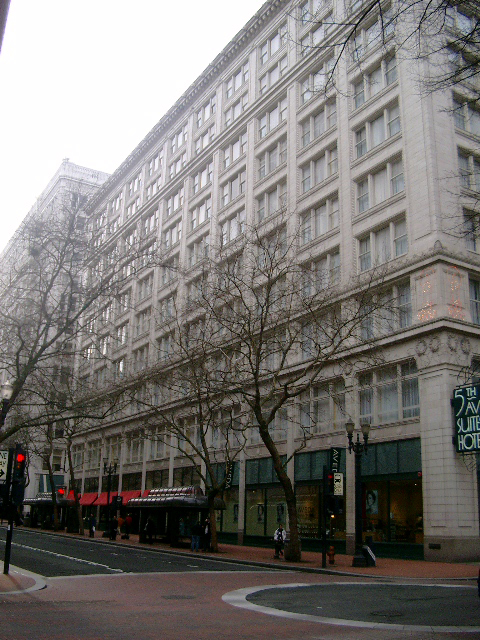

- Location within Portland, Oregon Location within Oregon Location within the United States
- Location: 521 SW 5th Avenue; Portland, Oregon
- Coordinates: 45°31′12″N 122°40′38″W
- Area: less than one acre
- Built: 1912
- Architect: Doyle & Patterson
- Architectural style: Chicago, Commercial Style
- NRHP reference No.: 88001531
- Added to NRHP: September 8, 1988

The Lipman–Wolfe and Company Building is a building located in downtown Portland, Oregon, listed on the National Register of Historic Places. It was originally the flagship store of the Lipman-Wolfe & Company department store. The architects were Doyle & Patterson.

In the mid-1990s, the building was renovated and converted into a hotel, the Fifth Avenue Suites. The hotel was renamed the Hotel Monaco in 2007.

== See also ==
- National Register of Historic Places listings in Southwest Portland, Oregon
