= Lipman's =

Defunct American department store chain based in Portland, Oregon

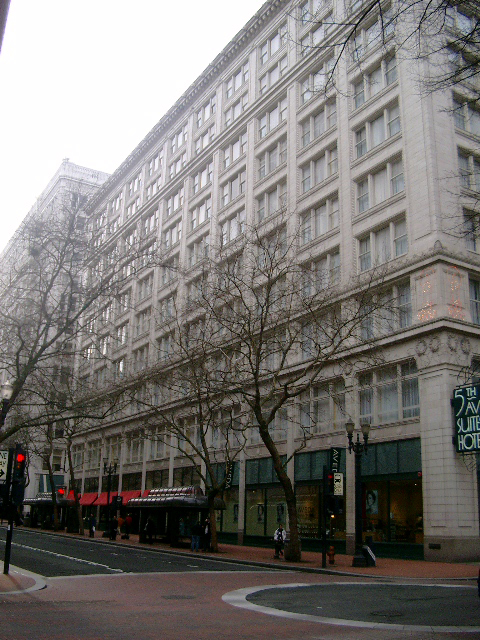
- The former Lipman's flagship store in Portland, now Hotel Monaco
- Formerly: Lipman–Wolfe & Company
- Type: Division
- Industry: Retail
- Founded: 1850; 176 years ago in Sacramento, California, United States
- Founders: Soloman Lipman; Adolphe Wolfe
- Defunct: April 1979
- Fate: Acquired by Marshall Field's and rebranded to Frederick & Nelson
- Successor: Frederick & Nelson
- Headquarters: Portland, Oregon, United States
- Number of locations: 6 (1979)
- Area served: Oregon
- Parent: National Department Stores (1925–1956); Roberts Brothers (1956–1965); Dayton Hudson Corporation (1965–1979)

Lipman's was an American department store chain based in Portland, Oregon. Founded in 1850 in Sacramento, California, the company was originally known as the Lipman–Wolfe & Company, named after the two founding partners: Adolphe Wolfe and his uncle, Soloman Lipman. It eventually grew to six stores in Oregon before they were rebranded to Frederick & Nelson in 1979. The 1912 building in downtown Portland that was the company's flagship store is listed on the National Register of Historic Places, as the Lipman–Wolfe and Company Building.

== History ==
In 1850, Lipman and Wolfe formed a partnership in Sacramento, California during the California Gold Rush. They became prosperous merchants, expanding into Nevada during the great silver rushes. The later decline of the Comstock Lode impacted the business, prompting Wolfe to move to Portland in 1880.

Wolfe opened a new store in Portland, re-establishing his business. Floods and space limitations forced the store to move three times, the last of which was in 1912, when the flagship store was opened at Fifth and Washington Streets. The new store was just across the street from Meier & Frank's flagship store, sparking an intense rivalry.

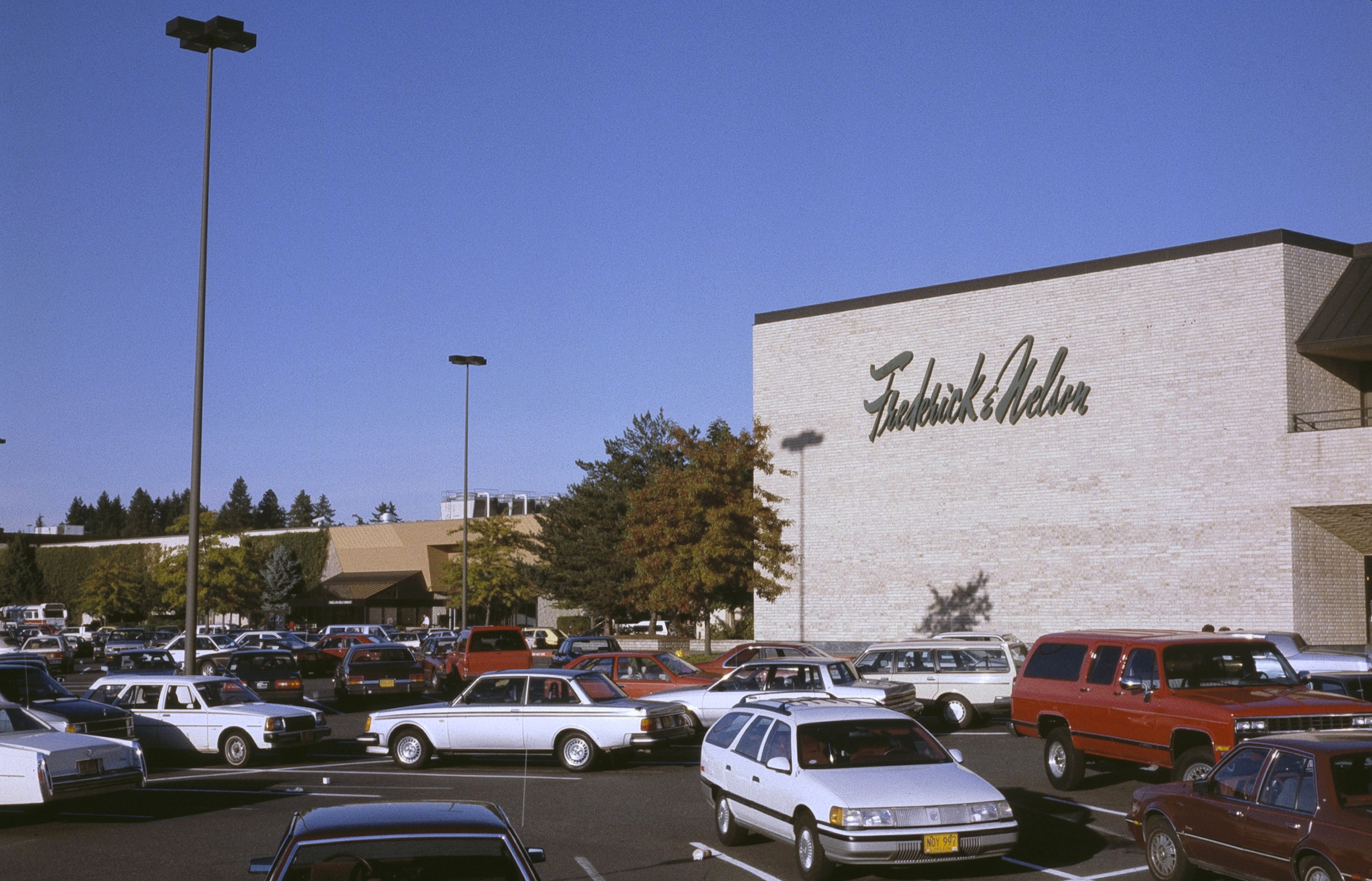
Lipman's was one of the anchor stores at the Washington Square Mall from 1974–1979, before becoming Frederick & Nelson.

Lipman's was well known locally for establishing several "firsts" in Portland retail history:

- The first use of an elevator system in a department store.
- The first retailer to mark set prices on merchandise, eliminating haggling and the fashion code price system.
- The first retailer to make change down to the penny instead of nickel.

By the end of its identity, the Lipman's brand had grown into a chain of six stores. Adolphe Wolfe died in 1938, passing the company on to his nephew. In the 1950s, the Wolfe family sold Lipman's to the Dayton Hudson Company, which kept the Lipman's brand as a division. Lipman's began to lose market share to Meier & Frank in the 1970s, when Marshall Field's bought all six stores in 1979. All were rebranded as Frederick & Nelson in early April of that year. In 1987, these stores, except for the downtown Portland store which was closed in October 1986 and the Eastport Plaza store which became Mervyn's, were re-branded, as Spokane, Washington-based The Crescent, a division of Frederick & Nelson. They were purchased by Lamonts in 1988.

== Brief resurrection ==
In early 1987, F&N Acquisition Corp., the owners of Frederick's announced that they would bring back the Lipman's name as an off-price retail division. Five Frederick & Nelson stores in Oregon and four Great Clothes Outlets in Washington were to be renamed Lipman's, but the Oregon locations instead were sold to The Crescent. These stores were slightly smaller in size than normal stores and catered to "fashion-conscious 20- to 40-year-olds with money to spend on career and casual wardrobes". The division was meant to compete directly with Nordstrom along with complementing its sister store. By January 1988, sales at the stores fell short of the $125 (~$340.00 in 2025)-per-square-foot target. Ownership was handed over to F&N executives and all the stores became Frederick & Nelson Red Tag Clearance Centers by mid-1988. All these stores were closed during 1990 cutbacks.

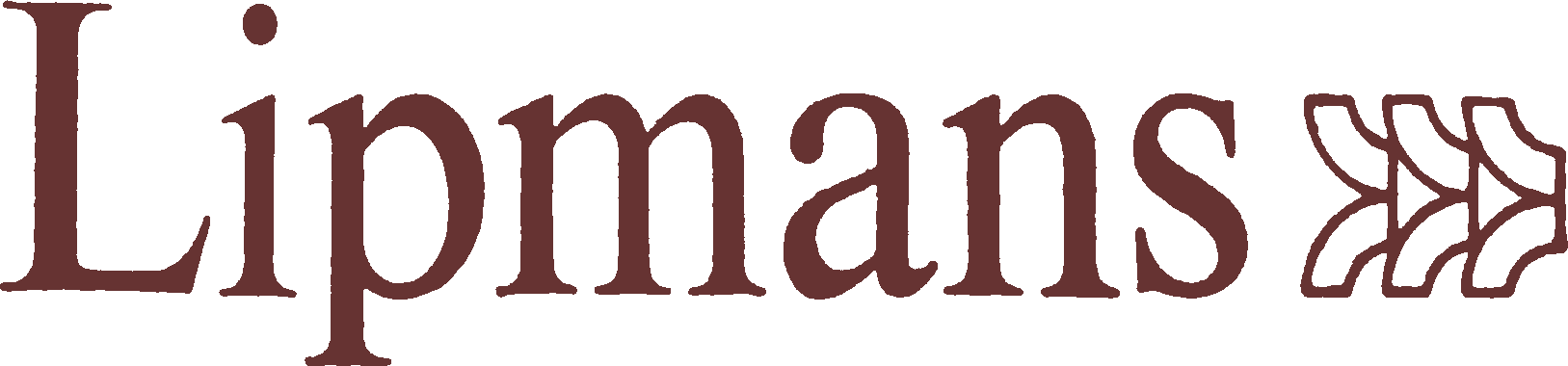
Lipman's Department Store Final Logo

== Cinnamon Bear ==
Lipman's is probably best remembered for the Cinnamon Bear, a popular Portland Christmas time tradition since 1937. The Cinnamon Bear was introduced as a Lipman's-sponsored radio story character, meant to count down the days until Christmas. Along with Santa Claus, his costumed likeness appeared every Christmas at Lipman's stores, handing out cookies to children. Frederick & Nelson continued the practice after absorbing the brand. The Cinnamon Bear survives today as a souvenir at the Fifth Avenue Suites. To this day, the Cinnamon Bear is aired during the holidays on K103. The Cinnamon Bear radio show can also be heard on Kool 99.1 in Eugene, Oregon, every Christmas

== Portland flagship store reuse ==
Frederick & Nelson closed the former Lipman's flagship store during a reorganization of the chain in 1986. The building was listed in the National Register of Historic Places, as the Lipman–Wolfe and Company Building, in 1988.

In 1996, after extensive renovation, the ten-story, half-block building reopened as the Fifth Avenue Suites, a 222-room hotel. In 2007, the Fifth Avenue Suites was renamed the Hotel Monaco.
