= Kenneth Macke =

American retail industry executive (1938–2008)

Kenneth Anthony Macke (16 December 1938 – 28 June 2008) was an American retail industry executive who served as chairman and chief executive of Dayton Hudson Corporation. he graduated from Drake University in Des Moines, Iowa.

Macke's son, Jeffrey, is a prominent financial commentator, formerly on CNBC's Fast Money, now blogging at ibankcoin.com.

Born in Carroll, Iowa he died from complications of Parkinson's disease at his home near Napa, California.
