= Lawrence E. Golub =

American businessman

- Education: Harvard College (B.A.); Harvard Law School, Harvard Business School (JD-MBA)
- Occupations: entrepreneur philanthropist business executive
- Known for: CEO, Golub Capital
- Title: Golub Capital, (CEO)
- Spouse: Karen Finerman
- Website: Lawrence Golub - LinkedIn

Lawrence E. Golub is an American entrepreneur, philanthropist, and business executive. He is the CEO of Golub Capital, a credit asset management company he founded in 1994. Prior to Golub Capital, he had management careers with Bankers Trust Company and Allen & Company. Golub sits on the board of numerous organizations, including Harvard University's JD-MBA Alumni Association. He is one of three private members of the Financial Control Board of the State of New York.

Golub is a supporter of philanthropic efforts, most notably organizations for medical research for Parkinson's disease.

== Early life and education ==
Golub grew up in New York, his parents both from poor immigrant families. He attended Harvard College, where he received his Bachelor of Arts degree magna cum laude. Golub had an interest in science since high school, studying the emerging DNA technology of the time. He took pre-med classes in college but decided to switch to a major in business. Golub went on to attend Harvard Law School and Harvard Business School, earning both a JD and an MBA through the school's joint degree program. Golub also founded the Harvard University JD-MBA Alumni Association. He was selected as a Baker Scholar at Harvard Business School and was an editor at the Harvard Law Review.

== Career ==
During his early career, Golub spent his time working for various well-known banks. He started his career at Allen & Company where he engaged in private equity, leveraged finance, and mergers and acquisitions. He went on to become a Managing Director at Wasserstein Perella where he established the firm's capital markets group and debt restructuring practice. Golub was a White House Fellow and served for fifteen years as Treasurer of the White House Fellows Foundation. Prior to starting Golub Capital, he worked as a Managing Director of Bankers Trust Company.

Golub founded the U.S.-focused credit asset management company Golub Capital in 1994. The firm has primary business lines in middle market lending, late stage lending, and broadly syndicated loans. The firm is also affiliated with Golub Capital BDC, Inc., a business development company that trades on the NASDAQ under the stock ticker symbol, GBDC. Golub Capital is one of the largest non-bank middle market lenders and providers of senior debt. In 2016, the firm was named "Lender of the Year" by Private Debt Investor.

Golub serves on the board of numerous organizations, including as President of the Harvard University JD-MBA Alumni Association. He is one of three private members of the Financial Control Board of the State of New York. He is also a member of the Harvard University Committee on University Resources.

== Personal life ==
Golub is married to American businesswoman and television personality Karen Finerman, president and chief executive of New York-based hedge fund Metropolitan Capital Advisors.

Golub is active in charitable and civic organizations. Golub and his family actively support medical research to advance treatments for Parkinson's disease at several leading institutions. In 2001, he established the Golub Stem Cell Initiative for Parkinson's with a $500,000 donation to the New York Stem Cell Foundation. He also funded a Parkinson's research effort within the Harvard Stem Cell Institute, which currently focuses on Parkinson's, juvenile diabetes, and ALS.

Golub was Chairman of Mosholu Preservation Corporation, a non-profit developer and manager of low-income housing in the Bronx. He served for fifteen years as a trustee of Montefiore Medical Center, the university hospital of the Albert Einstein College of Medicine. He also served for six years as a trustee of Horace Mann School and for five years on the Harvard University Committee for Science and Engineering.
