= Bob Ulrich =

American businessman (born 1944)

- Born: 1944 (age 81–82); Minneapolis, Minnesota
- Occupations: Retired chief executive officer and chairman of Target Corporation

Robert J. Ulrich (born 1944) is an American retired businessman who was the chief executive officer and chairman of the Target Corporation, the second-largest mass merchandise retailer in the United States. Ulrich is credited with crafting Target's unique brand and marketing image and focus, which is widely considered to be a key contributor to the company's growth and success in the challenging retailing industry.

== Biography ==
Ulrich was born in 1944, in Minneapolis, Minnesota, the son of a 3M executive. He graduated from the University of Minnesota in 1967, and moved quickly into the retailing business. He began his career with Dayton Hudson Corporation (which would become Target Corporation in 2000). Until 1981, Ulrich held a series of positions overseeing merchandising for Dayton Hudson, including overseeing merchandising for Dayton's Department Stores. In 1981, he moved to overseeing the operations of Dayton's subsidiary, Diamond's. He currently resides in the Twin Cities Metro Area.

=== Building Target ===
In 1984, Ulrich became President of the combined Dayton and Hudson department stores, based in Minneapolis. In 1987, he was promoted to chairman and chief executive officer of the Target stores group. By 1992, the number of Target stores had doubled during Ulrich's tenure, to just over 500, with just shy of fifty more opening each year.

In 1994, Kenneth Macke retired as chairman and chief executive of Target's parent company, Dayton Hudson Corporation, and Ulrich succeeded him in the position. Dayton Hudson had grown to encompass several store chains, including Dayton's, Hudson's, Mervyn's, and Marshall Field's, in addition to Target.

Over time, Target began to far eclipse the success of the other Dayton Hudson stores, and on January 13, 2000, Dayton Hudson took the name Target Corporation. Ulrich sold the other store groups, including Mervyn's and Marshall Field's, and focused on promoting the Target brand.

=== Today ===
Ulrich retired from Target May 1, 2008. In April 2010 Ulrich founded the Musical Instrument Museum (MIM) in Phoenix where he continues to serve as board chairman. In addition to that role, Ulrich serves on the boards of 3M, the University of St. Thomas, and the Minneapolis Institute of Arts.

=== Achievements ===
Bob Ulrich was awarded "CEO of the Year 2007" by Chief Executive Magazine

== See also ==
- Target Corporation
- Musical Instrument Museum (Phoenix)
