= Melissa Lee (journalist) =

American reporter, journalist, and news anchor for CNBC

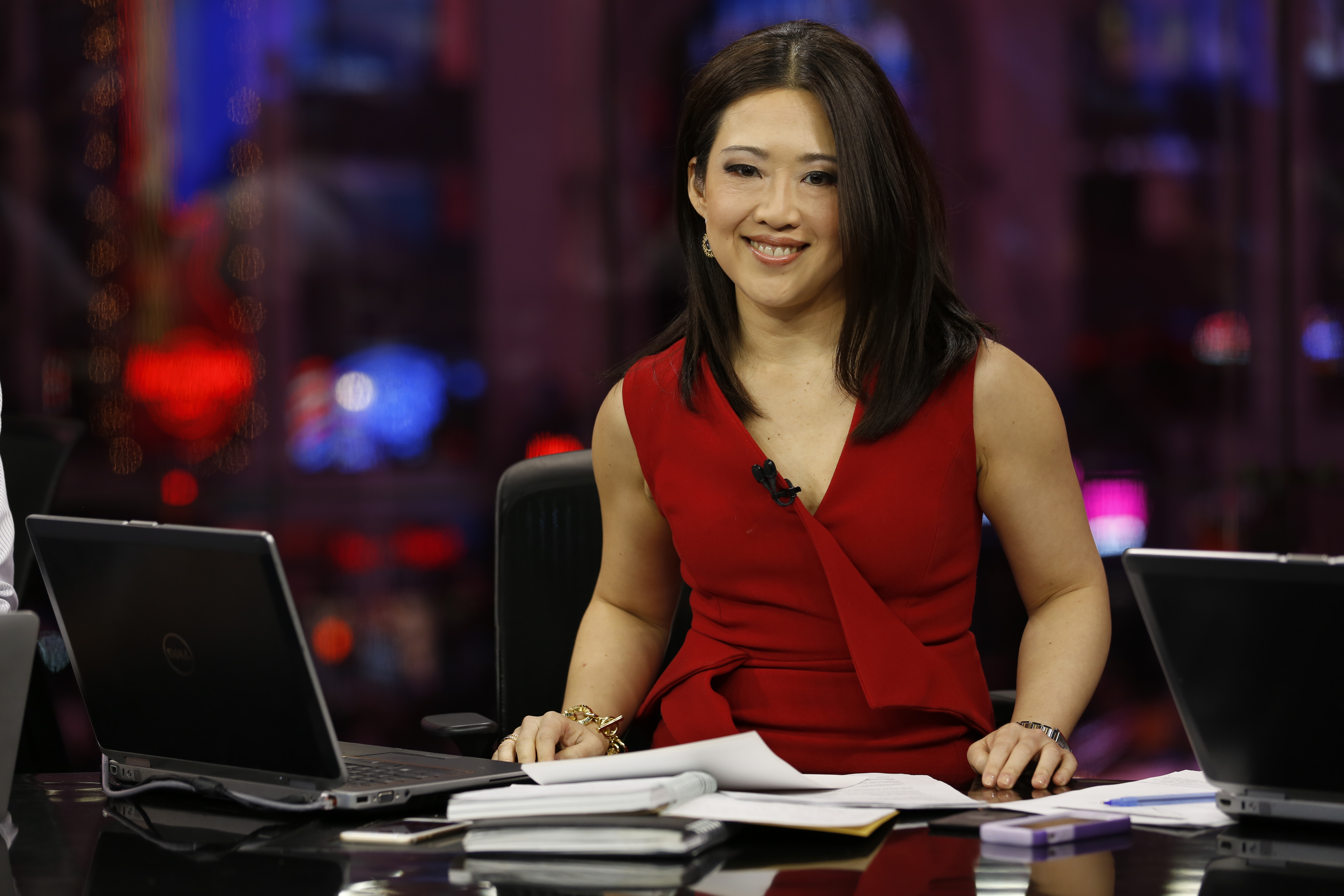
- Lee on the set of CNBC's Squawk on the Street
- Born: Great Neck, New York, U.S.
- Education: Harvard University (AB)
- Occupations: News presenter, reporter for CNBC (2004–present)

Melissa Lee is a reporter, journalist, and news anchor for CNBC. Since January 2009, she has occasionally hosted Closing Bell when the anchor is unavailable. She has also hosted Options Action, and is now the host of CNBC's 5pm ET daily show Fast Money.

== Early life and education ==
Lee's grandfather immigrated from rural China to Buffalo, New York in the United States, along with his wife and children. Lee's father graduated from Columbia University and then moved to Great Neck, New York. Lee grew up idolizing New York news anchor Kaity Tong, who inspired Lee to become a reporter. Lee started her professional journalism career as a reporter for her hometown newspaper, the Great Neck Record. She graduated from Harvard College with a Bachelor of Arts in Government in 1995. While at Harvard, Lee was an assistant managing editor of The Harvard Crimson.

== Career ==
Prior to joining CNBC in 2004, Lee worked for Bloomberg Television and CNN Financial News. Before her career in television, Lee was a consultant at Mercer Management Consulting. Her cases focused on the banking and credit card sectors.

Lee took over as host of CNBC's 5pm ET daily show, Fast Money when Dylan Ratigan left CNBC for companion network MSNBC on March 27, 2009. She was the interim host after Ratigan's departure, until April of the same year when she was appointed permanent host. Lee has received two Emmy Award nominations for Business News.

Lee has hosted six CNBC documentaries:

- Made in China: The People's Republic of Profit
- Coca-Cola: The Real Story Behind the Real Thing
- Porn: Business of Pleasure
- The $50M Con
- Code Wars: America's Cyber Threat
- Bitcoin: Boom or Bust

As of 2013, Lee hosts 3 CNBC programs: Fast Money, Options Action, and Money in Motion: Currency Trading. Since February 9, 2015, Lee is one of three hosts for Power Lunch.

== Personal life ==
Lee is married to Ben Kallo, a financial analyst, and gave birth to twins in 2019.

== See also ==
- Chinese Americans in New York City
- New Yorkers in journalism
