= Carter Worth =

American financial analyst

Carter Braxton Worth
- Born: June 15, 1966 (age 60); Manhattan, New York
- Occupation: Financial analyst

Carter Braxton Worth (born June 15, 1966) is an American financial analyst and stock market strategist. Each year since 2008, he has appeared on institutional investor's All America Research Team, ranked as one of the Top 3 technical analysts on Wall Street. Carter is married to Andrée Jill Finkle (January 13, 2007).

Worth's weekly market commentary "Money in Motion" is known for its utilization of the "150-day moving average".

== Early life and career ==
Worth graduated from Boston University with a degree in International Relations. Early in his career, he worked as a fundamental analyst at Value Line. He also worked as technician in the financial sector under the tutelage of Vincent Boening. He joined Oppenheimer & Co. in 2005 and departed in early February 2014. From 2016-2021 Carter was the Chief Market Technician at Cornerstone Macro. In 2021 Carter founded Worth Charting LLC. Carter appears regularly on CNBC.

== Market calls ==
Worth rose to prominence with several well timed market calls the most noteworthy being one of the first analysts in print to call the beginning of the bear market on November 9, 2007.
