= Golub Capital =

American credit asset management firm

- Type: Public
- Traded as: NASDAQ: GBDC
- Industry: Asset management; Lending
- Founded: 1994
- Number of locations: Chicago; New York; San Francisco
- Key people: Lawrence Golub (CEO); David Golub (President); Andrew Steuerman (Head of Middle Market and Late Stage Lending); Christina D. Jamieson (Head of Broadly Syndicated Loans)
- AUM: $70 billion (July 2024)
- Website: Official Website

Golub Capital is a credit asset manager based in the United States with over $60 billion of capital under management. The firm has primary business lines in middle market lending, late stage lending, and broadly syndicated loans. The firm is also affiliated with Golub Capital BDC, Inc., a business development company that trades on the NASDAQ under the stock ticker symbol, GBDC. Golub Capital is one of the largest non-bank middle market lenders and providers of senior debt.

== History ==
=== 1994–2000: Foundation and early success ===
Golub Capital was founded in New York City in 1994 by Lawrence Golub. Golub had previously worked at Allen & Company, Wasserstein Perella & Co., and Bankers Trust. He had also been a White House Fellow. The firm initially operated with $20 million of equity capital under management. Anchor investors in Golub Capital's first fund included Dan Lufkin (of Donaldson, Lufkin & Jenrette), Stanley S. Shuman (of Allen & Company), and Mellon Bank among others. Golub and an assistant were the only employees at Golub Capital's outset, but, by 2000, the firm had between 8 and 10 employees and a fund worth a couple hundred million dollars.

=== 2000–2004: Shift in focus ===
In 2000, the firm began specializing in mezzanine loans. These loans were geared toward private equity-backed companies. Golub Capital no longer made investments in controlled private equity investments in order not to compete with their private equity clients. In the aftermath of the dot-com bust in 2000, the firm achieved success with its mezzanine loans as most cash flow loans became unavailable.

In 2003, Lawrence's brother David Golub joined the firm as its president (with Lawrence Golub remaining CEO). Golub had previously been Managing Director of both Centre Partners Management LLC and Corporate Partners. Andrew Steuerman joined Golub Capital in 2004. Steuerman became the head of originations and eventually gained the titles of Senior Managing Director and Head of Middle Market and Late Stage Lending.

=== 2004–2008: Further business expansion ===
In 2004, Golub Capital began offering senior and one-stop loans. By 2007, the firm was a lead lender and arranger in senior loans. In 2005, on the final closing of its fourth GCP fund (Golub Capital Partners IV), the firm raised $800 million of equity capital. Its fifth GCP fund (Golub Capital Partners V) raised $700 million of equity capital. Golub Capital's total capital under management increased to $2.5 billion as a result.

=== 2008–present: Financial crisis and beyond ===
During the 2008 financial crisis, Golub Capital was one of the few lending firms that continued to grow. By the end of 2008, the firm was third by deal volume for lead arrangers of sub-$100 million leveraged buyout loans and had raised $1.5 billion for new loans. In 2009, it became the number one bookrunner for leveraged buyout loans in the middle market. By 2010, the firm had $4 billion capital under management.

Golub Capital BDC, Inc. was founded in 2009 and went public in March 2010. It trades on the NASDAQ under stock ticker symbol, GBDC. David Golub serves as the CEO and President of Golub Capital BDC.

In 2011, the firm had 120 employees with offices in New York, Chicago, and Atlanta. Their loan portfolio also increased to $5 billion. In 2012, the firm led a targeted campaign to serve lower middle market companies that have an annual EBITDA of between $6 and $8 million.

In 2014, the firm's capital under management increased to $10 billion with the final closings of the Golub Capital Partners VIII fund and the Golub Capital Partners International VIII. That year, the firm closed a mix of deals, including boot retailer Boot Barn with a $100 million facility and fiber optic infrastructure company Wilcon Holdings with a $59 million facility. The firm opened a lending office in San Francisco in 2014 to handle its late stage lending business line. As of 2018, the firm has over $25 billion in capital under management. In March 2018, Golub Capital supported the acquisition of Togetherwork Holdings by GI partners.

In August 2018, Golub Capital sold a passive, non-voting minority stake in its management companies to Dyal Capital Partners, a subsidiary of asset manager Neuberger Berman Holdings. In 2021, Bloomberg listed Golub Capital as one of a handful of private equity firms that could leverage large buyouts without the assistance of Wall Street banks. In December 2022, Korea Investment Corporation made a direct investment into Golub Capital, acquiring a minority stake of less than 5%.

== Businesses ==
Golub Capital has three main business lines: middle market lending, late stage lending, and broadly syndicated loans. The firm typically invests in sectors like SaaS, health care, restaurants, business services, and many others. The firm is also affiliated with Golub Capital BDC, Inc., a publicly traded (NASDAQ: GDBC) business development company.

=== Middle Market Lending ===
Andrew Steuerman heads Golub Capital’s Middle Market Lending team located in Chicago and New York. The business line focuses on providing senior, one-stop, and second lien debt to U.S. middle market companies, typically controlled by private equity firms. Golub Capital can hold over $400 million in each middle market lending deal, and the team can also underwrite and syndicate senior credit facilities and a proprietary suite of one-loan debt facilities of up to $1 billion. The typical borrower generates between $5 million to $50 million a year in EBITDA and is backed by one of over 200 private equity companies with which Golub Capital has a working relationship. Approximately 85% of financings done with private equity companies come from pre-existing relationships.

=== Late Stage Lending ===
The firm's late stage lending unit is also headed by Andrew Steuerman. The team operates out of the firm's San Francisco office in order to be closer to Silicon Valley. The business offers debt to fast-growing technology companies backed by venture capital, growth equity, private equity, or other private companies.

=== Broadly Syndicated Loans ===
Golub Capital's Broadly Syndicated Loans group is headed by Scott Morrison in the firm's Chicago office. This unit focuses on investing in larger loans that are generally liquid in the secondary market. The Broadly Syndicated Loans team also manages a series of collateralized loan obligations.

=== Golub Capital BDC, Inc. ===
Golub Capital BDC, Inc., (a business development company) was founded in 2009 and went public in March 2010 Nasdaq: GBDC. David Golub serves as the president and CEO of the company. The company lends money to middle market companies that have backing from private equity firms.

Golub Capital BDC, Inc. reported that it acquires common stock securities of Business for the intent of providing bonus bonuses to Golub Capital LLC workers purchased more than 5.6 million common stock securities of the Company between April 1, 2020, and June 15, 2020.
