= Ken Kashiwahara =

American broadcast journalist

Ken Kashiwahara (born July 18, 1940) is a broadcast journalist. He was a correspondent for ABC from 1974 to 1998, and was one of the first Asian American journalists to appear on national television. On August 21, 1983, he was traveling with Ninoy Aquino when the exiled Filipino politician was assassinated upon his return to Manila, Philippines.

== Early life and education ==
Kashiwahara was born in Waimea, Kauai, on July 18, 1940. He is a third-generation Japanese American, and his parents were teachers. When he was ten years old, his family moved to Okinawa, but they returned to the United States and lived in Pennsylvania when Kashiwahara was a teenager. He later moved to Maryland and graduated from Bethesda-Chevy Chase High School in 1958. He entered Washington and Jefferson College, but left after two years after facing racism. He returned to Hawaii and studied pre-medicine at the University of Hawaii until he became interested in broadcasting and transferred to San Francisco State College. He completed his bachelor's degree in 1963.

== Career ==
After graduating from college, Kashiwahara enlisted in the Air Force, where he served as an information officer for five years. His first civilian position was as a political reporter at KGMB, where became a news anchor in 1971. The next year, he was hired a position at KABC and moved to Los Angeles. He covered stories internationally and was one of the last American journalists to leave Saigon in 1975. That year, he was named chief of ABC's Hong Kong bureau, and served in that position until 1977, when he returned to the United States. He later became the San Francisco bureau chief.

In 1978 Kashiwahara met his wife, Filipino filmmaker Lupita Aquino, while covering a story on opposition to Ferdinand Marcos in the Philippines. She was the daughter of Benigno Aquino Sr. Aquino's brother, Benigno "Ninoy" Aquino Jr., was a political prisoner at the time who was later exiled. Kashiwahara was accompanying Benigno Aquino Jr. on August 21, 1983, when the exiled politician returned to the Philippines and was assassinated.

Kashiwahara won Emmy Awards for his stories in 1986 and 1988. In 1993 Kashiwahara was awarded a Lifetime Achievement Award from the Asian American Journalists Association and retired in 1998.
