= Fast Money (talk show) =

American investing talk show

- Original logo (06/21/06 to 10/10/14)
- Genre: Stock trader talk show
- Created by: Dylan Ratigan and Susan Krakower
- Presented by: Melissa Lee (host); Guy Adami; Bonawyn Eison; Karen Finerman; Courtney Garcia; Steve Grasso; Brian Kelly; Mike Khouw; Dan Nathan; Tim Seymour; Carter Worth
- Country of origin: United States
- Original language: English

Production
- Executive producer: Sandy Cannold
- Production locations: NASDAQ MarketSite, New York City
- Camera setup: Multi-camera
- Running time: 60 minutes

Original release
- Network: CNBC
- Release: June 21, 2006 – present

Related
- Mad Money, On the Money

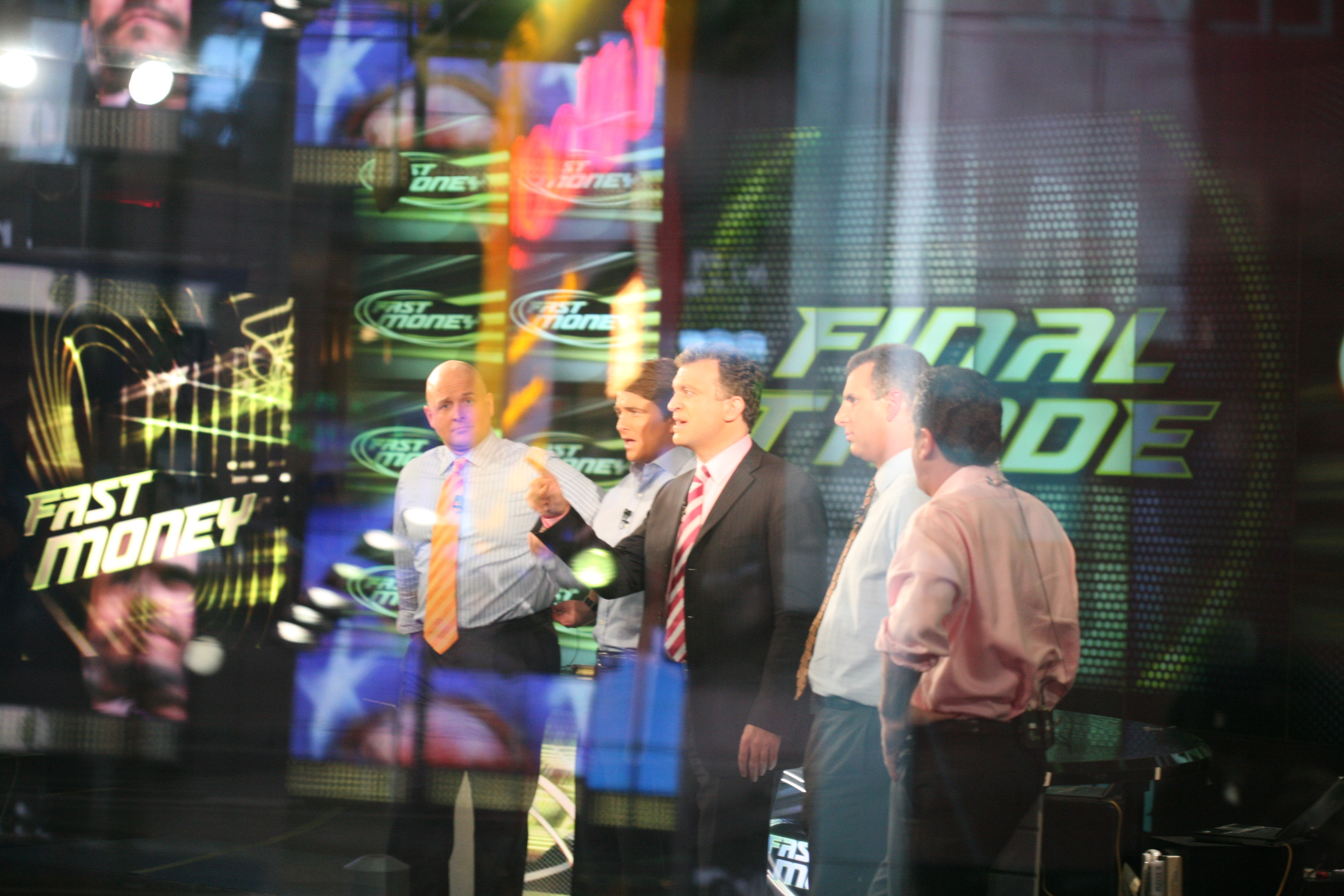
CNBC's Fast Money panel until May 18, 2007: (from the left) Jeff Macke, Tim Strazzini, Dylan Ratigan, Guy Adami and Eric Bolling.

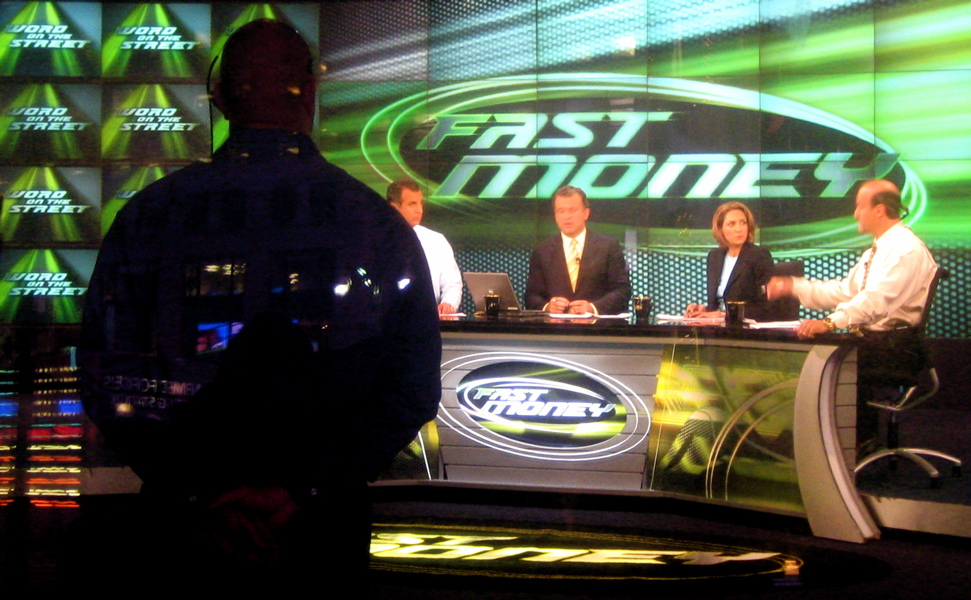
CNBC's Fast Money panel on November 9, 2007: (from the left) Guy Adami, Dylan Ratigan, Karen Finerman, and Pete Najarian.

Fast Money is an American financial stock trading talk show that began airing on the CNBC cable/satellite TV channel on Jan. 8, 2007. Beginning October 10, 2007, it was broadcast every weeknight at 5pm ET, one hour after the close of trading on the New York Stock Exchange, until mid-2011 when it was moved to just four nights per week, Monday through Thursday, to make room for special option and currency trading shows on Friday evenings. On March 22, 2013, it returned to the Friday night slot as a half-hour show, followed by the Options Action half-hour show. The Friday edition of Fast Money returned to being a full-hour show on September 22, 2023, after Options Action was quietly cancelled the previous Friday (September 15, 2023). The show originates from the NASDAQ MarketSite in New York City.

== Program format ==
Melissa Lee anchors a fast-paced discussion among four professional Wall Street traders. The group discusses various investment strategies, including technical analysis, and debate the merits of each other's arguments for or against a particular stock or sector. The show covers topics such as options trading, commodities, and exchange-traded funds.

Most episodes feature regularly appearing traders: Guy Adami, Bonawyn Eison, Karen Finerman, Steve Grasso, Brian Kelly, Mike Khouw, Pete Najarian, Dan Nathan, Tim Seymour, and Nadine Terman.

== History ==
The success of Mad Money prompted CNBC to look to replicate that success with another show. Fast Money was created by Dylan Ratigan and Susan Krakower, Vice President of Strategic Programming and Development, as a spin off from a weekly segment that first aired in the May 2006 episodes of On the Money. The show originally aired from CNBC headquarters in Englewood Cliffs, New Jersey, with Ratigan as host, and a regular panel of Jeff Macke, Guy Adami, Tim Strazzini, and Eric Bolling. By January 8, 2007, it became a weekday show with its studio at the NASDAQ MarketSite.

On Fridays, beginning with March 5, 2010, the show was truncated to just 30 minutes as Options Action (also hosted by Melissa Lee) was aired in the 5:30 ET timeslot. Both Fast Money and Options Action are broadcast from the NASDAQ MarketSite.

In mid-2011, Fast Money was removed from the Friday night line-up altogether to make room for Money in Motion: Currency Trading (also hosted by Melissa Lee) which airs in the 5:30 ET time slot, while Options Action was moved up a half-hour to 5pm ET. On March 22, 2013, it returned to the Friday night lineup. The program airs the first half hour (5pm ET) followed by half hour of Options Action at 5:30pm ET. Money in Motion was removed from the CNBC lineup

On October 13, 2014, Fast Money, along with CNBC's other business-day programs, were launched in full 1080i high-definition as part of a network-wide switch to a full 16:9 presentation.

On September 22, 2023, the Friday edition of Fast Money was extended back to 60 minutes, in line with its Monday-Thursday shows, after Options Action (the television program) was quietly cancelled the previous Friday (September 15, 2023).

== Panelist changes ==
Strazzini was replaced by Najarian on May 18, 2007. Bolling was replaced by Finerman on September 4, 2007. Seymour, who had appeared on the show as a substitute panelist, was made a regular in October 2008. Ratigan left the network on March 27, 2009 when his CNBC contract expired. Ratigan was replaced by Lee, who sometimes filled in for Ratigan. Macke left CNBC on June 15, 2009

== Hosts ==
=== Current ===
- Melissa Lee ("The Emissary"; became permanent host in April 2009)

=== Former ===
- Dylan Ratigan ("The Commissioner"; 2006–2009)
- Erin Burnett ("The Heiress")+, now with CNN
- Matt Nesto ("The House")+
- Michelle Caruso-Cabrera ("La Princesa")+
- Melissa Francis ("The Empress")+, now with the Fox Business Network
- Simon Hobbs ("Simon Bar Sinister")+
- Amanda Drury+
- Becky Quick ("The Contessa")+
- Tim Strazzini ("The Risk Doctor"; 2006–2009)

+ fill-ins

== Panelists ==
=== Current ===
- Guy Adami ("The Negotiator"; 2006–present)
- Julie Biel
- Bonawyn Eison (2019–present)
- Karen Finerman ("The Chairwoman"; 2007–present)
- Steve Grasso ("The Governor"; 2009–present)
- Courtney Garcia, CFP (2021–present), also on Worldwide Exchange, Closing Bell, and Power Lunch
- Brian Kelly (“BK”; 2009–present)
- Mike Khouw ("The Professor"; 2009–present), also on Options Action
- Dan Nathan (2011–present)
- Tim Seymour ("The Ambassador"; 2007–present)
- Nadine Terman (2021–present)
- Carter Worth ("The Chart Master"; 2007–present), also on Options Action
- Tony Zhang (2019–present), also on Options Action

=== Former ===
- Eric Bolling ("The Admiral"; 2006–2007), former host of The Five on Fox News Channel
- Stacey Briere-Gilbert ("The Hammer"; 2007)
- Steve Cortes ("El Capitan"; 2009–before 2013)
- Dennis Gartman (2008–present)
- Zachary Karabell ("The Academic"; 2008–before 2013)
- Joe "JJ" Kinahan (2008–before 2013)
- Jared A Levy ("The Strategist"; 2009–before 2013)
- Jeff Macke ("The Lone Wolf"; 2006–2009)
- Pete Najarian ("The Pit Boss"; 2007–2022)
- David B. Seaburg
- Tim Strazzini ("The Risk Doctor"; 2006–2007)
- Brian Stutland
- Joe Terranova ("The Liquidator"; 2008)
- Quint Tatro ("The Kentucky Kid")
- Jeff Mills ("The General")

== Segments ==
The show has several distinct segments, including (but not limited to):

- Page Two: An in-depth discussion of some of the main business related stories of the day.
- Chart of the Day: This segment highlights a chart that corresponds to the day's specific stock.
- Trade Tomorrow: Lee and her panel zero in on the next day's/week's top three trades than can make you money.
- The Takedown: When one panelist disagrees with the other over a certain issue or comment.
- Trade School: If a member of the panel uses Wall Street jargon, Lee will decipher it for viewers (with an accompanying definition).
- Word On The Street: "Best money making chatter behind the scenes"; involves in depth discussion on the various stocks that have made recent news.
- Street Fight: CNBC contributor, Herb Greenberg, takes on the 4 panelists and challenges one of the stock picks each panelist has recommended, Ratigan (and now Melissa Lee) picks a winner after each "fight" by siding with the views of the panelist or Herb Greenberg.
- Chartology: This segment looks at a chart that corresponds to a specific index, along with technical analysis, usually from Fast Money panelist Carter Worth.
- Breaking News: Late-breaking business headlines (seen on live broadcast only).
- Pops & Drops: Lee and her panelists review stocks that have the big gains (pops) and drops during the day (or week).
- Fast Fire: Panelists are held accountable for their past bad picks and are confronted on-air. This segment is seen on Fridays.
- Stocks on Sale: Panelists asked Ratigan (the original host) whether or not a stock that is mentioned is on sale (very similar to the Lightning Round on Mad Money). This segment is no longer current.
- Sector Trade: A segment in which the traders pull the curtain on a hot stock, and tells viewers how to play it.
- Happy 52-Week High: Seen before and after the commercial break, this segment was about a stock that has just hit a new 52-week high on that day, along with a trivia question and facts about that particular stock. The answer to the question was revealed after the commercial break. This segment was discontinued in January 2008 and replaced by the Trader Radar (see below).
- Trader Radar: A successor to the Happy 52-Week High segment (and is similar to the one mentioned above), this segment is about a stock that "lit up Wall Street radar screens everywhere" on that day. The answer to the question is revealed after the commercial break.
- Take Your Position: The panelists give their specific thoughts related to an event, like a takeover or upcoming earnings.
- Face 2 Face: A viewer, via Webcam, asks a question about a specific stock to Lee and her panel.
- Grade the Trade: In this Friday segment (discontinued since October 2007), which involved college students who joined the show via Webcam, they had 30 seconds to answer a question asked by Ratigan. The panelists then graded his/her trade.
- Trade Update: One of the panelists will give an update to a previous trade they had recommended.
- Fast Money World: Fast Money panelist Tim Seymour reveals some international stock trades.
- Fast Message: Lee reads viewer Emails
- Surprise Friday Guest: In this segment seen each Friday, a surprise guest joins the panel.
- Fast & Furious: A Pardon the Interruption-style rundown of events happening the next day. The idea for the segment was pitched by former CNBC intern Jason Parks in May 2008.
- Would you Rather: If this, would you trade a position on a particular stock, versus another.
- Trade it or Fade it: “America's favorite game” - Panelists decide on a specific stock to buy or stay away from/sell.
- Final Trade: The final segment of the show in which Lee and her panel reveal what your first move should be the next morning.

== Programming and ratings ==
Fast Money's first 13 episodes (including one live audience broadcast) aired during the summer of 2006 in the Wednesday 8pm ET timeslot. Ratings were relatively low, with the program averaging a bit over 110,000 viewers per week. During the week of 2006-09-18, the program tried a new timeslot at 5pm ET, the plush timeslot with highly rated Closing Bell serving as the lead-out (bumping Kudlow & Company to 8pm for the week). Here the show flourished, nearly doubling its viewership average to 211,000 viewers (on-par with what K&C normally gets). The 5pm ET timeslot, while successful, bumped Kudlow & Company to 8pm. This brought the show's ratings down substantially compared to where they were before the temporary move. After its successful 5pm test run during the week of 2006-09-18, CNBC retried the program again at 8pm the week after. CNBC had hoped it may have gained some traction after the increased viewership from the week prior. The show did not. Ratings were roughly on-par with the summer 2006 airings.

== Production ==
Fast Money broadcasts live weekdays at 5p ET from Times Square New York, New York, second-floor studios of the NASDAQ by CNBC, a national cable television network owned by NBC Universal/Comcast.

As of January 2009, among the many contributors are producer Jason Farkas, and tape producers Heather Wilcox and Boaz Halaban, responsible for creating and delivering the final show to air, after creating special Avid Adrenaline edited elements by CNBC Staff Avid Editors such as Conrad deVroeg, Gary Princz, Diana Constantino, and Dave Lettieri, and constructing the show with CNBC Staff Grass Valley NewsEdit Editors Rich Uliasz, Cosimo Camporeale, Carolyn Shivey, Vanessa DiPietro, Keri Conjura, Diana Acosta, and Kelly Frisco.

== Special editions ==
=== Dow drops 416 ===
On 2007-02-27, a special edition of Fast Money, which covered that day's 416-point plunge on the Dow Jones Industrial Average, aired. It was rebroadcast at 1am ET, pre-empting that night's scheduled airing of The Big Idea with Donny Deutsch.

=== Wall Street's Worst Week since September 2002 ===
On 2007-03-02, another special edition of Fast Money aired. This time, it was a look back at Wall Street's worst week in nearly 4½ years. Erin Burnett was the guest moderator of that episode (Dylan Ratigan was on assignment in Washington, DC when it aired).

=== Fast Money: Live from Silicon Valley ===
On 2007-10-19, Fast Money was broadcast live from the Computer History Museum in Mountain View, CA. This special edition also covered that day's 367-point plunge on the Dow, which coincidentally, occurred 20 years to the day it lost 508 points, or 22.6% of its value on Black Monday.

=== Fast Money 1st Anniversary ===
The Fast Money 1st Anniversary special was broadcast on 2008-01-15. This special edition showed memorable clips from its first year on the air from the NASDAQ (where Fast Money re-debuted on 2007-01-08), and also covered that day's 277-point plunge on the Dow. Michael Eisner, former Disney CEO and current host of his own CNBC show, Conversations with Michael Eisner, made a special guest appearance on this program.

=== Fast Money: Miami Advice ===
On 2008-02-29, Fast Money was broadcast live from Coral Gables, Florida, a suburb of Miami. This special edition also covered that day's 315-point plunge on the Dow. Jack Welch, former chairman and CEO of General Electric (the parent company of CNBC) and retiring NBA star Alonzo Mourning made special guest appearances on this program, which was also the first Fast Money to be filmed outdoors.

=== Fast Money: Trading Chicago Hope ===
The third Fast Money road show was broadcast live from the Cadillac Palace Theatre in Chicago on 2008-05-16. Making special guest appearances in this edition were CME Chairman Terry Duffy, personal finance guru Suze Orman (host of CNBC's The Suze Orman Show) and Playboy Enterprises CEO Christie Hefner.

=== Fast Money Now ===
These special half-hour editions of Fast Money were aired at 1pm ET during the 2008 Summer Olympics over two weeks, from 2008-08-11 to 2008-08-22. Due to CNBC's Olympics coverage, Fast Money Now (1pm ET) and Mad Money at the Half (1:30pm ET) were shown in place of the second hour of Power Lunch, while the hour-long editions of Fast Money (seen on a same-day tape delay) aired at 9pm ET.

=== Fast Money: Future of Wall Street ===
This special edition of Fast Money, which was broadcast from New York 2008-09-19 in front of a live audience, featured a guest appearance from activist investor Carl Icahn. This show was filmed in the Jazz at Lincoln Center—Allen Room. This show also covered that day's 369-point gain on the Dow.

=== Fast Money: Washington – The Way Forward ===
This edition of the Fast Money road show was broadcast live from the DAR Constitution Hall in Washington, D.C., on 2008-11-07. Guests included Keith Hennessey, assistant to the president for economic policy and Richard Brown, Federal Deposit Insurance Corporation chief economist. The panel included five members with Tim Seymour joining the regular crew.

=== Fast Money Tenth Anniversary ===
For the week of 2017-01-09, the tenth-anniversary editions of Fast Money were broadcast live from the NASDAQ MarketSite in New York.

== Fast Money MBA Challenge ==
Students from the top business schools across America competed in the Fast Money MBA Challenge, which was also hosted by Dylan Ratigan. The shows were recorded at CNBC Global Headquarters in Englewood Cliffs, New Jersey, on 2007-07-14 and 2007-07-15. Fast Money MBA Challenge aired on 2007-08-01, 2007-08-08, 2007-08-15, and 2007-08-22, and were repeated on the following Sunday at 9PM and 12AM Eastern Time from 2007-08-05 through 2007-08-26.

Participating schools:

- UCLA Anderson School of Management
- Columbia Business School
- MIT Sloan School of Management
- Yale School of Management
- New York University Stern School of Business
- Tuck School of Business, Dartmouth College
- McCombs School of Business, University of Texas at Austin
- The University of Chicago Booth School of Business

The championship final of the Fast Money MBA Challenge was broadcast live from outside the NASDAQ Marketsite in New York City on 2007-08-22. In that championship final, Yale faced Texas for the $200,000 prize. After six weeks, the $200,000 prize was won by Yale.

== Worldwide simulcast ==
=== CNBC Asia ===
CNBC Asia broadcasts the programme on Tuesdays to Saturdays 5AM SIN/HK/TWN Time LIVE during the Daylight Saving Time period in the U.S. Without DST, CNBC Asia only broadcasts "LIVE" Friday (US time) edition of Fast Money on Saturdays morning at 6am SIN/HK/TWN time, and rerun version of Mondays to Thursdays US time editions are aired from Tuesdays to Fridays at 12pm SIN/HK/TWN time.

=== CNBC Europe ===
Until April 2025 CNBC Europe did not generally broadcast the programme live as the channel had opted to show weekly magazine programmes in that slot, although it was seen live when the news of the day merited extra live news programming. However it was shown on some years between November and March on a four-hour tape delay to fill the one-hour gap between the end of Street Signs and the start of Capital Connection, created by Europe not being on Daylight Saving Time.
