= The Cover =

- Managing Editor: Bill Thornhill
- Categories: Covered Bond Market
- Frequency: Daily
- Publisher: Euromoney Institutional Investor
- Country: UK
- Language: English
- Website: www.coveredbondnews.com

The Cover is a news source that covers the covered bond market and provides subscribers with a dedicated daily online news service and breaking news on covered bond issues as they are launched. The purpose of The Cover is to provide participants in the covered bond market with a club publication of their own.

The Cover is an interactive product which allows readers to comment on articles and issues as they happen. This allows it to provide a true reflection of what the covered bond market is currently thinking. The Cover also delivers essential information on the secondary markets, covered bond regulation, and the people that matter. It has a website that is continuously updated with breaking stories, and readers receive regular email or mobile updates on the latest covered bond market news.

In association with Dealogic, The Cover publishes unique league tables with rankings for the covered bond market. Dealogic bank rankings have become a barometer for the industry and a benchmark for banking performance. Dealogic has a long partnership with the EuroWeek group. Each week, The Cover publishes the latest global benchmark ranking for the covered bond market, as well as a unique league table that excludes self-led deals and information on bookrunners in all currencies.

The Cover is published by the EuroWeek group, part of Euromoney Institutional Investor PLC. Euromoney Institutional Investor is a business and financial publisher of Euromoney magazine and Metal Bulletin.
