= The Track Record =

American pop punk band

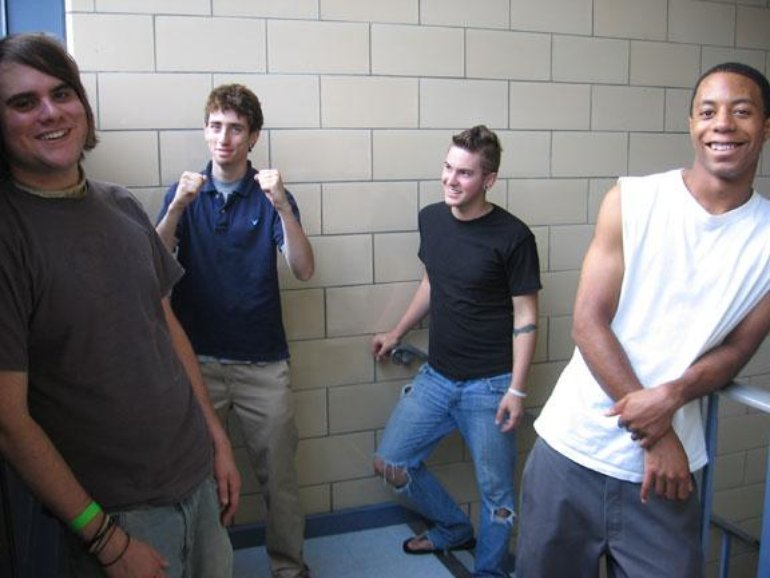
The Track Record in 2004. From left: Rob Viti, Rob Elson, Michael Strackbein, Hasani Martin

The Track Record was an American pop punk band from Annapolis, Maryland, United States, that was signed to Rushmore Records. The band consisted of Michael Strackbein (vocals, bass guitar), Rob Elson (guitar), Rob Viti (guitar), and Hasani Martin (drums). Rob Elson was the primary songwriter. Rob Elson and Hasani both attended the University of Maryland, College Park, until they decided to pursue the band full-time.

The band formed in 2003 and soon after recorded what they called "the 2003 EP". The EP had six songs, including "Letters to Summer". "Letters to Summer" was also on their second EP recorded in 2004. This EP was re-released in 2005 after they were signed by Rushmore Records. They were the first band asked to be signed by Rushmore, but due to legal complications they were the fourth band signed after Self Against City, Day at the Fair, and Houston Calls. Their first national tour was in the summer of 2005 with Rookie of the Year. They also played select dates of the 2005 Vans Warped Tour.

In September 2006, The Track Record left Rushmore records and entered the studio to record their debut full length titled "The Coolest Kind of Crazy" which would be released by the band, independent of any record label. The title of the album is also the last line of the record. Soon after completion of the album, they left for their second national tour with Southcott and Upper Class Trash. The album was available on their website for pre-sale on Thanksgiving weekend 2006 while the band was in Yorba Linda, California. The band has also played with other bands such as Hidden in Plain View and Hellogoodbye.

The Track Record announced on their MySpace page on May 2, 2007, that they "decided to stop playing music as The Track Record….we are breaking up or going on "indefinite hiatus," if you will." Their final performance as a band was at Recher Theatre on August 19, 2007, with the Dangerous Summer, Gatsby Gets the Green Light, the Spotlight, and You, Me, and Everyone We Know.

Guitarist Rob Viti died in February 2011 at the age of 26.

In 2016, Strackbein formed the band Mean Sea with Jeremy Hayes and Shane Walsh.

== Discography ==
=== Albums ===
- "The Coolest Kind of Crazy" (2006)

=== EPs ===
- "The 2003 EP" (2003)
- "The Track Record EP" (2005) released on Rushmore Records

=== Non album tracks ===
- "Have Yourself a Merry Little Christmas" on Happy Holidays from Drive-Thru Records, December, 2004
