= Joshua Brown (writer) =

American author

- Born: Joshua Morgan Brown; 1977 (age 48–49)
- Education: University of Maryland
- Known for: Commentator on CNBC

Joshua Morgan Brown (born February 25, 1977) is an American author, columnist, blogger, commentator on CNBC, and CEO of New York City-based Ritholtz Wealth Management, an independent investment advisory firm he founded with Barry Ritholtz. He is also a contributing columnist to Yahoo! Finance, Business Insider and Upside. "Downtown" Josh Brown was ranked the No. 1 financial Twitter follow by The Wall Street Journal in 2013. Brown also co-hosts a weekly podcast with Michael Batnick entitled The Compound & Friends.

== Writing ==
Brown is the author of Backstage Wallstreet, published in 2012. His second book was released in 2014, Clash of the Financial Pundits co-authored with CNBC and Yahoo! Finance commentator Jeff Macke. He is also the author of The Reformed Broker, a widely read blog about "markets, politics, economics, media, culture and finance". The Reformed Broker blog celebrated its fifth anniversary on November 10, 2013. The blog continued until November 29, 2023, when Brown explained that he was ending The Reformed Broker due to him no longer being the person he was when he started it.

== Education ==
Brown graduated with a bachelor's degree from University of Maryland in 1999 and has stated that he holds no formal training in economics.

== Personal life ==
Brown is a resident of Long Island, New York.
