= GlobalCapital =

- Chairman, Delinian: Henry Elkington
- CEO, Delinian: Andrew Pinder
- CEO, NextGen Publishing: Isaac Showman
- Managing Director, GlobalCapital: Toby Fildes
- London Bureau Chief, GlobalCapital: Ralph Sinclair
- New York Bureau Chief, GlobalCapital: Oliver West
- Categories: Capital markets
- Frequency: Daily online newspaper
- Publisher: GlobalCapital, Delinian Ltd.
- First issue: 1987
- Country: United Kingdom
- Language: English
- Website: www.globalcapital.com

GlobalCapital is a news and data service covering the global capital markets, in particular the debt and securitisation markets. It is one of the brands within Derivia Intelligence, which was sold from Delinian (formerly Euromoney PLC) in 2026 to the private equity company Triple.

The publication is targeted at bankers, issuers, lawyers, investors, regulators, trading platforms and other industry experts.

== History ==
GlobalCapital, previously known as Euroweek, started in 1987 by the financial publishing company Euromoney as a weekly printed newspaper covering capital markets.

== Change of owner ==
Euromoney Institutional Investor, which also published other titles such as Euromoney Magazine and Metal Bulletin, which later formed part of its Fastmarkets division, accepted a £1.7bn takeover bid in July 2022 from private equity groups Astorg and Epiris.

The deal split the business in two. Fastmarkets became a stand-alone entity, owned, and controlled by Astorg, with the remaining Euromoney business, including GlobalCapital, operating under the majority ownership and control of Epiris.

In November 2022, Becketts Bidco Limited, a newly formed company indirectly owned by funds managed by Astorg and Epiris, completed its acquisition of Euromoney, and it was delisted from the London Stock Exchange.
