= IFLR =

IFLR may refer to:

- Institute for Food Laws and Regulations
- International Financial Law Review
