= Institutional Investor =

Institutional Investor may refer to:

- Institutional investor
- Institutional Investor (magazine)
