= Industrial mineral =

Geological materials mined for commercial value in industry

Industrial resources (minerals) are geological materials that are mined for their commercial value, which are not fuel (fuel minerals or mineral fuels) and are not sources of metals (metallic minerals) but are used in the industries based on their physical and/or chemical properties. They are used in their natural state or after beneficiation either as raw materials or as additives in a wide range of applications.

== Examples and applications ==
Typical examples of industrial rocks and minerals are limestone, clays, sand, gravel, diatomite, kaolin, bentonite, silica, barite, gypsum and talc. Some examples of applications for industrial minerals are construction, ceramics, paints, electronics, filtration, plastics, glass, detergents and paper.

In some cases, even organic materials (peat) and industrial products or by-products (cement, slag, silica fume) are categorized under industrial minerals, as well as metallic compounds mainly utilized in non-metallic form (as an example most titanium is utilized as an oxide TiO_{2} rather than Ti metal).

The evaluation of raw materials to determine their suitability for use as industrial minerals requires technical test-work, mineral processing trials and end-product evaluation; free to download evaluation manuals are available for the following industrial minerals: limestone, flake graphite, diatomite, kaolin, bentonite and construction materials. These are available from the British Geological Survey external link 'Industrial Minerals in BGS' with regular industry news and reports published in Industrial Minerals magazine.

== List of industrial minerals by name ==
- Aggregates
- Alunite
- Asbestos
- Asphalt, Natural
- Ball clays
- Baryte
- Bentonite / Diatomite / Fuller's earth
- Borates
- Brines
- Carbonatites
- Corundum
- Diamond
- Dimension stone
- Feldspar and Nepheline - Syenite
- Fluorspar
- Garnet
- Gem mineral
- Granite
- Graphite
- Gypsum
- Halite
- Kaolin
- Kyanite / Sillimanite / Andalusite
- Limestone / Dolomite
- Marble
- Mica
- Mirabilite
- Natron
- Nahcolite
- Novaculite
- Olivine
- Perlite
- Phosphate
- Potash –Potassium minerals
- Pumice
- Quartz
- Slate
- Silica sand / Tripoli
- Sulfur
- Talc
- Vermiculite
- Wollastonite
- Zeolites

== See also ==
- List of minerals
- List of minerals recognized by the International Mineralogical Association
- Industrial Minerals, magazine
- Mineral industry
- Minerals
