= Ned Davis (analyst) =

American finance analyst and author

Nathan E. Davis
- Born: 1945 or 1946 (age 80–81); Nashville, U.S.
- Education: University of North Carolina at Chapel Hill
- Occupation: Financial analyst
- Known for: Technical analysis of long-term data series
- Title: Co-founder and CEO of Ned Davis Research

Nathan E. "Ned" Davis (born 1945/1946, Nashville), is an American financial analyst, finance author, and co-founder of the Ned Davis Research Group (NDRG), a data-driven investment research company based in Venice, Florida.

== Early life and education ==
Davis was born in Nashville, went to school at the University School of Nashville graduating in 1963, and did his undergraduate degree at the University of North Carolina at Chapel Hill, majoring in French.

== Career ==
He dropped out of Harvard Business School as he found he was more interested in finance and investment than management, and returned to Nashville to spend 12 years working at the regional investment bank, J.C. Bradford & Co. At J.C. Bradford, Davis met Ed Mendel, and the two became interested in the idea of using computers to analyze investment data, however, their request in 1979 to the company for US$30,000 to buy a mainframe computer was declined. At the time, Davis was a partner in the firm, and his investment views were covered nationally in publications such as The Washington Post.

== Ned Davis Research (1980–) ==
In 1980, Davis and Mendel co-founded the Ned Davis Research Group (NDRG) in Venice, Florida starting with 5 employees, to focus on computer data analysis driven investment research and advice for trading firms. Davis focused on the analysis, and Mendel focused on the business model and business management. In 2011, NDRG was sold to the global financial publishing company Euromoney for circa 173 million; Davis remained with the company after the transaction. As well as its Venice headquarters, NDRG had branches in Atlanta, Boston, San Francisco, and London, with over 1,000 global institutional investment clients, including Fidelity Investments and the Charles Schwab Corporation.

Davis (and NDRG), is a frequent contributor to the Wall Street Journal, Financial Times, Bloomberg News, CNBC, Barron's, and other financial publications. Their quantitative and technical research on various long-term data series in markets is used as reference in publications such as The Encyclopedia Of Technical Market Indicators, as well as in their own publications.

In April 2013, finance author Barry Ritholtz said, "Ned Davis may be the single most highly respected Technical Analyst working today", and interviewed Davis for the Bloomberg: Masters in Business (MiB) series, where Davis said: "We are in the business of making mistakes. The only difference between the winners and the losers is that the winners make small mistakes, while the losers make big mistakes".

Davis has been described as a follower of contrarian investing, who warns against situations of very strong consensus or herd mentality.

== Published works ==
Davis has published a number of books on finance, which have been re-published in subsequent editions:

- Davis, Nathan E. (April 2003). Beware of the Crowd at Extremes: The Importance of Contrary Opinion in the Stock Market. Ned Davis Research. ISBN 978-0970265135.
- Davis, Ned (November 2003). The Triumph of Contrarian Investing: Crowds, Manias, and Beating the Market by Going Against the Grain (1st ed.). McGraw Hill. ISBN 978-0071432405.
- Davis, Ned (April 2005). Markets in Motion (3rd ed.). Wiley. ISBN 978-0471732815.
- Davis, Ned (December 2014). Being Right or Making Money (3rd ed.). Wiley. ISBN 978-1118992067.

== See also ==
- Technical analysis
- Fed model
