= Richard Thomas Alexander =

American educator (1887–1971)

- Born: July 3, 1887; Smicksburg, Pennsylvania, U.S.
- Died: October 16, 1971 (aged 84); Waynesville, North Carolina, U.S.

Philosophical work
- Era: 20th-century philosophy
- Region: Western Philosophy
- School: Pragmatism
- Main interests: Comparative education, philosophy of education, epistemology, social reconstruction, ethics, German progressivism, critical pedagogy
- Notable ideas: Educational progressivism, concept of community

Richard Thomas Alexander (1887–1971) was an American educator and education theorist. An early proponent of the progressive education movement of John Dewey, Alexander was the driving force behind the creation of the New College, Teachers College, Columbia University, New York City. He was its chairman from 1932 to 1938. Alexander was described by his contemporaries as a hard-working, pragmatic man and a common sense academic with a genius for organization and a love of education.

== Early life (1887–1913) ==
Richard Alexander was born on July 3, 1887, in Smicksburg, Pennsylvania, to Mary Elizabeth Wilhelm Alexander and William John Alexander, one of four children. He had two older brothers, John Wilhelm Alexander and Wallace P. Alexander, and a younger sister, Ethel M. Alexander. A move to Kirksville, Missouri was precipitated by a tenuous family situation that led to the separation of young Thomas's parents when he was very young. William John Alexander, who was at one time President of Beaver College (now Arcadia University) in Beaver, Pennsylvania, ended up in San Francisco, California, where he died in 1926. The relationship Richard Alexander had with his father is not known, as there was little contact between them. By the age of 14, he was enrolled in the Kirksville Public School system graduating from Kirksville Public High School at the age of 16 in 1903. He attended the First District Normal School (later, Truman State University) in Kirksville, graduating with a Bachelor of Pedagogy (Pd.B.) in 1905 and later receiving a Master of Pedagogy (M.Pd) in 1907. While working on his master's degree, he taught in Kirksville, rising to the role of principal by 1906. Alexander applied to the University of Missouri but he was not given credit for the work he had done at the normal school. Alexander started Columbia University studying German on September 25, 1907, on a trial basis.

Coming from a rural setting, Alexander did not let himself be bored in the big city. He obtained employment during the week downtown as an usher in the theater district, including the Metropolitan Opera House. It was very good pay, however most of the performances were at night which ordinarily might interfere with studies. Alexander sensibly saw an advantage to the situation. Reminiscing years later to his son, Alexander said there wasn't much work to do as an usher. He went down to the theater every night at a certain time, showed people to their seats, and after the first act started, he was basically finished. After seeing the show a few times he then took a book to study and read. Later in his life he would tell students that if you must get a job, try to get one where you would have the opportunity to learn something. Alexander knew that every experience could be a learning moment. In finding employment, even part-time, one should seek a position where the brain is challenged rather than numbed in robotic drudgery. Alexander always advocated pedagogy of “lifelong learning” and lived it as an example of a positive life choice.

After receiving the undergraduate credit he sought, Alexander applied and received a year's leave of absence to spend the 1908–1909 school year teaching overseas and studying German at the University of Jena with Professor Wilhelm Rein. He had obtained employment teaching science at Robert College, a boys' school in Constantinople, Turkey, until the Adana Massacre prompted him to Germany.

Returning to New York, Alexander completed all the academic requirements to graduate in 1909, but had to wait until, 1910, to receive his A.B. diploma because of a certain physical education requirement. Alexander needed to demonstrate his ability to swim the length of a pool and receive a certificate of completion. It was not that he did not know how to swim; he just thought the requirement was silly and so he put it off until it was too late to register for the 1909 commencement. This event caused Alexander to think that there was something seriously wrong with an education curriculum that was so structured. The philosopher Dr. Mortimer J. Adler suffered a similar fate as he failed to pass the required swimming test for a bachelor's degree at Columbia College. Like Alexander, he considered it a nuisance. Adler never received his A.B. degree, but so impressed the faculty he was allowed into graduate school to complete his doctorate in psychiatry. Dr. Adler later received his A. B. degree in 1983.

Alexander accepted a position teaching science at Heathcote School(also known as Heathcote Hall) in Harrison, Westchester County, New York, about twenty-five miles north from Manhattan. This was a private boarding school for young boys. During the summer break Alexander returned to Europe to continue his graduate studies. At Columbia University he skipped the desire to complete a master's program and registered as a doctoral student with Dr. Paul Monroe during which time he was also a graduate assistant to Dr. Edward L. Thorndike.

== Nashville and Peabody (1914–1924) ==
1n 1914, Alexander received an appointment to the George Peabody College for Teachers, in Nashville, TN. It let him solidify some of his thoughts about teacher education, the concept of community, and curriculum theory. It would show him that the logistics of starting a school within a school is very feasible. It would also introduce him to a couple of people who would forever change his life, Grace Elizabeth Andrews, his future wife, and William Fletcher Russell, son of Teachers College Dean James Earl Russell.

The next year, 1915, was significant for Alexander in that he would receive academic acclaim as the founder of the Peabody Demonstration School and a contributor to the establishment of the Knapp Farm. The school lasted as a part of the Peabody College campus until 1974, when the college decided to close it. Afterwards, a sympathetic group of parents, alumni, students and teachers re-formed the demonstration school as the University School of Nashville, a non-profit, independent institution.

Alexander completed his dissertation and received his doctorate in 1916, submitting his dissertation entitled The Prussian Elementary Schools. The work, a detailed description of Prussian educational practices before the war, was published in book form in 1919. This is significant because, Alexander's next major work, (co-written with Beryl Parker) entitled The New Education in the German Republic, offered a detailed description of German education after the war, in contrast to his first book.

Alexander and Russell spent three years in Nashville together at one time briefly sharing an apartment until Russell left in 1917 to become Dean of the College of Education at the State University of Iowa. In 1923 Russell became a professor of education and associate director of the International Institute at Teachers College until he succeeded his father as Dean of Teachers College in 1927. It was Russell that brought Alexander to the faculty at Columbia as part of the International Institute and later, it was Russell who approved the creation of New College.

== International Institute of Teachers College (1924–1930) ==
In 1923, Russell left Iowa to accept the position of associate director of the International Institute of Teachers College, with Paul Monroe as Director. In 1924, Dr. Thomas Alexander was asked to become part of the staff joining Isaac Leon Kandel, Lester L. Wilson, Stephen P. Duggan, Milton C. Del Manzo, George Counts, and Ruth McMurry. Alexander was the German expert at the institute and as such he returned to Europe many times and cultivated friendships with Dr. Fritz Karsen, Dr. Franz Hilker, Dr. Peter Petersen, Paul Geheeb, and Adolphe Ferrière.

== New College (1930–1939) ==
All of Alexander's experiences thus far convinced him that a new type of teachers college was necessary to address the social issues of the day. Originally, New College's progressive foundations, its philosophical origins, and its influences were the Concept of Community, Critical Pedagogy, and German Progressive Education. After the planning for the new college began, the United States suffered the economic upheaval that was the Great Depression. Resulting influences then included Social Reconstruction and Student Activism.

There was a planned departure from traditional teacher-training institutions by placing special emphasis on child nature and development through experiences designed to give the student an insight into the problems of contemporary social life. Alexander sought to develop a critical consciousness in his students for intellectually based social leadership and provide guidance in effectually meeting the universally persistent problems of living, that is, the essential problems of living that students and in reality, all humans, would face in all stages of their development as individuals, as members of social groups, and as teachers of children and adults. Using innovative ideas such as extended foreign study, community-based active research, and authentic assessment, a portfolio-based undergraduate learning curriculum was developed which rejected traditional summative grades or the accumulation of credits as the basis of degree completion.

The logistical and managerial challenges of establishing an institution of higher learning from the ground up were significant. Alexander was involved in many aspects of the institution’s development, including finding classrooms and dormitories, developing the curriculum, and selecting the initial faculty and first group of students..

The worsening socio-economic atmosphere fueled the rise of communism and socialism in America's cities. In the world, New College students saw the rise of Hitler in Germany, Japanese aggression in Manchuria, the Italian invasion of Ethiopia, and the tragedy of the Spanish Civil War. As a result, many New College students became politically active, encouraged by the philosophy of community-based active research. Some students, avowed communists and socialists, were given “credit” and in one case, a scholarship, for organizing and participating in demonstrations, protests and pickets.

By 1938, Dean William F. Russell had to decide that the experimental institution was a financial failure. Indeed, the figures in the budget were very clear. New College was in a continual state of deficit spending, but then again, so was every other college or university in the United States, Teachers College included. A college or university that ran in the black during the Depression was a rarity. Although notoriously apolitical, Alexander found himself governing the college through a highly politicized decade steeped in extreme idealism calling for social action. Alexander didn't consider himself a “progressive” or an iconic figure of reform like Kilpatrick or Counts, but rather he was an educator who knew that the teacher, a competent and cultured one, makes the difference in any community or society. Because he never liked to play the political game the extreme left would accuse him of anti-Semitism and being a secret Nazi sympathizer, while the extreme right would hold up his college, the reflection of his educational philosophy, as an example of communist infiltration in higher education. New College closed in 1939.

== World War II (1939–1946) ==
The closing of New College hit Alexander hard. Although, still technically a member of the Teachers College faculty, he spent the war years teaching sporadically and helping other New College faculty in their endeavors to keep the college's unique philosophy alive. Had New College not existed, Alexander may very well have been regarded as an early pioneer of comparative education, along with Kandel, especially through his close friendship with Drs. Franz Hilker and Friedrich Schneider, who both were highly regarded in the burgeoning field of comparative education. The innovation of foreign study as a requirement lived on in Dr. Agnes Snyder, who soon left after the closing of New College, eventually becoming the chairman of the Department of Education at Adelphi College. In this position she called on Alexander to renew his vision of New College through Adelphi's New Teachers Education Program (ANTEP), which required foreign study as part of the program.

Later, in a letter to alumni of New College, Thomas Alexander wrote that in 1945 "at a dinner in my home one night, William Russell said, 'Tom, the biggest mistake in my life was to close New College'. Dr. Alexander answered, 'It's a hell of a time to find that out'.”

Richard Thomas Alexander purchased the land where the New College Community was near Canton, North Carolina, where he lived until his death on October 16, 1971.

== Postwar Germany ==
When one of his New College students and protege, John W. Taylor, was appointed to lead the E&RA (Education & Religious Affairs) branch of OMGUS, the Office of Military Government, United States in the American Zone of post-war Germany, Alexander was in 1946 recruited to advise on rebuilding the German education system, drawing up recommendations which made Dewey's educational ideals central to the project. Alexander and Taylor worked for the relatively minuscule E&RA branch whose first mandate was simply to get the children off the streets. The attempts were not successful partly due to Alexander's non-political nature. Echoing his intransigence to non-educational aims, Alexander and Taylor did not try to reach out to political allies who might help them but rather chose their counterparts in Germany, secondary education scholars. The unwillingness of the Catholic Church, the Protestant Church and other Christian entities to accept a one-track school system because of concerns about lowered standards soon discredited the American attempt to reform German education, which was effectively abandoned in 1948. For his efforts, nonetheless, Alexander was awarded a medal by the German Government.

== Publications ==
- Alexander, R. T. (1919) The Prussian Elementary Schools. New York, NY: Macmillan.
- Alexander, R. T. (1927) Practice Teaching in Germany for Elementary and Secondary teachers. Educational Administration and Supervision, 13, 289–291.
- Alexander, R. T. & Kandel, I. L. (1927) The Reorganization of Education in Prussia. New York, NY: Teachers College, Columbia University.
- Alexander, R. T. & Parker, B. (1929) The New Education in the German Republic. New York, NY: John Day Co.
- Alexander, R. T. (1929) The Training of Elementary Teachers in Germany. New York, NY: Teachers College, Columbia University.
- Alexander, R. T. (1930) A Wider Extension of the Content of Student Teaching. Educational Administration and Supervision, 16, 352-358
- Alexander, R. T. (1930) Need for the establishment of an experimental teachers college. New York, NY: Teachers College, Columbia University.
- Alexander, R. T. (1931) Plan for a Demonstration Teachers College. Virginia Teacher, 12, 192–195.
- Alexander, R. T. (1931) New teachers college. School and Society, 34, 528.
- Alexander, R. T. (1933) Significance of New College. National Education Association, Proceedings of the Seventy-first Annual Meeting, Chicago, 730–735.
- Alexander, R. T. (1935) Basic aims, scope, and organization of the curriculum of New College for the education of teachers. Proceedings of the Institute for Higher Institutions, 75–95.
- Alexander, R. T., Snyder, A., Morris, M., & Limbert, P. (1935) New College and its community building program. Unpublished manuscript, New College, Columbia University.
- Alexander, R. T. (1936) New College program for the education of teachers of social science. Educational Administration and Supervision, 22, 447–470.
- Alexander, R. T., Snyder, A., & Stratemeyer, F. (1937) "The curriculum at New College." In B. Lamar Johnson (Ed.), What about survey courses. New York, NY: Holt and Company.
