= The Deal (magazine) =

- The Deal, June 16 - July 6, 2008
- Editor-in-chief: Robert Teitelman
- Categories: Business magazines
- Frequency: Bimonthly
- Circulation: 40,000
- First issue: September 1999
- Final issue: September 2012 (print)
- Company: Euromoney Institutional Investor
- Country: United States
- Language: English
- Website: www.thedeal.com
- ISSN: 1541-9878

The Deal LLC is a media company that offers The Deal Pipeline, a transaction information service, and formerly published finance and business magazine The Deal. The company generates original and daily articles, commentary and data that cover the world of finance and business through the lens of deal making, focusing on core areas including Mergers & Acquisitions, private equity, venture capital financings, bankruptcies and other topics of interest to the investment banking, private equity, legal, hedge fund and venture capital industries.

The roots of the media company began when The Daily Deal was launched in September 1999 by American Lawyer Media with strong support from dealmaker Bruce Wasserstein. In March 2000, ALM sold the assets of the Deal to U.S. Equity Partners, a private equity fund sponsored by Wasserstein & Co. In December 2000, Rustic Canyon Ventures, a venture capital firm based in Southern California, led a $30 million venture round of financing. In 2012, The Deal was acquired by TheStreet.com, who closed the magazine. After being acquired by The Street, all publications of The Deal became digital and are still available today.

In 2018, TheStreet announced the sale of BoardEx and The Deal to Euromoney Institutional Investor.
