= New College, Teachers College, Columbia University =

Former undergraduate college at Columbia University

New College for the Education of Teachers, Teachers College, Columbia University
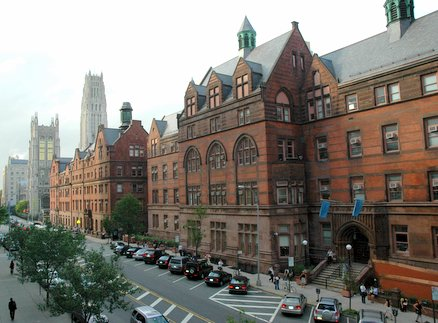
- Teachers College, view down West 120th Street
- Type: Private
- Established: 1932
- President: Richard Thomas Alexander, 1932-1938; Donald Tewksbury, 1938-1939
- Faculty: 124 (1932-1939)
- Students: 739 (1932-1939)
- Location: New York City, New York, USA; 40.810293°N 73.960386°W
- Campus: Urban
- Website: www.tc.columbia.edu

New College for the Education of Teachers (or simply New College) was a progressive undergraduate college under the auspices of Teachers College, Columbia University that existed from 1932 to 1939. It does not represent the current institution that is Teachers College Columbia University.

The college was located in New York City. It used the same facilities as Teachers College at the Morningside Heights campus. The college also had learning communities established in North Carolina, Georgia, and abroad in foreign study groups. Using innovative ideas such as extended foreign study, community-based active research, and authentic assessment, a portfolio-based undergraduate learning curriculum was developed which rejected traditional summative grades or the accumulation of credits as the basis of degree completion. This was truly a "learn by doing" experience. The college was closed due to a combination of growing financial deficits and student activism in 1939.

== History ==
New College was established in 1932 under the leadership of Richard Thomas Alexander (1887-1971). New College, as it became known, was originally designed to operate as an undergraduate college level unit granting a Bachelor of Science and/or a master's degree after a period of study from three to five years. It was to serve the dual purpose of preparing young people for teaching positions in elementary and secondary grades and of affording a demonstration college for graduate students in Teachers College. Students would ultimately become professors in colleges and universities with teacher training programs.

The nationally acclaimed New College would close within seven years under the pretext of financial hardship over the protestations of some of the country's leading academic, political, and social figures of the era. In reality, the school was closed because the students followed the ideals of the New College program which promoted participation in the creation of a “new social order” at the grassroots classroom level using the Concept of Community as a framework. Students were taught to solve the problems they encounter in society seeking solutions for the betterment of their students and community. Sometimes the solutions would put them at odds with powers that be, which preferred the status quo. The educational philosophies of New College, developed by Alexander, encouraged students to think critically, solve problems, and later, question the ruling hegemony and the status quo of the dominant social structure. The examination and analysis of the "Persistent Problems of Living", the "Concept of Community", and the creation of a "New Social Order" served as the philosophical springboard for action, steered by those social and economic conditions of the times.

== Relationship with Teachers College ==
New College was an autonomous unit within Teachers College with its own advisory board, budget and faculty. If it was so advised, New College students could take classes at Teachers College if it fulfilled the objectives in their personal Long-Term View. New College students were young undergraduates, mostly teenagers, who were often at odds with the Teachers College students because of politics and youthful exuberance. Likewise, the Teachers College faculty was less than cooperative with New College with the exception of notable professors William Chandler Bagley, John Dewey, William Heard Kilpatrick, and George S. Counts. In the minds of some faculty members, if New College was the best way to educate teachers, according to Alexander, what did that say about the traditional curriculum?

== Curriculum ==
Alexander knew that the curriculum pattern for New College would have to go beyond anything philosophically practiced before. It's not that there were no other experimental institutions in the nation; indeed, other educators with vision were taking advantage of the experimental nature of curriculum design offered by the social conditions of the time. Alexander Meiklejohn at the University of Wisconsin, Bard College and Bennington College, were also introducing innovative curricular elements of a sound liberal arts education. In 1930, Alexander saw the need was to train educational leaders and not just classroom teachers. He laid out his curricular philosophy at the opening meeting of the convention of the New York State Association of Teachers College and Normal School Faculties, declaring that more emphasis should be given to the objectives of life and less upon the stereotyped processes of teaching, such as those embracing psychologically scientific methods. He told the audience, "In the last twenty years we have measured everything in the school system. We have scales for this and that, but we have ignored the real objectives of human society. Teachers give more heed to measuring what they teach than to educating the children." To his thinking, the inadequacy of training in the values of life was the greatest weakness in American teacher education. Alexander added, "Young teachers in training should be required to participate actively in some walks of life, and it would be extremely educative for them to pass a semester in a factory, on a farm, or in some industry. Their [the students'] ability to appreciate and understand the problems of life would be immeasurably increased." Those problems would be the basis of an innovative curriculum at New College. Alexander called them the "Persistent Problems of Living". He already had a global perspective from his travels all through Europe before and after the war and he traveled extensively in the United States lecturing and visiting schools. Alexander had the revelation that regardless of culture, social standing, religion and nationality that every person, every human on earth faced the same problems, in varying degrees in his journey down life's path. Colloquially speaking, everyone puts their pants on one leg at a time.

These problems were developed in relationship to and revolving around four aspects of human existence: human relationships, natural sciences, the arts and aesthetics, and philosophy. The curriculum based on those persistent problems starts with Central Seminars in which the problems in these areas were generally analyzed and dissected. If the conversations found themselves heading off in two directions, Divisional Seminars were formed. The students met weekly as per schedule, or in private, and critically examined the coursework, the knowledge, and the skills necessary for the solution of the problem. The student also met frequently with their faculty adviser. Every hour in every day was considered to be part of the college learning experience. In order to expand the breadth and depth of the knowledge that comes with experience, as part of the New College program, Alexander created three required elements. The Period of Foreign Study, The Period of Industry, and the New College Community. Alexander felt that extensive travel and study overseas would broaden one's global viewpoint and increase appreciation for home. To appreciate the hard work of parents in a learning community, Alexander placed students in factories and stores to do the same work for a semester. The real jewel of the experiential learning process was the New College Community in North Carolina, where cooperative learning and critical thinking were developed out of necessity for survival.

== Persistent problems of living ==
The persistent problems of living that form the basis of such commonality through relevancy with both student and teacher have been around for most of human history, are trans-generational, and affect everyone on the planet. They were articulated and defined as the guiding force behind the core curriculum of New College by Alexander and his first faculty in 1931, then revisited in 1935 by Alexander, Florence Stratemeyer and William Scott Gray in the Twenty-third Yearbook of the National Society of College Teachers of Education as the third principle in their work entitled Principles of Curriculum Construction for the Education of Teachers. Finally, they were again developed as a theme to a much greater degree than previously done by Stratemeyer resulting in the crowning achievement of her scholarship, the 1947 text, Developing a Curriculum for Modern Living, co-authored with Hamden L. Forkner and Margaret McKim. In this influential textbook, Stratemeyer states that students develop understandings from facing recurring situations of everyday living, events she called “Persistent Life Situations.”

The original problems, as first determined by Alexander and the New College curriculum planners in 1931 were:

- Adjusting to and cooperating with other people.
- Maintaining physical and mental health.
- Achieving economic and political security.
- Adjusting to and controlling the natural environment.
- Interpreting and creating art and beauty.
- Searching for guiding principles and ultimate values.
- Acquiring and transmitting social heritage.

In order to develop an effective curriculum pattern for New College, Alexander knew that the nature of society and of the learner had to be considered as critical factors. For the curriculum to be effective learners of any age must see the relevancy of the instruction to themselves and that in some form or fashion; it will prove of some benefit or forestall some calamity. To be the most effective and to reach the widest student audience acceptance the curriculum content in any subject must be presented in terms that every person understands. The unspoken nod to another a complete stranger which confirms a mutual understanding would be an example. Once everyone has the same specific shared information and common knowledge of a problem, then a solution or understanding borne of the input of the collective might be found. To Alexander, the Persistent Problems represented a logical way to integrate the curriculum with relevancy and individual meaning. The causal effect of this curriculum, then, was looking for solutions to the common problems everyone in the world could understand, since they were so basic. They would examine them in critical terms and using the good of the community as support, discuss choices and possible outcomes.

=== Period of Foreign Study ===
"Recognizing the importance of international problems provision will be made for bringing students of the college in contact with foreign countries by means of travel and study, or by means of exchange of students between this and foreign countries. It is contemplated that during this period of preparation for teaching each student shall spend at least one or two semesters, abroad. The expense for such study will not exceed the expense for a similar period of study in New York. Even if it is not possible for every student to study abroad, those students who are able to avail themselves of this opportunity will be granted this privilege. The chief objective of foreign study will be to acquaint the student intimately with the culture of the foreign people, so that in his teaching activity he will be able to interpret to American children the spirit of the people with whom he has lived."

This was printed in the November 1931 issue of The Elementary School Journal, in the educational news and editorial comment area. I wonder if the notion of foreign study would have entered Alexander's mind if he was not a language student. With the concentration of his degree work centering on the German educational movement, his need to travel overseas was obvious. The time overseas did something to Alexander that he did not count on. By comparison it gave him a greater appreciation for America. He had experienced other cultures, met other people and learned much more than if he just read about them in a book.

One of the most innovative aspects of the New College philosophy was the requirement for students to spend a substantial amount of time overseas in a foreign country. It was considered an essential factor in the curriculum for the study of the civilizations and cultures of foreign countries. Service coursework was done at home as well as abroad, where most everything had experiential value towards graduation. It was obvious to Alexander that the importance of international problems made it advisable to project the content areas of social problems into direct contact with European groups, specifically German. He reasoned that whether or not the student was preparing for a career in elementary, secondary or specialized work, direct contact with another civilization or country would lead to the appreciation of the psychology and modes of living of others, enabling them to be a more effective cultural interpreter to their future students.

Additionally, the development of an appreciation of another country through foreign study would help the student better understand his own civilization in the mirror of thought of another people. By having the opportunity to study the work of the schools and learn European methods and techniques he would achieve a good means of understanding American education methods and techniques by comparison. The development of fluency in another language was not the primary purpose. While direct contact would benefit a further linguistic capability it would also serve to extend studies in literature appreciation, art, human relations, and social and economic problems. It was reasoned that studying French literature would take on a new meaning if studied in France.

The main work of the eight-month stay, student studies overseas would revolve around the New College curriculum pattern of a Central Seminar. While in Europe this seminar would be organized around the study of the host country. The first two months would be spent working in a university of the host country to become oriented to life in the host country and acquainted with its people and culture. The student then would be in a better position to determine the nature of the problems to pursue in the remaining months. After that period, the student would spend three months in an intensive study of one or more aspects of the country in which they were living. This field study was under the direction of New College instructors and foreign staff. The remaining three months was spent back at the host country's university where the student would develop and compile the research collected, analyze it and study further.

=== Period of Industry ===
"In order to understand modern life and conditions, each student will spend one or more semesters participating in some form of industry. This work will be under the guidance of the social science division of the College and will supplement the field courses in social welfare, industry, commerce, and the like. This phase of study may represent a period of work in a factory or cotton mill, on a farm, in an office, in a department store, or in a building trade. Its purposes are to develop an effective and functional appreciation and understanding of the economic and social order as related to the problems of living and working together".

The Period of Industry was another major experience of the New College program with the intent of giving the prospective teacher the insight of what a working member of the community went through during the course of his life. By better understanding the work ethic of the people they encountered it was reasoned that the teacher could be a more effective leader in the community. The problems of wages, unemployment, capital, and labor in an industrial society take on new meanings through active participation in some industrial pursuit. For instance, in consideration of the potentiality of industrial production for individual and social welfare (i.e. making buttons for garments), actual experience in a shop or factory gives a better understanding to the theories of supply and demand. The purpose of the Period of Industry was not to produce another industrial worker instead of a student, but rather through direct contact develop in that student an appreciation and understanding of the fabric of industrial organization, of the attitudes and psychology of the worker, and of the problems in the social and economic order.

The first operational year of New College did not have a Period of Industry because of the already record unemployment brought by the Great Depression. It was reasoned that it might be impossible to insist that students have an experience in industry under the circumstances. Other experiences included visits to cooperative stores, factories and farms. Contact with organized labor, organized capital, relief organizations, and welfare agencies were also encouraged as well as research into the problems of insurance, credits and taxation.

By the beginning of the 1934 school year, out of sheer economic necessity the period began as students obtained jobs. Nine students were holding full-time jobs at the start, most because they lacked the sufficient funds to continue their studies. Some of the advanced students obtained work in area private and public schools while others took employment wherever they could. Their only connection to the college was the weekly Industrial Seminar for the Working Group. They met each Wednesday evening and students came to report on industry as they were experiencing it firsthand. The seminars took a comprehensive look into the students work areas and its relation to current industrial conditions and their origins. In many cases, these discussions took a political tone and the general topic of social justice and labor relations overwhelmed specific concerns.

=== New College Community ===
The New College Community in North Carolina was the hidden jewel of the total student experience, because the importance placed on communal planning and living as part of the educative process for students had been an essential part of the New College curriculum plan from the beginning. Now here was a program in place where a balance between theory and practice could be achieved resulting in a state of informed action, or praxis as theorized years later by Paolo Freire. Alexander knew that teachers had to be prepared to participate actively in the communities in which they would work and assume educational leadership so the idea of a New College Camp, a microcosm of society where the Persistent Problems of Living, in the most basic sense, were presented to a group of students in a rural isolated setting who then had to work together and in turn learn from each other.

The initial purpose of the plan was to have all accepted students enroll with the understanding that they would spend three months, June to August, at the Camp so that their suitability to continue at New College could be determined. In many cases the new students were well out of their comfort zone, the majority being from the city. Activities in agriculture, ecology, history and customs of the area, and participation of the culture of the people of the area served to give the New College staff a new lens to judge the capabilities of future teachers. Though this was not possible for the first group of 1932 enrollees, the camp idea was kept to the forefront of planning.

The spring of 1933 found Alexander and Dean Russell together on a trip when they began to plan along the lines of setting up such a learning community. Their labors in planning the community were aided by two students, John Locke and William Taylor, who conceived of a bold plan while spending a March weekend at Camp Columbia. They presented Alexander with the idea to have a community also address the financial difficulties of attending New College in the height of the Great Depression. The student plan included a farm on which the “Resident Group” of students would live and work for an extended period of time in exchange for their education on a work/study basis. Students, the “Summer Group”, would spend the summer, prior to their start at New College in the Community for a period of student induction into communal living and as preparation in community development. Of course they would do so at regular tuition rates. The plan was well developed, complete in its outline, inventive and purposeful, and embraced New College principles.

Alexander wholeheartedly approved the plan and submitted the reworked version to the Trustees of Teachers College. The Trustees liked the idea in theory, but would not endorse a year-round farm project largely for the reason that school and college farms had almost always posed a financial liability, and that farms in general in the precarious economy of 1933 were a liability. Whether or not Alexander knew fully of the Trustees wishes on the matter, he pressed on with the idea of a year-round camp presence as called for in Locke and Taylor's plan.

In early April a location was selected in Haywood County, North Carolina. The place chosen, deep in the Appalachian Mountains in the western part of the state, was a farm of 1,800 acres near the town of Canton, about thirty-five miles southwest of Asheville. The area was owned by the Gwynn family, represented by T. Lenoire Gwynn of Waynesville. The farm was in the Pigeon River Valley on the edge of the Pisgah National Forest. Paved roads from Canton and Waynesville came to within 6 miles of the Community. The final stretch was a narrow gravel road along the Pigeon River. The site was determined by an old friend of Alexander's from his work with the Raleigh School District before his time at Columbia. Back then he had been working through North Carolina State Agricultural College in Raleigh with Bert W. Wells, who suggested the Canton site as biologically, geologically, and sociologically ideal for the purposes of New College.

The original New College Community had the use of three farm houses, one which was fairly modern, an older farm house, and a summer house a mile and a half up the valley from the other two. The “New House”, as it was called, had eight rooms and two baths with a large porch and a small screened back porch. One bath and three large bedrooms were upstairs, and the other bath was downstairs with two more bedrooms, a living room, dining room, and a kitchen. The older farm house referred to as the “Old House”, had three large rooms downstairs in addition to a dining room and kitchen. There was also a large porch that ran almost completely around the house. Two of the downstairs rooms were used for sleeping quarters and the third was a music and social room. Upstairs were two baths and four large bedrooms plus a very wide hall which would be used for several cots. The summer house was called “Lowe Cottage” and had six fair sized rooms, a screened in kitchen and two attic rooms. It had running water, an outhouse, and a shower house. An additional small shower house was constructed between the Old and New Houses. The property also came with a spring house with running water near the main houses, an old house which was prepared as a science laboratory, an old chicken house that students converted into an art studio, and a large barn near the main houses.

The first group of seven young men came to the community around April 20, 1933, with F. Oral Grounds. On May 23, a month later one more young man and six young women came to North Carolina to make up the Resident Group. That first group, other than Mr. Grounds, knew almost nothing of rural life other than the camping trips to Camp Columbia, but it was up to them to make the community habitable for the groups that were to follow.

These teenagers worked from sunrise to sunset, digging ditches and laying new water pipes, cutting cords and cords of wood for their needs, preparing the soil and planting several acres of land with hand tools. They also had to milk three cows, feed the hogs, and care for 24 laying hens and 400 baby chicks.

== Notable faculty ==
- (Richard) Thomas Alexander (1887-1971), NC Chairman, education theorist, comparative education pioneer, founder of New College
- Winifred E. Bain (1889-1965), NC Education, taught kindergarten in Minnesota and Wisconsin for eleven years before graduating from the University of Chicago in 1924. A Rockefeller Foundation fellowship made it possible for her to study at Columbia University, where she received her Master's and Ph.D. degrees, and where she remained as an assistant professor, teaching at the experimental New College from 1932 until its closure in 1940. In 1935, her book Parents Look at Modern Education was awarded a best book of the year medal by Parents Magazine. The newly created board of trustees at Wheelock School chose Bain to succeed Lucy Wheelock as principal in 1940. Under Bain's leadership, Wheelock School became Wheelock College in 1941 and was authorized to award a four-year Bachelor of Science in Education degree. Bain's new title became president of Wheelock College, a title she kept until her retirement in 1955. Bain served as the editorial board chairman of the Association for Childhood Education (ACEI) from 1940-1947, as president of the ACEI from 1947-1949, and as financial consultant to ACEI from 1950 until her death in 1965. She was a trustee of Wheelock College, a member of the U.S. Commission for Early Childhood Education, and from 1950-1956 a member of the executive board of the American Association of University Women (AAUW).
- Raymond M. Burrows (1906-1946), NC Music, Professor of Music Education, Columbia University
- Wilbert L. Carr (1875-1974), NC Latin, Professor of Latin, first head of Teachers College Department of Teaching Foreign Languages, president of the American Classical League from 1931 to 1937
- Miles A. Dresskill, (1896-1970), NC Music; in 1945, founded the first band department at Arizona State University
- Walter E. Hager (1895-1990), NC Secretary 1938 to 1939, president of Wilson Teachers College 1941 to 1955, President of DC Teachers College 1955 to 1958
- Otto Koischwitz (1902-1944), NC German, taught German at Columbia University and became a professor of German Literature at Hunter College, New York City. In the fall of 1939 Koischwitz was required by Hunter College to take leave of absence after putting anti-Semitic material into his lectures. He returned to Germany, resigning his position in January 1940. By the spring of 1940 Koischwitz was working as a program director in the U.S. A. Zone at the Reichs-Rundfunk-Gesellschaft, German State Radio. He broadcast talks to the U.S. under the pseudonyms "Mister O. K." and "Doctor Anders". His propaganda was directed to college students and German-American listeners who might be susceptible to the Nazis. He spoke on literature, music, drama, philosophy and geopolitics, his broadcasts being anti-Semitic, anti-British, anti-Roosevelt and anti-communist in tone.
- Lois Coffey Mossman (1877-1944), at Columbia, she and Frederick Gordon Bonser established the new field of "industrial arts" or "technology education"
- Florence Stratemeyer (1900-1980), NC Education, founding figure in the field of teacher education and curriculum. The cornerstone of Stratemeyer's professional life was the preparation of principled teachers who act upon reasoned beliefs. Stratemeyer's influence in teacher education far exceeded that of anyone in the United States during her 41-year service as a faculty member in the Department of Curriculum and Teaching at Teachers College, Columbia University.
- Peter Sammartino (1904-1992), NC French, founder of Fairleigh Dickinson University
- Agnes Snyder (1885-1973), NC Education, faculty at Bank Street Schools and Mills Schools, 1941 to 1946. Chairman of the Department of Education at Adelphi College from 1948 to 1957. Snyder wrote Dauntless Women in Childhood Education, 1856-1931 published by the Association for Childhood Education International (First Edition - June 1972).
- John Wilkinson Taylor (1906-2001), Unesco deputy director general, acting director general from 1952 to 1953. President of the University of Louisville from 1947 to 1950, he founded Neighborhood Colleges, including one for blacks, in branches of the Louisville public library. He also helped spur repeal of Kentucky's school segregation law.
- Goodwin Watson (1899-1976), was part of Kilpatrick's "Social Frontier." During 1925-1942, Watson earned the reputation of being not only a thoughtful activist and innovator but also a scholar and researcher. After World War II, he became chief of the Analysis Division of the Foreign Broadcast Intelligence Service, but within two years was forced out of office as a "disloyal citizen" by what was then known as the Dies Committee. He had gone to the Soviet Union and to Nazi Germany and had reported on features of their systems, including educational, that he considered promising. He held a professorship at Newark State College until 1970. In 1963, Watson and James P. Dixon were founders of the Union of Experimenting Colleges, an outgrowth of which was the creation of the University Without Walls.

== Notable alumni ==
- Mercer Ellington, son of musician Duke Ellington
- Nancy Frankel (Wechsler) (1916-2009), graduated at top of Columbia Law School Class of 1940, at a time when few women were admitted. Wechsler, a noted champion of civil liberties, was also a prominent copyright and intellectual property lawyer for seven decades. She won the John Ordronaux Prize, awarded annually for overall excellence and usually recognizes the student achieving the highest academic average in each graduating class.
- Isabel Lewis, niece of author Sinclair Lewis
- Sid Luckman (1916–1998), Hall of Fame NFL football player
