= Rushmore Records =

American record label

Rushmore Records was formerly a subsidiary of Drive-Thru Records. As of September, 2006, Rushmore became an imprint label due to the project being largely unsuccessful.

== History ==
In 2002, two years before the label's official establishment, Rushmore was supposed to be formed as a "new" Drive-Thru Records. The intention was to start the label up during Drive-Thru's distribution agreement with Geffen Records — restricting co-owners Richard and Stefanie Reines from full control over the roster, which is why they were reluctant to sign new talent — and eventually move all of Drive-Thru's bands over to Rushmore. This was meant to be a tactic to avoid Geffen taking over more of the label's roster.

During this time, the first signed artists to be announced were Self Against City and Houston Calls, shortly followed by Day at the Fair and The Track Record a week later. In early 2005, two bands were announced to join the existing four, Madison, and The Cover.

On May 1, 2006, Day at the Fair announced their breakup.

In September 2006, The Track Record parted ways with Rushmore based on the direction of the band. An announcement states: "As of September 1st, we are no longer affiliated with Drive-Thru / Rushmore Records. The split is due to disagreements regarding the direction of the band. While we maintain good terms with the label, there is no more progress to be made in the relationship."

Due to issues with the label's management, Madison decided to break up in September 2006. According to a press release written by the band, the main reason behind why they split was a lack of professionalism and laziness on part of the label. The band claimed, that a month passed before submitted demos were listened to and when questioned about this, the owners responded in an often vulgar and rude manner. In the wake of this, Richard Reines wrote a lengthy response criticising Madison's announcement, mentioning that they took nine months to record said demos, then – at a time when the label had other priorities – impatiently called every couple of days asking if the material had yet been listened to, and ultimately threatened with their breakup if they weren't allowed to start recording an album within two weeks. This came after Madison's original material was rejected as it was produced by Jesse Cannon. Reines stated that he wanted to hear new material because he didn't trust Cannon's ability to produce a full-length record. This was somewhat surprising given the fact that Madison had originally been signed to Rushmore Records after independently producing an EP with Jesse Cannon so all current material which Reine's had heard was produced by the same person. The result was that over 20 songs were recorded, produced, and mixed over an 18-month period which were never released and never received notes from the label heads.

Also in September 2006, the label dropped The Cover (whose signing was never announced). They rarely showed any activity during their brief time signed to the label.

Presently, Self Against City have finished recording their full-length Telling Secrets to Strangers (released January 9, 2007), while Houston Calls are about to release their second full-length, The End of An Error. (October 14, 2008)

=== Activity ===
Despite the label's lack of activity, the Rushmore Records logo has been used on various campaigns by owners Richard & Stefanie Reines. This includes a banner advertisement for You, Me, and Everyone We Know's EP, which was distributed by Drive Thru Records.

== Roster ==
- Houston Calls
- Self Against City

=== Former bands ===
- The Background
- The Cover
- Madison
- The Track Record
- The Mile After

== Release catalog ==
This is the release list of Rushmore Records in order of release number.

1. Self Against City – Take It How You Want It EP (2005)
2. The Track Record – The Track Record EP (2005)
3. Day at the Fair – The Rocking Chair Years (2005)
4. Houston Calls – A Collection of Short Stories (2005)
5. You, Me, and Everyone We Know – Party for the Grown and Sexy EP (2008)

== See also ==
- List of record labels
