= Office Products International =

British business magazine

Office Products International (OPI) is a British monthly magazine that reports on global issues affecting the office supplies sector. The headquarters of the magazine is in London.

Apart from its monthly magazine, OPI also provides other services to the office products industry. These include a daily news service on the opi.net website, special supplements, contract publishing, and conferences and awards dinners in Europe, North America and Asia.

== History ==
The first issue of OPI magazine came out in November 1991 and was released by its former publisher Mondiale Corporation Ltd. The company was then sold to Euromoney Institutional Investor PLC in June 1997. OPI was acquired by its current directors Steve Hilleard and Janet Bell in a management buyout in August 2006.

OPI ran its first conference in Palm Springs, California in November 1995.

The opi.net website went live in 1998.

The company's first awards event, the European Office Products Awards dinner, was held in 2002 in Montreux, Switzerland.

OPI's sister company OP Resource (OPR), a consulting and professional services firm focused exclusively on the office products industry, was formed in August 2007.

== Staff ==
The editor of OPI magazine is Heike Dieckmann. Andy Braithwaite is Editor-at-Large and Michelle Sturman is the Deputy Editor. Janet Bell is a director and the company's CEO is Steve Hilleard.
