= Aaron Task =

American journalist and host

Aaron Task is an American journalist and on-air host. From 2015 to 2016 he was Digital Editor of Fortune and the host of the podcast Fortune Unfiltered. From 2008 to 2015 he was Editor-in-Chief of Yahoo! Finance and the host of The Daily Ticker. In August 2015 he announced that he was leaving Yahoo. He previously worked at TheStreet.com in a variety of roles, including executive editor and SF bureau chief. Task was contributing editor for Barry Ritholtz's book Bailout Nation (Wiley, 2008). Task joined BlackRock as a VP of Marketing in June 2022. Task received a bachelor's degree in journalism from Rutgers university.
