= University School of Nashville =

Private school in Nashville, Tennessee, US

Location
- 2000 Edgehill Avenue; Nashville, Tennessee; United States; 36.1444°N 86.7985°W

Information
- Type: Private
- Established: 1975 (originally established as Peabody Demonstration School in 1915)
- CEEB code: 431725
- Director: Rob Hereford
- Faculty: 265
- Grades: K-12
- Gender: co-ed
- Enrollment: 1081
- Campus: Urban area
- Colors: Garnet, Columbia blue
- Athletics conference: TSSAA
- Mascot: Tiger
- Newspaper: The Peabody Press
- Website: www.usn.org

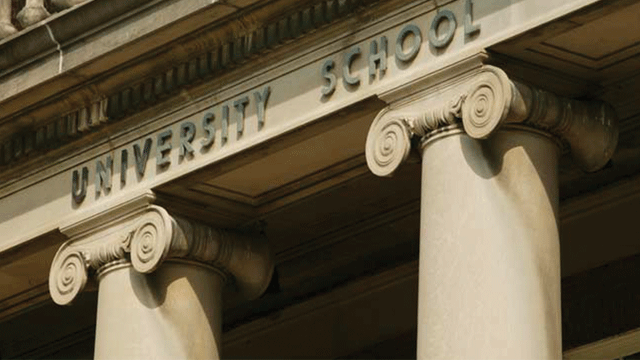

University School of Nashville is an independent, coeducational, day school located in Nashville, Tennessee.

== History ==
Referred to colloquially as USN, the school was founded in 1888 by the Peabody Board of Trustees. The school was first founded as Winthrop Model School; in 1915, it became Peabody Demonstration School (PDS), a part of Peabody College intended to demonstrate the operation of a school. The school was founded by Richard Thomas Alexander. While it was Peabody Demonstration School, it became the second high school in Nashville to be desegregated, following Father Ryan High School, and the first one to be fully desegregated, meaning that extra-curricular activities were desegregated in addition to academics. The demonstration school was closed in 1974, several years before Peabody merged with adjacent Vanderbilt University. The students' parents bought the school; by a student vote, the school was established as University School of Nashville.

Historically, USN has been recognized by the National Merit Scholarship Program. In the class of 2011, with 91 students, there were 12 semifinalists and 13 commended students recognized by the program. In 2010, both Presidential Scholars for Tennessee were USN students. USN also produced a Presidential Scholar in 2012 and in 2017.

== Facilities and campuses ==
Perhaps the largest addition to the school in its history came in 1998, when an 80-acre (32 ha) external campus was purchased for the purpose of housing athletic facilities. The River Campus currently houses a baseball field, a softball field, a full-sized track, and five multi-purpose fields that are rotated between men's and women's soccer, lacrosse, and ultimate frisbee. Construction has recently finished on tennis courts. In addition, this site originally had a 15-acre (61,000 m^{2}) sum of wetland, situated on the Cumberland River and Whites Creek. The original wetland was filled in for athletic fields and a new one of equivalent size was excavated and filled with water.

In 2003, USN opened the Christine Slayden Tibbott Center for the Visual Arts. The center also included a fitness center.

The next year, the school opened the Hassenfeld Library. This 20,000-square-foot (1,900 m^{2}) addition now houses 25,000 books, 2,400 educational videos, and 147 periodicals.

In 2012, USN revamped the cafeteria and dining area.

In 2015, as part of its 100-year anniversary celebration, the school revamped a large part of the 19th avenue entrance.

== Notable alumni ==
- Jad Abumrad, radio host, composer, and producer
- Richard Thomas Alexander, educator and education theorist
- Jenny Boucek, WNBA coach and player, NBA coach (Distinguished Alumnus Award, 2013)
- Lucius E. Burch Jr., attorney, civil rights activist, and conservationist (Distinguished Alumnus Award, 1984)
- Cheryl McKissack Daniel, civil engineer and businesswoman
- Ned Davis, financial analyst and company founder (Distinguished Alumnus Award, 1999)
- Gabe Dixon, musician
- John Early, comedian
- Phil Everly, singer
- Russ Freeman, jazz guitarist, founder of The Rippingtons (Distinguished Alumnus Award, 1995)
- Rosalind S. Helderman, journalist
- Bruce Henderson, founder of Boston Consulting Group
- Huell Howser, television personality, actor, producer, writer, singer, voice artist (Distinguished Alumnus Award, 2002)
- Akiko Ichikawa, New York City-based multidisciplinary artist and art writer
- Shooter Jennings, country music singer
- Mark Levine, former broadcast journalist and host of the nationally syndicated radio/television show Inside Scoop on Washington; member of the Virginia House of Delegates
- Robert K. Massie, author, historian, winner of the 1981 Pulitzer Prize (Distinguished Alumnus Award, 1983)
- Stanford Moore, chemist and winner of the 1972 Nobel Prize in Chemistry (Distinguished Alumnus Award, 1979)
- John Wilkinson Taylor, former president of the University of Louisville (Distinguished Alumnus Award, 1990)
- William Tyler, folk musician and guitarist
- David Vise, journalist and author, winner of the 1990 Pulitzer Prize (Distinguished Alumnus Award, 1992)
- Avon Nyanza Williams III, prominent attorney and son of famous civil rights lawyer Avon Nyanza Williams Jr., after whom Tennessee State University's downtown campus is named. Williams was general counsel of the Department of the Army in Washington at the time of his untimely death at the age of 45 in 2005.
- Susan Yeagley, actress
- Gideon Yu, sports executive and high-tech investor and advisor (Distinguished Alumnus Award, 2011)
