= BCA Research =

Research company

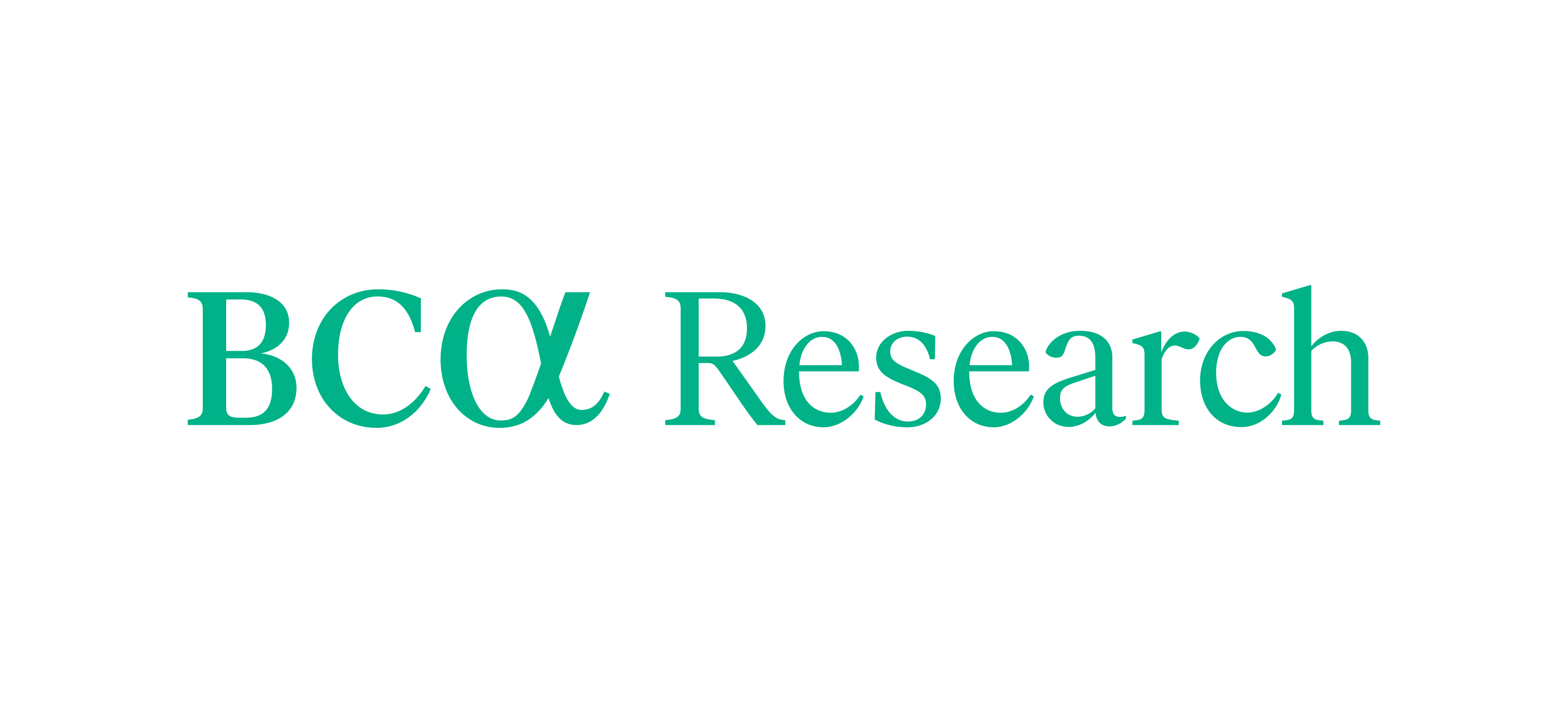
- BCA Research Logo
- Company type: Privately Held Company
- Industry: Financial services
- Founded: 1949
- Founder: A. Hamilton Bolton
- Headquarters: Montreal, Quebec, Canada
- Number of locations: New York, London, Hong Kong, Singapore, Shanghai and Sydney.
- Key people: Eric Jaffe, Chief Executive Officer Nicoletta Manoleas, Managing Director Peter Berezin, Chief Global Investment Strategist
- Website: bcaresearch.com

BCA Research Inc. (BCA) is an investment research company based in Canada. The firm is also sometimes referred to by the title of its first publication: The Bank Credit Analyst.

BCA provides analysis and forecasts of major asset classes and economies, with the goal of helping clients make investment decisions. The company delivers multiple types of research for a variety of uses and at various levels of detail, including global macroeconomic and geopolitical analysis, region-specific analyses of markets in locations such as the United States and China, and single asset research. They also provide tools and resources for portfolio analysis. The research is delivered to clients through live-streamed research meetings, daily insights, weekly bulletins, monthly and quarterly reports, special reports, chart packs, conferences, roadshows, podcasts, webcasts, digital/social platforms, and custom client calls.

Clients include portfolio managers, hedge funds, asset management firms, pension funds and endowments, central banks, security dealers, sovereign wealth funds, private banking, insurance companies, private equity firms, family offices, and individual investors.

BCA Research was recognized as the leading independent investment research firm in North America in 2010, and in Europe in 2011.

== History ==
BCA was founded in 1949 by A. Hamilton Bolton in Montreal, Quebec, Canada. Bolton was known for his work on the Elliot Wave Theory, and he published Money and Investment Profits, a book on investments and the business cycle, just prior to his death in 1967. He was succeeded by J. Anthony Boeckh, who led the company from 1968 to 2001. During that time, Bolton's original work on supercycles was refined into what BCA calls the "debt supercycle."

Euromoney Institutional Investor PLC (now Delinian, after a 2022 rebranding), expanding its global distribution and digital capabilities.

Today, BCA Research maintains a strong international presence with clients in over 90 countries and offices in key financial hubs including London, New York, Hong Kong, and San Francisco.

== Products and Services ==
BCA Research offers a diverse portfolio of 18 specialized research products, each designed to meet the specific needs of institutional investors across asset classes, geographies, and macroeconomic disciplines. These products are grouped into thematic research suites covering:

Global Macro Strategy: These services provide top-down economic insights, asset allocation frameworks, and long-term macro views. U.S. Investment Strategy Global Investment Strategy Emerging Markets Strategy Geopolitical Strategy Global ETF Strategy

Equity Strategy: Targeted insights for equity investors focused on regional, sectoral, and thematic trends. -U.S. Equity Strategy -European Equity Strategy Global Equity Strategy Quantitative Equity Strategy

Fixed Income & Credit: In-depth coverage of interest rates, bond markets, and credit conditions. Global Fixed Income Strategy Credit Strategy Emerging Market Fixed Income

Currency & Commodity Strategy: Guidance on FX markets and real assets. Foreign Exchange Strategy Commodity & Energy Strategy

Specialized & Tactical Services: These products deliver high-frequency updates, tactical positioning, and thematic research. Daily Insights / BCA Edge Platform Tactical Market Strategy Custom Research Services Chartbooks & Indicator Libraries

Each product includes: Regular written publications (weekly/monthly) Proprietary data models and indicators Thematic deep-dives and scenario analyses Direct access to BCA strategists via webinars or 1-on-1s
