= Michael Batnick =

American writer and blogger

- Born: Long Island, New York, U.S.
- Occupations: Financial analyst Author; Blogger
- Notable work: Big Mistakes: The Best Investors and Their Worst Investments
- Website: theirrelevantinvestor.com

Michael Batnick is an American author, blogger, and Chartered Financial Analyst from Merrick, New York. He runs the daily online blog the irrelevant investor, where he aims to educate people about investing. He is also a co-host of two weekly financial podcasts, Animal Spirits and The Compound and Friends.

In 2018, Batnick authored the book Big Mistakes: The Best Investors and Their Worst Investments. In the book, Batnick describes the ways in which the big name investors like Warren Buffett and Bill Ackman have failed and talks about the lessons learned that shaped more successful strategies for them going forward. Batnick is on the investment committee and is the director of research at Barry Ritholtz's Ritholtz Wealth Management LLC, a registered investment adviser firm.

Batnick has been featured in publications and media outlets, including CNBC, Bloomberg, Business Insider, and Barron's.
