= American Metal Market =

Industry news service

- Type: Subsidiary
- Industry: Media
- Founded: 1882
- Defunct: 2002 (print)
- Parent: Astorg, a private equity company
- Website: www.amm.com

American Metal Market (AMM) is an online provider of industry news and metal pricing information for the U.S. steel, nonferrous and scrap markets. Products include a daily publication available electronically, live news on the publication's website, a hard-copy magazine and a series of weekly newsletters covering niche markets. The publication also plays host each year to a number of industry conferences and events covering the state of various metal markets. It has been hailed for its impartial coverage of the mining and manufacturing sectors, said to be "as vital to the metal-buyer as the ticker is to Wall Street".

American Metal Market is a sister publication to London-based Metal Bulletin and was subsidiary of international publishing group Euromoney Institutional Investor. Metal Bulletin acquired AMM in April 2001. Both AMM and Metal Bulletin were part of a Euromoney subsidiary known as Fastmarkets.

In July 2022. Euromoney agreed to be sold to a pair of private equity (PE) companies. In the reorganization that followed, Fastmarkets was put under the management of PE company Astorg, which was one of the two PE companies that bought Euromoney.

== History ==
First published in 1882 as a weekly news and price paper and never having missed a scheduled publication date, American Metal Market is considered the longest continuously published newspaper in the industry. In April 2002, the daily publication switched from a traditional, hard-copy newspaper to a strictly electronic format, in which form it remains today.
