= David Callaway (journalist) =

American journalist

David Callaway (born 1963) is an American journalist.

== Early life and education ==
In 1986, he received a bachelor's degree and in 1987 he received a master's degree, both in journalism from the Medill School of Journalism at Northwestern University.

== Career ==
From October 1987 to January 1994, Calloway was a reporter for the Boston Herald, where he co-wrote a daily financial column on the Financial District, Boston.

From January 1994 to March 1999, Callaway was a reporter at Bloomberg News and led a team of financial reporters throughout Europe covering investing as well as the Northern Ireland peace process and the introduction of the Euro.

In March 1999, Callaway joined MarketWatch. He held the positions of executive editor and managing editor. He won two Society of American Business Editors and Writers awards for a weekly commentary column he wrote for 12 years.

In July 2012, he became editor-in-chief of USA Today.

In June 2016, he left USA Today to become CEO of TheStreet.com. He left the company in February 2019.

In March 2020, Callaway founded Callaway Climate Insights, a digital newsletter tied to the intersection of climate change and finance.

== Personal life ==
He is married to Nanci Tolan Callaway, and they have a daughter, Alexandra, born in 1993.
