= ITR (magazine) =

- Managing editor: Anjana Haines
- Categories: Law
- Frequency: Seven times a year
- Founded: 1989
- Company: Euromoney Institutional Investor
- Country: UK
- Based in: London
- Language: English
- Website: internationaltaxreview.com
- ISSN: 0958-7594

ITR, previously known as International Tax Review, is a business-to-business publication focused on news analysis of tax policy and tax advice from around the world. This remit includes transfer pricing, corporate tax and indirect tax, particularly VAT and sales tax. The magazine provides in-depth and strategic coverage of policy developments at the EU and the OECD, particularly the latter's BEPS project.

== History and content ==
International Tax Review was launched in London in November 1989 to cater to the tax services industry, publishing academic papers and covering court judgments on tax law. Over the years ITR has interviewed numerous politicians, including European commissioners Margrethe Vestager and Pierre Moscovici, as well as top tax professionals from companies such as Philip Morris, Microsoft and Johnson & Johnson.

ITR follows the debate on tax avoidance, inequality and wealth distribution, often reporting on the Tax Justice Network and scandals like the Paradise Papers. In one case, ITR covered a debate at the OECD between low-tax advocate Arthur Laffer and tax campaigner Richard Murphy on the impact of tax competition, whether it is possible to regulate tax competition and what such a regulatory framework would look like.

=== Range ===
Since the early 2000s, ITR has regularly organised conferences like the Global Transfer Pricing Forum, Women in Tax and the Indirect Tax Forum. At the same time, the magazine has published the World Tax Guide in which it rates law and accounting firms. This includes firms like Deloitte, EY, PwC and KPMG.

=== Awards ===
ITR's awards program recognizes leading tax and transfer pricing firms. The group hosts three award ceremonies annually, recognizing the best work carried out in the Asia-Pacific, EMEA and Americas regions. In 2020, Deloitte was announced as the biggest winner across the Americas. Caspian Legal Center from Azerbaijan, has been awarded as the Tax Firm of the Year in 2023 and 2024, and Transfer Pricing Firm of the Year in 2024 in the CIS region.

=== TP Week ===
ITR launched a sister publication called Transfer Pricing Week (later renamed TP Week) in 2007 to provide specialist coverage of international tax matters and policy, particularly issues like the arm’s length principle and controversies around EU state aid law. The publication ran until August 2019 when TP Week was wound up and the two platforms were merged into one.

=== Ownership ===
As part of the Legal Media Group (LMG), ITR is published by Euromoney Institutional Investor, one of the biggest finance and business publishing companies in Europe. Euromoney is a FTSE 250 company and was owned by the Daily Mail and General Trust Group until it was spun-off in 2019.
