= Madison (2000s band) =

American rock band

- Origin: Dumont, New Jersey, U.S.
- Genres: Pop punk
- Years active: 2001–2005
- Labels: Rushmore Records / Drive-Thru Records; Fidelity Records
- Past members: Steve Pic (vocals) Andrew Bruttomesso (Vocals, Guitar); Dennis Ortega (keyboard, vocals); Jonathan Snyder (bass); Rich Dieckhoff (drums); James Colleary (guitar); Brandon Pecoraro (guitar)

Madison was an American rock band from New Jersey during 2001-2006. After releasing their debut EP, For the First Time in Years... I'm Leaving You, under Fidelity Records, the band signed with Rushmore Records/Drive-Thru Records in 2005. While together, the band played over 200 shows including a stint on Van's Warped Tour in 2004 and several tours with label mates Hellogoodbye, Hidden in Plain View, Senses Fail, and Houston Calls. The band also appeared on the Drive-Thru Records / PureVolume compilation in 2005. Former bassist, Jonathan Snyder, played for Meg & Dia.

== Reunion ==
In July 2010, Madison reunited for a one-time only show at New Jersey's School of Rock.
