= Farewell (band) =

American pop punk band

- Origin: Greensboro, North Carolina, USA
- Genres: Pop-punk
- Years active: 2004–2012; 2022–present
- Label: Epitaph
- Members: Marshall Davis; Kevin Carter; Wil Andrews; Buddy Bell; Jeff Ellis; Chris Lee
- Past members: Martin Cagle; Jordan Bullock; Ryan Morgan; Joe Norkus
- Website: myspace.com/farewell

Farewell is an American pop-punk band formed in 2004 in Greensboro, North Carolina. They were signed to Epitaph Records releasing two CDs. After fulfilling their contractual obligations with the release of their second CD, the relationship with Epitaph ended.

== History ==
The band released its debut EP on May 24, 2005, entitled Poisoning the Lark, on Forsaken Records.

After posting new tracks on their MySpace page, Farewell was scouted by the owner of Epitaph Records, Brett Gurewitz who offered them a deal in March 2007. Preceded by the single "First One on the Blog" in August 2007, the band's first full-length album, Isn't This Supposed to Be Fun? appeared on the label on September 25, 2007. On October 10, 2007, a music video was released for "First One on the Blog". The album was released in The UK on February 4, 2008. Farewell was slated to tour the UK with Cartel in 2008, but the tour was cancelled. In June and July 2008, the band appeared on the Warped Tour. They then proceeded to tour the UK with You Me at Six and Houston Calls in October 2008.

Farewell cites punk rock bands such as Green Day, Jawbreaker and Alkaline Trio as influences. On July 25, 2008, Chris Lee left the band. On April 22, 2009, Kevin Carter was named The Triad's Best Guitarist of 2009 in YES! Weekly's reader's choice awards. In May 2009, the band supported Amber Pacific on their headlining US tour. Their second album entitled Run It Up the Flagpole was released on September 1, 2009.

After a hiatus in 2010, Farewell announced on October 16, 2011, that they are working on a new album to be released in the winter of 2012. Farewell once again began writing new material in the summer of 2013, though no new release date has been confirmed from the band.

== Discography ==
=== Albums and EPs ===
Release date	Title
March 24, 2005	Poisoning the Lark EP
September 25, 2007	Isn't This Supposed to Be Fun!?
September 1, 2009	Run It Up the Flagpole

=== Singles ===
Release date	Song	Album
March 24, 2005	"Kelley Green"	Poisoning the Lark EP
September 25, 2007	"First One on the Blog"	Isn't This Supposed to Be Fun!?

=== Music Videos ===
Year	Video	Album	Director
2005	"Kelley Green"	Poisoning the Lark EP	Dave Liberstein
2007	"First One on the Blog"	Isn't This Supposed to Be Fun!?	
2009	"Devoid (That's What I Think About It)"	Run It Up the Flagpole	
