= Gideon Yu =

American investor (born 1971)

- Born: May 14, 1971 (age 55); Seoul, South Korea
- Education: University School of Nashville; Stanford University (BS); Harvard Business School (MBA)
- Occupations: Co-owner and former president of the San Francisco 49ers
- Spouse: Susie Yu (korean:민혜정)
- Children: 2

Gideon Lee Yu (born May 14, 1971) is an American technology, media and sports investor, executive and advisor.

Yu is currently a co-owner of the San Francisco 49ers football team. He was previously the team president. In 2012, Yu became the first president of color in the history of the National Football League. Prior to his career in professional sports management, Yu was a high-technology executive, most notably as the chief financial officer of both Facebook and YouTube as well as the senior vice president and treasurer of Yahoo.

== Career ==
Yu graduated from the University School of Nashville in 1989, where he was student body president and received the Distinguished Alumnus Award in 2011. He then attended Stanford University, majoring in industrial engineering and engineering management and received his MBA from Harvard Business School in 1999. In 1989, he received the First Place Grand Award in Environmental Science at the 40th International Science and Engineering Fair.

In his time with the 49ers, Yu led the team's efforts in financing Levi's Stadium, including securing an $850 million stadium construction loan, the largest ever in professional sports, a $200 million financing package from the NFL and the largest long-term stadium financing in NFL history. Yu also directed the 49ers drive to accelerate the opening date of Levi's Stadium from the 2015 to 2014 season. Perhaps the most notable distinction during Yu's tenure at the San Francisco 49ers, however, is that he is the first president of color of any team in the history of the National Football League. He currently resides in Los Angeles.

Prior to joining the San Francisco 49ers football team, Yu was a General Partner at Khosla Ventures, where he led the firm's investment in Square and was the founding outside board member (Yu's board seat was later transferred to Vinod Khosla).

Previously, Yu was the chief financial officer of Facebook. Upon Yu's hiring, Facebook's founder, Mark Zuckerberg, speaking with the Wall Street Journal, said: "I consider it kind of a coup that we were able to recruit him here." Yu led the $375 million investment round from Microsoft and Hong-Kong billionaire Li Ka Shing at a then record $15 billion valuation. Zuckerberg further noted to the Wall Street Journal about Yu, "He's just excellent."

Before Facebook, Yu was a partner at Sequoia Capital, and was also the chief financial officer at YouTube where he negotiated its $1.65 billion sale to Google amidst a competitive auction for the company.

Prior to YouTube, Yu was the treasurer and senior vice president of Finance for Yahoo where he executed over 30 acquisitions/investments for Yahoo, including Alibaba, Taobao, Overture, Inktomi, Flickr, del.icio.us and over $5 billion of capital markets transactions. Prior to Yahoo, Yu was the chief financial officer of NightFire Software (acquired by NeuStar, NYSE: NSR) and held positions at Disney, Hilton, and DLJ / CSFB.

== Philanthropy ==
Yu serves on the board of trustees of the Monterey Bay Aquarium and the board of directors of Tipping Point Community. Yu is also active philanthropically at his alma mater, Stanford University, where he "made a significant commitment to undergraduate scholarships" and "is volunteering as a member of the School of Engineering Advisory Council and the School of Earth Sciences Task Force." He previously served on the boards of directors of the UCSF Medical Foundation, and BUILD.
