= Industrial Minerals =

Online service and magazine

- Frequency: online daily, monthly magazine
- Publisher: Euromoney Institutional Investor PLC
- First issue: October 1967
- Country: United Kingdom
- Website: www.indmin.com

Industrial Minerals (IM) publication is a specialist online service, supported by a monthly print magazine, covering all aspects of the non-metallic minerals industry, represented by its tagline: "from mine to market". It covers worldwide pricing, news, analysis and data on more than 70 minerals.

== History ==
Industrial Minerals was formed in 1967 as a spin-off from its parent publication, Metal Bulletin (MB), which had previously covered the industrial applications of mineral sands.

In 1995, IM launched Mineral PriceWatch (MPW) publication and North American Minerals News, a monthly newsletter which ceased in 2002.

Metal Bulletin PLC, owner of Industrial Minerals, was bought in 2006 by Euromoney Institutional Investor PLC, owned by Daily Mail and General Trust for 221 million British Pounds.
