= Brett Arends =

American writer

Brett Arends is an American journalist covering finance and investing. Since 2007, Arends has been a columnist for The Wall Street Journal (WSJ) and other Dow Jones publications, such as MarketWatch. He was a contributing editor and wrote a weekly column for WSJ's personal finance magazine, SmartMoney, until it closed in 2012. He now writes for the Wall Street Journal's online edition's R.O.I. or Return on Investment, daily.

== Biography ==
Born in Poughkeepsie, New York, Arends took a "double first" in History at Cambridge University, and did postgraduate research at Oxford University. Prior to joining the Wall Street Journal, Arends was a columnist and reporter for the Boston Herald and TheStreet.com, a financial news service. He has also written for Private Eye and the Daily Mail in London. He is a former analyst and consultant for the McKinsey & Co., a management consulting firm.

In 2012, Arends received a Best in Business Journalism award from the Society of American Business Editors and Writers (SABEW) for his columns in TheStreet.com. He was also part of a Boston Herald team that won two SABEW awards in 2006. He has appeared on 60 Minutes, PBS NewsHour with Jim Lehrer, CNBC, MSNBC, CNN, The John Batchelor Show, and many other radio and TV programs.

== Publications ==
- The Romney Files: From Bain to Boston to the White House Bid. CreateSpace Independent Publishing Platform. 2012. ISBN 9781479100910. — A biography of Republican presidential nominee Mitt Romney
- Storm Proof Your Money: Weather Any Economy, Rebuild Your Portfolio, Protect Your Future. Wiley. 2009. ISBN 978-0-470-48268-1. — A book about personal finance
- Spread Betting: The Football Fan's Guide to Spread Betting. Little, Brown Book Group. 2002. ISBN 9780751534115. — A book about sports gambling
