= Patrick Sergeant =

British journalist and businessman (1924–2024)

- Born: Patrick John Rushton Sergeant; 17 March 1924; Kent, England
- Died: 18 September 2024 (aged 100)
- Occupation: Journalist
- Years active: 1945–2018
- Known for: Euromoney
- Spouse: Gillian Anne Wilks
- Children: 2

Sir Patrick John Rushton Sergeant (17 March 1924 – 18 September 2024) was a British journalist, investor and businessman who was the founder of Euromoney Institutional Investor. Previously, he served as the City Editor of the Daily Mail from 1960 to 1984.

== Early life and education ==
Patrick Sergeant was born on 17 March 1924 in King's Down, Kent. He was the son of George Sergeant, a coal merchant, and Rene Sergeant, a converted Roman Catholic. He attended Beaumont College after his mother insisted on it over his father's preference for Harrow.

== Career ==
During World War II, Sergeant served as a lieutenant in the Royal Naval Volunteer Reserve (RNVR) from 1945 to 1948, where he was stationed on corvettes. After his military service, Sergeant joined Mullens & Co. a stockbroking firm and the official government broker in the bond market, with assistance from his aunt. He began his career as a messenger, a role he described as menial. His transition to journalism occurred after meeting Oscar Hobson, the City editor of the News Chronicle which he joined as a reporter in 1948. In 1953, he joined the Daily Mail, where he became joint deputy City editor. His writing led to a regular column on his travels in the Soviet Union, which was later expanded into the book Another Road to Samarkand (1955). He worked for the Daily Mail until 1984. Later, he served as a director of Daily Mail and General Trust Plc from 1992 to 2004.

In 1969, with financial backing from Viscount Rothermere, Sergeant launched Euromoney. In 1984, Sergeant was knighted by then-Prime Minister Margaret Thatcher.

Sergeant took retirement from the board of Euromoney in 2018.

== Writing ==
Sergeant authored several financial publications, including Money Matters (1967) and The Inflation Fighters Handbook (1976). In 1979, he received the Wincott Award for Financial Journalist of the Year.

== Personal life and death ==
Sergeant lived in The Grove, Highgate from 1961. He was married to Gillian Anne Wilks, a nurse-turned-artist from Cape Town, and they had two daughters, including Emma.

Sergeant turned 100 on 17 March 2024, and died on 18 September. He is buried on the eastern side of Highgate Cemetery.
