= BoardEx =

Global data company

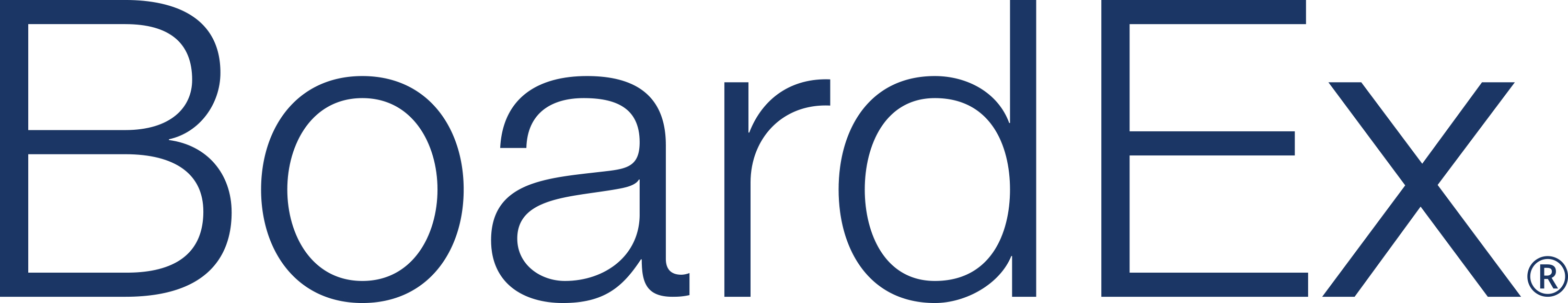
- Type: Subsidiary
- Industry: Relationship intelligence Business support services
- Founded: 1999
- Headquarters: London, United Kingdom
- Key people: Cameron Ireland - Chief Executive Officer; Dominick Sutton - Chief Data Officer
- Number of employees: 430
- Parent: Euromoney Institutional Investor
- Website: corp.boardex.com

BoardEx is a global data company specializing in relationship mapping and intelligence.

Founded in 1999, and with offices in New York, London and Chennai, BoardEx is a wholly owned subsidiary of Euromoney PLC, a member of the FTSE 250 share index.

BoardEx holds in-depth profiles of over one million of the world's business leaders and its proprietary software shows the relationships between and among these individuals. This information is updated daily. Its Relationship Capital Management platform is available in the cloud. Additional integration tools include application programming interfaces (APIs), data feeds and Salesforce app.

BoardEx is a subscription-based service, which is not "self referential". Each person in the database is individually researched as a result of their connection at senior level with a major company. Their team of 350+ analysts researches, verifies and maintains millions of company and director profiles daily. They update data within 24 hours from point of disclosure. Change detection technology alerts the team to management changes on company websites.

Its clients include companies and organizations within the banking, legal and professional services, executive search, asset and wealth management, private equity, academic and not-for-profit sectors.

== History ==
Management Diagnostics Ltd, also known as BoardEx, was originally registered in 1999 in the UK. The company spent £2 million on a prototype of the service to show investors. The product was developed with the help of Professor David Norburn, head of Imperial College Management School, Professor Donald Hambrick from Columbia Business School, and Professor Brian Boyd of Arizona State University. Boardex launched in 2001, and marketing for the service began in April 2002. An office in the United States was opened in early 2003. In May 2003, the Financial News said that "BoardEx is well placed to become a commanding force in the world's boardrooms." BoardEx received a boost in clients after the Higgs review on the effectiveness of non-executive directors was released in the UK. The company was privately funded until mid 2008 when Goldman Sachs took a minority interest. On October 7, 2014, TheStreet, Inc. acquired BoardEx for approximately $21 million at closing. The transaction was completed on November 3, 2014. In 2018, TheStreet announced the sale of BoardEx and The Deal to Euromoney Institutional Investor.

== Features ==
BoardEx consolidates public domain information concerning the board of directors and senior management of publicly quoted and large private companies. Since the data changes regularly, the database does not rely on annual reports.

Each company is represented by a Company Summary page, summarizing the Executive Directors, Non-Executive Directors and Senior Managers, the Board structure, remuneration, committee members and board movements.

Each individual profile has information on remuneration, including salary, bonuses, and incentive pay, and relational data, including education, notable achievements, other boards an individual is involved in, and the individual's age and experience compared to the sector. The database contains the name of current and past organizations, positions held and, wherever verifiable, the start and end dates of the association. This results in the creation of a network matrix qualified by organization and dates. The data is updated daily as share prices affect compensation information, such as incentive pay.

As of 2020, the service holds information on more than 1,800,000 profiles of organizations and over 1,300,000 people who work for them. The database is predominantly focused on North America, Europe and Australasia. Its proprietary software shows over 95 million first-degree relationships between and among these individuals.

=== Uses ===
Users can compile lists of their direct connections (first degree) and use these to identify connections to others (second degree) and in turn their connections (third degree). They can also create lists of an organization's client companies or individual contacts, as well as target lists of companies or individuals to discover connections between these to open up opportunities for personal introductions and referrals to new prospective clients. Searches can be made to identify potential candidates for Executive and Non-Executive board positions. Details of board structures, practices, remuneration, diversity, stability and characteristics can be obtained for purposes of academic research and corporate governance.

== Locations ==
BoardEx is headquartered in London, with offices in New York City and one research center in Chennai, India.

== Sites with comparable features ==
- Boardroom Insiders
- Equilar ExecAtlas
- Zoom Info
- Leadership Connect
- RelSci
