= David J. Morrow =

American journalist (1960–2010)

David Morrow (December 18, 1960 – February 1, 2010) became editor-in-chief of TheStreet.com in July 2001. Under his tenure, TheStreet.com won numerous journalism awards, including the prestigious Gerald Loeb Award in 2005 and three Society of Business Editors and Writers Awards.

In 2001, Out magazine named Morrow one of the year's 100 most successful gay people in the United States. He became the first Reynolds Endowed Chair of Business Journalism at the University of Nevada in Reno, Nevada, where he taught from August 2009 until his death on February 1, 2010. Morrow died of pancreatic cancer.
