= Herb Greenberg =

American journalist

Herb Greenberg (born June 8, 1952, in Miami, Florida) is an American financial journalist and investment researcher, known for his investigative reporting on publicly traded companies and his long-running newsletter Herb on the Street. Over the course of his career, he has worked across print, broadcast, and online media, and has co-founded two independent research firms.

== Early life and education ==
Greenberg was born in Miami, Florida, and earned a bachelor's degree in journalism from the University of Miami.

== Career ==
Greenberg began his reporting career at several local and business publications, including Crain’s Chicago Business, the St. Paul Pioneer Press, and the Chicago Tribune. He later became the Chicago Tribune’s New York Financial Correspondent and was the daily business columnist for the San Francisco Chronicle, where he wrote the six day-a-week Business Insider column. During this period, he also appeared as a business reporter on KRON-TV in San Francisco and was the monthly Against the Grain columnist for Fortune Magazine.

In 1998, Greenberg joined TheStreet as a senior columnist, a role he held for approximately six years. He subsequently wrote for MarketWatch and contributed a “Weekend Investor” column to The Wall Street Journal. After leaving journalism for a period, he co-founded GreenbergMeritz Research & Analytics, a subscription-based firm serving institutional investors.

In 2010, Greenberg became a senior stocks commentator at CNBC. He returned to TheStreet in 2013, where he launched the Reality Check newsletter. In 2014, he co-founded Pacific Square Research, a short-biased investment research firm, and remained with the company until 2021.

In October 2021, Greenberg became a senior editor at Empire Financial Research. In 2023, he launched Red Flag Alerts, a newsletter focused on identifying potential risks in publicly traded companies.

== Investigative Reporting and Impact ==
Greenberg is known for investigative work examining corporate disclosures, accounting practices, and governance issues.

== Later-Stage Career & Current Work ==
Beyond his corporate research ventures, Greenberg continues to publish. Through Herb on the Street, hosted on Substack, he offers market commentary, analysis, and both long- and short-biased insights. Through Red Flag Alerts, he specifically formulates risk-oriented research on individual companies, often highlighting securities he considers overvalued, under-scrutinized, or problematic.

== Recognition and Legacy ==
Greenberg is often cited for investigative business journalism across both traditional and digital media platforms. Over more than four decades, his work has influenced how both regulators and investors approach corporate disclosures and risk.

== Personal life ==
Greenberg resides in San Diego, California.

A native of Miami, Florida, Greenberg graduated from Coral Park High School and Miami Dade College before earning his B.A. in journalism from the University of Miami in 1974. In 1979 he was awarded a Davenport Fellowship for Business and Economic Reporting from the University of Missouri.
