= Emma Sergeant =

British painter (born 1959)

- Born: 9 December 1959 (age 66); London, England
- Education: Camberwell School of Arts; Slade School of Fine Art
- Spouses: Riccardo Pavoncelli; Adam Zamoyski
- Father: Patrick Sergeant
- Website: emmasergeant.com

Emma Sergeant (born 9 December 1959) is a British painter.

== Early life and education ==
Emma Sergeant was born on 9 December 1959 in London to Patrick Sergeant, a financial journalist. She received her education at the Camberwell School of Arts from 1978 to 1979 and at the Slade School of Fine Art from 1979 to 1983. During her studies, she won the National Portrait Gallery's Portrait Prize, becoming its youngest recipient at the time.

== Career ==
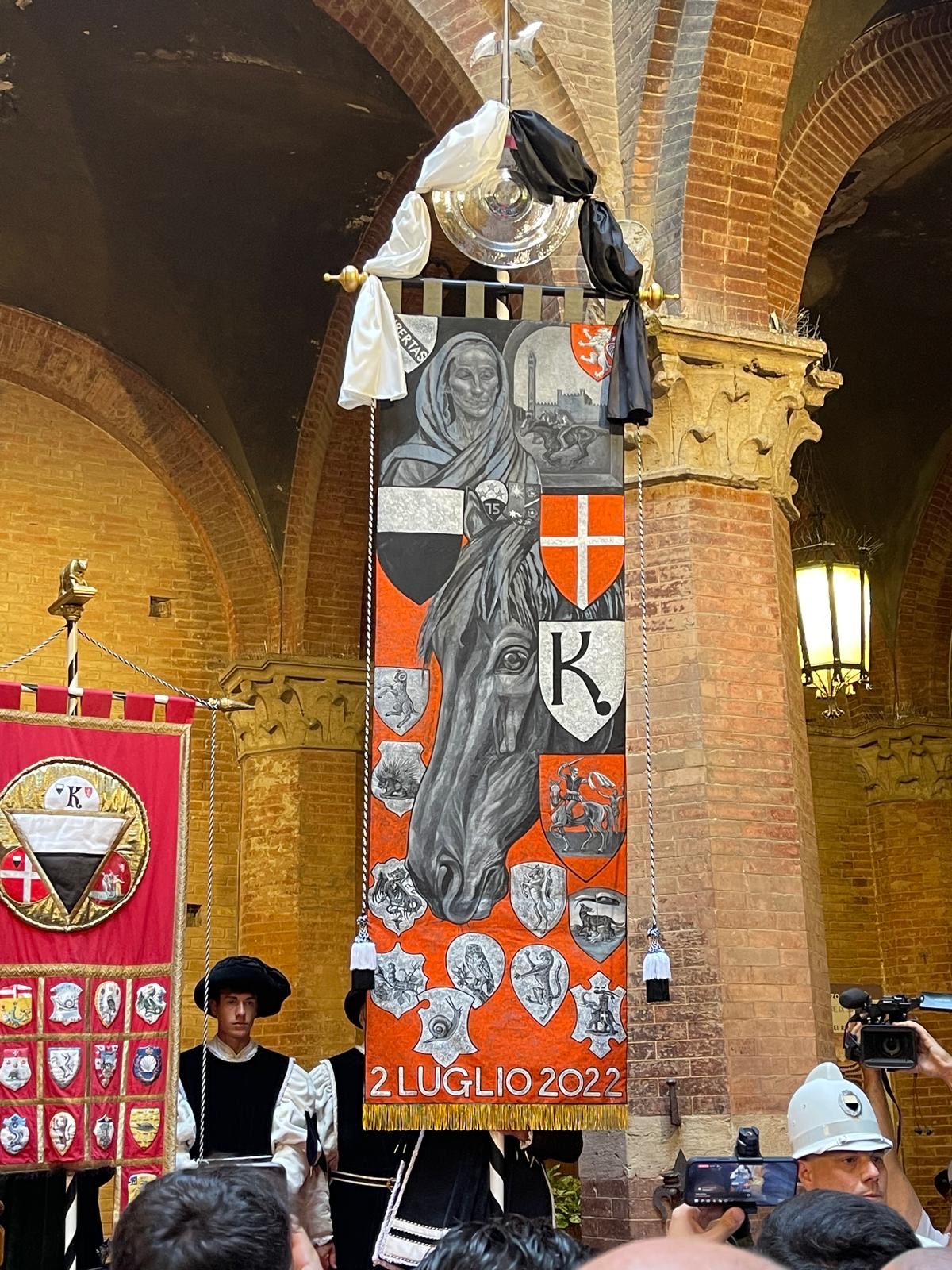
Drappellone, Siena 2022

Sergeant began her career with the debut exhibition at Agnew's in 1984, which sold out. Later, she traveled to the North-West Frontier Province of Pakistan to depict Afghan warriors and refugees during the war with Soviet Union. Over the years, she held additional exhibitions at Agnew's and the Fine Art Society, and a retrospective in Siena. She also had a solo show called Faces from Four Continents at Agnew's in London.

From 1995 to 1996, Sergeant served as the official artist to the Prince of Wales on tours of Egypt, Morocco, and Central Asia and has been his guest at both Highgrove and Sandringham. Her portraits include Sir Laurence Olivier, Sir David Cecil, the Duke of York, Imran Khan, and Jeremy Paxman. Several of her paintings are displayed at Highgrove, the residence of Prince Charles. Her last commissioned portrait was of the editor of the Daily Mail, Paul Dacre.

After seeing polo in Pakistan, Sergeant began playing the game in England and her later work is in equestrian art. She also briefly taught art to prison inmates through the Koestler Award Scheme.

Her exhibitions include Faces from Four Continents at Agnew's, Touch the Spirit in Siena (later shown in London), and From The Sea and Shades of Grey at the Fine Art Society. Some of her artwork has also appeared in the film The Lost Son.

In 2022, Sergeant painted the Drappellone for the Palio di Siena, which had resumed after a two-year pandemic hiatus. It was rendered in black and red gouache and featured a horse's head and a contemporary depiction of the Virgin Mary, which included her own facial features.

== Personal life ==
Sergeant has been married twice, first to Italian banker Riccardo Pavoncelli and later to historian Adam Zamoyski in 2001. She shares her time between London and Poland, where she and Zamoyski engage in painting, writing, farming and horse breeding. She owns two dogs: a bull terrier named Carmen, and a mongrel rescue dog named Doris.

Before her marriage with Pavoncelli, she had a four-year relationship with Imran Khan and a brief relationship with the Earl of Caledon.
