= You, Me, and Everyone We Know =

American rock band

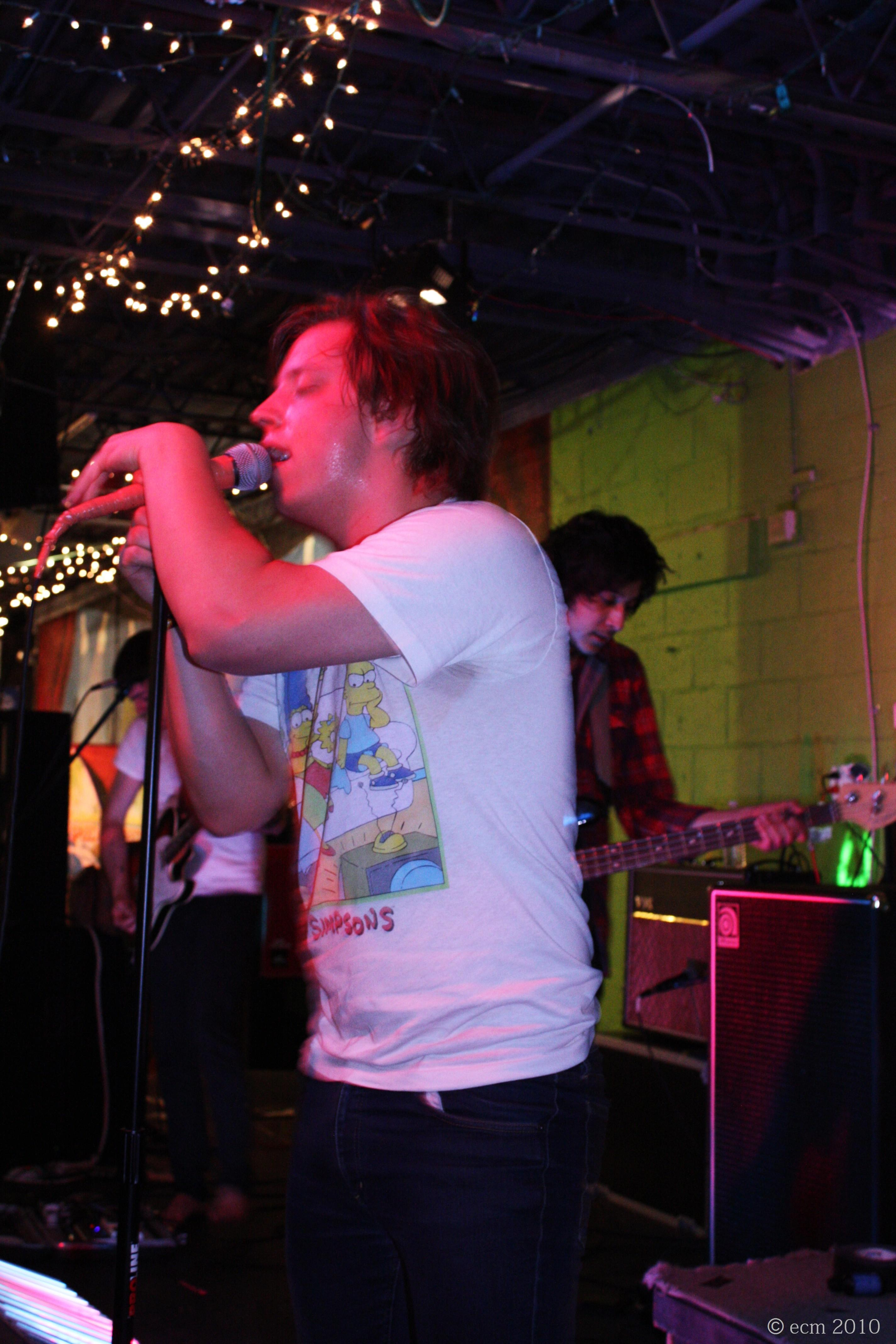

Background information
- Also known as: YM&EWK, YMAEWK
- Origin: Washington, D.C., U.S.
- Genres: Emo, indie rock, pop punk, power pop
- Years active: 2006–2011; 2012-2017; 2019–present
- Labels: Doghouse Records/Top Shelf Records; South by Sea
- Members: Ben Liebsch; Trevor Kiscadden; Ben Roth; Kory Gable; Blain Herman; Joe Fuscia
- Past members: Augustine Rampolla; Mike Ghazarian; Kyle Gibson; Rico Vigil; John Farrell; Dan Lee; Paul Martinez; Ryan Sherrill; Mike O'Rourke; Aaron Stern; Noel Milford; Justin Unruh
- Website: youmeandeveryoneweknowband.com

You, Me, and Everyone We Know is a rock band from Washington, D.C. After a decade-plus of lineup changes and hiatuses, the moniker has become a vehicle for singer-songwriter Ben Liebsch. The band has released ten EPs, one of which is a live EP, and two full-length albums.

== History ==
You, Me, and Everyone We Know formed in 2006 consisting of lead singer Ben Liebsch, guitarists Ryan Sherrill and Noel Milford, bassist Dan Lee, and drummer Paul Martinez. They recorded their debut EP, Party for the Grown and Sexy, with Trevor Simpson. The album received mostly positive reviews, with The Daily Chorus calling the work "a beacon that proves there are still bands that really enjoy the music they create" and gave the album an 8/10. Die Shellsuit, Die! gave the album a 9/10 and called the band "one of the funniest, most cheery, cheekily upbeat, smile inducing, rock-out-tastic fun poppy melodic pop-punk bands out there right now. Ever."

After releasing their debut EP, the rising outfit was noticed by Richard Reines and Stefanie Reines, co-founders of Drive-Thru Records, who offered to manage the band. While supporting Party for the Grown and Sexy, the band toured with various acts including The Color Fred, The Dear Hunter, I Am The Avalanche, Four Year Strong, and more. Later in 2007, Dan Lee was replaced by bassist Mike O'Rourke, and in January 2008, Rico Vigil joined the band to play keyboard.

In early 2008, a free download of Party for the Grown and Sexy was released on line, quickly reaching 30,000 downloads. For Valentine's Day, the band contributed a cover of The Foundations' song "Build Me Up Buttercup" on the compilation album Rockin' Romance 2 released by Destiny Worldwide in June 2010.

In Spring of 2008, You, Me, and Everyone We Know toured on the Drive-Thru Records' Small Fries Tour with Socratic and Say No More. Garnering more notoriety, the act was anointed "one of the east coast's biggest bands that you've never heard of" by PunkNews.org shortly before dates at South by Southwest and The Bamboozle. Then, in June, the band kicked off a tour with Just Surrender, Every Avenue, and The Morning Light. After the tour, it was announced that drummer Aaron Stern, formerly of Matchbook Romance, had replaced Paul Martinez. Before Stern joined, the outfit was forced to play a few acoustic sets before finding guest drummers to fill in, including Steve Miller. Shortly afterwards, the new lineup played various dates of Warped Tour 2008. In a New Yourk Times article, their Warped Tour performance at the Uniondale, NY date was described as "charming and skilled," while Liebsch is quoted as saying "You guys [fans] are supporting a very independent band. There are lots of dependent bands playing elsewhere," embracing You, Me, and Everyone We Know's independent nature.

While on tour with The Dear Hunter and Lydia, during August 2008, the band's van caught fire in South Carolina, along I-85. With most of the band's possessions destroyed, Aaron Stern recalled the conversation prior to the fire, "We were actually mid-argument about releasing new music on our own when the tire initially blew. After we watched the van burn up, we kind of took it as a sign to get our tails in the studio."

The resulting effort was the EP So Young, So Insane, produced by Motion City Soundtrack's Joshua Cain. Shortly before the record was recorded, guitarist Ryan Sherrill and bassist Mike O'Rouke left the band. The record was very well received, and marked the band's first collaboration with Max Bemis, who provided additional vocals on I Can Get Back Up Now. In support of the new EP, You, Me, and Everyone We Know toured with Sing It Loud and Take Cover, finishing the year on a full US tour with I Set My Friends On Fire.

You, Me, And Everyone We Know suffered a nearly fatal mass exodus, leaving only Liebsch in early 2009. Liebsch and Vigil later recruited guitarist Augustine Rampolla to join the band, along with a varying cast of guitarists, bassists and drummers over the next two years. The rest of 2009 brought tours with Valencia and Houston Calls, a supporting slot on Forgive Durden's Razia's Shadow Tour, and another stint on Warped Tour. They were also given a place on Alternative Press' 100 Bands You Need To Know in 2009.

After a spring headlining tour in 2010 with Breathe Carolina, We Are The In Crowd, and Stay, the band released their first single, Some Things Don't Wash Out, from their upcoming debut full-length album of the same title in June. Dates with Hit The Lights, Cartel, The Bigger Lights, and The Graduate followed. In September, You, Me, And Everyone We Know headlined their Can We Do Laundry At Your House Tour with Take Cover and Queens Club.

After nearly three years of writing, on October 12, 2010, the album Some Things Don't Wash Out was released by Doghouse Records, now the band's label, to overwhelmingly positive reviews. Dead Press gave it 7/10 stars, and Alternative Press gave it 3.5/5 stars calling 'the disk diverse: One minute the group are awash in big-band swing, the next they're entrenched in bursting pop-punk." In support of the album, the band played dates with acts such as Man Overboard, Sparks the Rescue, I Can Make A Mess Like Nobody's Business, and Hellogoodbye.

The band started the next year on Hellogoodbye's Winter Tour 2011, before landing a place on The Glamour Kills Tour 2011 alongside The Ready Set, Allstar Weekend, We Are The In Crowd, and The Downtown Fiction. Later, for then undisclosed reasons, the band dropped off of The Glamour Kills Tour, their biggest tour to date.

On April 20, 2011, You Me, and Everyone We Know announced they would be breaking up in a post by all members of the band, save Liebsch, saying "that it recently came to light that Ben had made some decisions that directly affected us as people and to the band as an entity throughout its existence, and we just felt these issues coming to light were irreparable for us, making it a situation where we couldn’t imagine getting back in the van or writing a song with him.”

This press release was followed by a statement from Liebsch, in which he apologies to “everyone I’ve let down with my actions that led to this news.” He also implies alcoholism as a reason for the band’s splits saying, “I’m going to focus on staying sober and getting some help fixing the parts of me that make such bad decisions."

In a follow-up post via Tumblr, Liebsch admits that “[f]or almost 4 years I’ve used the band’s money to enable my drinking.” Controversy ensued after former guitarist Augustine Rampolla responded with a post of his own claiming Liebsch “was NOT an alcoholic and did NOT have a drinking problem," that he was a "pathological liar," and that Liebsch had stolen money from the band on a much larger scale than he admitted.

The aptly EP titled, Things Are Really Weird Right Now was released in May 2011, after the band had already broken up.

On October 18, 2011, Liebsch, on his own under the moniker, played an acoustic show at The Barbary in Philadelphia.

In November 2012, Liebsch, continuing as You, Me, and Everyone We Know, released a new EP, A Great Big Hole, leading to a headlining tour in the spring of 2013 supported by Squid the Whale and The Orphan, The Poet, where Liebsch played guitar and sang without a full band behind him. Another solo EP, I Wish More People Gave A Shit, was released days before the tour was scheduled to begin. Both EPs were recorded with longtime collaborator Trevor Simpson and self-released.

In late 2014, AltPress reported that “You, Me, and Everyone We Know have returned from the grave for a new EP, titled Dogged, with [new label] South By Sea Music", then released a surprise EP entitled A Mutty Christmas in time for the holiday season.

Released on March 17, 2015, Dogged was universally praised by a number of independent music reviews, noting the EP was “surprising, innovative but at the same time recognizable,” and that “[b]asically, Liebsch is once again proving that he’s a lyrical genius with Dogged.”

In support of the record the band would embark on tour with Have Mercy and Weatherbox, followed by the Rather Be Dead Than Cool Tour with Forever Came Calling, and Like Pacific, among others.

In March 2016, Ben Liebsch announced: “After a decade of ups and downs, I have decided to put this band to rest,” along with announcement of a goodbye show in Philadelphia at Creep Records.

The band briefly reunited in February 2017 for a performance at Reggie’s Rock Club in Chicago benefitting photographer Ashley Osborn. This was intended to be the final performance of You, Me, and Everyone We Know, and in 2020 the performance was mixed into a live album titled Alive in Chicago.

In 2019, Liebsch released a new song, (Still) Basically A God, marking the band’s return from their 2016 hiatus.

In an Alternative Press interview in November 2019, Liebsch opened up about his mental health issues caused by childhood trauma, and how stress and unhealthy living lead to the band’s 2016 hiatus. He also detailed a new approach to You, Me, and Everyone We Know including avoiding touring “unless someone comes to the band with an offer [that] replaces all of our incomes. The music industry has been historically unwilling to do that for any band, let alone my little enterprise here.” He added “I’m opening to all things except for becoming unwell mentally again.”

In 2020, coming up on ten years of sobriety, during another AltPress interview, Liebsch announced the release of the new single F.I.N.E. while discussing the band’s future: "The general idea has been figuring out how to do this sustainably and in a way that creates a little more freedom for us and me. We’re working on one or two songs at a time and releasing them on a quarterly basis. We live in an attention economy: Release the song, make a big fuss about a show, record or finish another song, eventually making our way toward next year."

F.I.N.E. was quickly followed up by Radical! Change, a two song EP, following the civil unrest in the United States over police brutality.

== Personnel ==
- Ben Liebsch: Vocals (2006–present)
- Ben Roth: Rhythm Guitar (2014–present)
- Joe Fuscia: Bass Guitar (2014–present)

=== Former members ===
- Trevor Simpson: writing partner (2012–2015)
- Kory Gable: Lead Guitar (2014–2020)
- Rico Vigil: keyboard, guitar, mandolin, percussion bass, vocals (2008–2009 and 2010-2011)
- John Farrell: keyboard, trumpet (2010–2011)
- Augustine Rampolla: guitar, vocals (May 2009 – 2011)
- Noel Milford: guitar, vocals (2006 – May 2009)
- Josh Poole: guitar (2006–2007)
- Ryan Sherrill: guitar, vocals (2006–2008)
- Mike Ghazarian: bass, vocals (2010–2011)
- Mike O'Rourke: bass, vocals (2007–2008)
- Dan Lee: bass (2006–2007)
- Blain Herman: Drums (2014–2019)
- Kyle Gibson: drums (2010–2011)
- Aaron Stern: drums (2008–2010)
- Paul Martinez: drums (2006–2008)

== Discography ==
=== Studio albums ===
- Some Things Don't Wash Out
  2010: Doghouse Records
- Something Heavy
  2021: Know Hope Records (sub-label of Refresh Records)

=== EPs ===
- Party for the Grown and Sexy
  2008: Rushmore Records
- So Young, So Insane
  2008: Independent (Self-released)
- Things Are Really Weird Right Now
  2011: Topshelf Records
- A Great Big Hole
  2012: Thunderbeard Records
- I Wish More People Gave A Shit
  2013: Independent (Self-released)
- A Very Mutty Christmas
  2014: Independent (Self-released)
- Dogged
  2015: South By Sea / Rude Records
- Little Elephant Sessions (Live)
  2016: Little Elephant Records
- Radical! Change
  2020: A Few Good Records
- F.I.N.E.
  2020: VRP Records
