= Institutional Investor (magazine) =

Monthly magazine founded in 1967

- Editor: Michael Corcoran
- Frequency: Annual subscription
- Circulation: Digitally delivered (online only)
- Publisher: Euromoney Institutional Investor
- Founded: 1967
- Country: United States
- Based in: New York City
- Language: English
- Website: institutionalinvestor.com
- ISSN: 0020-3580

Institutional Investor magazine was a periodical published by Euromoney Institutional Investor. It was founded in 1967 by Gilbert E. Kaplan. A separate international edition of the magazine was established in 1976 for readers in Europe and Asia. The magazine ceased its print format in April 2018.

== History ==
Capital Cities Communications purchased the magazine in early 1984. The Walt Disney Company bought Capital Cities in 1996 and sold the magazine to Euromoney one year later. Institutional Investor has offices in New York City, London and Hong Kong. In 2018, Institutional Investor became digital only.

In March 2021, it was announced that Diane Alfano, the CEO of Institutional Investor, would be stepping down effective June 30, 2021. Alfano has worked at Institutional Investor since 1984. According to the announcement, her resignation comes as Euromoney, the publication's publicly traded parent company, plans to merge Institutional Investor with sister companies BCA Research and NDR into an asset management division. As of May 2021, the CEO of the new unit is Francis Cashman.

== Research and rankings ==
Institutional Investor published global research and issues rankings throughout the year that often served as industry benchmarks. Latterly, this was provided through Institutional Investor Research. Top-line results were published in the magazine during its time in publication while the full details are published on the II Research website (now Extel). The rankings include:

== Executive teams ==
- The All-America Executive Team
- The All-Europe Executive Team
- The All-Asia Executive Team (excludes Japan)
- The All-Japan Executive Team
- The Latin America Executive Team

== Research teams ==
- The All-America Research Team
- The All-Europe Research Team
- The All-Asia Research Team (excludes Japan)
- The All-Japan Research Team
- The All-China Research Team
- The Latin America Research Team
- The All-Brazil Research Team
- The All-India Research Team
- The All-America Fixed-Income Research Team
- The All-America Research Team Rising Stars
- The All-Europe Fixed-Income Research Team
- America's Top Corporate Access Providers
- Asia's Top Corporate Access Providers
- The Emerging EMEA Research Team
- Europe's Top Corporate Access Providers
- Japan's Top Corporate Access Providers
