= Self Against City =

US musical group

- Origin: Sacramento, California, United States
- Genres: Rock, indie rock, pop rock
- Years active: 2004–2009
- Labels: Drive-Thru Records
- Past members: Jonathan Michael; Jack Matranga; Jeff LaTour; Blake Abbey; Justin Barnes; Patrick O'Connor; Chris Trombley

Self Against City was a pop rock band from Sacramento, California best known for their single "The Process." They formed in 2004 and were the first band to sign to Rushmore Records. The five-piece band made an EP (2005's Take It How You Want It), as well as a full-length album Telling Secrets to Strangers (2007).

== History ==
Self Against City formed in April 2004 in Sacramento, California, when vocalist Jonathan Michael, guitarists Jack Matranga and Jeff LaTour, bassist Patrick O'Connor and drummer Chris Trombley decided to record songs together.

The quintet pooled their cash and recorded three songs at Fat Cat Studios in Sacramento, California. The songs were uploaded to their PureVolume profile, a link to which was forwarded to Drive-Thru Records owner Richard Reines by a fan of the band. He soon approached the band and asked for more material. Upon hearing the songs, Reines invited the band to play a showcase in Los Angeles for him and Drive-Thru co-owner Stefanie Reines. That same night over dinner, the two offered the band a record deal. On November 6, 2004, Self Against City officially became the first band to sign to Rushmore Records, only a few months after their formation.

Their first act as a signed band was to record a cover of Darlene Love's "Alone on Christmas" for the Drive-Thru Christmas compilation Happy Holidays from Drive-Thru Records and a sixth song for their debut EP, advance copies of which had been given out at a show at the Boardwalk in Orangevale, California on October 28, 2004. Take It How You Want It finally hit music store shelves on April 5, 2005, while the band embarked on their first nationwide co-headlining tour with Houston Calls the same month. They hit a total of 32 cities across 18 states. Upon returning home in July, LaTour left the band. Though initially the band made efforts to replace LaTour – Blake Abbey of the Daytona Beach, Florida band Abagnale sporadically filled in as a rhythm guitarist – they soon decided to continue on as a four-piece and began writing songs for their first full-length record. Two days before the band left for recording in March 2006, LaTour decided to rejoin.

Self Against City began recording their full-length album Telling Secrets to Strangers in April 2006 with producers Steve Haigler and Mike Watts in Long Island, New York. According to Jack Matranga, the album was written as an upbeat pop-rock album. After two weeks of tracking and one week of mixing the album was completed. In June 2006, a month after returning home from recording, O'Connor and Trombley left the band. Drummer Justin Barnes (formerly of Simplistic) officially joined the band in August 2006, two days before the band left for tour with Houston Calls and Quietdrive, while Hunter MacDonald (whom the band met while on tour with JamisonParker temporarily filled in on bass. Towards the end of the year, in search of a new permanent bassist, the group once again recruited fellow vocalist/bassist Blake Abbey in December 2006.

In January 2007 Self Against City hit the road with Boys Like Girls and We The Kings on a nationwide tour across America. Later that year the "SAC Pack" went out on the road with Valencia and Forever the Sickest Kids.

=== Original members ===
- Patrick O'Connor – bass
- Chris Trombley – drums
- Jeff LaTour – rhythm guitar
- Jonathan Michael – vocals
- Jack Matranga – guitar

== Discography ==
=== Albums ===
- Telling Secrets to Strangers (2007)

=== EPs ===
- Take It How You Want It (2005)

=== Singles/Videos ===
From Take It How You Want It:

- "The Process (Tonight)" (2005)

From Telling Secrets to Strangers:

- "Becoming a Monster" (2007)

=== Non-album tracks ===
- "Alone on Christmas" – released on Happy Holidays from Drive-Thru Records (2004)

=== Demos ===
- "RUAH" (2008)
- "Satellites" (2008)
- "Gold" (2008)
- "Band on the Run" (2008)
- "Kiss And Run" (2005)
- "Held Hostage with an Unloaded Weapon" (2003)
- "Echo Off The Headstone" (2008)
