= Euromoney =

English-language monthly magazine

- Editor: Louise Bowman
- Categories: Business and management magazines
- Frequency: Monthly
- Circulation: 25,000
- Publisher: Euromoney Institutional Investor
- First issue: 1969
- Country: United Kingdom
- Based in: London
- Language: English
- Website: euromoney.com
- ISSN: 0014-2433

Euromoney is an English-language monthly magazine that covers business and finance. It was first published in 1969, it is the flagship production of Euromoney Institutional Investor plc.

== History and profile ==
Euromoney was first published in 1969 by Sir Patrick Sergeant. The magazine is headquartered in London.

Sergeant continued to manage the business until 1985 and remains as co-president of the company. Daily Mail and General Trust plc is the largest shareholder in the company. DMGT's principal shareholder, Jonathan Harmsworth, 4th Viscount Rothermere, is co-president of Euromoney Institutional Investor.

Euromoney covers global banking, macroeconomics and capital markets, including debt and equity. The magazine features comment, profiles and interviews with chief executives and senior figures in finance.

In 2004, Euromoney published the first book exclusively on sukuk investments, Islamic Bonds: Your Issuing, Structuring and Investing in Sukuk. It was co-authored by the Islamic banking specialist Nathif Jama Adam.

== Industry-specific publications ==
=== Euromoney Market Data ===
Euromoney Market Data is an online service that allows its users to analyse, download and distribute data from the Euromoney FX Survey in a time series from 2007 through to 2011. Users can view results granularity by client type, client geographic location and client service priorities. Euromoney Market Data contains results for bank volume and market share, bank qualitative ratings and consumer preferences.

=== Euromoney Country Risk ===
Euromoney Country Risk allows users to access live data from Euromoney's country risk survey. Published semi-annually since 1993, the survey uses economists' assessments of political, economic and structural risk to provide country rankings for 186 markets worldwide. Data includes bank stability, monetary policy/currency stability, corruption and institutional risk. The survey assesses qualitative factors: economic risk, political risk and structural risk. It also assesses quantitative factors – access to bank finance/capital markets and debt indicators – plus credit ratings. As of 2018, Singapore was ranked as the least risky country with a score of 88.53 out of 100.
