= TheStreet =

US financial news and financial literacy website

TheStreet, Inc.
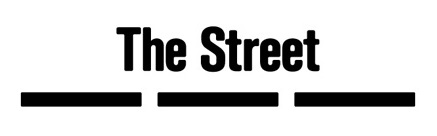
- Company type: Subsidiary
- Founded: 1996; 30 years ago
- Headquarters: New York City, U.S.
- Founders: Jim Cramer; Marty Peretz
- Key people: Daniel Kline (Co-Editor in Chief); Todd Campbell (Co-Editor in Chief)
- Industry: Publishing
- Products: Financial literacy website
- Parent: The Arena Group
- Website: www.thestreet.com

TheStreet is a financial news and financial literacy website. It is a subsidiary of The Arena Group. The company provides both free content and subscription services such as TheStreet Pro, a stock recommendation portfolio managed by Chris Versace. TheStreet was founded by Marty Peretz and Jim Cramer, and the site boasted numerous notable former contributors, including Aaron Task, Herb Greenberg, and Brett Arends.

== History ==
=== 20th century ===
TheStreet, Inc., formerly TheStreet.com, Inc., was co-founded in 1996 by Jim Cramer and Marty Peretz. It became a public company via an initial public offering in May 1999, under the direction of former CEO Kevin English and former CFO Paul Kothari.

Dave Kansas became editor-in-chief in April 1997. Kansas also opened a San Francisco bureau and was a member of the board of directors.

In 1999, at the peak of the dot-com bubble, the market capitalization of the company was $1.7 billion. Indeed, on May 5, 1999, the day of its IPO, the stock went from $19 a share to as high as $73 a share. The stock settled at $59 on its first day of trading.

=== 21st century ===
In July 2001, David J. Morrow, a former reporter for The New York Times, joined TheStreet, Inc. as its editor-in-chief upon Kansas's departure. Glenn Hall, a former news manager at Freedom Communications (The Orange County Register) and Bloomberg News, replaced Morrow in August 2009. William Inman, former Bloomberg News Editor, replaced Glenn Hall as editor-in-chief in March 2012. Janet Guyon, from Fortune, The Wall Street Journal, Bloomberg, and Investopedia replaced William Inman in April 2014.

Under the direction of former chairman and CEO Thomas J. Clarke Jr., the company reported its first annual profit in 2005. Jim Cramer became chairman in October 2008 and served until 2011.

Daryl Otte, a long-time company director, became CEO in May 2009 after the resignation of the former CEO, Thomas Clarke. Otte is the founding partner of Montefiore Partners, a venture capital investment fund management firm, and a former executive at media company Ziff Davis. On March 7, 2012, Elisabeth DeMarse was hired as CEO and president, replacing outgoing CEO Daryl Otte.

In April 2007, the company acquired Stockpickr.com.

In August 2007, the company acquired Corsis, including Promotions.com, for $20.7 million. It was sold to management for $3.1 million in December 2009. Executives of the company were later accused of inflating revenues and paid penalties to the U.S. Securities and Exchange Commission.

In November 2007, the company acquired BankingMyWay and RateWatch. In 2008, the company acquired a 13% stake in Geezeo.com, a Boston-based online management tool, with an option to purchase the entire company.

In September 2012, the company acquired The Deal LLC, a media company that covers mergers and acquisitions. The site was sold in February 2019. In April 2013, TheStreet Inc. acquired financial newsletters The DealFlow Report, which covers microcap stocks, including initial public offerings and private placements, and The Life Settlements Report, which focuses on life insurance settlements, as well as the PrivateRaise database.

In November 2014, the company acquired BoardEx for $22.5 million. BoardEx was sold in December 2018.

In June 2016, David Callaway left USA Today to become CEO of TheStreet.com.

In June 2018, the company sold Rate Watch to S&P Global for $33.5 million.

In February 2019, the company sold The Deal and BoardX for $87 million. David Callaway left as CEO and was replaced by Eric Lundberg.

In August 2019, the Maven acquired the company for $16.5 million. The company also partnered with Sports Illustrated Fantasy to launch Bull Market Fantasy with Jim Cramer, a channel offering insights, analysis and tips for winning fantasy sports leagues.

During the 2020 COVID-19 pandemic in the United States, TheStreet received between $5 million and $10 million in federally backed small business loans from JPMorgan Chase Bank as part of the Paycheck Protection Program. The company stated the loans would allow it to retain 15 jobs.

In 2021, theMaven rebranded itself as The Arena Group.

In April 2024, Todd Campbell was appointed Deputy Managing Editor of TheStreet.

In March 2025, Todd Campbell and Daniel Kline were appointed co-Editor in Chief.

== International activities ==
In December 1999, TheStreet entered an agreement with the Israeli newspaper publisher Haaretz, to invest $2.25 million in exchange for a 25% stake in TheMarker, a new business news website in Hebrew and English. According to the investment agreement, TheStreet.com published selected news and articles on Israeli technology companies from the TheMarker site, and in exchange, TheMarker published selected news and articles from TheStreet.com. Following the burst of the dot-com bubble, the investment in TheMarker was fully impaired.

In February 2000, TheStreet launched a United Kingdom edition, thestreet.co.uk;. It withdrew funding after nine months and the UK edition closed in November 2000.
