= Fastmarkets MB =

International publisher

Metal Bulletin
- Categories: Specialist information provider
- Frequency: Weekly
- Publisher: Delinian
- Founded: 1913
- Based in: London, England
- Language: English
- Website: www.metalbulletin.com
- ISSN: 0026-0533

Fastmarkets MB, previously known as Metal Bulletin, is a specialist international publisher and information provider for the global steel, non-ferrous and scrap metals markets.

== History ==
What was later known as Metal Bulletin was started in 1913 as Quin's Metal Market Letters, a subscription newsletter, transitioning to Metal Bulletin journal two years later. The publication provided price and other information for the steel and non-ferrous metals markets and was published twice a week. In 1967 the company introduced a spin-off publication, Industrial Minerals, which covered non-metallic minerals industry. In 2001 Metal Bulletin bought American Metal Market. Metal Bulletin PLC was in turn bought in 2006 by Euromoney Institutional Investor, owned by the Daily Mail & General Trust for £221 million.

== Products and services ==
Metals covered include carbon steel, stainless and special steel, scrap and secondary, ores and alloys, raw materials, minor and precious metals, and base metals with additional coverage of freight news, capital markets, and exchange news and prices.
