= Barry Ritholtz =

American finance author

- Born: 1961 (age 64–65)
- Education: Stony Brook University, Yeshiva University - Wilf Campus, Benjamin N. Cardozo School of Law
- Occupations: Founder of Ritholtz Wealth Management, businessman, author
- Website: ritholtz.com

Barry Ritholtz (born 1961) is an American businessman and author. He is the founder and chief investment officer of Ritholtz Wealth Management, a financial planning and asset management firm with over $7.65 billion in assets under management. He first came to public notice for his warning about derivatives and mortgages leading to the subprime mortgage crisis.

Ritholtz is known as a contrarian who frequently pushes back against the traditional Wall Street consensus. On YahooTV, Ritholtz flipped bullish the day of the market lows in March 2009. He is also known for warning investors not to assume COVID-19 would end the bull market on April 1, 2020. In 2024, Financial Planning magazine called him the "Prickly Prophet of Wall Street".

Before founding his firm, Ritholtz was CEO of Fusion IQ. Prior to that, he was the chief market strategist at Maxim Group, an investment bank in New York.

== Education ==
Ritholtz graduated from Stony Brook University with a degree in political science and a minor in philosophy. He was a member of the school's equestrian team, and competed in the 1981 National Championships of the Intercollegiate Horse Show Association. After graduation, Ritholtz studied at Yeshiva University’s Benjamin N. Cardozo School of Law in New York, graduating cum laude in 1989 with a J.D. He passed the bar exams in New York and New Jersey. He went on to practice law for a few years.

== Media ==
He is a guest commentator on Bloomberg Television and the creator and host of the Bloomberg Podcast Masters in Business—the first mainstream, long-form interview finance investing podcast.

He is also a former contributor to CNBC and TheStreet.com.

== Writing ==
Ritholtz launched a blog on GeoCities in 1998 with insights on financial markets; he moved it to Typepad in 2003 naming it The Big Picture. The Big Picture has amassed 275 million visitors and generates half a million page views per month.

He wrote a weekly markets and investing column for Bloomberg Opinion from 2013 to 2021; from 2011 to 2017, he also wrote a personal finance and investing column for the Washington Post.

Ritholtz is the author of Bailout Nation: How Greed and Easy Money Corrupted Wall Street and Shook the World Economy, published in 2009. In a review, The New York Times wrote "The author writes with the fury of an insider mortified by the behavior of his heretical peers." He also wrote How Not To Invest: The Ideas, Numbers, and Behaviors That Destroy Wealth – and How to Avoid Them, which was published on March 18, 2025.

== Recognition ==
Ritholtz's podcast Masters in Business won the Adweek 2023 Audio Award for the Best Business-to-Business Podcast. In 2012, Ritholtz was listed as one of the “25 Most Dangerous People in Financial Media” by the Huffington Post. In 2010, Ritholtz was named one of the "15 Most Important Economic Journalists" by The Daily Beast.
