= John Wilkinson Taylor (educator) =

UNESCO director-general (1906–2001)

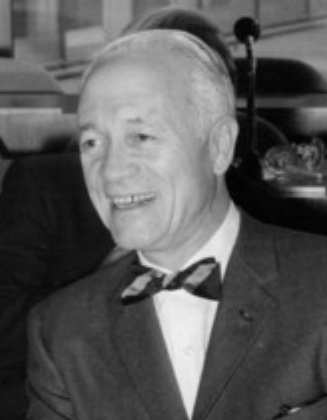
- Wilkinson Taylor in 1966
- Born: 26 September 1906; Covington, Kentucky
- Died: December 11, 2001 (aged 95); Denver, Colorado
- Occupation: educator

John Wilkinson Taylor (September 26, 1906 – December 11, 2001) was an American educator. He was President of the University of Louisville from 1947 to 1950. He served as the acting director general of UNESCO between 1952 and 1953, following the resignation of Jaime Torres Bodet. He died on 11 December 2001 at the age of 95.
