= Delinian =

UK-based information company

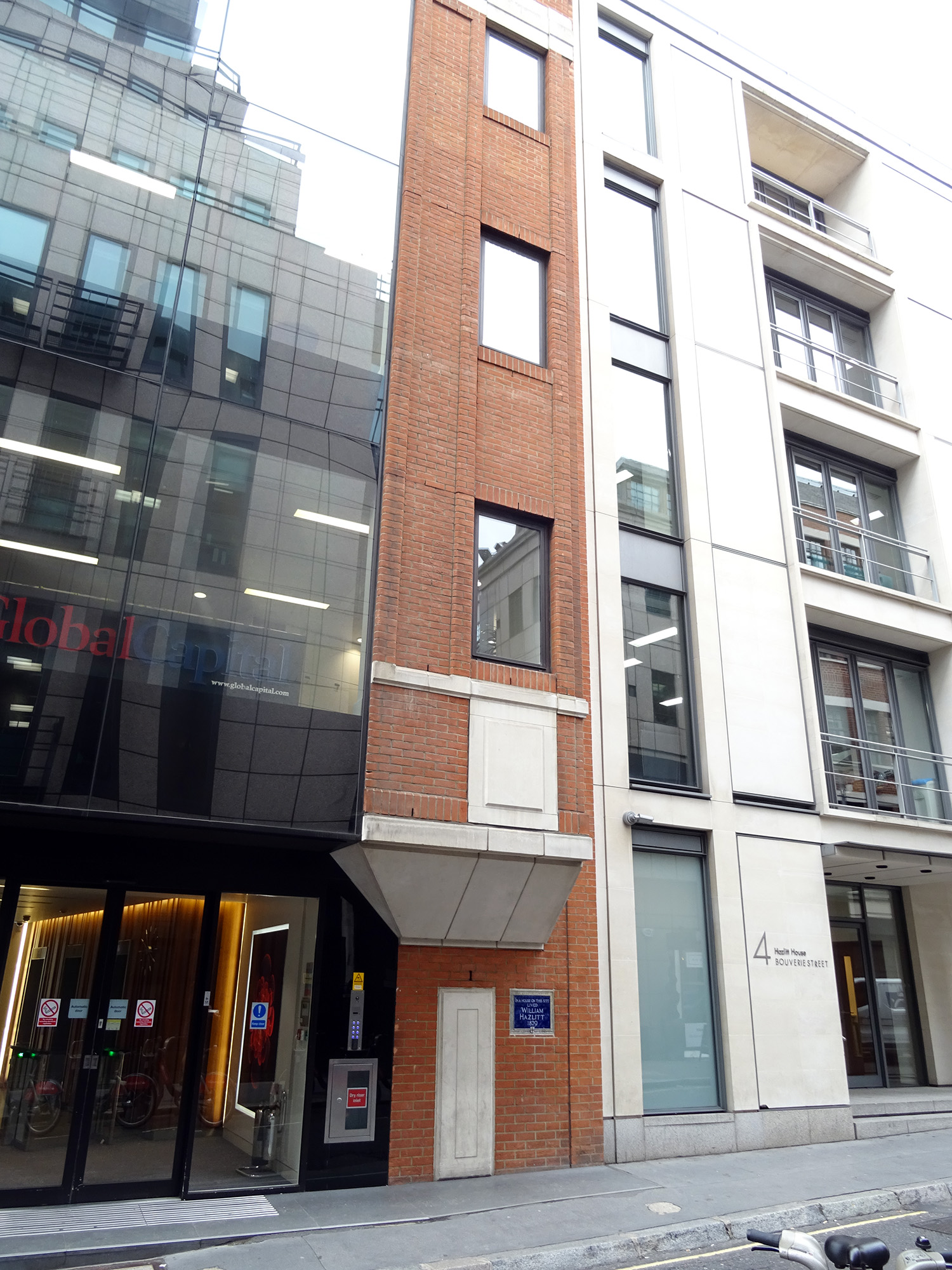
- Headquarters in London
- Formerly: Euromoney Institutional Investor PLC
- Type: Private company
- Traded as: Previously: LSE: ERM; FTSE 250 component
- Industry: B2B publishing and information
- Founded: 1969; 57 years ago
- Founder: Patrick Sergeant
- Headquarters: London, United Kingdom
- Key people: Leslie Van de Walle (Chairman); Andrew Rashbass, CEO
- Products: Media, live events, subscription services
- Revenue: ▲£336.1 million (2021)
- Operating income: ▲£31.1 million (2021)
- Net income: ▼£12.6 million (2021)
- Number of employees: 2,469 (2021)
- Website: www.euromoneyplc.com

Delinian (formerly Euromoney Institutional Investor) is a British financial media company that has interests in business and financial publishing and event organisation.

As of 2020, it was one of Europe's largest business and financial information companies. It was listed on the London Stock Exchange and was a constituent of the FTSE 250 Index until it was acquired by private equity groups, Astorg and Epiris, in November 2022.

== History ==
Euromoney magazine was founded by Patrick Sergeant in 1969 as an international business-to-business media group focused primarily on the international finance sector. The costs to launch the magazine were covered with £6,000 from Associated Newspapers and £200 from Sergeant himself and a number of other Mail employees, with Hambros Bank putting up stand-by credit. Padraic Fallon joined the magazine as editor. He would takeover as chairman and executive after Sergeant, overseeing the company until his death in 2012.

Patrick Sergeant continued to manage the business until 1985 when he became chairman. The company was first listed on the London Stock Exchange in 1986. Sergeant retired as chairman in September 1992 when he was appointed president and non-executive director, but served as a board member until May 2018.

It was formerly 49% owned by the Daily Mail and General Trust Group until the stake was spun-off in 2019.

In July 2022, the company agreed to accept a takeover offer worth £1.7 billion from private equity groups, Astorg and Epiris. The transaction was approved by the court on 22 November 2022. The company changed its name to Delinian in January 2023.

== Acquisitions ==
Acquisitions include:

- 1989 - International Tax Review (ITR)
- 1991 - Managing IP
- 1996 - Reactions magazine
- January 1999 - ISI Emerging Markets
- 2003 - Hedge Fund Intelligence
- February 2004 - Information Management Network (IMN)
- 2006 - Metal Bulletin
- 2006 - BCA Research
- October 2006 - Total Derivatives
- May 2008 - BPR Benchmark
- May 2008 - Benchmark Financials
- August 2010 - Arete Consulting
- August 2011 - Ned Davis Research Inc.
- February 2012 - Global Grain Geneva
- January 2013 - TTI/Vanguard
- March 2013 - Insider Publishing
- April 2013 - Centre for Investor Education
- April 2013 - Quantitative Techniques
- October 2013 - IJ Online
- July 2014 - Mining Indaba
- August 2016 - FastMarkets
- March 2017 - BroadMedia Communications
- June 2018 - The Deal
- June 2018 - BoardEx
- May 2021 - Relationship Science

== Portfolio ==
Euromoney's portfolio includes brands such as Euromoney, Institutional Investor, BCA Research, Ned Davis Research, Fastmarkets MB, Fastmarkets AMM, International Tax Review, International Financial Law Review (IFLR), Managing Intellectual Property (MIP), SRP, Random Lengths, EMIS, Insurance Insider, Fastmarkets RISI, Global Capital and IJGlobal.

International Tax Review (ITR) provides comprehensive coverage of international tax news and policy analysis, as well as surveys, in-depth features and unique guides to the most recent deals. The magazine has interviewed numerous politicians and economists, including Arthur Laffer, Pierre Moscovici and Margrethe Vestager. The International Financial Law Review is the "market-leading financial law publication for lawyers in financial institutions, corporates and private practice".

The company also provides training services: the London Metal Exchange announced in January 2015 that it would partner with the company to offer specialist courses.
