= List of CNBC personalities =

This is a list of current and former on-air staff of the American business news channel CNBC.

== Current on-air staff ==
Staff are based at CNBC's global headquarters in Englewood Cliffs, New Jersey, U.S., unless stated otherwise.

=== Anchors ===
- Morgan Brennan - also reports on defense, manufacturing, and aerospace
- Jim Cramer (New York)
- Sara Eisen (New York)
- Kelly Evans
- David Faber (New York)
- Jon Fortt
- Frank Holland - also covers transports
- Joe Kernen (New York)
- Melissa Lee (New York)
- Becky Quick (New York)
- Carl Quintanilla (New York)
- Andrew Ross Sorkin (New York)
- Michael Santoli (New York) - also senior markets correspondent
- Brian Sullivan - also senior national correspondent
- Scott Wapner (New York)

=== Reporters ===
- Julia Boorstin (Los Angeles) - senior media and tech correspondent
- Deirdre Bosa (San Francisco) - technology reporter
- Contessa Brewer - reports on gaming, insurance, and general news
- Megan Cassella - Washington correspondent
- Dominic Chu - senior markets commentator
- Bertha Coombs (New York) - healthcare reporter
- Sharon Epperson - senior personal finance correspondent
- Robert Frank - wealth editor
- Eamon Javers (Washington, D.C.) - senior Washington correspondent
- Steve Kovach - technology correspondent
- Phil LeBeau (Chicago) - autos and aviation reporter
- Steve Liesman - senior economics reporter
- Dan Mangan - political reporter covering the Supreme Court
- Seema Mody - global markets reporter and travel industry reporter
- Diana Olick (Washington, D.C.) - senior real estate reporter
- Kristina Partsinevelos - NASDAQ reporter, also covering semiconductors and precious metals
- Angelica Peebles - healthcare and pharmaceuticals reporter
- Leslie Picker - banking and finance reporter
- Courtney Reagan - retail reporter
- Oliver Renwick - (Chicago) options reporter
- Kate Rogers - small business and entrepreneurship reporter
- Kate Rooney - CNBC technology reporter focusing on financial technology, payments, and venture capital
- Alex Sherman - senior reporter, business of sports
- MacKenzie Sigalos (San Francisco) - technology reporter
- Pippa Stevens - markets and investing reporter
- Emily Wilkins (Washington, D.C.) - political reporter covering regulatory issues and policies

=== Notable contributors ===
- Guy Adami
- Josh Brown
- Michelle Caruso-Cabrera
- Karen Finerman
- Wilfred Frost (London)
- Herb Greenberg
- Ron Insana
- Tyler Mathisen
- Bob Pisani

== Former on-air staff ==
=== Anchors and hosts ===
- Peter Barnes (Capitol Gains; now a Washington-based bureau reporter for the Fox Business)
- Maria Bartiromo (Squawk Box, Street Signs, Market Watch, Market Wrap, Business Center, Closing Bell and On the Money with Maria Bartiromo; was a Global Markets Editor and anchor of Mornings with Maria at Fox Business until September 3, 2026)
- Louisa Bojesen (Street Signs; left CNBC Europe in April 2017)
- Gloria Borger (Capital Report; now a Senior Political Analyst for CNN)
- Erin Burnett (Squawk on the Street, Street Signs; now anchor of CNN's Erin Burnett OutFront)
- Brenda Buttner (The Money Club; business correspondent for Fox News and host of Bulls & Bears; died February 20, 2017)
- Michelle Caruso-Cabrera; (Worldwide Exchange, Power Lunch; left in September 2018)
- Neil Cavuto (Market Wrap; was host of 3 shows, Your World with Neil Cavuto and Cavuto Live on Fox News and Cavuto: Coast to Coast on Fox Business, where he was also the Senior Vice President and Managing Editor of Business News until his departure in 2024)
- Liz Claman (Morning Call, Cover to Cover, Wake Up Call, Market Watch, Today's Business, This Morning's Business, and Before the Bell; now a co-anchor at Fox Business)
- Tom Costello (Today's Business; now a correspondent for NBC News)
- Ted David (The Money Wheel, Market Wrap, Morning Call; retired in May 2008)
- Donny Deutsch (The Big Idea with Donny Deutsch; now CEO of the advertising/marketing firm Deutsch, Inc. and MSNBC contributor)
- Amanda Drury (Street Signs, Power Lunch; rejoined CNBC Asia, based in Sydney)
- Michael Eisner (Conversations with Michael Eisner)
- Wilfred Frost (Worldwide Exchange, Closing Bell; now with Sky News. He also occasionally presents Worldwide Exchange from CNBC Europe in London)
- Melissa Francis (now an anchor at Fox Business and Fox News)
- Yousef Gamal El-Din (Access: Middle East; later with Bloomberg Television based in Dubai)
- Hadley Gamble (Capital Connection, Access: Middle East, Access: Africa)
- Susie Gharib (Today's Business; formerly a co-anchor for the Nightly Business Report on PBS, produced by CNBC until its end in December 2019; now working at Fortune magazine)
- Bill Griffeth (Nightly Business Report, Closing Bell, Power Lunch, retired in December 2019)
- Charles Grodin (The Charles Grodin Show; subsequently a commentator for the CBS News Radio before passing.)
- Mark Haines (Squawk Box, Squawk on the Street; died May 24, 2011)
- Richard Hart (CNET News.com; no longer active in the cable news industry)
- Sue Herera (Market Wrap, Business Tonight, The Money Wheel, Business Center, and Power Lunch; retired from day-to-day broadcasting in February 2021)
- Simon Hobbs (Squawk on the Street; left in July 2016.)
- Nicolas Hulot (now a French environmentalist and is no longer active in the cable news industry)
- Gregg Jarrett (Inside America's Courts; now an anchor at Fox News)
- Terry Keenan (The Money Wheel and Market Wrap; left Fox News in September 2009, died October 23, 2014)
- Larry Kudlow (Kudlow & Cramer, The Kudlow Report; left CNBC to become Director of the National Economic Council, now with Fox Business)
- Nicole Lapin (Worldwide Exchange; left CNBC in August 2011)
- Janice Lieberman, (Steals and Deals)
- Martha MacCallum (Morning Call; now co-anchor of America's Newsroom on Fox News)
- Consuelo Mack (Market Watch, Morning Call, The Wall Street Journal Report, WealthTrack)
- Boyd Matson (National Geographic Explorer; now host of Wild Chronicles on PBS)
- Chris Matthews (The Chris Matthews Show; later host of Hardball with Chris Matthews on MSNBC)
- Kevin McCullough (The Money Wheel)
- John McEnroe (McEnroe; now a tennis commentator)
- Dennis Miller (Dennis Miller; now a Fox News Channel contributor and talk radio show host)
- Bob O'Brien (former stocks editor; now working at Barron's Magazine)
- Suze Orman (The Suze Orman Show; left CNBC to develop a new series, Suze Orman's Money Wars, for Warner Bros. Telepictures Productions)
- Dylan Ratigan (Closing Bell and Fast Money; left sister channel MSNBC in 2012; no longer active in the television industry)
- Trish Regan (The Call; later an anchor at Fox Business until 2020)
- Geraldo Rivera (Rivera Live and Upfront Tonight; later host of his own show, Geraldo at Large on Fox News; now with NewsNation)
- Louis Rukeyser (Louis Rukeyser's Wall Street; died in 2006)
- Tim Russert (Tim Russert; died in 2008)
- John Seigenthaler (The News on CNBC; was at Al Jazeera America until its demise on April 12, 2016)
- Bob Sellers (Today's Business, Market Watch; later at WZTV (Fox) in Nashville, TN and also, a talent agent for MediaStars Worldwide; now with NewsMax TV)
- Shepard Smith (New York) (The News with Shepard Smith left CNBC in November 2022)
- John Stehr (The Money Wheel; now primary anchor at WTHR in Indianapolis, Indiana)
- Felicia Taylor (Before the Bell, The Money Wheel, and This Morning's Business; formerly a business correspondent for CNN, was with the Retirement Living TV network until its demise on December 31, 2017)
- Brian Williams (The News with Brian Williams; was anchor of the weeknight editions of the NBC Nightly News from 2004 to 2015, rejoined MSNBC in August 2015)

=== Reporters and others ===
- Kate Bohner (no longer active in the cable news industry)
- Pat Bolland (now an anchor at BNN in Canada)
- Eric Bolling (former panelist on Fast Money; later host of The Five on Fox News until 2017; was most recently with NewsMax TV until 2024)
- Margaret Brennan (later joined to Bloomberg Television and now an anchor and moderator of Face the Nation at CBS News)
- Bay Buchanan (now a political commentator for CNN's The Situation Room)
- Allan Chernoff (now senior correspondent at CNN)
- Alina Cho (now a New York City-based bureau reporter for CNN)
- Don Dahler (now a correspondent for CBS News)
- Jackie DeAngelis (now an anchor for Yahoo Finance, and a reporter for Fox Business)
- Diane Dimond (now a co-host for the "TalkItOver" radio program)
- Phil Donahue (died in 2024)
- Dan Dorfman (was a columnist for the New York Sun until its September 2008 demise; died June 16, 2012)
- Morton Downey Jr. (died in 2001)
- Charles Gasparino (now with Fox Business)
- Garrett Glaser (retired from broadcasting and started his own firm, Glaser Media, in 2007)
- Alexis Glick (later joined Fox Business and no longer in the cable news industry)
- Bianna Golodryga (later a business correspondent for CBS News; now with CNN International)
- Amanda Grove (later with Court TV)
- Nanette Hansen (now a realtor in Long Island, New York; no longer active in the cable news industry)
- John Harwood (later with CNN)
- Kathleen Hays (now an anchor at Bloomberg Television)
- Rebecca Jarvis (now working as anchor and correspondent for ABC News)
- Kate Kelly
- John "Bradshaw" Layfield (former professional wrestler for the WWE and a business contributor for Fox News, which he rejoined in 2005 after he was fired from CNBC in 2004; he is also a color commentator for WWE Raw and WWE SmackDown)
- Susan Li (now reporter at Fox Business)
- John McLaughlin (died August 16, 2016)
- John Murphy (died in 2026)
- Dee Dee Myers (former White House Press Secretary; later a political commentator for MSNBC)
- Nishant Pant (founder of; Contributing writer to CNBC Pro, Options Trading)
- Jim Paymar (now anchor/executive producer of the Long Island Business Report at WLIW)
- Hampton Pearson (retired in June 2018)
- Rob Reynolds (now a correspondent for Al Jazeera English)
- Al Roker (now weatherman for the Today show on NBC)
- Carol Roth (Closing Bell, host of The Noon Show on WGN Radio)
- Darren Rovell (later with ESPN & ABC News; now with The Action Network)
- Rick Santelli (Chicago) (retired from CNBC on 2 October 2026)
- John W. Schoen (now Data Editor for CNBC Digital.)
- Bill Seidman (chief commentator for CNBC; died in 2009)
- Rahel Solomon (now with CNN)
- Tom Snyder (died in 2007)
- Kayla Tausche (later with CNN)
  - Jane Wells
- Erinn Westbrook (now pursuing a career as an actress)
- Joe Witte (later a weekend weather meteorologist at WJLA-TV (ABC) in Washington, D.C.; now with the Goddard Space Flight Center)
- William (Bill) Wolman (most recently with Bloomberg BusinessWeek magazine; died in 2011)
- Carmen Rita Wong (On the Money; was most recently a radio host for Marketplace Radio on American Public Media until January 31, 2014.)
