= List of programs broadcast by CNBC =

The CNBC logo since 2025

This is a list of programs broadcast by CNBC. CNBC is an American basic cable, internet and business news television channel owned by Versant and previously owned by NBCUniversal News Group, a division of NBCUniversal, which is owned by Comcast. It was originally established on April 17, 1989 by a joint venture of NBC and Cablevision as the Consumer News and Business Channel.

== Current programming ==
=== Weekday programs ===
- Closing Bell
- Fast Money
- Mad Money
- Money Movers
- Power Lunch
- Squawk Box
- Squawk Box Europe (final hour only)
- Squawk on the Street
- The Exchange
- Worldwide Exchange

=== Primetime programs ===
- American Greed
- Jay Leno's Garage
- Money Court
- No Retreat: Business Bootcamp

== Former programming ==
=== Weekday programs ===
- America Now
- Before the Bell
- Bull Session
- Bullseye
- Business Center
- Business Insiders
- Business Tonight
- The Call
- Capitol Gains
- CNBC Sports
- The Edge
- Kudlow & Company
- Kudlow & Cramer
- Last Call
- Market Watch: is a show on CNBC that aired from 10am to 12 noon ET since 19 January 1998, hosted by Felicia Taylor and Ted David (for the first hour). and Bob Sellers and Consuelo Mack (for the second hour). It was replaced by Midday Call on 4 February 2002 The show gave viewers the latest business news during the morning trading session. Regular segments included Taking Stock, where viewers could phone-in and ask the guest analysts' recommendations on certain stocks.
- Market Wrap
- On the Money
- The Money Club
- The Money Wheel
- Morning Call
- NBC Nightly News
- TechCheck
- The News with Brian Williams
- The News with Shepard Smith
- Squawk Alley
- Steals and Deals
- Street Signs
- Today's Business
- Wake Up Call

=== Primetime programs ===
- Adventure Capitalists (2016–17)
- American Greed: Biggest Cons (2020)
- Back in the Game (2019)
- Billion Dollar Buyer (2016–18)
- Blue Collar Millionaires (2015–17)
- The Car Chasers (2013–15)
- Cash Pad (2019)
- Cleveland Hustles (2016)
- Consumed: The Real Restaurant Business (2015)
- Crowd Rules (2013)
- Deadly Rich (2018–19)
- Deal or No Deal (2018–19)
- The Deed (2017–18)
- The Deed: Chicago (2017–20)
- Empires of New York (2020)
- Fast Money MBA Challenge (2007)
- The Filthy Rich Guide (2014–17)
- Five Day Biz Fix (2019–20)
- Follow the Leader (2016)
- The Job Interview (2017)
- Listing Impossible (2020)
- Make Me a Millionaire Inventor (2015–16)
- Money Talks (2014)
- The Partner (2017)
- The Profit (2013–21)
- Restaurant Startup (2014–16)
- Secret Lives of the Super Rich (2013–19)
- Staten Island Hustle (2018)
- Streets of Dreams with Marcus Lemonis (2021)
- Super Heists (2021)
- Treasure Detectives (2013)
- West Texas Investors Club (2015–16)
