= Today's Business =

- Today's Business logo (2000–2002)
- Presented by: Bob Sellers; Liz Claman; Tom Costello; Sydnie Kohara; Felicia Taylor; Susie Gharib; Bonnie Behrand (Today's Business: Early Edition)
- Country of origin: United States
- Original language: English

Production
- Running time: 120 minutes

Original release
- Network: CNBC
- Release: 1994 – February 1, 2002

Related
- Wake Up Call

Today's Business is an American business news television program that aired on CNBC in the early morning, 5–7 am ET timeslot, hosted for the end of its run by Liz Claman and Bob Sellers. In January 2002, New York Post mentions producers are taking away this programme with expanded hour. Finally, it was replaced by Wake Up Call on Feb 4, 2002. The show covered news that was expect to affect the stock market trading day ahead and overnight business news in Asia. It listed as CNBC’s second most-watched program.

== Today's Business anchors ==
- Felicia Taylor and Susie Gharib (1994(?)-1998(?))
- Bob Sellers and Bonnie Behrand (Today's Business: Early Edition, 1999)
- Tom Costello and Sydnie Kohara (1999)
- Bob Sellers and Liz Claman (2000–2002)

== Today's Business: Early Edition ==
In 1999, Today's Business: Early Edition was added on weekdays from 5–6 am ET on CNBC. It was hosted by Bob Sellers and Bonnie Behrand, which expanded the whole Today's Business block to 3 hours.

Today's Business: Early Edition provided frequent round-ups of key business and general news stories, along with sports updates. Regular segments included "Wake Up with Jay", highlights from Jay Leno's Tonight Show monologue, and live weather reports from Chief Meteorologist Joe Witte.

== CNBC Europe edition ==
A business news television program also titled Today's Business aired on CNBC Europe from 6–7 am CET (5–6 am WET) between January 2001 and March 2007. It was originally based on the CNBC U.S. morning version of Today's Business.

The European Today's Business was presented by Steve Sedgwick from 2006 through the end of the program's run in 2007. Earlier presenters of the program were Simon Hobbs (2001–2003), Serena Al-Awa (2003), and Guy Johnson (2003–2006). The executive producer of morning programming is Harry Fuller.

Segments on the program included a review of the previous day's business, a news headlines round-up, as well as early results from the market. The program also linked up with CNBC Asia for continuing coverage of the Asian session.

The program was renamed from Today's Business Europe in May 2003. While the title was only slightly altered, the program was reduced from two hours to one (with the then-titled CNBC Europe Squawk Box gaining an hour). While Today's Business Europe had been presented in front of CNBC Europe's video wall, the new program, initially co-anchored by Guy Johnson and Serena Al-Awa, was presented from behind a desk.

The program ended its run on March 23, 2007 and was replaced on March 26, 2007 by a new show, Capital Connection, co-anchored by Maura Fogarty at CNBC Asia in Singapore and Sedgwick in London.

== Worldwide Today's Business ==
Around CNBC's global branches, there are many counterparts of Today's Business in the world:

Channel	Program	Still Run?	Replacement
CNBC Asia	CNBC Today	(2000-04-03—2002-03-15)	Asia Wake Up Call
CNBC Europe	Today's Business Europe	(2001-01-15—2007-03-23)	Capital Connection
Class CNBC	Caffè Affari	(?—present)	N/A
CNBC Africa	Business AM	(2007-06-04—present)	N/A
