= The Money Wheel =

American television program

- Country of origin: United States
- Original language: English

Original release
- Network: CNBC
- Release: April 17, 1989 – January 16, 1998

The Money Wheel is a business news television program aired on weekdays on the CNBC network from its inception in 1989 until 1998. Initially, The Money Wheel covered almost all of the channel's business day hours, airing continuously from 8:30 a.m. to 5:30 p.m. ET each day. The show's hours were later cut back to 10 a.m. to 12 noon and 2 to 3 p.m. ET as other programs were introduced to the schedule. The show gave viewers the latest market action on Wall Street as the trading day progressed.

The Money Wheel was hosted by many anchors of CNBC, including Ted David, Felicia Taylor, Bill Griffeth, Sue Herera, Ron Insana, Terry Keenan, John Stehr and Kevin McCullough.

Regular segments included Taking Stock where viewers could phone-in and ask the guest analysts' recommendations on certain stocks.

As a result of CNBC's alliance with Dow Jones, the show was renamed Market Watch in the morning and was replaced by an extended Street Signs in the afternoon. At the time, most segments remained the same.

== International Editions ==
CNBC's two main international channels, CNBC Europe and CNBC Asia, aired regional versions of the programme to give viewers live coverage of regional markets.
