= Cover to Cover =

Cover to Cover may refer to:

- Cover to Cover (1965 TV program), an American television program, featuring excerpts from outstanding children's books, that was broadcast on PBS from 1965 to 1996
- Cover to Cover (2005 TV program), an American television program hosted by Liz Claiman that was broadcast on the business channel CNBC
- Cover to Cover, an American daytime television program that aired on NBC in 1991
- Cover to Cover (Morse, Portnoy and George album), 2006
- Cover to Cover (The Jeff Healey Band album), 1995
- Cover to Cover tour, a 1991 tour by George Michael
- Cover to Cover, a British audiobook publisher that was a predecessor of BBC Audiobooks
