= Young Darth Vader =

Young Darth Vader may refer to:

- Anakin Skywalker
- The Force (advertisement), a 2011 television advertisement for Volkswagen's Passat
