= The Capitol Connection =

The Capitol Connection or Capitol Connection may refer to:

- The Capitol Connection, a radio show on New York politics produced by WAMC
- The Capitol Connection, a television studio operated by George Mason University
- Capital Connection (TV programme)
- Capital Connection (New Zealand train service)
