= Matt Quayle =

American producer

Matt Quayle is the Co-Creator and Executive Producer of Squawk Box & Squawk on the Street on CNBC-TV. He also serves as the Senior Advisor to CNBC's international morning program Worldwide Exchange. He was named to the TJFR Business News Reporter “30 under 30” list in 1997, 1998 & 1999.

Quayle was also Senior Producer of Kudlow & Cramer for two years between 2003 and 2005 while at the same time also acting as a Senior Producer of Bullseye with Dylan Ratigan.

He holds a BA in Communications from Rutgers University and is currently working on his MA in Media and Professional Communications at Fairleigh Dickinson University.

Quayle lives in New Jersey with his wife (CNBC anchor Rebecca Quick), their children (son Kyle Nathaniel, and daughter Kaylie Noelle), and his two daughters (Natalie and Kimiko).
