= Shepard Smith =

American news anchor (born 1964)

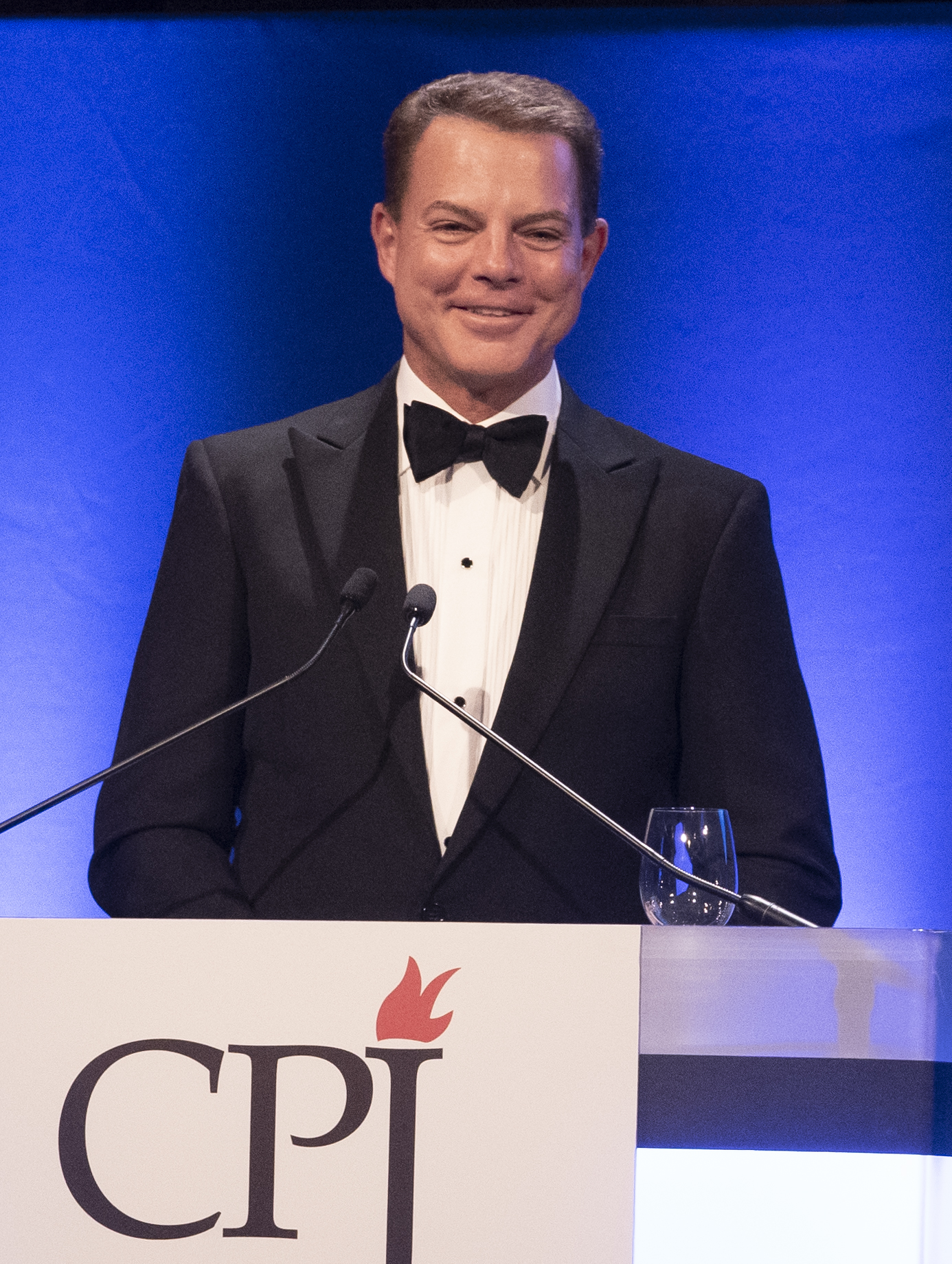
- Smith in 2019
- Born: David Shepard Smith Jr. January 14, 1964 (age 62); Holly Springs, Mississippi, U.S.
- Education: University of Mississippi
- Occupation: News anchor
- Years active: 1996–2022
- Employers: Fox News (1996–2019); CNBC (2020–2022)
- Notable credits: Studio B; The Fox Report; Shepard Smith Reporting; The News with Shepard Smith
- Spouse: Virginia Donald (m. 1987; div. 1993)
- Partner: Giovanni Graziano (2012–present)

David Shepard Smith Jr. (born January 14, 1964) is an American retired broadcast journalist. He served as chief general news anchor and host of The News with Shepard Smith on CNBC, a daily evening newscast launched in late September 2020; but his program was canceled in November 2022. Smith is best known for his 23-year career at the Fox News Channel, which he joined at its 1996 inception and where he served as chief anchor and managing editor of the breaking news division. Smith hosted several programs in his tenure at Fox, including Fox Report, Studio B and Shepard Smith Reporting.

== Early life and education ==
David Shepard Smith Jr. was born in Holly Springs, Mississippi, the son of Dora Ellen Anderson, an English teacher, and David Shepard Smith Sr., a cotton merchant. He attended Marshall Academy in Holly Springs. After high school, his parents separated and he moved to Florida with his mother. He studied journalism at the University of Mississippi, where he left two credits shy of a degree to take a reporter job in Panama City, Florida. Smith delivered the university's 155th commencement address on May 10, 2008.

== Career ==
=== Beginnings ===
Smith began his career in television with WCJB-TV in Gainesville, Florida, and then with WJHG-TV in Panama City Beach, Florida. After reporting jobs at WBBH-TV in Fort Myers, WSVN in Miami and WCPX-TV (now WKMG-TV) in Orlando, Smith became a correspondent for A Current Affair.

=== Fox News ===
After working as a correspondent for Fox affiliate service News Edge, Smith joined Fox News Channel at its inception in 1996. At Fox News, Smith reported on the death of Diana, Princess of Wales in 1997, President Bill Clinton's 1998 impeachment trial, the 1999 Columbine High School massacre, the 2001 execution of Oklahoma City bomber Timothy McVeigh, Hurricane Katrina in 2005 and the death of Michael Jackson in 2009.

In 2003, The Fox Report with Shepard Smith was ranked third among the top five U.S. cable news programs, and Smith tied for second with Dan Rather and Peter Jennings as the most-trusted news anchor on both network and cable news. On November 19, 2007, Smith signed a three-year contract for $7–$8 million per year. He renewed his contract with Fox on October 26, 2010, for another three years. On September 12, 2013, he became managing editor of Fox News breaking news division and the host of Shepard Smith Reporting.

In September 2012, while covering live helicopter video of an Arizona police chase of a man after a carjacking, the man shot himself live while Smith was narrating. After a commercial break Smith apologized and told the audience that it was "due to human error". Fox would later be sued for the incident by the man's wife after her children saw the video.

In November 2017, Smith infuriated some Fox viewers when he countered the Uranium One conspiracy theory, which claims that the Obama administration intervened corruptly in a deal allowing a Russian company to buy Uranium One, a Canadian company with uranium mining interests in the US, in exchange for donations to the Clinton Foundation. Smith's reporting put him at odds with colleague and Fox prime time host Sean Hannity, who had supported the claim against Hillary Clinton.

On March 15, 2018, Fox News signed Smith to a multi-year contract. On October 11, 2019, he announced on Shepard Smith Reporting that he was leaving the network. In a 2021 interview with Christiane Amanpour on her eponymous show on CNN, he stated that his presence on Fox had become "untenable" due to what he claimed were "falsehoods" and "lies" intentionally spread on the network's shows.

=== CNBC ===
On July 8, 2020, the business and economic news network CNBC announced Smith would join the network as chief general news anchor and chief general breaking news anchor. Smith served as the host of The News with Shepard Smith, a primetime general news program that aired weekdays at 7:00 pm. ET and launched on September 30, 2020. According to a CNBC press release, the program "[aims] to go beyond financial markets, 'to tell rich, deeply reported stories across the entire landscape of global news.'" CNBC had previously aired a similarly named program in the same time slot, hosted by Brian Williams and later John Seigenthaler, from 2002 to 2004. His program was canceled in November 2022 and he left CNBC that month.

=== Post-Fox career ===
In a speech to the International Press Freedom Awards on November 21, 2019, Smith warned of authoritarian governments that make it dangerous and difficult for journalists to do their jobs, saying autocrats have learned to use online tools and social media to shore up their power. At the event, Smith gave $500,000 to the host organization, the Committee to Protect Journalists.

=== Appearances in film ===
Smith appeared as himself in the 1997 film Volcano. Video of Smith anchoring on Fox during the opening moments of the March 2003 Iraq War was used in the film Fahrenheit 9/11. Additionally, archive video of Smith anchoring Shepard Smith Reporting covering the 2016 US presidential election was used in the 2019 docudrama Bombshell.

== Personal life ==
Smith married Virginia Donald, a University of Mississippi classmate, in 1987. They divorced in 1993 with no children. In 2017, Smith publicly announced he is gay and has a long-time boyfriend. In a speech at the University of Mississippi, Smith would say, "...it wasn't until seven, or eight, or nine years ago, I started living my truth ... And when I told the truth, I guess it was considered that I outed myself. I didn't even think about it because I didn't think I was in."

== See also ==
- List of LGBT people from New York City
- New Yorkers in journalism
