= The Force (advertisement) =

Television advertisement

- Agency: Deutsch
- Client: Volkswagen
- Language: English
- Running time: 1:02
- Product: Volkswagen Passat
- Release date: February 6, 2011
- Music by: John Williams
- Starring: Max Page, Kovar McClure
- Production company: Lucasfilm
- Country: United States

The Force is a television advertisement created by Deutsch Inc. to promote Volkswagen's Passat.

== Commercial ==
Volkswagen had not aired a commercial during the Super Bowl in more than 10 years. In 2011, the company ran two ads, both from advertising agency Deutsch. The other was called "Black Beetle".

The advertisement for the 2012 Volkswagen Passat features a young boy (played by Max Page) in full Darth Vader regalia attempting to use the Force to start a washing machine and a clothes dryer, and to wake the dog and a doll. After he is unsuccessful in those attempts, he is startled to discover that he can start the car, though his father does it using a remote control.

The film was directed by Lance Acord and produced by Park Pictures featuring the musical track "Imperial March" composed by John Williams.

== Actors ==
Max Page had never seen any of the Star Wars films, saying he was too scared. He met James Earl Jones, the voice of Vader in the Star Wars films, in New York City on 7 February. On 24 May, Page appeared in costume, with the Star Wars Darth Vader music playing, at the inauguration of the Volkswagen Chattanooga Assembly Plant.

== Reception ==
The Passat ad appeared on YouTube the week before its TV debut on 6 February 2011. By the next morning, the video had received one million views; the number reached 8 million before the commercial aired on TV. Considered by everyone connected with the ad to be the best version but "too long to play during the game", the online version lasted sixty seconds, compared to thirty in the broadcast version, and the long version stood out more in people's minds. As of February 7, the video had more than 15 million views. Page's mother, Jennifer, said the reaction was "overwhelming [...] I can't even keep up with the messages and the calls."

James Rainey of the Los Angeles Times said the ad "will get inside people's heads and stay there because it combines the iconic 'Star Wars' character and a classic sentiment—a child's desire to be larger than life." Of all the Super Bowl ads, Rainey said, "the one you'll actually want to see again is Volkswagen's, powered by the force of a tiny Darth Vader who tells a simple story, with a little body language and nary a word."

Stuart Elliott of The New York Times enjoyed the ad, calling it a "loving spot-on tribute to Star Wars." CNBC's Phil LeBeau said that the commercial was "clever, original" and "left a strong lasting impression." According to USA Today the commercial was posted online 5 days before the Super Bowl and had already garnered 13 million views by the time the game aired. It also scored number 3 on the USA Today Ad Meter.

On 23 May, the Passat ad won an online competition on the CBS special Clash of the Commercials: USA vs. the World, in which people were asked to "choose the greatest commercial of all time." The second-place finisher was Heineken's "Walk-in Fridge".

By the end of 2011, Advertising Age said, "With 600 placements, the video is on pace to become one of the most-watched viral ads of all time." In its first year the ad had over 49.4 million views. The video was also the most shared ad of all time as of 2013.

As of August 2014, the Passat ad had 5,254,667 shares on social media when it was surpassed after 41 months as the most shared ad by "La La La (Brazil 2014)" for Activia. It remained in second place and was still the most viewed Super Bowl ad as of January 2015, when it had 61 million views.

The success of the Passat ad is considered to have changed how Super Bowl advertising is viewed. Instead of a single ad, businesses look at an entire campaign which involves previews before the game and the use of social media.
