= On the Money (1970 TV program) =

American television program

- Also known as: The Wall Street Journal Report
- Genre: Sunday morning talk show
- Presented by: Rebecca Quick
- Country of origin: United States
- Original language: English

Production
- Production company: CNBC

Original release
- Release: September 4, 1970 – December 28, 2019

On the Money, formerly The Wall Street Journal Report, is an American syndicated weekly television program airing on weekends, and on Sunday evenings on CNBC. The program is hosted by Becky Quick. Political, business, and economic figures are interviewed on the program; guests have included Henry Paulson and Colin Powell.

== History ==
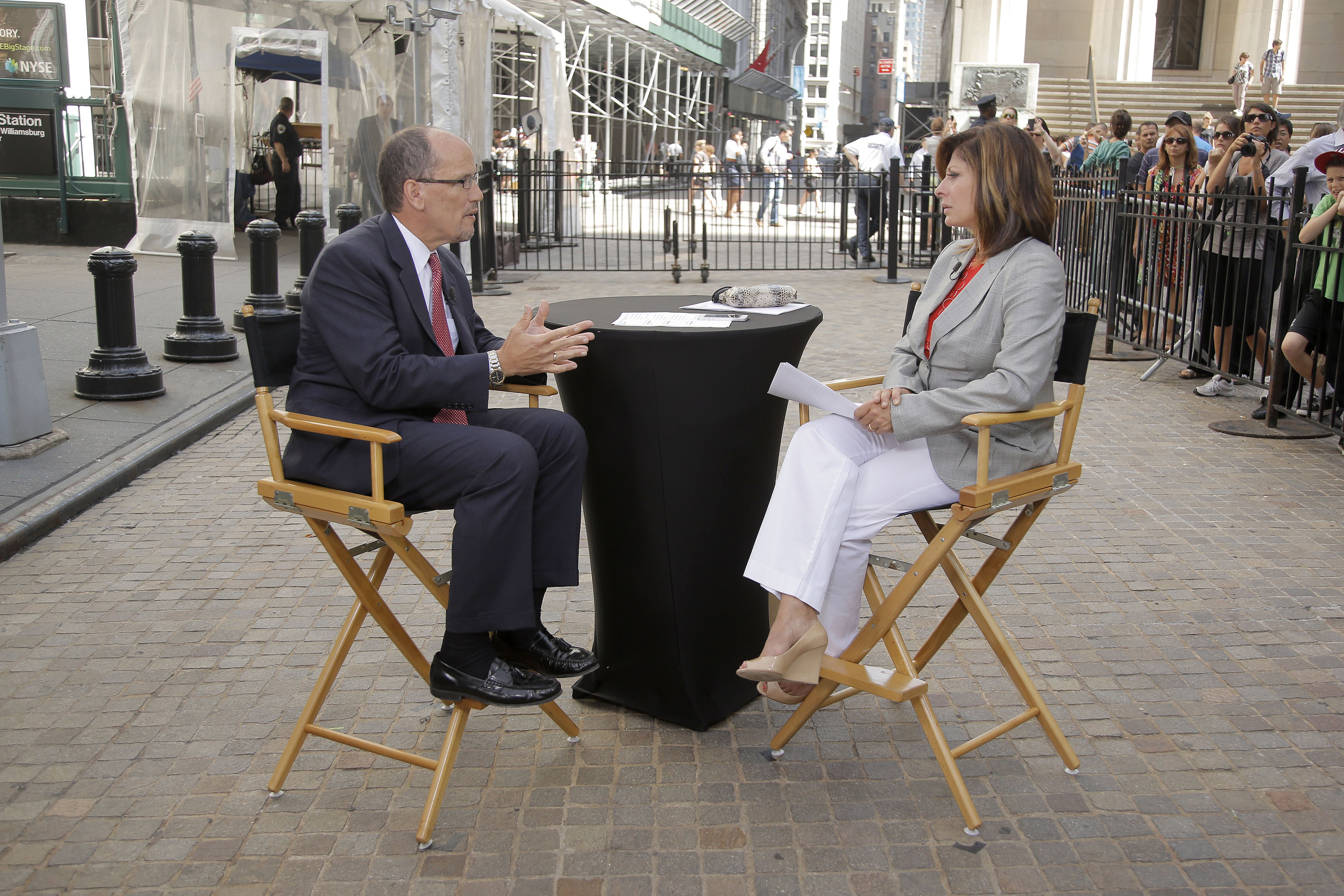
Maria Bartiromo interviewing Labor Secretary Tom Perez in 2013

The Wall Street Journal Report premiered on September 4, 1970 on various stations. It was also concurrently launched as a radio show, under the title The Wall Street Journal Business Report. The program spawned dozens of local editions, such as WGN-TV in Chicago, then in 1982, it became a completely national program, in association with WPIX in New York City, where it remained until three years. In 1987, Consuelo Mack became a regular anchor of its show, where it remained until fall 2004.

Maria Bartiromo joined the program in September 2004, replacing Consuelo Mack as its host. The program features interviews, discussions, weekly job reports, stock market updates, and stories about the economy. The program was renamed On the Money with Maria Bartiromo from the January 6, 2013 broadcast with the end of CNBC's content agreement with the Wall Street Journal owner Dow Jones & Company, which was purchased by News Corporation (owners of CNBC's competitor Fox Business Network) in 2007; On the Money had previously been the title of a daily program on CNBC from 2005 to 2009. Bartiromo left CNBC on November 22, 2013, moving to Fox Business Network and making that weekend's On the Money her last. The program was subsequently re-titled On the Money and since then has been hosted by CNBC's Becky Quick, who also appears on Squawk Box. The show ended production in December 2019 along with Nightly Business Report.
