= Yousef Gamal El-Din =

Egyptian-Swiss news anchor

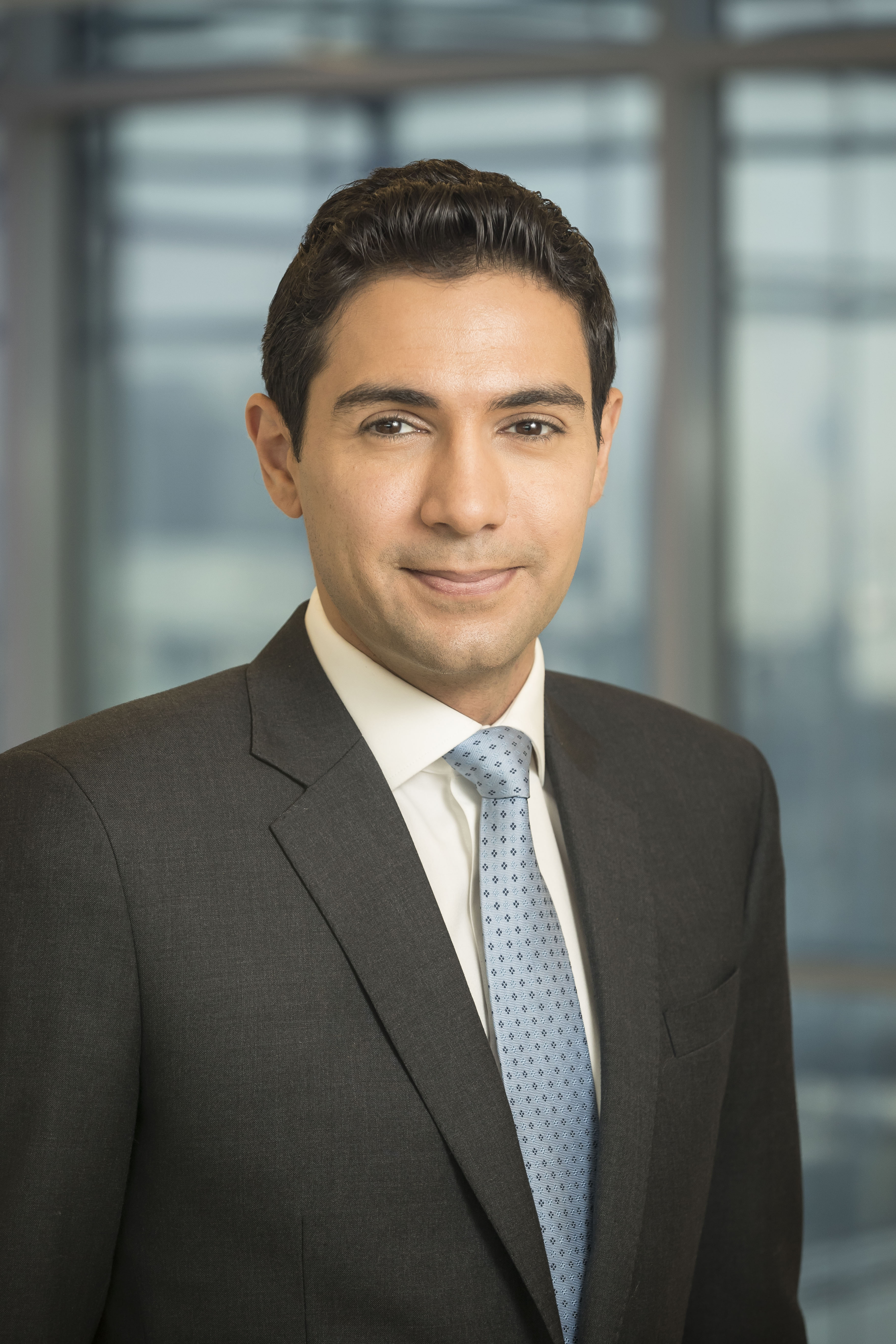
- Born: October 15, 1985 (age 40)
- Education: American University in Cairo, B.A., 2007; American University in Cairo, M.A., 2009
- Occupations: Broadcast journalist, news anchor
- Notable credit(s): CNBC Access: Middle East host (2012-2015); CNBC Capital Connection co-host (2010-2011); Bloomberg Bloomberg Markets: Middle East host (2016-2024)
- Website: http://www.yousefgamaleldin.com/

Yousef Gamal El-Din (Arabic: يوسف جمال الدين) (born October 15, 1985) is an Egyptian-Swiss conference moderator, entrepreneur, author and former news anchor. From 2016 to 2024, he was the host of Bloomberg Television's Bloomberg Daybreak : Middle East. Previously he worked for CNBC, gaining global TV recognition as the host of CNBC's Access: Middle East and the channel's regional correspondent, based in Dubai. Gamal El-Din was also a co-host of CNBC's Capital Connection from the network's Middle East studios in Bahrain.

== Biography ==
Gamal El-Din graduated from the American University in Cairo, summa cum laude, in 2007, majoring in Journalism and Mass Communication. He went on to receive a Master of Arts degree in the same field. In addition to outstanding academic achievement, he was awarded the prestigious Ahmed H. Zewail Prize for Excellence in the Sciences and Humanities. Gamal El-Din describes himself as a 'car enthusiast' on his Twitter page and used to be seen frequently at the Bahrain International Circuit.

== Career ==
After a short off-screen stint with OTV as a scriptwriter, Yousef Gamal El-Din joined Nile TV as an English presenter and reporter in July 2007. He made his debut on the "Top Stories" on July 17, 2007, and thereafter anchored the news regularly at the top of the hour live from Cairo. He reported on major events across Egypt and interviewed a wide range of prominent ministers, activists and experts. He also covered Wikimania 2008 and interviewed Jimmy Wales for Egyptian Television. In July 2008, he took charge of the bi-weekly political program the News Hour. Later in September, Gamal El-Din began hosting the new Business World show. He also made occasional appearances on Yas3ad Saba7ak on Channel 2.

=== CNBC ===
Gamal El-Din joined CNBC in June 2010 as the first anchor based at the channel's newly opened Bahrain bureau, which is operated under the auspices of CNBC Europe. On June 14, 2010, he became the third co-host of Capital Connection, joining Anna Edwards in London and Chloe Cho in Singapore. To this day he remains one of the youngest talents to have joined in the network's history.

During the 2011 Egyptian Revolution, CNBC added extensive coverage of the turmoil and violence. Yousef Gamal El-Din, reporting live for the network and MSNBC during the height of the protests in Tahrir Square, was heard "urging protesters to leave him alone so that he could report". Anchors urged him to "stay safe" only minutes after the Battle of the Camel broke out. CNBC has described him as reporting under "the toughest of circumstances".

Gamal El-Din returned to Cairo several times since the beginning of the revolution to cover protests, and interviewed the Egyptian Interim Prime Minister Essam Sharaf only hours before July 8 “Friday of Determination” demonstration. He also reported on the Bahraini uprising, the 2011 Jordanian protests and the 2011 Turkish general election

On July 4, 2012, Gamal El-Din debuted Access: Middle East, a primetime series giving key insights on regional economic and business developments. The show has featured several billionaires, including Güler Sabancı

Outside of day-to-day programming, Gamal El-Din is frequently at key summits of the World Economic Forum and has moderated sessions at events such as the Abu Dhabi Media Summit and the DIFC Forum.

=== Post-CNBC ===
On March 10, 2015, Gamal El-Din announced his resignation via Twitter, deciding to "pursue new opportunities" after five years at CNBC, without elaborating further. Almost six months later, on August 2, 2015, he announced the launch of "Medialitera", an executive media consultancy based out of Dubai.

=== Bloomberg ===
After joining Bloomberg Television in 2016, Gamal El-Din launched the new flagship show Daybreak Middle East from the network's DIFC studio in Dubai – effectively doubling regional output. Guests have included the IMF's Christine Lagarde and U.S. Treasury Secretary Steven Mnuchin.

On March 15, 2023, Gamal El-Din interviewed the Chairman of Saudi National Bank in Riyadh, where comments were made that shook global financial markets. “The answer is absolutely not, for many reasons outside the simplest reason, which is regulatory and statutory,” Following the statement, the Swiss authorities moved in with a historic rescue of Credit Suisse.

In February 2024, Gamal El-Din announced he was leaving the network and promised updates "very soon".

== Podcast ==
In February 2025, he launched a Podcast called “You’re in Business” which is available on YouTube, Spotify and Apple Podcast.

== Awards and Popular Culture ==
- The Future of Egyptian Television, Enigma Magazine, October 2008

== Bibliography ==
- Gamal El-Din, Yousef (2015). The Art of Executive Appearance: 5 Simple Ways to Look Great, Gain Confidence, and Inspire a Global Television Audience. ASIN B019978QBY.
