= Philip J. LeBeau =

Phil LeBeau is a reporter for CNBC. He started out at Lyons Township High School's WLTL radio station. At CNBC he reports on the automotive sector and airline industry. He is based at the network's Chicago bureau and edits the "Behind the Wheel" section on CNBC's website. He has also hosted documentaries on the channel including Dreamliner: Inside the World's Most Anticipated Airplane, Ford: Rebuilding an American Icon, and Saving General Motors.

LeBeau graduated from the University of Missouri's Columbia School of Journalism with a bachelor's degree in journalism and broadcasting. Before joining CNBC he was a media relations specialist for Van Kampen Funds. He was also a general reporter at KCNC-TV in Denver and KAKE-TV in Wichita, Kansas. His television career began as field producer on consumer stories at WCCO-TV in Minneapolis, Minnesota.

== See also ==
- List of CNBC personalities
