= John Stehr =

American journalist

Mayor of Zionsville, Indiana
- Incumbent
- Assumed office January 1, 2024
- Preceded by: Emily Styron

Personal details
- Born: August 20, 1958 (age 68) Pittsburgh, Pennsylvania, U.S.
- Party: Republican
- Education: Gannon University (BA)

John Stehr (born August 20, 1958, in Pittsburgh, Pennsylvania) is a former American television journalist. He is currently Mayor of Zionsville, Indiana. Stehr won the Republican party nomination in the primary election on May 2, 2023, and ran unopposed in the general election, winning on November 7, 2023. He took office as Zionsville's 4th Mayor on January 1, 2024.

He retired as full-time lead anchor at NBC affiliate WTHR in Indianapolis, Indiana, in December 2018 after nearly 24 years in the job (42 years in broadcasting). He and his wife Amy reside in Zionsville, Indiana, and have five children and one grandchild.

Stehr attended Gannon University in Erie, Pennsylvania, and is the only member of his class to receive a "Distinguished Alumni" award. He graduated with a dual-degree (Communications/Political Science) in 1980. His children are Morgan, Connor, Jeanie, Riley, and Meredith.

== Broadcast career ==
Stehr started his broadcast career at WJET-TV in Erie while still attending Gannon University. After leaving WJET, he went to WSEE-TV, also in Erie. While at WSEE, he was named solo anchor of the weekday 6 pm and 11 pm newscasts at the age of 21.

From there, he made stops at WOTV (now WOOD-TV) in Grand Rapids, Michigan; WISH-TV in Indianapolis; and KUTV in Salt Lake City, Utah.

From 1989 to 1991, Stehr anchored the business news for CNBC's The Money Wheel.

In 1991, he became a correspondent at CBS News. Stehr's reporting focused on personal finance and business issues, appearing primarily on CBS This Morning. He also anchored the CBS Morning News.

In 2018, Stehr was inducted into the Silver Circle of the Lower Great Lakes Region of the National Academy of Television Arts and Sciences for contributions made the broadcasting over at least 25 years.

In December 2018, he was designated a Sagamore of the Wabash by Indiana Governor Eric Holcomb — the highest civilian honor bestowed by the state of Indiana.

Stehr was inducted into the Indiana Broadcasters Association Hall of Fame in October 2022 and the Indiana Journalism Hall of Fame in October 2025.

=== From CBS News to WTHR ===
In July 1995, Stehr was hired away from CBS News to become main anchor of WTHR's weeknight newscasts. His work has earned him multiple regional Emmy Awards. During his tenure, WTHR consistently maintained the top-rated newscasts in the Indianapolis market. The station won the 2011 Edward R. Murrow Award for overall excellence. Stehr announced his retirement on March 28, 2018, but stayed on several extra months due to a co-anchor's illness. He appeared sporadically on the air for another year before ending his broadcasting career at the end of 2019.

=== Political career ===
After retiring from broadcasting, Stehr was appointed to the Zionsville Board of Parks and Recreation, where he served four years, including two years as Board President. He is currently in his first term as Zionsville Mayor.
