= Rob Reynolds (journalist) =

American television journalist

Rob Reynolds is a broadcast journalist, currently working as a Senior Correspondent for Al Jazeera English in Los Angeles.

An Emmy Award-winning journalist, he has over 25 years of international experience, having previously worked for CNN, NBC and CNBC.

Reynolds is one of the sons of the distinguished television news pioneer Frank Reynolds (1923-1983). His brother Dean Reynolds is a CBS News correspondent based in Chicago

== Career ==
Prior to joining Al Jazeera, Reynolds was a journalist at WJZ, Baltimore; CNN, NBC News and CN BC. He was CNBC's correspondent in Washington, D.C. from 1998 to 2006. He reported from the White House, Capitol Hill, and the Supreme Court. He also covered stories overseas: in the fall of 2002 he produced and reported a five-part series on the potential impact of War in Iraq, on location in Egypt, Jordan, and Syria.

NBC

Reynolds was the Moscow correspondent for the American television networks NBC and MSNBC in Moscow from 1996 to 1998. He covered the Boris Yeltsin administration, the MIR space station accident, and other developments in post-Soviet Russia.

CNN

Reynolds worked as a CNN correspondent based in London from 1990 til 1996. He reported from Iraq, Jordan and Kuwait in the run-up to the first Gulf War and during its aftermath. In 1992, his report on "Famine in Africa" was recognized with the award of a Robert F. Kennedy Journalism Award. Reynolds reported extensively from Northern Ireland during the latter stages of the Troubles in that region.

Al Jazeera English

Reynolds joined AJ Jazeera English before the international network's launch in 2006. He covered the 2008 United States presidential election for Al Jazeera, among other assignments. During the campaign, he made an online election diary and took part in an online discussion about the election on LiveStation. More recently, he has served the network's correspondent for the Western United States, based in Los Angeles.

In 2013, he traveled overseas, this time exchanging the Mid-East for South Asia, and reported from Bangladesh, based in Dhaka. In 2015 he reported from Germany, Austria and Finland regarding the mass influx of refugees from Syria, Afghanistan and other countries into Europe. Reynolds has reported frequently regarding the Trump Administration's immigration policies from Ali's Angeles, the US-Mexico Border, and California's Central Valley.
