= Peter Barnes (journalist) =

American journalist

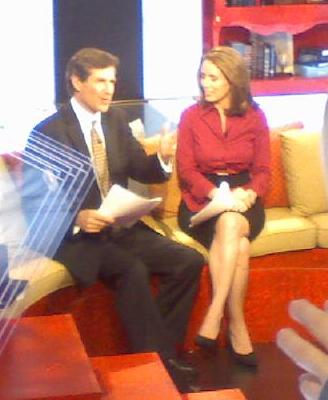
- Peter Barnes (left) and Alexis Glick hosting Money for Breakfast
- Occupation: Television journalist
- Notable credit(s): Money for Breakfast; Capitol Gains

Peter Barnes is a senior Washington correspondent for the Fox Business Network. He joined the network in October 2007. Barnes was previously a co-anchor for FBN's morning program, Money for Breakfast, from its debut on October 15, 2007 to May 9, 2008.

A graduate of Pennsylvania State University with a Bachelor of Arts in political science, Barnes also holds an MBA from the Wharton School at the University of Pennsylvania.

Before joining FBN, Barnes served as the Washington, D.C. bureau chief and correspondent for television group Hearst-Argyle. He has also worked at numerous business programming outlets, including TechTV from 2001 to 2003, where he was the Washington bureau chief for the satellite channel, which specialized in technology coverage.

Barnes served as an anchor and Washington correspondent for CNBC from 1993 to 1998. In 1996, he anchored Capitol Gains, which is a program focusing on political issues in Washington as they impact the economy, the business community and financial markets, aired weekdays from 8 to 8:30 AM ET on CNBC. Barnes received a CableACE Award while at CNBC for a special series on retirement. Before joining CNBC, he was correspondent for WCAU-TV, the CBS owned and operated station in Philadelphia, and a news reporter for KTTV-TV's Fox 11 News in Los Angeles. Prior to that, he was a staff reporter for The Wall Street Journal and The Charlotte Observer.

Barnes was born in Rochester, New York and raised in Philadelphia, Pennsylvania. He is married with two children.
