= Brenda Buttner =

American journalist

- Born: May 22, 1961; Santa Cruz County, California, U.S.
- Died: February 20, 2017 (aged 55); Ridgewood, New Jersey, U.S.
- Education: Harvard University (BA); Balliol College, Oxford (BA)
- Spouse: Tom Adkins (2005–2010)
- Children: 2 daughters

Brenda Buttner (May 22, 1961 – February 20, 2017) was an American broadcast journalist who served as a senior business correspondent and host of Bulls & Bears for Fox News. She also frequently contributed to Your World with Neil Cavuto.

Buttner was born in Santa Cruz County, California. She graduated from Harvard University in 1983 with a bachelor's degree in social studies. She then spent two years as a Rhodes Scholar at Balliol College, Oxford University, England, where she graduated with high honors and received a B.A. in politics and economics. After completing her studies at Oxford, Buttner moved to Reno, Nevada, where she began her television career at NBC affiliate KCRL-TV. She was a former feature editor of Cycle World magazine, an enthusiast motorcycle publication.

Buttner hosted CNBC's The Money Club and served as a Washington correspondent from 1990 to 1993 and general correspondent from 1995 to 1998 for the cable outlet. In 2000, she joined Fox News where she would spend the rest of her career.

Buttner received numerous awards for her work, including a Cable Ace Award in 1996 for best business programming (The Money Club) and a National Clarion award in 1990 for best news story. In addition, many of her personal finance articles have been published in popular publications such as The New York Times and Ladies' Home Journal.

She was a resident of Ridgewood, New Jersey. She died at age 55 on February 20, 2017, following a battle with cancer.
