= Hadley Gamble =

American television journalist (born 1981)

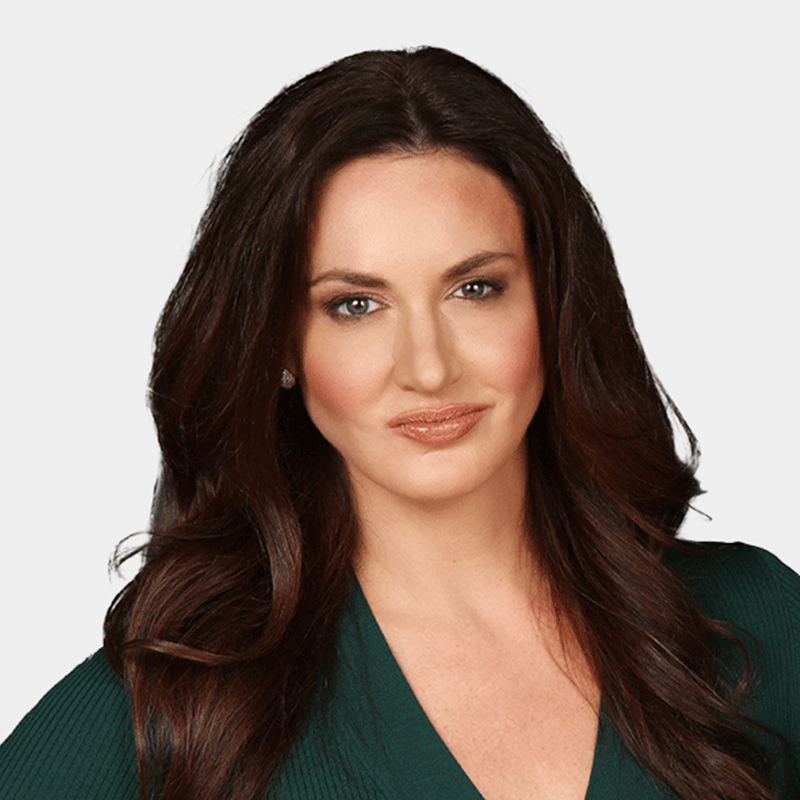
Hadley Gamble

Hadley Gamble (born Laura Gamble; 10 September 1981) is an American television journalist and former CNBC anchor who is based in Abu Dhabi.

== Early life and education ==
Gamble grew up in Knoxville, Tennessee, and attended Halls High School. She earned a Bachelor of Science from the University of Miami, Florida, in 2003.

== Career ==
Prior to joining CNBC, Gamble worked for ABC News and Fox News in Washington, D.C.

At CNBC, Gamble was an anchor and Senior International Correspondent based in Abu Dhabi, where she presented Capital Connection as well as fronting CNBC's feature franchise Access: Middle East whose guests included King Abdullah II of Jordan, US Secretary of State Mike Pompeo, Blackrock CEO Larry Fink, Egyptian President Abdel Fattah el-Sisi, Facebook's Sean Parker, HRH Princess Reema bin Bandar Al-Saud, Bill Gates, U.S. Treasury Secretary Steven Mnuchin, and U.S. Secretary of Defense Mark Esper.

In October 2018, she interviewed Saudi Foreign Minister Adel Al-Jubeir, the first comment from a Saudi official following Jamal Khashoggi's assassination. She was also the first international journalist to be live on the ground at Aramco oil facilities in September 2019 reporting the damage left by Iranian rockets and drones.

Gamble is the last Western journalist to interview Russian President Vladimir Putin before his invasion of Ukraine; she was criticized by the state-run Russian media for her appearance and body language throughout the interview, even labeling her as a "sex object" and comparing her to Sharon Stone's interrogation scene in Basic Instinct.

Gamble has reported several times from the World Economic Forum in Davos.

In 2024, Gamble joined the Arab news channel Al Arabiya English as its chief international anchor and host of The Hadley Gamble Show. Gamble is a contributor for Semafor

=== Sexual harassment complaint against Jeff Shell ===
Gamble's name was released as being the basis for the sexual harassment complaint against NBCUniversal CEO Jeff Shell that led to his ouster on April 23, 2023. On May 10, 2023 a CNBC spokesperson confirmed "Capital Connection" anchor Gamble's pending departure from the network, with no reason given.
