= Consuelo Mack =

American journalist

- Born: Consuelo Cotter; November 30, 1949 (age 76); New York City, New York, U.S.
- Education: Sarah Lawrence College (B.A., 1972); Concord Academy
- Occupations: journalist, TV presenter-interviewer
- Known for: WealthTrack TV program
- Title: Host, WealthTrack
- Spouse(s): Walter Mack, Jr.

Consuelo Mack (née Cotter, born 30 November 1949 in New York, New York) is an American business news journalist and host of WealthTrack, a news program presented by WLIW-TV in New York City, distributed by American Public Television, and aired weekly, primarily on PBS-TV station affiliates.

Before developing WealthTrack, she spent over a decade at The Wall Street Journal as the Anchor and Managing Editor of The Wall Street Journal Report, since hosted by Maria Bartiromo and Rebecca Quick. During her tenure, it won the Overseas Press Club award. Prior to that, she did stints on the Financial News Network, and anchor and executive editor on the syndicated television series, Today's Business, which only lasted one season from 1986 to 1987, due to low ratings.

== Early life and education ==
Mack grew up in Weston, Massachusetts, and studied at the Concord Academy.

She attended Sarah Lawrence College and graduated in 1972 with a bachelor's degree in English Literature, History, and Political Science.

After college, Mack was a trainee in the account-executive program of Merrill Lynch, Pierce, Fenner & Smith, stockbrokers.

== Personal life ==
In 1974, she married lawyer Walter Staunton Mack, Jr., an alumnus of Milton Academy in Massachusetts, Harvard College, and Columbia Law School. He was a captain in the United States Marine Corps.

== Selected memberships and honors ==
She is a member of the Economic Club of New York, the Council on Foreign Relations, The Women’s Forum and is a board member of the YMCA of Greater New York.
