= The Action Network =

Sports data and technology company

- Company type: Private
- Founded: 2017
- Headquarters: New York, New York
- Key people: Patrick Keane, CEO; Chad Millman, CCO; Brian Mead, Head of Product
- Website: www.actionnetwork.com

The Action Network is a sports media company featuring news and analysis focused on sports betting in the United States.

== History ==
The company was founded by The Chernin Group in October 2017, through the acquisition of three companies: Sports Insights, FantasyLabs and the SportsAction mobile app.

In October 2017, Chad Millman joined the company as chief content officer. Millman was previously editor-in-chief for ESPN The Magazine and ESPN.com.

In November 2018, the company announced the appointment of Patrick Keane as CEO. Keane was a former board member at Bleacher Report, and was an original seed stage investor in The Action Network.

In July 2019, Ari Borod joined the company as Chief Commercial Officer. Borod formerly was Vice President of Fantasy Sports and Legal & Business Affairs at FanDuel.

On October 22, 2019, MLB umpire Joe West filed a defamation lawsuit in New York against Action Network and former MLB player Paul Lo Duca over comments Lo Duca made on a podcast carried by the network in April 2019, recalling his Mets teammate Billy Wagner telling him in 2006-07, "Joe loves antique cars so every time he comes into town I lend him my ’57 Chevy so he can drive it around so then he opens up the strike zone for me." In the complaint West denies this and says he has suffered unspecified damages as a result of Lo Duca's comments.

On May 3, 2021, the company announced it had been acquired by the sports betting media group Better Collective for $240 million.

== Content ==
The Action Network has a content partnership with ESPN, producing a daily show streaming on the ESPN+ platform called I'll Take That Bet.

On August 27, 2018, the company announced a partnership with Cadence13 to launch a podcast network dedicated to sports gambling.

Sports business analyst, Darren Rovell, joined the company on November 28, 2018. Rovell previously worked for ESPN and CNBC.

On April 25, 2019, the company announced a partnership with SiriusXM to launch a daily show on the Fantasy Sports Radio channel that will deliver a mix of sports betting insights and fantasy sports analysis.

In January 2022, the company began a partnership with the New York Post. Later that year, in August, Action Network began a two-year media partnership deal with The Philadelphia Inquirer.
