= Carmen Rita Wong =

American financial journalist

- Born: New York City, U.S.
- Education: Fairfield University (BA); Columbia University (MS)
- Occupations: Author, journalist & personal finance expert
- Notable credit(s): CNBC On the Money (2005) host, financial contributor for CBS This Morning, Marketplace Money host Author, "Generation Debt"
- Children: 1
- Website: http://carmenritawong.com/

Carmen Rita Wong, is an American radio, television and online journalist, and personal finance expert at CNBC where she was the former host of the 2005 version of On the Money, a personal finance program. She was a contributor to The Dr. Oz Show and iVillage. Wong also writes a blog for CNBC.com that focuses on taking control of your personal finances.

== Career ==
In October 2013, she was named host of the weekly radio program Marketplace Money, produced by American Public Media, beginning with the program of November 2, 2013. While giving financial advice on the Marketplace Money program of October 26, 2013, she also revealed that she is now divorced and a single mother. As of February, 2014, Marketplace's website refers to her as a "Former Host."

Wong's blog made its debut on Qvisory.com and her advice columns appear monthly in Glamour, Men's Health and Latina as well as online. Wong also makes contributions to Essence and Diversity Women magazines. She has been making her name as a money expert appearing on CNN, The Rachael Ray Show, and Oprah Winfrey's XM radio network.

In March 2009 Wong's accomplishments were honored at the eighth annual New York City Women's History Month Celebration.

== Generation Debt ==
Wong is the author of Generation Debt: Take Control of Your Money—A How-to Guide published by Grand Central Publishing in 2006. This 272 page book concentrates on the under-40 crowd giving tips on what to do about student loans and consumer debt. The guide also provides recommendations on how to establish a goal-oriented budget, make the most of payback options, and utilize employee savings and investment plans. Her book has appeared on the recommended reading list of The Wall Street Journal and her advice has been highlighted in The Washington Post.

Wong's second book entitled The Real Cost of Living: Making the Best Decisions for You, Your Life and Your Money was released by Perigee/Penguin in December 2010.

== Education ==
Wong received a Bachelor's degree in psychology and art history from Fairfield University (Connecticut) and a Master's degree in psychology from Columbia University in New York City.

== Personal ==
Wong is of Spanish, Dominican descent. Her father, Peter Wong, is of Chinese descent, though he is not her biological father. Carmen Rita Wong, formerly known as Carmen Wong Ulrich, has a daughter, Bianca (born 2006). On BBC world service radio Outlook she discusses the story behind her search for the truth of her ancestry.
