= Darren Rovell =

American sports journalist (born 1978)

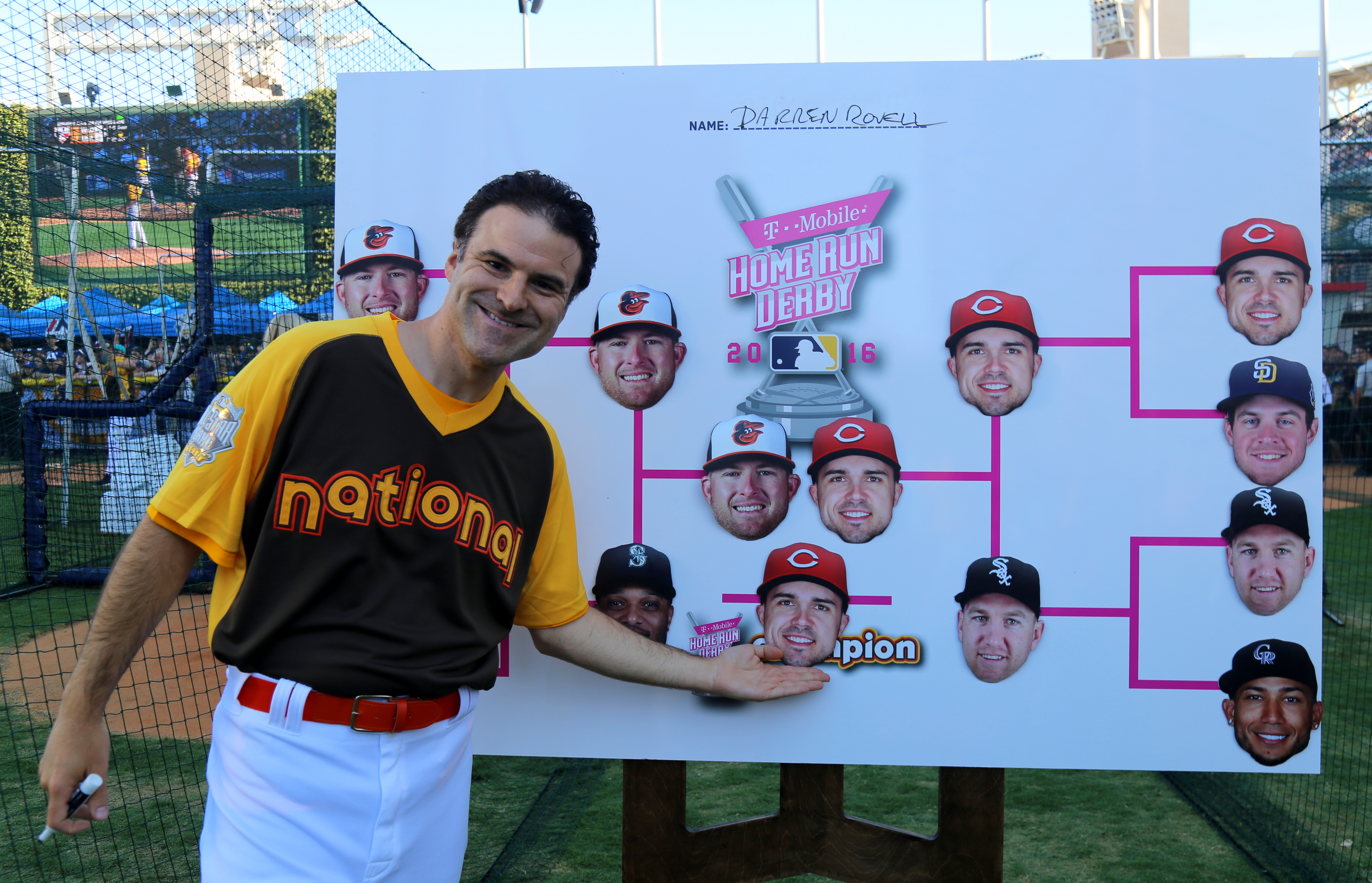
Darren Rovell

Darren Rovell (born June 30, 1978) is a sports business analyst who works for The Action Network. He previously worked for ESPN.

== Early life and education ==
He attended and graduated cum laude from Northwestern University in Evanston, Illinois, in 2000, where he is on the advisory board for graduate programs in sports administration. He majored in theater. However, he also hosted a college radio show about sports business.

Rovell interned for FoxSports.com.

== Professional life ==
Rovell was recruited out of college as a sports business writer for ESPN.com. He reported on sports agents, endorsements, and contracts frequently on ESPN's SportsCenter.

Rovell joined CNBC in 2006.

He has anchored five primetime documentaries for CNBC:

- Swoosh! Inside Nike
- Inside Track: Refueling the Business of NASCAR
- As Seen on TV
- Business Model: Inside the Sports Illustrated Swimsuit Issue
- Behind The Counter: The Untold Story of Franchising

Rovell wrote the book First In Thirst: How Gatorade Turned The Science of Sweat Into A Cultural Phenomenon and co-wrote the book On the Ball: What You Can Learn About Business From America's Sports Leaders with David Carter.

He also reports on non-sports business matters for ABC News.

Rovell was part of the Outside the Lines report that disclosed the NCAA's investigation into whether Texas A&M quarterback Johnny Manziel was earning money from the sale of autographs, in potential violation of NCAA rules.

On November 28, 2018, The Action Network announced that Rovell was joining the company as a senior executive producer reporting to Michael J. Leboff.

== Controversy ==
In November 2009, Rovell made controversial remarks in an article regarding an American athlete, Meb Keflezighi, the first American to win a New York City Marathon since 1982, by suggesting that he was a ringer. He later apologized.

On November 17, 2011, Rovell sent a tweet to his followers on Twitter, asking them to come forward with stories about how their businesses were losing money during the 2011 NBA lockout. A high school senior named "Tim," annoyed with Rovell's behavior at the time, created a fake name and email account, telling Rovell online that he owned an escort service in New York frequented by NBA players, which was losing 30% of its business. Rovell failed to verify the authenticity, and ran the story in a CNBC column. "Tim" came forward with the story months later to the website Deadspin, because, he said, "he's just such a [expletive] on twitter all the time [I] just got fed up." Deadspin made Rovell aware of his mistake. On the same day, Rovell released an apology on CNBC saying, "there will always be people out there who want their 15 minutes of fame and not really care how they get there."

== Awards ==
Emmy Award for his contribution to NBC's 2008 Election coverage.

== Personal life ==
Rovell married Cortney Brooke Schlosser in a Jewish wedding in 2008.
