= Ted David =

American journalist

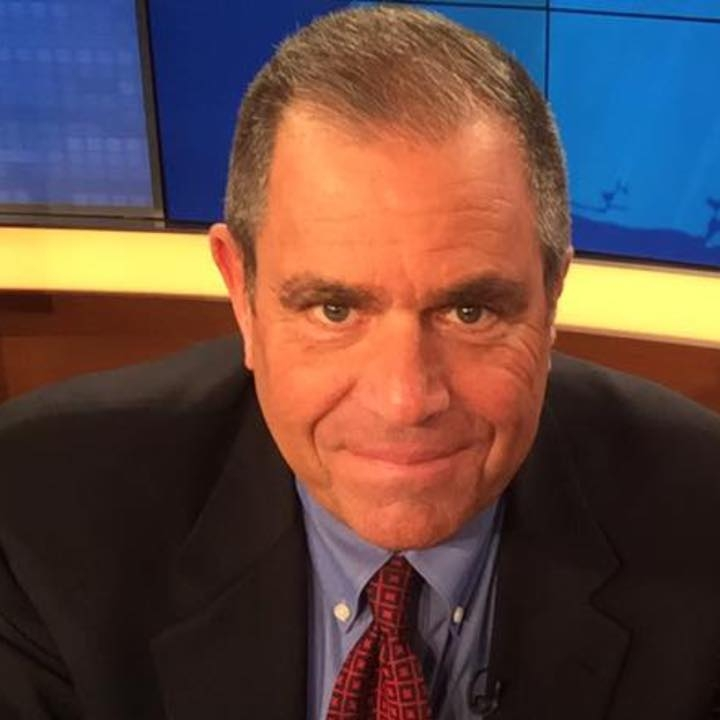
- Born: April 30, 1949 (age 77); New York City, U.S.
- Occupations: Radio and TV anchor
- Notable credit(s): Founding anchor, CNBC TV 1989
- Spouse: Jane
- Children: 2
- Website: http://www.teddavid.net

Ted David, an American financial journalist, was part of the launch team that put CNBC television on the air in April 1989. He was employed at CNBC as senior anchor for CNBC Business Radio until his retirement from the network in May, 2009. More recently, David was heard as a freelance anchor on New York's all news station 1010 WINS. He continued to be seen occasionally as a freelance anchor on Cablevision's News12 Long Island until his retirement in August 2017. He was seen or heard from time to time on ABC's former daytime drama One Life To Live. He was also a freelance reporter and anchor at Business Week TV until the program's cancellation in late 2008.

Prior to his CNBC Radio assignment, David was co-anchor of CNBC's Morning Call. He has anchored news updates at MSNBC and has done weekend anchoring at WNBC-TV, in New York City.

Before joining CNBC, David was an ABC Radio News correspondent for eight years. His other radio credits include stints at New York stations WLIX, WGBB, WGSM, WHLI, WKJY, WABC, WPIX, WPLJ, and regular business reports on WCBS NewsRadio 880.

David has won a National Press Club citation for best consumer journalism; an Ohio State Award for Excellence in Educational, Informational and Public Affairs Broadcasting; and the American Cancer Society's Gaspar Award. In 2016, he won the Press Club of Long Island's 2016 Media Awards First Place, Video Breaking News—"Roosevelt Field Shooting."

David holds bachelor's and master's degrees, and has taught on the high school and college level. He was licensed as an emergency medical technician in New York State in 1981. He holds a certificate in technical analysis of the futures markets from the New York Institute of Finance. He is also a licensed amateur radio operator (ham).

Ted David and his wife Jane were married in 1974, and have two grown sons and two grandchildren.

== Host: CNBC shows ==
- Morning Call (2002–2006)
- The Edge (Mar. 2000-Feb. 2002)
- Street Signs (2000–2002)
- Weekly Business (1999–2001)
- Market Watch (1998–2002)
- Market Wrap (1991–2000)
- The Money Wheel (1989–1998)

== See also ==
- New Yorkers in journalism
