= Business Insiders =

US television program

- Presented by: Ron Insana
- Country of origin: United States
- Original language: English

Original release
- Network: CNBC
- Release: 1992 – 1997

Business Insiders is a business news talk show that was aired weekdays from 6 to 6:30 PM ET on CNBC between 1992 and 1997. The show was hosted by Ron Insana and Neil Cavuto.
