= Steals and Deals =

- Presented by: Janice Lieberman (?-1997)
- Country of origin: United States
- Original language: English

Original release
- Network: CNBC
- Release: 1990 – 1997

Related
- Great Stuff

Steals and Deals is an evening business news talk show aired weekdays from 7:30 to 8PM ET on CNBC from 1990 until c. 1997. Hosted by Janice Lieberman. Produced by Glenn Ruppel.

Steals and Deals was CNBC's nightly investigative consumer finance show. The show's tagline was "If it sounds too good to be true, it probably is."
