= Capital Connection (TV programme) =

- Program Logo in 2010
- Genre: News Program
- Created by: CNBC
- Presented by: Dan Murphy
- Countries of origin: United Arab Emirates; Singapore
- Original language: English

Production
- Production locations: Singapore (2007–2022); London (2007–2015); Bahrain (2010–2011); Abu Dhabi (2018–2025); Dubai (2018–2025)
- Running time: 60 minutes

Original release
- Network: CNBC Asia
- Release: 26 March 2007 – 4 April 2025

Related
- Squawk Box

Capital Connection was a weekday television business news program, broadcast on CNBC channels around the world. The show aired live from CNBC's Middle East Headquarters in Abu Dhabi and Dubai.

== Format ==
Capital Connection broadcast global business and financial market news and analysis. The program combined asset market reaction from Asia, Europe and the United States, with political and geopolitical analysis from the Middle East region.

The program aired from 0900 AM -1000 AM GST, 12:00 PM – 13:00 PM SGT and 0500 AM – 0600 AM GMT. Capital Connection also aired on CNBC World in the United States, weekdays from midnight to 1am ET, and was available to stream live via CNBC Pro.

== History ==
First launched in 2007, Capital Connection replaced Today's Business, a pre-market program originating from CNBC Europe which also aired on CNBC Asia and CNBC World. The launch anchor of the program was Steve Sedgwick.

== Previous hosts and anchors ==
Steve Sedgwick left the program to work full-time for Squawk Box Europe and was replaced by Rebecca Meehan on 1 December 2008 and in 2010 by Anna Edwards. After Edwards departed at the end of 2011, Meehan returned as European anchor and continued in that role until she left CNBC at the end of 2012.

Maura Fogarty served as Asian anchor from the launch until March 2010, when she was replaced by Chloe Cho until she left the network in January 2014. Sri Jegarajah, previously a reporter, was promoted to anchor full-time, and subsequently permanently took the presenting role.

In 2010 and 2011, the show had a third anchor. On 14 June 2010 Yousef Gamal El-Din, joined the show from the network's then-newly opened Bahrain studio. Originally, this leg of the show was only featured from Monday to Thursday, but was later featured every weekday from February 2011 to November 2011, when the Bahrain leg was discontinued altogether. As a result, Capital Connection reverted to two continents (Asia and Europe).

Between 31 December 2012 and 12 July 2013, the London studios was on hiatus after Meehan's departure from CNBC and the programme came from a single location and was solely presented from Singapore. On 15 July 2013, the European anchor was reinstated with Carolin Roth (also previously a reporter) in the presenters' chair until 29 August 2014. On 20 October 2014, Helia Ebrahimi replaced Roth on the anchoring role until she left CNBC altogether in March 2015. In July 2015, Nancy Hungerford (previously a producer in CNBC Europe, who then became a reporter and anchor full-time) joined as European anchor for Capital Connection until she was reassigned at the end of that year (Hungerford would ultimately return to the show as an anchor, this time based in Singapore, a year and a half later).

On 9 February 2015, Capital Connection updated its logo. The opening animation sequence was shared with CNBC US' Squawk on the Street.

On 4 January 2016, due to CNBC International's cutbacks at its London operations, Capital Connection was permanently reduced to a single location in Singapore, with Jegarajah as its solo anchor. This was the first time that the show did not have an anchor based in London.

On 3 October 2016, Pauline Chiou, who had previously anchored The Rundown since its 31 March 2014 debut, replaced Sri Jegarajah as anchor after the latter was elevated to CNBC Asia's Senior Correspondent.

On 3 July 2017, Nancy Hungerford, who was previously a correspondent and relief anchor in CNBC Europe, joined CNBC Asia and rejoined the programme as an anchor, replacing Chiou.

From 30 October 2017 until the end of March 2018, when Europe was not on DST, the show was expanded to two hours, starting at 5am CET. This was the first time that live programming had been broadcast during this hour as previously the hour had been filled by a showing of Fast Money on a six-hour tape delay or by pre-recorded programmes. The show was once again expanded to two hours on 29 October 2018, and again on 28 October 2019, again with Europe not on DST.

On 16 April 2018, Hadley Gamble, who was previously a Middle East-based correspondent with CNBC Europe, joined the show as its European anchor. She is based from the network's newly opened studio in Abu Dhabi, with Hungerford still based in Singapore. On 4 February 2019, Matthew Taylor, who was previously a Sydney-based correspondent, moved to the network's Singapore Exchange studio and replaced Nancy Hungerford as anchor there, with Gamble still based in Abu Dhabi.

On 3 January 2023, Dan Murphy replaced Matthew Taylor following the latter's departure from CNBC. Murphy is based at the Dubai International Financial Centre in Dubai, which replaced Singapore as the second primary location for Capital Connection. Therefore, the program now originated from Dubai and Abu Dhabi.

Murphy became solo anchor in May 2023 after Gamble departed CNBC following a sexual harassment claim she filed against NBCUniversal CEO Jeff Shell that led to his ouster.

On 4 April 2025, Capital Connection aired its final show. It was replaced on 7 April 2025 by a new program, Access Middle East, also anchored by Murphy.

== See also ==
- Worldwide Exchange
- Today's Business
