= Alexis Glick =

American television personality (born 1972)

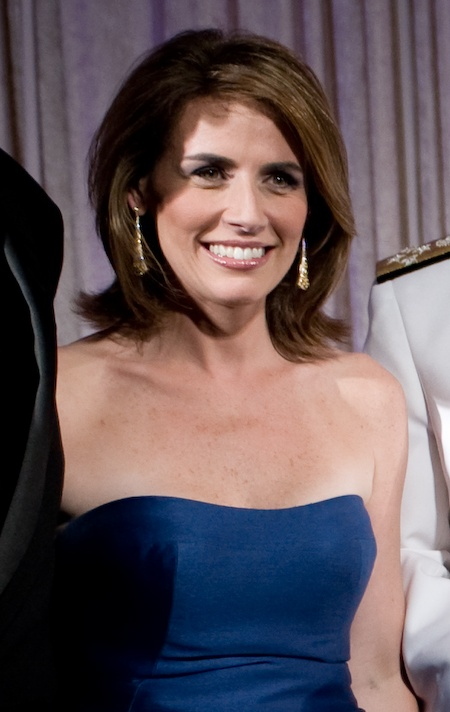
- Glick in 2008
- Born: Alexis Cahill Donnelly; August 7, 1972 (age 53); New York City, U.S.
- Spouse: Oren Glick

Alexis Glick (born Alexis Cahill Donnelly; August 7, 1972) is an American former television personality, who was an anchor of Money for Breakfast and The Opening Bell on Fox Business, as well as the Vice President of Business News. She left the channel in December 2009.

== Early life and education ==
Glick grew up in the private residential development of Stuyvesant Town in Manhattan. Her father, Robert E. Donnelly, is an entertainment lawyer in Manhattan. Her mother, Ellen Cahill Donnelly, was a secretary for Lehman Brothers and is the office manager in Brooklyn for the Forest City Ratner Corporation, a New York real estate developer. Glick's parents live in Dobbs Ferry, New York.

Glick graduated from the Dalton School on the Upper East Side and earned a bachelor's degree in political science from Columbia University.

== Career ==
Glick began her career as an analyst at Goldman Sachs in the Equities Division. She was also an executive at Morgan Stanley where she was in charge of floor operations at the New York Stock Exchange, making her the first and youngest woman to manage such an operation for a bulge bracket firm.

Glick traded consumer and entertainment stocks, utility and real estate investment trusts and most notably, the financials including banks, credit card stocks, government agencies and insurance stocks at Morgan Stanley. She was also one of the top producers on the company's Listed Equity Trading Desk from 1998 through 2001.

=== NBC News/MSNBC/CNBC ===
Glick had worked as a temporary host for the third hour of NBC's Today in 2006. She was also a substitute anchor on Early Today in 2005 and an occasional anchor on MSNBC Live. Previously, Glick was a senior business correspondent for CNBC.

=== Fox News/Fox Business ===
It was announced on September 12, 2006 that Glick would be joining the Fox News as Director of Business News. Glick began appearing on Fox News programming in July 2007. She has interviewed world leaders such as President Barack Obama, Secretary of the Treasury, former Secretary Of Commerce Gary Locke. Henry Paulson, Canadian Prime Minister Stephen Harper, and former Irish head of state John Bruton.

On December 23, 2009, Glick announced that she was leaving the Fox Business.

=== Post-Fox ===
Glick made appearances as a guest commentator on CNN and ABC News.She also guest-hosted on WABC and SiriusXM radio from New York.

Glick served as CEO of the GENYOUth Foundation, a nonprofit dedicated to nurturing child health and wellness through improved nutrition and physical activity, until January 2022 when she stepped down.

== Personal life ==
She is married to Oren Glick, who is Jewish and the founder and president of Shoot Digital, a New York City photography company. They have four children.

Glick has a second home in Watermill, New York in Suffolk County with primary residences in the Gramercy Park and Flatiron neighborhoods of the Manhattan borough in New York City.
