= The Money Club =

American TV series (1995–1997)

- Presented by: Brenda Buttner
- Country of origin: United States
- Original language: English

Original release
- Network: CNBC
- Release: April 1995 – November 1997

Related
- Business Center

The Money Club is a business news talk show aired weekdays from 7 to 7:30 PM ET on CNBC from April 1995 to November 1997. It was hosted by Brenda Buttner.

The Money Club was a personal finance show focused on making and saving money. Targeted at casual as well as seasoned investors, the show featured such regular segments as "Money Matters," "Getting Started," "Mutual Fund Investor," "Of Mutual Interest," "Cashing Out," "Winners and Losers," "Worldwise" and "Books & Bytes." Many of the segments were interactive via viewer call-ins and on-line services. Additionally, investor Jimmy Rogers was a regular Friday night guest on the show.
