= Business Tonight =

- Presented by: Sue Herera
- Country of origin: United States
- Original language: English

Original release
- Network: CNBC
- Release: 3 October 1997

Business Tonight was a business news talk show on CNBC until c. October 1997. The show was hosted by Sue Herera. It was replaced by The Edge.
