= The News with Brian Williams =

American news program anchored by Brian Williams

- Genre: News program
- Presented by: Brian Williams; John Seigenthaler (weekends)
- Country of origin: United States
- Original language: English
- No. of episodes: appx. 2,030

Production
- Running time: 42 minutes

Original release
- Network: MSNBC (1996–2002); CNBC (2002–2004)
- Release: July 15, 1996 – May 14, 2004

The News with Brian Williams (later known as The News on CNBC) is an American news program that premiered on July 15, 1996, MSNBC's first day on the air. It was the first flagship signature news broadcast on both MSNBC and CNBC. The show was hosted by Brian Williams. The News was a broadcast designed mainly for primetime viewers who might have missed that night's NBC Nightly News.

The News with John Seigenthaler (known as the weekend edition) premiered on July 20, 1996, on both MSNBC and CNBC was hosted by John Seigenthaler.

The News was originally shown at 9:00 p.m. ET on MSNBC until July 6, 2001. It was moved to the 8:00 p.m. time slot on July 9, 2001.

During the 2000 United States presidential election, The News was the main program for MSNBC's coverage.

John Seigenthaler (and later various hosts such as Soledad O'Brien, Forrest Sawyer, and some of the presenters from CNBC and MSNBC) often substituted on weekdays for Williams and Seigenthaler on Saturday and Sunday nights during their absence, mainly because of Williams' duties as substitute on NBC Nightly News with Tom Brokaw and Seigenthaler's duties filling in on weekends.

== The News on CNBC ==
The logo of The News on CNBC

In July 2002, MSNBC canceled The News, in order to make room for Phil Donahue's new MSNBC series. The News was then only shown on CNBC at 7:00 p.m. ET, and was the main news broadcast on CNBC. Viewership of The News suffered.

In 2002, NBC announced that Brian Williams would take over from Tom Brokaw on NBC Nightly News in 2004. In the beginning of 2004, Williams stepped down as presenter of The News, and the show's substitute, John Seigenthaler, took over as the new host of The News, which was renamed The News on CNBC.

When Seigenthaler took over on January 19, 2004, The News moved to the 8:00 p.m. ET time slot. The final edition of The News was on May 14, 2004, exactly one week after the cancellation announcement.

CNBC revived The News on September 30, 2020 with Shepard Smith, formerly of Fox News, anchoring. The Smith edition continued until November 2, 2022.

== See also ==
- NBC Nightly News
- The 11th Hour (an MSNBC program originally anchored by Williams)
- The News with Shepard Smith
