= The News with Shepard Smith =

CNBC news television program

- Genre: News program
- Presented by: Shepard Smith
- Country of origin: United States
- Original language: English
- No. of seasons: 2
- No. of episodes: 537

Production
- Production locations: CNBC Global Headquarters; Englewood Cliffs, New Jersey

Original release
- Network: CNBC
- Release: September 30, 2020 – November 2, 2022

The News with Shepard Smith is an American news television program hosted by Shepard Smith that aired on CNBC. The program, which premiered on September 30, 2020, was a general interest news show that aired at 7 pm ET.

The show was the first hosted by Smith since his departure from Fox News in 2019. On November 3, 2022, CNBC canceled the program after two years, and Smith announced his departure from the network.

The News was the first nightly newscast to air on CNBC since May 2004.

== Content ==
Smith has stated that the program is meant to be "fact-based" and will not include analysis or opinion. Smith has stated of the show: "We’re going to have journalists, reporters, sound and video. We’re going to have newsmakers and experts ... but no pundits."

== Episodes ==
The first episode of the show drew 373,000 viewers, "behind major cable news networks but a boost for CNBC for the time period."

The first episodes of the show were being shot in a temporary studio. This studio is a boxed off area in Studio A at CNBC Global Headquarters. This studio was used until construction on a dedicated set was completed. The new set debuted on October 28, 2020.

== See also ==
- List of programs broadcast by CNBC
- List of 2020 American television debuts
- NewsNation Prime (another fact-based newscast, but aired every weekend, on NewsNation)
- NewsNation Live (weekday version of NewsNation Prime on NewsNation)
