= Tom Costello (journalist) =

American journalist

- Born: Thomas Eugene Costello; September 12, 1963 (age 62)
- Education: B.S. in broadcast journalism at the University of Colorado at Boulder; M.A. in Administration/International commerce at Boston University
- Occupations: Journalist, Senior Correspondent
- Employer: NBC News
- Spouse: Astrid Boon
- Children: 2

Thomas Eugene Costello is an American journalist and Senior Correspondent for NBC News, based in Washington, D.C. His reports appear across NBC News platforms, including online, The Today Show, NBC Nightly News, MSNBC, and CNBC. His portfolio of coverage includes aviation and transportation, NASA, consumer and regulatory issues, business, and economics. He also serves as a substitute anchor on NBC News Now, the network's streaming platform.

Costello joined NBC News in 2004 as a New York–based correspondent. In 2005, he moved to Washington, D.C., at the request of then-Bureau Chief Tim Russert. Before joining NBC News, Costello served as the senior correspondent at CNBC Business News in New York.

Since 2005, Costello has been NBC News' lead aviation correspondent. Among the major aviation stories he's covered: two fatal crashes of the 737-MAX and the subsequent investigations; the shootdown of a Ukrainian jetliner over Tehran in 2020; the loss of Malaysia Airlines flight 370; the crash of Asiana flight 214 in San Francisco; Air France flight 447 over the Atlantic; Colgan Air flight 3407 in Buffalo; Comair flight 5191 in Lexington; and the Miracle on the Hudson landing in 2009 for which NBC News was honored with a prestigious Sigma Delta Chi Award and a National Emmy Award for Breaking News Coverage.

In January, 2021 Costello covered the break-in at the U.S. Capitol and the arrests that followed. He's also covered the Coronavirus outbreak and the search for a COVID vaccine; NASA's return to crewed missions with SpaceX; the 2018–2019 government shutdown; the Philadelphia train derailment that killed 8; the 2017 Unite the Right rally that turned violent in Charlottesville, VA; and the deliberate crash of a Germanwings plane in France.

== Education ==
Costello received a bachelor's degree in broadcast journalism from the University of Colorado at Boulder in 1987 and a master's degree in Administration/International Commerce from Boston University at its Graduate Center in Brussels, Belgium. In 2018, Costello earned a certificate in Cybersecurity Risk Management from HarvardX. On April 29, 2023, Dr. Tom Costello received an honorary doctor of letters degree from Capitol Technology University in Laurel, Maryland.

== Career ==
After spending two years at KVIA-TV in El Paso and six years at KUSA-TV in Denver, Costello contributed to Financial Times TV and CNN while earning a master's degree in Brussels, Belgium.

From 1996 to 2004, Costello worked at CNBC business news. From 1996 to 1999, he reported from London for both CNBC and NBC News, covering Europe's economic union and the death of Princess Diana, among many stories. From 1999 to 2002, he served as CNBC's Nasdaq correspondent and was on duty in Manhattan when terrorists attacked on 9/11.

Former NBC Washington Bureau Chief Tim Russert brought Costello to the DC bureau in 2005. Previously, he was based at NBC News headquarters in New York.

NBC's coverage of the Miracle on the Hudson in 2009 was honored with a prestigious Sigma Delta Chi Award from the Society of Professional Journalists. Costello also led NBC's coverage of the 2008 Financial Bailout Talks in Congress, for which NBC was honored with a National Emmy Award.

His assignments have taken him around the world – from terrorist bombings in London and Madrid, to the Korean DMZ, across the Persian Gulf, Russia, Kazakhstan, Japan, Central America, Eastern and Western Europe.

He has been recognized with national and regional Emmy awards, Edward R Murrow honors National Headliner awards, awards from the Society of Professional Journalists, the duPont-Columbia University Award for Excellence in Journalism and awards from the Associated Press, Gannett, the Radio Television Digital News Association, the University of Colorado and Boston University. In 2019, he became the only journalist ever honored with the NATCA National Air Traffic Controllers Association's Sentinel of Safety Award.

=== Career timeline ===
- Reporter for KVIA-TV in El Paso, Texas
- Reporter for KUSA-TV in Denver, Colorado
- 1995–1996: Correspondent for Financial Times TV, CNN, and CNBC Europe
- 1995–2003: CNBC
  - 1996–1999: London anchor
  - 1999–2002: NASDAQ editor
- 2004–present: NBC News
  - 2004–2005: New York City–based correspondent
  - 2005–present: Washington-based correspondent for NBC News

== Personal life ==
Costello is originally from Centennial, Colorado. He is married to Astrid Boon of Brussels, Belgium and has two children.
