= Rebecca Quick =

American journalist (born 1972)

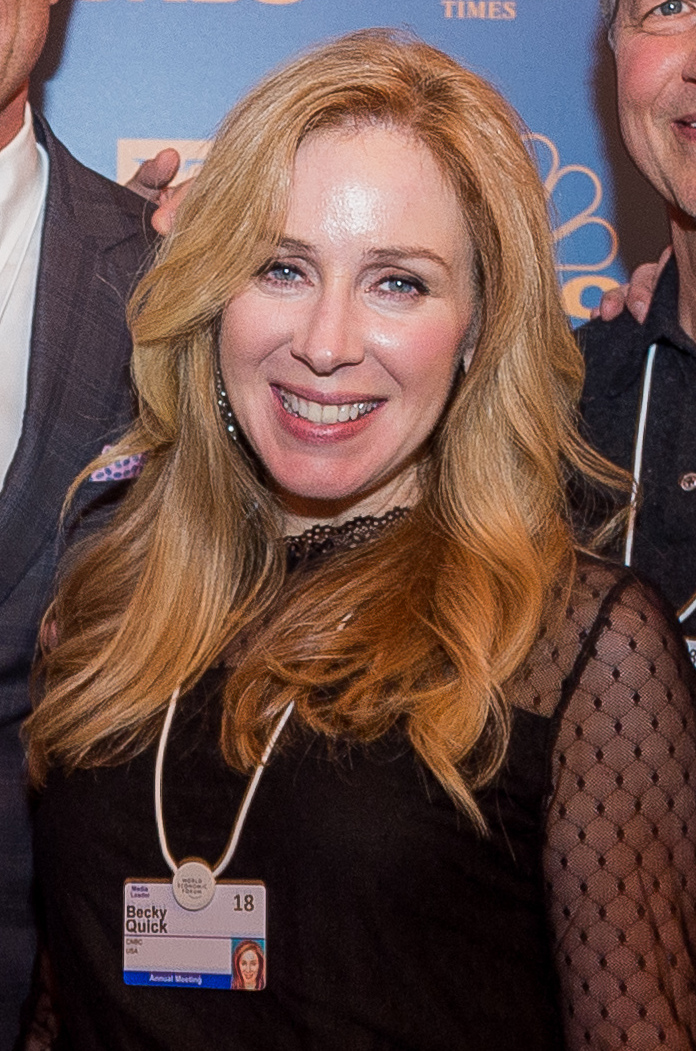
- Becky Quick in 2018
- Born: July 18, 1972 (age 54); Gary, Indiana, U.S.
- Education: Rutgers University (BA)
- Occupations: CNBC's Squawk Box co-anchor, former writer
- Spouses: Peter Shay (divorced); Matt Quayle (m. 2008)
- Children: 2

Rebecca Quick (born July 18, 1972) is an American television journalist/newscaster and co-anchorwoman of CNBC's financial news shows Squawk Box and On the Money.

== Biography ==
=== Early life ===
Quick grew up in Indiana, Ohio, Texas, and Oklahoma as her geologist father and her family followed "booms" in oil production. The family ultimately settled in Medford, New Jersey.

=== Education and career ===
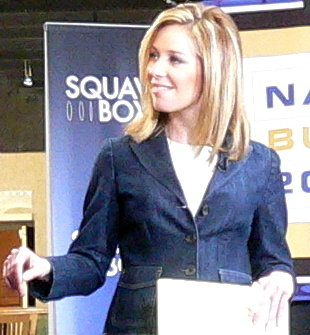
Quick in 2006

Quick graduated from Rutgers University in 1993 with a BA in Political Science, where she was editor-in-chief of The Daily Targum. As an undergraduate, she was awarded the Times Mirror Fellowship from the Journalism Resources Institute at Rutgers. Prior to her employment at CNBC, she covered retail and e-commerce industry topics for The Wall Street Journal and helped launch the paper's website in April 1996. She served as the site's International News Editor, overseeing foreign affairs coverage. She was a co-moderator of the October 28, 2015, Republican presidential debate.

Over the course of her career, Quick has interviewed some of the world's most influential investors and financial power brokers, including among others: Warren Buffett, Bill Gates, Alan Greenspan, T. Boone Pickens, Jamie Dimon, and Charlie Munger. She has also interviewed three U.S. presidents, and hosted the 2007 television documentary "Warren Buffett: The Billionaire Next Door Going Global".

=== Personal life ===
Quick was previously married to Peter Shay, a computer programmer. She is currently married to an executive producer of Squawk Box, Matt Quayle (2008–present). On August 16, 2011, CNBC reported that Quick had given birth to a son. In October 2016, Quick gave birth to a daughter.

In January 2026, Quick went public with her daughter's diagnosis of SYNGAP1-related intellectual disability. While Quick's daughter was diagnosed just before her third birthday, Quick only decided to speak publicly about her daughter's condition to raise awareness of over 10,000 rare diseases and to connect families facing similar journeys who often feel isolated. Her experience inspired the launch of CNBC Cures, a multi-platform initiative aimed at building community, increasing visibility of rare diseases, and advocating for improved treatments and support for affected individuals and their families.

Quick lives in New Jersey with her husband, their children, and his two daughters.

== See also ==
- List of journalists in New York City
