= Ron Insana =

American journalist

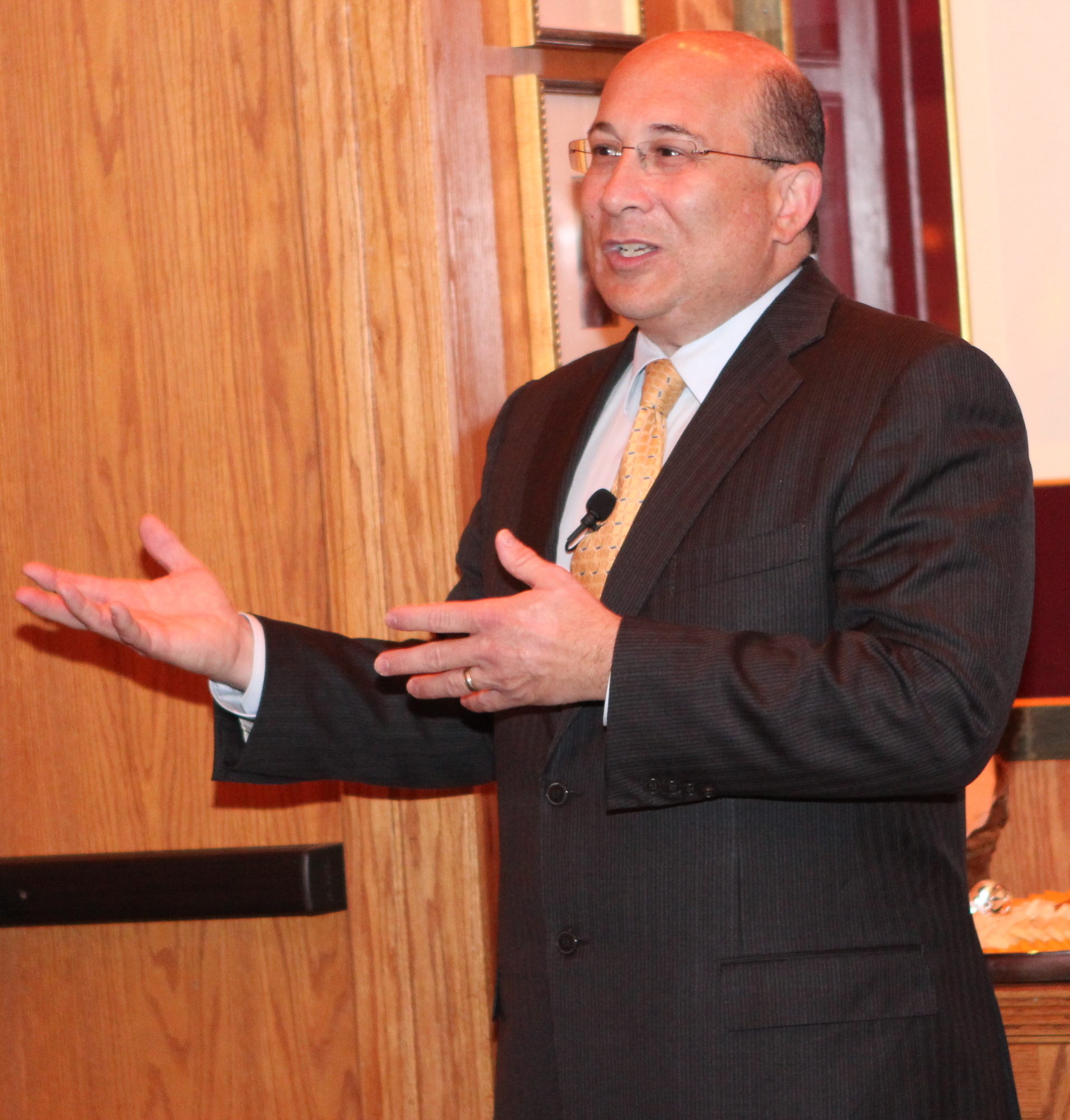
- Ron Insana in 2012
- Born: Ronald G. Insana; March 31, 1961 (age 65); Buffalo, New York, U.S.
- Education: Chaminade College Preparatory School
- Alma mater: California State University, Northridge
- Occupations: Finance reporter, author, former hedge fund manager

Ronald G. Insana (born March 31, 1961) is an American finance reporter, author and former hedge fund manager. He presents the Market Score Board Report with Ron Insana radio show, syndicated by Compass, and is a senior analyst and commentator at CNBC. Insana was the Managing Director of Insana Capital Partners from inception to dissolution. He was the anchor of CNBC's Street Signs, which aired on weekdays during stock market hours. Until December 5, 2003, he and Sue Herera co-anchored CNBC's then flagship nightly financial news program, Business Center.

He has been a resident of Tenafly, New Jersey.

== Early life and education ==
Born in Buffalo, New York, Insana's family moved to Los Angeles while he was in seventh grade. He graduated from Chaminade College Preparatory in 1979 and was recognized as "Distinguished Alumnus of the Year" in 2005. Later, he graduated with honors from California State University, Northridge.

== Career ==
=== Broadcasting ===
Insana began his career in 1984 as a Financial News Network production assistant, rising to managing editor and chief of FNN's Los Angeles bureau just as the Network was integrated into CNBC. While at FNN, he was nominated for a Golden ACE Award for his role in covering the 1987 stock market crash. Insana joined CNBC in the 1991 merger with the FNN.

On the morning of September 11, 2001, Insana was walking towards the World Trade Center (aware of the ongoing attack) with MSNBC producer John Zeta. As they saw one of the towers begin to collapse, they turned and ran. The pair lost each other in a cloud of oncoming dust. Insana took refuge inside a parked car. Still covered in dust, he described what he had witnessed on NBC's Today show with Matt Lauer and Katie Couric. He was nominated for a News and Documentary Emmy Award as part of NBC's coverage of 9/11.

Today, Insana is a regular contributor to NBC's The Today Show and NBC Nightly News, along with other programs when market activity warrants. He was involved with Imus in the Morning on MSNBC before its cancellation and the 15-minute Market Wrap on sister network MSNOW. Additionally, Insana writes a monthly column for USA Today entitled "Talking Business with Ron Insana" and at one time hosted the nationally syndicated radio program, The Ron Insana Show, on Westwood One.

=== Finance ===
On March 1, 2006, Insana left his anchor duties when his contract at CNBC expired to start his own hedge fund, Insana Capital Partners. The fund was headquartered in Fort Lee, New Jersey and had seven employees. In August 2008 the fund ceased operations because of investment losses and he joined SAC Capital Advisors in an unknown capacity. On February 27, 2009, Mr. Insana left SAC Capital.

=== Writing ===
His first book, Traders' Tales (John Wiley), a compendium of anecdotes about Wall Street life, was published in 1996. A second book, The Message of the Markets, was published by Harpers Business in October 2000. Trend Watching: How to Avoid Wall Street's Next Fads, Manias and Bubbles, his third book, was published by Harpers Business in November 2002.

== TV roles ==
=== CNBC TV ===
- Street Signs (1996–2002, 2003–2006)
- Business Center (1999–2003)
- Business Insiders (?-1996(?))
- Management Today
