= Terry Keenan =

American journalist, writer, columnist, news anchor

- Born: June 1, 1961; Albany, New York, U.S.
- Died: October 23, 2014 (aged 53); New York City, U.S.
- Occupations: News anchor, journalist, writer, columnist
- Spouse: Ronald Kass (m. 1994)
- Children: 1

Terry Keenan (June 1, 1961 – October 23, 2014) was an American economic/business columnist for the New York Post, and a former anchor for CNN. Keenan was host of the Fox News stocks/investment program Cashin' In from 2001 to 2009, and a senior business correspondent for Fox News and Fox Business. In September 2009 she became a Fox News contributor, in addition to being an economic/business columnist for the New York Post, which is owned by Fox parent company NewsCorp.

== Early life ==
Born in Albany, New York, Keenan had two sisters. Her father, Joseph, worked at the University at Albany, SUNY as a professor in sociology and her mother Marie ran a young women's employment agency. She was educated at the Academy of the Holy Names and later earned an undergraduate degree in mathematics at Johns Hopkins University in 1983.

== Career ==
After graduation, she was initially hired by PBS to work as a writer and producer before moving to CNN in 1986 and worked there in various capacities until 1995. Keenan worked behind the camera as a producer before moving into an on-air role. In 1995, she jumped to CNBC, where she anchored until returning to CNNfn in January 1998 after being unable to reach a mutual agreement on a new assignment. Upon her return, she became a senior correspondent for Moneyline and anchored Street Sweep. She joined Fox in 2002 where she was a business correspondent and also anchored the investment program Cashin' In. In September 2009 she became a Fox News contributor, in addition to being an economic/business columnist for the New York Post, which is owned by Fox parent company NewsCorp.

== Personal life and death ==
Keenan married Ronald Kass, a vice-president of a manufacturer of home decorating/furnishing products, in 1994. They had a son, Benjamin. Keenan died suddenly on October 23, 2014, from a brain hemorrhage, at age 53.
