= On the Money (2005 TV program) =

- Presented by: Dylan Ratigan (2005–2006); Melissa Francis (2007); Carmen Wong Ulrich (2008–2009)
- Country of origin: United States
- Original language: English

Production
- Running time: 60 minutes

Original release
- Network: CNBC
- Release: October 3, 2005 – August 29, 2009

CNBC's On the Money, hosted by Carmen Wong Ulrich, is a television program that focuses primarily on personal finance, a programming departure from CNBC's "investor focused" weekday programming.

The program premiered on October 10, 2005 with Dylan Ratigan as host. Ratigan was replaced by Melissa Francis in 2007 and remained on CNBC's schedule until October 5, 2007. On September 27, it was announced that the program would be removed from the schedule effective October 10, due in part to low ratings, but the last edition was aired on October 5.

The program was completely revamped and relaunched on August 4, 2008 featuring new CNBC personality Carmen Wong Ulrich The program is now more of a financial advice show, similar to The Suze Orman Show.

On the Money was reduced from a daily 10pm program, to a single Saturday night airing (at 8pm ET) effective June 1, 2009. On August 25, 2009, CNBC announced that it would be canceling the program for the second time, shifting resources to their more successful documentary unit.

This program is not to be confused with the current program On the Money produced by CNBC for broadcast syndication. That program was retitled as On the Money with Maria Bartiromo in January 2013 from The Wall Street Journal Report after the end of the NBC/Dow Jones partnership deal, then cut down to the first part of the title upon Bartiromo's departure from CNBC in late November 2013 for Fox Business Network.

== About the program ==
In its original format, On the Money wrapped up the day's news from the worlds of business and everyday life, took a closer look at the money in every story. On the Money followed the money through everything from breaking news to politics, to pop culture, and sports.

The later weekly format was more of a financial advice show, with Carmen Wong Ulrich giving financial advice to viewers through phone calls and email, as is traditional with financial talk radio programming.

== History ==
On the Money, which originally started as a nightly business news program, premiered as "Hurricane Katrina: Crisis and Recovery" (which was hosted by Bill Griffeth) on August 29, 2005, replacing reruns of Late Night with Conan O'Brien. Five weeks later (October 5), the program rechristened as On the Money. Dylan Ratigan, who previously hosted Bullseye (which ended its run on March 11 of that year), was given the hosting duties for the latter as well.

On July 6, 2006, On the Money debuted a new look, which included the program's second logo, a new set, and new graphics. The entire graphics package was designed and redesigned in house at CNBC. Gary Keenan and by Felix Thoo of Creative Group, a post production house in NYC created some promotional work for a prior version of the graphics.

Ratigan, who was the original host of this program since October 3, 2005, left the program in December 2006 in preparation for his nightly hosting duties on Fast Money, which redebuted as a nightly series on January 8, 2007. He was replaced on that same night by Melissa Francis. The original version of On the Money ended its run on October 5, 2007.

On the Money was completely revamped and relaunched as a personal finance program August 4, 2008 with new host Carmen Wong Ulrich. The program is now more focused on providing specific personal finance information to its audience. Viewers can call in, text, or email Carmen with their problems, and each night, Carmen will go through them individually. On The Money also invites a variety of "Money Experts" to join Carmen on the program and assist her in finding the solutions to her viewers' problems and concerns.

== Segments ==
- The Insiders: This segment explained to the viewers what's really happening in each story.
- The CNBC Task Force: This segment showed viewers what they need to know about the major stories affecting them.
- The Ticker: This segment wrapped up the other news of the day.
- On the Money Extra: The day's trivia question was asked by the anchor before the commercial break, with the answer revealed after the commercial break.
- Money Dictionary: These are quick definitions of personal finance terms that come up during the program.
- Dollar Dilemma: This segment focuses on the audience calling, texting, or emailing Carmen to help solve their financial problems.
- What's Up With...: These segments decode the fine print and shed light on personal finance problems many people face.
- Buyer Beware: This segments focuses on the scams that may be out there and what consumers can do to protect themselves.
- Newswire: This segment has Carmen going through three separate news stories that can be beneficial or detrimental to her audience.

== CNBC Asia ==
Until March 23, 2007, On the Money was also broadcast at 12:00pm Singapore/Hong Kong/Taiwan time on CNBC Asia (Tuesdays to Fridays). Unlike the US (where it is first broadcast live at 7:00pm ET), the program was mostly seen on a tape delay. Now CNBC Asia only broadcasts "LIVE" Friday (US time) edition of On the Money on Saturdays morning at 7am (with DST)/8am (without DST) SIN/HK/TWN time.

== Production ==
On The Money is recorded at the Englewood Cliffs, NJ, studios at the Global Headquarters of CNBC, a national cable television network owned by NBC Universal and GE.

== See also ==
- Fast Money
