= Cover to Cover (2005 TV program) =

2005 American television program

- Presented by: Liz Claman
- Country of origin: United States
- Original language: English

Original release
- Network: CNBC

Cover to Cover was an American television program broadcast on the business channel CNBC in 2005. It dealt especially with criminology and trial cases. The anchor was Liz Claman. The program was produced by NBC News Productions and the Dateline NBC reporters.

== Episode subjects ==
- Brown's Chicken Massacre
- Robert Pickton
- Elián González
- Anna Slabaugh
- Birdie Joe Hoaks
- Robin Gilbert
- Chain of Command: The Road from 9/11 to Abu Ghraib (Seymour Hersh)
