= Brian Williams =

American journalist and television news anchor (born 1959)

- Williams at the 2026 Status Summit
- Born: Brian Douglas Williams; May 5, 1959 (age 67); Ridgewood, New Jersey, U.S.
- Years active: 1981–present
- Employer(s): CBS (1986–1993); NBC (1993–2021)
- Television: CBS News reporter (1986–1993); NBC News reporter (1993–2004); NBC Nightly News Saturday and/or Sunday anchor (1993–1999); NBC Nightly News anchor (2004–2015); MSNBC anchor (1996–2002, 2015–2021); The 11th Hour with Brian Williams anchor (2016–2021)
- Spouse: Jane Stoddard (m. 1986)
- Children: 2, including Allison
- Awards: 12 News & Documentary Emmy Awards; George Polk Award duPont-Columbia University Award; Walter Cronkite Award for Excellence in Journalism

Brian Douglas Williams (born May 5, 1959) is an American journalist and television news anchor. He was a correspondent for NBC Nightly News starting in 1993, before his promotion to anchor and managing editor of the broadcast in December 2004.

In February 2015, Williams was suspended by NBC News for six months for "misrepresent[ing] events which occurred while he was covering the Iraq War in 2003". Four months after the incident came to light, the network removed him from NBC Nightly News permanently and reassigned (demoted) him as the breaking news anchor for MSNBC.

In September 2016, Williams became the host of MSNBC's political news show, The 11th Hour. Williams announced in November 2021 that he would be leaving MSNBC and NBC News at the completion of his contract the following month, when he hosted his final episode of The 11th Hour.

== Early life and education ==
Born on May 5, 1959, in Ridgewood, New Jersey, Williams was raised in a "loud" Catholic home of largely Irish descent. He is the son of Dorothy May (née Pampel) (1918–1992) and Gordon Lewis Williams (1917–2010), who was an executive vice president of the National Retail Merchants Association, in New York. Williams is the youngest of four siblings.

He lived in Elmira, New York, for nine years before moving to Middletown Township, New Jersey, when he was in junior high school.

Williams graduated from Mater Dei High School, a Roman Catholic high school in the New Monmouth section of Middletown. While in high school, he was a volunteer firefighter for three years at the Middletown Township Fire Department. Williams was also the editorial editor for the school newspaper during his high school years. He suffered an accident during a football game that left him with a crooked nose. His first job was as a busboy at Perkins Restaurant & Bakery.

Following high school, Williams attended Brookdale Community College before transferring to the Catholic University of America and then George Washington University. He did not earn a degree, ultimately interning in the White House Press office during the administration of President Jimmy Carter. He later called leaving college one of his "great regrets".

== Career ==
=== Early broadcast career ===
Williams first worked in broadcasting in 1981 at KOAM-TV in Pittsburg, Kansas. The following year he covered news in the Washington, D.C., area at then-independent station WTTG, then worked in Philadelphia for WCAU, then owned and operated by CBS. Beginning in 1987 he broadcast in New York City at WCBS.

Williams joined NBC News in 1993, where he anchored the national Saturday Nightly News and rotated with the national "Sunday Nightly News" until 1999 and was chief White House correspondent. In the summer of 1996 he began serving as anchor and managing editor of The News with Brian Williams, broadcast on MSNBC and CNBC. Williams also served as primary substitute anchor on The NBC Nightly News with Tom Brokaw, and its Saturday anchor. He reported the accident and death of Diana, Princess of Wales.

=== Rise and ouster at NBC Nightly News ===
Williams became anchor of NBC Nightly News on December 2, 2004, replacing the retiring Tom Brokaw. In December 2004, when Williams took the helm, he had to apologize for saying there are "bigger problems" than newsroom diversity. NBC News President Neal Shapiro vowed to redouble the company's minority hiring efforts.

His coverage of Hurricane Katrina was widely praised, particularly "for venting his anger and frustration over the government's failure to act quickly to help the victims." The network was awarded a Peabody, the committee concluding that "Williams, and the entire staff of NBC Nightly News exemplified the highest levels of journalistic excellence." Williams accepted the award on behalf of the organization. NBC Nightly News also earned the George Polk Award and the duPont-Columbia University Award for its Katrina coverage. Vanity Fair called Williams' work on Katrina "Murrow-worthy" and reported that during the hurricane, he became "a nation's anchor". The New York Times characterized Williams' reporting of the hurricane as "a defining moment". However, Williams' statements about Hurricane Katrina and its aftermath were received with scrutiny. For example, Williams referred inconsistently to a suicide inside the New Orleans Superdome after Katrina. CNN reported in a 2005 television documentary that Williams said he was not a witness to the suicide: "We heard the story of a man killing himself, falling from the upper deck."

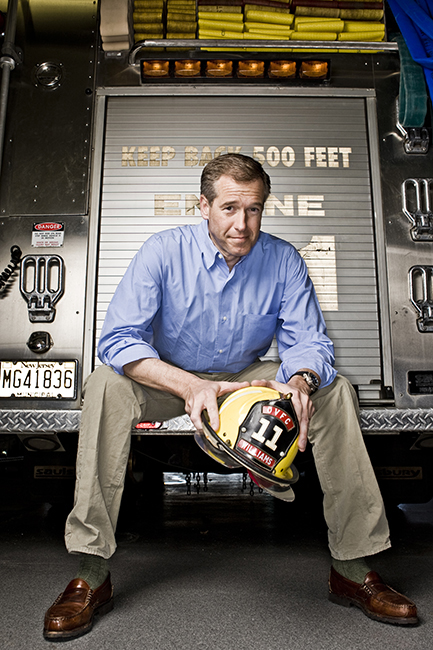
Williams in 2008

Appearing on The Daily Show in August 2006, Williams told host Jon Stewart that he was nearly hit the previous month by Katyusha rockets fired from Lebanon by Hezbollah while flying in an Israeli Air Force (IAF) Black Hawk helicopter: "Here's a view of rockets I have never seen, passing underneath us, 1,500 feet beneath us. And we've got the gunner doors on this thing, and I'm saying to the general, some four-star: 'It wouldn't take much for them to adjust the aim and try to do a ring toss right through our open doors, would it?' Anytime you want to cross over to the other side, baby, travel with me." The claim was drawn into question since there are no four-star generals in the Israel Defense Forces (IDF), Israeli helicopter doors are routinely closed during flights and the IAF's Black Hawks do not carry gunners. An IDF spokesman who was on the helicopter in question did confirm afterwards that there was Katyusha fire and, although the helicopter was not in danger, the "trajectory of the rockets was beneath us."

In 2007, Time magazine named Williams one of the 100 most influential people in the world.

In 2009, Williams was awarded the Walter Cronkite Award for Excellence in Journalism by Arizona State University. At the announcement of the award, Cronkite said he was one of Williams' "ardent admirers" and described him as a "fastidious newsman" who brought credit to the television news reporting profession.

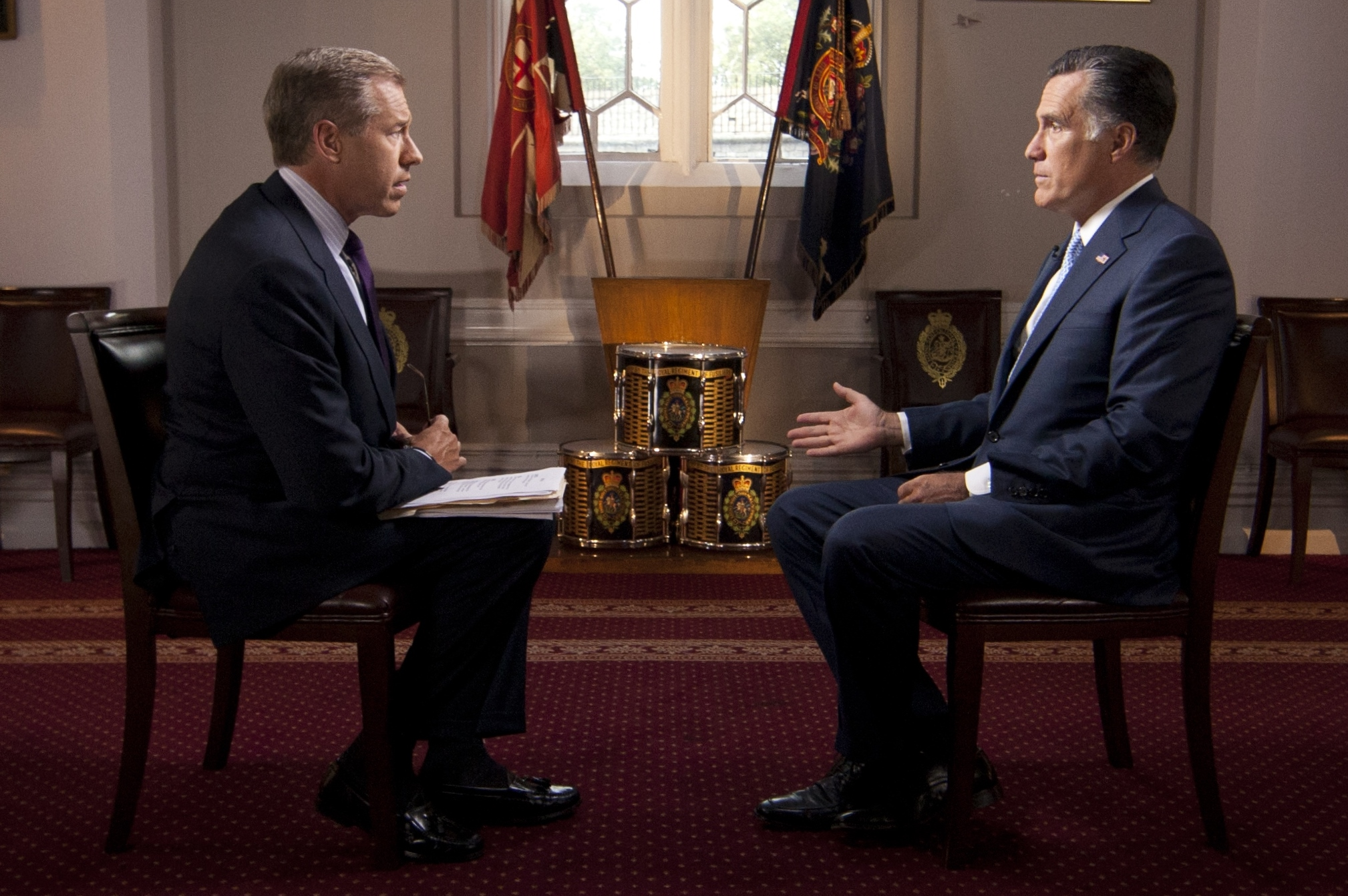
Williams interviewing presidential candidate Mitt Romney, July 25, 2012

While anchoring the Nightly News, Williams received 12 News & Documentary Emmy Awards. For "outstanding" work as anchor and managing editor of the Nightly News, he received one Emmy in 2006 (for Nightly News coverage of the 2005 Hurricane Katrina), two in 2007, one in 2009, two in 2010, one in 2011, one in 2013, and one in 2014. The 2014 Emmy honor was awarded to Nightly News for its coverage of a deadly series of tornadoes in Oklahoma, for which it also received the duPont-Columbia University Award.

Williams also received a 2012 Emmy for his interview program Rock Center and a 2013 Emmy for being one of the executive producers and editors of a documentary on the John F. Kennedy Presidential Library and Museum. He also shared a 2014 Emmy awarded for an NBC News Special on the Boston Marathon bombing.

Based on Nielsen ratings results from late 2008, Williams' news broadcast consistently had more viewers than its two main rivals, being ABC's World News Tonight and CBS Evening News. On this note, NBC Nightly News beat the other two network programs in the Nielsen ratings all but one week from late 2008 to late 2014.

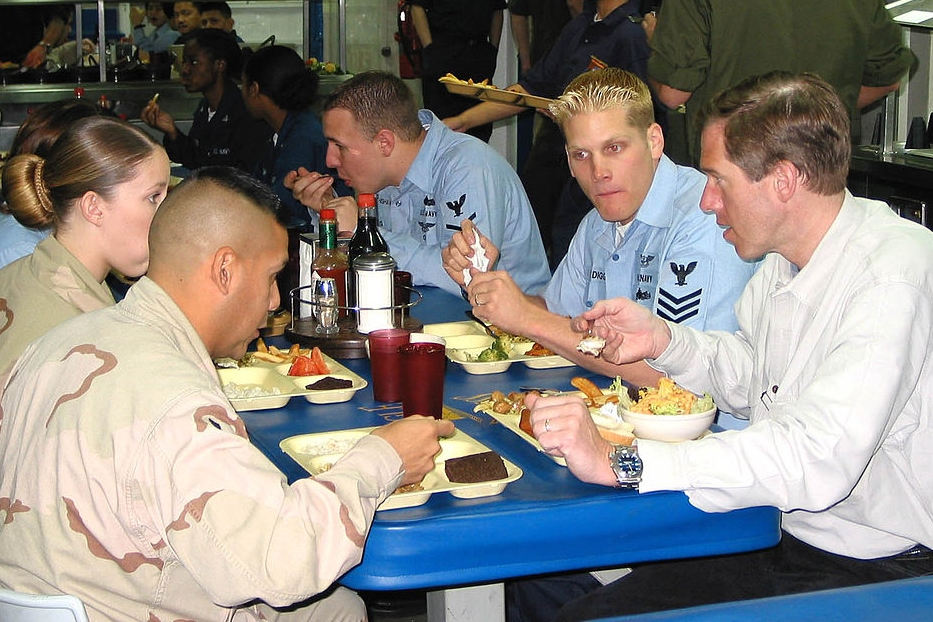
Williams aboard the amphibious assault ship USS Tarawa in the Persian Gulf, March 13, 2003

On February 4, 2015, Williams apologized for and recanted his then-disproven Iraq War story, which he had told on a Nightly News broadcast on January 30, 2015. He claimed that while he was flying in a military helicopter it had been "forced down after being hit by an RPG". Soon after it aired, Williams' story was criticized by Lance Reynolds, a flight engineer on board one of the three Chinook helicopters that had been attacked. Reynolds and other crew members said Williams had been aboard a separate group of helicopters from the helicopter that had been fired upon. Williams' helicopter was flying about half an hour behind and was forced to make an emergency landing because of a sandstorm rather than an attack. In a February 5, 2015 interview on CNN, the pilot of the Chinook in which Williams was traveling said that while the aircraft did not sustain RPG fire, it did indeed sustain small-arms fire and that the door gunners returned fire. Williams then claimed that several rounds missed him "by inches", which the Chinook crew chief denied. On February 10, 2015, NBC News President Deborah Turness suspended Williams without pay for six months from his position as Managing Editor and Anchor of the Nightly News broadcast for lying and for having misrepresented the Iraq incident. On June 18, 2015, he was demoted to breaking news anchor for MSNBC. At the time, his salary was $10 million a year, with a five-year contract signed in December 2014.

=== Rock Center with Brian Williams ===
On October 4, 2011, it was announced that Williams would be the host of Rock Center with Brian Williams, a news magazine program premiering on October 31, 2011, at 10:00 pm Eastern, replacing the canceled drama series The Playboy Club.

Named after the nickname of Rockefeller Center, the New York City landmark where NBC Radio City Studios are located, the program would become the first new NBC News program to launch in primetime in nearly two decades.

NBC cancelled Rock Center on May 10, 2013, due to low ratings. Additionally, the network was also having trouble finding a permanent time slot for the program. The last show aired on June 21, 2013.

Williams reportedly felt "insulted" by the program's cancellation.

=== Return to MSNBC ===
In September 2015, Williams returned to the air as MSNBC's chief anchor. News events that Williams had then covered for MSNBC include Pope Francis's trip to the United States; the 2015 Umpqua Community College shooting; and terrorist attacks in Paris, San Bernardino, Brussels, and Nice. In January 2016, Williams also added the role of chief elections anchor for MSNBC and subsequently debuted in the new role during coverage of the 2016 Iowa caucuses.

As part of his chief anchor duties, Williams anchored The 11th Hour with Brian Williams, which was a nightly news and politics wrap-up show. Williams, alongside co-anchors Rachel Maddow and Joy Reid and lead analyst Nicolle Wallace, led the network's coverage of the 2020 United States presidential election.

Williams announced on the November 9, 2021, episode of The 11th Hour with Brian Williams that he would be leaving NBC News and MSNBC at the expiration of his contract the following month, after five years hosting the show and 28 years with the company. His final episode as host was December 9, 2021.

=== Other activities ===
On November 13, 1999 and November 14, 1999, Williams served as host for NBC Sports' first live broadcasts of NASCAR races at the Homestead-Miami Speedway.

Williams frequently appeared on The Daily Show as a celebrity guest interviewed by Jon Stewart and in 2007, made regular cameos as a giant head sidekick looking on Jon Stewart and helping out with pronunciations of foreign names and occasionally other foreign affairs all beginning at the premiere of the new Daily Show set. He appeared on the Weekend Update segment of the season 32 premiere of Saturday Night Live, hosted by Dane Cook. He then hosted a season 33 episode on November 3, 2007, becoming the first, and still only, sitting network news anchor to host the show.

Williams appeared on Sesame Street in a 2007 episode, announcing the word of the day, "squid", in a special broadcast. Williams appeared on Sesame Street again in a 2008 episode, reporting for Sesame Street Nightly News about the "mine-itis" outbreak, becoming a victim. He was also the host of the 2009 Annual Sesame Workshop Benefit Gala. The following season, he appeared in another episode "Lying Is Bad".

On February 22, 2010, while covering the Winter Olympics, Williams did a skit with Brian Williams, the Canadian sportscaster of CTV Sports, on the CTV Olympic set. Some in the media dubbed this the new "Battle of the Brians", as NBC's Williams compared his own modest set to CTV's expensive Olympic studio.

Williams regularly appeared on Late Night with Jimmy Fallon, where he slow jams the news of the previous week as Fallon sings and reiterates what Williams says, with The Roots providing the musical backing. A mash-up video created by Fallon, where Williams appears to rap to hip-hop instrumentals, became popular within a few hours. Williams has also made numerous appearances on Late Show with David Letterman. During an appearance on July 26, 2011, he demonstrated a skilled vocal impersonation of TV personality Regis Philbin. He has also appeared on Late Night with Conan O'Brien, where he took part in numerous skits and interviews.

And then I pull off my mask, and I'm a lizard person, too. Blackout. End of episode.

— Williams on 30 Rock, proposing a new NBC show to Jack Donaghy

Williams made frequent guest appearances on NBC's television comedy 30 Rock, as a caricatured version of himself. In the episode "The Ones", he is seen at home receiving proposition calls meant for Tracy Jordan. In "Audition Day", he auditions to be a new TGS cast member. He also is seen once on the show taunting Tina Fey's character, Liz Lemon. In April 2012, on the West Coast installment of the 30 Rock season 6 live show, Williams portrayed a news anchor covering the Apollo 13 story.

Williams was the commencement speaker at Bates College in May 2005, The Catholic University of America in May 2004, Ohio State University in June 2008, and at the University of Notre Dame in 2010. In May 2012, he spoke at the George Washington University commencement on the National Mall. He was the commencement speaker for Elon University's graduating class of 2013, which included his son Douglas.

Williams also collaborated on the Encyclopedia of World History from Backpack Books published in 2003.

Williams has written for publications including The New York Times and Time magazine.

==== Later career ====
On October 17, 2024, Williams was announced as the host for 2024 election coverage for Amazon Prime Video.

Since 2026, he has hosted a podcast titled We're Back! With Brian Williams on Netflix.

== Personal life ==
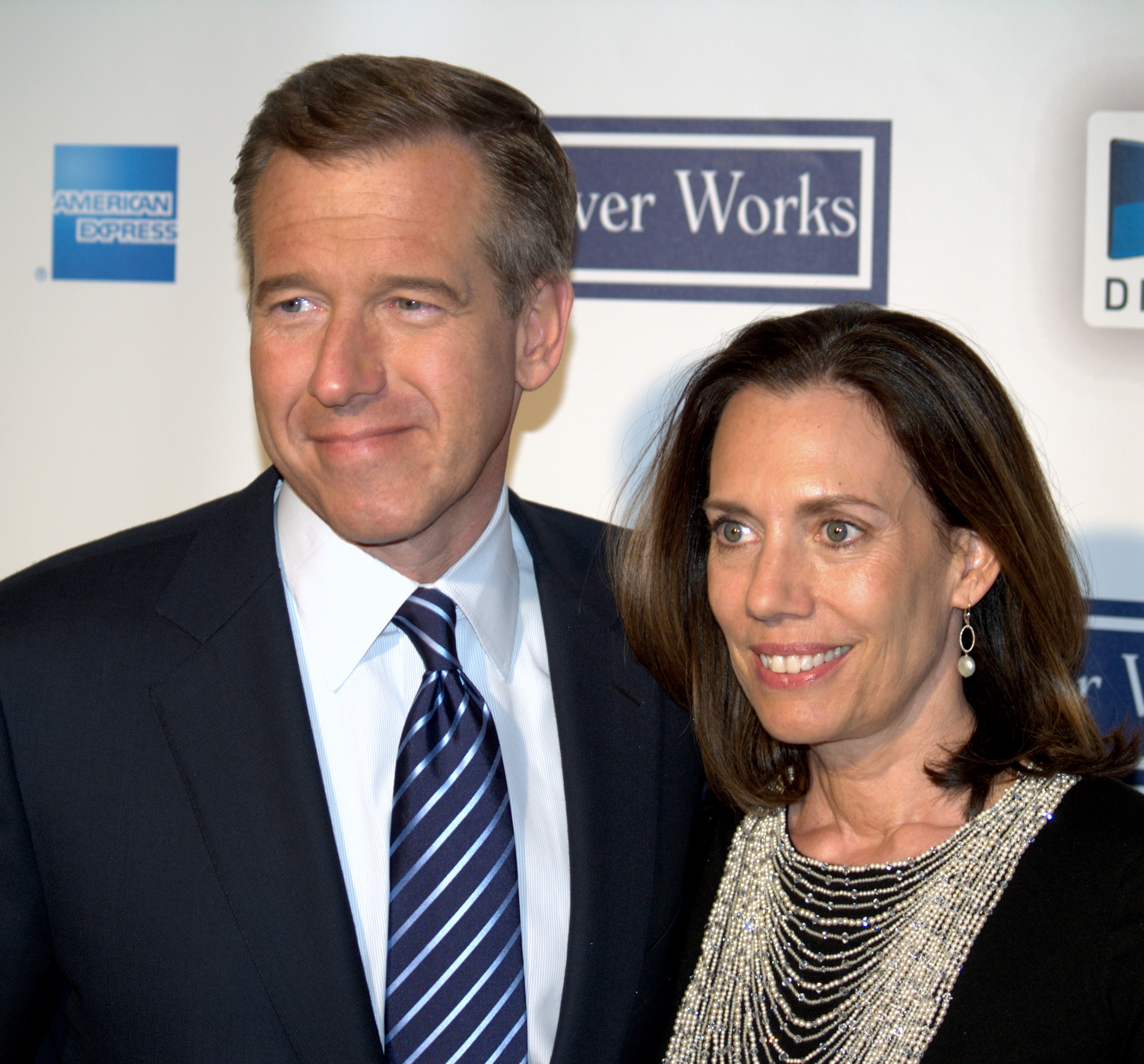
With his wife, Jane, in 2009

Williams married Jane Gillan Stoddard, at the First Presbyterian Church of New Canaan, Connecticut, on June 7, 1986. They have two children: Allison, an actress, and Doug, the WCBS-TV reporter and anchor and former late-night anchor of Geico SportsNite on SportsNet New York. Williams and his wife live in New Canaan, and own a beach house in Bay Head, New Jersey and a pied-à-terre in Midtown Manhattan.

From 2006 to 2015, Williams was a member of the board of directors of the Medal of Honor Foundation; he resigned days after his suspension from NBC.

== Honorary degrees ==
School	Date	Location	Degree	Ref.
Catholic University of America	15 May 2004	District of Columbia	Doctor of Humane Letters	
Bates College	30 May 2005	Maine	Doctor of Humane Letters	
Ohio State University	8 June 2008	Ohio	Doctor of Journalism	
University of Notre Dame	16 May 2010	Indiana	Doctor of Laws	
Fordham University	21 May 2011	New York	Doctor of Humane Letters	
George Washington University	2012	District of Columbia	Doctor of Humane Letters	

== Television ==
Year	Title	Role	First episode	Notes
2007	Saturday Night Live	Himself	Host	
2009–12	30 Rock	Himself	The Ones	
2013	Family Guy	Himself	"Space Cadet"	Voice only
2013	The Soup	Himself	Himself	

== Career timeline ==
- 1981: KOAM-TV
- 1982–1986: WTTG-TV correspondent
- 1985: Panorama host
- 1985–1987: WCAU-TV New Jersey correspondent
- 1987–1993: WCBS-TV anchor of weekday noon and weekend night newscasts; reporter
- 1993–2021: NBC News
- 1993–1994, 1996–2004: correspondent
- 1993–1999: NBC Nightly News weekend anchor
- 1994–1996: White House correspondent
- 1996–2004: MSNBC The News with Brian Williams anchor
- 2004–2015: NBC Nightly News anchor
- 2011–2013: Rock Center with Brian Williams host
- 2015: six-month suspension from NBC Nightly News for misrepresenting details of a helicopter incident from the Iraq War
- 2015–2021: MSNBC chief breaking news anchor
- 2016–2021: The 11th Hour with Brian Williams anchor
- 2024: election night coverage for Amazon Prime Video
- 2026–present: We're Back! With Brian Williams host

== See also ==
- List of journalists in New York City

Media offices
Preceded by Andrea Mitchell	Chief White House Correspondent of NBC News; 1994–1996	Succeeded by David Bloom
Preceded by Tom Brokaw	Weekday Anchor of NBC Nightly News; 2004–2015	Succeeded by Lester Holt
