= 2011 in British television =

This is a list of events that took place in 2011 related to British television.

== Events ==
=== January ===
Date	Event
1 January	Toonattik after six years leaves CITV along with Action Stations!, which closes down after five years of broadcast. New Year's Day also sees the final appearance of The Fluffy Club on Mini CITV.
1 January	Cable channel Bravo closes down after 25 years of broadcasting with some of its programmes moving over to Sky1. Its sister channel Bravo 2 also closes down.
5 January	Avon and Somerset Police ban ITN from attending a press conference convened to give updates on the Joanna Yeates case after a report on the previous day's ITV News criticised their handling of the investigation. The ban is subsequently lifted.
6 January	Samantha Womack is to leave her role in EastEnders as Ronnie Mitchell over the controversial baby swap plot.
9 January	EastEnders viewers have complained in record numbers about the soap's "hurtful", "unrealistic" and "exploitative" cot death storyline involving the character Ronnie Mitchell.
14 January	The S4C Authority confirms it has closed S4C2 due to budget cuts imposed on it by the Department of Culture, Media and Sport.
17 January	Barney Harwood becomes the new Blue Peter presenter taking over from Joel Defries.
25 January	Reporter Andy Gray is dropped by Sky Sports following sexist comments made by himself and fellow presenter Richard Keys against female official Sian Massey in footage recorded the previous Saturday. Keys resigns the following day, in support of his colleague.

=== February ===
Date	Event
1 February	The Sky HD swap is introduced giving HD channels more prominence. Sky also sees the launch of brand-new channel Sky Atlantic, and the Living channels are rebranded as Sky Living. Channel One closes down at 6 am, and is replaced on Freeview by Challenge.
2 February	John Nettles appears in his final ever episode of Midsomer Murders, having starred in a total of 81 episodes since the series was launched in 1997.
2 February	Former BBC executive Craig Oliver is appointed as Prime Minister David Cameron's Director of Communications.
4 February	The BBC apologises for remarks about Mexicans made on its Top Gear television programme but defends the original remarks as well.
14 February	Channel 5 reverts to its original name after almost a decade.
16 February	BBC One airs a special hour-long episode of its daytime soap Doctors to celebrate the series 2000th episode.
28 February	The ban on product placement in television programmes is lifted, allowing advertisers to pay for their goods to be seen on British TV. The first product to be displayed in this regard is a Nescafe coffee machine, which appears on This Morning. A year-long trial also begins allowing commercial television channels to show up to 12 minutes of adverts per hour during films and dramas, bringing them into line with soap operas where this is already permitted.

=== March ===
Date	Event
2 March	Rupert Murdoch's News Corporation agrees to sell Sky News to be in a position to buy BSkyB without a Competition Commission inquiry. News Corp receives approval to buy out BSkyB the following day.
16 March	Coleen Nolan announces her decision to quit ITV daytime panel show Loose Women after over 10 years as a panellist.
19 March	BBC Three host a major live TV event, Frankenstein's Wedding... Live in Leeds.
20 March	Gemma Collins makes her debut in the second series of ITV2 reality television series The Only Way Is Essex.
26 March	British terrestrial television premiere of the James Bond film Quantum of Solace on ITV1 starring Daniel Craig. The film previously aired on Sky Movies in 2010.
27 March	Sam Attwater and dancing partner Brianne Delcourt win the sixth series of Dancing on Ice.
30 March – 13 April	Analogue signals are switched off in the Nottingham and Sandy Heath areas.

=== April ===
Date	Event
4 April	Magdalen College, Oxford wins the 2010–11 series of University Challenge, beating the University of York 290–85.
6 April	Channel 5 officially announces that it has bought the rights to show former Channel 4 reality series Big Brother from August 2011.
6–20 April	Analogue signals are switched off in the Bromsgrove, Lark Stoke and Ridge Hill (Central and West) areas.
7 April	Top of the Pops returns to television in its former Thursday evening slot as BBC Four begins airing old episodes from 1976, the point at which the broadcaster's full archive of shows begins.
19 April	Helen Mirren apologises after swearing during an interview on the day's edition of BBC Breakfast.
27 April	Tim Anderson wins the 2011 series of MasterChef.
29 April	The royal wedding of Prince William and Catherine Middleton shown on BBC One and ITV. Audiences of around 24.5 million watch in the UK alone.

=== May ===
Date	Event
1 May	Brenda Blethyn makes her debut in the ITV crime drama Vera as DCI Vera Stanhope.
11 – 25 May	Analogue signals are switched off in the Darvel and Rosneath (HP and VP) areas.
5 May	It is confirmed that Simon Cowell and Cheryl Cole will leave their positions as judges on The X Factor to concentrate on the American version of the programme. Cole is later dropped from the US version of the series.
12 May	ITV axes the Scottish police drama Taggart after 28 years, citing poor viewing figures in other parts of the UK.
12 May	Dennis Tanner, played by Philip Lowrie, returns to Coronation Street, having last appeared in 1968. His break of 43 years is the longest of any actor in the soap's history.
14 May	Azerbaijan's Ell & Nikki win the 2011 Eurovision Song Contest (staged in Düsseldorf) with "Running Scared".
14 May	Dannii Minogue announces she will not be appearing on the next series of The X Factor.
19 May	A special edition of the BBC's political debate programme Question Time is recorded at Wormwood Scrubbs Prison in London.
19 May	BBC World News America presenter Matt Frei is recruited by Channel 4 News to become their Washington correspondent, while Newsnight correspondent Jackie Long will become Channel 4 News's social affairs editor. Cathy Newman will become the first new presenter to join the in-studio team at Channel 4 for 13 years.
24 May	Broadcast magazine reports that ITV is preparing to launch a new investigative series titled Exposure, thirteen years after it axed the award-winning World in Action.
25 May	It is announced that Jeff Stelling is to leave Countdown after two years to concentrate on Sky Sports.
30 May	After six and a half years, Emmerdale sees a new sequence to the opening titles of the series, with a new theme music, with new generic shots alongside a Range Rover driving through the woods, cuts sideways to a woman stroking a man's leg with her foot: a couple running upstairs in Home Farm, a dog in The Dingles' living room; then finally finishing on a new CGI image of the village, angled at Main Street which ends with the new logo fading on to the screen.
30 May	ITV confirms that Gary Barlow, Tulisa Contostavlos and Kelly Rowland will join Louis Walsh as judges for series 8 of The X Factor.

=== June ===
Date	Event
1–15 June	Analogue signals are switched off in the Craigkelly area.
4 June	Scottish singer Jai McDowall wins the fifth series of Britain's Got Talent.
6 June	The BBC announces that the national variations of BBC One Northern Ireland, BBC One Scotland and BBC One Wales will become available in high definition in 2012.
6 June	ITV children's gadget show Cool Stuff Collective is criticised by Ofcom for "product placement" over the way featured items are reviewed by the programme.
6 June	The Sun reports that the BBC's So You Think You Can Dance will not return for a third series.
9 June	Mandy Salter will be returning to EastEnders as Nicola Stapleton is set to reprise the role for the first time since 1994.
11 June	Matt Flint wins series two of So You Think You Can Dance.
13 June	BBC Two airs the controversial documentary Choosing to Die, a film presented by Terry Pratchett which examines the topic of assisted suicide.
13 June	The BBC announces that its landmark Television Centre is up for sale.
17 June	Viewers of the BBC News Channel claim to have been distracted when newsreaders Martine Croxall and Carrie Gracie appear on screen to read the morning's news wearing similar outfits that are an identical colour.
22 June	The last analogue television services are switched off in Scotland, making it the second part of the UK to have a fully digital service.
22 June	ITV recruits BBC political correspondent Laura Kuenssberg to be its new business editor. She will take up the role from September, and will also front editions of the Tonight programme.
30 June	ITV confirms that Coronation Street will return to its traditional 19:30 timeslot on a Wednesday evening from September 2012.

=== July ===
Date	Event
6–20 July	Analogue signals are switched off in the Sudbury area.
8 July	The BBC announces that Pam St. Clement is to leave EastEnders after 25 years.
10 July	ITV confirms it has sacked daytime presenters Kate Thornton and Zoe Tyler in a bid to boost flagging ratings for daytime show Loose Women.
13 July	Rupert Murdoch announces that News Corporation is withdrawing its proposal to take full control of the subscription television broadcaster BSkyB due to concerns over the phone hacking scandal.
17 July	Inventor Tom Pellereau wins the seventh series of The Apprentice, and a £250,000 investment from Lord Sugar, who will become his business partner in exchange for the investment.
July	UKTV does a deal with BSkyB to provide on-demand content available to Sky customers via Sky Anytime.

=== August ===
Date	Event
2 August	Really launches on Freeview.
3 August	ITV News hires former BBC and 5 News presenter Natasha Kaplinsky to cover for Nina Hossain while the latter is on maternity leave. She will present on London Tonight and national bulletins.
3–17 August	Analogue signals are switched off in the Belmont and Olivers Mount areas.
10–24 August	Analogue signals are switched off in the Chesterfield and Sheffield areas.
11 August	BBC One airs a special edition of the political discussion show Question Time following the recent outbreak of rioting.
15 August	Virgin Media agrees to sell its 50% stake in UKTV to Scripps Networks for £339m.
16 August	BBC Magazines agrees a £12m deal to sell the Radio Times – together with ten other titles – to Exponent, owner of thetrainline.com.
17–31 August	Analogue signals are switched off in the Waltham area.
18 August	Celebrity Big Brother 2011 launches on Channel 5 marking the first series of Celebrity Big Brother to air on the channel.
18 August	The BBC airs a special edition of its Crimewatch programme aimed at identifying people involved in the 2011 England riots.
25 August	Teesside comedian Patrick Monahan wins the live final of ITV's Show Me the Funny, in which stand-up comedians competed to win £100,000, a 12-date nationwide tour and a DVD release.
26 August	Channel 4 airs its last episode of Friends, "The One Where Paul's the Man" after 16 years.

=== September ===
Date	Event
4 September	E4 airs its last episode of Friends, The Last One after 16 years.
7–21 September	Analogue signals are switched off in the Fenton, Sutton Coldfield and Emley Moor areas.
8 September	Paddy Doherty wins Celebrity Big Brother 2011 and becomes Channel 5's first Celebrity Big Brother winner.
9 September	Big Brother 2011 launches on Channel 5 marking the first series of Big Brother to air on the channel.
9 September – 23 October	ITV airs coverage of the 2011 Rugby World Cup from New Zealand.
14 September	Cartoon Network launches in HD.
26 September	Jade Thompson wins Cycle 7 of Britain & Ireland's Next Top Model (formerly Britain's Next Top Model).
27 September	Labour Party leader Ed Miliband's keynote conference speech is blacked out for five-minute after all media communications are lost by a power outage at the conference centre.

=== October ===
Date	Event
4 October	Joanne Wheatley wins the second series of The Great British Bake Off.
6 October	BBC Director General Mark Thompson announces that BBC HD will close to be replaced by a high definition simulcast of BBC Two. This BBC Two HD will work much the same way as BBC One HD. This move allows the corporation to save £2.1 million, used to count towards their budget deficit following the freezing of the license fee and the additional financial responsibility of addition services.
14 October	CBeebies airs the final re-run of Numberjacks series 1. Re-runs of the second series continue until 2015.
15 October	Helen Flanagan, who plays Rosie Webster in Coronation Street, announces she is leaving the series after twelve years. She will film her final scenes at Christmas and be seen on screen until February 2012.
18 October	ITV plc buys the Channel Islands franchise Channel Television from the Yattendon Group plc.
22 October	Rugby player Phil Vickery wins the 2011 series of Celebrity MasterChef.
10, 12 October	High definition versions of Dave (10/10) and Watch (12/10) are launched by UKTV.
31 October	Channel 4 air the first episode of Top Boy, a four-part British crime drama series, written by Ronan Bennett and starring UK rappers Ashley Walters and Kano, about gang culture and drug dealing on a council estate in Hackney, East London. The series premiere is watched by 1.1 million viewers.

=== November ===
Date	Event
4 November	Jill Evans, a Welsh MEP is fined £575 after refusing to pay her TV licence fee in protest over changes to the Welsh-language channel S4C.
8 November	ITN confirms it has secured a five-year contract to resume production of 5 News from early 2012. The broadcaster lost the programme to Sky News in 2005. Part of the new deal will see the 7:00 pm bulletin move to an earlier 6:30 pm timeslot.
9–23 November	Analogue signals are switched off from the Tacolneston transmitting station in Norfolk.
11 November	Aaron Allard-Morgan wins Big Brother 2011 and becomes Channel 5's first Big Brother winner.
13 November	TV bosses are forced to apologise after the results of a phone vote for the previous evening's The X Factor appeared online before the lines had closed. The episode was also delayed for fifteen minutes by a technical glitch.
14 November	Coronation Street becomes the first prime time British television programme to use product placement after signing a deal with Nationwide Building Society. A Nationwide cash machine is seen in the episode.
16 November	Nick Hewer, one of Alan Sugar's advisers on The Apprentice is revealed as the latest host of Countdown. He takes over from outgoing presenter Jeff Stelling from January 2012.
19 November	Attorney General Dominic Grieve QC seeks leave to prosecute Sky News for contempt of court over its reporting of the kidnapping of Paul and Rachel Chandler in the Seychelles after the channel allegedly breached an injunction preventing the disclosure of the couple's welfare prior to their release in 2010.

=== December ===
Date	Event
1 December	The BBC has received over 31,000 complaints about comments made by Jeremy Clarkson on the previous evening's The One Show in which he said he would "execute" striking public sector workers.
3 December	Pop star Dougie Poynter wins the eleventh series of I'm a Celebrity...Get Me Out of Here!.
7 December	Matthew Wright, host of The Wright Stuff, apologises for remarks he made on 6 December edition of the show concerning a murder in the Western Isles.
7 December	A scheduled BBC Newsnight investigation which would have exposed the Jimmy Savile sexual abuse scandal two months after the presenter's death is cancelled. The BBC broadcasts two tributes to Savile over Christmas and it will not be until an October 2012 ITV documentary that the allegations become public.
10 December	After 25 years Casualty airs its last episode to be filmed in Bristol. Subsequent episodes are filmed in Cardiff.
11 December	Little Mix (originally named Rhythmix) win the eighth series of The X Factor, making them the first group to emerge as winners.
11 December	Two missing episodes from the 1960s Doctor Who series Air Lock and The Underwater Menace – Episode 2 are returned to the BBC Archives by the private collector Terry Burnett.
12 December	Student Zara Brownlees wins the second series of Young Apprentice.
15 December	Ash Mair wins the fourth series of MasterChef: The Professionals.
17 December	McFly drummer Harry Judd and his dancing partner Aliona Vilani win the ninth series of Strictly Come Dancing.
22 December	Cyclist Mark Cavendish is named this year's BBC Sports Personality of the Year.

== Debuts ==
=== BBC ===
Date	Debut	Channel
1 January	Eric and Ernie	BBC Two
1 January	The Magicians	BBC One
2 January	Zen	BBC One
3 January	Stargazing Live	BBC Two
3 January	The Bear Family & Me	BBC Two
4 January	Sun, Sex and Suspicious Parents	BBC Three
8 January	Match of the Day Kickabout	CBBC
8 January	Dick and Dom's Funny Business	CBBC
10 January	Episodes	BBC Two
13 January	Human Planet	BBC One
14 January	Sadie J	CBBC
14 January	Fast and Loose	BBC Two
17 January	Perfection	BBC Two
19 January	Hattie	BBC Four
25 January	How TV Ruined Your Life	BBC Two
31 January	Rastamouse	CBeebies
3 February	The Ultra Zionists	BBC Two
4 February	The Lock Up	BBC Three
5 February	All Over the Place	CBBC
7 February	Outcasts	BBC One
9 February	Madagascar	BBC Two
12 February	Secret Fortune	BBC One
14 February	The Sparticle Mystery	CBBC
20 February	South Riding	BBC One
21 February	Mrs. Brown's Boys	BBC One
22 February	Silk	BBC One
22 February	Junior Doctors: Your Life in Their Hands	BBC Three
6 March	Wonders of the Universe	BBC Two
11 March	The British at Work	BBC Two
14 March	Twenty Twelve	BBC Four
19 March	Christopher and His Kind	BBC Two
22 March	White Van Man	BBC Three
29 March	See You in Court	BBC One
31 March	Women in Love	BBC Four
4 April	Justice	BBC One
5 April	Candy Cabs	BBC One
6 April	The Crimson Petal and the White	BBC Two
23 April	Don't Scare the Hare	BBC One
24 April	United	BBC Two
1 May	Exile	BBC One
4 May	Two Greedy Italians	BBC Two
5 May	The Shadow Line	BBC Two
8 May	Atlantis: End of a World, Birth of a Legend	BBC One
8 May	The Field of Blood	BBC One
16 May	The Street That Cut Everything	BBC One
27 May	Paul Merton's Birth of Hollywood	BBC Two
30 May	Horrible Histories: Gory Games	CBBC
6 June	World's Craziest Fools	BBC Three
8 June	In with the Flynns	BBC One
18 June	Lee Mack's All Star Cast	BBC One
4 July	Pointless Celebrities	BBC One
5 July	Restoration Home	BBC Two
12 July	The Night Watch	BBC Two
14 July	The Pranker	BBC Three
19 July	The Hour	BBC Two
24 July	Sugartown	BBC One
20 August	Epic Win	BBC One
4 September	World's Most Dangerous Roads	BBC Two
13 September	The Body Farm	BBC One
21 September	The Fades	BBC Three
26 September	Home Cooking Made Easy	BBC Two
1 October	I Want My Own Room	BBC Two
3 October	Dirty Tricks of the Tradesmen	BBC One
5 October	All Roads Lead Home	BBC Two
6 October	Hidden	BBC One
19 October	Holy Flying Circus	BBC Four
25 October	Death in Paradise	BBC One
10 November	Life's Too Short	BBC One
23 November	That's Britain!	BBC One
26 December	The Royal Bodyguard	BBC One

=== ITV ===
Date	Debut	Channel
7 January	Penn & Teller: Fool Us	ITV
9 January	That Sunday Night Show	ITV
13 January	Kidnap and Ransom	ITV
3 February	Marchlands	ITV
10 March	Monroe	ITV
22 March	Jean-Claude Van Damme: Behind Closed Doors	ITV4
28 March	The Dales	ITV
16 April	Sing If You Can	ITV
21 April	Long Lost Family	ITV
1 May	Vera	ITV
2 May	Case Sensitive	ITV
29 May	Scott & Bailey	ITV
6 June	Secret Dealers	ITV
6 June	Injustice	ITV
10 June	Love Your Garden	ITV
17 July	Born To Shine	ITV
3 September	Red or Black?	ITV
3 September	The Jonathan Ross Show	ITV
4 September	Appropriate Adult	ITV
26 September	There's No Taste Like Home	ITV
11 October	High Stakes	ITV
22 November	The Adventurer's Guide To Britain	ITV
11 December	Text Santa	ITV
18 December	Just Henry	ITV

=== Channel 4 ===
Date	Debut	Channel
2 January	Famous and Fearless	Channel 4
4 January	David Walliams' Awfully Good	Channel 4
5 January	Britain's Fattest Man	Channel 4
16 January	Comics Choice	Channel 4
18 January	Big Fat Gypsy Weddings	Channel 4
19 January	The Joy of Teen Sex	Channel 4
20 January	10 O'Clock Live	Channel 4
23 January	Alys	S4C
6 February	The Promise	Channel 4
6 February	The People's Supermarket	Channel 4
25 February	Friday Night Dinner	Channel 4
2 March	Jamie's Dream School	Channel 4
28 March	Fern	Channel 4
17 April	The Hotel	Channel 4
9 May	Made in Chelsea	E4
9 May	The Secret History of Eurovision	More4
11 May	24 Hours in A&E	Channel 4
24 May	Four Rooms	Channel 4
17 June	King Of...	Channel 4
27 June	Sirens	Channel 4
27 July	Beaver Falls	E4
21 September	Fresh Meat	Channel 4
3 October	Random Acts	Channel 4
4 October	Mary Queen of Frocks	Channel 4
14 October	The Hunt for Tony Blair	Channel 4
31 October	Top Boy	Channel 4
4 December	Black Mirror	Channel 4
12 December	Christmas Coach Trip	Channel 4

=== Five/Channel 5 ===
Date	Debut	Channel
14 February	OK! TV	Channel 5
18 August	Celebrity Big Brother	Channel 5
9 September	Big Brother	Channel 5
3 October	Celebrity Wish List	Channel 5

=== Other channels ===
Date	Debut	Channel
5 January	Louie Spence's Showbusiness	Sky1
7 February	Bedlam	Sky Living
10 February	3Mad Dogs	Sky1
21 February	Ross Kemp: Extreme World	Sky1
27 February	Mud Men	History
31 March	The Runaway	Sky1
18 April	Small Potatoes	CBeebies
18 April	Game of Thrones	Sky Atlantic
2 May	The Amazing World of Gumball	Cartoon Network
19 May	Al Murray's Compete for the Meat	Dave
24 May	Geordie Shore	MTV
30 May	Alexander Armstrong's Big Ask	Dave
17 June	Wall of Fame	Sky1
4 August	Trollied	Sky1
24 August	Mount Pleasant	Sky1
19 September	This is Jinsy	Sky Atlantic
6 September	Jelly Jamm	Cartoonito
22 September	Jo Brand's Big Splash	Dave
31 October	Matt Hatter Chronicles	Nicktoons & CITV
7 November	The Looney Tunes Show	Boomerang
23 November	The Café	Sky1
23 November	The Devil's Dinner Party	Sky Atlantic

== Channels ==
=== New channels ===
Date	Channel
11 January	ITV +1 (ITV1 +1/STV +1/UTV +1)
1 February	Sky Atlantic
1 February	Sky Atlantic HD
1 February	MTV Music
7 April	Sony Entertainment Television
7 April	Sony Entertainment Television +1
15 June	Argos TV
10 October	Dave HD
12 October	Watch HD
1 November	PBS UK

=== Defunct channels ===
Date	Channel
1 January	Bravo
1 January	Bravo +1
1 January	Bravo 2
1 January	Challenge Jackpot
1 February	Channel One
1 February	Channel One +1
1 February	MTV Shows
7 April	Film 24
23 May	TeleG

=== Rebranded channels ===
Date	Old Name	New Name
1 January	Rocks TV	Gems TV Extra
1 February	Living	Sky Living
1 February	Living +1	Sky Living +1
1 February	Living HD	Sky Living HD
1 February	Livingit	Sky Livingit
1 February	Livingit +1	Sky Livingit +1
1 February	Living Loves	Sky Living Loves
1 February	Sky Box Office	Sky Movies Box Office
14 February	Five	Channel 5
28 February	Sky3	Pick TV
28 February	Sky3 +1	Pick TV +1
7 March	Fiver	5*
7 March	Fiver +1	5* +1
7 March	Five USA	5USA
7 March	Five USA +1	5USA +1
26 April	Lava	Greatest Hits TV
7 May	Playhouse Disney	Disney Junior
7 May	Playhouse Disney +	Disney Junior +

== Television shows ==
=== Changes of network affiliation ===
Show	Moved from	Moved to
The Ricky Gervais Show (First Run Rights)	Channel 4	E4
Big Brother	Channel 4	Channel 5
Celebrity Big Brother	Channel 4	Channel 5
NewsRadio	Comedy Central	Sony Entertainment Television
Primeval	ITV	Watch
Beyblade: Metal Fusion	Channel 5	CITV
TNA Impact!	Bravo	Challenge
Top of the Pops 2	Yesterday	Dave
Art Attack	CITV	Disney Junior
Grizzly Tales for Gruesome Kids	CITV	Nickelodeon
Winx Club	POP	Nickelodeon
Glee	E4	Sky1
The Weakest Link (Daytime version)	BBC One	BBC Two
QI	BBC One	BBC Two
Pointless	BBC Two	BBC One
Friends	Channel 4 & E4	Comedy Central

=== Returning this year after a break of one year or longer ===
Programme	Date(s) of original removal	Original channel(s)	Date of return	New channel(s)
Art Attack	13 July 2007	CITV	6 June 2011	Disney Junior
Born to Be Different	2004; 13 September 2007; 5 May 2009	Channel 4	9 June 2011	N/A (Same channel as original)
Celebrity Big Brother	29 January 2010	Channel 4	18 August 2011	Channel 5
Big Brother	10 September 2010	Channel 4	9 September 2011	Channel 5
Shipwrecked	19 December 2001; 10 May 2009	Channel 4	23 October 2011	E4
Young Dracula	8 February 2008	CBBC	31 October 2011	N/A (Same channel as original)
Absolutely Fabulous	7 November 1996; 25 December 2004	BBC One	25 December 2011	N/A (Same channel as original)

== Continuing television shows ==
=== 1920s ===
Programme	Date
BBC Wimbledon	1927–1939, 1946–2019, 2021–present

=== 1930s ===
Programme	Date
Trooping the Colour	1937–1939, 1946–2019, 2023–present
The Boat Race	1938–1939, 1946–2019, 2021–present

=== 1950s ===
Programme	Date
Panorama	1953–present
The Sky at Night	1957–present
Blue Peter	1958–present

=== 1960s ===
Programme	Date
Coronation Street	1960–present
Points of View	1961–present
Songs of Praise	1961–present
University Challenge	1962–1987, 1994–present
Doctor Who	1963–1989, 1996, 2005–present
Top of the Pops	1964–present
Match of the Day	1964–present
The Money Programme	1966–present

=== 1970s ===
Programme	Date
Question of Sport	1970–present
Film...	1971–present
Upstairs, Downstairs	1971–1975, 2010–2012
Emmerdale	1972–present
Mastermind	1972–present
Newsround	1972–present
Arena	1975–present
One Man and His Dog	1976–present
ITV News at 6:30	1976–present
Top Gear	1977–present
Ski Sunday	1978–present
Antiques Roadshow	1979–present
Question Time	1979–present

=== 1980s ===
Programme	Date
Children in Need	1980–present
Timewatch	1982–present
Taggart	1983–2011
Channel 4 Racing	1984–2016
Thomas & Friends	1984–present
EastEnders	1985–present
Neighbours	1985–present
Comic Relief	1985–present
Watchdog	1985–present
Casualty	1986–present
Fireman Sam	1987–1994, 2005–2013
This Morning	1988–present
Home and Away	1988–present
Red Dwarf	1988–1999, 2009, 2012–present
Agatha Christie's Poirot	1989–2013
The Simpsons	1989–present

=== 1990s ===
Programme	Date
Have I Got News for You	1990–present
MasterChef	1990–2001, 2005–present
BBC World News	1991–present
Meridian Tonight	1993–present
Time Team	1994–2013
Junior MasterChef	1994, 2010–present
The National Lottery Draws	1994–2017
Top of the Pops 2	1994–present
Hollyoaks	1995–present
Soccer AM	1995–present
Never Mind the Buzzcocks	1996–2015
Silent Witness	1996–present
Midsomer Murders	1997–present
Bob the Builder	1998–present
Who Wants to Be a Millionaire?	1998–2014
British Soap Awards	1999–2019, 2022–present
DIY SOS	1999–present
G@mers	1999–2006, 2010–present
Holby City	1999–2022
Loose Women	1999–present
Newsnight Scotland	1999–2014
Tonight	1999–present

=== 2000s ===
Programme	Date
2000
Bargain Hunt	2000–present
BBC Breakfast	2000–present
Grizzly Tales for Gruesome Kids	2000–2006, 2011–2012
Big Brother	2000–2018
Click	2000–present
Doctors	2000–present
My Family	2000–2011
A Place in the Sun	2000–present
Shipwrecked	2000–2002, 2006–2009, 2011–2012
The Unforgettable	2000–present
Unreported World	2000–present
Waking the Dead	2000–2011
The Weakest Link	2000–2012, 2017–present
The Wright Stuff	2000–2018
2001
Celebrity Big Brother	2001–2002, 2005–2007, 2009–present
BBC South East Today	2001–present
Football Focus	2001–present
Real Crime	2001–present
Rogue Traders	2001–present
Two Pints of Lager and a Packet of Crisps	2001–2011
Property Ladder	2001–present
2002
Cash in the Attic	2002–present
Escape to the Country	2002–present
Fifth Gear	2002–present
Flog It!	2002–present
Foyle's War	2002–2015
Harry Hill's TV Burp	2002–2012
High Hopes	2002–present
I'm a Celebrity...Get Me Out of Here!	2002–present
In It to Win It	2002–present
Inside Out	2002–present
Outtake TV	2002–present
Saturday Kitchen	2002–present
Serious	2002–present
Spooks	2002–2011
River City	2002–2026
Sport Relief	2002–present
The Story Makers	2002–present
Tikkabilla	2002–present
2003
Celebrity Mastermind	2003–present
Daily Politics	2003–present
Eggheads	2003–present
Extraordinary People	2003–present
Grumpy Old Men	2003–present
Homes Under the Hammer	2003–present
New Tricks	2003–2015
Peep Show	2003–2015
QI	2003–present
The Politics Show	2003–present
The Royal	2003–2011
This Week	2003–present
Traffic Cops	2003–present
2004
10 Years Younger	2004–present
60 Minute Makeover	2004–present
Agatha Christie's Marple	2004–2013
The Big Fat Quiz of the Year	2004–present
Car Booty	2004–present
The Culture Show	2004–present
Doc Martin	2004–2019
Football First	2004–present
Funky Valley	2004–present
The Gadget Show	2004–present
Haunted Homes	2004–present
Hustle	2004–2012
Jimmy's Farm	2004–present
Live at the Apollo	2004–present
Match of the Day 2	2004–present
NewsWatch	2004–present
Peppa Pig	2004–present
Shameless	2004–2013
Strictly Come Dancing	2004–present
Strictly Come Dancing: It Takes Two	2004–present
Supernanny	2004–2008, 2010–2012
Who Do You Think You Are?	2004–present
The X Factor	2004–2018
2005
8 out of 10 Cats	2005–present
The Adventure Show	2005–present
The Andrew Marr Show	2005–present
The Apprentice	2005–present
The Biggest Loser	2005–present
Britain and Ireland's Next Top Model	2005–2013
Coach Trip	2005–2006, 2009–present
Coast	2005–present
Come Dine with Me	2005–present
It's Me or the Dog	2005–2012
Deal or No Deal	2005–2016
Doctor Who Confidential	2005–2011
Dragons' Den	2005–present
The F Word	2005–2010
Fifi and the Flowertots	2005–present
The Hotel Inspector	2005–present
Ideal	2005–2011
The Jeremy Kyle Show	2005–present
Ladette to Lady	2005–present
Missing Live	2005–present
Mock the Week	2005–present
Quizmania	2005–present
Springwatch	2005–present
The Thick of It	2005–2012
Ukwia	2005–present
2006
The Album Chart Show	2006–present
Animal Spies!	2006–present
The Apprentice: You're Fired!	2006–present
Banged Up Abroad	2006–2013
Charlie Brooker's Screenwipe	2006–present
Codex	2006–present
...Cooks!	2006–present
Cricket AM	2006–present
Dancing on Ice	2006–2014)
Dickinson's Real Deal	2006–present
Don't Get Done, Get Dom	2006–present
Fonejacker	2006–2008
Freshly Squeezed	2006–2012
Ghosthunting With...	2006–present
How to Look Good Naked
The IT Crowd	2006–2013
The Large Family	2006–present
Lead Balloon	2006–2011
Lewis	2006–2015
Little Princess	2006–present
Mama Mirabelle's Home Movies	2006–present
That Mitchell and Webb Look	2006–present
Monkey Life	2006–present
Most Annoying People	2006–present
Numberjacks	2006–2009
The One Show	2006–present
People & Power	2006–present
Peschardt's People	2006–present
The Real Hustle	2006–present
Secret Millionaire	2006–present
The Slammer	2006–2015
Soccer Aid	2006–present
Something for the Weekend	2006–2012
Torchwood	2006–2011
Waterloo Road	2006–2015, 2023–present
Wild at Heart	2006–2012
World Business	2006–2011
2007
The Alan Titchmarsh Show	2007–2014
The Armstrong and Miller Show	2007–2010
Benidorm	2007–present
The Big Questions	2007–present
Britain's Best Dish	2007–2011
Britain's Got Talent	2007–present
Coming of Age	2007–2011
Daybreak Scotland	2007–2012
Diddy Dick and Dom	2007–present
Don't Tell the Bride	2007–present
Embarrassing Bodies	2007–present
Escape from Scorpion Island	2007–present
Game60	2007–present
The Graham Norton Show	2007–present
Harry & Paul	2007–present
Heir Hunters	2007–present
Helicopter Heroes	2007–present
Inside Sport	2007–present
Inspector George Gently	2007–present
An Island Parish	2007–present
Jeff Randall Live	2007–present
London Ink	2007–present
M.I. High	2007–2011
Mary Queen of Shops	2007–present
Mister Maker	2007–present
Outnumbered	2007–2014
Postcode Challenge	2007–present
Primeval	2007–2011
Rapal	2007–present
The Real MacKay	2007–present
Real Rescues	2007–present
The Sarah Jane Adventures	2007–2011
Secret Diary of a Call Girl	2007–2011
Shrink Rap	2007–present
Skins	2007–present
Trapped	2007–present
The Tudors	2007–2011
Wanted Down Under	2007–present
What the Dickens	2007–present
Who Dares Wins	2007–present
Would I Lie To You?	2007–present
2008
An Là	2008–present
Are You an Egghead?	2008–present
Argumental	2008–present
Basil's Swap Shop	2008–present
Battle of the Brains	2008–present
Being Human	2008–present
Big & Small	2008–present
Bizarre ER	2008–present
CCTV Cities	2008–present
Celebrity Juice	2008–present
Chinese Food Made Easy	2008–present
Chop Socky Chooks	2008–present
Chuggington	2008–present
Country House Rescue	2008–present
Dani's House	2008–present
The Family	2008–present
Famous 5: On the Case	2008–present
Gimme a Break	2008–present
The Hot Desk	2008–present
House Guest	2008–present
The Inbetweeners	2008–present
It Pays to Watch!	2008–present
Kerwhizz	2008–2009, 2011
Lark Rise to Candleford	2008–2011
The Live Desk	2008–present
Lunch Monkeys	2008–2011
Marvo the Wonder Chicken	2008–present
Merlin	2008–2012
Nightwatch with Steve Scott	2008–present
Only Connect	2008–present
Police Interceptors	2008–present
Put Your Money Where Your Mouth Is	2008–2011
Richard Hammond's Engineering Connections	2008–present
Rory and Paddy's Great British Adventure	2008–present
Rubbernecker	2008–present
Rude Tube	2008–present
Scallywagga	2008–present
Seachd Là	2008–present
Sesame Tree	2008–present
Snog Marry Avoid?	2008–2013
Supersize vs Superskinny	2008–2014
The Supersizers...	2008–present
UK Border Force	2008–present
Unbreakable	2008–present
Wallander	2008–2016
Wogan's Perfect Recall	2008–present
The World's Strictest Parents	2008–present
2009
Alan Carr: Chatty Man	2009–2016
Angelina Ballerina: The Next Steps	2009–present
Bang Goes the Theory	2009–2014
Brain Box	2009–2011
Campus	2009–2011
Cast Offs	2009–present
Chris Moyles' Quiz Night	2009–present
Copycats	2009–present
Countrywise	2009–present
Cowboy Trap	2009–present
Crash	2009–present
The Chase	2009–present
The Cube	2009–2015
Dating in the Dark	2009–2011
Ed and Oucho's Excellent Inventions	2009–present
Fern Britton Meets...	2009–present
Film Xtra	2009–2011
The Football League Show	2009–2015
Four Weddings	2009–present
Garrow's Law	2009–2011
Getting On	2009–2012
Got to Dance	2009–2014
Grow Your Own Drugs	2009–present
Heston's Feasts	2009–present
Horrible Histories	2009–present
The Hour	2009–present
How the Other Half Live	2009–present
I Can Cook	2009–present
The Impressions Show with Culshaw and Stephenson	2009–present
Inside Nature's Giants	2009–present
Katie	2009–present
Land Girls	2009–2011
Law & Order: UK	2009–2014
The Legend of Dick and Dom	2009–2011
Let's Dance for Comic Relief	2009–present
Life of Riley	2009–2011
Little Howard's Big Question	2009–present
Live from Studio Five	2009–2011
Michael McIntyre's Comedy Roadshow	2009–present
Miranda	2009–2015
Misfits	2009–2013
Moving On	2009–present
Newswipe with Charlie Brooker	2009–present
The Old Guys	2009–present
Paradise Cafe	2009–2011
Peter Andre: The Next Chapter	2009–2013
PhoneShop	2009–2013
Piers Morgan's Life Stories	2009–present
Pointless	2009–present
Psychoville	2009–2011
A Question of Genius	2009–present
Rip Off Britain	2009–present
Russell Howard's Good News	2009–2015
Scoop	2009–present
Sea Patrol UK	2009–present
Sport Nation	2009–present
Stewart Lee's Comedy Vehicle	2009–2016
Strictly Money	2009–2011
STV News at Six	2009–present
Timmy Time	2009–present
Tonight's the Night	2009–present
Total Wipeout	2009–2012
Trusadh	2009–present
Ty Pennington's Great British Adventure	2009–present
Undercover Boss	2009–present
Walk on the Wild Side	2009–present
We Need Answers	2009–present
Whitechapel	2009–2013
You Have Been Watching	2009–present
You're Nicked!	2009–present
Young, Dumb and Living Off Mum	2009–2011

=== 2010s ===
Programme	Date
71 Degrees North	2010–2011
Accused	2010–2012
Ant & Dec's Push the Button	2010–2011
Ask Rhod Gilbert	2010–2011
Being... N-Dubz	2010–2011
Being Victor	2010–present
Come Fly with Me	2010–2011
A Comedy Roast	2010–2011
Celebrity Coach Trip	2010–2012, 2019–present
Dave's One Night Stand	2010–2012
Daybreak	2010–2014
DCI Banks	2010–2016
Dirty Sexy Funny	2010–present
Downton Abbey	2010–2015
EastEnders: E20	2010–2011
Eddie Stobart: Trucks & Trailers	2010–2014
Facejacker	2010–present
Frank Skinner's Opinionated	2010–present
Gordon's Great Escape	2010–2011
The Great British Bake Off	2010–present
Great British Railway Journeys	2010–present
Him & Her	2010–2013
Hotter Than My Daughter	2010–2011
An Idiot Abroad	2010–2012
James May's Man Lab	2010–2013
Junior Apprentice	2010–present
Lip Service	2010–2013
Late Kick Off	2010–present
A League of Their Own	2010–present
Lee Nelson's Well Good Show	2010–present
Little Crackers	2010–present
Lorraine	2010–present
Luther	2010–present
The Million Pound Drop	2010–2015
The Nightshift	2010–present
Odd One In	2010–present
The Only Way Is Essex	2010–present
Paul O'Grady Live	2010–2011
Pen Talar	2010–present
Penelope Princess of Pets	2010–present
Pete versus Life	2010–2011
Pocket tv	2010–present
Popstar to Operastar	2010–2011
Rev.	2010–2014
Richard Bacon's Beer & Pizza Club	2010–2011
The Rob Brydon Show	2010–2012
Rock and Chips	2010–2011
Roger & Val Have Just Got In	2010–2012
The Scheme	2010–2011
Scream! If You Know the Answer	2010–2012
Sherlock	2010–present
So You Think You Can Dance	2010–2011
Stand Up for the Week	2010–2013
Strike-back	2010–present
STV Sports Centre	2010–present
Sunday Morning Live	2010–present
Take Me Out	2010–2020
Tracy Beaker Returns	2010–2012
The Trip	2010–present
Turn Back Time – The High Street	2010–present
The Zone	2010–present

== Ending this year ==
Date	Programme	Channel	Debut(s)
1 January	Toonattik	CITV	2005
1 January	Action Stations! (TV programme)	CITV	2006
1 January	The Fluffy Club	CITV	2009
5 January	The Bear Family & Me	BBC Two	2011
6 January	Paradise Café	CBBC	2009
7 January	Famous and Fearless	Channel 4	2011
16 January	Zen	BBC One	2011
4 February	Live from Studio Five	Channel 5	2009
12 February	Brain Box	STV	2009
13 February	Lark Rise to Candleford	BBC One	2008
11 March	Strictly Money	CNBC Europe	2009
13 March	Outcasts	BBC One	2011
21 March	M.I. High	CBBC	2007
22 March	Secret Diary of a Call Girl	ITV2	2007
26 March	The Tudors	BBC Two	2007
8 April	Coming of Age	BBC Three	2007
11 April	Waking the Dead	BBC One	2000
19 April	Candy Cabs	BBC One	2011
22 April	Fern	Channel 4	2011
28 April	Rock and Chips	BBC One	2010
10 May	Campus	Channel 4	2011
12 May	Lunch Monkeys	BBC Three	2008
18 May	Vacation, Vacation, Vacation	Channel 4	2011
24 May	Two Pints of Lager and a Packet of Crisps	BBC Three	2001
30 May	The Scheme	BBC One	2010
1 June	Life of Riley	BBC One	2009
6 June	Psychoville	BBC Two	2009
24 June	Put Your Money Where Your Mouth Is	BBC One	2008
30 June	Ideal	BBC Three	2005
5 July	Lead Balloon	BBC Two	2006
10 July	Popstar to Operastar	ITV	2010
31 July	The Royal	ITV	2002
2 August	Sirens	Channel 4	2011
12 August	Sorry, I've Got No Head	CBBC	2008
2 September	My Family	BBC One	2000
11 September	Appropriate Adult	ITV	2011
12 September	Shooting Stars	BBC Two	1995
15 September	Torchwood	BBC Two, BBC Three, BBC One	2006
1 October	Doctor Who Confidential	BBC Three	2005
18 October	The Sarah Jane Adventures	CBBC	2007
21 October	EastEnders: E20	BBC Three	2010
23 October	Spooks	BBC One	2002
11 December	The Politics Show	BBC One	2003
14 December	That's Britain!	BBC One	2011
15 December	The World's Strictest Parents	BBC Three	2008
16 December	OK! TV	Channel 5	2011
19 December	Mongrels	BBC Three	2010
23 December	Britain's Best Dish	ITV	2007
30 December	Christmas Coach Trip	Channel 4	2011

== Deaths ==
Date	Name	Age	Broadcast credibility
2 January	Pete Postlethwaite	64	Character actor
5 January	Helene Palmer	82	Actress (Coronation Street)
15 January	Susannah York	72	Actress (Jane Eyre, Armchair Theatre)
2 February	Margaret John	84	Actress (Gavin & Stacey)
22 February	Nicholas Courtney	81	Actor (Doctor Who, The Sarah Jane Adventures)
15 March	Keith Fordyce	82	Radio and television presenter (Ready Steady Go!)
14 April	Trevor Bannister	76	Actor (Are You Being Served?, Last of the Summer Wine)
19 April	Elisabeth Sladen	65	Actress (Doctor Who, The Sarah Jane Adventures, Coronation Street)
22 April	John Sullivan	64	Scriptwriter (Only Fools and Horses, Citizen Smith)
23 April	James Casey	88	Comedian, radio scriptwriter and producer (The Clitheroe Kid)
26 May	Flick Colby	65	U.S. dancer and choreographer (co-founder/creator of the Top of the Pops dance troupes Pan's People, Ruby Flipper, Legs & Co., and Zoo; The Two Ronnies)
27 May	Janet Brown	87	Actress and comedian
4 June	Donald Hewlett	90	Actor (It Ain't Half Hot Mum, You Rang, M'Lord?)
8 June	Roy Skelton	79	Voice actor (Doctor Who, Rainbow)
25 June	Margaret Tyzack	79	Actress (The Forsyte Saga, EastEnders)
26 July	Silvio Narizzano	84	Canadian-born screen director (Georgy Girl, Play of the Week (ITV series))
2 August	Richard Pearson	93	Actor
22 August	John Howard Davies	72	Child actor and comedy director (Fawlty Towers)
11 September	Andy Whitfield	39	Actor and model (Spartacus: Blood and Sand)
27 September	David Croft	89	Television producer
15 October	Betty Driver	91	Actress (Coronation Street)
29 October	Jimmy Savile	84	DJ, television presenter (Top of the Pops, Jim'll Fix It), charity fundraiser and serial sex offender
20 November	Angie Dowds	42	Personal trainer (The Biggest Loser)
18 December	Ronald Wolfe	89	Writer (On The Buses, The Rag Trade)

== See also ==
- 2011 in British music
- 2011 in British radio
- 2011 in the United Kingdom
- List of British films of 2011
