= Louisa Bojesen =

Danish-American financial journalist

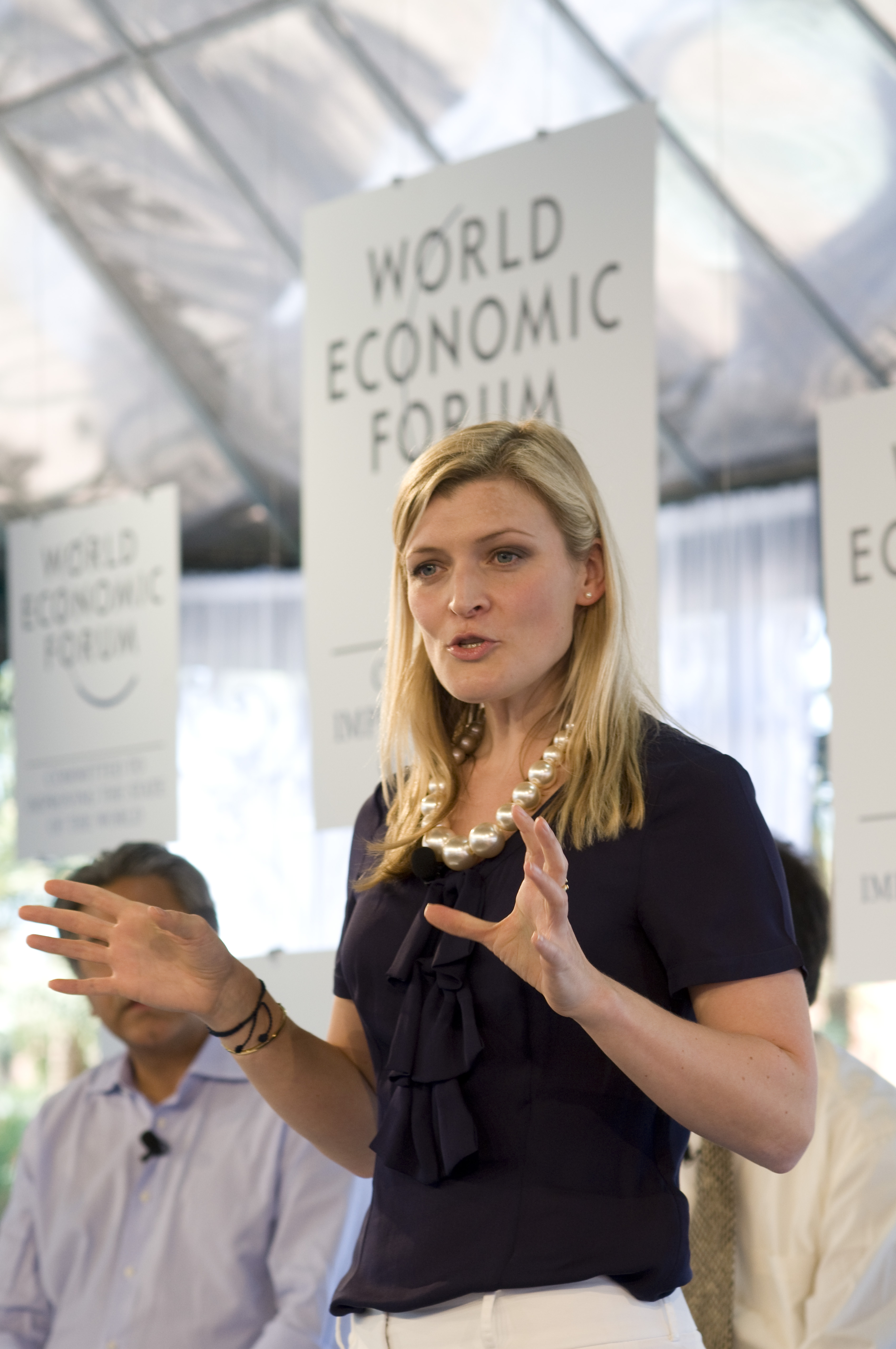
- Bojesen moderates a debate at the 2010 World Economic Forum on the Middle East in Morocco.
- Born: Copenhagen, Denmark
- Occupation: Business Journalist
- Employer: CNBC (2000-2017)

Louisa Bojesen (Danish pronunciation: [luˈiːsæ ˈpʌjəsn̩]) (born May 13, 1974) is a Danish-American financial journalist who worked for CNBC Europe television in London for 17 years. She was most recently a co-host of the channel's European version of Street Signs, reporting on global financial markets. In addition, Bojesen reported for CNBC (U.S.), CNBC Asia, NBC and MSNBC. She co-anchored Squawk Box Europe with Geoff Cutmore and Steve Sedgwick and anchored European Closing Bell until its final show on December 18, 2015. Bojesen co-anchored the European version of Street Signs until her departure from CNBC Europe on April 28, 2017.

Bojesen studied political science, medicine and philosophy at Loyola University Chicago before working in the financial field. She joined CNBC Europe in 2000, initially serving as a Nordic markets reporter in Copenhagen before moving to the channel's London headquarters.

In addition to her long-running duties on Squawk Box Europe, Bojesen was also formerly the host of CNBC's Power Lunch Europe between 2005 and its cancellation in early 2009. From 1999 through 2008, she served as the morning financial reporter for NBC's Early Today.

In 2008 she filmed the documentary Outbound Africa for CNBC, exploring the impact of the environment and poverty on rural Ghana. Bojesen made a brief appearance as herself in the 2005 BBC TV movie The Girl in the Café.

Bojesen was regularly seen on MSNBC's Morning Joe and (now cancelled) Way Too Early, providing early snapshots of the various U.S. and overseas markets.

Bojesen has covered such events as the Mobile World Congress and the World Economic Forum's annual Middle East meeting for CNBC. She has hosted the GSM Awards Ceremony in Cannes as well, the Pan European IR Awards in Zurich in October 2006 and was a speaker at the Danish Media Festival in November 2006. She hosted the Pan European IR Awards in Vienna in 2005, as well as the 2006 Nordic IR Awards in Stockholm. She has also given presentations on the Nordic economy at the London Stock Exchange.
