= Power Lunch Europe =

- Genre: business news, analysis
- Presented by: Louisa Bojesen (2005–2009); Patricia Szarvas (2005–2007); Ross Westgate (1999–2005); Kavita Maharaj (2003–2005); Jo Sheldon (1999–2001)
- Country of origin: United Kingdom
- Original language: English

Production
- Running time: 60 minutes (1 hour)

Original release
- Network: CNBC Europe
- Release: 8 November 1999 – 12 January 2009

Related
- Strictly Money, UK only Squawk Box, outside UK

Power Lunch Europe was a television business news programme on CNBC Europe, aired from noon to 1 pm CET (11 am to noon WET) each weekday, though it shared little with its U.S. counterpart other than its name. The programme was most recently presented by Louisa Bojesen, but it has been on hiatus since January 2009.

== Format ==
For many years, prior to March 2007, the format of the programme remained constant. The first half of the show consisted solely of a segment called Halftime Report, presented from the CNBC Europe video wall. This detailed the major trades from each of the major European bourses (the London Stock Exchange, Euronext Paris, and the Frankfurt Stock Exchange), as well as several of the minor exchanges, commodity and bond trading, and United States futures exchanges. The second half, presented from the desk, consisted of a number of interviews.

The programme was given a major revamp on 26 March 2007, in line with significant schedule changes at the network. The programme titles were re-coloured and a new theme tune was introduced. The Investor's Clinic segment of the programme, where viewers' questions are put to a panel of guests, has been increased in frequency to twice-weekly, and the Halftime Report now fills only the final fifteen minutes of the programme, focusing on just the equity markets. Other new segments introduced at this time include Research Notes, a daily look at changes in analyst ratings, and an update on the top stories in the United States from Worldwide Exchange anchor Michelle Caruso-Cabrera (later replaced by Brian Shactman).

The programme is regularly extended to two hours on days of European Central Bank and Bank of England interest rate announcements (and on those occasions it pre-empted the second hour of US Squawk Box), and also on US holidays (when Squawk Box is not aired).

== Hiatus ==
On 15 December 2008 CNBC Europe announced that the programme was to be replaced in the United Kingdom (and for those viewers in the Republic of Ireland who also receive the UK feed) by Strictly Money, a new programme focussing on UK specific issues which was to br broadcast for an initial 12-week period from 12 January 2009. In the rest of Europe, Squawk Box would air in its entirety for the interim. Strictly Money continued to air past this twelve-week period, and any return of Power Lunch has not been indicated.

Strictly Money, which is presented by Ross Westgate (who is also the Europe anchor of Worldwide Exchange), soon became a permanent fixture on the CNBC Europe schedule and many of the segments that used to appear on Power Lunch Europe have moved over to Strictly Money.

== See also ==
- Power Lunch
