= Squawk Box =

American business news TV program

- New graphics and set for CNBC's "Squawk Box" that debuted Oct. 30, 2019
- Genre: Business news program, talk show
- Presented by: Joe Kernen (1995–present); Becky Quick (2005–present); Andrew Ross Sorkin (2011–present); Mark Haines (1995–2005); Carl Quintanilla (2005–2011)
- Country of origin: United States
- Original language: English

Production
- Executive producer: Max Meyers (2018–present)
- Production locations: Fort Lee, New Jersey (August 7, 1995 – October 10, 2003); Englewood Cliffs, New Jersey (October 13, 2003 – January 6, 2015); Time-Life Building, New York City (January 7, 2015 – December 30, 2016); NASDAQ MarketSite, New York City (January 3, 2017–present)
- Running time: 180 minutes (3 hours)

Original release
- Network: CNBC
- Release: August 7, 1995 – present

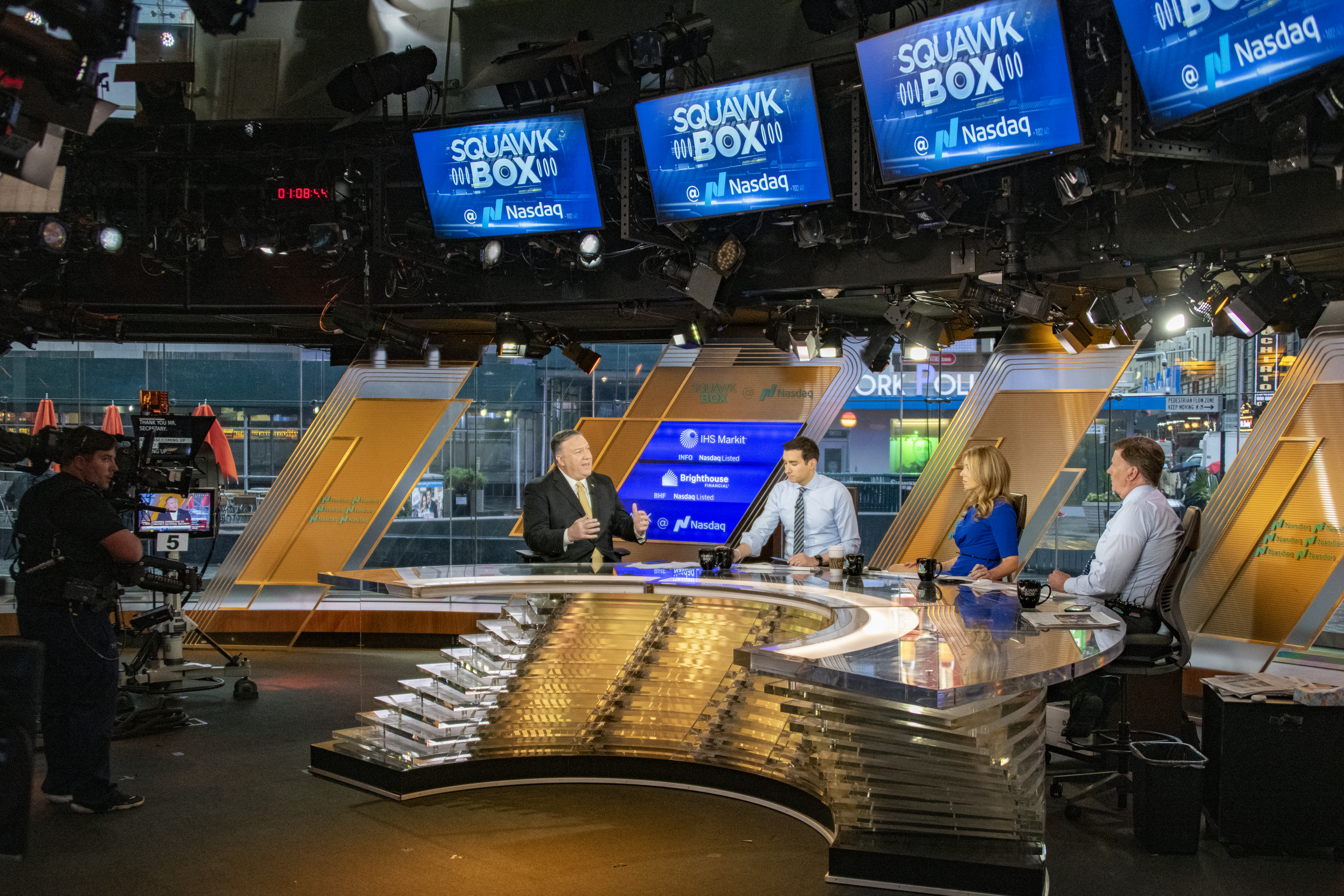
Secretary of State Mike Pompeo interviewed on Squawk Box in 2019

Squawk Box is an American business news television program that airs from 6 to 9 a.m. Eastern time on CNBC. The program is co-hosted by Joe Kernen, Becky Quick, and Andrew Ross Sorkin. Since debuting in 1995, the show has spawned a number of versions across CNBC's international channels, many of which employ a similar format. The program title originates from a term used in investment banks and stock brokerages for a permanent voice circuit or intercom used to communicate stock deals or sales priorities. It also may refer to the squawk of a bird, like a peacock, which is the former logo of CNBC between 1996 and 2025.

== Format ==
Dubbed "our pre-game show" by regular co-host Joe Kernen, Squawk Box features early-morning analysis of and breaking news from the international markets, along with considerable banter between the hosts and their guests – original host Mark Haines stressed the need to "inject a little fun" into business news in the early morning. Another long-running feature of the show has been its use of daily "guest hosts" – figures from the world of business and politics who join the team for much of the broadcast, questioning guests as well as offering their own opinions.

Regular contributors to the show include Sharon Epperson (NYMEX), Rick Santelli (Chicago), and Steve Liesman.

The program also features weather forecasts oriented towards business travel. Formerly provided by NBC News meteorologists, the program shifted to AccuWeather meteorologists after the Versant spin-off in November 2025.

== History ==
Squawk Box’s core on-air team remained intact for many years – the program was originally presented by New Jersey lawyer Mark Haines, along with in-studio reporters Joe Kernen, David Faber and Maria Bartiromo at the New York Stock Exchange. CNBC's senior economics reporter Steve Liesman also became a frequent contributor. Alexis Glick joined the team as senior trading correspondent in May 2003, while Bartiromo stepped down from her position in 2004 to concentrate on other duties. Becky Quick later replaced Glick as a reporter.

For many years the program covered the opening bells of the New York Stock Exchange and NASDAQ Stock Market at 9:30 a.m. Eastern Time. Other regular segments included the Squawk Exchange, where the team (particularly Faber and Kernen) shared banter on various topics, On the Box (rapid-fire summaries of the day's headlines) and Joe's World, where Kernen sounded off on the day's notable stock stories.

During the period when CNBC's online presence was housed at MSN Money, the show held its own daily Squawk Back Poll on the website, where viewers voted on a topical issue. In May 2005 the program established its own blog on Windows Live Spaces, called SquawkBlog, where the program hosts posted their thoughts, although this is no longer in use.

=== 2005 revamp ===
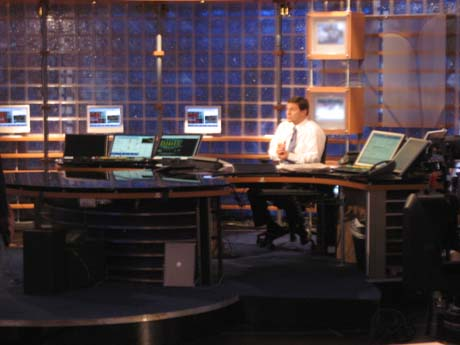
The Squawk Box set from October 2003 to March 2011

The program underwent a significant revamp on December 19, 2005, with the show moving to the 6:00 am ET timeslot and Kernen, Quick and Carl Quintanilla helming a new tri-anchor format alongside on-air editor Charles Gasparino. Haines and Faber moved to a newly created program, Squawk on the Street, anchored from the NYSE by Haines and Erin Burnett with Faber at CNBC headquarters. As a result of these changes, coverage of the market open at 9:30am ET passed to Squawk on the Street. The "guest host" feature of Squawk Box was dropped immediately after the revamp but later reinstated.

There was a significant amount of initial negative feedback about the changes made to Squawk, most notably the removal of Mark Haines from the team. On the Squawk Box blog, over 200 complaints were entered into the site, along with numerous messages posted on the CNBC message board.

=== 2011–present ===
On July 8, 2011, Quintanilla left Squawk Box to become part of the new Squawk on the Street anchor team, following Haines' death on May 24 of that year. His new assignment began three days later, when he debuted with Melissa Lee and Simon Hobbs. Andrew Ross Sorkin of The New York Times, joined Kernen and Quick in order to succeed Quintanilla's anchoring duties. Sorkin made his debut as co-anchor July 18, 2011.

On October 13, 2014, Squawk Box, along with CNBC's other trading-day shows, were launched in full 1080i high-definition as part of a network-wide switch to a full 16:9 letterbox presentation on that same day.

On January 7, 2015, Squawk Box moved to a new street-side studio inside the Time-Life Building in New York City after almost two decades in New Jersey (at CNBC's original facilities in Fort Lee from its August 7, 1995, debut to October 10, 2003, and at CNBC's facilities in Englewood Cliffs from October 13, 2003, to January 6, 2015).

On January 4, 2016, Squawk Box debuted a remastered version of its logo used since October 13, 2014. On February 8, 2016, both the Asian and European versions also started using the remastered Squawk Box logo.

On November 14, 2016, it was officially announced by the NASDAQ that production of Squawk Box would be relocated to the NASDAQ MarketSite studio in Times Square; it began broadcasting from there on January 3, 2017. That same studio is also shared with CNBC's two other shows, Fast Money and Options Action (the latter aired on Fridays until its end in mid-September 2023; both shows are hosted by Melissa Lee).

On November 15, 2017, Squawk Box moved downstairs to a new street-level studio overlooking Times Square, also at the NASDAQ MarketSite.

On October 30, 2019, Squawk Box renovated its set at the NASDAQ MarketSite. The curved desk was replaced with a round anchor desk, a setup similar to the one the show had used when it aired from CNBC's Englewood Cliffs studios. New graphics and music were also introduced.

== Show times ==
The program airs from 6 a.m. until 9 a.m. Eastern Time in the United States.

It is relayed in its entirety live on CNBC Europe although it is sometimes partially pre-empted for local programming, particularly to cover European Central Bank interest rate announcements and the subsequent press conferences.

It is aired in its entirety on CNBC Asia.

== Spin-offs ==
=== Squawk Box Weekend Edition ===
CNBC briefly aired a weekend version of the programme. Called Squawk Box Weekend Edition the programme was broadcast at the weekend from 7:30 to 8 pm ET during c. 1999 to 2000. It was also hosted by Mark Haines.

=== Worldwide Squawk Box ===
Around CNBC's global branches, there are many "Squawk Boxes" in the world:

| Channel | Program | Still Run? | Presenters |
|---|---|---|---|
| CNBC Europe | Squawk Box Europe | (1996—present) | Steve Sedgwick, Karen Tso, Ben Boulos |
| CNBC Europe | Squawk Outside The Box | (2007) | Geoff Cutmore |
| CNBC Asia | Squawk Box Asia | (February 2, 1998—present) | Sri Jegarajah, JP Ong |
| CNBC Asia | Squawk Australia | (March 26, 2007 – June 11, 2010) | |
| Nikkei CNBC | Tokyo Squawk Box | | |
| CNBC-TV18 | Bazaar | (1999—2004) | |
| CNBC-e | Geri Sayım | (October 16, 2000—present) | |
| Class CNBC | Caffè Affari | (?—present) | |
| CNBC Arabiya | Aswak Al Mal | (?—present) | |
| CNBC Africa | Squawk Box Africa | (2008-04-07(?)—present) | |
| CNBC Indonesia | Squawk Box Indonesia | (2018—present) | N/A |

Among the above, Squawk Box Europe and Squawk Box Asia are the counterparts which resemble the original Squawk Box the most:

- They are all three hours in duration.
- They all have a guest host appearing on the show, mostly after the first hour.
- In addition, Maria Bartiromo has served as a guest co-anchor on both Squawk Box Europe and Squawk Box Asia.

(Karen Tso moved to the Asian version of Squawk Box (and was based in Singapore) and after Amanda Drury briefly replaced Tso on Squawk Australia, Oriel Morrison moved into that role in 2010 while Drury was based in CNBC World Headquarters in the U.S.; the latter of whom has since returned to CNBC Asia, now based in Sydney). Tso moved to the European version of Squawk Box after joining CNBC Europe in 2011.

== Fantasy Portfolio Challenge ==
150,221 players participated in the Squawk Box Fantasy Portfolio Challenge, a stock-picking contest that ran from April 4, 2006 through May 26, 2006. The winner of the Squawk Box Fantasy Portfolio Challenge, which was announced live at the end of the 2 June 2006 episode, was Thomas Ko of California. His $5,015,735 portfolio value outpaced all the other contenders. He was also the winner of a brand-new, limited-production, 2006 Maserati GranSport.

== See also ==
- Squawk Box Europe
- Squawk Box Asia
- Squawk on the Street
- Squawk Alley
