= Steve Sedgwick =

Steve or Stephen Sedgwick may refer to:

- Steve Sedgwick (journalist)
- Steve Sedgwick (public servant)
- Stephen Sedgwick (mix engineer)
