= Szarvas (disambiguation) =

Szarvas (Hungarian for deer) may refer to:

Places:

- Szarvas, town in Hungary
- Szarvasgede, village in Hungary
- Szarvaskend, village in Hungary
- Sarvaš, village in Croatia

People:

- Alexandra Szarvas (1992), Hungarian football striker
- Patricia Szarvas (1970), Austrian freelance moderator

Other uses:

- Szarvas inscription
