= CNBC Europe =

European business television channel

- Country: United Kingdom
- Broadcast area: EMEA; Worldwide
- Headquarters: London, United Kingdom

Programming
- Picture format: 1080i HDTV (downscaled to 16:9 576i for the SDTV feed)

Ownership
- Owner: Versant
- Sister channels: List: CNBC; CNBC Indonesia; CNBC Africa; CNBC Arabiya; CNBC Asia; CNBC World; CNBC TV18; CNBC Awaaz; CNBC Bajar; CNBC Bangles; CNBC Tamilan; E!; Golf Channel; Syfy; CNBC-e (Turkey); Class CNBC; Nikkei CNBC; Times Brasil

History
- Launched: 27 February 1995; 31 years ago (European Business News); 11 March 1996; 30 years ago (CNBC Europe)

Links
- Website: Official Website

Screenshot of European Closing Bell, showing the network's presentation style from 1 March 2010 to 28 March 2014

The CNBC Europe logo used prior to September 2008

Consumer News and Business Channel Europe (referred to on air simply as CNBC) is a business and financial news television channel which airs across Europe. The station is based in London, where it shares the Adrian Smith-designed 10 Fleet Place building with organisations including Dow Jones & Company. Along with CNBC Asia, the channel is operated by the Singapore-headquartered CNBC subsidiary company CNBC International, which is in turn wholly owned by Versant.

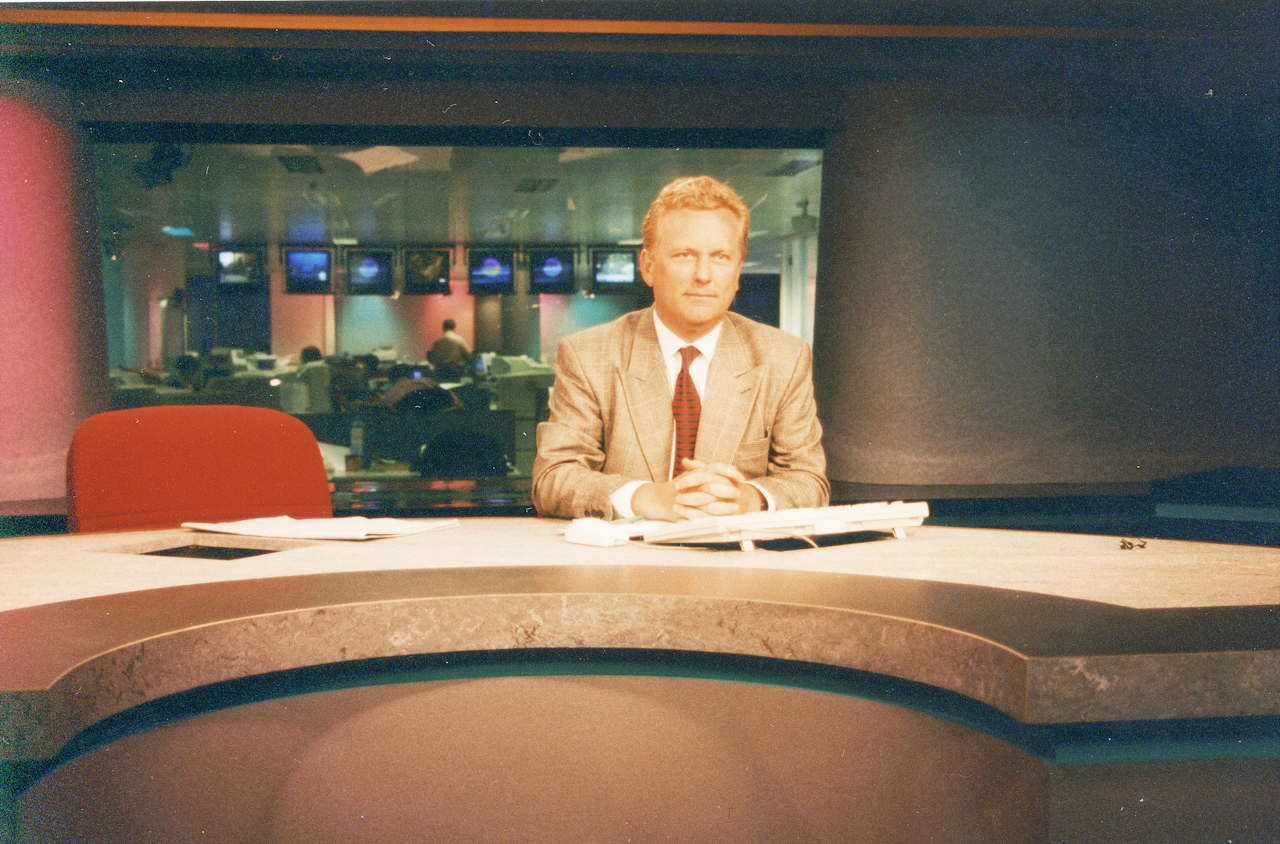
European Business News TV (EBN) with Ed Mitchell, London, in 1996

As the most viewed pan-European financial TV channel according to the 2010 EMS survey, the broadcaster reaches over 100 million households across the continent. CNBC Europe produces four hours of live programming each weekday and airs reports and content for its global sister stations and the outlets of NBC News.

== History ==
=== 1990s ===
The final logo of CNBC's NBCUniversal era. It is based on the 2022 NBC logo.

CNBC Europe began broadcasts in March 1996, as a wholly owned subsidiary of NBC. On 9 December 1997, the channel announced that it would merge with the Dow Jones news channel in Europe, European Business News (EBN), which had been on air since 1995. The merger took place in February 1998, upon which the channel then became known officially as "CNBC Europe – A Service of NBC and Dow Jones". The channel also aired on NBC Europe during the European business day until its closure in mid-1998.

=== 2000s ===
CNBC Europe has leaned generally on the U.S. CNBC on-air graphical look in the past. However, in June 2003, it revamped a number of its programmes, taking many of them away from the U.S. formats. CNBC Europe re-launched its on-air image in September 2004, but instead of adapting the U.S. title sequences for programmes, designed all of its title sequences itself from scratch (while still using the U.S. music adopted in September 2003).

In July 2005, NBC Universal announced that it would be acquiring the Dow Jones stake in CNBC Europe, subject to required regulatory clearances. On 30 December 2005, CNBC Europe became a wholly owned subsidiary of NBC Universal. Dow Jones continues to provide content to the channel. On 1 January 2006, in line with this, the channel dropped the "A Service of NBC Universal and Dow Jones" tagline.

On 18 September 2006, CNBC Europe debuted a new graphics package, which is similar to that used by its U.S. counterpart (first seen in the United States on 19 December 2005). Like CNBC Asia (which debuted a new graphics package similar to CNBC U.S. and Europe on 30 October 2006), it elected to keep the previous theme music (CNBC Asia did so until March 2007). In addition, CNBC Europe also elected to keep its September 2004 opening titles for most programmes.

The channel adopted a new schedule on 26 March 2007 which included a new pan-regional programme, Capital Connection. New title sequences were given to Power Lunch Europe and Europe Tonight to coincide with changes to the form and content of those programmes, but unlike CNBC Asia, no other changes were made to the channel's on air look on this date (although Capital Connection uses CNBC Asia's new graphics as it is produced by that channel).

On 7 January 2008, the channel unveiled a revamped studio and new "lower thirds". The lower-third style was distinct to CNBC Europe, but adopted some elements of the CNBC U.S. style.

On 29 September 2008 the channel dropped "Europe" from its on-screen name, returning to the CNBC brand it had previously used for a spell in the 1990s. This positioned the station in-line with its U.S. and Asian counterparts, which are also referred to simply as CNBC. Some minor on-screen changes were introduced to coincide with the rebrand.

On 1 December 2008 the channel relaunched its flagship programme Squawk Box Europe, with a new look not derived from CNBC U.S. at all. At the same time a third line was added to the ticker detailing general news stories.

On 15 December 2008 the channel announced that long running show Power Lunch Europe would be removed from the schedule and be replaced, in both Ireland and the United Kingdom only, with a 12-week run of Strictly Money, a new programme focussing specifically on UK issues. This marked the creation of a new UK/Ireland opt-out for CNBC Europe. The new schedule aired from 12 January 2009, with Strictly Money remaining in the schedule until its cancellation in March 2011.

CNBC Europe debuted a new lower thirds, which were completely different from its sister U.S. and Asian channels, on 27 July 2009.

=== 2010s ===
On 22 January 2010, the station ended its encryption on digital satellite television in the UK to increase its viewer footprint to an estimated 11 million households. The channel was subsequently added to Freesat on 23 February 2010.

A significantly revamped studio was unveiled in May 2011 along with a new format for various programmes.

The network was formally merged with CNBC Asia in December 2011 to form a new Singapore-based company, CNBC International, to manage the two stations. As a result of the merger CNBC Asia managing director Satpal Brainch was appointed to lead the new company, with his European counterpart Mick Buckley leaving his post.

On 31 March 2014, CNBC Europe launched in widescreen (16:9) and changed its lower thirds to match the on-air style of its sister CNBC Asia channel, which also launched in widescreen on the same day. The new look also saw the removal of the on-screen clock, which CNBC Europe had shown during live European and American programming since the channel was launched. This new on-air style did not carry over to CNBC US, which continued to use the old on-air style. CNBC US would ultimately follow with its own launch in 16:9 widescreen on 13 October 2014. An on-screen clock returned on this day (13 October) but it was a world clock with the time from various financial capitals shown on a rotating basis. CNBC Europe's on-air style (which was based on the US design used since 13 October 2014) was launched 9 March 2015, exactly a month after its sister Asia channel.

On 10 November 2015, CNBC announced cutbacks to its international television operation, including the closure of its Paris and Tokyo bureaus, and a two-hour reduction in local programming from London (which will be filled with more programming from the U.S. feed). The cuts, which will result in the layoff of 15 employees, comes as part of a wider focus on providing European market coverage via digital platforms, such as the CNBC website. The programming cutbacks from London took effect on 4 January 2016. Only two programmes, Squawk Box Europe and the European version of Street Signs (the latter debuted on the same day), are produced out of CNBC Europe's Fleet Place studios in London.

On 1 February 2019, CNBC Europe launched free-to-air in HD on Astra 28.2°E. and 19 June 2021, change frequency free-to-air in HD on Astra 28.2°E to 12,168 GHz.

=== 2020s ===
On 12 November 2020, CNBC Europe launched free-to-air in HD on Hot Bird 13°E.

On 9 September 2024, CNBC Europe updated its on-air presentation and branding to match the CNBC US branding that was first introduced on 11 December 2023. This was also CNBC Europe's first new graphics launch in exactly nine and a half years.

On 28 April 2025, CNBC Europe debuted a new weekday programme, Europe Early Edition, which is anchored by Silvia Amaro and airs from 7h to 8h CET. It replaced the outgoing Street Signs, which ended its 9-year run on 25 April 2025. Also, Squawk Box Europe moved to a new time, airing from 8h to 11h CET, with Julianna Tatelbaum joining incumbent anchors Steve Sedgwick and Karen Tso. New studio sets were unveiled as part of the new programme line-up.

In August 2026, CNBC's early morning programme, Europe Early Edition was cancelled as part of a reduction of live programming on CNBC Europe and CNBC Asia, Consequently, CNBC Europe now only airs three hours of live programming, and just one daily weekday programme, Squawk Box Europe. Decision Time the programme to cover the UK and European Central Bank lender rate announcements, continues as an opt-out from CNBC US programming.

== Ratings ==
Unlike its American sister station, CNBC Europe does not have its ratings measured on a daily basis: the channel resigned its membership of the UK's Broadcasters' Audience Research Board in September 2004 in protest at its refusal to incorporate out-of-home viewing into its audience figures. The network instead focuses its viewership measure strictly towards the top 20% income bracket, where figures are compiled as part of Synovate's European Media and Marketing Survey (EMS). CNBC Europe's monthly viewership grew steadily from 1.7 million to 6.7 million in the decade after its 1998 merger with European Business News, with annual growth coming in at around 10%. In the EMS survey covering 2010, the network's monthly reach was reported to be 6.8 million.

== Programming ==
=== European Business Day ===
==== Current programming ====
CNBC Europe produces three hours of live business day programming, from 8h to 11h CET. The major business day programmes, all broadcast from London, on CNBC Europe (as of September 2026) are:

- Squawk Box Europe – Steve Sedgwick, Karen Tso and Ben Boulos
- Decision Time (for live coverage of UK and European Central Bank lender rate announcements)

On trading days over the Christmas and new year period, CNBC Europe's output is reduced, limited to shorter editions of Squawk Box Europe with the rest of its four hours of output consisting of reruns of magazine programmes. Simulcasts of programmes originating from CNBC US and CNBC Asia remain unaffected. although CNBC Asia also operates a reduced schedule during this period. Regular programming resumes immediately after the New Year's Day holiday.

In addition, CNBC Europe produces other business-related programmes. Until April 2025 these programmes were premiered at 23h CET and repeated at various times over the weekend but now are shown exclusively at the weekend and on American bank holidays. Currently, these are:

- The Edge
- Marketing Media Money
- The CNBC Conversation

During the business day, the CNBC Europe Ticker is displayed during both programmes and commercials, providing information on share prices from the leading European stock exchanges (this means that advertisements on CNBC Europe are formatted differently from those on most television channels, taking up only part of the screen). When programming from CNBC Asia is shown, that network's ticker is displayed. A stack (or bug) providing index and commodity prices was displayed in the bottom right hand corner of the screen until December 2005, when it was replaced with a strip across the top of the screen (in line with the other CNBC channels). The ticker was decreased in size at the same time. The bug was moved back to the bottom right hand corner of the screen on 13 October 2014.

==== Extended programming ====
On the day each month when the bank lending rates are announced, CNBC Europe broadcasts Decision Time, which airs between 1300 CET and 1500 CET.

The channel provides extra programming during the annual January gathering in Davos of the World Economic Forum, frequently opting out of American programming to provide extra coverage, such as interviews and other events. And CNBC Europe broadcasts a nightly 60-minute early evening programme from the event which, in 2025, aired at 17.00 CET.

The channel also occasionally opts out of American programming for one-off interviews or for coverage of a specific event.

Until around 2017, CNBC Europe had broadcast extended programming on American bank holidays. In the mid 2000s, this took the form of an extended edition of Power Lunch Europe and during 2009 and 2010 CNBC had broadcast Strictly Money to the whole of Europe. In 2012 and 2013 the network broadcast a three-hour edition of Worldwide Exchange and a two-hour edition of European Closing Bell. In 2014 and 2015, CNBC Europe did not broadcast any extended programming on U.S. bank holidays, although on many of the 2016 American bank holidays, CNBC Europe broadcast two-hour editions of Street Signs. CNBC Europe no longer broadcasts any extended programming on American bank holidays.

==== Past programming ====
===== Live programmes =====
- European Money Wheel
- Europe Today (replaced by Today's Business Europe on 15 January 2001)
- Business Centre Europe (cancelled in late 2001)
- European Market Watch (replaced by Morning Exchange in June 2003)
- European Market Wrap (replaced by European Closing Bell in June 2003)
- Frankfurt Closing Bell (replaced by Europe Tonight in September 2004)
- Morning Exchange (replaced by Worldwide Exchange on 19 December 2005)
- Today's Business (replaced by Capital Connection on 26 March 2007)
- Power Lunch Europe (never formally cancelled but has not aired since 12 January 2009)
- Europe Tonight (cancelled at the end of 2009)
- Strictly Money (cancelled on 11 March 2011)
- European Closing Bell (cancelled 18 December 2015)
- Street Signs (replaced by Europe Early Edition on 28 April 2025)
- Europe Early Edition (cancelled in August 2026)

===== Magazine programmes =====
- Access Africa
- Agenda Europe
- Capital Ideas
- European Market Week
- Investing Edge
- Money & Sport

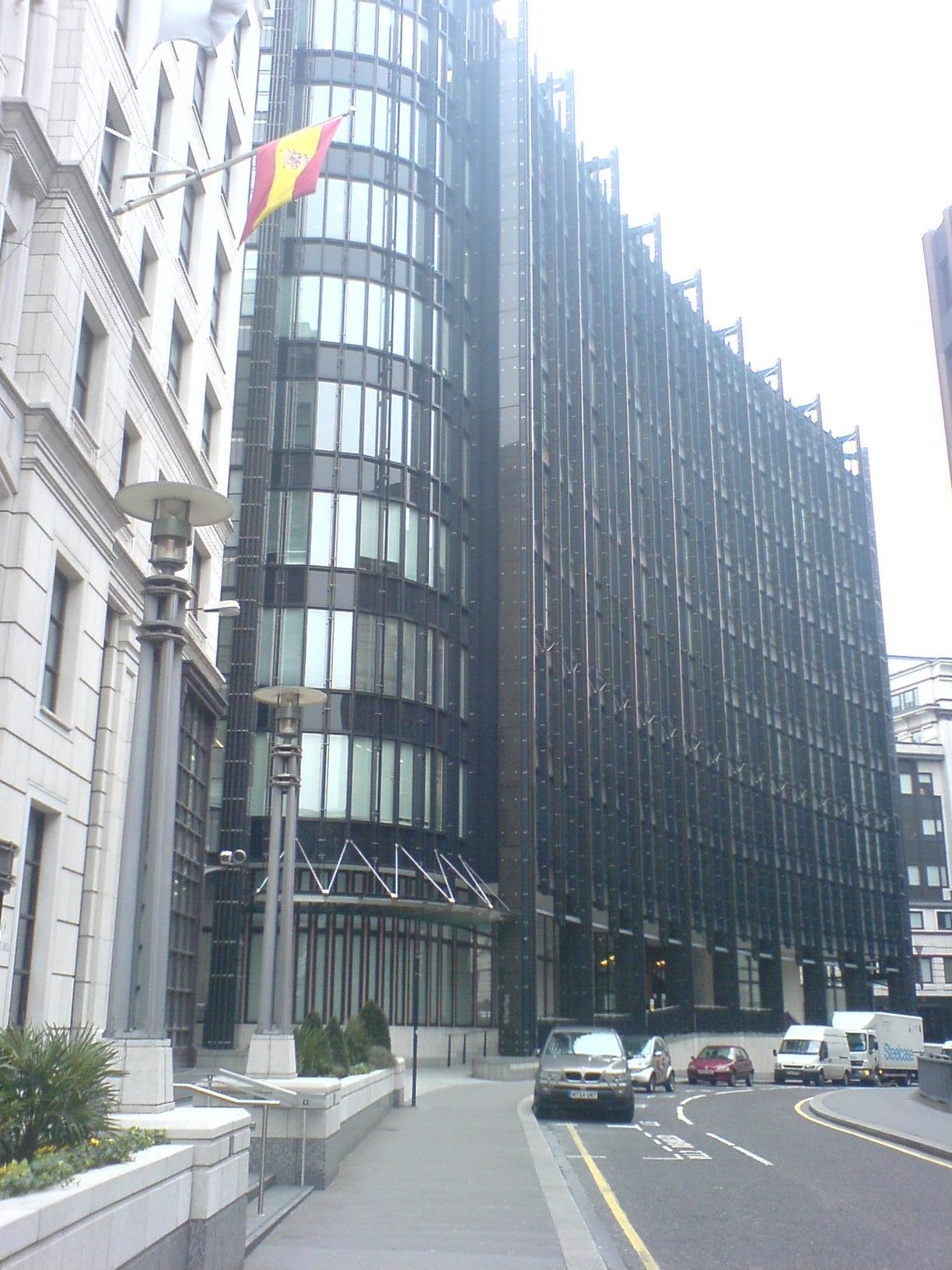
CNBC Europe's headquarters in Fleet Place, London

=== Rebroadcasts of CNBC U.S. and CNBC Asia ===
In addition to its own programming, CNBC Europe also broadcasts almost all of the business day programming from CNBC U.S., and has done so since the start of 2016. Prior to this, CNBC Europe had aired considerably more locally produced programming and the full schedule had only been seen on Europe-wide bank holidays which were regular working days in the United States, and between Christmas and the new year when CNBC Europe produced less European programming.

As of April 2025, Worldwide Exchange, Squawk on the Street, Fast Money Half Time Report, The Exchange, Power Lunch, Closing Bell and Fast Money are broadcast in their entirety. Squawk Box is also usually shown in full. However, on the day when CNBC Europe broadcasts its coverage of the monthly announcements of the UK and European Central Bank lender rates, only the first hour of Squawk Box is shown. Mad Money has yet to be seen on CNBC Europe.

While the U.S. markets are open, the CNBC Europe Ticker is modified to carry U.S. share prices. A break filler, consisting of HotBoards (CNBC's custom stock price graphs) is often broadcast during U.S. programming, owing to the increased number of advertising breaks. In addition, for many years, during the evening a recorded Europe Update, a 90-second run down of the European closing prices, and for a time in 2013 this concept was extended into daytime when CNBC Europe broadcast brief European updates twice an hour when the network was broadcasting CNBC U.S.'s Squawk programmes. These segments were broadcast live and, as with the recorded evening updates, were inserted into commercial breaks. Europe Update has now been discontinued and has been replaced with an insert detailing current items on CNBC Europe's website.

CNBC Europe broadcasts the entirety of CNBC Asia's output but this has only been the case since April 2025 and prior to this, only on Mondays was the entire day's output aired on CNBC Europe, and in the late 2000s, very little of CBBC Asia was seen as the channel had broadcast teleshopping and, latterly, poker programming overnight. During the period when poker was shown, CNBC Europe only broadcast the final hour (final two hours between April and October) of Asian programming, apart from late Sunday night/early Monday morning when the channel broadcast CNBC Asia's full morning line-up. In 2009, the majority of Asian programming was reinstated with NBC Europe joining CNBC Asia at midnight UK time, 1am CET.

=== Other programmes ===
Until April 2025, CNBC did not broadcast live business programming for two hours each weeknight. The weeknight non-business output run from 10 pm until midnight UK time and consisted of an edition of a weekly business magazine show, followed by an edition of Late Night With Seth Meyers and a live broadcast of NBC Nightly News. Business magazine shows are now restricted to weekends and to days when bank holidays mean that various markets do not trade. Late Night With Seth Meyers now only airs at the weekend and NBC Nightly News is no longer seen on the channel.

Weekend programming consists of weekly business programmes such as Managing Asia, business-orientated lifestyle programmes, CNBC US-produced documentaries (including American Greed), sport, several editions of chat show Late Night With Seth Meyers, paid religious programming and one-off programmes, such as CNBC on Assignment, dedicated to the world of financial news and politics.

The channel also broadcasts several hours of sports programming under the banner of CNBC Sports. The block currently airs during the day on Saturday and Sunday. Two hours are devoted to highlights of the US PGA Golf Tour.

==== Paid programming ====
CNBC Europe carries paid Christian televangelist religious programmes. They are shown in a block on Sundays, between 7.30am and 9am UK time, plus one 30-minute programme broadcast on Saturday mornings.

Previously, the channel had given over much of the overnight hours to teleshopping. Most teleshopping output was broadcast at the weekend although for a time in the mid-2000s, teleshopping was broadcast overnight during the week. Teleshopping ended on CNBC Europe in the early 2010s.

==== Former programming ====
===== CNBC Life =====
In February 2008 a weekend nine-hour CNBC Life strand, was launched. This slot, which ran during the afternoon and evening, incorporated the already established weekend afternoon sporting coverage of sports such as PGA Tour golf, tennis and yachting with new programming which included travel programmes produced by the Travel Channel, output from The Luxury Channel, news and current affairs broadcasts as well as the airing of programs from sister channels, such as The Tonight Show and Meet the Press. In September 2010 CNBC Europe began airing a series of operas and ballets on Sunday afternoons under the title of CNBC Performance. The 20-part series began in September 2010 and ran until the end of January 2011. This programming was repeated during the rest of 2011.

Since 2012 CNBC Life began to be wound down in favour of a schedule more focused on its core remit of business programming and the lifestyle, travel and CNBC Performance elements started to be removed from the schedule. The CNBC Life branding finally disappeared in 2018.

===== Simulcasts of MSNBC =====
The channel used to air American news channel MSNBC during weekend overnights and during the afternoon on American public holidays. CNBC Europe also carried MSNBC during major non-business related breaking news.

By the end of the 2000s, CNBC Europe had stopped showing MSNBC and pre-recorded business-related programming replaced the MSNBC broadcasts. Coverage of non-business related breaking news now comes from CNBC U.S..

=== Simulcasts outside Europe ===
All of CNBC Europe's live programming is broadcast in its entirety in the U.S. on CNBC World, and Europe Early Edition and Squawk Box Europe are shown on CNBC Asia.

The CNBC Europe ticker is seen on CNBC World but not on CNBC Asia and CNBC U.S.

== Presenters ==
=== Current anchors and correspondents ===
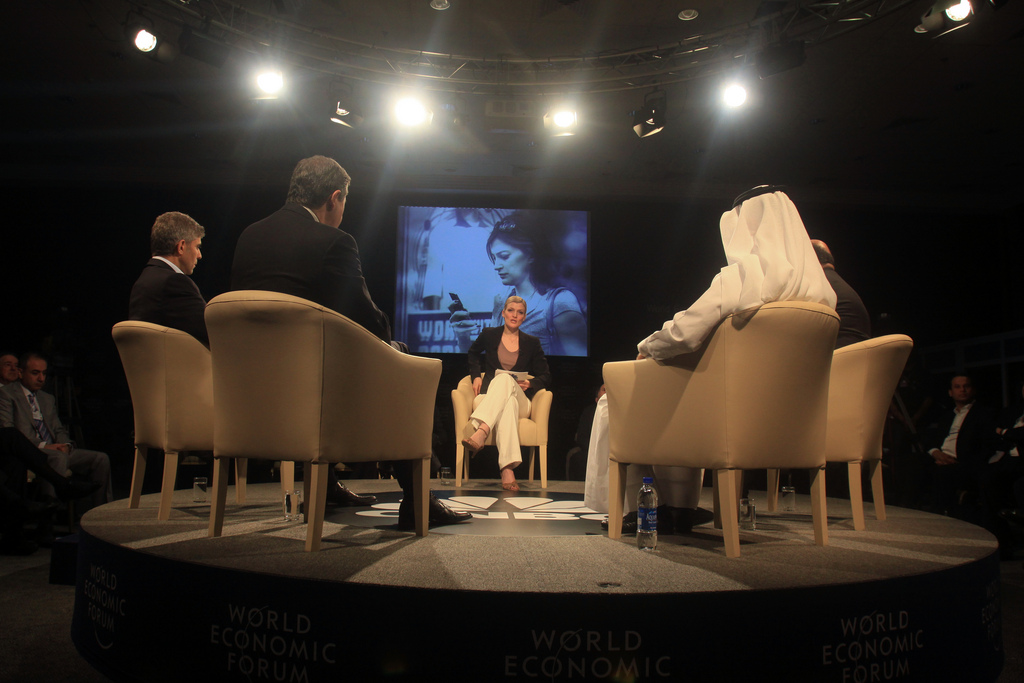
Then-CNBC Europe journalist Louisa Bojesen moderates a debate at the 2009 World Economic Forum on the Middle East in Jordan.

Staff are based in London unless otherwise stated.

- Silvia Amaro
- Ritika Gupta
- Ben Boulos
- Arjun Kharpal – technology correspondent
- Charlotte Reed – also French and Spanish market reporter
- Carolin Roth
- Steve Sedgwick – also CNBC Europe's OPEC reporter
- Julianna Tatelbaum
- Karen Tso
- Annette Weisbach (Frankfurt) – also CNBC's European Central Bank reporter

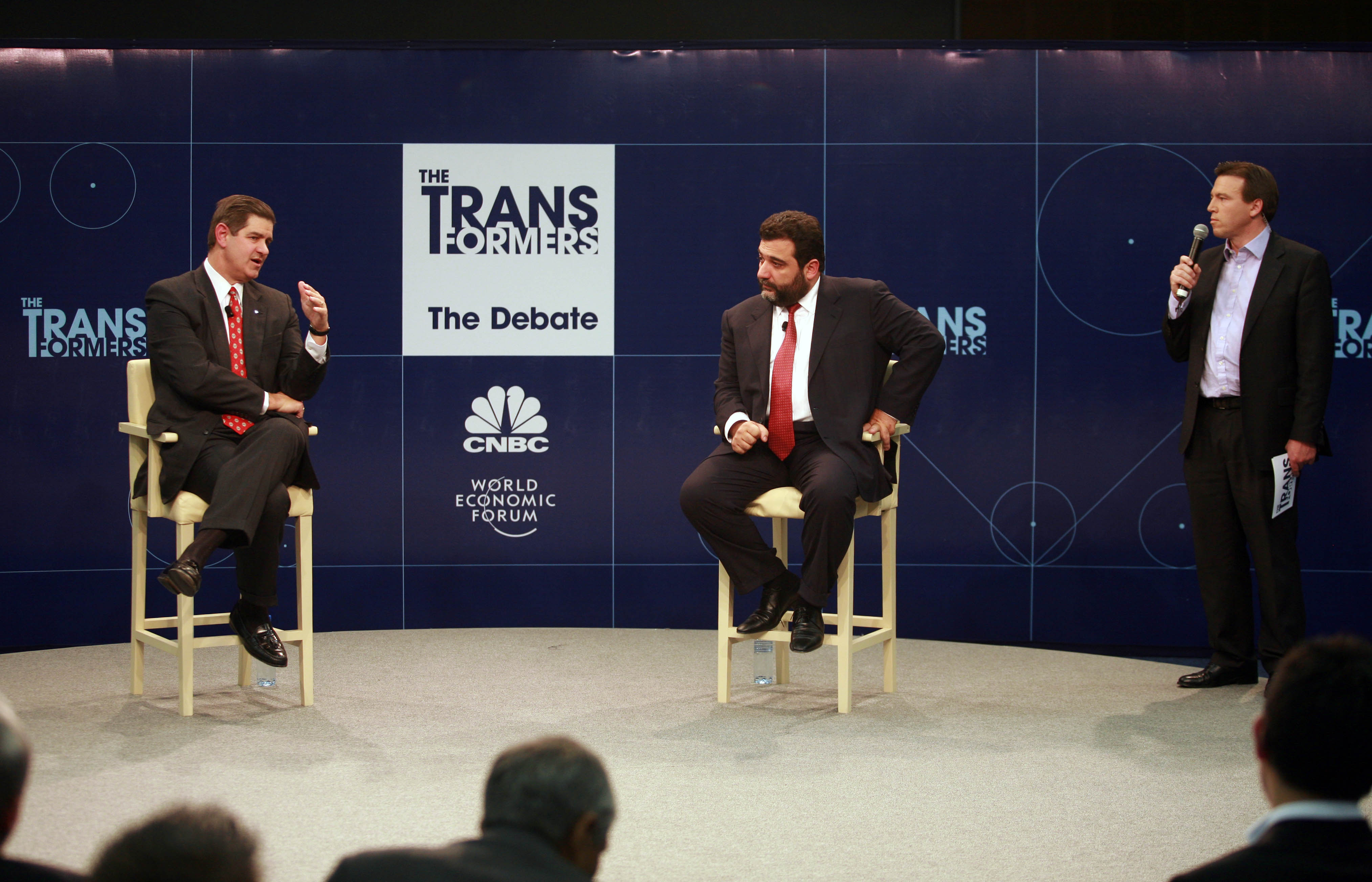
Then-CNBC Europe anchor Geoff Cutmore moderates a debate at the 2008 World Economic Forum: New Champions meeting in Tianjin, China.

=== Contributors ===
- Tania Bryer

=== Past anchors and reporters ===
- Becky Anderson (now with CNN International)
- Beccy Barr (formerly Rebecca Meehan; later with BBC North West; left television industry in July 2019, went on to become a firefighter, died July 2024)
- Joumanna Bercetche (now with Bloomberg Television)
- Louisa Bojesen (left 28 April 2017)
- Julia Chatterley (later with Bloomberg Television and now with CNN International)
- Ros Childs (now with Australia's ABC News Channel)
- Emma Crosby (now with Sky News)
- Geoff Cutmore (left 2 June 2023)
- Anna Edwards (now with Bloomberg Europe)
- Raymond Frenken (was Amsterdam Market Reporter and EU Correspondent)
- Wilfred Frost (later with CNBC US; left 16 February 2022, now with Sky News)
- Yousef Gamal El-Din (later with Bloomberg Television)
- Hadley Gamble (now with Al Arabiya English as its chief international anchor)
- Arabile Gumede
- Aaron Heslehurst (later with BBC World News)
- Simon Hobbs (later with CNBC US; left in July 2016)
- John Holland (was Frankfurt Bureau Chief)
- Guy Johnson (now with Bloomberg Europe)
- Shellie Karabell (Paris Bureau Chief 1999-2004; Time Warner Cable, Forbes.com)
- Susan Li (moved to CNBC US; left in August 2017, now with Fox Business Network)
- Willem Marx (now with NBC News as a London-based correspondent)
- Ed Mitchell
- Seema Mody (rejoined CNBC US in September 2015)
- Stéphane Pedrazzi (now at BFM Business)
- Nigel Roberts
- Patricia Szarvas (now a moderator, media coach, writer)
- Silvia Wadhwa
- Ross Westgate (now with Infinity Creative Media)

== Affiliate channels and partnerships ==
There is a feed of CNBC Europe for Scandinavian countries called CNBC Nordic. It shows identical programmes to CNBC Europe but has a ticker focussing on Scandinavian stock exchanges.

The channel also operates a separate feed for the United Kingdom. Before late 2008 this was used only occasionally, usually for advertising purposes. The network has since begun to actively market the feed to potential advertisers, and at the start of 2009 its first UK-specific programming, Strictly Money, began, initially as a 12-week experiment but the programme continued to air until March 2011. Now the only UK-specific programming is the occasional weekend teleshopping broadcast. Viewers in Ireland also receive this feed.

The following European channels also fall under the CNBC brand:

- CNBC-e, the defunct Turkish version of CNBC. This is unique in the CNBC family, in that after business day hours, it broadcasts popular general entertainment programmes and films, plus children's programming from Nickelodeon. Owned and operated under license by Doğuş Holding. NBCUniversal's share was acquired in 2015 by Discovery Communications and renamed TLC. The channel was reopened in 2024 with a new partner company.
- Class CNBC (formerly CFN-CNBC), the Italian version of the network, operated in conjunction with Class Editori and Mediaset.
- CNBC Arabiya, the Arabic version of the channel. Owned and operated under licence by Middle East Business News.
- On 10 July 2007, CNBC Europe announced the creation of a new Polish business channel, TVN CNBC Biznes, operated under license by TVN. The channel launched on 3 September, and shares resources with CNBC Europe through a permanent link to their London headquarters.

In December 2003, CNBC Europe signed an agreement with German television news channel N24 to provide regular updates from the Frankfurt Stock Exchange. Correspondents Silvia Wadhwa, Patricia Szarvas and Annette Weisbach report throughout the day in German. In June 2008 the channel also began producing thrice-daily video reports in German for the website of Focus magazine.

In October 2022, CNBC Europe signed an agreement with the Greek newspaper Naftemporiki. With that agreement, the newspaper's TV channel, Naftemporiki TV, airs the CNBC live programming from 6 p.m. to 11 p.m. and from midnight to 7 a.m. on weekdays.

== Other services ==
CNBC Europe is narrowcast in London's black cabs on the Cabvision network. Since 2005, CNBC Europe also produces the monthly magazine CNBC Business (formerly named CNBC European Business) in conjunction with Ink Publishing. The magazine is aimed at senior business people and business travellers.
