= Patricia Szarvas =

Patricia Falco Beccalli
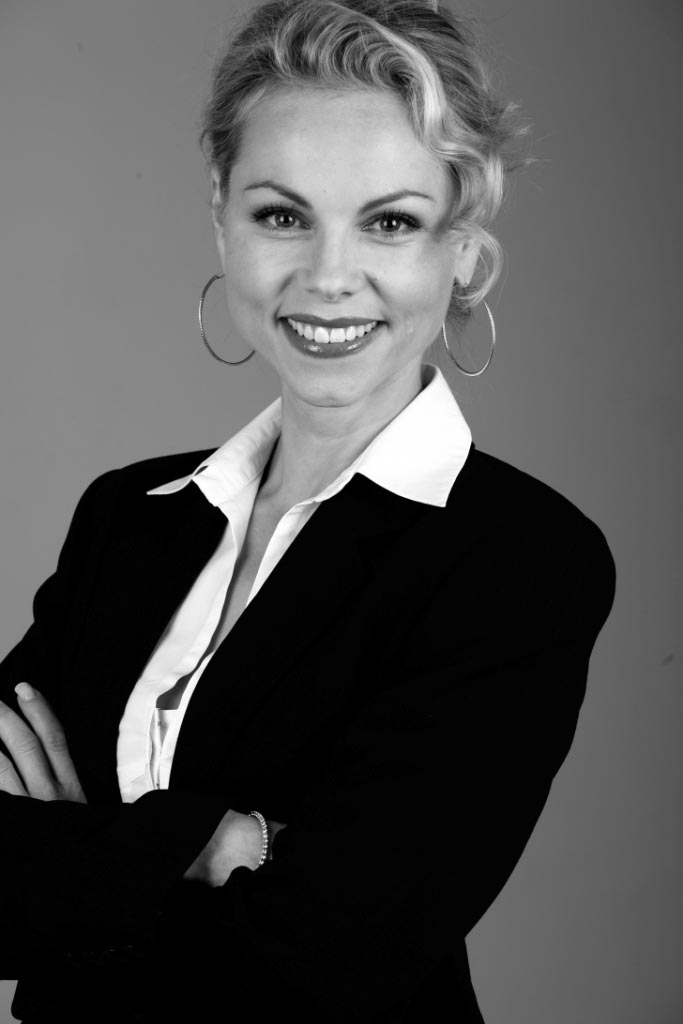
- Born: Patricia Szarvas; 21 January 1970 (age 56); Vienna
- Education: Economics and Communications
- Occupations: moderator, media coach, writer
- Notable credit(s): Morning Exchange and Power Lunch Europe co-anchor CNBC Europe main anchor

Patricia Falco Beccalli (born 21 January 1970 in Vienna, Austria) is a freelance moderator, executive media coach, and writer. For over 14 years she was a financial journalist and anchor of CNBC TV based in London. Moving on to Germany, she reported daily from the Frankfurt stock exchange on business and financial markets for many international studios of the CNBC network. She also reported for the German television station N24. Prior to CNBC she worked for the Italian broadcaster RAI 3 in Rome.

== Biography ==
After studying Economics and Communications Patricia Falco Beccalli worked as a broker, private banker, and portfolio manager in Frankfurt, London, and Luxembourg, and was a registered stockbroker at the London Stock Exchange. She speaks five languages: German, English, French, Italian, and Slovak. She has a daughter born in 2005.

From 1989 to 1999 she headed the stock exchange news department at the Italian public service broadcaster RAI. In 1999 she joined CNBC in London, where she became the co-anchor of the business news programmes Morning Exchange and Power Lunch Europe. She was the main contributor to CNBC's Capital Connection, Worldwide Exchange and Squawk Box Europe. She also was chief reporter for the automotive industry.

Patricia Falco Beccalli also moderates international political summits, economic and corporate conferences, such as the World Economic Forum (WEF) in Davos, Digital Life Design (DLD) in Munich, Northern Light in Helsinki, Euro Finance Week in Frankfurt.

Patricia Falco Beccalli works as a venture capitalist.

== Books ==
- Ricca Germania poveri tedeschi. Il lato oscuro del benessere (Università Bocconi, March 2014, in Italian)

== Sources ==
- Weis, Manuel (26 October 2007). "CNBC: Patricia Szarvas neues Gesicht des Senders in Frankfurt" (in German). CNBC Europe.
- "Patricia Szarvas berichtet ab sofort für CNBC und N24 von der Frankfurter Börse" (in German). Sat+Kabel. 26 October 2007.
