= Strictly Money =

- Genre: Business News and Analysis
- Presented by: Ross Westgate
- Country of origin: United Kingdom
- Original language: English

Production
- Running time: 60 minutes

Original release
- Network: CNBC Europe
- Release: 12 January 2009 – 11 March 2011

Related
- Power Lunch Europe; Squawk Box

Strictly Money was a business news programme aired on CNBC Europe in the United Kingdom and for domestic customers in the Republic of Ireland, each weekday at 11:00am Western European Time, between 2009 and 2011. It was usually presented by Ross Westgate.

The programme was also aired in the US on CNBC World at 6am ET.

== About the programme ==
The programme began on 12 January 2009, and replaced Power Lunch Europe. Originally intended as a twelve-week experiment, the programme appeared to have become a permanent fixture in the CNBC Europe schedule. While advertised as "strictly for the United Kingdom", the programme was also broadcast on both the Sky Digital and UPC Ireland systems in the Republic of Ireland, meaning that practically all domestic and a large proportion of commercial customers also in Ireland received the programme. Outside of the UK and Ireland, Squawk Box from CNBC US was screened instead.

After the cancellation of Power Lunch Europe, many of the segments that used to appear on that program moved to Strictly Money, including the "Investor Clinic" and the "Halftime Report."

On the day each month when the bank lending rates are announced, the programme was retitled "Strictly Rates" and was extended to two hours due to the timing of the rates decisions - 1200 for the UK announcement and 1245 for the ECB announcement. The monthly edition of Strictly Rates was broadcast across Europe as well as in the UK and Ireland.

== Cancellation ==
Strictly Money ended its 2-year run on 11 March 2011. However the monthly Strictly Rates specials continued to be broadcast but eventually Strictly Rates was renamed Decision Time.
