= Joe Kernen =

American news anchor (born 1956)

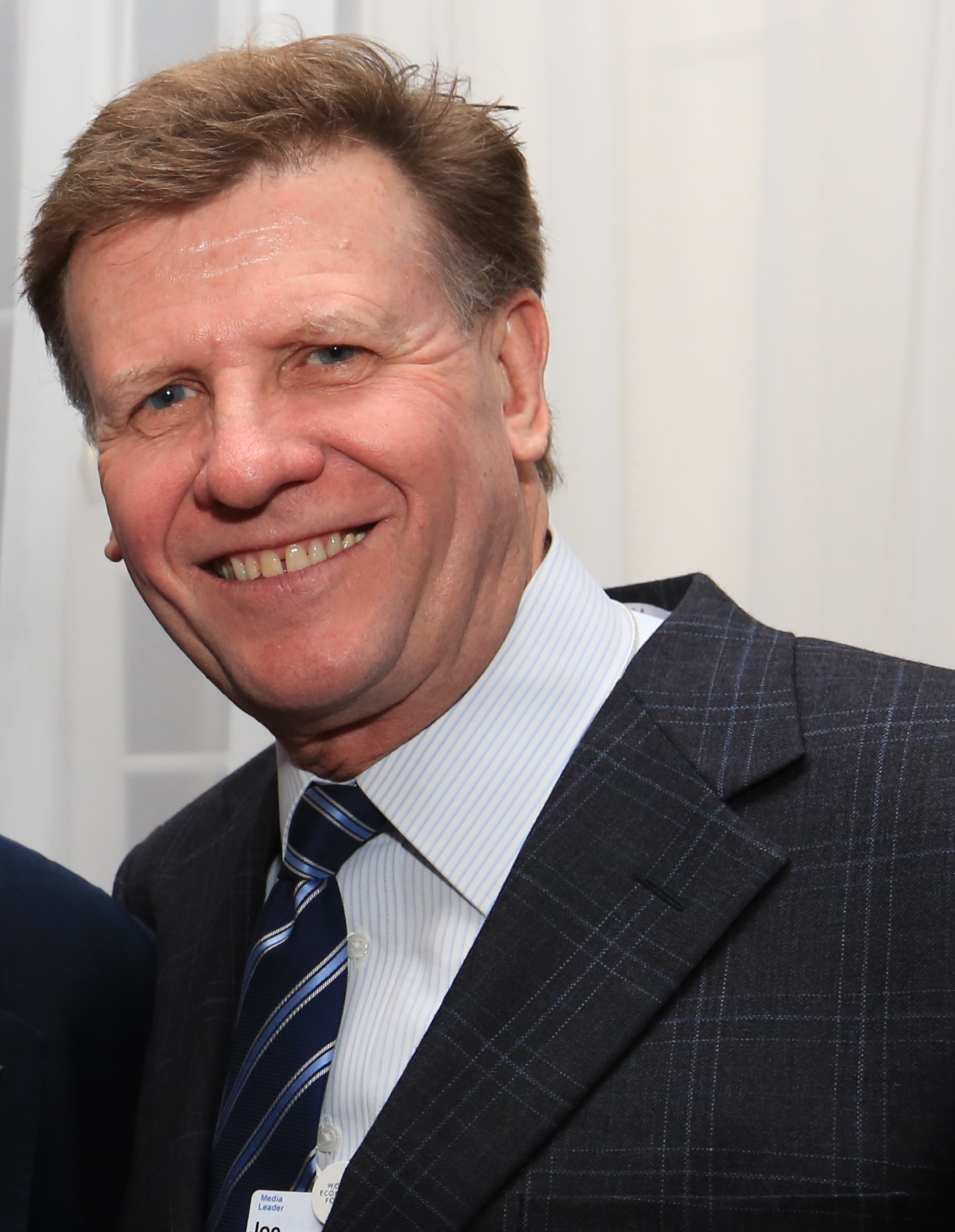
- Kernen in 2014
- Born: Joseph Richard Kernen; January 6, 1956 (age 70); Cincinnati, Ohio, U.S.
- Education: University of Colorado, Boulder (BS); Massachusetts Institute of Technology (MS)
- Spouse: Penelope Scott
- Children: 2

Joseph Richard Kernen (born January 6, 1956) is an American news anchor who is the co-host of Squawk Box on CNBC.

== Early life and education ==
Kernen spent his early years in an orphanage and was later adopted by a family in Western Hills, Cincinnati where he grew up. He graduated from St. Xavier High School in 1974. He holds a bachelor's degree from the University of Colorado Boulder and a master's degree in molecular biology from the Massachusetts Institute of Technology, where his Master's thesis was on cancer.

== Career ==
Kernen came to CNBC in the 1991 merger with Financial News Network, having joined FNN after a 10-year career in the finance sector.

In 1995, he became the co-host of Squawk Box.

Kernen is a conservative.

== Controversies ==
=== Imitation of Indian accent ===
On September 20, 2013, Kernen imitated an Indian accent on CNBC's "Squawk Box" program while discussing banknotes from India and asked if the Indian rupee is accepted as currency at 7-Eleven stores. He later stated, "Last Friday, I made an inappropriate and insensitive remark on Squawk Box. I apologize for any offense it caused."

=== Irish geography ===
In November 2014, during an on-air interview, Kernen asked IDA Ireland chief executive Martin Shanahan why Ireland did not use the pound sterling and asked if Ireland and Scotland were not on the same island. Critics say Kernen appeared to believe that Republic of Ireland was part of the United Kingdom.

== Personal life ==
Kernen is married to Penelope Scott Kernen, a former commodities trader from Short Hills, New Jersey. They met after she joined CNBC in 1996 and were married in 1998 on a golf course.

His nicknames are "The Kahuna" and "The Hair".

== Bibliography ==
Kernen authored Your Teacher Said What?!: Defending Our Kids from the Liberal Assault on Capitalism, (2011) with his then 5th grade daughter Blake.

== See also ==
- List of journalists in New York City
