= Ross Westgate =

British journalist

- Born: 1967 (age 58–59); England
- Occupations: Financial journalist, businessman
- Years active: 1990s–present
- Employer(s): CNBC Europe (until 2014), Infinity Media
- Known for: CNBC anchor, founder of Infinity Media
- Television: Morning Exchange, Power Lunch Europe, Squawk Box Europe, Worldwide Exchange, Strictly Money

Ross Westgate (born 1967) is an English financial journalist and businessman.

== Biography ==
Before studying for a postgraduate degree in Broadcast Journalism, he worked for 6 years in the City of London, where he was trained as a stockbroker, working with private clients.

For almost 20 years Ross worked for CNBC Europe. He anchored Morning Exchange and Power Lunch Europe. He also was a regular anchor and contributor on Squawk Box Europe. He also has daily appearances on MSNBC's Morning Joe, hosted by former Republican Congressman Joe Scarborough, where he reports on business news in different European countries, and many others.

In 2005 Ross became launch anchor of the global business news programme Worldwide Exchange. He was the sole anchor of Strictly Money at CNBC Europe and presented the monthly Strictly Rates programme which covers the monthly interest rate announcements from the UK and the ECB.

In addition to his anchoring duties, Ross attended many high-profile business events for the network, including the World Economic Forum in Davos, Switzerland, the Mobile World Congress and the International Advertising Festival in Cannes.

Ross left CNBC in June 2014 to launch a business career, Infinity Media. Since then the production company has done well, producing the Classic Car Show, The Wine Show, The Art Show, The Football Show and The Best Fifa Football Awards.
