= The British at Work =

Television series

- Genre: Documentary
- Presented by: Kirsty Young
- Country of origin: United Kingdom
- Original language: English
- No. of series: 1
- No. of episodes: 4

Production
- Running time: 59 minutes

Original release
- Network: BBC Two
- Release: 11 March – 1 April 2011

The British at Work is a four-part BBC Two documentary series, broadcast in 2011. It is presented by Kirsty Young.

== Episode list ==
No.	Title	Directed by	Original release date
1	"We Can Make It: 1945–1964"	Helen Nixon	11 March 2011
2	"Them and Us: 1964–1980"	Steve Condie	18 March 2011
3	"To Have and Have Not: 1980–1995"	Kate Misrahi	25 March 2011
4	"The Age of Uncertainty: 1995–Now"	Adam Grimley	1 April 2011
