= CNBC Arabia =

- Broadcast area: Arab World
- Headquarters: Dubai, United Arab Emirates

Programming
- Picture format: 1080i HDTV

Ownership
- Owner: Middle East Business News (franchisee)
- Sister channels: CNBC Europe

History
- Launched: 2003

Links
- Website: Official Website

Availability

Terrestrial
- Digital terrestrial television: Channel 34 (Dubai)

CNBC Arabia (Arabic: CNBC عربية) is an Arab free-to-air television channel. It covers regional and international affairs from an Arab economic perspective.

CNBC Arabia is the Arab World's first 24-hour Arabic language financial and business information channel, presenting in-depth & up-to-the-minute coverage of regional and international affairs from an Arab economic perspective. They bring real-time information to audiences in the Middle East and Northern Africa.

CNBC Arabia's daily program schedule features the region's business news summary, including regional stock market summary, regional corporate news, news about women in business, news about green businesses, and personal finance.

It is the only business-focused channel that delivers live regional market data in the Middle East, providing a ticker and analytical reporting.

With more than 5.5 million followers on social media, CNBC Arabia extends its reach beyond television, engaging a vast digital audience with breaking news, expert analysis, and exclusive interviews.

== Headquarters ==
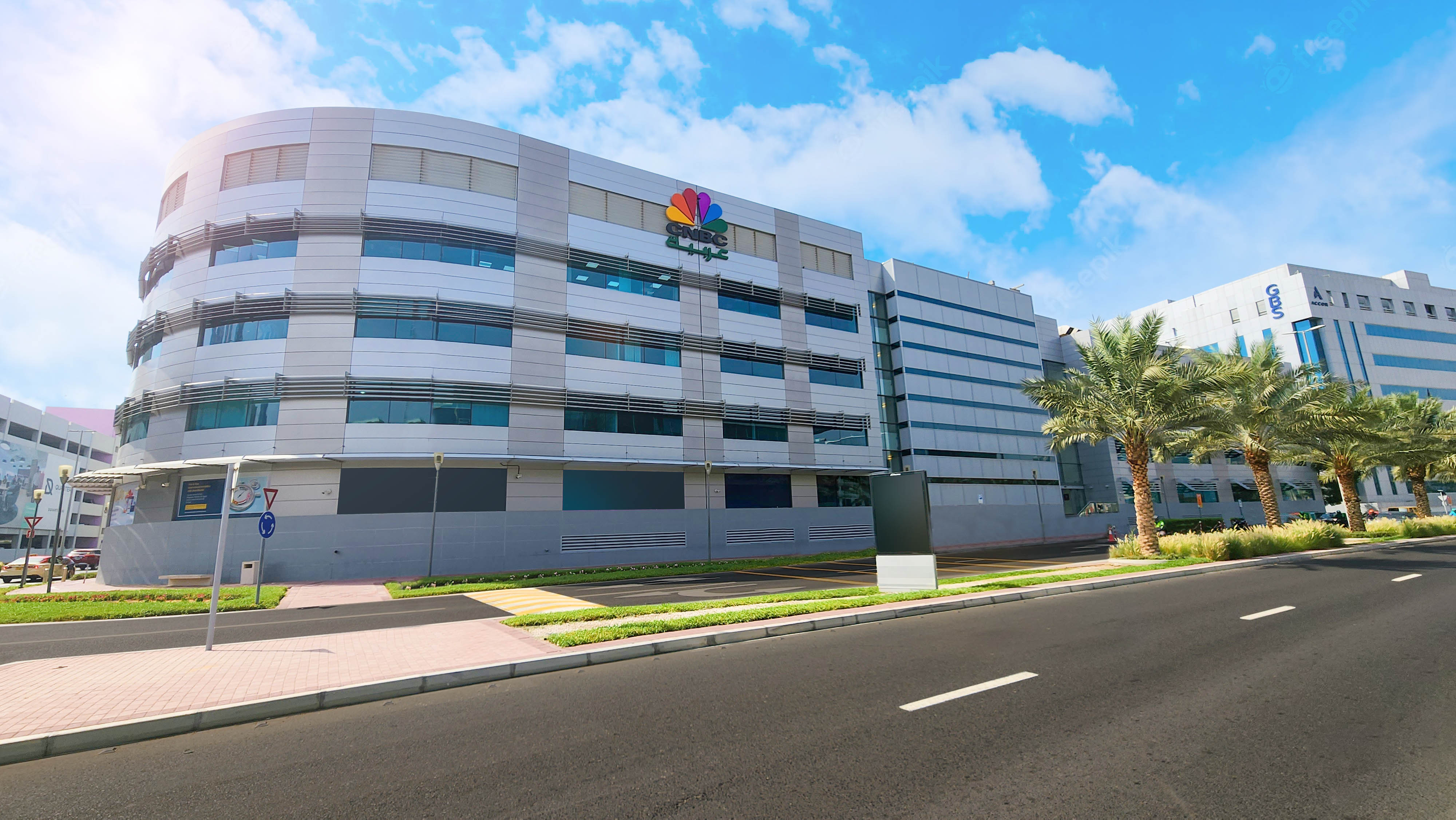
CNBC Arabia HQ - DMC

CNBC Arabia's broadcast facilities are based in Dubai Media City in the United Arab Emirates, with additional bureaus in Qatar, KSA, Cairo, Kuwait, and London and correspondents reporting from Iraq and Lebanon.
