= See You in Court =

- Directed by: Ross Wilson
- Country of origin: United Kingdom
- Original language: English
- No. of series: 1
- No. of episodes: 6

Production
- Producer: Lindsey Douglas

Original release
- Network: BBC One
- Release: 29 March – 17 May 2011

See You in Court is a 2011 BBC One documentary series about celebrities taking libel action against the media.

== Episodes ==
=== Episode 1: 29 March 2011 ===
- Lembit Opik claims that national newspapers made him a figure of fun and caused him to lose his seat in the 2010 general election.
- Sheryl Gascoigne claims that red top tabloids defamed her by printing quotes they said were from her ex-husband Paul and his mother.

=== Episode 2: 5 April 2011 ===
- Uri Geller challenges red-top articles, and an American television programme, about his relationship with Michael Jackson and alleged connection to Martin Bashir.
- Ali Dizaei claims newspapers have said things about him that are untrue. He was successful in receiving an apology and payout as a result of an article falsely accusing him of bigamy. He was convicted of a separate crime, for which he is serving a prison sentence.

=== Episode 3: 12 April 2011 ===
- Ultramarathon runner Richard Donovan takes action against Forbes magazine for their coverage of his North Pole marathon, which he says in inaccurate and unsatisfactory.
- Finsbury Park Mosque takes action against Policy Exchange in response to their claim that they distributed extremist literature.

=== Episode 4: 3 May 2011 ===
- Simon Singh is taken to court over his claims about chiropractic.
- Tristran Rogers

=== Episode 5: 10 May 2011 ===
- George Galloway
- Danielle Lloyd
