= House Guest =

British television series

House Guest is a British reality programme that ran on ITV from 19 May – 19 December 2008.

The show consists of a group of five people who each, along with a co-host, host a dinner party for the other guests. This involves a three course meal along with entertainment. The guests mark, out of 10, the host's food and hosting skills. After the party, one guest stays the night at the host's house and in the morning the guest marks their night's stay out of 10. The three individual scores give the host's total score, and at the end of the week, the host with the highest score wins the house guest trophy and a £1,000 prize. House Guest was noted for its similarity to Channel 4's Come Dine With Me.

A third season of the show, titled House Guest in the Sun, aired in March 2010 and featured British expats living in Europe, with a prize of €1,000.
