= Dating in the Dark (game show) =

British dating game show

- Genre: Dating game show
- Presented by: Sarah Harding (2011)
- Narrated by: Scott Mills (2009–10); Mathew Horne (2016)
- Country of origin: United Kingdom
- Original language: English
- No. of series: 4
- No. of episodes: 30

Production
- Running time: 60 minutes (inc. adverts)
- Production companies: Talpa and Initial (2009–11); Twofour (2016)

Original release
- Network: Sky Living (2009–11); ITV2 (2016)
- Release: 9 September 2009 – 20 October 2016

Related
- Dating in the Dark

Dating in the Dark is a British dating game show that first aired on Sky Living from 9 September 2009 to 5 July 2011 and then on ITV2 from 15 September to 20 October 2016.

== Transmissions ==
Series	Start date	End date	Episodes
1	9 September 2009	4 November 2009	8
2	13 July 2010	31 August 2010	8
3	17 May 2011	5 July 2011	8
4	15 September 2016	20 October 2016	6
