= How the Other Half Live =

British documentary series

How the Other Half Live is a British documentary series, broadcast on Channel 4 by the creators of the similar social benefit programme The Secret Millionaire. The show features a wealthy family providing 'sponsorship' for a family living in poverty in the UK.

There have been two series broadcast so far, one in 2009 and another in 2010. The series are six episodes long and each episode lasts roughly an hour with commercial breaks. Every episode focuses on a new pair of families. The children of the families swap DVDs and meet in person with their parents to explore their mutual lives and homes. The richer family then provide social and economic support to improve the situation for all involved, which normally includes the families meeting in person multiple times, and educational improvements for the children, as well as housing and monetary assistance.
