= Britain's Fattest Man =

2011 British television documentary

Britain's Fattest Man is a television documentary broadcast on Channel 4 and 4HD on 5 January 2011. It focuses on Paul Mason, who weighed 70 stone (980 pounds or 445 kilograms) and was the heaviest man in Great Britain until a gastric bypass operation saved his life. The documentary follows a year in his life as he undergoes a risky operation to enable him to lose weight.

== Ratings ==
The documentary was watched by 2.63 million viewers on its initial broadcast, giving it an 11.3% audience share in its timeslot. A further 334,000 watched the show on the Channel 4+1 catch-up service. It was the most popular show of the day for the channel.
