= Squawk Box Europe =

- Logo from 8 February 2016
- Genre: business news, analysis
- Presented by: Steve Sedgwick (2008–present); Karen Tso (2012–present); Julianna Tatelbaum (2025–present); Ben Boulos (2026–present); Geoff Cutmore (1999–2023); Ross Westgate (1999–2005); Simon Hobbs (1999–2003); Guy Johnson (2001–2007); Louisa Bojesen (2008–2010); Anna Edwards (2010–2011)
- Country of origin: United Kingdom
- Original language: English

Production
- Running time: 180 minutes (3 hours)

Original release
- Network: CNBC Europe
- Release: 5 April 1999 – present

Related
- Europe Today; incumbent

Squawk Box Europe (from May 2011 to April 2025, billed on-screen as just Squawk Box) is a television business news programme on CNBC Europe, aired from 8 to 11 am CET (7 to 10 am WET) each weekday. It also airs on CNBC Asia between 3.00 p.m. and 6.00 p.m. Hong Kong / Singapore time (2.00 p.m. – 5.00 p.m. with DST), and in the United States on CNBC World at the respective time, 2:00 a.m. – 5:00 a.m., ET. The programme is co-anchored by Steve Sedgwick, Karen Tso and Ben Boulos. Prior to June 2003, the programme ran for only two hours, between 7.00 and 9.00 UK time but later gained an hour from Today's Business.

== History ==
Squawk Box Europe was in existence prior to CNBC Europe's merger with European Business News. Like the current version, the original version took viewers to the opening of the European markets. This version was hosted by Nigel Roberts. After the merger, it was replaced by Europe Today for more than a year before being revived in 1999. The programme was originally known by the fuller title of CNBC Europe Squawk Box until it was relaunched in September 2004 as part of a wider relaunch of all of CNBC Europe's programming. From this point it used titles and graphics inspired by (but unlike the previously set, not directly derived from) CNBC US' look at the time and the show's theme music was an edited version of its US' counterpart's theme music used between 2003 and 2005.

On 1 December 2008, Squawk Box Europe was relaunched with a new look, logo, and music. The programme became more similar to the US version but the new look was designed especially for Squawk Box Europe. Louisa Bojesen and Steve Sedgwick, previously reporters, were promoted to full co-presenters of the programme at this point, and the "News Update" segments, which had been axed by CNBC Europe some years previously, returned.

On 1 March 2010, Squawk Box Europe, along with the rest of CNBC Europe's programmes, realigned its graphics (and title) with those of CNBC U.S. Bojesen left the programme in April 2010 to join European Closing Bell, and was replaced by Anna Edwards, but she left the network at the end of 2011 and was subsequently replaced by Karen Tso (formerly of CNBC Asia).

On 9 May 2011, the programme's format received a major re-working, with the second hour of the programme being dubbed "Squawk Pre-Trade" and the third hour as "Squawk Real-Time". The programme's on-air title was changed to simply "Squawk Box", in line with the US and Asian equivalents.

On 9 March 2015, Squawk Box Europe launched new titles and new theme music based on the US version. On 27 April 2015, the Asia version began using the US theme music.

On 8 February 2016, both the Asian and European versions started using the remastered Squawk Box logo that has been used by their US counterpart since 4 January 2016.

On 2 June 2023, Geoff Cutmore presented the programme for the final time, leaving after being a host of the programme for the past 24 years.

To coincide with CNBC Europe's graphics change on 9 September 2024, Squawk Box Europe launched new titles based on the US version used since 11 December 2023 and adopted the US show's theme music used since late October 2019.

On 28 April 2025, Julianna Tatelbaum, previously anchor of the now-cancelled Street Signs, joined the programme alongside incumbent anchors Steve Sedgwick and Karen Tso. Also, the programme's previous on-air title of Squawk Box Europe was fully restored for the first time since 6 May 2011. Additionally, the programme's third hour now airs on CNBC's main United States channel, from 4:00 a.m. to 5:00 a.m. Eastern Time.

Ben Boulos joined the Squawk Box Europe lineup, alongside Karen Tso and Steve Sedgwick, in early February 2026, as Julianna Tatelbaum begins maternity leave.

== Format ==
Since the May 2011 reformatting, the focus has been on the pan-European picture and the STOXX Europe 600 rather than on the national indices. It covers the opening of the European markets at 8:00 a.m. WET where one of the presenters stands in front of the video wall.

A guest host appeared on the programme each day during the second and third hour, like its US and Asian counterparts. However, this had ended by 2020. Another important element of the show is its interviews with other analysts and CEOs of major companies. Viewers are welcomed to email their thoughts and questions to the show's guests.

== Supplements to the show ==
For a while, Geoff Cutmore had a blog on CNBC.com, called "Morning Thoughts".

== See also ==
- Squawk Box Asia
- Squawk Box
- Squawk Australia
- Wake Up to Money on BBC Radio 5 Live
