= Sea Patrol UK =

- Created by: Guy Davies
- Country of origin: United Kingdom

Production
- Running time: 30 minutes

Original release
- Network: National Geographic Channel
- Release: 17 October 2009 – 2010

Sea Patrol UK is a British television documentary which followed the men and women who keep the English channel open for shipping. The series was produced by Wall To Wall productions in association with the National Geographic Channel.

== Premise ==
The series followed personnel from numerous agencies (including the Royal Navy, Royal National Lifeboat Institution, Royal Air Force, Customs, and the Coast Guard) with responsibility for monitoring, investigating, and protecting the English Channel.

== Episodes ==
=== Series 1 (2009) ===
No.	Title	Original release date
1	"Episode 1"	10 November 2009
Watch Manager Gary has to act swiftly when a giant Russian cargo ship threatens to capsize, and the team searches the rocky cliffs for a suicidal man
2	"Episode 2"	17 November 2009
Volunteers Jon and Steve face the bleak task of recovering a corpse from the water and the Royal Navy Fishery Protection Squadron do a check on a trawler that has been at sea for a few days
3	"Episode 3"	24 November 2009
Andy commences the dangerous 170-foot (52 m) winch down to a casualty, and the Royal Navy bomb-disposal unit deals with an unexploded World War II mine floating a few hundred metres away from the shore
4	"Episode 4"	1 December 2009
Two climbers have been reported missing at rocky islands near Boscastle and the Royal Navy bomb-disposal unit discovers a fishing boat has caught what looks like a rusty aircraft bomb.
5	"Episode 5"	8 December 2009
Royal Navy Fishery Protection Squadron's Lieutenant Commander Steve Moorhouse decides to deploy his team to inspect a trawler, and at the coastguard control room, there are reports of a broken-down chemical ship stranded in the middle of the English Channel
6	"Episode 6"	15 December 2009
A 61-year-old man has fallen onto rocks while fishing, Lieutenant Simon Yates and his team investigate a trawler suspected of fishing over the legal limit, and two young toddlers are in the water after their parents lost control of the pushchair

=== Series 2 (2010) ===
A second series, this time of eight episodes, followed in 2010.

== Filming ==
The crew interchanges with filming 24 hours a day, different crews film at numerous bases including:

- Coast Guard operations room in Warren Apron
- Royal Navy Fisheries Protection in Dover harbour
- RAF at Chivenor airfield in Devon
- The Kent marine police force in Dover Strait
- Search And Rescue Portland

== International broadcasts ==
Country	Channel	Year
Great Britain	National Geographic Channel	2009 -
Great Britain	Five	10 November 2009 -
