= That's Britain! =

- Presented by: Nick Knowles; Julia Bradbury
- Country of origin: United Kingdom
- Original language: English
- No. of series: 1
- No. of episodes: 4

Production
- Production location: BBC Television Centre
- Running time: 60 minutes

Original release
- Network: BBC One
- Release: 23 November – 14 December 2011

That's Britain! is a 2011 British television series which takes a light-hearted look at aspects of modern life which frustrate and infuriate people. Presented by Nick Knowles and Julia Bradbury the series first aired on BBC One at 8pm from 23 November to 14 December 2011. The first series comprises four episodes.

Topics covered in the show centre on every day issues, such as hospital parking charges, roadworks and overcrowded trains, with subjects being investigated by celebrity guests. For example, in the first episode the television presenter Grainne Seoige took a look at junk mail and comedian Ade Edmondson reported on the process of handling airport luggage. Another feature of the programme is Talk to the Wall whereby viewers are invited to contact the show with the topics which most annoy them. The most popular are then displayed on a wall in the form of a word cloud.
