= Discussion moderator =

Person who moderates a discussion

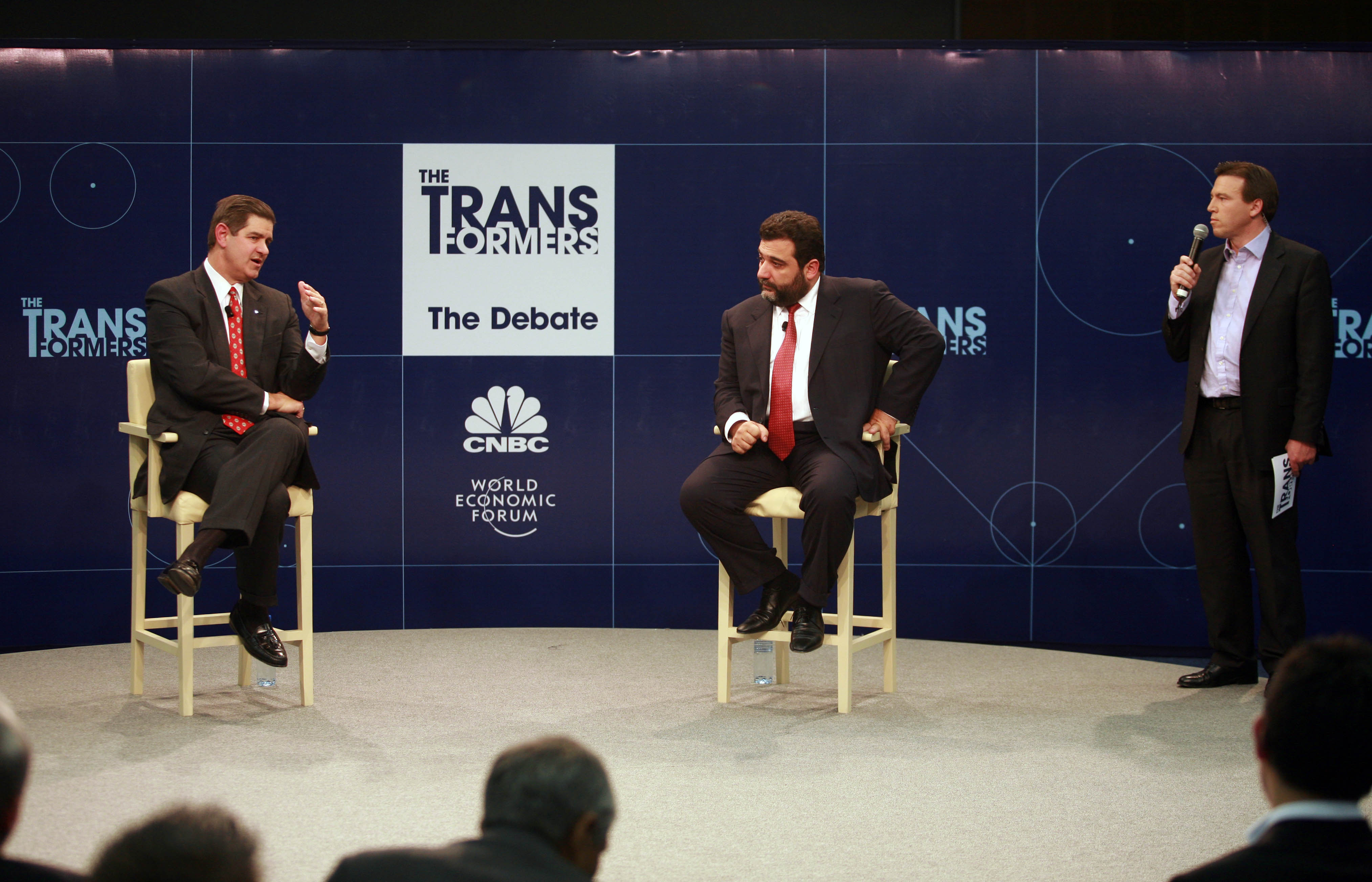
Geoff Cutmore, standing, moderates a debate on economic policy between James S. Turley and Ruben K. Vardanian.

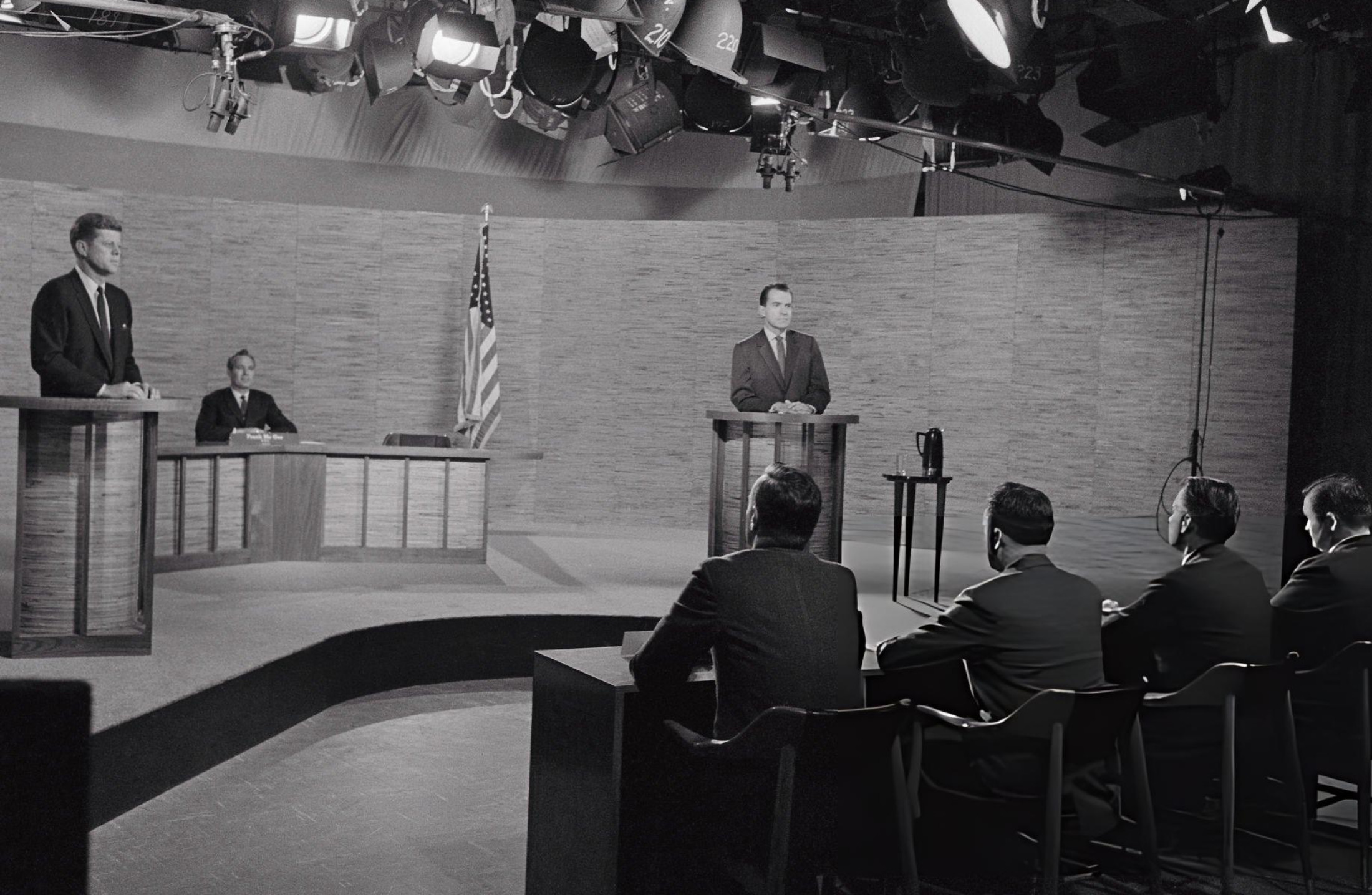
A 1960 United States presidential debate between John F. Kennedy and Richard Nixon had a panel of four moderators.

A discussion moderator or debate moderator is a person whose role is to act as a neutral participant in a debate or discussion, holds participants to time limits and tries to keep them from straying off the topic of the questions being raised in the debate. Sometimes moderators may ask questions intended to allow the debate participants to fully develop their argument in order to ensure the debate moves at pace.

In panel discussions commonly held at academic conferences, the moderator usually introduces the participants and solicits questions from the audience. On television and radio shows, a moderator will often take calls from people having differing views, and will use those calls as a starting point to ask questions of guests on the show. Perhaps the most prominent role of moderators is in political debates, which have become a common feature of election campaigns. The moderator may have complete control over which questions to ask, or may act as a filter by selecting questions from the audience.

== History ==
The role of the discussion moderator became significant in the year 1780, when a "Rage for public debate" led to a number of different organizations advertising and hosting debates for anywhere between 650 and 1200 people. The question for debate was introduced by a president or moderator who proceeded to regulate the discussion. Speakers were given set amounts of time to argue their point of view, and, at the end of the debate, a vote was taken to determine a decision or adjourn the question for further debate. Speakers were not permitted to slander or insult other speakers, or diverge from the topic at hand, illustrating the value placed on politeness.

In the television era, it is common for political debate moderators to be journalists, either individually or as a panel.
