= The Lock Up (TV series) =

- Genre: Observational documentary
- Directed by: Justin Kelly
- Narrated by: Anna Baatz, Chasity Van Velsen (later series)
- Country of origin: United Kingdom
- Original language: English
- No. of series: 2
- No. of episodes: 14

Production
- Executive producer: Julian Mercer
- Producer: Rachel Morgan
- Production location: Hull

Original release
- Network: BBC Three
- Release: 4 February 2011 – 25 March 2013

The Lock Up is an observational documentary series following the staff of the custody suite at Priory Road Police Station in Hull. It was first broadcast on 4 February 2011 on BBC Three. The first eight-part series was filmed over the course of a year; during the year, around 6,500 prisoners passed through the suite, and the issues custody officers had to deal with included attempted suicides and a range of troubled people including drug addicts, minors and violent individuals. The first series was shown on BBC Three and repeated on BBC One. The second series made its debut on BBC One on 28 August 2012. The first series was narrated by Anna Baatz whilst later series are narrated by Dutch-born British actress Chasity Van Velzen.

Lucy Mangan, writing for The Guardian, described the show as a "lesser version" of Channel 4's Coppers. Also writing for The Guardian, Phelim O'Neill said that "plain-speaking Humberside custody officers provide the commentary on the never-ending tide of all human life that passes through their care".
