= Steve Sedgwick (journalist) =

English financial journalist

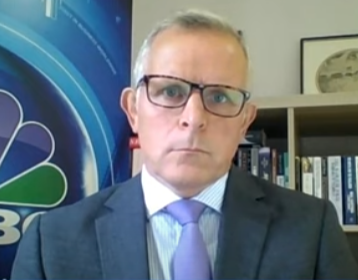
- At the World Economic Forum's Sustainable Development Impact Summit 2021
- Education: University of London; National Council for Training Journalists
- Occupation: Financial journalist

Steve Sedgwick is an English financial journalist for CNBC Europe in London. He presents CNBC Europe's breakfast news programme Squawk Box Europe. He is also CNBC's OPEC reporter.

== Biography ==
Steve studied politics at the University of London. He also studied journalism at the National Council for Training Journalists.

Before his career in journalism, Steve spent 11 years trading in the financial markets, specialising in equity and bond market derivative products. In 1988, he joined Dresdner Kleinwort Wasserstein (formerly Kleinwort Benson Securities) and worked as an equity option market-maker before moving on to Credit Lyonnais where he became Head of the London option market-making team on LIFFE.

Steve's journalism career began at the UK Press Association on the City desk and at Dow Jones on the European Markets desk. He was also a contributor to the Wall Street Journal Europe.

Steve then joined CNBC Europe, initially presenting early morning programming, most recently Capital Connection, before he became a co-presenter of Squawk Box Europe in 2008.
