= Geoff Cutmore =

British financial journalist (born 1966)

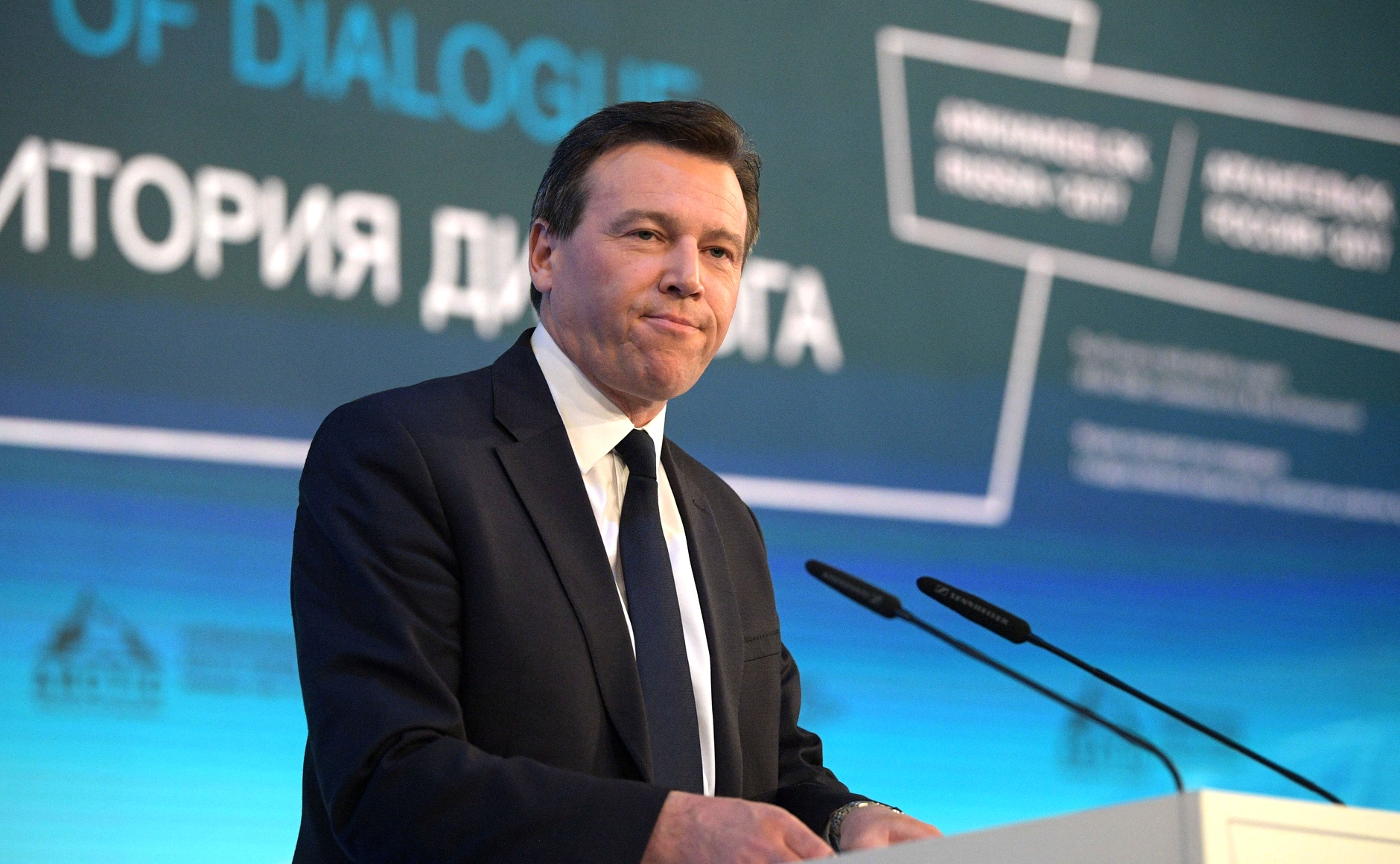
Geoff Cutmore

Geoff Cutmore (born 23 December 1966) is an English financial journalist.

He presented CNBC Europe's breakfast news programme Squawk Box Europe, from 1999 until his departure from CNBC on 2 June 2023. He was also an occasional relief presenter of Asia Squawk Box on CNBC Asia.

Cutmore was with CNBC for thirty years and prior to presenting Squawk Box Europe, he worked for CNBC Asia and was based in Hong Kong.

Cutmore signed off from CNBC for the final time at the end of Squawk Box Europe on 2 June 2023.
