= Perri Kiely =

British dancer & presenter (born 1995)

- Born: Perri Luc Kiely; 15 December 1995 (age 30); Essex, England
- Occupations: Dancer, presenter

Perri Luc Kiely (born 15 December 1995) is an English street dancer, TV and radio presenter. He is a member of the dance troupe Diversity, which won the third series of Britain's Got Talent in 2009. He finished as runner-up in the 12th series of Dancing on Ice in 2020. He and fellow Diversity star Jordan Banjo co-presented the radio show 'KISS Breakfast' between 2020 and 2026.

== Career ==
=== 2007–present: Diversity ===
Kiely is a member of the dance troupe Diversity, which was formed in 2007 and won the third series of Britain's Got Talent in 2009.

In July and August 2011, Kiely and fellow Diversity members Mitchell Craske and Ashton Russell, along with fellow Dancework studio dancer Nathan Ramsey, took part in the Born to Shine roadshow. At each show, two of the four would perform and take part in a dance masterclass for children.

Kiely and fellow Diversity member Jordan Banjo took on the role of the backstage presenters for the fourth series of Got to Dance in the spring of 2013.

In summer 2013, Kiely and Banjo hosted their own television show called Jordan and Perri's Ultimate Block Party, which saw them transform a club (swim team, youth club etc.) into a dance troupe.

It was announced on 17 February 2014 that Banjo and Kiely would be the UK hosts for the 2014 Nickelodeon Kids' Choice Awards

In March 2014, Kiely and Craske took part in the ITV - Where The Entertainers Live advert campaign.

Banjo and Kiely were again announced as the UK hosts for the Nickelodeon Kids’ Choice Awards for 2015 and 2016. Kiely took part in the second series of E4 dating show Celebs Go Dating.

=== 2014: Splash! ===
Kiely participated in the second series of Splash!, which began airing on 4 January 2014. He won the show, beating Richard Whitehead in the final.

Stage	Air Date	Dive	Board	Judges' Scores				Result
Stage	Air Date	Dive	Board	Andy Banks	Jo Brand	Leon Taylor	Total	Result
Heat 1	4 January 2014	Falling back somersault	10 metre	8.5	9.0	7.5	25.0	Saved by the public
Semi-final	1 February 2014	Inward 1 1/2 somersault with tuck	7.5 metre	9.5	9.0	9.0	27.5	Saved by the public
Semi-final	1 February 2014	1 1/2 somersault with twist	5 metre	7.5	8.5	8.0	24.0	Saved by the public
Final	15 February 2014	double somersault with tuck	3 metre springboard	10.0	10.0	10.0	30.0	Won
Final	15 February 2014	one-and-a-half somersault	10 metre	9.0	9.5	9.0	27.5	Won

Note* Each judge's scores are out of a possible 10 points (30 in total)

=== 2020–2026: KISS Breakfast ===
On 3 August 2020, Kiely and Jordan Banjo began presenting the radio show 'Kiss Breakfast' every weekday from 6am.

On 12 December 2025, the duo announced that they would be leaving the KISS network the proceeding month. On 30 January 2026, they presented their final show on KISS.

== Filmography ==
Year	Title	Role
2009	Britain's Got Talent	Winner, as part of Diversity
2010	StreetDance 3D	Member of Aaron′s Crew
2012–2014	Ashley Banjo's Secret Street Crew	Mentor
2013	Got to Dance	Backstage Co-presenter
2013	Got to Dance: Auditions Uncut	Voice-over
2013	Jordan and Perri's Ultimate Block Party	Co-presenter
2014	Splash!	Contestant, winner
2014	Ashley Banjo's Big Town Dance	Himself
2014	Get Your Skills On	Himself
2014	Hacker Time	Himself
2014	Stars at Your Service	Himself
2014	Jordan and Perri′s Xmas Slime	Himself
2014	Release The Hounds: Jingle Hell	Himself, team won £12,000 to split between NSPCC and Beatbullying
2014–2018	Nickelodeon Kids' Choice Awards	UK Co-host
2015	Diversity Live	Himself
2015	You're Back in the Room	Guest
2017	Diversity Presents Steal the Show	Himself
2017	Celebs go Dating	Himself
2018	The Great Stand Up to Cancer Bake Off	Himself, winner
2020	Dancing on Ice	Contestant, runner-up with Vanessa Bauer
