= Celebrity Big Brother (British TV series) series 22 =

Celebrity Big Brother
- Series 22
- Series twenty-two logo
- Presented by: Emma Willis
- No. of days: 26
- No. of housemates: 13
- Winner: Ryan Thomas
- Runner-up: Kirstie Alley
- Companion shows: Big Brother's Bit on the Side
- No. of episodes: 27

Release
- Original network: Channel 5
- Original release: 16 August – 10 September 2018

Series chronology
- ← Previous; Series 21 Next → Series 23

Celebrity Big Brother 22, also known as Celebrity Big Brother: Eye of the Storm, is the twenty-second series of the British reality television series Celebrity Big Brother, and the final series to air on Channel 5. It launched on 16 August 2018 and ended after 26 days on 10 September 2018. It was the fifteenth celebrity series and twenty-second series of Big Brother overall to air on Channel 5. For the first time since 2011, the celebrity edition aired before the main series with Big Brother 19 launching after the final in September 2018. Celebrity Big Brother 22 was the final celebrity series in the three-year contract which was announced on 19 March 2015. Emma Willis returned as host of the series, while Rylan Clark-Neal continued to present Celebrity Big Brother's Bit on the Side.

On 10 September 2018, Ryan Thomas was announced as the winner of the series, with Kirstie Alley as the runner-up.

On 14 September 2018, it was confirmed that this was the final series of Celebrity Big Brother to air on Channel 5 after their decision to axe the show. The series would later be revived on ITV1 in 2024 after ITV gained the rights to the series, currently hosted by AJ Odudu and Will Best.

== Format ==
Celebrity Big Brother is a game show in which a group of celebrity contestants, referred to as housemates, live in isolation from the outside world in a custom built "house", constantly under video surveillance. During their time in the House, the housemates are required to nominate two of their fellow contestants for potential eviction, and the two or more with the most votes would be nominated. This process is mandatory for all housemates, and failure to comply could result in expulsion from the House. The public then vote, with one of those celebrities evicted from the house. When the final week arrives, the viewers vote for which of the remaining celebrities should win the series, and the housemate with the most votes becomes the winner.

During their time in the House, housemates are given weekly tasks to perform. The housemates wager a portion of their weekly shopping budget on the task, and either win double their wagered fund or lose the wagered fund depending on their performance in the task. The housemates are required to work as a group to complete their tasks, with the format of the tasks varying based on the number of remaining housemates. Throughout the series, some housemates have been given secret tasks that must either be completed individually or with a small group; failure to do so can result in the housemate being nominated or punished in the House. Should the housemates run out of the food provided for them, an emergency ration was available to them. The housemates are forbidden from discussing nominations, and doing so could result in punishment. The format of the series is mainly seen as a social experiment, and requires housemates to interact with others who may have differing ideals, beliefs, and prejudices. Housemates are also required to make visits to the Diary Room during their stay in the House, where they are able to share their thoughts and feelings on their fellow housemates and the game.

== Housemates ==
On Day 1, thirteen housemates entered the house during the launch show.

Celebrity	Age on entry	Notability	Day entered	Day exited	Status
Ryan Thomas	34	Actor	1	26	Winner
Kirstie Alley	67	Actress	1	26	Runner-up
Dan Osborne	27	Reality TV star	1	26	3rd place
Nick Leeson	51	Financial trader	1	26	4th place
Sally Morgan	66	Psychic	1	26	5th place
Gabby Allen	26	Reality TV star	1	26	6th place
Hardeep Singh Kohli	49	Comedian and presenter	1	23	Evicted
Jermaine Pennant	35	Footballer	1	19	Evicted
Roxanne Pallett	35	Actress	1	17	Walked
Ben Jardine	37	Reality TV star	1	16	Evicted
Chloe Ayling	21	Model and abduction survivor	1	13	Evicted
Rodrigo Alves	35	Media personality	1	10	Ejected
Natalie Nunn	33	Reality TV star	1	9	Evicted

=== Ben Jardine ===
Ben Jardine is a British reality television personality and millionaire property tycoon, best known for his appearance on Channel 4's reality show Married at First Sight in 2017. He entered the house on Day 1. He was the third housemate to be evicted on Day 16.

=== Chloe Ayling ===
Chloe Ayling is an English glamour model, best known for her abduction in Italy in 2017 by an individual claiming to be a member of a criminal organisation called the Black Death Group. During her ordeal she was injected with ketamine, put in a holdall bag and put in the trunk of a car to be taken to a farm. She was released after six days. She entered the house on Day 1. She became the second housemate to be evicted on Day 13.

=== Dan Osborne ===
Dan Osborne is an English reality television personality, best known for starring in the ITVBe semi-reality programme The Only Way Is Essex from the eighth series in 2013. He was axed from the show during the fourteenth series when a threatening video he made surfaced online. He participated on the second series of Splash! (with former housemates Keith Duffy, Danielle Lloyd and Gemma Collins) in 2014 and placed fourth. He is also the husband of former EastEnders actress Jacqueline Jossa. He entered the house on Day 1. He left the house on Day 26 in third place. Throughout the series, he was the only housemate to receive no nominations.

=== Gabby Allen ===
Gabby Allen is a British reality television personality and fitness instructor, best known for being a cast member in the third series of ITV2 dating reality show Love Island in 2017 (with former housemate Jonny Mitchell). She entered the house on Day 1. She left the house on Day 26 in sixth place.

=== Hardeep Singh Kohli ===
Hardeep Singh Kohli is a Scottish comedian and presenter. He entered the house on Day 1. He was the fifth housemate to be evicted on Day 23.

=== Jermaine Pennant ===
Jermaine Pennant is an English professional footballer. Starting his career at Notts County in 1998, he then went on to play for Arsenal, Liverpool and Stoke City. In 2005, Pennant gained notoriety after playing a football match with an electronic tag following his arrest for drink-driving. He entered the house on Day 1. He became the fourth housemate to be evicted on Day 19.

=== Kirstie Alley ===
Kirstie Alley was an American Emmy Award and Golden Globe winning actress, known for her role as Rebecca Howe in NBC sitcom Cheers between 1987 and 1993. As well as this, she has appeared in films such as Star Trek II: The Wrath of Khan, Look Who's Talking and Drop Dead Gorgeous. She entered the house on Day 1. She left the house on Day 26 after finishing as the runner-up.

=== Natalie Nunn ===
Natalie Nunn is an American reality television personality, best known for her appearances in Oxygen's reality show Bad Girls Club on and off between 2009 and 2015. She entered the house on Day 1. She became the first housemate to be evicted on Day 9.

=== Nick Leeson ===
Nick Leeson is an English former derivatives broker, best known for his time at Barings Bank, the United Kingdom's oldest merchant bank. From 1992, Leeson made unauthorised speculative trades, where his actions led directly to the 1995 collapse of Barings Bank, for which he was sentenced to prison. He entered the house on Day 1. He left the house on Day 26 in fourth place.

=== Rodrigo Alves ===
Rodrigo Alves (later known as Jessica Alves) is a Brazilian-born British media personality, best known for his body modification and plastic surgeries. Earlier in the year, he appeared as a guest in the fifteenth Italian series of Big Brother, Grande Fratello. He entered the house on Day 1. On Day 2, he received a formal and final warning for repeatedly using racist language the night before. He was removed from the house in the early hours of Day 10, following a "further incident".

=== Roxanne Pallett ===
Roxanne Pallett is a British actress and singer, known for playing Jo Sugden in the ITV soap opera Emmerdale between 2005 and 2008. She participated on the fourth series of Dancing on Ice (with former housemates Melinda Messenger, Jeremy Edwards and Coleen Nolan) in 2009 and placed sixth. She entered the house on Day 1. On Day 17, Roxanne voluntarily left the house after making a false allegation of physical abuse against fellow housemate Ryan Thomas.

=== Ryan Thomas ===
Ryan Thomas is a British actor, known for playing Jason Grimshaw in the ITV soap opera Coronation Street between 2000 and 2016. Since then he has appeared as Rafael Humphreys in Australian soap opera Neighbours, and took part in Celebrity Island with Bear Grylls in 2017. He is the brother of Emmerdale actor Adam Thomas, and Love Island contestant Scott Thomas. He entered the house on Day 1. On Day 26, it was announced that Ryan had won the series.

=== Sally Morgan ===
Sally Morgan is a British television and stage artist, who claims to have psychic abilities. She entered the house on Day 1. She left the house on Day 26 in fifth place.

== Nominations table ==
	Day 5	Day 11	Day 16	Day 17	Day 20	Final Day 26		Nominations received
Ryan	Chloe, Natalie	Chloe, Roxanne	Ben	Hardeep, Jermaine	Hardeep	Winner (Day 26)		5
Kirstie	Natalie, Rodrigo	Hardeep, Chloe	Ben	Hardeep, Jermaine	Hardeep	Runner-up (Day 26)		2
Dan	Natalie, Roxanne	Chloe, Ryan	Jermaine	Hardeep, Sally	Hardeep	Third place (Day 26)		0
Nick	Kirstie, Chloe	Roxanne, Chloe	~~Jermaine~~, Ben	Hardeep, Jermaine	Sally	Fourth place (Day 26)		5
Sally	Hardeep, Rodrigo	Hardeep, Chloe	Ben	Hardeep, Jermaine	Hardeep	Fifth place (Day 26)		5
Gabby	Natalie, Rodrigo	Hardeep, Roxanne	Jermaine	Nick, Hardeep	Hardeep	Sixth place (Day 26)		2
Hardeep	Natalie, Sally	Chloe, Roxanne	Ben	Sally, Ryan	Sally	Evicted (Day 23)		23
Jermaine	Natalie, Hardeep	Nick, Hardeep	Nominated	Nick, Gabby	Evicted (Day 19)			7
Roxanne	Hardeep, Natalie	Hardeep, Ryan	Jermaine	Walked (Day 17)				5
Ben	Natalie, Ryan	Chloe, Ryan	Nominated	Evicted (Day 16)				5
Chloe	Nick, Hardeep	Nick, Hardeep	Evicted (Day 13)					9
Rodrigo	Gabby, Hardeep	Ejected (Day 10)						3
Natalie	Hardeep, Kirstie	Evicted (Day 9)						8
Notes	1	none	2	none	3	4		
Against public vote	Hardeep, Natalie	Chloe, Hardeep	Ben, Dan, Gabby, Hardeep, Jermaine, Kirstie, Nick, Roxanne, Ryan, Sally	Hardeep, Jermaine	Hardeep, Sally	Dan, Gabby, Kirstie, Nick, Ryan, Sally		
Ejected	none	Rodrigo	none					
Walked	none			Roxanne	none			
Evicted	Natalie; Fewest votes to save	Chloe; Fewest votes to save	Ben; 5 of 8 votes (out of 2) to evict	Jermaine; Fewest votes to save	Hardeep; Fewest votes to save	Gabby; 1.81% (out of 6)	Dan; 24.38% (out of 3)	
Evicted	Natalie; Fewest votes to save	Chloe; Fewest votes to save	Ben; 5 of 8 votes (out of 2) to evict	Jermaine; Fewest votes to save	Hardeep; Fewest votes to save	Sally; 5.18% (out of 5)	Kirstie; 36.95% (out of 2)	
Evicted	Natalie; Fewest votes to save	Chloe; Fewest votes to save	Ben; 5 of 8 votes (out of 2) to evict	Jermaine; Fewest votes to save	Hardeep; Fewest votes to save	Nick; 8.65% (out of 4)	Kirstie; 36.95% (out of 2)	
Evicted	Natalie; Fewest votes to save	Chloe; Fewest votes to save	Ben; 5 of 8 votes (out of 2) to evict	Jermaine; Fewest votes to save	Hardeep; Fewest votes to save	Ryan; 39.54% to win		

Notes

- ^Note 1: On Day 5, Kirstie (as House President) was able to award immunity to one housemate of her choice. She chose Jermaine.
- ^Note 2: Following Chloe's eviction, viewers were given the power to nominate. A free poll on the Big Brother app allowed viewers to pick their favourite housemate. The two housemates with the fewest votes – Ben and Jermaine – were nominated, and the remaining housemates were called to the diary room one-by-one to vote for the Nominated Housemate they would like to evict. After an initial tied vote, Big Brother asked the housemates to vote again by a show of hands. Nick switched his vote, and Ben was subsequently evicted on Day 16.
- ^Note 3: This week the housemates made one nomination, rather than two. Any housemate who received a nomination faced eviction.
- ^Note 4: For the final three days, the public were voting for who they wanted to win, rather than save.

== Summary ==
Day 1	Entrances	Kirstie, Ryan, Jermaine, Chloe, Rodrigo, Dan, Gabby, Hardeep, Ben, Roxanne, Sally, Natalie and Nick entered the house.
Day 1	Twists	After entering the house, Kirstie became President of the Big Brother house. Ryan was then voted by viewers as vice-president. They were to live in The White House, separate from the other housemates, and take charge of the house as well as getting special privileges. Three housemates were to receive "presidential decrees" as decided by Kirstie and Ryan. Dan was only allowed to consume veggie shakes until further notice, Rodrigo lost his suitcase, and Ben was only allowed to have cold showers.
Day 2
Day 2	Punishments	Rodrigo was given a formal and final warning for using unacceptable and racist language in a conversation the night before.
Day 3	Tasks	President Kirstie instructed her fellow housemates to build a wall, and then, led by Nick, to defend "Green Cards" whilst multiple intruders tried to climb the wall and steal them. Each green card stolen would occur a fail. At the end of the task they were told they had failed overall, and therefore received a basic shopping budget.
Day 4	Tasks	President Kirstie instructed her fellow housemates to build a wall, and then, led by Nick, to defend "Green Cards" whilst multiple intruders tried to climb the wall and steal them. Each green card stolen would occur a fail. At the end of the task they were told they had failed overall, and therefore received a basic shopping budget.
Day 5	Nominations	President Kirstie was given the power to award one housemate with a "Presidential Pardon", granting them immunity from nominations, which took place later that day. She chose Jermaine.; The housemates nominated for the first time. Hardeep and Natalie received the most nominations and faced the public vote.
Day 7	Tasks	In "Truth Hunter", Sally was given a statement about each of her fellow housemates and had to decide whether it was true or false using her intuition. As Sally guessed the majority of statements correctly, she won the task and a plate of jellied eels as her reward.
Day 7	Punishments	Natalie was given a formal warning for threatening and intimidating behaviour following an argument with Chloe.
Day 8	Tasks	Rodrigo was given a secret task from "Wendy the Washing Machine", where he had to get some gossip from another housemate and spill some cereal on their duvet. He was successful in this task and received a reward.
Day 9	Exits	Natalie was evicted from the house, receiving the fewest votes to save.
Day 10	Exits	Rodrigo was ejected from the house for unspecified reasons.
Day 10	Tasks	The housemates were set their next shopping task from "The Public Eye", where they each had to perform on cue for the viewers to give their reactions to online. To pass the task, the housemates had to get no more than five fails.
Day 11	Tasks	The housemates were set their next shopping task from "The Public Eye", where they each had to perform on cue for the viewers to give their reactions to online. To pass the task, the housemates had to get no more than five fails.
Day 11	Punishments	As punishment for discussing nominations, Hardeep and Nick were banned from using the bathroom until further notice.
Day 11	Nominations	The housemates nominated for the second time. Chloe and Hardeep received the most nominations and faced the public vote.
Day 12	Punishments	Despite passing their weekly shopping task, the housemates were told they would be given a basic shopping budget for breaking the rules regarding writing implements.
Day 12	Tasks	Kirstie took part in a British themed quiz.
Day 13	Tasks	Nick was given a secret task from "Wendy the Washing Machine", where he had to tell some home truths to two housemates of his choice, then spill some beans on them. He was successful in this task and was rewarded with the opportunity to send his son a birthday card.
Day 13	Exits	Chloe was evicted from the house, receiving the fewest votes to save.
Day 14	Tasks	Housemates were asked to choose the dirtiest housemate, the cleverest housemate, and the hottest housemates to take part in a number of games. Big Brother then rewound and made them take part in them again, and again.
Day 14	Punishments	Ryan was given a formal warning following an altercation with Roxanne. This was later revoked after the whole footage of incident proved there was no deliberate contact from Ryan.
Day 16	Twists	The housemates learned that Ben and Jermaine received the fewest votes in a public vote, and therefore face potential eviction. The remaining housemates each entered the Diary Room to vote for which of the two they would like to evict. At the end, as the voting was a tie, Big Brother gave the housemates one last chance to come to a decision. They ultimately decided to evict Ben.
Day 16	Exits	Ben was evicted from the house following a house vote.
Day 17	Exits	In the early hours of the morning, Roxanne decided to voluntarily leave the house.
Day 17	Tasks	The housemates were set their next weekly shopping task, where Dan, Gabby, Jermaine, Nick and Sally became the house pets, and Hardeep, Kirstie and Ryan became their owners. To pass the task, the animals were given individual rules to follow, and were only permitted to eat food prepared for them by their owners.
Day 17	Nominations	The housemates nominated for the third time. Hardeep and Jermaine received the most nominations and faced the public vote.
Day 19	Exits	Jermaine was evicted from the house, receiving the fewest votes to save.
Day 20	Nominations	Housemates were told for this week's nominations that they would all be making one killer nomination, with any housemate receiving one nomination automatically facing the public vote. Hardeep and Sally were the only Housemates to receive nominations, meaning they would face the next eviction.
Day 23	Exits	Hardeep was evicted from the house, receiving the fewest votes to save.
Day 26	Exits	Gabby left the house in sixth place, Sally left the house in fifth place, Nick left the house in fourth place and Dan left the house in third place. It was then revealed that Ryan was the winner, leaving Kirstie as the runner-up.

== Production ==
=== Eye logo ===
The official logo was released on 18 July 2018 (18 years after the first episode of Big Brother aired on Channel 4) and featured an eye consisting of neon lights including lightning bolts coming out of a stormy background.

=== Creative team ===
Endemol confirmed that a new creative team had been formed ahead of the series. Paul Osborne, executive producer of Big Brother 7, returned to overlook the new series as creative director. Tamsin Dodgson was also announced to return as Executive Editor. Trevor Boris was also later hired as a senior producer after co-producing Big Brother Canada since its inception.

=== House ===
On 15 August 2018, the official house pictures were released. The house is inspired by Californian design, and has been dubbed "a house within a house". The technical layout of the building has also undergone a revamp since the previous series, and the entry staircase has been closed-off for the first time since Channel 5 took over the Big Brother format, in order to "keep the outside out" according to the creative director Paul Osbourne.

There is also an outdoor lounge at the bottom of the garden, similar to the one in Big Brother 10, compared to Channel 5's usual choice to incorporate the lounge within the main living area. The new living area has a large circular dining table at the centre, with a kitchen counter at one side. There is a leaf-print decor, complemented by palm-style plants and additional seating.

There is one bedroom, located behind the kitchen, with the palm theme continued with blue beds and pink accents. Adjoined to the sleeping quarters is the spare bathroom, which features a roll-top bath and vanity table. In the garden, the snug has been replaced by a "pool room", a plush pink haven where the housemates can relax on padded loungers. The nearby sliding doors open up onto a dual swimming pool and hot tub deck, with which a mini cocktail bar is nearby.

=== Stormy Daniels ===
In the months prior to the live launch, there was wide speculation that adult film star Stormy Daniels would enter the house. Despite the reports, she did not enter the house on launch night.

A Big Brother statement issued the following day read: "Stormy Daniels was booked to appear on the show several months ago and hours before the show was due to go live, informed the production team that she no longer wished to enter the house as previously agreed. Producers discussed a variety of options with her but were unable to agree any acceptable conditions for her entering the house. Our focus is now on making a brilliant series with our fantastic celebrities."

Daniels said she offered to appear on the show during the live launch to explain her absence, but was turned down by producers. She also said an interview on Loose Women where she was due to explain her side of the story was blocked by Channel 5.

On the 17 August edition of Bit on the Side, Clark-Neal explained that just five hours before the first live show, Daniels said she only wanted to appear on launch night and then leave. Big Brother tried to agree to a compromise, but nothing came of it. Clark-Neal also insisted that money was not a factor and there was no attempt from producers to try to manipulate Daniels to achieve a specific outcome.

== Ratings ==
Official ratings are taken from the Broadcasters' Audience Research Board. From 27 August 2018, for the first time, catch-up service totals were added to the official ratings.

	Official viewers (millions)				
	Week 1		Week 2	Week 3	
Saturday		1.83	1.78	2.22	1.53
Sunday		1.67	1.84	1.96	1.74
Monday		1.89	1.88	2.23	2.02
Monday		1.89	1.88	1.59	2.02
Tuesday		1.85	1.75	2.17	
Wednesday		1.87	1.97	2.19	
Thursday	2.51	1.84	2.22	2.14	
Friday	2.13	1.87	2.18	1.80	
Weekly average	1.94		1.95	1.96	
Running average	1.94		1.95	1.95	
Series average	2.0				
Blue-coloured boxes denote live shows.

== Controversy ==
=== Racist language ===
Ofcom received over 1,000 complaints following Rodrigo Alves saying "nigger" twice on the first night. When describing fellow housemate Dan Osborne, Alves said that he was "too white for [his] taste", and he would prefer to have a "nigger boy". Rodrigo was given a formal and final warning by Big Brother regarding this incident, but Big Brother and Channel 5 were criticised by fans, with some of them questioning why he was not removed from the house immediately, using the example of Emily Parr's removal from the 2007 series to justify their reasons, and for the airing of the word on the highlights show. However, on Day 10, Rodrigo was removed from the house, after an unaired "further incident".

=== Roxanne Pallett's assault claim ===
Another controversy on the series came from Roxanne Pallett after she made a formal complaint that Ryan Thomas attacked her. While the footage showed Ryan "play fighting" with her through shadowboxing, she insisted that he punched her "like a boxer punches a bag" and told her housemates this version of events. She later slept in the spare bedroom after she claimed that she felt uncomfortable sleeping in the same room as him. Following the incident, Ryan was given a warning, but he insisted that he did it with "no malice". Roxanne continued to complain about him still being allowed in the house and later branded him a liar to her fellow housemates when he protested his innocence.

The incident was denounced by viewers as a deliberate attempt by Roxanne to destroy Ryan's reputation. Following this, 21 Emmerdale cast members criticised Roxanne for her behaviour, with Charley Webb branding her as "outrageous", as well as Sammy Winward tweeting that it was "a long time coming". Kelvin Fletcher, who played her on-screen husband Andy Sugden in the soap said that the incident was "calculated and manipulative beyond belief" whilst also showing support for Ryan. Within four days, Ofcom received over 25,000 complaints, making this the most complained incident regarding any Big Brother show since the race row in 2007. Furthermore, a petition launched to get her removed from panto work scheduled for Christmas reached over 4,000 signatures within two days. In the early hours of Day 17, Roxanne decided to voluntarily leave the house. Two days after her departure, on 3 September 2018, she returned for an interview with Willis, which was shown during that night's eviction show, where she apologised, stating she had made a "horrible mistake" but also stated she wanted to be "forgiven" for her actions. This incident has been called "punchgate" by the press.
