= The More You Ignore Me =

The More You Ignore Me may refer to:

- The More You Ignore Me (film), a 2018 British comedy-drama film
- "The More You Ignore Me" (Modern Family), a 2015 TV episode

== See also ==
- "The More You Ignore Me, the Closer I Get", a 1994 song by Morrissey
- "The More You Ignore Me, the Closer I Get" (The Vampire Diaries), a 2014 TV episode
