= Camp Orange (British TV series) =

- Genre: Reality television
- Presented by: Anna Williamson; Jamie Rickers; Denise Lewis (2011–2012)
- Country of origin: United Kingdom
- Original language: English
- No. of seasons: 2

Production
- Running time: 30 mins (inc. commercials)

Original release
- Network: Nickelodeon
- Release: 22 July 2011 – 2012

The British version of Camp Orange is a children's reality television show broadcast on Nickelodeon. The first season premiered on 22 July 2011. The series was hosted by Anna Williamson, Jamie Rickers and Denise Lewis.

This was the international version of Camp Orange, which is originally from Australia.

== Overview ==
The show stars four teams of best friends, selected from thousands of video audition entries that kids send in from across England, Scotland, Wales and Northern Ireland, vying for the outdoor adventure of a lifetime. They battle it out in messy physical challenges that test their wits and their teamwork skills in order to win prizes. In season 1, each team would vote for a team and supply a reason to the vote after each challenge. In the end, the team who received the most votes won a trip on the Nickelodeon Cruise. Season 2 has been said to be different, with it rumoured that viewers at home will vote for the winner.

Camp Orange UK did not return for a new series in 2013.

== Seasons ==
=== Season 1 (2011) ===
Camp Orange: Wrong Town was hosted by Anna Williamson, Jamie Rickers and Denise Lewis. on Nickelodeon (UK & Ireland). Season 1 premiered on 22 July 2011. The teams were Awesome 2SUM (Caleb and Aled), Double Trouble (Rosie and Rebecca), Yorky Corkies (Georgia and Elsie), and The Valley Commandos (Joe and Lucy). This season ended on 19 August 2011. The winning team were Double Trouble (Rosie and Rebecca)

=== Season 2 (2012) ===
Camp Orange returned to Nickelodeon UK in August 2012, titled The Lost Kingdom. Filming started on 25 June 2012 and finished on 30 June 2012. Auditions opened on Monday 12 March 2012 and closed on Saturday 14 April. The teams started to be announced on air from 2 July 2012. It premiered on Sunday 12 August, with new episodes every Sunday for 5 weeks. The premiere got under 59,000 views, not getting into the top ten of Nick's programming that week. The winners of this series were the Moon Waffles.

==== Contestants ====
| Team name | Type of Team | Members |
|---|---|---|
| Crazy Einsteins | Girl Team | Zoe & Tilly |
| Surf Turtles | Boy & Girl Team | Tom & Frankie |
| Moon Waffles | Girl Team | Hannah & Amanda-Jane |
| Noisy Ninjas | Boy Team | Zach & Chris |
