= Anna Williamson =

English television presenter

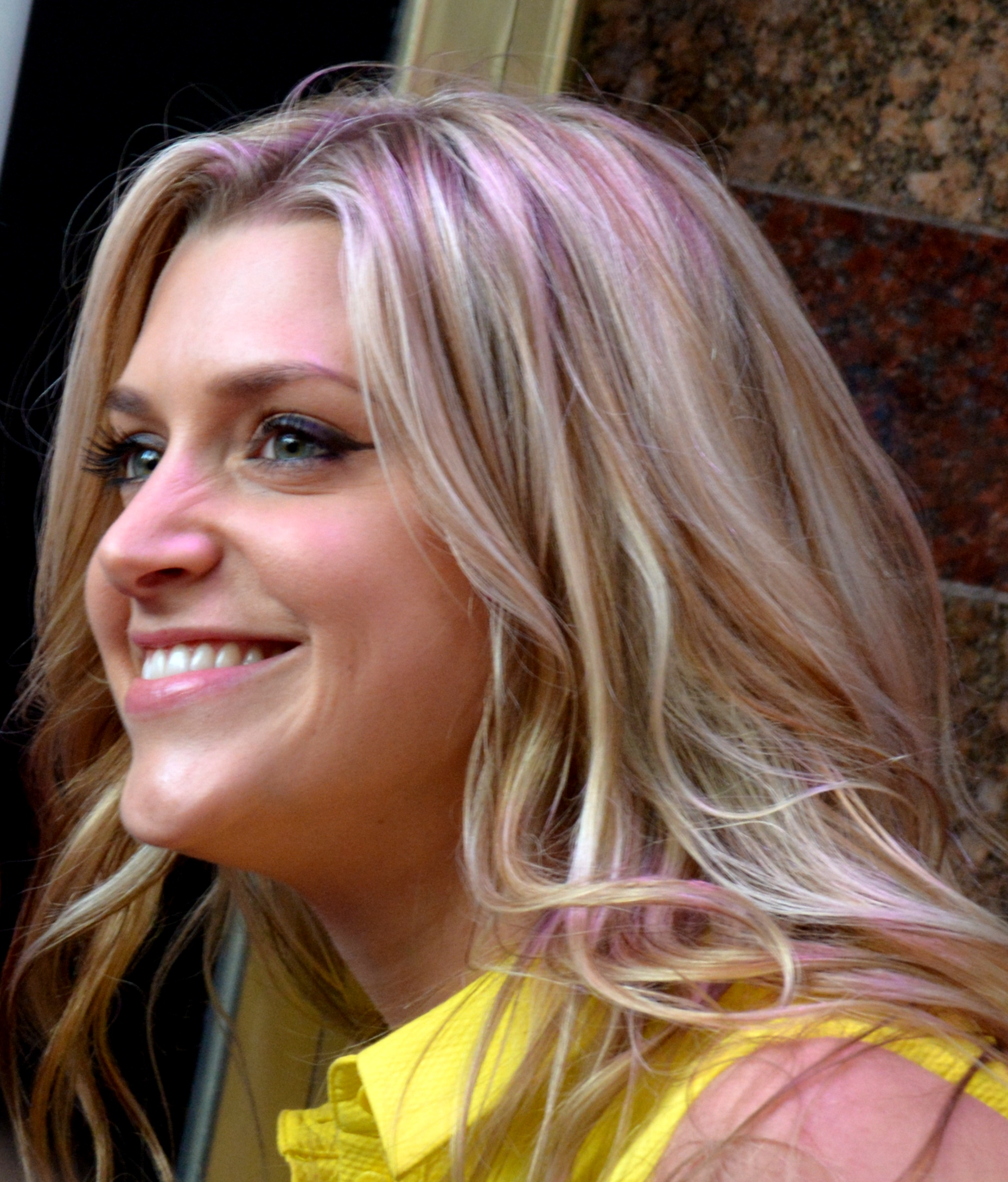
- Williamson in 2015
- Born: 23 July 1981 (age 45); England
- Occupations: Television presenter and dating agent
- Years active: 1997–present
- Spouse: Alex Di Pasquale (m. 2015)
- Children: 2
- Website: www.annawilliamson.co.uk

Anna Williamson (born 23 July 1981) is an English television presenter and dating agent. She is the former co-presenter of children's programmes Rescue Robots, Toonattik and Action Stations! on CITV. In 2019, Williamson began appearing as a dating agent on the E4 reality dating series Celebs Go Dating.

Williamson has also worked as an entertainment reporter and showbiz presenter on the ITV Breakfast programme Daybreak in 2011, as well as appearing on Big Brother's Bit on the Side as a reporter.

== Career ==
=== Singing ===
Williamson was a singer in the girl band Girl Force created by Steve Deakin-Davies, composer and producer for a Polygram project called "Blush" released in 1997 by Polygram Record Operations Ltd (no 536 291–4) which taught listeners how to sing and write music. It was created on the back of the success of the Spice Girls. Blush also released a single called "Feel my vibe" written and produced by Ricky Wilde, brother of Kim Wilde. The single was created by The Ambition Company and released on Solo records.

=== Television ===
Before joining GMTV in February 2005, Williamson presented Milkshake! on Channel 5 and a number of shows for the Disney Channel. In 2003, she presented a one-off CITV gameshow series called Rescue Robots and she guest-presented on CITV towards the end of the summer holidays of the same year. A year later in the autumn of 2004, she presented a CITV game show called Scary Sleepover.

On 6 March 2010, it was announced GMTV children's presenters Jamie Rickers and Williamson would be made redundant following ITV plc taking full control of GMTV, their last broadcast aired on 9 May 2010. Williamson and Rickers have since occasionally presented Nickelodeon strands.

From May 2011, she was an occasional entertainment reporter and TV Matters presenter for ITV Breakfast programme Daybreak.

In 2013, she appeared on This Morning as an agony aunt, and from 2013 to 2015, she appeared on Big Brother's Bit on the Side as a panellist and guest reporter.

In 2014, Williamson participated in the second series of the ITV celebrity diving show Splash!, making her first appearance in Heat 2, she made it through to the semi-final but no further, exiting the show on 8 February 2014.

| Stage | Air Date | Dive | Height | Judges' Scores | | | | Result |
| Stage | Air Date | Dive | Height | Andy Banks | Jo Brand | Leon Taylor | Total | Result |
| Heat 2 | 11 January 2014 | Forward pike | 10 metres | 8.0 | 8.5 | 7.5 | 24.0 | Saved by the judges |
| Semi-final | 1 February 2014 | Swan dive | 5 metres | 7.5 | 8.5 | 8.0 | 24.0 | Eliminated by the judges |
| Semi-final | 1 February 2014 | Forward 1 1/2 somersault with tuck | 3 metres (springboard) | 8.0 | 8.5 | 7.5 | 24.0 | Eliminated by the judges |

Note* Scores are out of a possible 30 points in total.

In 2019, Williamson appeared in the sixth series of E4 reality dating series Celebs Go Dating, as a dating expert.

=== Theatre ===
She appeared in Aladdin at The Capitol Theatre in Horsham, West Sussex which ran from 10 December 2010 until 3 January 2011.

She appeared in Dick Whittington at the New Wimbledon Theatre in Wimbledon, London.

She appeared in the theatre production of Cinderella as the lead at Milton Keynes Theatre in Milton Keynes which ran from 7 December 2012 until 6 January 2013.

=== Writing ===
In 2017, Williamson released her debut book, titled Breaking Mad. This was followed by a second book released in 2018, titled Breaking Mum and Dad. A third book, titled How Not to Lose It was released in March 2019 and Williamson's fourth book, titled Where is the Love? was released in February 2022.

=== Podcast ===
Anna presents LuAnna: The Podcast with Luisa Zissman.

== Personal life ==
Anna lives in Hertfordshire. She is qualified as a ChildLine counsellor and is one of their spokespeople along with the charity's founder Esther Rantzen. In December 2012, she hosted a ChildLine Gala concert alongside Jason Donovan. She is also an ambassador for The Prince's Trust and has cycled the Palace to Palace bike ride in October 2012. She is also an ambassador for mental health charity Mind. She has talked about being diagnosed with general anxiety disorder and panic disorder and signed up to have her placenta 'encapsulated' after the birth of her first child, because of theories it can help beat post-natal depression. On 8 July 2019, Williamson announced that she was pregnant and gave birth to her second child, a daughter, in December 2019.
