= Human Ken Doll =

The Human Ken Doll may refer to:

- Justin Jedlica, an American personality born in 1980 who has undergone a number of plastic surgeries
- Jessica Alves, a Brazilian personality born in 1983 who has also undergone a number of plastic surgeries
