= Patrick Monahan (comedian) =

Irish-Iranian comedian (born 1976)

- Born: 23 June 1976 (age 50); Ahvaz, Iran

Comedy career
- Years active: 2001–present
- Medium: Stand-up
- Subjects: Ethnicity; Universal Issues; Youth
- Website: patrickmonahan.co.uk

Notes
- Winner of Take the Mike in 2001; Winner of Show Me the Funny in 2011

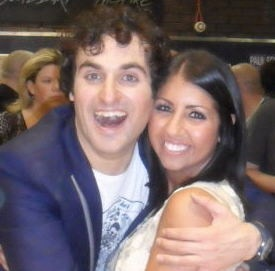
Patrick J Monahan with a fan, The Green Room at Teddington TV Studios

Patrick Monahan (born 23 June 1976) is an Irish-Iranian comedian, who won the television competition series Take the Mike in 2001 and Show Me the Funny in 2011. He has performed regularly at the Edinburgh Festival Fringe.

Monahan also holds the world record for "Longest Hug" at a time of 25 hours and 25 minutes, alongside fellow comedian Bob Slayer. They set this record at Edinburgh Fringe Festival in 2013.

== Background ==
Monahan's father was an Irish welder who met Monahan's mother in a bank in Ahvaz, Iran before the Iranian Revolution, where Monahan was born. When he was 3, he and his parents and siblings had to leave the country during the 1979 revolution; in the company of his brother and sister, the three-year-old Monahan had to pose as his grandparents' son, because only one boy per couple could leave the country.

Monahan has two passports – one Iranian and one Irish- using his Irish passport for traveling.

Patrick is in a relationship with his partner, with whom he lives in London. His partner has been cited as an inspiration for his “blue” comedy, and their life together in London is a recurring subject of his material.

== Career ==
=== Live performances ===
Monahan is a comedy festival regular and has performed solo shows in several cities, including Edinburgh, Glasgow, and Manchester, and also at most major venues throughout the UK. He has also performed across the globe in countries including Dubai, Luxembourg, and Germany.

He has done shows which refer to the occasional racism he encountered growing up in Middlesbrough.

During the Edinburgh Festival Fringe he has performed at the Gilded Balloon, including in August 2015 with his show The Disco Years. Also at the 2015 Edinburgh Fringe, he debuted a play which he wrote and in which he also performed.

Monahan's humor relies heavily on audience interaction and an animated story-telling style that draws on his experiences. He is known within comedy circles to "ignore the light", meaning he will eat into other comics' time or cause overall delays to the program.

=== Television ===
In August 2011, Monahan won the ITV stand-up comedy contest Show Me the Funny. Shortly after winning, he performed on The Comedy Annual, a one-off program celebrating the year in comedy.

On 10 March 2012, he participated in the BBC One program Let's Dance for Sport Relief. He danced to "Only Girl (In the World)" by Rihanna, but was eliminated by the public vote and did not go on to perform in the final the following week.

In January 2014, Monahan participated in the second series of the ITV celebrity diving show Splash!. His first appearance on the show was in the third heat, which aired live on 18 January 2014. Despite coming 2nd out of 5 contestants, he was the first celebrity diver to be eliminated in Heat 3. Also was the only celebrity to dive from the 10 meters board in his heat.

=== Stand-Up DVDs ===
Patrick Monahan Live was his Show Me The Funny winner's DVD. It was released on 28 November 2011 by 2 Entertain and produced by Big Talk Productions.

== Other work ==
Monahan became a patron of Zoe's Place Baby Hospice in Middlesbrough, after active fundraising for the charity, and runs the London Marathon, Great North Run, and Middlesbrough 10K annually in its aid. On 15 March 2013, Monahan visited Stokesley School, where he helped raise over £1,000 for Comic Relief. He did this by getting the entire school to do the Harlem shake.

In 2016, Monahan, along with numerous other celebrities, toured the UK to support Jeremy Corbyn's bid to become Prime Minister.
