= Splash! (British TV series) series 2 =

Splash!
- Series 2
- Presented by: Gabby Logan; Vernon Kay
- Judges: Andy Banks; Jo Brand; Leon Taylor
- Winner: Perri Kiely
- No. of episodes: 7

Release
- Original network: ITV
- Original release: 4 January – 15 February 2014

Series chronology
- ← Previous; Series 1

Splash! is a British television show which teaches celebrities the art of diving with the aid of Olympic diver Tom Daley. The second series began broadcasting on 4 January 2014 and ended on 15 February 2014. Gabby Logan and Vernon Kay returned to present, alongside resident judges Andy Banks, Jo Brand and Leon Taylor.

== Contestants ==
Rav Wilding was due to compete in the series but had to pull out before the series began due to injury, and was replaced by Martin Offiah. The line-up for the first heat was revealed on 23 December 2013, the line-up for the second heat was revealed at the end of the 4 January 2014 show. The line-up for the third heat was revealed on 8 January 2014.

Celebrity	Known for	Heat	Status
Ricky Groves	Former EastEnders actor	1	Eliminated 1st on 4 January 2014
Gemma Merna	Hollyoaks actress	1	Eliminated 2nd on 4 January 2014
Gemma Collins	The Only Way Is Essex star	1	Eliminated 3rd on 4 January 2014
Paul Ross	Television presenter	2	Eliminated 4th on 11 January 2014
Martin Offiah	Former professional rugby league footballer	2	Eliminated 5th on 11 January 2014
Toyah Willcox	Musician & actress	2	Eliminated 6th on 11 January 2014
Patrick Monahan	Stand-up comedian	3	Eliminated 7th on 18 January 2014
Paul Young	Singer & musician	3	Eliminated 8th on 18 January 2014
Penny Mordaunt	Conservative Party politician	3	Eliminated 9th on 18 January 2014
Jenny Eclair	Comedian & writer	4	Eliminated 10th on 25 January 2014
Pollyanna Woodward	The Gadget Show presenter	4	Eliminated 11th on 25 January 2014
Una Foden	The Saturdays singer	4	Eliminated 12th on 25 January 2014
Danielle Lloyd	Glamour model	1	Eliminated 13th on 1 February 2014
Michaela Strachan	Television presenter	3	Eliminated 14th on 1 February 2014
Austin Healey	Former rugby union player	4	Withdrew on 8 February 2014
Anna Williamson	Television presenter	2	Eliminated 15th on 8 February 2014
Dan Osborne	The Only Way Is Essex star	3	Fourth place on 15 February 2014
Keith Duffy	Boyzone singer	2	Third place on 15 February 2014
Richard Whitehead	Paralympic marathon runner	4	Runner-up on 15 February 2014
Perri Kiely	Diversity dancer	1	Winner on 15 February 2014

== Scoring chart ==
Celebrity	Place	1	2	3	4	5	6	Final
Perri Kiely	1	25.0	—	—	—	27.5+24.0+51.5	—	30.0+27.5=57.5
Richard Whitehead	2	—	—	—	27.0	—	25.0+25.5=50.5	29.0+27.5=56.5
Keith Duffy	3	—	24.5	—	—	21.5+23.0=44.5	—	25.0+26.0=51.0
Dan Osborne	4	—	—	23.5	—	—	22.5+24.5=47.0	27.0+27.5=54.5
Anna Williamson	5	—	24.0	—	—	—	24.0+24.0=48.0	
Austin Healey	6	—	—	—	24.5	—	WD	
Danielle Lloyd	7	—	—	20.0	—	20.0+20.0=40.0		
Michaela Strachan	8	21.0	—	—	—	22.5+22.0=44.5		
Una Foden	9	—	—	—	22.5			
Pollyanna Woodward	10	—	—	—	24.5			
Jenny Eclair	11	—	—	—	21.5			
Penny Mordaunt	12	—	—	22.5				
Paul Young	13	—	—	20.5				
Patrick Monahan	14	—	—	23.0				
Toyah Willcox	15	—	24.0					
Martin Offiah	16	—	18.0					
Paul Ross	17	—	21.5					
Gemma Collins	18	18.5						
Gemma Merna	19	18.0						
Ricky Groves	20	21.0						

Red numbers indicate the lowest score for each week
Green numbers indicate the highest score for each week
indicates the celebrities eliminated each week
indicates the celebrities in the Splash!-off each week
"—" indicates that the celebrity did not dive that week

== Live show details ==
=== Heat 1 (4 January) ===
Order	Celebrity	Judges' scores			Total	Scoreboard	Dive		Points			Public vote %	Result
Order	Celebrity	Banks	Brand	Taylor	Total	Scoreboard	Type	Height	Judges	Public	Total	Public vote %	Result
1	Michaela Strachan	7.0	7.5	6.5	21.0	=2nd	Inward dive with tuck	5 metre	4	2	6	6.27%	Saved by the judges
2	Ricky Groves	7.0	7.5	6.5	21.0	=2nd	Forward dive with tuck	5 metre	4	1	5	2.74%	Eliminated
3	Gemma Merna	6.0	6.5	5.5	18.0	5th	Pike fall	3 metre	2	3	5	8.14%	Eliminated
4	Perri Kiely	8.5	9.0	7.5	25.0	1st	Falling back somersault	10 metre	5	5	10	61.72%	Saved by public vote
5	Gemma Collins	6.0	7.0	5.5	18.5	4th	Pike fall	3 metre	3	4	7	21.14%	Eliminated by the judges

Judges' votes to save

- Brand: Gemma Collins
- Banks: Michaela Strachan
- Taylor: Michaela Strachan

=== Heat 2 (11 January) ===
Order	Celebrity	Judges' scores			Total	Scoreboard	Dive		Points			Public vote %	Result
Order	Celebrity	Banks	Brand	Taylor	Total	Scoreboard	Type	Height	Judges	Public	Total	Public vote %	Result
1	Keith Duffy	8.0	8.5	8.0	24.5	1st	Inward dive with tuck	7.5 metre	5	5	10	46.62%	Saved by public vote
2	Anna Williamson	8.0	8.5	7.5	24.0	=2nd	T-start forward pike fall	10 metre	4	3	7	13.71%	Saved by the judges
3	Paul Ross	7.0	8.0	6.5	21.5	4th	Forward dive with tuck	5 metre	3	1	4	4.20%	Eliminated
4	Martin Offiah	6.0	6.5	5.5	18.0	5th	Forward pike fall	5 metre	2	2	4	8.13%	Eliminated
5	Toyah Willcox	8.0	8.5	7.5	24.0	=2nd	Inward dive with tuck	5 metre	4	4	8	27.35%	Eliminated by the judges

Judges' votes to save

- Taylor: Anna Williamson
- Brand: Toyah Willcox
- Banks: Anna Williamson

=== Heat 3 (18 January) ===
Order	Celebrity	Judges' scores			Total	Scoreboard	Dive		Points			Public vote %	Result
Order	Celebrity	Banks	Brand	Taylor	Total	Scoreboard	Type	Height	Judges	Public	Total	Public vote %	Result
1	Patrick Monahan	7.5	8.0	7.5	23.0	2nd	Forward 1 1/2 somersault with tuck	10 metre	4	1	5	14.21%	Eliminated
2	Paul Young	7.0	7.5	6.0	20.5	4th	Pike fall	7.5 metre	2	2	4	15.28%	Eliminated
3	Penny Mordaunt	7.5	8.0	7.0	22.5	3rd	Backward dive	7.5 metre	3	3	6	17.39%	Eliminated by the judges
4	Dan Osborne	8.0	8.5	7.0	23.5	1st	Backwards somersault	10 metre	5	4	9	22.17%	Saved by public vote
5	Danielle Lloyd	6.5	7.5	6.0	20.0	5th	Forward pike fall	5 metre	1	5	6	30.96%	Saved by the judges

Judges' votes to save

- Brand: Danielle Lloyd
- Banks: Danielle Lloyd
- Taylor: Danielle Lloyd

=== Heat 4 (25 January) ===
Order	Celebrity	Judges' scores			Total	Scoreboard	Dive		Points			Public vote %	Result
Order	Celebrity	Banks	Brand	Taylor	Total	Scoreboard	Type	Height	Judges	Public	Total	Public vote %	Result
1	Pollyanna Woodward	8.0	8.5	8.0	24.5	=2nd	Forward 1 1/2 somersault pike	7.5 metre	4	2	6	7.92%	Eliminated
2	Austin Healey	8.0	8.5	8.0	24.5	=2nd	Back 1 1/2 somersault with twist	7.5 metre	4	4	8	15.10%	Saved by the judges (later withdrew)
3	Jenny Eclair	7.0	8.0	6.5	21.5	5th	Forward pike fall	5 metre	2	1	3	3.47%	Eliminated
4	Una Foden	7.5	8.0	7.0	22.5	4th	Forward dive with tuck	5 metre	3	3	6	12.17%	Eliminated by the judges
5	Richard Whitehead	9.0	9.0	9.0	27.0	1st	Armstand forward dive	10 metre	5	5	10	61.33%	Saved by public vote

Judges' votes to save

- Taylor: Austin Healey
- Brand: Austin Healey
- Banks: Austin Healey

=== Semi-final 1 (1 February) ===
Order	Celebrity	Judges' scores			Total	Grand total	Scoreboard	Dive		Points			Public vote %	Result
Order	Celebrity	Banks	Brand	Taylor	Total	Grand total	Scoreboard	Type	Height	Judges	Public	Total	Public vote %	Result
1	Keith Duffy	7.0	7.5	7.0	21.5	44.5	=2nd	T-start forward pike fall	10 metre	3	3	6	23.15%	Saved by the judges
1	Keith Duffy	7.5	8.0	7.5	23.0	44.5	=2nd	Forward 1 1/2 somersault with tuck	5 metre	3	3	6	23.15%	Saved by the judges
2	Danielle Lloyd	6.5	7.5	6.0	20.0	40.0	4th	Forward 1 1/2 somersault	3 metre springboard	2	1	3	4.89%	Eliminated
2	Danielle Lloyd	6.5	7.0	6.5	20.0	40.0	4th	Forward pike fall	7.5 metre	2	1	3	4.89%	Eliminated
3	Michaela Strachan	7.5	8.0	7.0	22.5	44.5	=2nd	Forward 1 1/2 somerault pike	3 metre springboard	3	2	5	11.89%	Eliminated by the judges
3	Michaela Strachan	7.0	8.0	7.0	22.0	44.5	=2nd	Inward dive piked	7.5 metre	3	2	5	11.89%	Eliminated by the judges
4	Perri Kiely	9.5	9.0	9.0	27.5	51.5	1st	Inward 1 1/2 somersault with tuck	7.5 metre	4	4	8	59.07%	Saved by the public
4	Perri Kiely	7.5	8.5	8.0	24.0	51.5	1st	Forward 1 1/2 somersault with twist	5 metre	4	4	8	59.07%	Saved by the public

Judges' votes to save

- Banks: Keith Duffy
- Brand: Michaela Strachan
- Taylor: Keith Duffy

=== Semi-final 2 (8 February) ===
Order	Celebrity	Judges' scores			Total	Grand total	Scoreboard	Dive		Points			Public vote %	Result
Order	Celebrity	Banks	Brand	Taylor	Total	Grand total	Scoreboard	Type	Height	Judges	Public	Total	Public vote %	Result
1	Austin Healey	*	*	*	*	*	*	*	*	*	*	*	*	Withdrew
1	Austin Healey	*	*	*	*	*	*	*	*	*	*	*	*	Withdrew
2	Dan Osborne	7.5	8.0	7.0	22.5	47.0	3rd	Forward somersault with twist	7.5 metre	1	1	2	20.68%	Saved by the judges
2	Dan Osborne	8.0	8.5	8.0	24.5	47.0	3rd	Arm stand forward somersault pike	7.5 metre	1	1	2	20.68%	Saved by the judges
3	Richard Whitehead	8.0	9.0	8.0	25.0	50.5	1st	Arm stand forward dive	10 metre	3	3	6	45.05%	Saved by the public
3	Richard Whitehead	8.5	8.5	8.5	25.5	50.5	1st	Arm stand backwards dive	7.5 metre	3	3	6	45.05%	Saved by the public
4	Anna Williamson	7.5	8.5	8.0	24.0	48.0	2nd	Swan dive	5 metre	2	2	4	34.27%	Eliminated by the judges
4	Anna Williamson	8.0	8.5	7.5	24.0	48.0	2nd	Forward 1 1/2 somersault with tuck	3 metre springboard	2	2	4	34.27%	Eliminated by the judges

* Due to injury Healey did not take part in the live show and therefore had to withdraw from the competition.

Judges' votes to save

- Taylor: Dan Osborne
- Brand: Anna Williamson
- Banks: Dan Osborne

=== Final (15 February) ===
Order	Celebrity	Judges' scores			Total	Grand total	Scoreboard	Dive		Points	Public vote %	Result
Order	Celebrity	Banks	Brand	Taylor	Total	Grand total	Scoreboard	Type	Height	Points	Public vote %	Result
1	Perri Kiely	10.0	10.0	10.0	30.0	57.5	1st	2 1/2 somersault with tuck	3 metre springboard	4	60.97%	Winner
1	Perri Kiely	9.0	9.5	9.0	27.5	57.5	1st	Inward 1 1/2 somersault with tuck synchronised	10 metre	4	60.97%	Winner
2	Keith Duffy	8.0	8.5	8.5	25.0	51.0	4th	Forward 1 1/2 somersault with tuck	7.5 metre	2	12.75%	Third place
2	Keith Duffy	8.5	9.0	8.5	26.0	51.0	4th	Inward dive with tuck synchronised	7.5 metre	2	12.75%	Third place
3	Richard Whitehead	9.5	10.0	9.5	29.0	56.5	2nd	Arm-stand forward somersault piked	7.5 metre	3	17.89%	Runner-up
3	Richard Whitehead	9.0	9.5	9.0	27.5	56.5	2nd	Armstand backward dive synchronised	10 metre	3	17.89%	Runner-up
4	Dan Osborne	9.0	9.5	8.5	27.0	54.5	3rd	Backward 1 1/2 somersault with twist	3 metre springboard	1	8.39%	Fourth place
4	Dan Osborne	9.0	9.5	9.0	27.5	54.5	3rd	Forward dive with tuck synchronised	7.5 metre	1	8.39%	Fourth place

== Ratings ==
Show	Date	Official ITV rating (millions)	ITV weekly rank	Share (%)	Official ITV HD rating (millions)	Total ITV viewers (millions)
Heat 1	4 January	4.26	18	20.4	0.78	5.04
Heat 2	11 January	3.43	27	14.4	—N/a	3.43
Heat 3	18 January	3.64	25	15.9	—N/a	3.64
Heat 4	25 January	3.50	24	16.2	—N/a	3.50
Semi-final 1	1 February	3.62	20	16.0	—N/a	3.62
Semi-final 2	8 February	Under 2.86	Outside top 30	11.9	—N/a	Under 2.86
Final	15 February	3.52	25	16.8	—N/a	3.52
Series average	2014	TBC	—N/a	—N/a	TBC	—N/a
