= Show Me the Funny =

- Directed by: Michael Cumming
- Presented by: Jason Manford
- Judges: Main Judges; Alan Davies; Kate Copstick; Guest Judges; Jimmy Tarbuck; Bob Mortimer; Ross Noble; Jo Brand; Johnny Vegas; Cannon and Ball
- Country of origin: United Kingdom
- Original language: English
- No. of series: 1
- No. of episodes: 7

Production
- Producers: Kenton Allen; Matthew Justice
- Running time: 60mins (inc. adverts)
- Production company: Big Talk Productions

Original release
- Network: ITV
- Release: 18 July – 25 August 2011

Related
- Last Comic Standing

Show Me the Funny is a British reality show on ITV, in which a group of ten comedians of varying experience visit ten cities around the UK, performing tasks that are somehow meant to equip them with local knowledge to work into five-minute-long new live routines, which they then showcase in front of a live audience.

At the end of each show, one contestant was voted off by the judging panel of Alan Davies, Kate Copstick and a different guest judge in each city, with a live final at the Hammersmith Apollo on 25 August 2011. The eventual winner of the competition won a nationwide tour (with support from two of the runners-up) and their own DVD released in the run-up to Christmas.

An unrelated show with the same title aired in the United States on Fox Family.

== Contestants ==
=== Ignacio Lopez ===
24-year-old Spanish barman Ignacio Lopez got a job as an usher in a cinema, to get him closer to short films. His colleagues at the cinema pushed him into comedy at the end of 2009. Ignacio was eliminated in week one. He went on to have a very successful career, appearing on Live at the Apollo in 2023.

=== Prince Abdi ===
Somalian-born 28-year-old Prince Abdi is a former primary school teacher who was once on Millwall FC’s books. Prince won the Your Comedy Star competition at the Edinburgh Festival in 2007. He has been on the circuit for four years and recently came second in the Barbican New Act of the Year competition. Prince was eliminated in week two.

=== Cole Parker ===
41-year-old Cole Parker started his stand-up career at the age of six after entering a talent contest in Norfolk, where he came second. He is now a regular on the stand-up circuit. Cole was eliminated in week three.

=== Rudi Lickwood ===
49-year-old grandfather Rudi Lickwood has been on the circuit for two decades after first coming onto the scene as an Eddie Murphy impersonator in 1989. Through this, he traveled all over the world, before developing his own stand-up routine. Rudi was eliminated with week four.

=== Alfie Moore ===
47-year-old Alfie Moore is a serving police sergeant; he took up comedy as a hobby three years ago, after a night out at a local comedy gig with his wife. He is now performing regularly and over the past two and a half years has done more than 250 comedy gigs and 50 after-dinner speeches. Alfie was eliminated in week five.

=== Ellie Taylor ===
27-year-old former model Ellie Taylor from Essex decided to go into comedy after seeing a friend perform a five-minute set. A keen drama student at school, Ellie went on to study at York University and gave up her job in corporate events to concentrate on comedy full-time. Ellie was eliminated in week six, along with Stuart. She is now hosting BBC Three's Snog Marry Avoid? and is a team captain on Fake Reaction.

=== Stuart Goldsmith ===
33-year-old Stuart Goldsmith ran away from home to join the circus when he was young, but upon discovering that the circus entailed more press-ups than he deemed reasonable, he fled. He moved on to street performance and acting, before settling on stand-up. He has gone on to perform all over the UK and Europe. Stuart was eliminated in week six, along with Ellie. He now hosts the popular podcast 'The Comedian's Comedian' interviewing comedians about their craft.

=== Tiffany Stevenson ===
33-year-old Tiffany "Tiff" Stevenson from London started in stand-up as the WAG character Savannah Dior, and now performs stand-up as herself. She also runs and co-hosts London’s Old Rope new material night. Tiffany finished third in the live final.

=== Dan Mitchell ===
34-year-old charity worker Dan Mitchell is a former undertaker from Wales who cites ‘boredom’ as the reason for his move into stand-up five years ago. Dan has since performed more than 500 gigs after starting in small pubs in the rural Welsh countryside. Dan finished second in the live final.

=== Patrick Monahan ===
35-year-old Patrick Monahan was brought up on Teesside, and is of Irish-Iranian descent. Patrick is a stalwart of the circuit who has performed around the world, often as a warm-up act. Patrick won the live final, and the competition.

== Episodes ==
=== One ===
The first episode of Show Me The Funny came from Liverpool, where the ten contenders were sent out to get to know the city and its people. This was so they could then write five minutes of brand new material to perform at a nerve-wracking gig in front of an all-female audience.

They then faced a panel of comedian Alan Davies, comedy critic Kate Copstick and guest judge, Liverpool legend Jimmy Tarbuck. The panel then decided who made the cut for the next gig, and sent Ignacio home.

=== Two ===
The nine remaining hopefuls head to Catterick Garrison in North Yorkshire, Europe's largest military base, where they received two days of training with the Army before performing for members of the Scots Guards regiment. Davies, Copstick and guest judge Bob Mortimer then decided to eliminate Prince.

=== Three ===
The eight remaining comics headed to a Birmingham secondary school, The Streetly Academy. Davies, Copstick and guest judge Ross Noble sent Cole home.

=== Four ===
The seven remaining comics tried their hand at hospital radio in Watford, where they created a new routine to be broadcast before performing for an audience of doctors, nurses and medical staff. Davies, Copstick and guest judge Jo Brand gave advice to Stuart, Rudi and Ellie, before eliminating Rudi from the competition.

=== Five ===
The six remaining contenders headed to South Wales, where they had to organise a night of entertainment for locals at a pub in Pontypridd, before performing new material for a group of rugby players. Davies, Copstick and guest judge Johnny Vegas eliminated Alfie Moore from the competition.

=== Six ===
The five remaining comics made their final stop of the tour to Blackpool. The guest judges were Cannon and Ball, and Ellie and Stuart were eliminated.

=== Seven ===
The final three remaining comics performed live at the Hammersmith Apollo in the live final on 25 August. The show was won by Patrick Monahan, with Dan Mitchell finishing second and Tiffany Stevenson finishing third.

== Ratings ==
| # | Airdate | Total viewers | Audience share |
|---|---|---|---|
| 1 | 18 July 2011 | 2,640,000 | 10.7% |
| 2 | 25 July 2011 | 2,480,000 | 10.6% |
| 3 | 1 August 2011 | 1,930,000 | 8.1% |
| 4 | 8 August 2011 | 1,870,000 | 7.5% |
| 5 | 15 August 2011 | 1,880,000 | 8.1% |
| 6 | 22 August 2011 | 1,630,000 | 6.7% |
| 7 | 25 August 2011 | 2,460,000 | 10.9% |
