= The Speaker (TV series) =

- Genre: Entertainment
- Narrated by: Jane Horrocks
- Composer: Rory Dow
- Country of origin: United Kingdom
- Original language: English
- No. of seasons: 1
- No. of episodes: 8

Production
- Executive producer: Kieron Collins
- Producer: Darrell Olsen
- Editors: John Edwards; Toby Jones; Ian Wilson
- Running time: 8 x 60mins
- Production company: BBC Manchester

Original release
- Network: BBC Two
- Release: 7 April – 29 April 2009

The Speaker is a 2009 British television series, broadcast on BBC Two. It is a talent show type series that aimed to find the best young speaker in the United Kingdom. The show is narrated by Jane Horrocks. The three judges are stand-up comedian Jo Brand, former basketball player and psychologist John Amaechi and Jeremy Stockwell.

Regional auditions were held in London, Glasgow, Cardiff and Manchester. 160 young people were invited to auditions after sending in videos of themselves speaking. The participants had to be aged between 14 and 18. Only 5 participants are allowed through to the next round for each region in episodes 1 & 2. Then the 20 who get through are reduced to 8 after a number of challenges in episode 3.

== Airing ==
The first episode aired on 7 April 2009. The first episode featured the Glasgow and London auditions, while the second show included the Manchester and Cardiff auditions.

== Episode list ==
Episode	Subject	Airdate
1	London and Glasgow auditions	7 April 2009
2	Manchester and Cardiff auditions	8 April 2009
3	Deborah Meaden coaches the Speakers on how to speak with conviction. The tasks were giving an impromptu speech at Speakers Corner and trying to 'sell' jars full of air but labelled emotions such as 'Courage', 'Happiness' and similar.	14 April 2009
4	Earl Spencer invites the Speakers to Althorp House where they explore the craft of information giving. The speakers gave an 8-minute tour of a room they were assigned to.	15 April 2009
5	Journalist and broadcaster Kate Silverton teaches the Speakers the skills of storytelling. They then had to present a 2-minute news segment from London Zoo.	21 April 2009
6	Tony Blair's former Director of Communications and Speech Writer Alastair Campbell, demonstrates the subtleties of persuasion. The speakers then prepared for a mock election on local issues.	22 April 2009
7	Semi-Final: The speakers were mentored by the three judges on the subject of inspiration. This was demonstrated by giving a speech at City Hall in London which was being broadcast on giant screen to various city centres around the UK.	28 April 2009
8	Final: Working with UNICEF UK, the final 3 speakers were sent to Malawi to meet children in poverty there and research for their final speech; a 5-minute presentation on children's rights.	29 April 2009

== Finalists ==
Name	Home Town	Age	Final Episode
Duncan	Bristol	14	Finalist (Winner)
Irene	Bristol	17	Finalist
Kay Kay	London	15	Finalist
Jordan	Sunderland	15	7 (Semi Final)
Maria	Glasgow	16	7 (Semi Final)
Haroon	London	17	6
Thomas	Leeds	16	5
Fahmida	London	16	4
