= Alfie Moore (comedian) =

English police officer, broadcaster and comedian

Alfie Moore (Comedian)
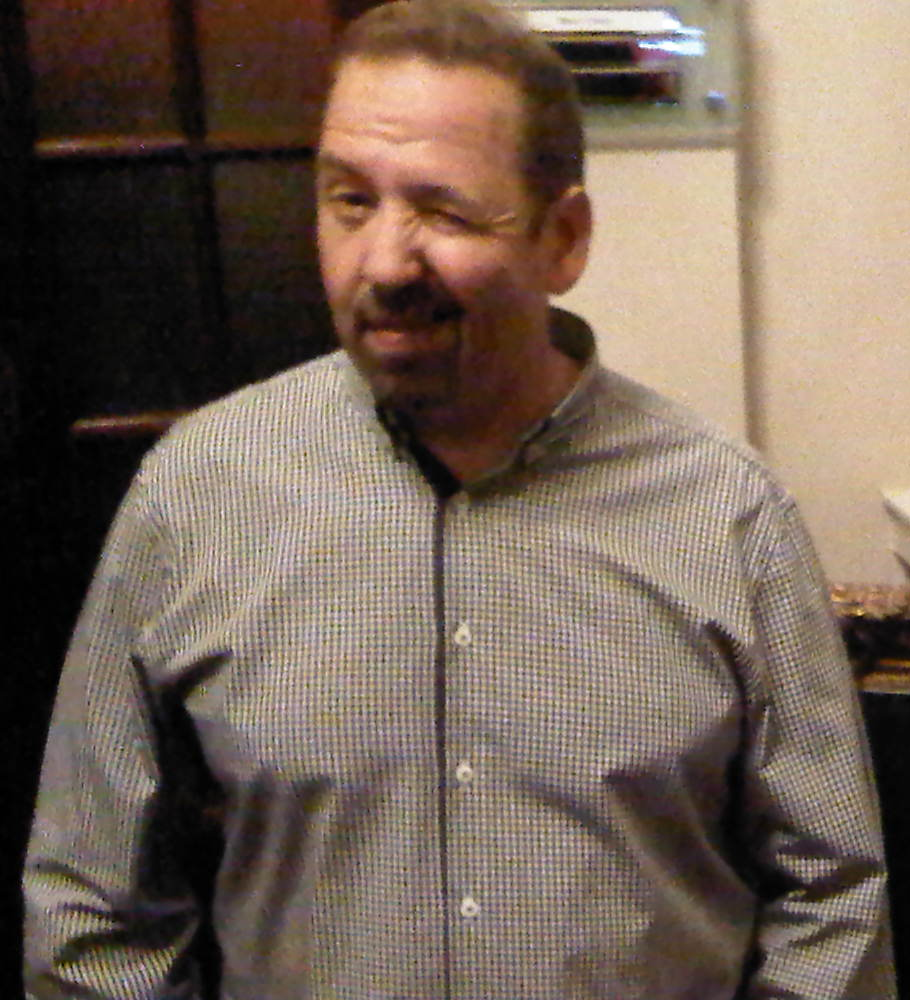
- Moore in 2013
- Born: 1968 (age 57–58); Sheffield

Comedy career
- Years active: 2010–present
- Medium: Stand-up, presenter, radio
- Genre: Comedy
- Website: Official website

Alfie Moore is an English ex-police officer, writer, stand-up comedian and radio presenter.

== Career ==
Moore spent over twenty years on the Humberside Police force before turning to stand up comedy.

Moore first appeared on the ITV show Show Me the Funny hosted by Jason Manford and has since appeared as a guest on Channel 5's The Wright Stuff, the Newspaper Review on Sky News, BBC's Comic Relief, ITV News Calendar and BBC's Look North. More recently he has been a presenter on the Channel 5 show Caught on Camera.

Moore has been a guest on radio programmes including Today (BBC Radio 4), The Richard Bacon Show on BBC Radio 5 Live, The Jeremy Vine Show on BBC Radio 2 as well as presenting his own stand-up comedy show on BBC Radio 4 called Alfie Moore – It's a Fair Cop, which is on series 9 As of May 2025.

Moore has taken four shows to the Edinburgh Festival. In 2012 I Predicted a Riot and 2013 Viva Alf's Vegas with Phil McIntyre Ents as promoter, and in 2014 The Naked Stun with Mick Perrin Worldwide as promoter which sold out for 25 nights and was awarded the Edinburgh Fringe laurel for a sell-out show. Moore's 2015 Edinburgh Festival show was called Alfie Moore - A Fair Cop Stands Up. Later tours included The Naked Stun and Getting Away with Murder. A recent tour, Fair Cop Unleashed, is based on a true story. His latest tour (2026), Acopalypse Now (sic), continues the proven crowd-pleasing formula.

Moore has supported Sarah Millican, Russell Kane and Milton Jones on their national comedy tours.
