= Jo Brand's Big Splash =

- Directed by: Sam Grace
- Presented by: Jo Brand
- Narrated by: Jo Brand
- Country of origin: United Kingdom
- Original language: English
- No. of series: 1
- No. of episodes: 5 (list of episodes)

Production
- Production location: Hackney Empire (stand-up)
- Editor: Simon Hornbrook
- Running time: 60 minutes
- Production companies: Doghouse Media; What Larks Productions

Original release
- Network: Dave; Dave HD
- Release: 22 September – 20 October 2011

Jo Brand's Big Splash is a British television series produced by Doghouse Media and What Larks! Productions for Dave. The show was part of Dave's investment into original comedy shows. Presented by comedian Jo Brand, it combined her stand-up comedy with various tasks involving water. The first episode originally aired on 22 September 2011, and the last episode aired on 20 October 2011.

== Overview ==
Jo Brand performs a stand-up comedy routine to a live studio audience at the Hackney Empire. This is combined with specially shot films of Brand visiting various people in the United Kingdom who passionately love water. In each episode, another comedian joins Brand to take part in a water related task. The final episode was an extended compilation of all the stand-up sections of the series.

== Episode list ==
No.	Guest	Original release date	Viewers	Weekly ranking (for Dave)
1	Sean Lock	22 September 2011	417,000	3
2	Bill Bailey	29 September 2011	217,000	10
3	Rich Hall	6 October 2011	Under 253,000	Outside top 10
4	Meera Syal	13 October 2011	328,000	9
5	N/A	20 October 2011	326,000	5
