= Hard Spell =

- Genre: Game show
- Presented by: Eamonn Holmes; Nina Hossain; Mishal Husain
- Country of origin: United Kingdom
- Original language: English
- No. of series: 2
- No. of episodes: 6

Production
- Running time: 30 minutes (regular); 60 minutes (grand finals)

Original release
- Network: BBC One
- Release: 29 November 2004 – 31 December 2005

Related
- Star Spell

Hard Spell is a United Kingdom televised spelling bee programme for children between the ages of eleven and fourteen, presented by Eamonn Holmes, with Nina Hossain reading the words. It was first broadcast on BBC One in late 2004. Heats were held in different parts of the country leading to the grand final, at the end of which Gayathri Kumar was crowned Britain's best young speller.

Notable spellers apart from Gayathri included Nisha Abraham-Thomas from Wolverhampton, Mark Jackson from Cambridge, Dominic Harvey from Bath and Sarah Williams from Penzance.

All of the televised runners-up in 2004 received a signed photograph of Eamonn Holmes and other Hard Spell memorabilia.

As the show was such a success, Hard Spell returned to television screens at Christmas 2005 with a different age group (11-13) but the same presenters, Eamonn Holmes and Mishal Husain. In the final, the winner was Niall O'Neill from Northern Ireland who won £10,000 worth of holiday vouchers and media equipment for his school. In 2005 the memorabilia contained a Hard Spell T-shirt, mug, pencil case, pen and a dictionary signed by the presenter.

== Transmissions ==
Series	Episodes	Originally released	
Series	Episodes	First released	Last released
1	6	29 November 2004	5 December 2004
2	6	26 December 2005	31 December 2005

== Star Spell ==
Soon after, the BBC produced a one-off episode, or pilot, called Star Spell, which followed the same format but had celebrities taking part rather than children. This was again presented by Eamonn Holmes, with Nina Hossain reading the words. The one-off episode was won by Richard Whiteley. In late 2005, the BBC broadcast a full series of Star Spell, again presented by Eamonn Holmes but Mishal Husain took over from Nina as word pronouncer.

For the series (October 2005), the title of Star Spell Champion was won by Vanessa Feltz.

No. overall	No. in series	Title	Contestants	Winner	Original release date
1	–	Pilot	Jeremy Bowen; Jo Brand; Richard McCourt; Penny Smith; Richard Whiteley	Richard Whiteley	3 January 2005
2	1	Episode 1	Fiona Bruce; Vanessa Feltz; Brian Turner; Mark Lawrenson	Vanessa Feltz	10 October 2005
3	2	Episode 2	Adam Best; Arlene Phillips; Phil Taylor; Gary Waldhorn	Gary Waldhorn	11 October 2005
4	3	Episode 3	David Grant; Clive Swift; Christopher Timothy; Nina Wadia	Nina Wadia	12 October 2005
5	4	Episode 4	Jennie Bond; Jennie McAlpine; Bernie Nolan; David Spinx	Jennie Bond	13 October 2005
6	5	Episode 5	Anton du Beke; John Parrott; Steve Rider; Carol Smillie	Steve Rider	14 October 2005
7	6	Finale	Jennie Bond; Vanessa Feltz; Steve Rider; Nina Wadia; Gary Waldhorn	Vanessa Feltz	15 October 2005
