= Jamie Rickers =

English television presenter (born 1974)

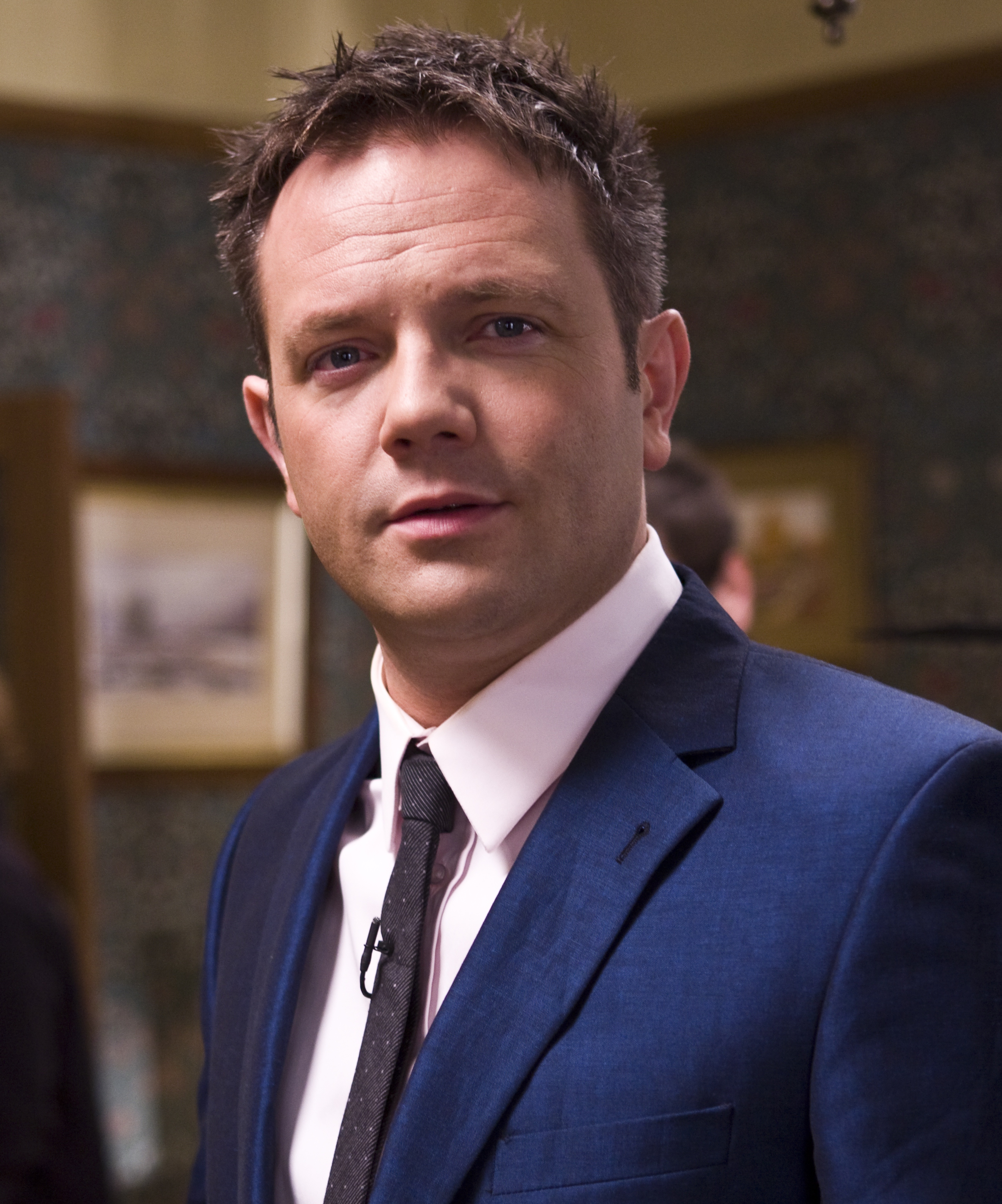
- Born: 21 May 1974 (age 52); Chelmsford, Essex, England
- Years active: 1997–2012
- Known for: Up on the Roof; Toonattik; Prove it!
- Children: 2

Jamie Rickers (born 21 May 1974) is an English former television presenter, best known as the co-presenter of children's programmes Prove It!, Toonattik and Up on the Roof on CITV. His hobbies include swimming and water-skiing.

== Career ==
Rickers career began in 1997 as a researcher/co-ordinator for London Weekend Television. In 1999 Rickers began TV presenting beginning with the short-lived series Find a Fortune, and then Rickers began presenting links for the digital children's channel Carlton Kids then joined GMTV as a continuity announcer for their children's programming. Rickers presented Up on the Roof between 2001 and 2005. From 2005 to 2010, Rickers presented Toonattik on CITV.

After moving from CITV to Nickelodeon, presenting such shows as Camp Orange and, with Anna Williamson, Jamie & Anna's Big Weekend he presented the Judo and Wrestling heats in the London 2012 Olympics; in 2016 he worked for global and foreign exchange client Vlopper, and during the COVID-19 pandemic sold face masks.

== Filmography ==
=== Television ===
Year	Title	Role
1999	Carlton Kids	Presenter
1999	Find a Fortune	Presenter
2001–2005	Up on the Roof	Presenter
2005-2007	Prove It!	Presenter
2005–2010	Toonattik	Presenter
2010	Nickelodeon UK (Jamie and Anna's U Pick Live/Big Weekend)	Presenter
2011	Anubis Unlocked	Presenter
2011–2012	Camp Orange (UK & Ireland)	Himself
