= Splash! (British TV series) =

British reality television series

- Genre: Reality
- Written by: Adam Bostock-Smith
- Directed by: Julia Knowles
- Presented by: Gabby Logan; Vernon Kay
- Starring: Tom Daley
- Judges: Andy Banks; Jo Brand; Leon Taylor
- Narrated by: Alan March
- Original language: English
- No. of series: 2
- No. of episodes: 12

Production
- Executive producers: Shirley Jones; Darren Smith
- Producers: Aaron Kidd; Gyles Neville
- Production locations: Inspire: Luton Sports Village, Luton, Bedfordshire
- Running time: 90 minutes (inc. advertisements)
- Production company: Twofour

Original release
- Network: ITV
- Release: 5 January 2013 – 15 February 2014

Related
- Celebrity Splash!

Splash! is a British reality television series that follows celebrities learning diving. The celebrities performed each week in front of a panel of judges and a live audience in an Olympic-size diving pool with the result each week partly determined by public vote. Gabby Logan and Vernon Kay presented the show, whilst Team GB Olympic gold medal-winning diver Tom Daley was the expert mentor to the celebrities. It was filmed at the Inspire: Luton Sports Village, which is based in Stopsley, Luton.

The show premiered on ITV on 5 January 2013, winning the ratings battle for its 7:15–8:15 p.m. slot with an average audience of 5.6 million viewers, a network share of 23.6%, however, it was cancelled on 24 June 2014 after two series.

The format for the show originated from the Celebrity Splash! franchise created by television production company Eyeworks in the Netherlands, and was broadcast on SBS6 as Sterren Springen Op Zaterdag (Celebrities Jumping on Saturday).

== Format ==
The show was broadcast live on ITV on Saturday evenings, and was presented by Gabby Logan and Vernon Kay. In the show, celebrities competed against each other, performing dives in order to impress a judging panel and the viewing public. The series consisted of heats where two celebrities from each go into the semi-finals, and then followed by a live final on successive Saturdays.

== Series overview ==
Two series were broadcast, as summarised below.

Series	Start	Finish	Winner	Runner-up	Third place	Fourth place	Hosts	Judges
1	5 January 2013	2 February 2013	Eddie "The Eagle" Edwards	Jake Canuso	Linda Barker	—N/a	Gabby Logan; Vernon Kay	Andy Banks; Jo Brand; Leon Taylor
2	4 January 2014	15 February 2014	Perri Kiely	Richard Whitehead	Keith Duffy	Dan Osborne	Gabby Logan; Vernon Kay	Andy Banks; Jo Brand; Leon Taylor

== Main series results ==
=== Series 1 (2013) ===
The first series began airing on 5 January 2013 and ran for 5 weeks ending on 2 February 2013.

The contestants for the first series were:

Celebrity	Known for	Status
Jade Ewen	Singer	Eliminated 1st
Helen Lederer	Comedian, actress & writer	Eliminated 2nd
Jenni Falconer	TV presenter	Eliminated 3rd
Diarmuid Gavin	Garden designer	Eliminated 4th
Caprice	Model and actress	Eliminated 5th
Joey Essex	Reality TV star	Eliminated 6th
Donna Air	TV presenter	Eliminated 7th
Dom Joly	Comedian and actor	Eliminated 8th
Tina Malone	Actress	Eliminated 9th
Anthony Ogogo	Olympic professional boxer	Withdrew
Charlotte Jackson	Journalist and TV presenter	Eliminated 10th
Omid Djalili	Comedian and actor	Eliminated 10th
Linda Barker	Interior designer and TV presenter	Third place
Jake Canuso	Actor	Runner-up
Eddie "The Eagle" Edwards	Olympic ski jumper	Winner

=== Series 2 (2014) ===
On 4 February 2013, a second series was confirmed; it began airing on 4 January 2014 and ran for 7 weeks, ending on 15 February 2014.

The contestants for the second series were:

Celebrity	Known for	Status
Gemma Merna	Actress	Eliminated 1st
Ricky Groves	Actor	Eliminated 2nd
Gemma Collins	Reality TV star	Eliminated 3rd
Martin Offiah	Rugby player	Eliminated 4th
Paul Ross	Journalist	Eliminated 5th
Toyah Willcox	Singer	Eliminated 6th
Patrick Monahan	Comedian	Eliminated 7th
Paul Young	Singer	Eliminated 8th
Penny Mordaunt	Politician	Eliminated 9th
Pollyanna Woodward	TV presenter	Eliminated 10th
Jenny Eclair	Comedian	Eliminated 11th
Una Healy	Singer	Eliminated 12th
Michaela Strachan	TV presenter	Eliminated 13th
Danielle Lloyd	Model	Eliminated 14th
Austin Healey	Rugby player	Withdrew
Anna Williamson	TV presenter	Eliminated 15th
Dan Osborne	Reality TV star	Fourth place
Keith Duffy	Singer	Third place
Richard Whitehead	Paralympic runner	Runner-up
Perri Kiely	Dancer	Winner

== Reception ==
The show received generally poor reviews from critics after its premiere, including "utterly awful", "a new low for television" and "probably the worst programme ever screened in primetime". Despite the negative critical response, it achieved reasonable ratings and was recommissioned for a second series, before being cancelled in 2014.

Concern was shown for Daley's role in the show by the head of British Swimming David Sparkes, who claimed that Daley was in danger of putting his media work before his sporting career, and possibly hampering his chances of a gold medal at the 2016 Rio Olympic Games. Andy Banks, Daley's coach at Plymouth Diving and British Swimming and judge on the show, disagreed with Sparkes' criticism, stating his concerns that such negative comments might take the fun out of diving for Daley and indeed drive him away from the sport altogether to pursue his media career. Daley eventually won a bronze medal in the men's synchronized platform dive in the 2016 Games.

Heat 3 contestant Tina Malone made negative comments in an interview with Liverpool radio station Juice FM several days before her appearance on the show. She called Splash! and other reality shows "garbage", as well as stating that "it's the big fat cheques that make me happy", in reference to the fact she appears in such TV shows only for the financial reward.

== International versions ==
An American version, under the title Splash, premiered on 19 March 2013, from the Riverside Aquatics Complex at Riverside City College and Pasadena's Rose Bowl Aquatics Center on ABC television. The American version features 2012 Olympic 10m diving champion David Boudia and American diving legend Greg Louganis as judges. The Seven Network in Australia also commissioned Celebrity Splash! which aired in 2013. In 2015, a Lithuanian version of the show, called Šuolis, premiered on TV3.
