= Toonattik =

Television series

- Network: CITV (GMTV)
- Launched: 5 February 2005; 21 years ago
- Closed: 26 December 2010; 15 years ago
- Country of origin: United Kingdom
- Owner: GMTV
- Key people: Jamie Rickers; Anna Williamson; Nigel Clarke; David Oliver; Anna Kumble; Laura Hamilton
- Headquarters: London, England, United Kingdom
- Major broadcasting contracts: Disney, Nickelodeon and Cartoon Network
- Format: Children's programming
- Running time: 120 minutes (includes adverts)
- Original language: English
- Action Stations! (2006–2010); The Fluffy Club (2008–2010)

Toonattik was the flagship children's strand of the British breakfast television station, GMTV (known on-air as CITV at weekends), which ran from 5 February 2005 to 26 December 2010. The strand aired on weekend mornings from 07:25 (sometimes at 07:20) until GMTV's closedown at 09:25, featuring a selection of both British and imported cartoons, mainly from brands such as Disney, Nickelodeon and Cartoon Network. It was presented by Jamie Rickers and Anna Williamson before being out-vision from 15 May to 26 December 2010.

== History ==
Toonattik launched on 5 February 2005 as the new children's weekend morning slot on GMTV, featuring a mix of imported cartoons for ages 4–12. The slot was originally split into two, with the first half featuring pre-school programming with out-of-vision continuity, and the second half featuring shows for older children, which featured in-vision continuity links provided by Jamie Rickers and Anna Williamson. Initially the show relied heavily on phone-in competitions. After a few months on-air the slot was split into two, each adopting their own individual branding to separate the age categories. The pre-school slot for ages 0–6 became known as Wakey! Wakey! (later replaced by The Fluffy Club in 2008), with the 7-12 slot using the Toonattik name. The relaunch focused more on audience participation, with the presenters showcasing drawings and letters sent in by the viewers.

Four months later, when Toonattik was revamped, each week Rickers and Williamson would lead teams of boys and girls in a battle of the sexes, playing various games to earn as much points as they could, a format later adopted by Holly and Stephen's Saturday Showdown in 2006. Viewers had the chance to send in suggestions for games, these were pulled from a special chest named the "Challenge Chest". Then the final game would be randomly chosen by the "Golden Wheel of Twizzle", and a spin of the "Toonattik Twizzler" would determine which of the two presenters would be playing that game. At the end of each show the losing team would receive a 'pie in the face' from the winners.

A new Toonattik website was created by 4T2 and launched in late January 2006, allowing viewers to play virtual versions of their favourite "Toonattik Twizzler" games, as well as send emails to Rickers and Williamson, read about their favourite cartoons and unlock bonus content by entering a secret code word revealed at the end of each show.

On 12 March 2006, ITV began simulcasting Toonattik on the CITV Channel, allowing younger Sky Digital, Virgin Media and Freeview viewers to access the show through the children's section of the EPG for the first time. Also, the EPG showed details for the programmes broadcast during the Toonattik time slot, instead of merely saying Toonattik.

A Toonattik board game was produced by Character Options Ltd in 2007.

On 6 March 2010, it was reported that Toonattik presenters Rickers and Williamson would be made redundant, as part of ITV plc's buyout of Disney's 25% share in GMTV (since renamed to ITV Breakfast). They presented Toonattik together for the last time on 9 May 2010, which featured a big song finale at the end. Soon after their departure, Jamie & Anna were hired to work for Nickelodeon. From the following weekend, the slot relaunched with out-of-vision presentation, this remained until its eventual axing at the end of 2010. From 15 May to 26 December 2010, the programme was hosted by the animated characters named the "Toonteam" (Bizzle, Hobson, Cocker3, Donk, Pat, Ni-No, Brian and Poop Dog), in place of Rickers and Williamson. On 18 January 2014, children's in-vision presentation during the ITV Breakfast slot at weekends returned in the form of Scrambled!.

== Action Stations! ==
Action Stations! was the flagship children's strand of the British breakfast television station, GMTV2 (branded as part of CITV). The slot aired between 06:00 and 08:40 on the CITV channel.

It began broadcasting on 13 March 2006 and was simulcast on both the CITV channel and ITV2; however, it moved to ITV4 on 17 March 2008, meaning that ITV2 could broadcast 24 hours a day. From June 7, 2010, ITV4 ceased simulcasting, meaning that from early June 2010, GMTV2 could only be seen on the CITV channel, again allowing ITV4 to broadcast 24 hours a day.

Originally, Action Stations featured the voices of Toonattik presenters Jamie Rickers and Anna Williamson in the form of robots with pre-recorded links in between cartoons, and was later voiced by Mike Rance as a spaceship captain. Between September 2009 and May 2010, the slot had the presenters presenting links from the Action Station's 'space base'.

== See also ==
- List of GMTV programmes
