= Sally Morgan (psychic) =

British self-proclaimed psychic medium (born 1951)

- Born: Sally Mary West; 20 September 1951 (age 75); Fulham, London, England
- Other name: Psychic Sally
- Occupations: Television personality, medium, author
- Website: http://www.sallymorgan.tv

Sally Morgan (born Sally Mary West; 20 September 1951), also known by her stage name Psychic Sally, is a British television and stage artist, author and controversially, a self-proclaimed psychic medium.

== Career ==
Morgan claims to have had her first psychic experience at the age of nine months and has said she saw her first spirit when she was aged four. In her early 20s, Sally would do 'readings' for her friends at parties as party-tricks. She lived with her supposed ability for nearly 25 years, before leaving her career as a dental nurse to become a professional medium.

She has appeared in various television shows, starting with the ITV2 programme Sally Morgan: Star Psychic in 2007, which showcased her attempts to seemingly connect audiences with the spirits and ghosts of their loved ones. Subsequent programmes included the Sky Bio channel programmes The Psychic Life of Sally Morgan and Psychic Sally: On the Road, together with Sky Living's Psychic Sally's Big Fat Operation. Following the notoriety of her first television show, Morgan embarked upon the first of numerous, nationwide theatre tours.

In September 2011, during a show in Dublin, Ireland, an audience member had claimed that she overheard a man relaying information to Morgan from the control room at the rear of the theatre. The woman later called in to the Irish, National, radio network RTÉ to report the situation. On her website, Morgan responded to The Guardian's report by denying the involvement of all Grand Canal Theatre employees and stating that her head microphone was a one-way device. Morgan also went on to sue the Daily Mail for libel due to an article they published, that in her words "Was completely false and defamatory". The Daily Mail later published an apology and paid £125,000 in libel damages after accepting that the earpiece claim was "untrue". At around this time, The Merseyside Skeptics Society and science writer Simon Singh requested a "test" of Morgan's psychic abilities. However, Morgan declined to participate.

At a public show on 23 February 2012 Morgan gave a reading to two members of the audience, Drew McAdam and his wife Elizabeth. The reading described a man called Toby who had died in an explosion. However, prior to the show, Drew and his wife say they fed Morgan this information by emailing her website and leaving notes in a box provided in the foyer for so-called "love-letters". McAdam's description of the death of "Toby" was taken from a fictional character who died in an explosion in the 1970s BBC drama, Doomwatch.

Morgan performed a psychic reading for Big Brother winner Brian Dowling on ITV2 in 2007. Asked on camera whether she knew him, she said "well, I know of him". She had actually given a similar reading for him in 2005. She later claimed that her original response was made "because the director told me to".

In March 2014, Morgan became embarrassed during a performance after contacting the spirit of a woman who was still alive in the audience. The woman had mistakenly given Morgan a photo of herself instead of a photo of a dead loved one. Morgan then proceeded to contact and communicate with the spirit of the woman, and when the truth became known, the audience erupted in laughter and Morgan was unable to recover the performance.

On 16 August 2018, Morgan entered the Celebrity Big Brother House, where she finished in 5th place.

In mid-2021, Morgan took a brief hiatus after losing her husband of 46 years, John Morgan (aged 74), to Coronavirus. Morgan stated: "The support I have been receiving both online and, on the road, has kept me buoyant and allowed me to keep going in such a tough time."

== Criticism ==
Morgan has been criticised on multiple occasions for claiming she has psychic abilities, and has been accused of being a fraud.

Members of the public called a radio station claiming to have heard Morgan appearing to repeat back information that they said moments earlier they had overheard coming from the theatre lighting box during one of Morgan's shows at The Grand Canal Theatre in Dublin. Citing "substantial damage to her reputation, as well as hurt, distress and embarrassment", Morgan sued Associated Newspapers for £150,000 over magician Paul Zenon's 22 September 2011 article in the Daily Mail about these public claims. JREF President, D.J. Grothe, writing for The Huffington Post questioned why Morgan would sue for £150,000 when she could prove her ability by winning JREF's "Million Dollar Paranormal Challenge". "It makes one wonder if even Sally Morgan believes that Sally Morgan's powers are real."

== Legal issues ==
In October 2014, Morgan had used legal threats, while her husband and son-in-law had used homophobic slurs and verbal intimidation, in a confrontation with sceptical activist Mark Tilbrook. Tilbrook had been in the vicinity of many stage psychic shows handing out leaflets entitled "Look After Yourself", advising audience members of clues that might distinguish between a person with genuine supernatural powers and someone who "just appears to have them". Morgan fired her husband and son-in-law from her management team a week later, after video footage of the incident emerged.

In summer 2018, Sally Morgan Enterprises went into voluntary liquidation following an £2.9m Accelerated Payment Notice claim by HMRC.

== Bibliography ==
- Medium at Large CICO Books (2006) ISBN 978-1904991366
- My Psychic Life Penguin (2009) ISBN 978-0141038490
- Healing Spirits: How the Other Side can help your grieving heart Penguin (2009) ISBN 978-0141043548
- Life After Death: Messages of Love from the Other Side Penguin (2011) ASIN B004S25O66
- Call me Psychic Sally Morgan Entertainments (2015) ISBN 978-0992700195
