= The Brain Drain =

- Genre: Comedy Panel show
- Created by: Dan Patterson; Mark Leveson
- Presented by: Jimmy Mulville
- Starring: Tony Hawks; Jo Brand
- Country of origin: United Kingdom
- Original language: English
- No. of series: 2
- No. of episodes: 14

Production
- Running time: 30 minutes
- Production company: Hat Trick Productions

Original release
- Network: BBC2
- Release: 19 September 1992 – 13 August 1993

The Brain Drain is a British comedy panel show that aired on BBC2 from 19 September 1992 to 13 August 1993. It was hosted by Jimmy Mulville.

== Format ==
The show was essentially a comedy version of Question Time. It featured four celebrity panellists (including regular panellists Tony Hawks and (in the 2nd series) Jo Brand) who were asked questions by members of the studio audience (including occasional celebrity guests) to which they were invited to give a humorous response.

== Transmissions ==
Series	Episodes	Originally released	
Series	Episodes	First released	Last released
1	6	19 September 1992	24 October 1992
2	8	25 June 1993	13 August 1993
