= Prove It! =

2005 British children's TV series

- Created by: GeronimoTV Limited
- Presented by: Joe Challands, Jamie Rickers, Fred Talbot, Joe Tracini
- No. of series: 2
- No. of episodes: 26

Production
- Running time: 20 minutes
- Production companies: GeronimoTV, STV Studios

Original release
- Network: ITV (CITV)
- Release: 5 January 2005 – 3 June 2007

Prove It! was a British educational children's TV series presented by Joe Challands and Jamie Rickers. It was an entertainment programme focusing on the illustration of scientific facts, while raising the question (only sometimes answered in the affirmative) of whether a certain claim can be empirically verified. The programme was usually on the CITV Channel until August 2012. Regular segments include the 60 Second Prove It!, where a presenter attempts to perform a task in 60 seconds to prove it is possible, Fred's Shed where Fred Talbot shows how to use simple home items to perform various fun and interesting experiments and U Prove It, where viewers demonstrate their unusual skills.

Prove It! was an original format by GeronimoTV and was co-produced with STV Studios (then known as "SMG Productions").
