= Jo Brand Through the Cakehole =

- Written by: Jo Brand; Jeff Green; Jim Miller
- Presented by: Jo Brand
- Country of origin: United Kingdom
- Original language: English
- No. of series: 2
- No. of episodes: 14

Production
- Running time: 35 minutes 45 minutes (special)

Original release
- Network: Channel 4
- Release: 30 December 1993 – 16 February 1996

Jo Brand Through the Cakehole is a British stand-up comedy and sketch show produced by Channel X, and starring Jo Brand as the show's host. It debuted on 30 December 1993 in the United Kingdom and was broadcast on Channel 4 for three years, from 1993 to 1996.

== Series overview ==
| Series | Episodes | Originally released | |
| Series | Episodes | First released | Last released |
|---|---|---|---|
| Pilot | | 30 December 1993 | |
| 1 | 6 | 8 April 1994 | 13 May 1994 |
| Christmas Special | | 23 December 1994 | |
| 2 | 6 | 12 January 1996 | 16 February 1996 |
