= Head on Comedy =

- Genre: Comedy
- Directed by: Pati Marr
- Presented by: Jo Brand
- Composer: Peter Baikie
- Country of origin: United Kingdom
- Original language: English
- No. of series: 1
- No. of episodes: 6

Production
- Executive producers: Mike Bolland; William Burdett-Coutts
- Producer: Patricia McGowan
- Production companies: Assembly Film & Television

Original release
- Network: BBC One
- Release: 13 July – 24 August 2000

Head on Comedy was a comedy debate show hosted by Jo Brand in which two teams of three, captained by Bill Bailey and Ed Byrne, would debate trivial topics such as 'This house wants to be a man'. It ran for one series, consisting of six episodes.

== Episodes ==
No.	Guests	Directed by	Original release date
1	Fiona Allen; Patrick Kielty; Lynn Ferguson; Terry Alderton	Pati Marr	13 July 2000
2	Doon Mackichan; Barry Cryer; Arabella Weir; Leslie Phillips	Pati Marr	20 July 2000
3	Rhona Cameron; Felix Dexter; Steve Punt; Omid Djalili	Pati Marr	27 July 2000
4	Rhona Cameron; Greg Proops; Bradley Walsh; Adam Bloom	Pati Marr	10 August 2000
5	Brian Sewell; Patrick Kielty; Fred MacAulay; Felix Dexter	Pati Marr	17 August 2000
6	Hattie Hayridge; David Mellor; Jeff Green; Tony Hawks	Pati Marr	24 August 2000

== Reception ==
The show received mixed reviews. Robert Hanks, writing in The Independent was strongly critical, concluding that it "is less Head On than Television Off". Paul Hoggart from The Times was more positive, acknowledging that it was "frayed round the edges", but that it "had its surreal and surprising moments".
