= Dan Osborne =

British television personality (born 1991)

- Born: Daniel James Osborne; 27 June 1991 (age 35); Dagenham, England
- Occupation: Television personality
- Years active: 2013–2018
- Known for: The Only Way Is Essex; Splash!; Celebrity Big Brother 22
- Spouse: Jacqueline Jossa (m. 2017; sep. 2026)
- Children: 3

Daniel Osborne (born 27 June 1991) is an English television personality, known for being a former cast member on the ITVBe reality series The Only Way Is Essex. In 2018, he was a housemate on Celebrity Big Brother, reaching the final and finishing in third place.

== Personal life ==
Osborne married actress Jacqueline Jossa in 2017, and they have two daughters. He also has a son from an earlier relationship. The couple separated in March 2026.

== Filmography ==
=== Television ===
Year	Title	Role
2013–2015	The Only Way Is Essex	Series regular
2014	Splash!	Contestant; fourth place
2018	Celebrity Big Brother 22	Housemate; third place
2018	Celebrity Road Trip: Lost in Transylvania!	3 episodes

=== Guest appearances ===
- Big Brother's Bit on the Side (September 2018) – 1 Episode
- Most Shocking Celebrity Moments 2018 (December 2018) – TV Documentary
