= The More You Ignore Me (film) =

2018 British comedy drama film

- Theatrical release poster
- Directed by: Keith English
- Written by: Jo Brand
- Produced by: Debbie Gray
- Starring: Sheridan Smith; Ella Hunt; Mark Addy; Sally Phillips; Sheila Hancock; Jo Brand; Tony Way
- Cinematography: Chris Fergusson
- Edited by: Kim Gaster
- Music by: Guy Garvey, Peter Jobson, Paul Saunderson
- Production company: Genesius Pictures
- Distributed by: Entertainment Film Distributors
- Release date: 6 July 2018 (UK)
- Running time: 98 minutes
- Country: United Kingdom
- Language: English
- Box office: $212,500

The More You Ignore Me is a 2018 British comedy drama film directed by Keith English and written by Jo Brand, based on her 2009 novel of the same name. The film stars Sheridan Smith, Ella Hunt, Mark Addy, and Sally Phillips. Set in 1980s rural England, it tells the story of a teenager obsessed with Morrissey and The Smiths, whose life is shaped by her mother's severe mental illness.

== Plot ==
Alice Hollingworth is a bright but lonely teenager living in a small English town during the 1980s. Her life is complicated by her mother Gina's (Sheridan Smith) struggle with severe mental illness, which began as postnatal depression and has since dominated the family's existence. Alice's father, Keith (Mark Addy), is a stoic and caring presence, trying to hold the family together while supporting both his wife and daughter.

Alice finds solace in music, particularly in her growing obsession with Morrissey and The Smiths, after a revelatory moment watching Top of the Pops. As Alice navigates the challenges of adolescence, her infatuation with Morrissey becomes both an escape from her difficult home life and a way to process her own fears about inheriting her mother's condition.

The film follows the family as they grapple with Gina's unpredictable behaviour, the strain it places on their relationships, and the stigma of mental illness in their tight-knit community. Alongside moments of humour and warmth, the story confronts the realities of living with and loving someone with a serious psychiatric disorder.

== Cast ==
- Sheridan Smith as Gina Hollingworth
- Ella Hunt as Alice Hollingworth
- Mark Addy as Keith Hollingworth
- Sally Phillips as Marie Henty
- Sheila Hancock as Nan Wildgoose
- Tony Way as Wobbly Wildgoose
- Jo Brand as Sandra
- Tom Davis as Bighead Wildgoose
- Elizabeth Carling as Jean
- Ricky Tomlinson as Bert Wildgoose

== Production and release ==
The More You Ignore Me was the feature debut of director Keith English and was produced by Debbie Gray for Genesius Pictures. Jo Brand, drawing on her background as a former psychiatric nurse, adapted her own novel of the same name for the screen to address the impact of mental illness on families. The film was shot on location near Blackpool. The film's title is based on the 1994 Morrissey song "The More You Ignore Me, the Closer I Get".

The film premiered in the United Kingdom on 6 July 2018, and grossed approximately £69,000 in the UK. It was later made available on streaming platforms and DVD, and won Best Comedy at the National Film Awards UK.

== Critical reception ==
The More You Ignore Me received generally positive reviews from critics and audiences. Reviewers praised the film's heartfelt depiction of mental health issues, the strength of the performances—particularly by Sheridan Smith and Ella Hunt—and the script's balance of warmth and seriousness. Some critics noted that while the film was marketed as a comedy, it is better described as a drama with comic elements.

Peter Bradshaw of The Guardian noted the film's "terrific warmth and strength". Robbie Collin in The Daily Telegraph called it "an appealing, bittersweetly funny tale".

== Awards ==
- National Film Awards UK – Best Comedy (2019)
