= Jessica Alves =

Brazilian-British television personality

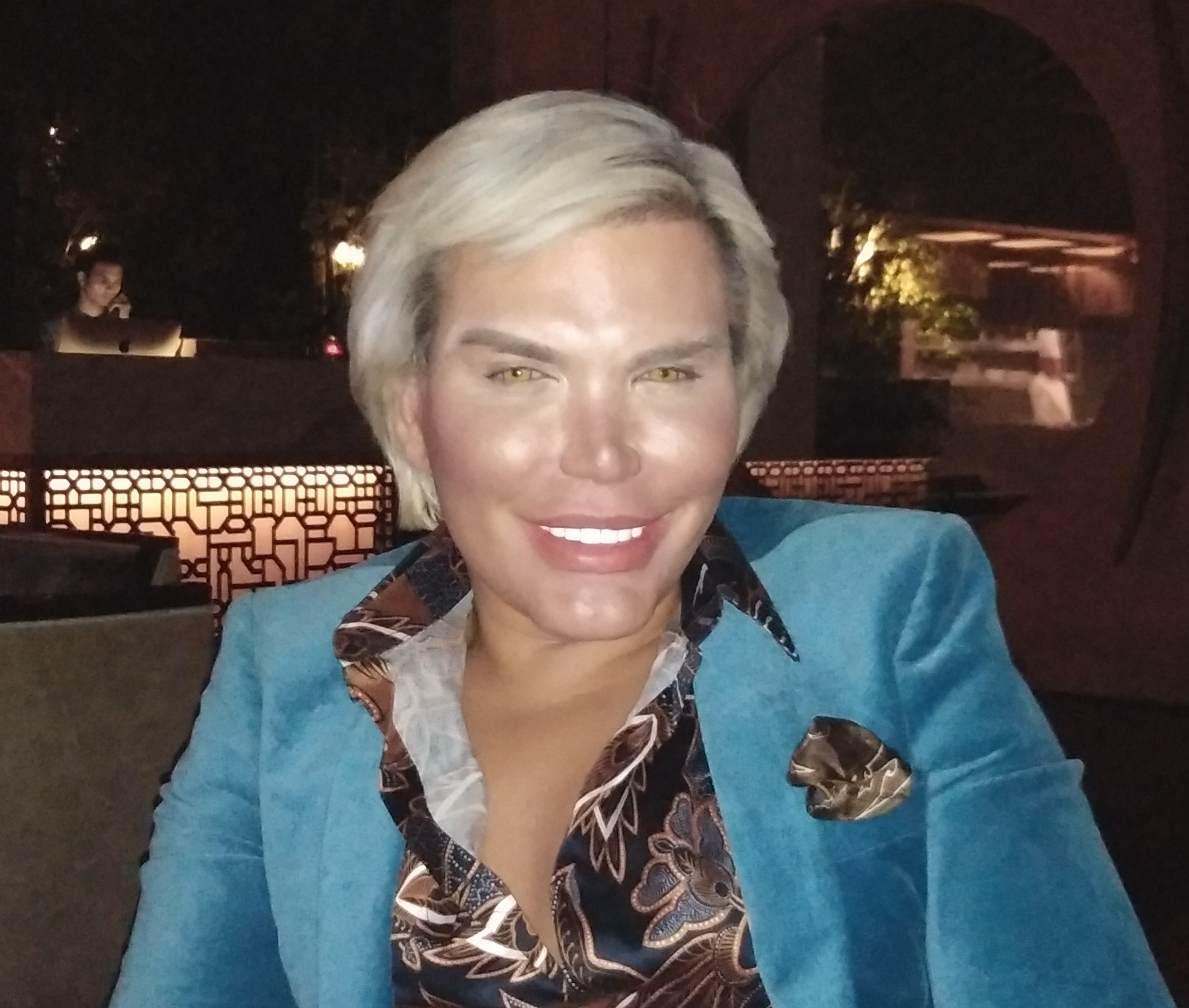
- Alves in 2017
- Born: Rodrigo Alves; 30 July 1983 (age 43); São Paulo, Brazil
- Other names: Rodrigo Alves; Roddy Alves; Jezz
- Citizenship: British
- Education: London College of Communication
- Occupations: TV celebrity, flight attendant
- Known for: Extensive plastic surgeries

Jessica Alves (formerly Rodrigo Alves; born 30 July 1983) is a Brazilian-British television personality noted for having undergone dozens of plastic surgeries to alter her appearance. Prior to her 2020 transition, she was often referred to as a human Ken doll. She has since been referred to as the human Barbie doll.

== Early life and education ==
Alves was born Rodrigo Alves on 30 July 1983 in São Paulo, Brazil, to a Brazilian mother and a British father. Her father, Roserval Alves, hailed from a Portuguese family who arrived in Brazil in the 1940s. Initially the family was in the farming trade but expanded their business involvement to include supermarkets, shopping centres and real estate. When she was young, her grandfather bought her Barbie dolls. Although Alves was assigned male at birth, from “the age of three, four, five, six” she considered herself to be female, played with dolls and cross-dressed. She believes people should not be defined by gender. She was shy, and bullied throughout childhood. As a teen, Alves had a hormone difference, with atypical estrogen amounts for her assigned sex, causing breast tissue to grow; her other features were also picked on by the bullies. Her family has a string of grocery stores in Brazil which has made them wealthy, but as of 2018, Alves has not made any profit relating to the stores.

Alves moved to London at age 18, where she studied public relations at London College of Communication. She has money from an inheritance from her maternal grandparents.

== Biography ==
Alves has had several episodes of surgery, including nose jobs which resulted in the loss of her sense of smell. Soon after that experience she underwent surgery in Brazil to inject a gel into her arms to make them look more muscular. She lost use of both arms for a while, and the experience led her to seek psychotherapy. In 2013, Alves was diagnosed with body dysmorphic disorder; a “mental health condition where a person spends an obsessive amount of time worrying about flaws in their appearance”.

Alves appeared on the American reality series Botched in 2017 (season 4, episode 4), where cosmetic surgeons attempt to improve unsuccessful cosmetic surgeries. Paul Nassif refused to undertake additional rhinoplasty on Alves, noting the nasal passages were blocked with scarring, nasal tissue had not recovered from previous surgeries, and Alves was at risk of substantial necrosis.

As of 2018, Alves had homes in London and Marbella, Spain, and was a regular presenter on television. She has a sizeable monthly pension from inheritance from her grandparents, and rents properties in Puerto Banús in Spain to tourists. Her net worth in 2018 was estimated at over £30 million. In 2018, Alves travelled between London and Brazil for work and found that being widely recognised, and being asked for selfies, had its downside, and felt a new freedom when cross-dressing as Jessica. The idea of transitioning gender identity, outwardly, to permanently being female was put on hold, in part because of objections from her father.

As of August 2022, Alvez has spent a self-estimated £1,000,000 undergoing 90 cosmetic procedures, including injections, at least 51 of which were plastic surgeries. Alves has undergone liposuction, had gel filler injected into shoulders, biceps, and triceps, applies minoxidil topically, has had hair implants and a number of facelifts, wears tinted contact lenses, and has had twelve rhinoplasties. Her first plastic surgery was at the age of 17 to remove gynecomastia. Her first nose job was when she was 19, As of March 2020, she has spent an estimated £650,000 on 60 operations to emulate a Barbie doll. Alves recounted that pre-transition she tried to compensate for her lack of masculine tendencies by trying to look more so through the surgeries: "I'd always felt feminine and when I struggled to be manly with my personality, I decided to make my appearance as masculine as possible instead, ... But no matter how much I looked like Ken nothing eased the pain of being Barbie inside."

In August 2018, Alves appeared on the UK television show Celebrity Big Brother as a celebrity housemate. After using the n-word in a conversation about the type of sexual partner she preferred, Alves was given a final warning by producers that if she repeated the offensive language she would be evicted from the house. The incident garnered over 1,000 complaints to regulator Ofcom. After an unspecified "incident", Alves was expelled from the show in the early hours of the morning on the tenth day.

In March 2019, Alves released a song with Italian plastic surgeon Giacomo Urtis called "Plastic World".

In January 2020, Alves came out as transgender after three months of living in privacy. She shared that she had always been depressed and felt that, as risky as more surgeries were, she needed to transition or she would die. She underwent breast augmentation, vaginoplasty, and feminization laryngoplasty. During the early COVID-19 pandemic, she was separated from her family but reunited with them in June. In July 2020, Alves announced that she had changed her name to Jessica. In August 2020, her father died. He had long been worried about Jessica dying from a surgery; they remained close nevertheless.

In 2024, Jessica expressed that she desires a sapiosexual relationship.

== Filmography ==
=== Television ===
Year	Title	Role	Notes	Ref.
2022	Dating Different	Self	S2.E37 Jessica Alves: This is my first Blind Date as a Woman	
2022	Tonight LIVE with Mark Dolan	Self	S2.E113, S2.E136	
2018	Live - Non è la D'Urso	Self	S1.E8, S2.E15 Alex e Delia (2020)	
2018	Domenica Live	Self	13 May 2018, 7 October 2018	
2018	Arman ja viimeinen ristiretki	Self	S3.E1 Ihmis-Ken - oma keho	
2018	Celebrity Big Brother	Participant	Season 22	
2018	The Noite com Danilo Gentili	Self	S5.E53 Rodrigo Alvez	
2017	Loose Women	Self	S22.E14	
2017	Botched (TV series)	Self	S4.E4 To Implant or Not to Implant	
2017	Hooked on the Look	Self	S2.E8 Pixee Fox and Rodrigo Alves' Plastic Surgery Camp, S2.E23 Human Ken Doll's spiritual mission to Delhi, S3.E6 Rodrigo Alves has four Ribs Removed (2018), S3.E27 Bottoms Up! (2018), S5.E1 Meet the Human Dolls Obsessed with Surgery (2020), S5.E9 Rodrigo Alves: Why I'm Becoming a Woman (2023), S6.E6 Ken Doll to Barbie: How will my Friend React? (2021), S6.E24 My £200k Transition is Complete - But will I get the All-Clear? (2021), S6.E32 $1M human Ken Doll reunites with Jessica Alves after Transition (2021), S6.E49 Jessica Alves reveals her new Bikini Body (2021), S6.E81 Jessica Alves finds new 'Life-Changing' Treatment (2021), S8.E11 I'm Ready for a Baby (2023)	
2017	Sálvame Deluxe	Self	El nuevo Sábado Deluxe	
2016	This Morning (TV programme)	Self	16 May 2016, 3 February 2017, S31.E26, 13 July 2020, S32.E4 (2020)	
2015	Reggie Yates' Extreme UK	Self	S1.E3 Dying for a Six Pack	
