= Jo Brand =

English entertainer (born 1957)

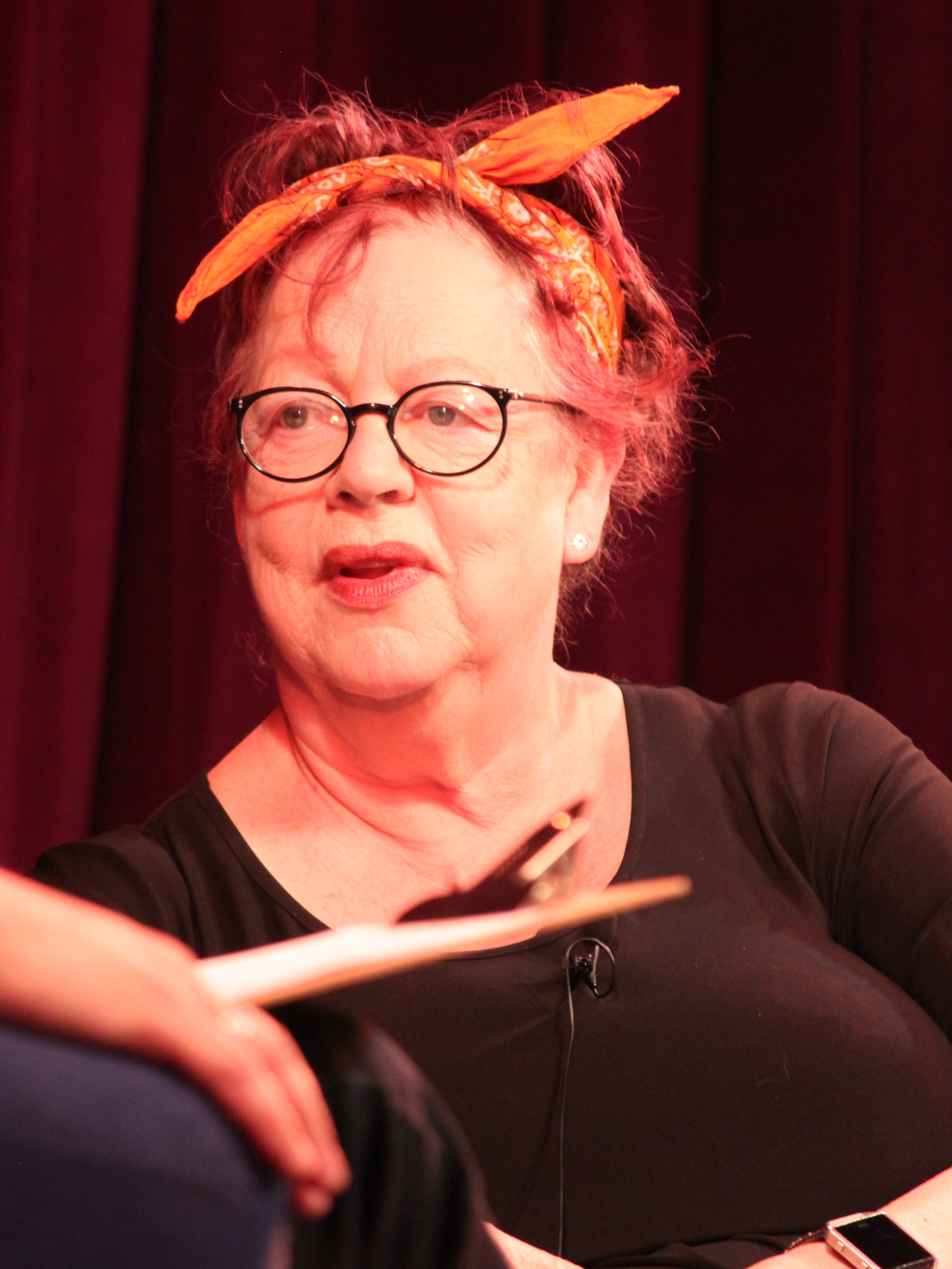
- Brand in 2019
- Born: Josephine Grace Brand; 23 July 1957 (age 69); Clapham, London, England
- Education: Brunel University (BA)
- Spouse: Bernie Bourke (m. 1997)
- Children: 2, including Maisi

Comedy career
- Years active: 1986–present
- Medium: Stand-up; television; film
- Genres: Observational comedy; alternative
- Subjects: Marriage; politics

Josephine Grace Brand (born 23 July 1957) is an English comedian, presenter, actress and writer. Starting her entertainment career with a move from psychiatric nursing to the alternative comedy stand-up scene and early performances on Saturday Live, she went on to appear on The Brain Drain, Channel 4's Jo Brand Through the Cakehole, Getting On and various television appearances including as a regular guest on QI, Have I Got News for You and Would I Lie to You?. She also makes regular appearances on BBC Radio 4 in programmes such as The News Quiz and Just a Minute. From 2014 to 2025 she was the presenter of The Great British Bake Off: An Extra Slice. In 2003, Brand was listed in The Observer as one of the 50 funniest acts in British comedy.

== Early life ==
Brand was born in Clapham, London, near St Paul's Church in a house which was "a little terraced Victorian place on the Wandsworth Road with an outside toilet", and grew up in Hastings, East Sussex. Her mother was a social worker at Charing Cross Hospital and her father was a structural engineer. Her father suffered from depression and her parents separated when Brand was a teenager. Brand is the middle of three children, with two brothers. When she was about four, the family moved to the village of St Mary's Platt near Sevenoaks in Kent, and a year later, to Benenden. Brand was educated at St Mary's Platt Primary School, Benenden Village Primary School, Tunbridge Wells Girls' Grammar School until the age of 16, Hastings High School for Girls and Bexhill College.

== Career ==
=== Early ===
After working in a pub, for Barnardo's, and as a nursing assistant in a residential unit for adults with learning disabilities, Brand took a joint social science degree with a Registered Mental Nurse qualification at Brunel University. She then worked as a psychiatric nurse for ten years, at the South London Bethlem hospital, Cefn Coed Hospital in Swansea and Maudsley Hospital in south London.

=== Comedy ===
When Brand began her career in comedy, she used the stage name the "Sea Monster". She was part of the British alternative comedy movement, working in London alternative comedy clubs in the mid-1980s, and appearing initially on the Saturday Live television show. She shared a flat with fellow comic and comedy club owner Ivor Dembina.

Brand's early style involved her delivering jokes in a bored monotone, one line at a time, with pauses in between. It drew heavily from pop culture and the media, with many jokes containing references to celebrities and public figures. Brand has said that she drank heavily before her first gig, was heckled throughout, and received no applause at the end of the set. Her Doc Marten boots, large size and short hair led to false rumours that she was a lesbian.

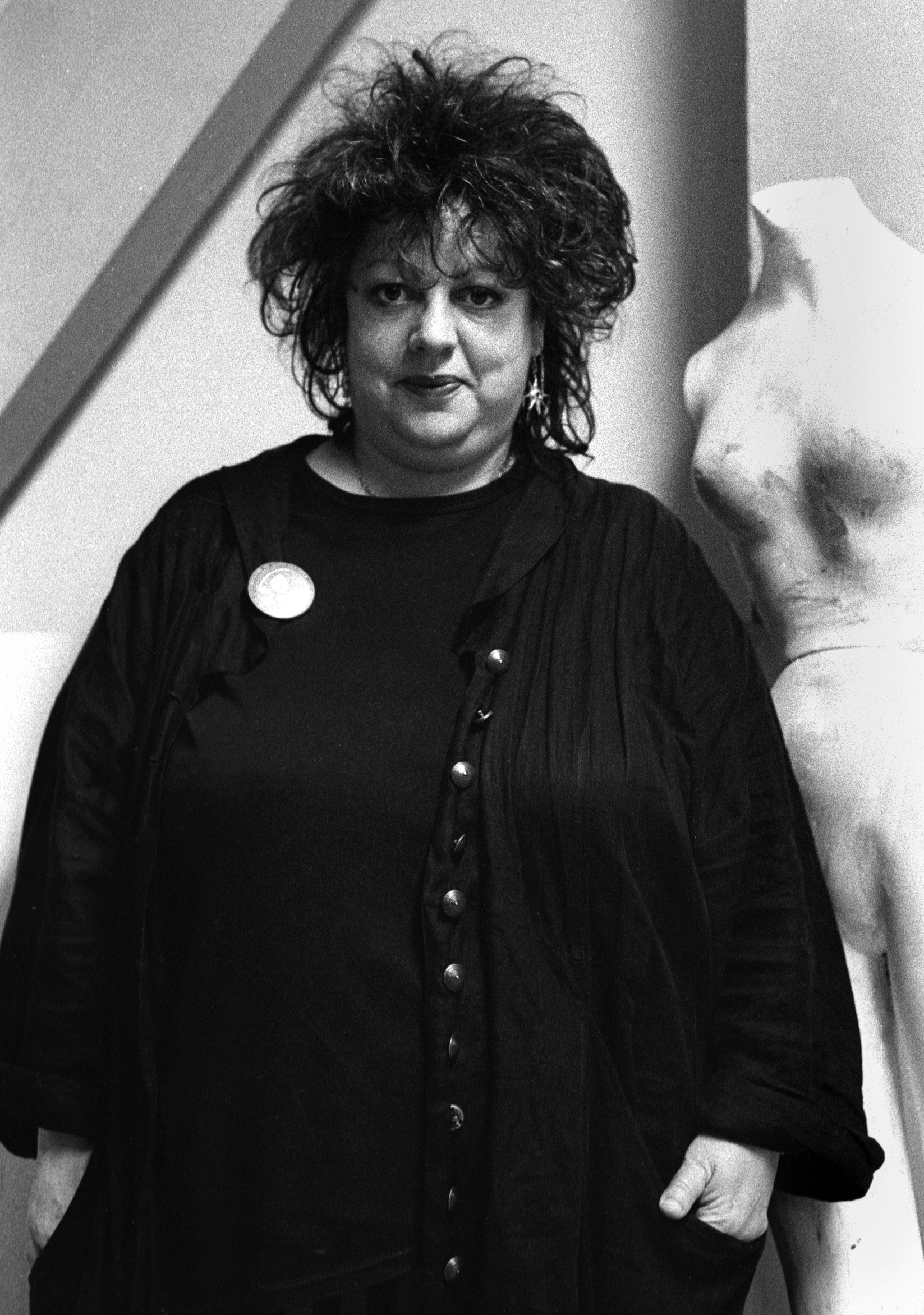
Jo Brand in 1994 in Belfast

In 2007, Brand narrated Laughter & Tears: The Les Dawson Story, a documentary tribute to Les Dawson, which was broadcast on BBC Radio 2 in October 2007.

In 2010, Brand took part in Channel 4's Comedy Gala, a benefit show held in aid of Great Ormond Street Children's Hospital, filmed live at the O2 Arena in London on 30 March.

Brand played the Demon Dinner Lady in the British live-action film Horrid Henry: The Movie (2011). She also provided a voice-over for the Lyric, Hammersmith Theatre's 2011 pantomime Aladdin.

In August 2015, Brand judged the first ever Class Clowns competition at the Edinburgh Festival Fringe, she also announced the winner at the Gilded Balloon on the night.

Brand wrote a feature-film adaptation of her novel The More You Ignore Me. The film was released in 2018.

=== Television ===
In 1993, Brand became a resident panellist, along with Tony Hawks, on BBC monologue show The Brain Drain. Her transition into mainstream television continued when she starred in her own series on Channel 4, Jo Brand Through the Cakehole, co-written with comedy writer Jim Miller, who was already her main stand-up writer. Brand has had several solo television series, and presented shows such as Jo Brand's Commercial Breakdown. She had a cameo appearance in an episode of Absolutely Fabulous entitled "New Best Friend" (1994), and also appeared on Star Spell, a spin-off from Hard Spell in 2004.

Her television success continued with guest appearances on shows such as Have I Got News for You and QI, to the extent where she became the most frequently appearing guest on the latter, appearing in a total of 34 episodes. As a fan of Countdown, Brand achieved an ambition when she was invited to appear in the show's "Dictionary Corner" as the celebrity guest. She later became a friend of the host, Richard Whiteley, and after his death in 2005 attended his memorial service at York Minster. She has appeared on Countdown as a Dictionary Corner guest 88 times.

In 2004, Brand appeared in a special episode of What Not to Wear, where fashion gurus Trinny Woodall and Susannah Constantine gave her a makeover.

On 25 March 2007, Brand appeared on Play It Again, where she was required to learn how to play the organ in just four months. This was in preparation to perform Johann Sebastian Bach's Toccata and Fugue in D Minor for an audience of 8,000 people at London's Royal Albert Hall on the second largest pipe organ in the United Kingdom. In order to practise her performance, she played "Dear Lord and Father of Mankind", a favourite hymn of hers at a church service in her former village church in Benenden, Kent, and accompanied dancers at Blackpool Tower. Prior to this, her only experiences with musical instruments had been childhood piano and violin lessons.

Brand took part in the first celebrity version of Comic Relief Does Fame Academy. In 2007 she appeared as a celebrity contestant on Comic Relief Does The Apprentice. In 2009 she participated in Let's Dance for Comic Relief, another Comic Relief fundraiser, dancing as Britney Spears, reaching the final. She has also been a judge on the show. In January 2013 Brand took part in a special Comic Relief series of The Great British Bake Off.

In April 2009, Brand was as a judge with John Amaechi and Jeremy Stockwell on the BBC Two series The Speaker, charting the search for "Britain's Best Young Speaker".

Brand has been a fill-in host on The Paul O'Grady Show and The One Show. Brand co-created, co-wrote and co-starred in the BBC Four sitcom Getting On opposite Joanna Scanlan and Vicki Pepperdine, for which she won the 2011 Best TV Comedy Actress BAFTA award. The series, directed by Peter Capaldi and Susan Tully, is a gritty and realistic satire on the current state of the NHS, set in a geriatric ward.

In 2011, Brand presented Jo Brand's Big Splash, a television programme where she performed a stand-up routine and visited people with a love of water and it was produced by her production company, What Larks! Productions.

In January 2013 and 2014, Brand was a judge, with Andy Banks and Leon Taylor, on the ITV show Splash! .

On 14 January 2014, Brand presented an episode of The Great Sport Relief Bake Off on BBC Two, a charity version of The Great British Bake Off. In February 2015 she also presented an episode of The Great Comic Relief Bake Off.

Brand is the presenter of The Great British Bake Off: An Extra Slice, which premiered on 8 August 2014. A second series aired from August 2015, third from August 2016 and a fourth from August 2017.

In 2014, Brand co-wrote and starred as Rose in a comedy pilot for Sky Arts called Damned. The show was commissioned for a full series by Channel 4, airing in 2016; its second series aired in 2018.

Since 2017, she has presented the Channel 5 series Jo Brand's Cats & Kittens. The show is available in the United States on Netflix as Kitten Rescuers.

On 28 January 2019, the BBC television series Imagine, presented by Alan Yentob, documented Jo's life and career, with contributions from many of her comedy peers, in a programme titled Jo Brand: No Holds Barred.

In 2019, Brand became a contestant on Taskmaster.

Brand appeared in BBC's Antique Roadshow: Nursing Special (which aired on Sunday 26 February 2023) talking to Fiona Bruce about her time as a psychiatric nurse. Brand spoke about her experience working in emergency mental health clinics, as well as lighter moments performing in hospital pantos.

== Personal life ==
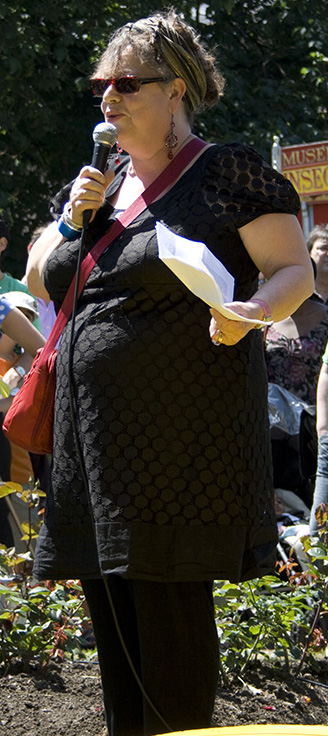
Brand at Bonkers Fest 2007

Brand married Bernie Bourke, a psychiatric nurse, in December 1997 in Shropshire. They live in Dulwich, London, and have two daughters, including Maisie Bourke. Her husband and daughters are vegetarian, but Brand prefers to "pursue pork pies in service stations when no-one is looking".

Brand delivered a guest lecture on the subject of psychiatric nursing for the University of Derby Psychology Society in 1997 in return for a donation to Derby Rape Crisis. Also in 1997, she opened at Lambeth Hospital in South London, the first major exhibition of the Adamson Collection since the death of Edward Adamson, the pioneer of Art Therapy, in 1996.

In February 2009, Brand was among a group of British entertainers who wrote an open letter to The Times of London in support of the leaders of the Baháʼí Faith who were then on trial in Iran.

=== Charity ===
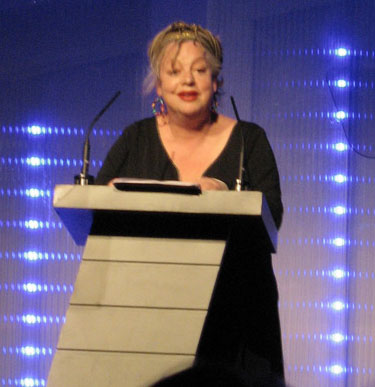
Brand at the BBC Magazines Awards for Excellence, 2007

Brand is a supporter of the charity ActionAid and has taken part in fundraising events for the organisation.

In November 2014, Brand was a part of Gareth Malone's All Star Choir, who released a cover version of "Wake Me Up" to raise money for the BBC's Children in Need.

On 28 January 2016, Brand completed a 150-mile walk across Britain, in aid of Sport Relief, in Liverpool. Brand crossed the finish line at the Albert Dock at 7.30pm, having set off from the banks of the River Humber on 22 January. Her efforts were shown in a 60-minute documentary, which aired on 17 March 2016, called Jo Brand's Hell of a Walk for Sport Relief.

Brand is a patron of the National Self Harm Network (NSHN), International Animal Rescue, and the Prader-Willi Syndrome Association, the London Nightline, as well as Creative Communities South East C.I.O. https://creative-communities.org.uk/. She is the president of the Ectopic Pregnancy Trust.

Brand is an ambassador for the Alzheimer's Society.

=== Political views ===
Brand is a supporter of the Labour Party. As of 2012 she was still a contributor to and supporter of the party.

Brand introduced and spoke at the celebration of Michael Foot's life at London's Lyric Theatre, Shaftesbury Avenue, on 8 November 2010. She is also a republican. In January 2012, she gave the South Shields annual lecture at Harton Technology College alongside the Member of Parliament (MP) for the town, David Miliband.

In August 2014, Brand was one of 200 public figures who were signatories to a letter to The Guardian opposing Scottish independence in the run-up to September's referendum on that issue.

Brand was a supporter of the Women's Equality Party prior to its dissolution in 2024.

In June 2019, Brand was featured in the BBC Radio 4 comedy show Heresy, after a number of right-wing and far-right European election candidates had been doused with milkshakes during campaign walkabouts the previous month. Brand said, "Why bother with a milkshake when you could get some battery acid?" The BBC later defended Brand, explaining "the jokes made on Heresy are deliberately provocative as the title implies" and that they were "not intended to be taken seriously". The Prime Minister at the time, Theresa May, queried whether a joke about throwing battery acid was "appropriate content" for a BBC broadcast and the BBC later announced that the remark would be edited out of any future broadcasts. The Metropolitan Police confirmed that it had "received an allegation of incitement to violence that was reported to the MPS on 13 June" and that they were investigating the matter. Appearing at an event in Henley, Oxfordshire, on the same day, the comedian was said to have apologised for making the joke, saying, "Looking back it probably was somewhat a crass and ill-judged joke that might upset people." It was understood that the allegation reported to the police was not made by Nigel Farage or the Brexit Party. Ofcom said it has received 65 complaints about the episode of Heresy. The police dropped the investigation two days later. On 29 August 2019, the BBC's Executive Complaints Unit (ECU) partially upheld complaints about the joke, saying: "Whilst the ECU recognised that the wider message from this episode is an argument for more civility in political discourse, not less, and Ms Brand's contribution is not intended to be taken as [sic] face value, the ECU felt that it went beyond what was appropriate for the show."

In a 2018 interview, Brand recalled an incident where she was forcibly kissed by a financial trader during a charity event in Canary Wharf, commenting that she chose not to report the incident because "it would ruin the day and I was worried no one would believe me".

== Awards and honours ==
On 17 July 2007 Brand was awarded an honorary doctorate for her work as a psychiatric nurse from the University of Glamorgan (now the University of South Wales). Professor Donna Mead, Dean of the School of Health, Sport and Science, who read Brand up for the award, commented, "Jo incorporates much of her experience working in the field of mental health into her current work as a comedian. This has increased awareness of the work done by nurses in the mental health field. She has also used her experiences of working with individuals with conditions such as Alzheimer's to promote awareness of and raise funds for the Alzheimer's Society." In October 2009 she was awarded an honorary degree from the University of Suffolk. In January 2014 Brand was awarded a second honorary doctorate from Canterbury Christ Church University, for her work in raising awareness of mental health issues and challenging the stigma surrounding such illnesses.

In December 2007 she received a Journal of Psychiatric and Mental Health Nursing Lifetime Achievement Award, an award associated with the Eileen Skellern Memorial Lecture. At this event she was praised for making mental health nursing more visible to the general public.

== Bibliography ==
=== Novels ===
- Mental (with Helen Griffin. HTV Sherman Plays series. Cardiff: Drama Association of Wales, 1996). ISBN 1-898740-41-0
- Sorting Out Billy (novel. London: Review, 2004). ISBN 0-7553-2336-X
- It's Different for Girls (novel. London: Headline Review, 2005). ISBN 0-7553-2229-0
- The More You Ignore Me (novel. London: Headline Review, 2009). ISBN 0-7553-2231-2

=== Autobiographies ===
- Look Back in Hunger. The Autobiography (London: Headline Review, 2009). ISBN 0-7553-5525-3
- Can't Stand Up For Sitting Down. The Autobiography – Part 2 (London: Headline Review, 2010). ISBN 978-0-7553-5526-6

=== Non fiction ===
- A Load of Old Balls: Men in History (London: Simon & Schuster, 1994). ISBN 0-671-71385-X
- A Load of Old Ball Crunchers: Women in History (London: Simon & Schuster, 1996). ISBN 0-684-81695-4

== Filmography ==
=== Television ===
Year	Title	Role	Notes
1990	Up Yer News	Herself	2 episodes
1992–present	Have I Got News for You	Regular panellist/guest host	
1993–1996	Jo Brand Through the Cakehole	Presenter	
1994	Absolutely Fabulous	Carmen	1 episode
2000	Head on Comedy	Presenter	6 episodes
2003–present	QI	Regular panellist	37 appearances
2009	The Speaker	Judge	
2009–2012	Getting On	Kim Wilde	Also written by Brand
2009, 2013	The Paul O'Grady Show	Stand-in presenter	2 episodes
2009–present	Would I Lie to You?	Regular panellist	11 appearances (as of series 19)
2010–2017	Let's Sing and Dance	Panellist	
2011	Jo Brand's Big Splash	Presenter	
2011	Show Me the Funny	Guest judge	1 episode
2013–2014	Splash!	Judge	
2014	The One Show	Stand-in presenter	Two episodes
2014–2015	The Great Sport Relief Bake Off	Presenter	
2014–2018	Damned	Rose Denby	Also written by Brand
2014–2025	The Great British Bake Off: An Extra Slice	Presenter	12 series
2016	Jo Brand's Hell of a Walk for Sport Relief	Herself	One-off episode
2016	Going Forward	Kim Wilde	Also written by Brand
2016–2017	Jo Brand's Cats & Kittens	Presenter	
2018	Britain's Best Junior Doctors	Presenter	1 series
2019	Taskmaster	Contestant	Series 9 (10 episodes)
2020	Kitten Rescue with Jo Brand	Presenter	1 series
2022	Christmas Carole	Ghost of Christmas Present	One-off episode
2025	DNA Journey	Herself	One-off episode
2026	Celebrity Sabotage	Herself	1 episode

=== Film ===
Year	Title	Role	Notes
1999	Human Traffic	Reality	
2011	Horrid Henry: The Movie	Greasy Greta/Demon Dinner Lady	
2017	Peppa Pig: My First Cinema Experience	Mrs. Crocodile (voice)	Segment: The Zoo
2018	The More You Ignore Me	Sandra	Also writer
2026	Melt It! The Film of the Iceman	Herself	

== Awards and nominations ==
- British Comedy Award 1992: Top comedy club performer
- British Comedy Award 1995: Best stand-up comic
- British Comedy Award 2010: Best female TV comic
- BAFTA 2011: Best Female Performance in a Comedy Role
- British Comedy Award 2012: Best female TV comic
