= Leon Taylor =

British diver (born 1977)

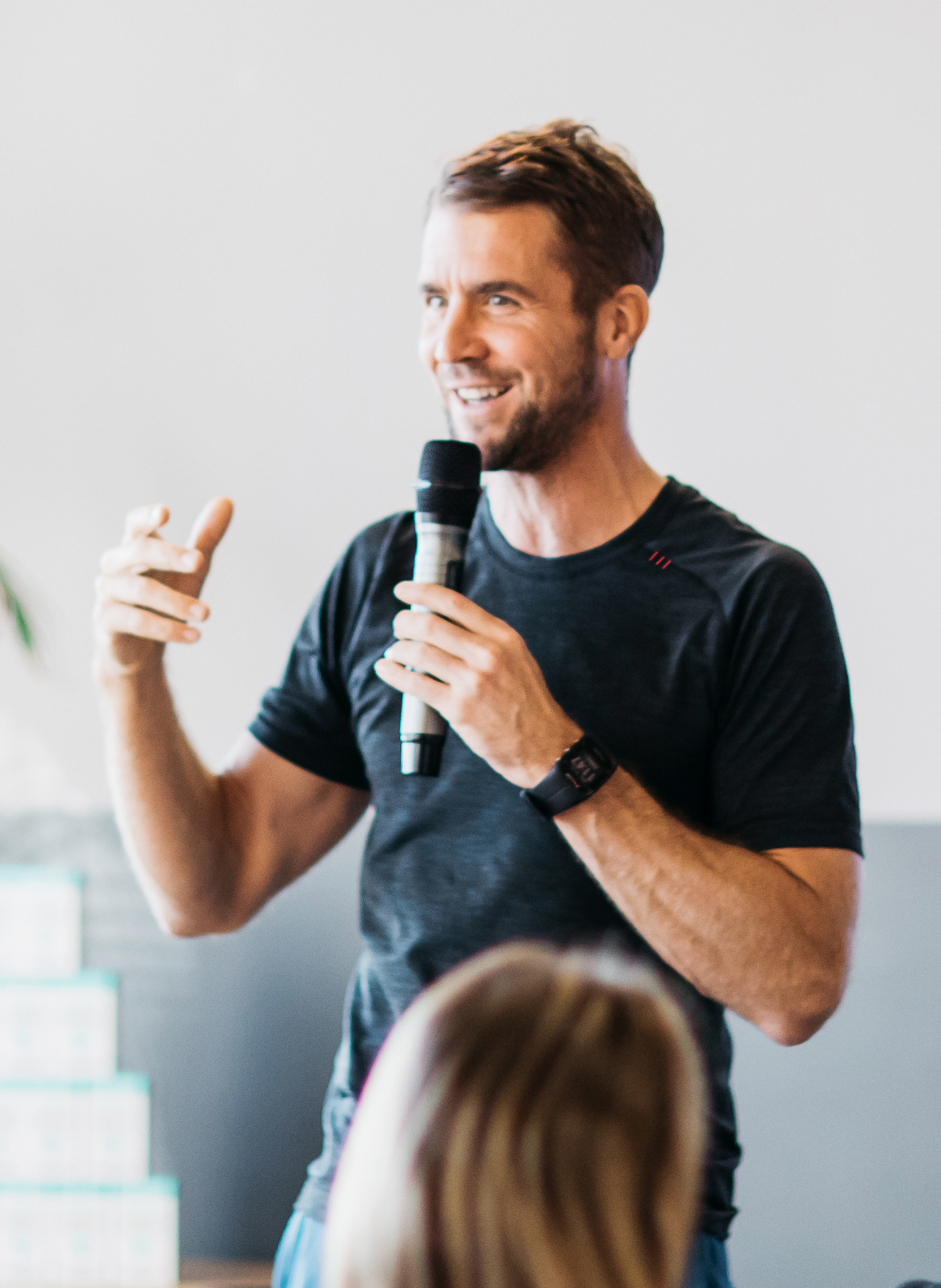
- Leon Taylor talks to a group about mental wellness

Personal information
- Full name: Leon Roy Taylor
- Born: 2 November 1977 (age 48) Cheltenham, Gloucestershire, England
- Home town: Sheffield, South Yorkshire, England
- Height: 178 cm (5 ft 10 in)

Sport
- Country: Great Britain
- Events: 10 m platform, 10 m synchro
- Partner: Peter Waterfield
- Retired: 29 May 2008
Medal record
Men's diving
Representing Great Britain
Olympic Games
Silver medal – second place	2004 Athens	10 m synchro
World Championships
Bronze medal – third place	2005 Montreal	10 m synchro
European Aquatics Championships
Bronze medal – third place	1999 Istanbul	10 m synchro
Bronze medal – third place	2000 Helsinki	10 m synchro
Representing England
Commonwealth Games
Silver medal – second place	2002 Manchester	10 m platform
Bronze medal – third place	1998 Kuala Lumpur	10 m platform

Leon Roy Taylor (born 2 November 1977) is a former British competitive diver. During his diving career he won medals at all major international events including a silver at the Athens Olympics. Following his retirement from competition, Taylor transitioned to a portfolio of projects. He now speaks about mental wellness, supports the SportsAid charity, teaches yoga and mental wellness, works for an executive performance business and commentates for the BBC.

== Background ==
Taylor was born and educated in Cheltenham where he attended Bournside School. He was hyperactive as a child and his parents were advised to channel his energies and enthusiasm into sport. He was a swimmer and gymnast from the age of two and took up competitive diving when he was eight. By the age of 11 he was a national champion. He trained at Cheltenham Leisure Centre under Dave Turner and then Ian Barr until 1996.

== Diving career ==
Taylor represented Great Britain at three Summer Olympic Games and was a member of the Great Britain team for 16 years winning medals at all major international championships. In the diving events at the 2004 Summer Olympics in Athens, he won the Silver medal in the men's synchronised 10-metre platform, with partner Peter Waterfield. It was Britain's first Olympic diving medal since Brian Phelps in 1960. He had come fourth in the same competition in the 2000 Summer Olympics in Sydney.

Other achievements include Silver in the men's 10 m platform at the 2002 Commonwealth Games (he had won Bronze in 1998), and Bronze in the 10 m synchro at the 1999 European Aquatics Championships. At a national level, Taylor held both the 10 m platform and 10 m synchro titles from 1994 to 2006.

He trained with other members of the British team in the Ponds Forge swimming complex in Sheffield.

In 1998 Leon invented the 5255b; a back 2.5 somersaults, 2.5 twists which at the time was the World's most difficult dive with a tariff of 3.8. Following a rule change in 2009, the dive now carries a tariff of 3.6.

== Retirement and post-competitive career ==
Although Taylor had been planning to compete at the 2008 Summer Olympics, he announced his retirement from competition in May of that year following a number of injuries.

He was awarded an honorary MSc by the University of Chichester in 2005.

Between 2006 – 2008, he completed an HNC (Higher National Certificate) in Business and Finance from Sheffield Hallam University.

Taylor now works as a public speaker, presenter, conference host, BBC commentator and mentor to members of the British team.

In 2010 Taylor published a book on the subject of mentoring: MENTOR - The most important role you were never trained for. This work built on his experience of mentoring many athletes, most notably Olympic medalist Tom Daley.

In January 2013, Taylor was named as a judge on the ITV celebrity diving show Splash!. He returned to judge on the show in its second series, airing in 2014. Taylor had planned, and booked, a once-in-a-lifetime trip to New Zealand with his girlfriend when 'Splash' came about instead.

In 2016 Taylor was part of the BBC commentary team for the diving events at the 2016 Summer Olympics in Rio and for the 2017 World Aquatics Championships.

In 2018, Taylor spoke at the TEDx Clapham event on the subject of managing prolonged mental stress with the aid of physical movement. He has followed this with a series of videos on the subject of stress.

In March 2020, Taylor led a series of exercise routines for the Headspace mobile app.

Taylor's sporting career became the basis of a children's story novel, Leon's Magic Mantra, authored by Sarah Griffiths, who wrote it in collaboration with Taylor by video call during the COVID pandemic. It was launched in June 2022.

== Personal life ==
Taylor has a son, Ziggy, with partner Allie Hill.

== Bibliography ==
- Taylor, Leon (1 May 2011). MENTOR: The Most Important Role You Were Never Trained For. Soap Box Books. ISBN 978-1907261046.
