= List of GMTV presenters and reporters =

List of GMTV presenters and reporters shows the on air team for the various shows broadcast by GMTV on ITV between 1 January 1993 and 3 September 2010. At this point GMTV was replaced by ITV Breakfast and Daybreak was launched, with new shows and presenters.

== Presenters ==
=== Programme presenters ===
Person	Tenure(s)	Title	Subsequent position(s)
Fiona Armstrong	1993	GMTV presenter	News presenter for BBC News Channel And ITV News Lookaround
Fern Britton	1993	Top of the Morning presenter	Hosted Ready Steady Cook (1994-2000), This Morning (1999-2009) & Fern Britton Meets (2009-present)
Michael Wilson	1993–1995; 2010	GMTV presenter; Business analyst	Author
Anne Davies	1993–2001	GMTV, GMTV Today and GMTV Newshour presenter and newsreader	Presenter for East Midlands Today
Amanda Redington	1993–2003	GMTV, Top of the Morning and GMTV Today presenter	
Eamonn Holmes	1993–2005	GMTV and GMTV Today presenter	Presenter for Sunrise and This Morning
Fiona Phillips	1993–2008; 2010	Entertainment correspondent, GMTV, LK Today and GMTV Today presenter; GMTV with Lorraine guest presenter	Daily Mirror columnist
Penny Smith	1993–2010	GMTV, GMTV Today newsreader and GMTV Newshour presenter	BBC London Breakfast Show Presenter & Newspaper Reviewer on BBC News Channel
Lorraine Kelly	1993–2010	GMTV with Lorraine and GMTV presenter	Presenter for Daybreak (2012-2014) and Lorraine (2010–present)
Ross Kelly	1993–2000	GMTV Presenter, newsreader and reporter.	
Anthea Turner	1994–1996	GMTV presenter	Appeared on Dancing on Ice, The Jump, Celebrity Big Brother
John Stapleton	1994–2010	GMTV Newshour presenter	Special Correspondent and presenter for Daybreak (2010-2014) Stand in Presenter for Good Morning Britain (2014-2015)
Vanessa Feltz	1995–1996	Top of the Morning presenter	Columnist for Daily Express and Reveal; presenter for BBC London 94.9 and BBC Radio 2
Matthew Lorenzo	1995–1999	GMTV Newshour presenter	Presenter for Sky Sports
Alastair Stewart	1994–2001	The Sunday Programme presenter	Co-newscaster of ITV News at 6:30
Jenni Falconer	2000–2009	Entertainment Today presenter and entertainment correspondent	Radio presenter on Heart, Guest host & Reporter for This Morning
Kate Garraway	2000–2010	GMTV, GMTV Today presenter	Presenter for Daybreak (2010-2014), Good Morning Britain (2014-present) and Lorraine (2010-2014) & Presenter on Smooth Radio
Ben Shephard	2000–2010	Entertainment Today, GMTV Today, GMTV presenter	Presenter for Sky Sports,(2010–present) Tipping Point and Good Morning Britain (2014–present)
Andrew Castle	2000–2010	GMTV Today, GMTV presenter	Tennis Star, GMTV Presenter, Smooth Radio Presenter]
Steve Richards	2001–2008	The Sunday Programme presenter	Chief political commentator for The Independent and columnist for London Evening Standard
Michael Underwood	2005–2008	Entertainment Today presenter and entertainment correspondent	Radio presenter on Heart Wiltshire & Computer Game Reviewer for Talksport
Emma Crosby	2009–2010	GMTV presenter	Presenter for 5 News

=== Newsreaders ===
Person	Tenure(s)	Title	Related notes	Subsequent position(s)
Jacqui Harper	1993			
Jo Sheldon	1994–1996	The Sunday Programme newsreader		
Kate Garraway	1996	The Sunday Programme newsreader		Presenter for Daybreak and Lorraine
Dawn Adams	1999-2000, 2004			Guest host for Lorraine Live in 1999 and 2000
Jen Sweeney	1999			Guest host for LK Today in 2007 and 2008
Claudia Sermbezis	2006–2008	The Sunday Programme newsreader		News Correspondent for South East Today
Priya Kaur-Jones	2007–2009	GMTV Newshour newsreader		
Helen Fospero	2009–2010	GMTV and GMTV Newshour newsreader	Stand-in presenter; former Showbiz and US correspondent (1997–2002)	Daybreak and Lorraine stand-in newsreader/presenter (2010-2014), Reporter for the One Show (2014–present)
Edward Baran	2006	GMTV Newshour stand-in newsreader		

=== Weather presenters ===
Person	Tenure(s)	Title	Related notes
Sally Meen	1993–1997		
Derek Brockway	1996–1997		Meteorologist for the Met Office at BBC Wales
Andrea McLean	1997–2008	Stand-in presenter	Presenter of Loose Women
Simon Keeling	1998-2003		
Ian McCaskill	1999		
Clare Nasir	2000–2010	Weather producer	Freelance weather presenter for ITV News London and 5 News
Kirsty McCabe	2009–2010		Weather presenter for Reporting Scotland

=== Sport presenters ===
Person	Tenure(s)	Title	Subsequent position(s)
Andy Steggall	1993	Sport presenter	Presenter of "Late Kick Off"
Bob Wilson	1994-August 2000	Sport presenter	Presenter of GMTV
Peter Drury	September 2000 – 2009	Sport presenter	ITV Sport football commentator
Dan Lobb	2010	Sport presenter	Guest Presenter for Talksport (2013–present)

=== Children's presenters ===
Person	Tenure(s)	Title	Subsequent position(s)
Pippa Ford-Jones	1993	Presenter of Saturday Disney	
Stuart Miles	1993–1994	Presenter of Saturday Disney	Presenter of the Breakfast Show on Heart Home Counties
Carmen Ejogo	1993–1996	Presenter of Saturday Disney	
Dave Benson Phillips	1996–1998	Presenter of Wake Up In The Wild Room	Presenter of Fun Song Factory
Jack Stratton	1998–2000	Presenter of Diggit	
Fearne Cotton	1998–2001	Presenter of The Disney Club and Diggit	Presenter on BBC Radio 1 and panelist on Celebrity Juice
Paul Ballard	1998–2002	Presenter of Diggit	Presenter of Sportsround
Victoria Hickson	2001–2002	Presenter of Diggit	
Laura Jaye	2001–2002	Presenter of Diggit	
Liam Dolan	2002–2005	Presenter of Diggin' It	Presenter on Roulette Nation (Challenge Jackpot)
Abbie Pethullis	2002–2005	Presenter of Diggin' It	
Jamie Rickers	2002–2010	Presenter of Up on the Roof, Toonattik and Action Stations!	Presenter of Jamie & Anna's U-Pick Summer on Nickelodeon
Phil Gallagher	2003–2005	Presenter of Diggin' It	Appears as lead character in Mister Maker
Anna Williamson	2005–2010	Presenter of Toonattik and Action Stations!	Presenter of Jamie & Anna's U-Pick Summer on Nickelodeon
Kerry Newell	2005–2006	Presenter of Wakey! Wakey!	Presenter of Fun Song Factory
Sue Monroe	2006–2009	Presenter of Wakey! Wakey!	Author
Mandisa Nakana Taylor	2009–2010	Presenter of The Fluffy Club	
Emma Lee	2010	Presenter of The Fluffy Club (Maternity leave cover for Mandisa Nakana Taylor)	

=== Guest presenters ===
Person	Tenure(s)	Title	Subsequent position(s)
Esther McVey	1999	GMTV presenter (Fiona Phillips maternity cover)	Conservative Party MP
Myleene Klass	2007; 2008; 2010	High Street Fashion Awards judge LK Today; GMTV with Lorraine guest presenter	Presenter on Loose Women (2014–present)
Michael Fish	2009	Weather presenter (Clare Nasir maternity cover)	
Philippa Tomson	2009	Weather presenter (Clare Nasir maternity cover)	Freelance news presenter and reporter for Sky News
Bill Neely	2010	GMTV Election 2010 presenter	International editor for ITV News
James Mates	2010	GMTV Election 2010 presenter	Europe Editor and newscaster for ITV News
Mary Nightingale	2010	GMTV Election 2010 presenter	Co-newscaster of ITV News at 6:30
Julie Etchingham	2010	GMTV Election 2010 presenter	Co-newscaster of ITV News at Ten
Nina Hossain	2010	GMTV with Lorraine guest presenter	Presenter for ITV News London and newscaster for ITV News
Ruth Langsford	2010	GMTV with Lorraine guest presenter	Presenter for This Morning
Emma Bunton	2010	GMTV with Lorraine guest presenter	Radio presenter on Heart and Heart London
Kirsty Gallacher	2010	GMTV with Lorraine guest presenter	Presenter for Sky Sports News
Andrea Byrne	2010	GMTV cover newsreader	Presenter for ITV News Cymru Wales and newscaster for ITV News
Gail Porter	2010	Guest TV critic and entertainment reporter	
Lucie Cave	2009–2010	Guest TV critic	Features editor of Heat
Sam & Mark	2010	Guest TV critics	CBBC presenters,
Rachel Stevens	2010	Guest TV critic	Singer
Kelly Cates	2010	Guest sports presenter	ESPN and ITV Sport presenter
Gráinne Seoige	2010	Guest presenter, sports and TV critic cover	Daybreak Presenter & Reporter (2010-2011), Presenter of That's Britain (2011)

== Correspondents and reporters ==
Person	Tenure(s)	Title	Related notes	Subsequent position(s)
Siân Evans	1992-1995	South West Correspondent		Sky Sports Correspondent and BBC Midlands Today Presenter
Michael Hastings	1993	Political Correspondent		
Carol Vorderman	1993	Technology Correspondent		Presenter on Loose Women (2011-2014), Countdown (1982-2008) & Pride of Britain Awards (1999–present)
Rhonda Shear	1993–1997	Hollywood Correspondent		
Sue Saville	1993–1998	Chief Correspondent		Medical Correspondent on ITV News
Stephen Jardine	1993–1999	News Correspondent		Presenter of The Hour (STV)
Lucy van den Brul	1993–1999	News Correspondent		
Steve Chalke	1993–1999	News Correspondent	Stand-in presenter	Christian minister and educationalist
Ross King	1993–2010	Entertainment Correspondent		Los Angeles Correspondent for Daybreak and Lorraine
Sue Jameson	1993–2010	Westminster Correspondent	Former Moscow Correspondent	Political Editor for Daybreak
Dr. Hilary Jones	1993–2010	Health and Medical advisor	Appeared on TV-am	Health Editor for Daybreak
Sally Eden	1996–1999	News Correspondent		Presenter of World News Report
Helen Fospero	1997-2002	Showbiz & US Correspondent	Showbiz Correspondent (1997-2000); US Correspondent (2000-2002)	Reporter for the One Show & BBC Watchdog (2014–present)
Anna Thomas	1998	News Correspondent		
Stephen Lee	1998–2009	News Correspondent	Newsreader	Chief Producer, SBS World News Australia
Rachel Harrison	1998–1999; 2001–2010	News Correspondent	Former US correspondent	
Jackie Kabler	1998–2008	Midlands Correspondent		QVC presenter
Donna Bernard	1999-2000	New York, Specials Correspondent		Presenter ITV West, Newsreader Arise News
Jackie Brambles	1999–2005	Showbiz Correspondent		BBC Radio Scotland presenter
Tiffany Royce	1999–2000; 2006–2010	News Correspondent	Former researcher and runner	News Correspondent for Daybreak
Carla Romano	2000–2010	Los Angeles Correspondent	Stand-in presenter	
Lara Logan	2000–2010	News Correspondent		Chief foreign correspondent, CBS News
Richard Gaisford	2000–2010	Chief Correspondent	Former News Correspondent	Chief Correspondent for Daybreak
Jonathan Swain	2001–2010	Senior Correspondent	Former News Correspondent	Senior News Correspondent for Daybreak
Emma-Louise Johnston	2002–2007	News Correspondent		
Matt Arnold	2003–2010	News Correspondent		
Cordelia Kretzschmar	2003–2010	News Correspondent	Stand-in newsreader; former New York correspondent	Senior News Correspondent for Daybreak
Michelle Morrison	2003–2010	News Correspondent		News Correspondent for Daybreak
Gloria De Piero	2003–2010	Political Correspondent		MP for the Labour Party
Oruj Defoite	2004–2010	News Correspondent	Stand-in newsreader	
Alan Fisher	1993-2005	Chief Correspondent		Al Jazeera English
Janet Street-Porter	2005	Reporter for LK Today		Loose Women panelist
Spencer Hawken	2005–2007	Consumer Correspondent		Actor and freelance journalist
Anna Thomas	2005–2008	News Correspondent		
Nick Dixon	2005–2010	News Correspondent	Stand-in newsreader	News Correspondent for Daybreak
Sarah Moore	2006–2010	News Correspondent		
Julian Druker	2007–2008	News Correspondent		News Correspondent for 5 News
Amanda Sergeant	2007–2008	News Correspondent	Stand-in newsreader	
Elaine Willcox	2007–2010	North of England Correspondent		News Correspondent for Granada Reports
Marcella Whittingdale now at BBC South East Today	2007–2010	News Correspondent / Northern Correspondent	Newsreader	
Miranda Schunke	2007–2010	News Correspondent		
Edward Baran	2008	News Correspondent		
Richard Mackney	2009	News Correspondent		Freelance journalist
Loveday Kitto	2009–2010	News Correspondent		Freelance journalist
Emma Pyne	2009–2010	News Correspondent		Freelance journalist
Aisling McVeigh	2009–2010	News Correspondent		Journalist with BBC Breakfast

== Experts ==
Person	Tenure(s)	Title	Subsequent position(s)
Liz Earle	1995–1999	Beauty and Wellbeing expert	Liz Earle's Lifestyle host
Kate Shapland	1998–1999	Beautician	
Claire Rae	2010	Make-up artist	
Richard Ward	2005–2010	Hair stylist	
Lowri Turner	1993	Stylist	The Wright Stuff panellist and columnist for the Western Mail
Glen Campbell	1999	Stylist	
Caryn Franklin	2002	Stylist	
Mark Heyes	2003–2010	Stylist	Stylist on Lorraine
Amanda Ursell	2009	Nutritionist	
Mr Motivator	1993–1996; 2009	Fitness expert	Entrepreneur
Jo Elvin	2007; 2008	High Street Fashion Awards judge LK Today	
Beechy Colclough	1995–1996	Therapist	
Jasmine Birtles	2005	Shopping expert	Author, journalist and financial expert
Martin Lewis	2009–2010	Financial expert	Financial expert on Daybreak and Lorraine
Richard Barber	1993	Agony Uncle	
John Taylor	1993	Lawyer	
Paul Gambaccini	1993–1996	Film critic	Presenter on BBC Radio 2
Antonia Quirke	2000	Film critic	
Jimmy Greaves	1993	TV critic	Author
Matthew Wright	1998–2000	TV critic	Presenter of The Wright Stuff
Richard Arnold	2000–2010	TV critic	Showbiz Editor on Daybreak, UK Entertainment correspondent on Sunrise, presenter on LBC 97.3
Tina Baker	2001–2008	Soaps expert	
Claire Sweeney	2010	Chefs at Sea presenter	Actress
Bryn Williams	2010	Chef	
Ed Baines	2010	Chef	Chef on Lorraine
Ainsley Harriott	2010	Chef	
Jade Jones	2010	Chef	
Reza Mahammad	2010	Chef	
Paul Merrett	2010	Chef	
Richard Phillips	2010	Chef	Chef on Lorraine
Theo Randall	2010	Chef	
Paul Rankin	2010	Chef	
Rosemary Shrager	2010	Chef	
James Tanner	2010	Chef	Chef on Lorraine
Marcus Wareing	2010	Chef	
Anthony Worrall Thompson	2010	Chef	
Aldo Zilli	2010	Chef	
Victoria Derbyshire	2010	Newspaper reviewer	Newspaper reviewer on Lorraine
Mark Durden-Smith	2010	Newspaper reviewer	Rugby presenter on ESPN
Jasmine Dotiwala	2010	Newspaper reviewer	
Alexandra Fletcher	2010	Newspaper reviewer	
Julia Hartley-Brewer	2010	Newspaper reviewer	
Jacqui Joseph	2010	Newspaper reviewer	
Kevin Maguire	2010	Newspaper reviewer	Newspaper reviewer on Lorraine
Martel Maxwell	2010	Newspaper reviewer	Newspaper reviewer on Lorraine
Melinda Messenger	2010	Newspaper reviewer	
Aasmah Mir	2010	Newspaper reviewer	Newspaper reviewer on Lorraine
Kevin O'Sullivan	2010	Newspaper reviewer	Newspaper reviewer on Lorraine, TV critic on The Wright Stuff
Dean Piper	2010	Newspaper reviewer	Newspaper reviewer on Lorraine
Dawn Porter	2010	Newspaper reviewer	
Celia Walden	2010	Newspaper reviewer	Newspaper reviewer on Lorraine
Dan Wootton	2010	Newspaper reviewer	Showbiz expert on Lorraine
