= BBC Studioworks =

Television studio provider in the United Kingdom

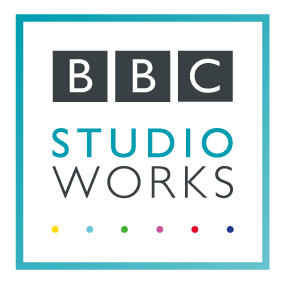
- Formerly: BBC Resources Limited (1998–2009); BBC Studios and Post Production Limited (2009–2016)
- Type: Public subsidiary
- Industry: Broadcasting
- Predecessor: BBC Studios and Post Production Ltd.
- Founded: 1998; 28 years ago
- Headquarters: Television Centre, London, England
- Area served: United Kingdom
- Parent: BBC
- Website: bbcstudioworks.com

BBC Studioworks Limited is a commercial subsidiary of the BBC, providing television studios, post production and related services to the market.

It works with broadcasters and production companies, making content for the likes of the BBC, ITV, Channel 4, Channel 5, Sky, Banijay and Fremantle. Titles range from The Graham Norton Show and A League of Their Own, to EastEnders and Strictly Come Dancing.

When BBC Television Centre in West London was temporarily closed for redevelopment in 2013, Studioworks consolidated its London studios business onto two sites in Borehamwood, BBC Elstree Centre and Elstree Studios. On the BBC Elstree Site, it operates the Studio D facility – a large TV studio and home to Children in Need and BBC News' election broadcasting. It is also home to the company's post-production village and the site where it provides studio and post-production services to EastEnders. Across the road at Elstree Studios, it hires a mix of stages which have been converted into TV studios and range in size from 7,550 sq ft to 15,770 sq ft. This conversion was financed on a co-investment basis between Elstree Studios and Studioworks. BBC Studioworks expanded its footprint in 2017 when it reopened Television Centre, where it operates Studios 1, 2 and 3 plus post-production facilities.

The company changed its named from BBC Studios and Post Production Ltd to BBC Studioworks Ltd in May 2016.

== History ==
The company was originally established as the much broader BBC Resources Ltd operation in 1998, making an operating profit of £1.3 million in its first full year. It was divided into four business units: BBC Studios, BBC Post Production, BBC Outside Broadcasts, and BBC Costume and Wigs.

A team led by Andrew Thornton was appointed by the BBC to manage the sale, with Ernst & Young acting as external advisers. The team were accountable to a BBC steering group including Zarin Patel and Peter Salmon. Advertisements were placed in the Financial Times, The Times and Broadcast on 16 August 2007 inviting expressions of interest for the acquisition of this commercial subsidiary, with the aim of completing the transfer of engagements by the end of March 2008, subject to contract negotiations and approvals.

On 6 November 2007 The Guardian reported that the privatisation could be left with a shortfall of up to £15m to cover the transfer of the pensions of BBC Resources staff to a potential new employer.

The BBC has never released the names of the short-listed companies, with The Guardian reporting – in early 2008 – more leaks over concerns about pension obligations and asbestos exposure. On 7 March 2008 it was announced that the outside broadcast division would be sold, as expected, to Satellite Information Services – with a surprise announcement that the studios operation (employing around 350 staff at Television Centre and Elstree Centre) would remain in BBC ownership.

The BBC Costume and Wigs division closed in February 2008, as it was no longer commercially viable and the costumes were sold as a going concern to Angels Costumiers. Following a lengthy sales process, which was announced in December 2005 but delayed until August 2007, BBC Outside Broadcasts was sold in March 2008 to SIS Communications.

In August 2008 Mark Thomas became CEO of BBC Resources. On 1 December 2008 the management team announced that nearly 200 jobs would be lost by June 2009 as part of a restructuring move to make the business smaller, more flexible and resilient to changes in demand. This affected up to 38 editors, 26 assistants, as well as operational staff, administration and support staff.

In early June 2008, the fate of the third business was put on hold with the BBC stating that "for the time being, we are no longer actively in discussion with a buyer for Post Production" and that "like Studios, Post Production will remain within BBC Resources, which will continue to operate as a wholly owned commercial subsidiary of the BBC". The BBC staff newspaper Ariel had reported on 18 March that Post's 400 staff had been told that the BBC "may need to look at other solutions if the business is not sold at this stage". Figures show that £3.4m had been spent on "consultants, legal and internal costs" during the sell-off. The sale of BBC Outside Broadcasts generated a profit of £7.7 million.

In April 2009 the company announced it was merging the Studios and Post Production Ltd businesses, changing the company name to BBC Studios and Post Production and appointing a new leadership team. The company made a small trading loss in 2008–09. However, it made a small operating profit in 2009–10.

In 2010, BBC Studioworks made a stereoscopic 3D Strictly Come Dancing trail for Children in Need at Television Centre. Its 3D team, along with 3Ality Digitals Stereographer Scot Steele, provided full studio and post production services for the three-minute 3D film featuring an Argentinean tango.

In September 2012, Anna Mallett joined BBC Studio and Post Production as CEO and led the company through the move out of Television Centre into two new locations – Elstree Studios and South Ruislip.

In October 2014, Anna Mallet left the company to take the lead in developing production proposals within the wider BBC. David Conway was appointed Managing Director of BBC Studios and Post Production from the role of Chief Operation Officer, which he held from May 2012.

In March 2017, BBC Studioworks announced that they and Elstree Studios will continue their partnership for at least another three years, until March 2020.

On 25 November 2019 BBC Studioworks confirmed that they have renewed their partnership with Elstree Studios, and have extended the current arrangement to continue until at least March 2024.

In August 2022 it was announced by BBC Studioworks that they had extended their deal with Elstree Studios until 2029, with the agreement for BBC Studioworks to operate Stages 8 and 9 until March 2029, with BBC Studiosworks taking full control of the George Lucas Stage 2 until at least December 2024

As of June 2024, the BBC Studioworks deal with Elstree Studios had to be adjusted, due to the closure of Stages 8 and 9 due to those studios being unsafe to be used, and are set to be demolished. BBC Studioworks now operates the George Lucas Stage 1 alongside their already operating the George Lucas Stage 2. They have also opened a new 2,500 Sq Ft studio named Studio M.

== Studio facilities ==
=== Television Centre ===
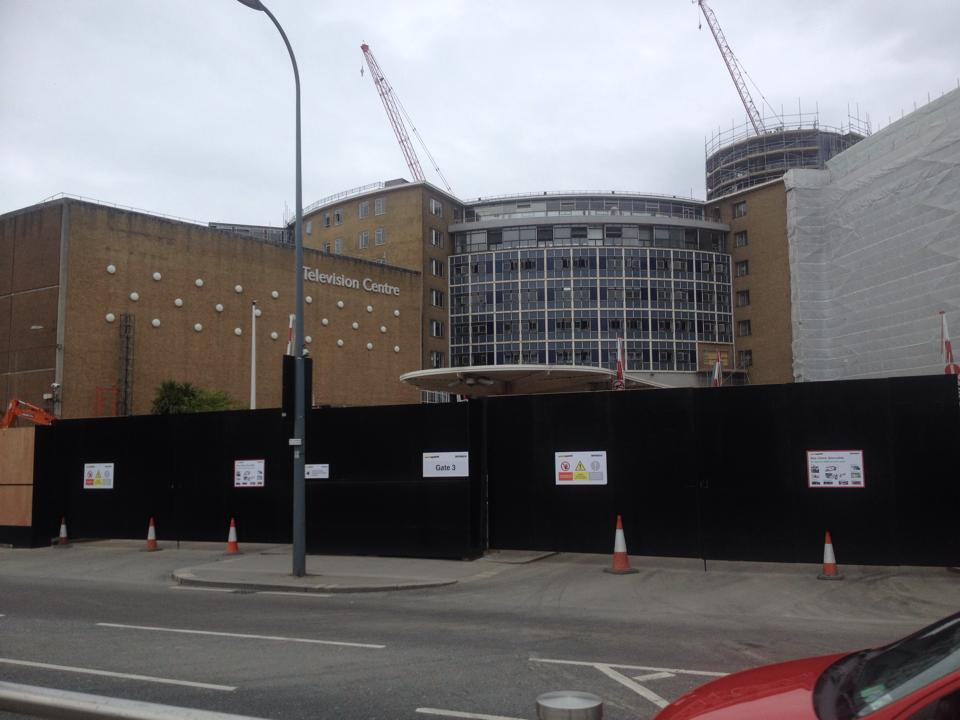
Television Centre being refurbished in 2015

Up until 2013, BBC Studioworks operated four fully equipped permanent HD studios at the then BBC Television Centre in central London. It upgraded its largest studio, Studio TC1 to HD back in 2006 and supported Strictly Come Dancing, which was the first live HD entertainment show in the UK. Studio TC8 followed in 2007 and acted as the hub for the global Live Earth concerts in July of that year, supporting 22 hours of live HD coverage going out to over 135 countries across the world. Studio TC4 was upgraded to HD in September 2008. The last studio to go HD at Television Centre was Studio TC6, also thought to be the UK's first 1080p/50 Hz 3D capable TV studio. Upon the closure of Television Centre in 31 March 2013, Studios 1, 2 and 3 (in addition to other technical areas) were refurbished.

In September 2017, BBC Studioworks re-opened the three studios at Television Centre, alongside a range of post-production facilities and ancillary areas. Studio TC1 became a UHD-capable television studio, equipped with Sony HDC-4300 cameras. TC2 and TC3's galleries and floors were also upgraded, including significant audio-related improvements.

==== ITV Daytime at Television Centre ====
In late 2017 it was announced that BBC Studioworks would provide studio space and production facilities for ITV Daytime programmes, as they prepared to move from The London Studios on the South Bank. ITV would sublet Studios 2 and 3 at Television Centre from BBC Studioworks under a five-year deal, along with production offices and production facilities at Television Centre. ITV Daytime would also hire office facilities in the White City area near Television Centre from Stanhope Developers.

In January 2018, in a joint project between BBC Studioworks and ITV, Studios 2 and 3 were refitted to accommodate the production sets for Lorraine and Loose Women shows in Studio 2 with Good Morning Britain and This Morning in Studio 3. A dedicated production area was created for the ITV Daytime shows adjacent to the studios, along with dressing rooms, green rooms, make-up, wardrobe and hospitality.

In April 2018 the first live editions of Good Morning Britain, Lorraine, This Morning and Loose Women broadcast from Television Centre aired on ITV on Monday 16 April 2018.

In the 3,430 sq ft (319 m^{2}) Studio 2, the sets for Lorraine and Loose Women are non-permanent sets and are moved daily. Peston, the ITV political programme, is also made in Studio 2 on Wednesday evenings. Whilst not an ITV programme, from 13 January 2019 onwards, Channel 4's Sunday Brunch has been made in Studio 2 on Sunday mornings.

In the 8,000 sq ft (740 m^{2}) Studio 3, the sets for Good Morning Britain and This Morning are permanent fixtures in the studio and are built back-to-face.

Originally the plan was to have ITV Daytime shows use the studios at Television Centre for around five years, with ITV Daytime moving back to their old Southbank location in a newly redeveloped and built studio centre. However, in October 2018 it was announced that ITV had dropped their plans to return to the Southbank site. ITV chief executive Carolyn McCall has confirmed they plan to sell all of the South Bank site and will not build the proposed three new smaller studios there. Instead, ITV would remain at Television Centre and extended their sublet agreement with BBC Studioworks and Stanhope Developers.

On 20 May 2025, it was announced that all four ITV Studios Daytime shows would be leaving Television Centre after their final live broadcasts of the year (two years later than originally planned) as part of a wider schedule change that would take effect in January 2026, with Good Morning Britain moving to the headquarters of ITN, and the other three (Lorraine, This Morning and Loose Women) all leaving for The Hospital Club in Covent Garden, a move that was confirmed in September 2025.

=== BBC Elstree Centre ===
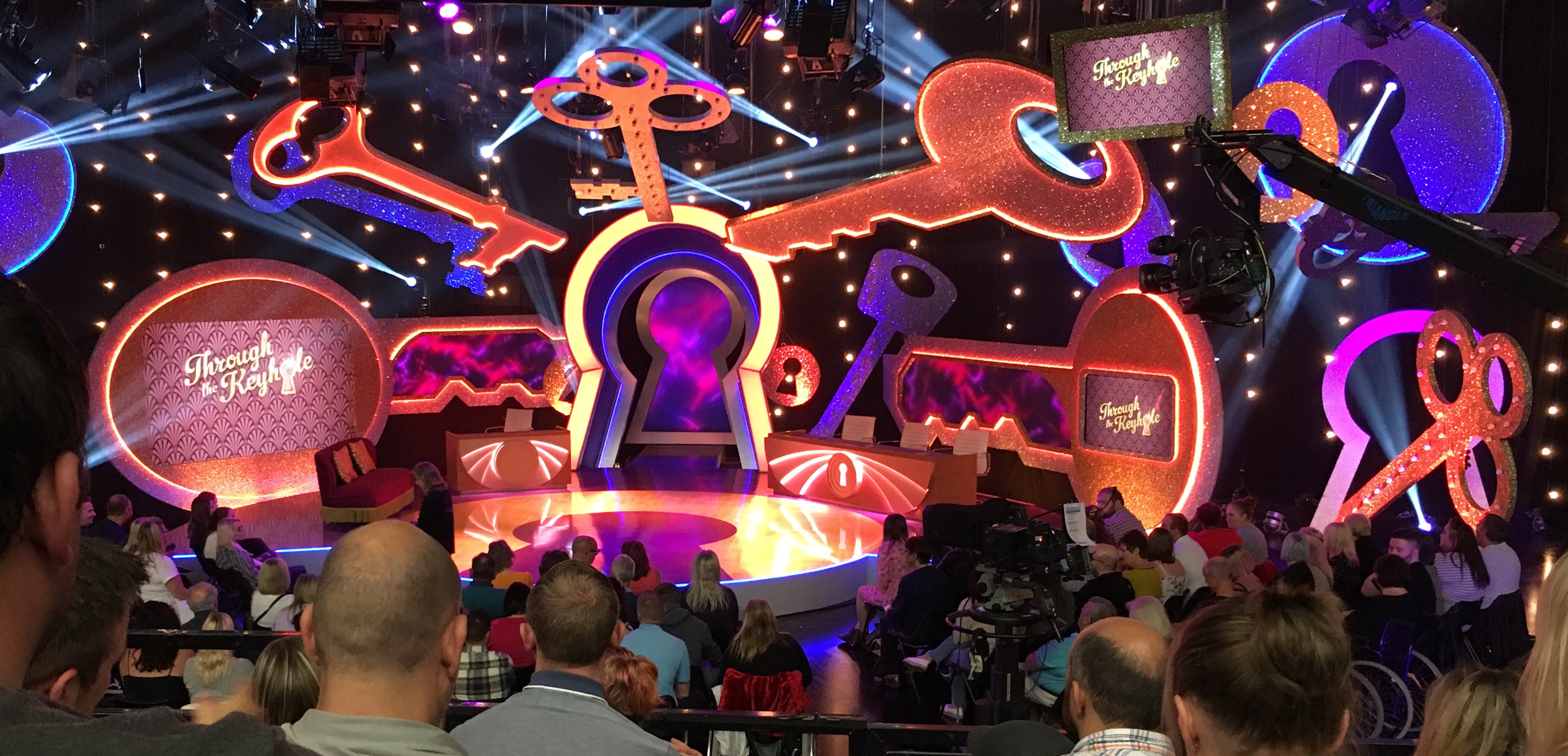
Through the Keyhole is filmed at Studioworks' Elstree D

BBC Studioworks provides facilities at BBC Elstree Centre in Borehamwood. These include the external set for EastEnders and medical drama Holby City. With the sale and partial closure of Television Centre, Studio D at Elstree has since been utilised for many of the BBC's large studio productions; such as Children in Need, and the BBC's 2015 General Election coverage.

In 2010, BBC Studioworks carried out a major technology refresh for EastEnders at its Elstree site in Hertfordshire, introducing new HD and tapeless workflows to support the show as it moved to HD in autumn 2010.

The company's studios and post production facilities in Elstree remain in operation, with BBC Studioworks continuing to provide Studio D on the BBC Elstree site for hire.

=== Elstree Studios ===
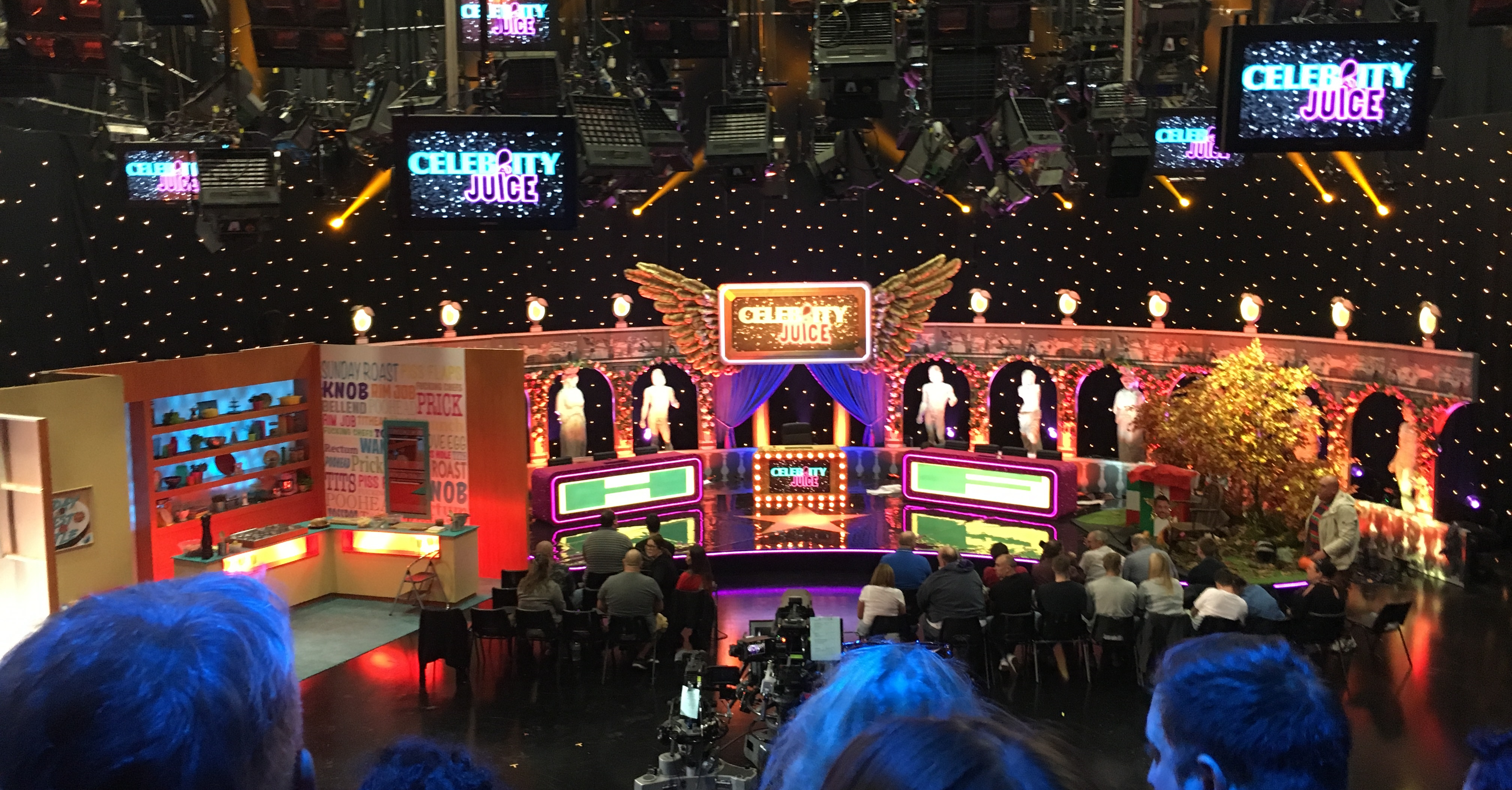
Celebrity Juice is filmed at Elstree Studios

At Elstree Film Studios, co-investments were made to Stage 8 and Stage 9, both 7,500 sq ft (700 m^{2}), by Studioworks and Elstree Studios in 2013 to open them as TV studios. New laser-levelled floors and permanent HD galleries were installed and green rooms and dressing rooms for talent were also improved.

In July 2013, BBC Studioworks completed the build of a brand new gallery suite at the George Lucas Stages at Elstree Film Studios to support large-scale TV productions. The galleries are located on the ground floor with direct access onto Stages 1 and 2 and equipped with HD technology redeployed from BBC Television Centre, as well as new technology and a series of upgrades. These stages have since hosted shows such as Strictly Come Dancing, The Voice and A League of Their Own.

In March 2015, BBC Studioworks upgraded its audio production gallery at the George Lucas Stage to a Studer Vista X large-scale mixing console technology for broadcast.

In March 2017, BBC Studioworks announced that they and Elstree Studios will continue their partnership for at least another three years, until March 2020. BBC Studioworks confirmed "The arrangement with Elstree Studios bolstered Studioworks' existing presence in Elstree, where it already sold Studio D (on the BBC Elstree site) to the market as well as services to other productions resident in the area. However, due to its success at Elstree, Studioworks will expand its business by retaining its enlarged presence in Elstree. This includes both studios and post production operations."

On 25 November 2019, it was announced by BBC Studioworks confirmed that they have renewed their partnership with Elstree Studios, and have extended the current arrangement to continue until at least March 2024.

In August 2022, it was announced by BBC Studioworks that they had extended their deal with Elstree Studios until 2029, with the agreement for BBC Studioworks to operate Stages 8 and 9 until March 2029, with BBC Studioworks taking full control of the George Lucas Stage 2 until at least December 2024.

As of June 2024, the BBC Studioworks deal with Elstree Studios had to be adjusted, due to the closure of Stages 8 and 9 due to those studios being unsafe to be used, and are set to be demolished. BBC Studioworks now operates the George Lucas Stage 1 alongside their already operating the George Lucas Stage 2. They have also opened a new 2,500 sq ft (230 m^{2}) studio named Studio M.

=== Other facilities ===
In October 2010, BBC Studioworks secured a multimillion-pound contract with Endemol, providing studios and post production services for Channel 4's Deal or No Deal at the Paintworks in Bristol. As part of the deal, BBC Studioworks took over the lease of the studio. In 2013, the company then moved the Deal or No Deal production to Bristol City Council's The Bottle Yard Studios when the Paintworks facility was closed for redevelopment.

On 30 September 2022, BBC Studioworks officially launched its Kelvin Hall production hub in Glasgow's West End.

== Post-production and digital media services ==
In March 2011 BBC Studioworks expanded its digital restoration and archive services by investing in Scanity from Digital Film Technology, a 2K film to file scanner. It also installed a new digital Media Hub facility in April 2011, providing centrally managed and highly scalable systems for global file delivery, transcoding, media storage, duplication, library digitisation and file-based quality check services. In autumn 2011 it digitally restored The Trumptonshire Trilogy for DVD and Blu-ray release. This restoration project was met with wide acclaim, including coverage on various TV outlets.

In October 2012, the company announced it would be moving its digital media services business which preserves, re-masters and manages content through its archiving, restoration and digital distribution services, from BBC Television Centre in Central London to a new permanent facility at Odyssey Business Park, South Ruislip from early 2013. The new facility opened in March 2013. In April 2014, BBC Studioworks' Digital Media Services business invested in Front Porch Digital DIVArchive content storage management and DIVAdirector digital asset management systems. Further technology upgrades were made in a TMD Mediaflex asset management system and a Pixit Media Storage solution in 2015.

In October 2015, BBC Studioworks announced plans to realign its business to place more focus on its core services of studios and post production related activity by moving out of certain non-core digital media handling activities. As part of the realignment, the Digital Media Services (DMS) arm of the business, based in South Ruislip, ceased trading in its current form. The company stated that it remains committed to its studio and post production operations in Elstree, and other locations.

== BBC Costume + Wigs ==
Until 2008, BBC Costume and Wigs – trading as part of BBC Resources' Studios division – was the second largest collection of its kind in the UK, after the suppliers Angels The Costumiers. The department closed in February 2008, as it was no longer commercially viable. Its future had been under review for some time and after exploring a range of options, the management team concluded that the best option was to close the department and dispose of the stock.

The initial sale of the collection fell through – the interested party was thought to have been prop hire company Superhire – and on 14 February 2008 the department ceased trading, with a BBC spokeswoman adding that "the arrangements [the corporation] was pursuing have not worked out and BBC Resources is currently inviting interested parties to consider making an offer to purchase."

The costume collection – consisting of over one million items – was eventually sold to costume house Angels and Bermans on 30 March 2008. This allowed for the BBC costume stock to remain within the UK, and be available to British and international TV and film productions in the future.

The collection of wigs was sold separately to The Wig Store Limited; a management buy-out put together by Philippa Devon and Alan Godleman.
