= Sarah Moore =

Sarah Moore may refer to:

- Sarah Moore (journalist), British television reporter, presenter and academic
- Sarah Moore (The Family) (1969–2016), Australian writer who spent her childhood in The Family, a new religious movement
- Sarah Moore (racing driver) (born 1993), English racing driver
- Sarah Wool Moore (1846–1911), artist and art teacher

== See also ==
- Sara Moore (disambiguation)
