= Ross Kelly =

Ross Kelly may refer to:

- Ross Kelly (footballer), Australian rules footballer for West Perth and inaugural chairman of the Fremantle Football Club
- Ross Kelly (soccer) player for Austin Aztex
- Ross Kelly (presenter), Scottish TV presenter
- Ross Kelly (actor) in Klown Kamp Massacre

== See also ==
- Ross O'Carroll-Kelly, fictional Irish character
