= Kelly-Anne Lyons =

American actress

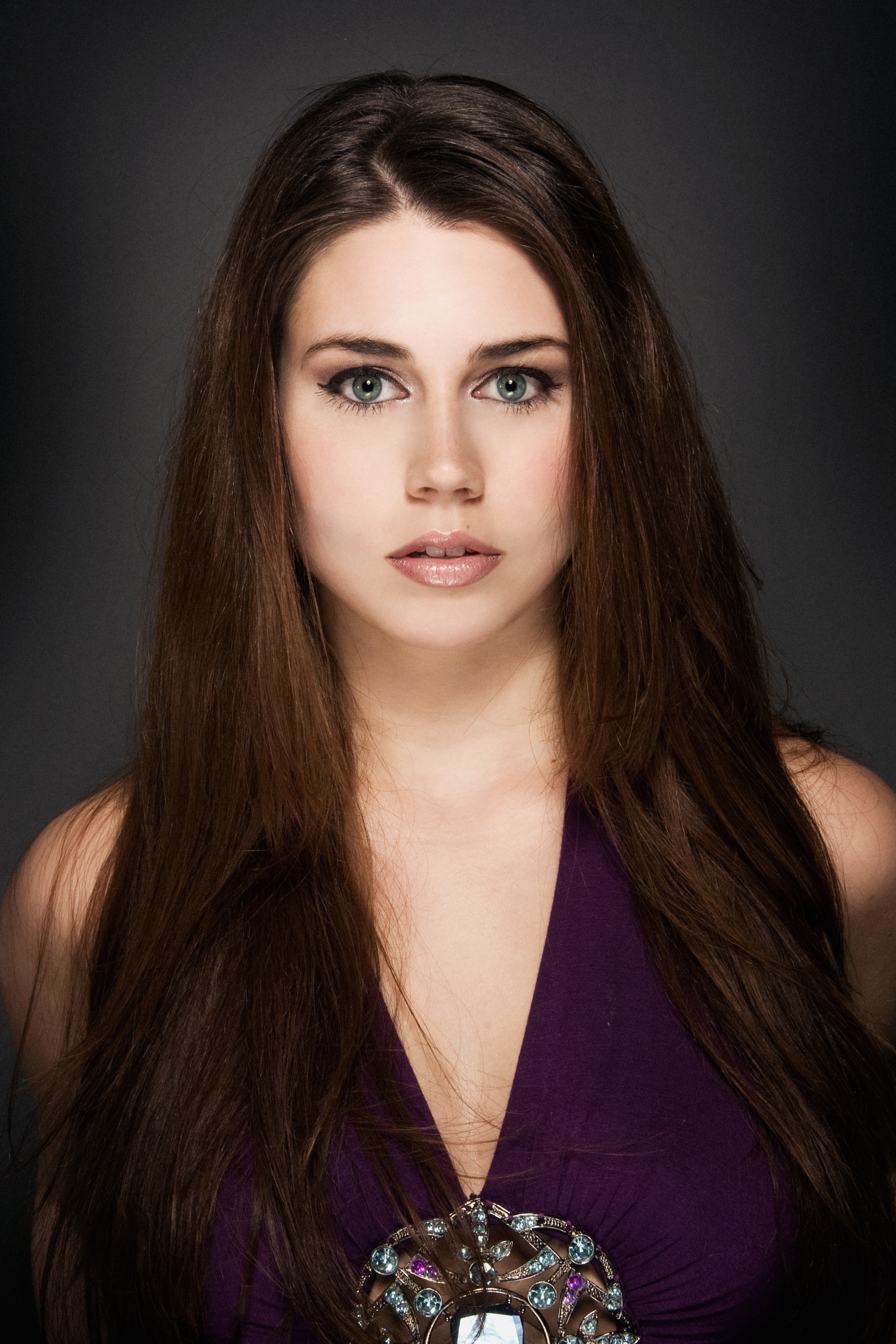
- Kelly-Anne Lyons in 2009
- Born: March 17, 1985 (age 41); New Jersey
- Education: Marymount Manhattan College (B.A.)
- Occupations: Actress, television presenter, writer, model
- Years active: 2007–present
- Television: Dick and Dom's Funny Business
- Website: Kelly-Anne Lyons Official Website

Kelly-Anne Lyons (born March 17, 1985) is an American actress, television presenter, writer and model. Lyons' breakthrough role was as the female lead, Kelly-Anne Manhattan, in the BBC comedy Dick and Dom's Funny Business. Before this, Lyons played the title role in Chelsey: OMG!, produced by British comedy and entertainment company Channel X. She is known for her characters in hidden camera sketch shows such as ITV1’s "Fool Britannia" with Dom Joly and BBC1’s "Richard Hammond’s Secret Service", as well as MTV’s "Flash Prank", Channel 5's "Secret Interview", and National Geographic’s "Ape Man". She plays news anchor "Felicity Bond" in the BAFTA nominated BBC comedy "DNN" and "Tess" in BBC’s sitcom "Badults".

== Early life ==
Born on March 17, 1985 in New Jersey, Lyons' family moved to Winston-Salem, North Carolina when she was five. She went on to study at the North Carolina School of the Arts. Her family returned to New Jersey before she reached her teens, living in the Basking Ridge section of Bernards Township, New Jersey. Lyons studied at Ridge High School from 1999 to 2003. Lyons went on to attend Marymount Manhattan College, where she graduated with a Bachelor of Arts in Psychology. Lyons also trained at the Weist Barron Hill Acting For Television and Film.

== Career ==
Working as a model in New York City while still an undergraduate, Lyons was scouted by an English modeling agency, whom she joined in London a week after her graduation. Lyons has modeled for Special K, The Body Shop, Fila, Fitness First, Microsoft and John Lewis & Partners.

Lyons played the eponymous Chelsey Pucks in the online situation comedy Chelsey: OMG!. The interactive Channel X show for teens, launched in October 2008, was shown on the social networking website Bebo. The show, created by comedian Nat Coombs, was broadcast in two three-minute episodes each week. By August 2009, Chelsey: OMG! had gained close to three million views.

Lyons played the female lead in the children's television series Dick and Dom's Funny Business. The BBC comedy programme was broadcast on BBC Two and simulcast on the CBBC Channel. The series' first episode was shown on 8 January 2011.

Since 2011, Lyons has been Celebrity Supporter for the UK charity Arthritis Care after having suffered from arthritis in her teens. She is currently in remission but plays an active role in the charity's fundraising and awareness campaigns.

Lyons has played many characters across in MTV’s Flash Prank.

Lyons appeared as "Tess" in BBC Three’s sitcom Badults, created by comedy group Pappy's.

Lyons plays news anchor "Felicity Bond" in the CBBC comedy show "DNN". Her co-anchor is comedian William Andrews. The series is currently filming Series 2 after being nominated for Best Comedy at the 2013 Children's British Academy of Film and Television Arts Awards.
