= The Asian Awards =

UK award ceremony

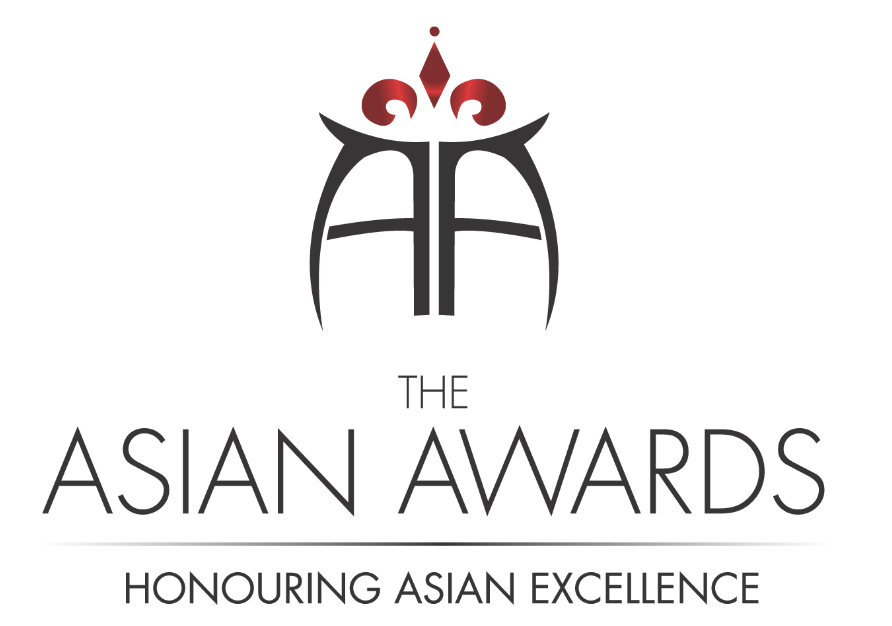
- Logo of The Asian Awards
- Awarded for: Honouring Asian Excellence
- Country: United Kingdom
- Presented by: Paul Sagoo OBE
- First award: 2010; 16 years ago
- Website: www.theasianawards.com

The Asian Awards is an annual award ceremony for the global Asian community which takes place in the United Kingdom, with 14 categories that include business, philanthropy, entertainment, culture and sport. Nominees are selected by an independent judging panel initially co-chaired by Baroness Verma and Nat Wei, Baron Wei then from 2014 onwards Karan Bilimoria, Baron Bilimoria.

In 2010 and 2011, the awards were only open to those born in or with direct family origin from India, Sri Lanka, Pakistan, or Bangladesh. From 2013, they were expanded to include all people of South, East and South East Asian origin.

The tenth edition of the awards is due to take place in 2026 due to the COVID-19 pandemic and other planning delays. It will be hosted in Mumbai for the first time.

== History ==
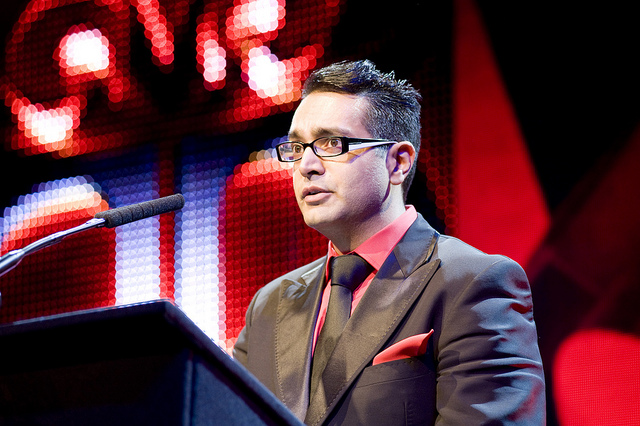
Founder Paul Sagoo at the 2010 Asian Awards

The Asian Awards were founded by businessman Paul Sagoo OBE through his Lemon Group.

== Past awards ==
2010

The 1st Asian Awards took place on 26 October 2010 at Grosvenor House Hotel and was hosted by Lord Sebastian Coe. The 2010 Asian Awards featured a presentation of The Lifetime Achievement Award that was presented to Amitabh Bachchan. A live musical performance was provided by Sonu Nigam. The 2010 Peoples Choice Award, voted entirely by the public, was won by Sachin Tendulkar. On the night itself, images of all winners were broadcast in Times Square.

2011

The 2nd Asian Awards was again hosted by Coe in October 2011. The 2011 Asian Awards featured a presentation of The Lifetime Achievement Award that was presented to Asha Bhosle in addition Coe presented a Guinness World Record for Most Recorded Artist of all time at over 11,000 recordings. The Founder's Award, an award given directly by the founders Paul Sagoo and UBM, was presented posthumously to Freddie Mercury. His mother and sister were presented the award by Freddie's former band member Brian May.

2012

The Asian Awards did not take place in 2012 and no official reason has been cited although the event was moved from its regular October date to April 2013.

2013

The 3rd Asian Awards was hosted by Coe in April 2013. The event was opened by Sagoo and followed by a keynote speech from the UK Chancellor of the Exchequer George Osborne. The awards were expanded to include winners from all Asian countries (China, Singapore, Japan, Hong Kong, Malaysia and others) as well as the traditional South Asian countries from which winners had been honoured previously. Sir Ben Kingsley was given the Fellowship award and the late Bruce Lee was honoured with the Founders Award which was collected by his widow Linda Lee Cadwell.

2014

The 4th Asian Awards was hosted by Nikki Bedi in April 2014. The event was opened by Sagoo who commented on the continued pan-Asian expansion.

In addition to the winners, other notable guests in attendance included Zayn Malik, Simon Hughes, Preeya Kalidas, Jeremy Hunt (politician), Tasmin Lucia-Khan, Amy Willerton, Nitin Ganatra, Nina Wadia, Amol Rajan, Gurinder Chadha and Naughty Boy. Jackie Chan was given the Fellowship award and friend of the late Nelson Mandela, Ahmed Kathrada was honoured with the Founders Award which was presented by Hollywood actor Idris Elba.

2015

The 5th Asian Awards was hosted by previous Asian Awards winner Gok Wan in April 2015. The event was opened by Sagoo followed by the cast of Bend It Like Beckham the Musical who performed a song from the musical. The event was headlined by the British Asian Trust.

In addition to the winners, other notable guests in attendance included Gary Lineker, Preeya Kalidas, Gurinder Chadha, Tasmin Lucia-Khan, Mila Kunis, Nitin Ganatra, Meera Syal, Ozwald Boateng, Colin Jackson, Adil Ray, Kelly Hoppen, Rishi Rich, Russell Peters, Paul Chowdhry, Shabana Azmi, Amar Bose and Naughty Boy. The late founder of the Bose Corporation, Amar Bose was honoured with the Founders Award which was received by his daughter Maya Bose.

Twitter and Post Event Reaction

The Asian Awards trended worldwide on Twitter at the number one spot for over 4 hours and specifically trended in India at the number 1 spot for nearly 2 days. The media particularly commented on the presence of Zayn Malik's attendance as it was the first time since his split from the band One Direction. Post the awards, Sagoo commented (through social media) on the lack of TV coverage from the British television networks.

The Awards also broke two specific Twitter records by having the most tweeted tweet by an Indian (that a picture of Shah Rukh Khan and Zayn Malik)and also the very same tweet was the most popular "Selfie" of 2015.

2016

The 6th Asian Awards was hosted by Alistair McGowan on 8 April 2016. The event was opened by Founder Paul Sagoo who discussed the issues of diversity within award ceremonies and how The Asian Awards were to be opened up to people with non-Asian backgrounds.

In addition to the winners, other notable guests in attendance included Hollywood actress Lindsay Lohan, footballer Jamie Vardy, Keith Vaz, Manish Bhasin, Emeli Sandé, Sanjeev Bhaskar, London Mayoral candidates Zac Goldsmith and Sadiq Khan, Nitin Ganatra, Gurinder Chadha and Alex Reid (fighter). Mother Teresa was honoured with the Founders Award which was accepted by her closest living relative Agi Bojaxhiu.

2017

The 7th Asian Awards was hosted by Bhaskar in May 2017 at The London Hilton on Park Lane. The event was opened by Sagoo who discussed diversity in television and how many of the main UK channels are failing their own diversity targets. It was also mentioned that The Asian Awards would honour its second recipient with a non-Asian background. The Rising Star award also made its debut this year with the star of the Oscar nominated film Lion Sunny Pawar receiving it. It was noted that he had been snubbed by other award ceremonies including the Oscars and thus The Asian Awards were "correcting" this mistake.

In addition to the winners, other notable guests in attendance included Bollywood actors Anupam Kher and Varun Dhawan, Amy Jackson, Adil Ray, Sanjeev Bhaskar, The London Mayoral Sadiq Khan and Naughty Boy. Sachin Tendulkar was honoured with the Fellowship Award only the 4th person in history to receive it.

2018

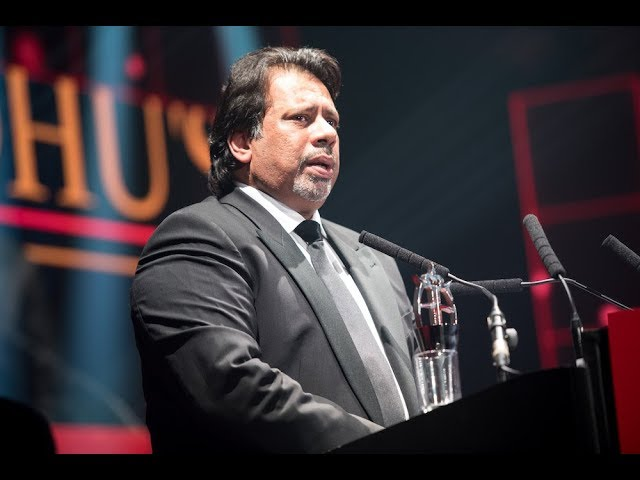
Jahangir Khan at the 2018 Asian Awards

The 8th Asian Awards were once again hosted by Sanjeev Bhaskar on 27 April 2018 at The London Hilton on Park Lane. It was noted that the 8th Awards honoured the most number of women in their history to date. Legendary actress, the late Sridevi, was posthumously honoured with the Outstanding Achievement in Cinema award.

In addition to the winners, other notable guests in attendance included squash legend Jahangir Khan, television personalities Anthea Turner, Francine Lewis, Russell Kane, Emma Noble, actress Gemma Oaten, film director Gurinder Chadha, Adil Ray, Manish Bhasin, sportswoman Elise Christie and previous honouree Naughty Boy.

2019

The 9th Asian Awards again hosted by Sanjeev Bhaskar on 12 April 2019 at The Grosvenor House Hotel on Park Lane. The centenary anniversary of the Jalianwala Bagh Massacre was marked with the Founders award presented to the nephew of freedom fighter Bhagat Singh.

== Award categories ==
- Lifetime Achievement Award
- Entrepreneur of the Year
- Business Leader of the Year
- Public Servant of the Year
- Social Entrepreneur of the Year
- Philanthropist of the Year
- Founder's Award (Introduced in 2011)
- Fellowship Award (Introduced in 2011)
- People's Choice Award
- The Rising Star Award (Introduced in 2017)
- Outstanding Achievement in Cinema
- Outstanding Achievement in Sports
- Outstanding Achievement in Music
- Outstanding Achievement in Television
- Outstanding Achievement in Art & Design
- Outstanding Achievement in Science & Technology (Introduced in 2011)
- Outstanding Contribution to Sustainability (Introduced in 2013)
- Outstanding Contribution to the Community (Introduced in 2016)
- Outstanding Achievement Online (Introduced in 2019)

== Winners ==
=== 1st Awards ===
The following were recipients at the 1st Asian Awards 2010.

- Lifetime Achievement Award - Amitabh Bachchan
- Entrepreneur of the Year - Vijay Mallya
- Business Leader of the Year - Ratan Tata
- Public Servant of the Year - Zarin Patel
- Social Entrepreneur of the Year - Muhammad Yunus
- Philanthropist of the Year - Sunil Mittal
- People's Choice Award - Sachin Tendulkar
- Outstanding Achievement in Cinema - Yash Chopra
- Outstanding Achievement in Sports - Sachin Tendulkar
- Outstanding Achievement in Music - A R Rahman
- Outstanding Achievement in Television - George Alagiah
- Outstanding Achievement in Art & Design - Abu Jani & Sandeep Khosla

=== 2nd Awards ===
The following were recipients at the 2nd Asian Awards.

- Fellowship Award - Ravi Shankar
- Lifetime Achievement Award - Asha Bhosle
- Entrepreneur of the Year - KP Singh
- Business Leader of the Year - Anand Mahindra
- Public Servant of the Year - Irene Khan
- Social Entrepreneur of the Year - Bunker Roy
- Philanthropist of the Year - Shiv Nadar
- Outstanding Achievement in Science and Technology - Amit Singhal
- Founder's Award - Freddie Mercury
- People's Choice Award - Amir Khan (British boxer)
- Outstanding Achievement in Cinema - Akshay Kumar
- Outstanding Achievement in Sports - Muttiah Muralitharan
- Outstanding Achievement in Music - Jay Sean
- Outstanding Achievement in Television - Meera Syal
- Outstanding Achievement in Art & Design - Russell Peters

=== 3rd Awards ===
The following were recipients at the 3rd Asian Awards.

- Fellowship Award - Ben Kingsley
- Entrepreneur of the Year - Adi Godrej
- Business Leader of the Year - Jiang Jianqing
- Social Entrepreneur of the Year - Masa Kogure
- Philanthropist of the Year - N. R. Narayana Murthy
- Outstanding Achievement in Science and Technology - Ajay Bhatt
- Outstanding Contribution to Sustainability - Ravi Ruia
- Founder's Award - Bruce Lee
- Outstanding Achievement in Cinema - Anupam Kher
- Outstanding Achievement in Sports - Kamui Kobayashi
- Outstanding Achievement in Music - Nicole Scherzinger
- Outstanding Achievement in Television - Nina Wadia
- Outstanding Achievement in Art & Design - Hanif Kureishi

=== 4th Awards ===
The following were recipients at the 4th Asian Awards which took place on 4 April 2014.

- Founder's Award - Ahmed Kathrada
- Fellowship Award - Jackie Chan
- Entrepreneur of the Year - Lui Che Woo
- Business Leader of the Year - Cyrus Poonawalla
- Public Servant of the Year - Salil Shetty
- Outstanding Achievement in Science and Technology - Venkatraman Ramakrishnan
- Outstanding Achievement in Cinema - Irrfan Khan
- Outstanding Achievement in Sports - MS Dhoni
- Outstanding Achievement in Music - Norah Jones
- Outstanding Achievement in Television - Gok Wan
- Outstanding Achievement in Art & Design - David Tang

=== 5th Awards ===
The following were recipients at the 5th Asian Awards which took place on 17 April 2015.

- Founder's Award - Amar Bose
- Entrepreneur of the Year - Jack Ma
- Business Leader of the Year - Hinduja Group
- Outstanding Achievement in Science and Technology - Tejinder Virdee
- Outstanding Achievement in Cinema - Shah Rukh Khan
- Outstanding Achievement in Sports - Kumar Sangakkara
- Outstanding Achievement in Music - Zayn Malik
- Outstanding Achievement in Television - Sanjeev Bhaskar
- Outstanding Achievement in Art & Design - John Rocha
- Chivas Social Entrepreneur of the Year - Gopi Gopalakrishnan

=== 6th Awards ===
The following were recipients at the 6th Asian Awards which took place on 8 April 2016.

- Founder's Award - Mother Teresa
- Entrepreneur of the Year - Anil Agarwal (industrialist)
- Business Leader of the Year - Sri Prakash Lohia
- Outstanding Achievement in Science and Technology - Shuji Nakamura
- Outstanding Achievement in Cinema - Asif Kapadia
- Outstanding Achievement in Sports - Son Heung-min
- Outstanding Achievement in Music - Naughty Boy
- Outstanding Achievement in Television - Kunal Nayyar
- Outstanding Achievement in Art & Design - Osman Yousefzada
- Outstanding Contribution to the Community - Rami Ranger
- Chivas Social Entrepreneur of the Year - Vikram Patel

=== 7th Awards ===
The following were recipients at the 7th Asian Awards which took place on 5 May 2017.

- Business Leader of the Year - Ajaypal Singh Banga
- Outstanding Achievement in Sport - Ding Junhui
- Outstanding Achievement in Music - Adnan Sami
- Outstanding Achievement in Television - Krishnan Guru-Murthy
- Rising Star - Sunny Pawar
- Outstanding Achievement in Cinema - Om Puri
- Outstanding Achievement in Science and Technology - Demis Hassabis
- Outstanding Contribution to the Community - Sir Harpal Kumar
- Philanthropist of the Year - Dr. Jack Preger
- Social Entrepreneur of the Year - Nisha Dutt
- Entrepreneur of the Year - Masayoshi Son
- Fellowship Award - Sachin Tendulkar

=== 8th Awards ===
The following were recipients at the 8th Asian Awards which took place on 27 April 2018.

- Business Leader of the Year - Arundhati Bhattacharya
- Outstanding Achievement in Sport - Jahangir Khan
- Outstanding Achievement in Music - BTS
- Outstanding Achievement in Television - Anita Rani
- Rising Star - Bana al-Abed
- Outstanding Achievement in Cinema - Sridevi
- Outstanding Achievement in Science and Technology - Dame Pratibha Gai
- Philanthropists of the Year - Ramesh and Pratibha Sachdev
- Public Servant of the Year - Kiran Bajracharya
- Entrepreneur of the Year - Sunny Varkey

=== 9th Awards ===
The following were recipients at the 9th Asian Awards which took place on 12 April 2019.

- Business Leader of the Year - Anand Burman
- Outstanding Achievement in Sport - Mushtaq Ahmed (cricketer)
- Outstanding Achievement in Music - Nitin Sawhney
- Outstanding Achievement in Television - Nitin Ganatra
- Outstanding Achievement in the Arts - Alan Yau
- Rising Star - Rika
- Outstanding Achievement in Cinema - The cast of Crazy Rich Asians
- Outstanding Achievement in Science and Technology - Professor Jim Al-Khalili
- Philanthropist of the Year - Arjun Waney (Owner of Zuma, The Arts Club among others)
- Social Entrepreneur of the Year - Tawakkol Karman
- Outstanding Achievement Online - Jay Shetty
- Outstanding Contribution to the Community - Vichai Srivaddhanaprabha
- The Founders Award - The Martys of Jallianwala Bagh massacre
