= Richard Mackney =

British journalist and broadcaster

Richard Mackney is an English journalist and broadcaster, probably best known as a reporter on ITV breakfast show, GMTV.

== Background ==
Mackney was born in April 1971 in Emsworth, Hampshire. He was educated at De La Salle College in Jersey, St Boniface's College in Plymouth, and studied law at the University of Birmingham.

== Career ==
Richard Mackney began his broadcasting career in 1996 in Bristol as a video-journalist and presenter at 24-hour cable news station, Channel One Television, which was owned by Associated Newspapers. A year later he joined BBC South in Southampton as a reporter and presenter.

In 1998 he became a correspondent for ITV breakfast show, GMTV, specialising in the ‘lighter’ news stories of the day. He went freelance in 2000 and continued to make occasional appearances on GMTV as well as presenting Gagging For It, a comedy ‘gong’ show on ITV2, and a weekly movies show on Sky Movies.

Along with Claudia Winkleman and Keith Duffy, Mackney was a reporter on ITV1’s short-lived celebrity news show, Celebrity!, hosted by Andi Peters and Penny Smith, and in 2003 became the roving reporter on BBC Three’s live, weekly celebrity stock exchange show, Celebdaq, presented by Paddy O'Connell.

In 2004 he became an entertainment reporter for E! Entertainment, covering UK movie premieres and, in 2005, was a regular stand-in presenter on London’s LBC 97.3, filling in for Paul Ross and Iain Lee, among others.

He helped launch edfest.tv, an online TV channel covering the Edinburgh Festival, and, in 2008, co-presented a weekly, Saturday morning breakfast show on LBC.

In 2010 he appeared on Family Fortunes on ITV1 as part of Penny Smith’s team and, in 2011, provided the voice-over for Saturday morning BBC show, Dick and Dom's Funny Business.

Mackney now mainly works as a freelance writer and producer.

He is the co-author of 'Get A Life: His & Hers Survival Guide To IVF', published by Orion Publishing Group in 2015.
