= Paul Sagoo =

British entrepreneur

Paul Sagoo OBE
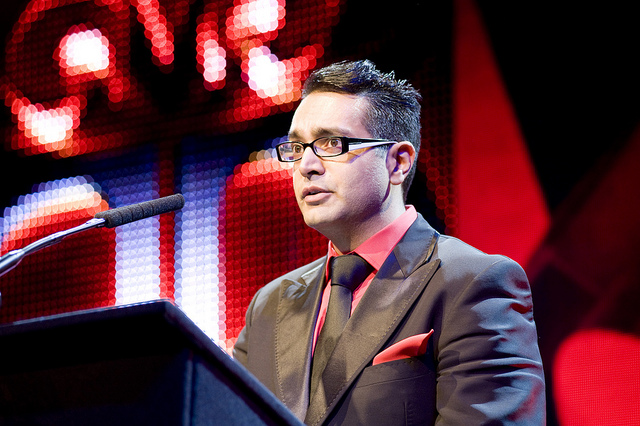
- Paul Sagoo OBE at The Asian Awards 2010
- Born: 21 November 1974 (age 51); London, England, UK
- Education: King's College London University of Law
- Occupations: Founder of The Asian Awards; CEO of Lemon Group
- Website: www.paulsagoo.com

Paul Sagoo OBE (born 21 November 1974) is a British entrepreneur of Sikh origin and the founder of The Asian Awards. He is best known for his work in creating the prestigious Asian Awards, which recognize and celebrate the achievements of Asians across various fields, including business, sport, entertainment, and public service.

== Early life ==
Sagoo was born on 21 November 1974 to a Sikh family in west London. He later attended King's College London, where he studied biomedical sciences.

== Career ==
In 2010, Sagoo founded The Asian Awards, which have since become an annual event celebrating the achievements of the global Asian community. The awards have honored many people including Sachin Tendulkar, Zayn Malik, Shah Rukh Khan, and Bruce Lee. Sagoo has also been involved in philanthropic work, partnering with Global Citizen at the Asian Awards.

In 2013, Sagoo was chosen as one of the original LinkedIn Influencers, alongside James Caan and Sir Richard Branson, sharing insights and thought leadership with a large audience on the platform.

Sagoo has remained an advocate for diversity and inclusion citing it as the main reason for creating The Asian Awards.

== Personal life ==
Sagoo was married to Kiran Sharma, Prince's former manager, but the couple later divorced in 2020.

== Honours ==
Paul Sagoo was awarded an OBE as part of the 2022 Birthday Honours in recognition of his contributions to the Asian community, diversity & inclusion and philanthropic work.
