= Sara Moore =

Sara Moore may refer to:

- Sara Moore (netball) (born 1982), Welsh netball player, coach, and administrator
- Sara Jane Moore (born 1930), American citizen who attempted to assassinate US President Gerald Ford
- Sara Moore, a character in the 2002 film Serving Sara

== See also ==
- Josiah B. and Sara Moore House
- Sarah Moore (disambiguation)
