= Him and Me =

British comedy duo

Him and Me are a British comedy duo who first found success with their YouTube videos.

The duo is made up of Shea Taylor and Steven Langstaff, they perform their comedy live as well as writing and performing sketches for TV, including the Super Granny Nanny sketches for "Dick and Dom's Funny Business" on BBC Two and sketches for Manchester-based Channel M.

Their most successful online video was a Lady Gaga spoof which reached over 2.5 million hits and they appear as regular guests on BBC Radio Manchester and Lancashire.

Shea Taylor is 27 and comes from Repton in Derbyshire and Steven Langstaff is 28 and originally comes from Hull. steven langstaff is now living in nantwich where he no longer produces comedy videos. It is rumoured that he now works in a secondary school.
