= Chris Steele (doctor) =

British television doctor

Chris Steele MBE
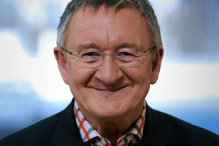
- Born: 29 August 1945 (age 80); Wallsend, Northumberland, (Note: Wallsend has been part of Tyne and Wear since 1974) England
- Occupation: Medical doctor
- Known for: This Morning (1988–2021)

Chris Steele MBE is a British retired medical doctor and broadcaster. He was the resident doctor on ITV's This Morning daytime magazine show, where he appeared weekly from when the show first aired in 1988 until retiring in 2021. Dr Steele's son, Andrew Steele, is an international athlete competing in the 400 m for Great Britain.

== Works ==
=== Work on nicotine addiction ===
Steele became interested in treating his patients who smoked in the early 1970s and is now recognised as an international expert in smoking cessation and nicotine addiction. He has lectured on this subject in over 27 countries around the world, making many media appearances.

=== Fight to have nicotine gum prescriptions paid by NHS ===
In 1984, he was faced with a dilemma regarding the prescribing of nicotine gum (Nicorette) for smokers who wanted help in giving up their cigarettes. At that time in the UK, nicotine gum was a prescription only medicine (POM). It was in fact the only POM amongst thousands that could not be prescribed at NHS expense; in other words, it was not reimbursable under the socialised medicine system that was in effect at that time in the UK.

A Department of Health committee, known as the Advisory Committee on Borderline Substances, recommended that Nicorette should not be allowed on NHS prescription, because it decreed that "Anti smoking preparations are not regarded as drugs." Dr Steele regarded that nicotine was most certainly a drug and a powerful one at that, and so prescribed nicotine gum on NHS prescriptions for those motivated smokers who wanted to give up smoking. As a result of "breaking the rules", Steele faced various disciplinary hearings, eventually having to present his case to a Tribunal of Independent Referees.

At that tribunal a statement for the Secretary of State for Health read as follows: "Smoking is a habit it is not a disease or condition even though It may be a contributary cause of, or may aggravate, a disease or condition such as bronchitis, carcinoma of the lung, arteriosclerosis and so on." The tribunal's conclusions to "Is tobacco dependency a disease?", dated 6 July 1984, which Steele's supporters regarded as a vindication, were as follows:

- "We find it ought to be so considered."
- "We find that nicotine prescribed for this purpose has both a pharmacological and a therapeutic effect."
- "We find that this method of treatment is the most effective that has so far been evolved."

== Honours ==
In April 2010, Steele was appointed an MBE in recognition of his services to the medical profession and broadcasting.
