= Dick and Dom's Funny Business =

Television series

- Presented by: Richard McCourt; Dominic Wood
- Starring: Kelly-Anne Lyons; Tony Way; Abandoman (duo); Him and Me
- Country of origin: United Kingdom
- No. of series: 1
- No. of episodes: 13

Production
- Production location: Teddington Studios
- Running time: 60 minutes

Original release
- Network: CBBC, BBC Two
- Release: 8 January – 2 April 2011

Dick and Dom's Funny Business is a British comedy television series for children, hosted by comic presenting duo Richard McCourt and Dominic Wood (Dick and Dom). The series was broadcast in a Saturday morning slot on BBC Two and simulcast on the CBBC Channel, and was Dick and Dom's return to Saturday mornings following the success of Dick & Dom in da Bungalow, which ended in Spring 2006. Unlike ...da Bungalow, which was largely broadcast live and ran for up to three hours with inserted content, ...Funny Business was a pre-recorded, self-contained one-hour programme. The first series began in January 2011 and ran for 13 episodes.

The format of the series was Dick and Dom hosting a comedy club-style event; external shots of the theatre which supposedly hosts the venue are seen as establishing shots during the programme. The theatre's American owner is not himself seen on screen, though his daughter Kelly-Anne Manhattan is part of the recurring cast (played by Kelly-Anne Lyons). The duo introduce a range of guest comedy acts who each perform an on-stage sketch/stand-up routine, and between these the viewer sees behind-the-scenes skits involving the duo, recurring characters and guests, and also interwoven into the show are a number of separate recorded skits and sketches featuring additional cast members and characters not featured in the main show.

The first series consisted of ten regular episodes and three clip shows featuring new links between previously-seen performances; the third clip show also featured some behind-the-scenes footage of guest performers from across the series.

== Recurring features and sketches ==
Stage performances
Each week's show features several sketches performed live before the studio audience by guest comic troupes which have during the series included the likes of Pappy's, The Three Englishmen and Idiots of Ants.

The Devastation Brothers
Two wrestlers in green lycra bodysuits (played by Steven Burge and Tony Way) send a video message in which they trash-talk Dick and Dom. There are also frequent fart jokes in this segment.

Usherettes
Two usherettes at the theatre (male actors in drag) gossip and bicker with one another.

The History of Funny Business
A short skit looking at a comedic or slapstick device, demonstrated by Dick and Dom (as the silent "Subject A" and "Subject B") with the aid of narrator, Richard Mackney.

The TV that switches itself on
Used as a means to introduce a selection of short independent sketches, generally unrelated to the main plot, into the programme. Recurring skits within this segment include:

- Super Granny Nanny, a parody of Supernanny in which a behaviour coach tries to control a wayward OAP; written and performed by "Him and Me"
- Cubs, in which a Cub Scout now in his 40s and the last remaining member of his troop, is given tasks to do
- BEAR, a series of TV parodies featuring soft toys, in a similar vein to those seen in The Adam and Joe Show

Finale
Each edition of ...Funny Business closes with a musical comedy sequence featuring improvisational comedy duo Abandoman, performing with Dick and Dom and the special guest. The duo invite the guest and the audience members to submit phrases to be included in their improvised performance. A running gag is that Kelly-Anne Manhattan asks to perform in this sequence and is usually given a minor or unusual instrument to close the performance with.

== Episode guide ==
No.	Title	Special guest	Original release date
1	"Whose Baby"	Stephen K. Amos	8 January 2011
Dick and Dom find a baby at the theatre, and inadvertently teach it its first word.
2	"The Rider"	Gordon Kennedy	15 January 2011
Dick and Dom find a list of demands which they believe is Gordon Kennedy's rider.
3	"Mouse in the House"	Warwick Davis	22 January 2011
The theatre suffers a rodent infestation.
4	"Bills, Bills, Bills"	Tracy-Ann Oberman	29 January 2011
Dick and Dom are struggling to pay the theatre's bills.
5	"Fitty Business"	Debra Stephenson	5 February 2011
Dick and Dom open a gym and spa at the theatre.
6	"Definitely Not Going Out"	Tim Vine	12 February 2011
Dick becomes obsessed with topping the league in a new computer game.
7	"Dixie and Dom"	Steve Furst	19 February 2011
In order to convince his grandmother that he is married, Dom persuades Dick to dress as a woman.
8	"In It to Win It"	Jessica Hynes	26 February 2011
Dick becomes obsessed with entering competitions.
9	"A Brave Face"	Catherine Tate	5 March 2011
Dick is offered a job working for the Queen.
10	"And the Winner Is..."	Jason Byrne	12 March 2011
Dick and Dom attempt to clean up the theatre's image ahead of the "Theatre of the Year" awards.
11	"The Estate Agent"	None (clip show)	19 March 2011
An estate agent attempts to sell the theatre, prompting Dick and Dom to reminisce.
12	"Total Recall"	None (clip show)	26 March 2011
Dom is hit with a fish and forgets how to put on a show.
13	"Behind the Scenes"	None (clip show)	2 April 2011
A film-maker has left his tapes for a documentary on Dick and Dom in the theatre.
