= This Morning (TV programme) =

British daytime TV programme (1988–present)

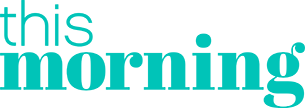
- Genre: Entertainment; Lifestyle
- Created by: Diane Nelmes
- Presented by: Richard Madeley; Judy Finnigan; Ross Kelly; Caron Keating; John Leslie; Fern Britton; Twiggy; Coleen Nolan; Phillip Schofield; Lorraine Kelly; Ruth Langsford; Eamonn Holmes; Holly Willoughby; Dermot O'Leary; Alison Hammond; Ben Shephard; Cat Deeley; Josie Gibson; Paddy McGuinness; Andi Peters
- Theme music composer: David Pringle
- Country of origin: United Kingdom
- Original language: English
- No. of series: 37

Production
- Executive producer: Emma Gormley
- Production locations: Royal Albert Dock, Liverpool (1988–1996); Studio 8, The London Studios (1996–2018); Studio TC3, Television Centre, London (2018–2025); The H Club Studio (2026–present)
- Editor: Vivek Sharma
- Running time: 150 minutes (including advertisements)
- Production companies: Granada Television (1988–2006); ITV Studios Daytime (2006–2025); Multistory Media (2026–present)

Original release
- Network: ITV
- Release: 3 October 1988 – present

This Morning is a British daytime magazine programme that is broadcast on ITV. It debuted on 3 October 1988 and is broadcast live every weekday from 10:00 am to 12:30 pm across the United Kingdom, and in the Republic of Ireland by Virgin Media One. The programme features a variety of news, showbiz, fashion, health and beauty, lifestyle, home and garden, food, technology, live phone-ins, and competitions.

The show was originally presented by husband and wife duo Richard Madeley and Judy Finnigan for more than a decade after its launch. It is currently presented by Ben Shephard and Cat Deeley from Monday to Thursday with Dermot O'Leary and Alison Hammond presenting on Fridays.

The daytime programme has aired on ITV for over 35 years, making it one of the longest-running daytime programmes on British television. It won the National Television Award for Best Daytime/Live Magazine Show for 12 years running, from 2011 to 2022.

== History ==
In 1988, ITV decided to create a live daytime morning programme and five regional ITV companies made pilot shows to bid for the national contract:

- Television South offered a show called Home Today, hosted by Andy Craig and Fern Britton.
- Thames Television
- Yorkshire Television
- Tyne Tees Television
- Granada Television offered a show called This Morning, and was awarded the national contract.

The first episode of This Morning aired at 10:40 am on 3 October 1988 and finished at 12:10 pm, live from the Granada studio inside the Albert Dock in Liverpool. An industry insider believed the idea would not work and would be pulled by Christmas 1988, but despite This Morning being launched with no publicity, its ratings quickly rose to a daily average of two million viewers.

In the first few series, the show's "experts" were weatherman Fred Talbot, agony aunt Denise Robertson, medic Dr Chris Steele, cook Susan Brookes, beauty presenter Liz Earle, hair and make-up artists Andrew and Liz Collinge, and wine expert Charles Metcalfe. The theme tune was by David Pringle, who also wrote opening music for Wheel of Fortune, Fun House and The Pyramid Game. To end the first series, in 1989, the show was presented via satellite from the United States at Disneyland in Anaheim, California. Produced by Granada's Field Producer, Brian Thomas, the set was built directly in front of 'Sleeping Beauty Castle', a first for Disney.

As part of the show, Talbot used a floating map of the British Isles to report the forecast. A clip of Mark Roberts, a prolific streaker, running onto Talbot's weather map in 1995 is regularly featured on clip shows.

On 2 September 1996, the show was moved to the London Studios on the grounds that it was difficult to get celebrity guests to travel from London to Liverpool.

The show proved newsworthy on several occasions. In 2001, This Morning covered new ground by showing a gay partnership celebration live, and a 2008 interview with Kerry Katona slurring her words also attracted coverage.

=== 2009–2015 ===
ITV relaunched This Morning in 2009 with a new set and with Holly Willoughby replacing Fern Britton as co-host, which saw ratings rise by 20%.

This Morning Cook In!, an interactive cook event, began on 1 March 2010. Each week, five viewers and a celebrity guest cooked along, via Skype, with Gino D'Acampo or Phil Vickery.

From 20 March 2010, This Morning increased from five to seven shows a week, with two new one-hour shows broadcast on the weekends, where Schofield and Willoughby presented pre-recorded links in between compilations of the week's programming. The weekend editions were later dropped from the schedule.

The "Hub" interactive segment was heavily featured from 2010 until 2014. Presenters included Jeff Brazier (2013–2014), Jenni Falconer (2013–2014), Stephen Mulhern (2011‍–‍2014), Rylan Clark (2013–2014), Emma Willis (2012–2014), Coleen Nolan (2010‍–‍2012), Samanthi Jayawardena (2010–2012) and Matt Johnson (2010‍–‍2013).

On 21 August 2013, Carol Vorderman took her first steps towards a 2014 World Record attempt by doing a solo flight to 1,000 metres high, live on This Morning. Reporter Jenni Falconer covered the occasion.

On 3 October 2013, This Morning celebrated its 25th anniversary. The programme was broadcast live from its original home at Albert Dock in Liverpool with presenters Phillip Schofield, Eamonn Holmes, Holly Willoughby, Alison Hammond and Ruth Langsford being joined by original presenters Richard Madeley and Judy Finnigan. Numerous historical clips of the show were aired, including Gene Pitney's miming gaffe from 1989. Keith Lemon presented the weather from the show's famous floating weather map, while Stephen Mulhern presented various items including 'The Hub Sub' (the 'Hub' on a submarine). There was speculation concerning whether Fern Britton would return for the 25th anniversary; however, it was confirmed eight days beforehand that she would not.

=== 2015–2018 ===
On 27 August 2015, This Morning broadcast the remaining weeks' shows from the South Bank due to the main studio having a revamp ready for the new series on 1 September. The new series had many changes, including a brand new set, theme music, titles and the new logo being painted onto the outside of the building.

In February 2017, it was announced that The London Studios, where This Morning is filmed, were planned to close for large-scale redevelopment in early 2018, and that This Morning would be relocated to Television Centre during construction. This move became permanent when ITV announced its intention to sell The London Studios in October 2018.

In July 2017, at the start of the summer series, new titles were made to match Langsford and Holmes presenting the show. The titles were different from the usual design, showing a behind-the-scenes look from the doors to the studio, make-up props and room, clothing department and the art gallery with a view of the studio at fast speed with crew in the presenters' place. The show was also retitled This Morning with Eamonn and Ruth. The regular series titles used since 2015 returned on 4 September, when Willoughby and Schofield returned to the show.

=== 2018–2026 ===
From 1 to 5 October 2018, This Morning celebrated 30 years on air. During the week, it broadcast a live wedding, a brief come-back of the classic weather map from Albert Dock (presented by Hammond), special opening titles, a new app, a live studio audience, a special 30 years bus (with correspondents Lisa Snowdon and Ore Oduba), as well as special games and guests. On 2 October, an ITV special aired, entitled This Morning: 30 Unforgettable Years. On 12 October, the show aired live coverage of the wedding of Princess Eugenie and Jack Brooksbank.

From 6 January 2020, the programme was extended by 30 minutes following a live handover from Lorraine, which saw the show start at the earlier time of 10:00 as part of changes to the ITV daytime schedule.

On 7 February 2020, Schofield came out as gay in an interview on This Morning, where he stated that "with the strength and support of my wife and my daughters, I have been coming to terms with the fact that I am gay".

In June 2022, amid the Platinum Jubilee of Elizabeth II, Schofield and Willoughby hosted an episode of This Morning at Buckingham Palace.

In October 2025, it was announced that Multistory Media would take over production of the series beginning in January 2026, as part of a plan to merge ITV Studios Daytime into the label.

=== 2026–present ===
On 5 January 2026, This Morning moved to The H Club Studio alongside its ITV Daytime counterparts. The programme relaunched with a new set, remixed theme tune, and updated titles and graphics.

== Presenters ==
From October 1988 to July 2001, This Morning was presented by husband and wife Richard Madeley and Judy Finnigan. During the tenth series, Caron Keating and Ross Kelly presided, and from series 11 in 1999 Fern Britton and John Leslie were regular presenters of the Friday show. Coleen Nolan and Twiggy replaced Madeley and Finnigan in 2001, with Britton and Leslie remaining on Fridays. Twiggy was later dismissed, whilst Nolan presented until the end of 2001 with Leslie, and was subsequently replaced by Britton.

Phillip Schofield joined the programme as a Friday presenter in September 2002. The following month, Leslie's contract on This Morning was terminated after television presenter Matthew Wright named him as the man who allegedly raped Ulrika Jonsson. Jonsson had written in her autobiography that "an acquaintance" had raped her when she was 19. Schofield then took over as a main presenter.

In 2003, Alison Hammond joined the This Morning team as a regular segment presenter and announcer. Lorraine Kelly presented with Schofield on Mondays and Fridays from September 2004, after Britton requested to spend more time with her family. In 2006, Ruth Langsford, who had been a stand-in presenter since 1999, and her husband Eamonn Holmes became permanent presenters on Fridays and main presenters during school holidays.

On 26 March 2009, Britton announced that she was to leave This Morning after ten years and would be replaced by Holly Willoughby on 14 September 2009. She presented her final show on 17 July 2009. In 2014 and 2015, Amanda Holden and Christine Lampard presented alongside Schofield when Willoughby was on maternity leave. Holden returned as a guest presenter in 2017.

In August 2013, Rochelle Humes and her husband Marvin joined This Morning as regular stand-in presenters and presented together until 2015. Humes returned in 2018 to present alongside Schofield when Willoughby was in Australia filming I'm a Celebrity...Get Me Out of Here!. Following this, she has returned as a guest presenter numerous times.

In 2018, Josie Gibson joined the This Morning team as a regular segment presenter and announcer. In November 2021, she guest presented three episodes of the show alongside Schofield.

In December 2020, it was announced that Holmes and Langsford were being replaced on Fridays by Dermot O'Leary and Alison Hammond, but would remain in their school holiday presenting slot. In December 2021, Holmes announced he was leaving This Morning and would be moving to GB News, with Langsford also announcing her departure from the show, although she returned to guest present a week of episodes in August 2022 alongside Rylan Clark.

In 2021, Craig Doyle joined the This Morning team as a regular segment presenter and announcer. In May 2022, he guest presented two episodes of the show alongside Hammond. Subsequently, Gibson and Doyle became regular stand-in presenters.

On 20 May 2023, Schofield agreed to step down from This Morning with immediate effect after more than 20 years following reports that his relationship with co-host Holly Willoughby had come under strain. Schofield said that he understood ITV had decided that "the current situation [could] not go on". Willoughby was later announced as head presenter, with O'Leary, Hammond, Gibson and Doyle as rotating presenters alongside Willoughby.

On 5 October 2023, Willoughby withdrew from the programme at short notice when a murder plot against her became known. She subsequently took leave from the show for an indefinite period. Five days later, Willoughby announced on Instagram that she had quit the show.

After Willoughby's departure left the show without a main host for the first time in over 35 years, a number of presenters were tried out on This Morning, including Steve Jones, Andi Peters, Ben Shephard, Rochelle Humes, Rylan Clark, Cat Deeley, Sarah Ferguson, Emma Willis, Christine Lampard, Mollie King, Lisa Snowdon and Siân Welby.

On 16 February 2024, Shephard and Deeley were announced as the show's new permanent presenters and they started presenting Monday–Thursday from 11 March.

=== Current on air team ===
Tenure	Person	Role
Main presenters
2024–present	Ben Shephard	Monday–Thursday
2024–present	Cat Deeley	Monday–Thursday
2021–present	Dermot O'Leary	Friday
2021–present	Alison Hammond	Friday
Stand-in presenters
2010–2011, 2024–present	Paddy McGuinness	Holiday Cover
2013–2016, 2023–present	Christine Lampard	Holiday Cover
2013–2019, 2022–present	Rylan Clark	Holiday Cover
2013–present	Rochelle Humes	Holiday Cover
2021–present	Andi Peters	Holiday Cover
2021–present	Josie Gibson	Holiday Cover
2022–present	Craig Doyle	Holiday Cover
2023–present	Joel Dommett	Holiday Cover
2025–present	Angela Scanlon	Holiday Cover
Segment presenters and experts
1996–2000, 2018–present	John Torode	Chef
2006–present	Phil Vickery	Chef
2012–present	Rustie Lee	Chef
2016–present	Juliet Sear	Chef
2018–present	Donal Skehan	Chef
2019–present	Clodagh McKenna	Chef
2019–present	Nisha Katona	Chef
2003–present	Sharon Marshall	Soap expert
2007–present	Martin Lewis	Financial expert
2014–present	Gok Wan	Fashion expert
2018–present	Lisa Snowdon	Fashion expert
2014–present	Alice Beer	Consumer expert
2015–present	Nik and Eva Speakman	Therapy and wellbeing experts
2016–present	Doctor Zoe	Health and wellbeing expert
2016–present	Deidre Sanders	Agony aunt
2016–present	Nick Ferrari	News reviewer
2024–present	Ashley James	News reviewer
2024–present	Sam Thompson	Roving reporter and announcer
2023–present	Siân Welby	Entertainment presenter (also Stand-in presenter)
2023-present	Chelsea Dickenson	Travel and Holiday expert

=== Former main presenters ===
Tenure	Person	Role
1988–2001	Richard Madeley	Monday–Thursday (1998–2001); Monday–Friday (1988–1998)
1988–2001	Judy Finnigan	Monday–Thursday (1998–2001); Monday–Friday (1988–1998)
1998	Ross Kelly	Friday
1998	Caron Keating	Friday
1999–2002	John Leslie	Monday–Thursday (2002); Monday–Friday (2001–2002); Friday (1999–2001)
1999–2009	Fern Britton	Monday–Thursday (2006–2009); Tuesday–Thursday (2004–2006); Monday–Friday (2002–2004); Friday (1999–2001)
2001	Twiggy	Monday–Thursday
2001	Coleen Nolan	Monday–Thursday
2002–2023	Phillip Schofield	Monday–Thursday (2006–2023); Monday–Friday (2002–2006); Friday (2002)
2004–2006	Lorraine Kelly	Monday & Friday
2006–2020	Ruth Langsford	Friday
2006–2020	Eamonn Holmes	Friday
2009–2023	Holly Willoughby	Monday–Thursday

=== Former segment presenters and experts ===
Tenure	Name	Role
1988–2021	Chris Steele	Health and wellbeing expert
1988–2016	Denise Robertson	Agony aunt
2003–2022	Alison Hammond	Roving reporter and announcer
2009	Simon Calder	Travel expert
2009–2025	Gino D'Acampo	Chef
2015–2021	Dr Ranj Singh	Medical expert
2015–2018	Bryony Blake	Beauty expert
2017-2024	Vanessa Feltz	Agony aunt
2024	Jordan North	Entertainment presenter

== Controversies ==
=== David Cameron interview ===
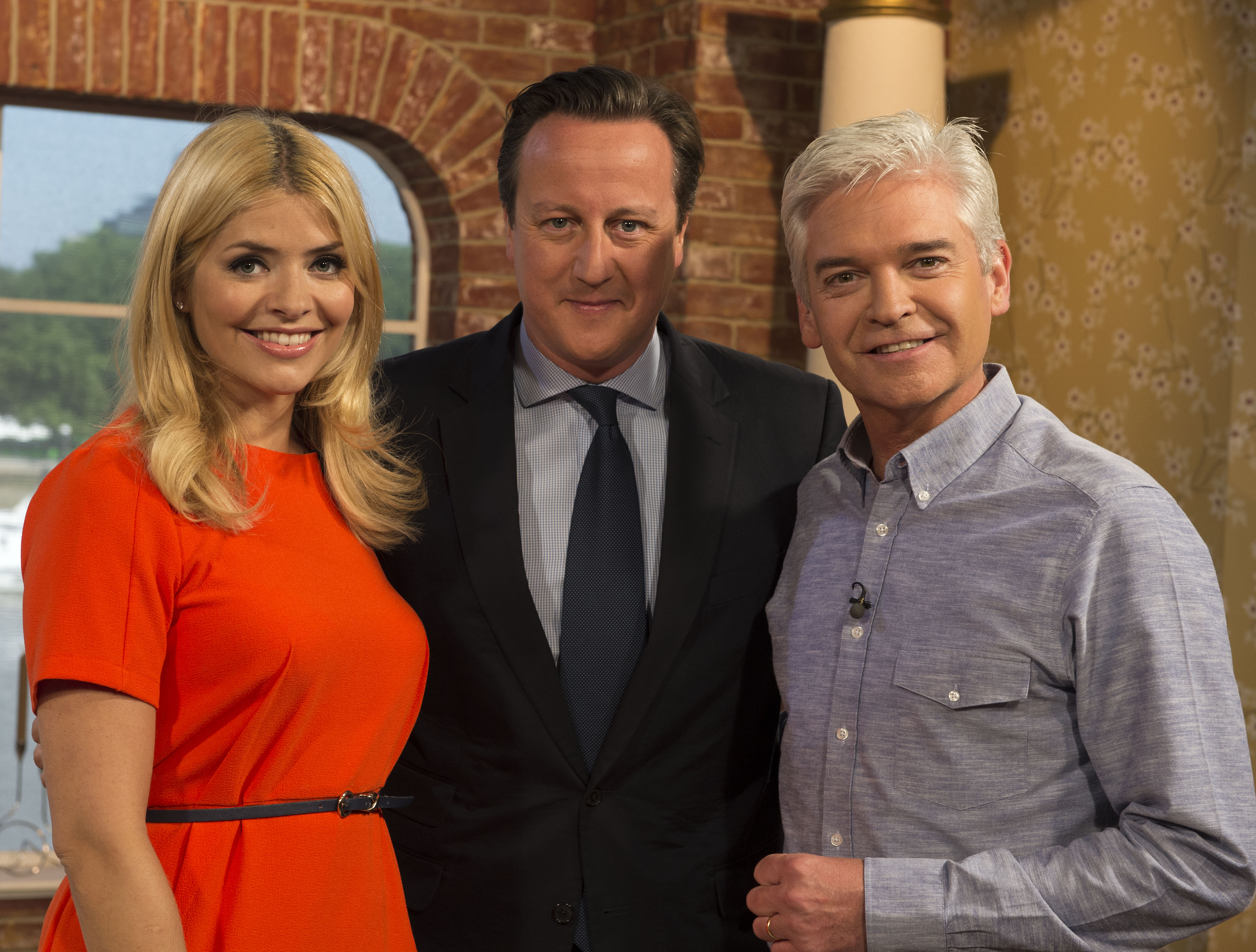
David Cameron on the set of This Morning with Phillip Schofield and Holly Willoughby

Amid the Jimmy Savile sexual abuse scandal on 8 November 2012, Phillip Schofield and Holly Willoughby interviewed then Prime Minister David Cameron. During the interview, Schofield presented Cameron with a list he had obtained from the internet of five people named as paedophiles in connection with the North Wales child abuse scandal. The names of several former senior Conservative politicians were visible on the list. Schofield was widely criticised for his action, with broadcaster Jonathan Dimbleby describing his behaviour as "cretinous".

Cameron responded by warning against a witch hunt, "particularly about people who are gay". ITV's director of television, Peter Fincham, said that Schofield was "wrong" in confronting Cameron and said that the broadcaster had agreed to co-operate fully with government regulator Ofcom's investigation into the matter. The investigation was initiated after Ofcom received 415 complaints from viewers. Schofield later apologised, blaming a misjudged camera angle. Schofield and ITV later paid £125,000 compensation to settle a libel suit from one of those falsely accused, Alistair McAlpine, Baron McAlpine of West Green.

=== Classism: 'It's a Toff Life' ===
In 2018, some viewers and commentators criticised a segment titled "It's A Toff Life". Producers set a series of challenges for former Made in Chelsea cast member Georgia Toffolo that included completing tasks required of staff in KFC and a sewage works. Some viewers deemed the segment "pathetically patronising" to watch Toffolo "slum it like ordinary folk for the day" and said the show was "patronising working-class people."

=== Boris Johnson selfie ===
In December 2019, during the 2019 general election campaign, Schofield and Willoughby were criticised by some viewers for a "giggly" interview with then Prime Minister Boris Johnson. The co-hosts' decision to take a selfie with Johnson was also criticised by some viewers who raised a "lack of professionalism" and "clear bias". Schofield defended the selfie, writing: "Can I point out that if Mr Corbyn had asked for a selfie, we would have happily obliged." Viewers argued that the pair had been more critical when interviewing Jeremy Corbyn, who faced repeated calls to apologise for accusations of antisemitism in the Labour Party. Some viewers noted that Islamophobia in the Conservative Party was not raised with Johnson. Ofcom received 149 complaints.

=== "Spin to Win" Energy bills prize ===
On 5 September 2022, This Morning included a new prize of "energy bills" in their regular "spin to win" game. The prize equated to four months of payments, up to £400 each month. When a contestant failed to provide the qualifying passcode on air This Morning ended the phone call, prompting Willoughby to say, "Well, we're not going to make Joyce's dreams come true." Schofield replied, "Well it's her fault." Schofield asked the first qualifying contestant if they were "worried" about energy bills and the contestant replied that "it's absolutely murder" having a prepayment meter. The inclusion of bill payments was compared to Black Mirror or The Hunger Games. Coverage from Sky News asked "Is Russia using Phillip Schofield for propaganda?" after the game was reported on Russian state television. British politician Mary Kelly Foy tweeted:

I'm disgusted that @thismorning have used people being unable to afford their energy bills as some kind of twisted gameshow. The producers need to rethink this immediately! Everyone deserves dignity, especially if they're struggling.

On 6 September 2022, Schofield referenced the controversy by saying, "I wonder how much of that they can complain about online." Ofcom received 170 complaints about the segment and it prompted widespread criticism from viewers and commentators. Ofcom's broadcasting code states that: "We would strongly advise broadcasters not to present a monetary prize as a possible resolution of financial difficulty." On 7 September 2022, the prize was removed without comment from ITV.

=== "Queuegate" controversy ===
On 17 September 2022, Schofield and Willoughby drew criticism for not joining The Queue with the public, when filming for This Morning at the lying in state of Queen Elizabeth II in Westminster Hall. In a statement, ITV said that the pair was escorted from the press gallery by government staff and did not file past the Queen's coffin. Social media users contrasted this with the actions of former prime minister Theresa May and other celebrities including David Beckham, Susanna Reid and Tim Vine, all of whom queued for many hours with members of the general public. Online petitions were also organised calling for the pair to be sacked.

=== Phillip Schofield's affair and resignation from ITV ===
Following months of speculation about his private life, and widespread reports of a feud with Willoughby, Schofield presented This Morning for the last time on 18 May 2023, after more than 20 years in the role. Two days later, he announced his departure from the programme with immediate effect, saying: "ITV has decided the current situation can't go on, and I want to do what I can to protect the show that I love." In the first broadcast after his exit, Hammond and O'Leary praised Schofield as "one of the best live television broadcasters this country has ever had". A broadcasting executive subsequently told The Times that Willoughby had given ITV an ultimatum that either she or Schofield had to leave the programme.

In a statement to the Daily Mail on 26 May, Schofield admitted that, before leaving his wife in 2020, he had carried on an extramarital affair with a younger male ITV co-worker. He had first met the co-worker while giving a talk at the drama school where the latter was then a 15-year-old student. Schofield later arranged a job interview for the co-worker at This Morning, where he was hired as a production assistant. Schofield stated that the affair had begun when the co-worker was 20 years old, at which point Schofield was in his mid-50s, and admitted lying about it to ITV's management, his colleagues, his lawyers, his agent and his friends and family. He resigned from ITV and apologised for his lies, while calling the relationship "consensual" and "unwise but not illegal."

ITV said it had investigated rumours of a relationship between Schofield and the co-worker in early 2020, but that both men had repeatedly denied the affair. News of Schofield's affair and departure from ITV received extensive coverage in the British media. Elton John said that "If it was a straight guy in a fling with a young woman, it wouldn't even make the papers" while Jeremy Clarkson said "It seems to me he is only guilty of being what he said he was: gay." Piers Morgan also supported Schofield, saying it was time for the media to stop "relentless persecution" of Schofield.

Following his resignation, he gave separate interviews to BBC's Amol Rajan and The Sun in June 2023, in which he apologised to the co-worker for bringing the "greatest misery into his totally innocent life." He denied grooming the man, and said that he had lied not to protect his own career but to preserve the co-worker's privacy. He said that the two had never been in a "love affair" and were still friends. He said his career was over; said he had "lost everything" and felt "utterly broken", embarrassed and ashamed; and claimed that if not for his daughters Ruby and Molly guarding him, he would have attempted suicide. Although he acknowledged the age difference, Schofield said he believed homophobia was a factor in the media coverage, suggesting that an affair with a woman would not have created such a scandal.

Willoughby, who had previously said she was hurt that Schofield had lied to her when she asked about the rumours, returned to This Morning on 5 June for the first time since his departure. Stating that she felt "shaken, troubled and let down," she said that everyone at the programme had given "love and support to someone who was not telling the truth." She expressed concern for Schofield's mental health, thanked viewers for their kindness and support, and said "what unites us all now is a desire to heal."

Stating that it was "deeply disappointed by the admissions of deceit" made by Schofield, ITV severed ties with him, and instructed a King's Counsel to carry out an external review of its handling of the incident. ITV confirmed that This Morning would continue without Schofield, and announced that Jane McDonald would replace him as host of The British Soap Awards. The talent agency YMU dropped Schofield after representing him for 35 years, and the Prince's Trust announced that it would no longer feature him as an ambassador, saying it was "no longer appropriate to work together." When in Rome stopped selling the Phillip Schofield brand wines on its own website after revelations emerged about Schofield's affair, saying "this collaboration has drawn to a natural conclusion".

As a result of the controversy, ITV in October 2023 began requiring all workers at the network – including staff, consultants, contractors, freelancers, apprentices, and individuals on work experience – to disclose all personal relationships with colleagues. The policy applies to co-workers in romantic or sexual relationships, but also to those who are friends or relatives, who live in the same household, or who share other close connections. Failure to comply with the policy can result in disciplinary action, including termination of employment.

=== Alleged toxic culture ===
Schofield wrote in his memoir that in 2009, co-presenter Fern Britton accused him of meddling in the show and left because of this. Since the departure of Schofield, several people involved in the show have alleged a toxic culture operated. Ruth Langsford made a complaint to ITV while she worked there. Eamonn Holmes stated Schofield was "a narcissist and a bully at the centre of the toxicity." Media personality and singer Kerry Katona described it as "fake" and her interview (as a guest) by Schofield and Willoughby "belittling". Television personality Kim Woodburn, who appeared on the show after leaving the Celebrity Big Brother house, branded Schofield and Willoughby "phoney" and "two-faced" on the show.

Dr Ranj Singh said that in 2023, he had made an official complaint of a toxic culture and had been managed out. ITV confirmed that an external adviser carried out an investigation in 2021. Nadine Dorries, a former Culture Secretary, questioned the culture and working practices of the show. Questions over safeguarding and complaint handling by ITV were raised generally, and on 14 June 2023, ITV's chief executive Carolyn McCall answered to MPs on the Culture, Media and Sport Committee.

Loose Women panellist Carol McGiffin said This Morning was "tainted", and her colleagues did not like the show or Schofield's handover to them. A former production staff member also criticised the working culture which led to her resignation.

Schofield, Hammond and O'Leary all denied allegations of a toxic culture.

=== Cat Deeley's seizure comments ===
On 17 June 2024, presenter Cat Deeley caused controversy when she made comments about seizures and was accused of "mocking" people who have had seizures. After returning from an ad break, Deeley was seen dancing and shimmying to Meghan Trainor's "All About That Bass", prompting co-presenter Ben Shephard to laugh at her. She then declared: "Nothing to see here. Yeah, I'm fine, just having a seizure." Deeley's comments caused charity the Epilepsy Society to react with the following social media post: "Seizures are no laughing matter for people with #epilepsy @catdeeley. Please do better and educated yourselves about this difficult and poorly understood condition, @thismorning." The following day, Deeley apologised for her comments on air, stating, "I just wanted to apologise to anyone who was offended yesterday when I made a light-hearted comment about my dancing style. It really wasn't supposed to cause any upset to anybody. But I can see why that might have been the case. So I do apologise and am very sorry for the upset."

== Ratings ==
As of 2024, the show typically receives 486,000 viewers daily. On 3 October 2018, the show had one of its highest ratings, when 2.7 million viewers tuned in for its 30th anniversary.

== Studio ==
The 2015 exterior design of former studio coinciding with the programme's revamp.

From 2 September 1996 to April 2018, This Morning left the Albert Dock, Liverpool and broadcast live from Studio 8 at The London Studios on the South Bank, which features large picture windows looking out over the River Thames. Coinciding with the programme's revamp, the outside of the studio was repainted with the new This Morning logo and branding.

From 16 April 2018 to 25 December 2025, This Morning had been broadcast from Studio 3 of the newly renovated Television Centre run by BBC Studioworks, along with the rest of ITV Daytime, including Loose Women, Lorraine and Good Morning Britain.

It was planned to move back to the studios in 2023, but in October 2018, ITV announced it was looking to sell the site and would continue with the current studios and offices longer term. In November 2019, the London studio of This Morning was sold to Mitsubishi Estate.

From 2018 to 2025, Television Centre, run by BBC Studioworks, had been the home of ITV Daytime, but from 5 January 2026 with ITV looking to cut costs, it was announced that This Morning and the rest of ITV Daytime would now be broadcast from The H Club Studio in Covent Garden, while Good Morning Britain would move to the ITN headquarters in Central London. The changes saw 220 jobs lost as part of the cost-cutting measures.

== Awards ==
This Morning won the National Television Award for Best Daytime/Live Magazine Show for 12 years running, from 2011 to 2022. The show lost in the nominations in 2023 to The Repair Shop.

Year	Group	Award	Result
1997	National Television Awards	Most Popular Daytime Show	Nominated
1998	National Television Awards	Most Popular Daytime Show	Won
1999	National Television Awards	Most Popular Daytime Show	Won
2000	National Television Awards	Most Popular Daytime Show	Won
2001	National Television Awards	Most Popular Daytime Show	Won
2003	TV Quick Awards	Best Daytime Viewing	Won
2004	TV Quick Awards	Best Daytime Viewing	Won
2004	National Television Awards	Most Popular Daytime Show	Won
2005	National Television Awards	Most Popular Daytime Show	Nominated
2006	National Television Awards	Most Popular Daytime Show	Nominated
2007	National Television Awards	Most Popular Factual Programme	Nominated
2008	National Television Awards	Most Popular Factual Programme	Nominated
2010	TV Times Awards	Favourite Daytime Programme	Won
2011	TV Times Awards	Favourite Daytime Programme	Won
2011	National Television Awards	Best Topical Magazine Programme	Won
2011	Craft BAFTA	Digital Creativity	Nominated
2012	National Television Awards	Most Popular Factual Programme	Won
2012	TRIC Awards	Best TV Daytime Programme	Won
2012	Freesat Awards	Best Live Programme	Won
2012	BAFTA Craft Awards	Best Interactive Programme	Nominated
2013	National Television Awards	Most Popular Daytime Programme	Won
2013	TRIC Awards	Best TV Daytime Programme	Won
2014	National Television Awards	Most Popular Daytime Programme	Won
2014	TRIC Awards	Best TV Daytime Programme	Won
2014	Transgender Awards	Best Daytime Programme	Won
2015	National Television Awards	Most Popular Daytime Programme	Won
2015	Transgender Awards	Best Daytime Programme	Won
2016	National Television Awards	Best Live Magazine Show	Won
2016	TV Choice Awards	Best Daytime Show	Won
2016	Royal Television Society	Daytime Programme	Nominated
2016	Transgender Awards	Best Programme	Won
2017	National Television Awards	Best Live Magazine Show	Won
2017	TRIC Awards	Daytime Programme	Won
2017	Diversity in Media Awards	TV Moment of the Year	Nominated
2017	TV Choice Awards	Best Daytime Show	Won
2018	National Television Awards	Best Live Magazine Show	Won
2018	TRIC Awards	Daytime Programme	Won
2018	TV Choice Awards	Best Daytime Show	Won
2019	National Television Awards	Daytime Programme	Won
2019	TV Choice Awards	Best Daytime Show	Won
2020	National Television Awards	Most Popular Live Magazine Show	Won
2020	TV Choice Awards	Best Daytime Show	Won
2021	TV Choice Awards	Best Daytime Show	Won
2021	National Television Awards	Daytime Programme	Won
2022	National Television Awards	Daytime Programme	Won
2022	TV Choice Awards	Best Daytime Show	Nominated
2023	TRIC Awards	Daytime Programme	Nominated
2023	National Television Awards	Daytime Programme	Nominated
2024	TV Choice Awards	Best Daytime Show	Nominated
2024	National Television Awards	Daytime Programme	Nominated
2025	National Television Awards	Daytime Programme	Won
2026	National Television Awards	Daytime Programme	Won
