= Angels Costumes =

Supplier of costumes in England

Morris Angel & Son Limited
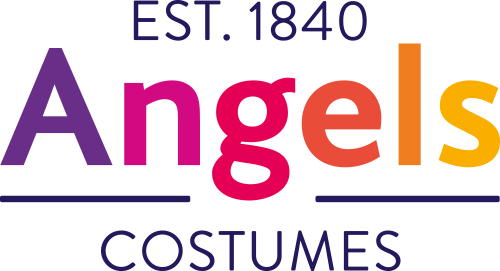
- Industry: Fancy dress, costume industry, film
- Founded: 1840
- Founder: Morris Angel
- Headquarters: 1 Garrick Road, London NW9 6AA, London, United Kingdom
- Key people: Tim Angel (CEO)
- Revenue: £11M (2014)
- Number of employees: 120 (2016)
- Parent: John Gore Studios
- Website: www.angels.uk.com

Angels Costumes (previously Angels and Bermans) is a supplier of costumes based in London, England to the film, theatre and television industries, as well as to the general public. The company, founded in 1840, is the longest-established costume supplier in the world, and has supplied costumes to 37 films that have received the Academy Award for Best Costume Design, including the 2010 film Alice in Wonderland and, most recently, The Grand Budapest Hotel.

Since its founding the company has stayed in family ownership for six consecutive generations, and is currently run by Chairman Tim Angel, CBE (former chairman, BAFTA; former governor, BFI) and his three children, Emma (director of fancy dress), Daniel (head of costume) and Jeremy (creative director).

== Early years ==
Morris Angel started his business in 1840 in the Seven Dials area of London, near Covent Garden, selling second-hand clothing and tailors' samples from Savile Row. Morris Angel's shop became popular with theatrical actors, who at that time had to purchase their own clothes and costumes for auditions and performances. It was a request from actors to hire rather than buy outfits for the duration of a performance that began the business model that remains in use by the company today.

Morris Angel brought his son Daniel into the business in 1870, and seven years later, the family opened a shop at 119 Shaftesbury Avenue which still houses Angels Fancy Dress nearly 150 years later.

== Cinema and the Oscars ==
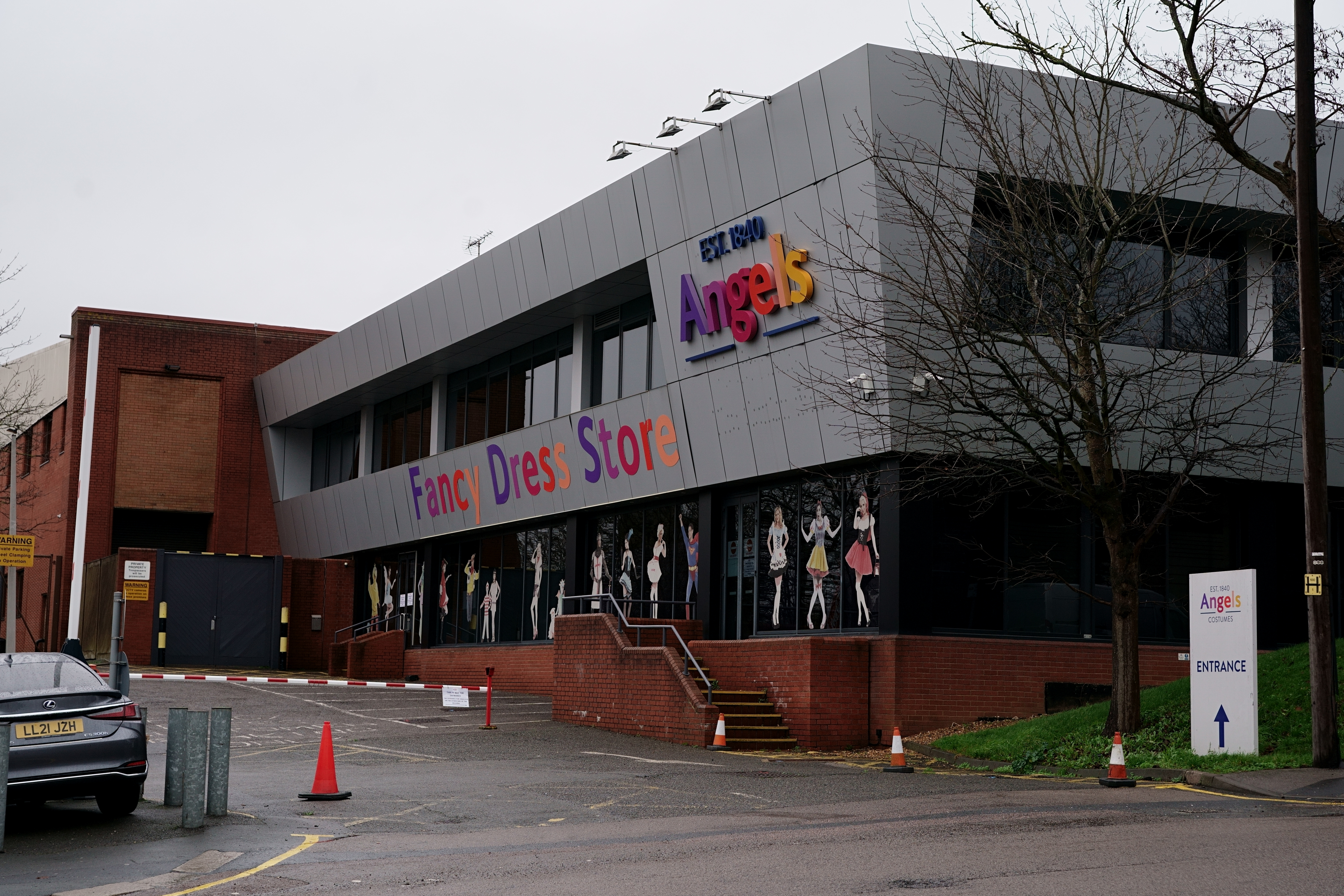
Premises on Garrick Road, London

With the advent of cinema, the Angel family made its second major diversification by supplying costumes to the new movie industry. Angels supplied its first Academy Award-winning costumes to Laurence Olivier's Hamlet in 1948. To date, 37 Best Costume Oscars have followed for work that the company has undertaken on major international films, including Star Wars, Titanic, Lawrence Of Arabia, The Great Gatsby, The Aviator, Memoirs of a Geisha and Marie Antoinette.

Angels acquired Bermans & Nathans in 1992, moving the professional hire for film, TV and theatre to Camden.

In 2015, Angels provided costumes to four of the five films nominated in this category: Mr. Turner, Into the Woods, Maleficent and The Grand Budapest Hotel, which won the Academy Award for Best Costume Design that year.

== Twenty-first century ==
The business currently has two divisions: Angels The Costumiers, based in North London, which supplies costumes to the entertainment industry, and Angels Fancy Dress, suppliers of fancy dress to the general public.

The Angels warehouse in Hendon, north London, where the majority of their costume collection is stored, houses an estimated five million items on approximately eight miles of rails. Angels now runs public tours twice a month.

In 2015 Angels celebrated its 175-year anniversary, and to mark the milestone decided to hold an exhibition showing some of the company's most famous costume creations. Dressed by Angels, held at the Old Truman Brewery in London from October to November 2015, allowed the public to view more than 100 iconic costumes from the worlds of film, TV, and theatre. As a companion to the exhibition, Angels also brought out a book, Behind the Seams, which offers readers further insight into the workings of the company.

In 2016, Angels won the BAFTA for Outstanding British Contribution to Cinema.

In 2020 Angel's fancy dress shop on Shaftesbury Avenue closed due to rent rises.

In April 2026, Angels was acquired by John Gore Studios.

== Trivia ==
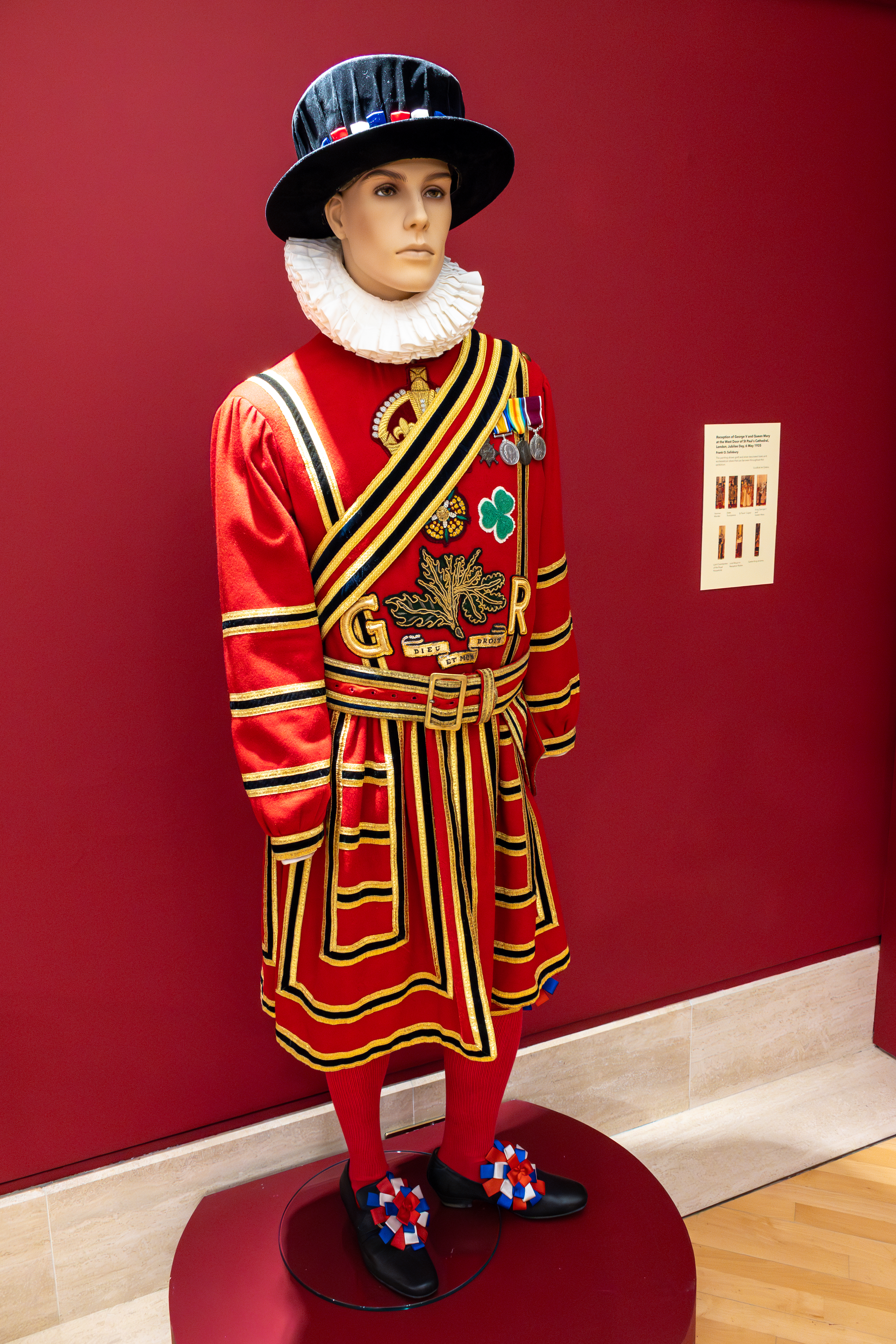
Replica Yeomen of the Guard state dress created by Angels Costumes

In September 2005, the original cloak worn by Alec Guinness as Obi-Wan Kenobi in George Lucas's Star Wars film was rediscovered hanging on the rails at Angels. Having been unwittingly available to the general public for some time as a monk's robe as well as being used as a crowd-scene costume in films including The Mummy, the provenance of the piece was confirmed by John Mollo, who created the item for the film in 1977, and received an Oscar for his efforts.

The Obi-Wan Kenobi cloak was auctioned by Bonhams in London on 6 March 2007 for £55,000. It formed part of a sale of 400 lots from the Angels archive – alongside costumes from James Bond, Doctor Who, and Highlander, as well as items worn onscreen by Ava Gardner, Errol Flynn and David Niven.

In the late 1980s, fashion designer Alexander McQueen worked at Angels as a costumier, and Daniella Helayel of London fashion company uses costumes held at Angels for inspiration.

Until 1966 Angels was also the tailor to the military and diplomatic services, and now houses a collection of military and civilian uniforms.
