= ITV Daytime =

British television programming block

- Network: ITV
- Country of origin: United Kingdom
- Owner: ITV plc
- Format: Strip programming
- Running time: Mondays–Fridays; 6:00am–6:00pm
- Original language: English

ITV Daytime is a British programming block on ITV, programmed by ITV plc. The block of programming begins at 6:00 am from Monday to Friday, and includes the ITV News programme Good Morning Britain.

== Current programming (as of January 2026) ==
Programmes
Programme	Since	Monday to Friday	Saturday	Sunday
Good Morning Britain	2014	06:00–09:30		
Lorraine	2010	09:30–10:00		
This Morning	1988	10:00–12:30		
Loose Women	1999	12:30–13:30		
ITV Lunchtime News	1972	13:30–13:55	Varied times	Varied times
Dickinson's Real Deal	2006	14:00–15:00		
This is Money	2026	15:00–16:00		
Deal or No Deal	2023	16:00–17:00	Varied times	Varied times
The Chase	2009	17:00–18:00	Varied times	Varied times
Saturday Morning with James Martin	2017		09:30–12:00	
Love Your Weekend with Alan Titchmarsh	2020		06:25–08:20	09:25–11:25
Jason Atherton Dubai Dishes	2023		11:35–12:35	11:50–12:50
Ainsley's Good Mood Food	2021		12:35–13:05	12:50–13:20
