= Claudia Sermbezis =

English actress and writer

Claudia Sermbezis is an English actress, best known for playing Lema Eelyak in Star Wars: The Force Awakens. She is also a writer and a broadcast journalist and television presenter specialising in news and wildlife for the BBC.

== Early life ==
Claudia Asimina Sermbezis was born in Kent, to a Greek father and an English mother.

== Career ==
Claudia Sermbezis plays Lema Eelyak in Star Wars: The Force Awakens. When she says, "General, the shields are down!" it is an echo of the line said by Admiral Ackbar in Star Wars: Episode VI – Return of the Jedi, "The shield is down! Commence attack on the Death Star's main reactor!"

Sermbezis has also worked with a number of high-profile British comedians and writers, including Ricky Gervais and Stephen Merchant in the Extras Christmas Special. Sermbezis played David Tennant's assistant in the Doctor Who spoof.

Sermbezis was Rob Brydon's agent in Rob Brydon's Annually Retentive for the BBC and Dr Judith MacIntosh in Channel 5's A-Z of Sexual Fetishes - a mockumentary produced by Rob Brydon's production company, Jones the Film. She also wrote and performed in the Jones the Film comedy Being Beautiful.

In 2002, Sermbezis made her debut in London's West End at the Theatre Royal Haymarket as a member of the Sir Peter Hall Company, acting alongside Vanessa Redgrave, Joely Richardson, Jack Davenport and Googie Withers. In 2006, she spent four months as a guest artist at the Royal Dramatic Theatre, in a new play about Sven-Göran Eriksson.

Sermbezis began her journalism career at the age of 17 when she work shadowed Anna Ford on the BBC's Six O'Clock News. She went on to become the nation's youngest national newsreader when she began reading Saturday morning bulletins for GMTV at 25. From 2006 to 2008, she was GMTV's weekend news presenter on The Sunday Programme.

Sermbezis also freelances as a journalist writing, reporting and presenting for the BBC. She specialises in wildlife journalism and broke the international story about the end of the dancing bear trade in India. Sermbezis subsequently wrote, produced and presented Saving India's Dancing Bears, her half-hour documentary which the BBC broadcast nationwide on Christmas Day and New Year's Eve 2009. In 2010, Sermbezis produced and presented a series of reports about loggerhead sea turtles in Zakynthos. She is a reporter and newsreader for BBC South East Today.

== Credits ==
Ben Affleck thanks her in the credits of his 2007 directorial debut Gone Baby Gone.

== Awards ==
In January 2009, Sermbezis was nominated for a Royal Television Society award.

Sermbezis won Kent Press & Broadcast Presenter of the Year 2025 & 2024

And Kent Press & Broadcast Feature Journalist of the Year 2020.

== Trivia ==
Sermbezis became the UK's youngest ever national news presenter when she began reading Saturday morning bulletins for GMTV at 25.

In February 2006, Press Gazette named Sermbezis as one of the country's most eligible journalists.
