= Zarin Patel =

British accountant and company executive

Zarin Patel is a British accountant and company executive who was the BBC's Chief Financial Officer from 2004, following the promotion of John Smith to chief operating officer, until 2013.

Since 2014, Patel has been CFO of Grass Roots, an employment services company.

== Biography ==
She graduated from the London School of Economics in 1982. She joined KPMG after graduation, and worked there for the majority of her career before moving to the BBC. She joined BBC in 1998 as Group Financial Controller. She was then promoted to head of Revenue Management, the department within the BBC responsible for collecting the Television licence, a job she had held since 2001.

In 2010 Patel was named Public Servant of the Year at The Asian Awards.
