= Edward Baran =

British newsreader and reporter

Edward Baran is a British newsreader and reporter. He worked for ITV Tyne Tees from 2007 to 2008, as a newsreader on weekend editions of North East Tonight, sharing the role with reporters at the station. Since late 2008, he can be seen reporting for GMTV in London.

== Education ==
Edward Baran attended Leeds Grammar School and read law at Durham University (University College), after which he gained a Postgraduate Diploma in Broadcast Journalism from City, University of London.
