= Lorraine (TV programme) =

British entertainment TV programme (2010–)

- Genre: Breakfast television programme
- Presented by: Lorraine Kelly
- Theme music composer: Sitting Duck
- Country of origin: United Kingdom
- Original language: English

Production
- Production locations: Studio 3, The London Studios (2010–2018); Studio TC2, Television Centre (2018–2025); The H Club Studio (2026–)
- Editor: Victoria Kennedy
- Running time: 55 minutes (2010–2020); 60 minutes (2020–2025); 35 minutes (2026–) (inc. adverts)
- Production companies: ITV Studios Daytime (2010–2025); Multistory Media (2026–)

Original release
- Network: ITV
- Release: 6 September 2010 – present

Related
- GMTV with Lorraine; Good Morning Britain

Lorraine is a British breakfast television programme that is broadcast on ITV. Launched on 6 September 2010, it is presented by Lorraine Kelly and broadcasts live every weekday from 9:30 a.m. to 10:00 a.m. The programme features a variety of showbiz, fashion, health, food, celebrity interviews and competitions.

== Format ==
Each day the presenter gives an introduction into what is coming up on the show, before discussing the main stories from the morning's newspapers, although sometimes this is replaced by a Los Angeles update from Ross King. The show's first guests tend to be interviewed next. Throughout the show more guests are interviewed as well as regulars such as Mark Heyes and Dr. Hilary Jones appear with fashion and health slots, respectively. The competition that runs on Good Morning Britain also appears throughout the show.

According to Attitude, Lorraine has "provided a platform for LGBT people to share their stories" and it earned Kelly the "Honourary [sic] Gay Award" at the 2015 Attitude Awards. The magazine described Lorraine as "one of the campest things on telly". Kelly described the series as "quite gay every day".

== History ==
On 6 September 2010, the first edition of the programme aired. A preview on Daybreak revealed the new studio look as spacious and coloured in a variety of pastel hues and decorative motifs dominated by pink. The sofa for the presenter and guests was pink and arranged in a semicircle around a central internally lit coffee table similar to that used for Daybreak. Lorraine's first guest was actress Gemma Arterton. The first programme also featured an interview with Sky News reporter Sarah Parish and a recipe by TV chef James Tanner while Celia Walden and Kevin Maguire reviewed the morning's newspapers.

On 20 October 2014, the programme was briefly taken off air after a fire alarm forced its occupants to evacuate the studio on London's South Bank. Kelly was about to interview eliminated X Factor contestant Stephanie Nala from Luminites when they were interrupted by the alarm at 9:10 am. A spokeswoman for Lorraine said: "An alarm was raised within ITV this morning and the area was immediately evacuated. Once it had been investigated and deemed safe, people were able to re-enter the building." Lorraine Kelly wrote to fans on Twitter: "So sorry. We had to evacuate the building. First time in 30 years!" The show didn't make it back onto the air and the last 15 minutes was replaced by an episode of The National Trust and then followed by The Jeremy Kyle Show as normal.

In February 2016, Lorraine's Top Tales was launched, a competition to find new children's author with Nadiya Hussain and Tom Fletcher as judges.

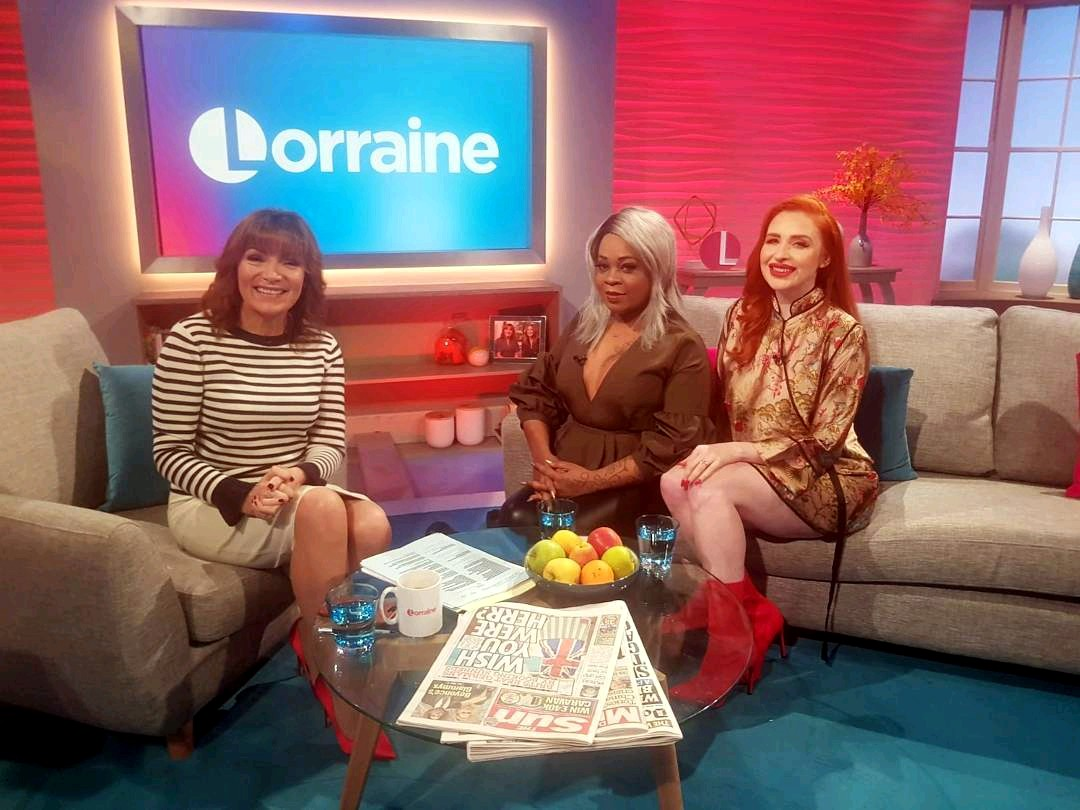
Photo of host Kelly with guests on the set of Lorraine in 2018

In April 2018, and along with the rest of ITV Breakfast, Lorraine began broadcasting from BBC Studioworks' Television Centre. The move was as a result of the proposed redevelopment of The London Studios; however in October 2018, it was announced that ITV would not be returning to the South Bank.

On 6 January 2020, the show moved to a new time slot from 9:00 am to 10:00 am, with Good Morning Britain and This Morning both extended by 30 minutes.

Production on Lorraine was suspended from 23 March to 10 July 2020 due to the COVID-19 pandemic. Good Morning Britain was extended to 10 am, with the final hour presented by Kelly and titled Good Morning Britain with Lorraine. During this time, the programme's run-time crossed the 9:25 a.m. ending of the official ITV Breakfast slot (6:00–9:25 a.m.), which is wholly owned by ITV plc. This is why viewers in most of Scotland would see ITV1 branding surrounding the first 25 minutes of the show, and STV branding for the remainder of the time slot.

In May 2025, ITV announced major budget cuts to its daytime lineup, with Lorraine transitioning to a 30-week school-term schedule, and being cut to a half-hour program beginning in January 2026. A half-hour extension of Good Morning Britain will air in place of Lorraine when it is not on the air. In October, it was announced that Multistory Media would take over production of the series at the same time, following the merger of ITV Studios Daytime into the label. The final broadcast from Television Centre was on 25 December 2025.

On 5 January 2026, Lorraine moved to The H Club Studio alongside its ITV Daytime counterparts. The programme relaunched with a new set and updated titles and graphics, with the remaining of the music from before.

== Presenters ==
Although Lorraine Kelly is the show's presenter, she is frequently absent from the show. Both Christine Lampard and Ranvir Singh act as relief presenters during her absences.

Presenters Gallery

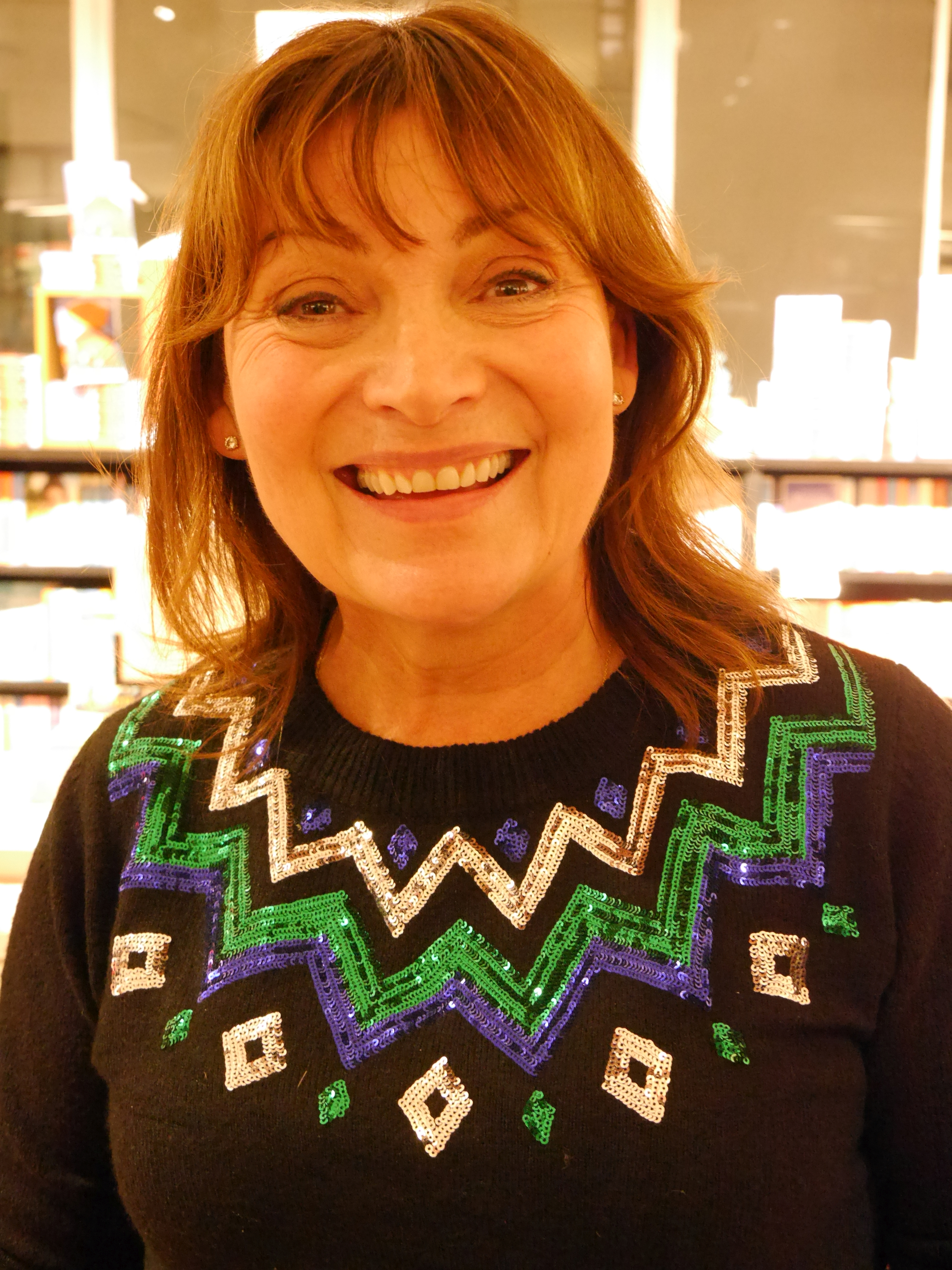
Lorraine Kelly (2010–present)

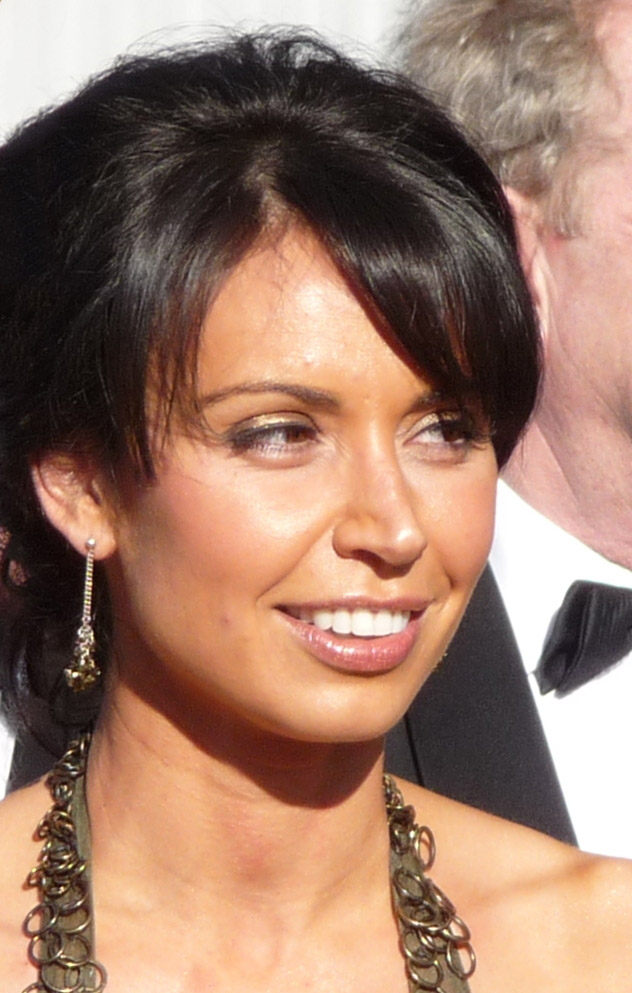
Christine Lampard (2017–present)

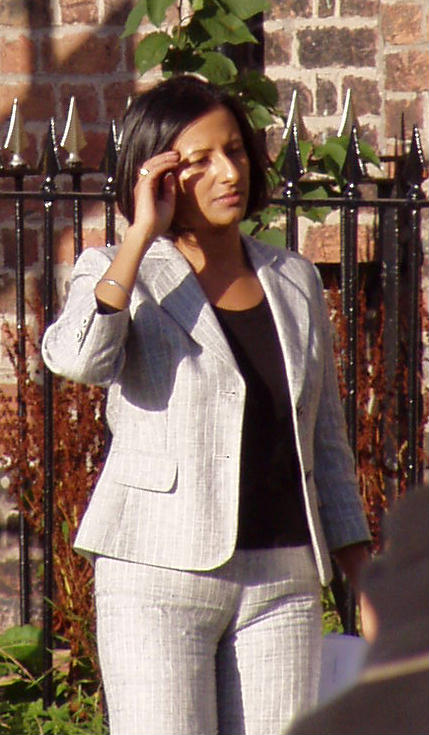
Ranvir Singh (2020–present)

== Crossovers ==
=== Daybreak ===
On ITV's previous breakfast show, Daybreak, there was a preview of the day's edition of Lorraine on each day at around 07:30 with a chat between the programmes' hosts prior to a handover at 08:30. This preview was originally shown at 08:15 but was moved to an earlier slot in March 2011. On 30 November 2010, Daybreak co-presenter Adrian Chiles wore a kilt and made an on-screen visit to the Lorraine studio to congratulate Lorraine Kelly on her birthday and mark St Andrew's Day. On 20 July 2011, Lorraine was presented from the Daybreak studio due to technical problems.

=== Good Morning Britain ===
After Daybreak ended on 25 April 2014, its replacement Good Morning Britain began the following Monday (28 April 2014), as a result Lorraine now follows Good Morning Britain. Each day there is a preview of the Lorraine show on Good Morning Britain at 8:15 (after the regional news bulletin opt out). From March–July 2020, Lorraine hosted in the final hour of GMB (9.00-10.00) due to her program being suspended due to the COVID-19 Pandemic. The final hour was renamed GMB with Lorraine.

== Logo gallery ==
The programme has had five different logos since it began airing in 2010, usually sporting a distinctive purple colour.

Lorraine logos gallery

The first logo which launched the same day as Daybreak.

The second logo introduced to coincide with the Daybreak relaunch.

The circle logo introduced with new graphics.

The logo was altered slightly to accommodate the launch of Good Morning Britain.

Current logo used (2015–)
