= Ross Kelly (presenter) =

Scottish TV presenter (born 1961)

- Born: 21 July 1961 (age 65)
- Presenting career
- Show: This Morning
- Stations: BBC, ITV
- Time slot: Varies
- Style: Reporter, newsreader
- Country: Scotland

Ross Kelly (born 21 July 1961) is a Scottish TV presenter who appeared on Lookaround, GMTV (1993–2000) and The Heaven and Earth Show. Kelly was born in Galashiels, Scotland and studied at the University of Edinburgh in language and literature.

In 1984, having originally wanted to work for The Scotsman or the Edinburgh Evening News, Kelly joined Central Television on their trainee scheme, going on to become a full-time reporter. In 1987, Kelly joined Lookaround and became a reporter and presenter. In 1990, Kelly joined This Morning.

In 1993, Kelly joined GMTV as a producer, but quickly became a relief presenter and reporter. In 1999, he was quiz master for BBC2's Whose House.

In July 2000, Kelly left GMTV and went on to present The Heaven and Earth Show and Burn Your Bills, a Scottish Television gameshow and again helped out on This Morning. He appeared on Lily Savage's Blankety Blank in 2001.
