= Sarah Moore (journalist) =

British journalist and academic (fl. 2025)

Sarah Jones, also known as Sarah Moore, is a former British television reporter and presenter. Moore is now an academic and professor having worked at numerous British higher education institutions and since June 2024, has been the Pro-Vice Chancellor of Education at Solent University in Southampton.

Moore grew up in Redditch, Worcestershire, England and studied Philosophy at the University of Warwick. Whilst at University she competed nationally in Latin and Ballroom dancing. She then studied at Cardiff Journalism School, whilst at the same time gaining work experience as a weekend news editor for a radio station in Wolverhampton, where she produced and presented news bulletins. She undertook her course work placement at ITV Central.

== Media career ==
Her media career began as a reporter and presenter in 2003, working for ITV Central, where she won two awards for an investigation into drug-rape. In 2006 she moved to ITV News working as a reporter, before in October 2006 moving to GMTV, where she covered stories in Europe, the Caribbean and the UK. In summer 2007 she became New York Correspondent for GMTV, a post she held until August 2010. Amongst other stories she reported from the campaign trail with Hillary Clinton in the 2008 U.S. Presidential Elections.

She played a role in the first Sex and the City movie after auditioning as part of a story.

== Academic career ==
During the 2009/10 academic year she lectured on journalism at London Metropolitan University and gained her teaching qualifications. In September 2010 she moved to the University of Salford where she began to teach broadcast journalism. Moore was Head of the Birmingham School of Media at Birmingham City University. Moore holds a PhD from Coventry University (2019): her thesis title was "Locating presence: from storytelling to storyliving in immersive experiences". She has published extensively on virtual and augmented reality, while continuing to make and create immersive experiences. Moore held the role Pro-Vice Chancellor of Academic Enhancement and Research at the University of Gloucestershire. She has an executive MBA from De Montfort University.

In June 2024, Moore was appointed the Pro-Vice Chancellor of Education at Solent University in Southampton.
