= List of GMTV programmes =

The following details are for the programmes that GMTV (Good Morning Television) broadcast on ITV.

GMTV is the former breakfast television franchise for the UK's ITV network. It began broadcasting on 1 January 1993 (New Year’s Day 1993) and finished on 3 September 2010, being replaced by ITV Breakfast.

== GMTV ==
=== 1993–2000 ===
GMTV is the original brand for GMTV's weekday breakfast magazine programme from 6:00 am. It included national and international news stories, regional news, weather, interviews, cookery and health features, human-interest and showbiz stories, and competitions.

In spring 1993, shortly after the channel's launch, a separate news-focused programme was introduced between 6:00 am and 7:00 am, which in early 1994 became The Reuters News Hour. The main 6:00–9:00 am programme remained named GMTV but, as part of the show's new look for the millennium, this main programme later became GMTV Today.

On 3 January 2000, GMTV relaunched and changed the names of each of their programmes. This now meant the programme GMTV did not exist. This was then split up into The Newshour and GMTV Today. This titling for the programmes remained until January 2009, when GMTV relaunched. The first presenters were:

- Eamonn Holmes
- Anne Davies
- Michael Wilson
- Fiona Armstrong
- Lorraine Kelly

=== 2009–2010 ===
GMTV underwent a major revamp on 5 January 2009, reverting to its original title, and incorporating the GMTV Newshour into the show as well. The show returned with a new set and new onscreen graphics. For the first time since the station's launch the logo was changed from the 'sun' logo. Despite the changes, the same theme music and headline beds were still used throughout the programme and nothing altered with the weather until 18 January 2010. However, on 9 March 2009, GMTV introduced a new theme music and headline beds to its main programmes, replacing the previous music that had been in use since 2000. On 31 August 2009, GMTV saw the introduction of 3D graphics, graphic animations, through the use of a new system called VizRT, and a voice-over announcer to introduce presenters at the top of the hour. These were later slightly revised in October of that year.

The show had previously been criticised for its poor journalistic approach although from 2009 it took on a more confident approach, with 7-minute bulletins at the top of the hour, a detailed bulletin at half-past the hour, and the Top Stories at 15 and 45 minutes past each hour. These replaced the hour and half-hour bulletins which featured previously.

Fiona Phillips and Andrea McLean left the show in late 2008. In November 2008 it was announced that Sky News business presenter Emma Crosby would replace Phillips, and the BBC's Kirsty McCabe would replace McLean as weather presenter. Aside from the new members of the team, previous presenters continued to present in their previous slots and, from August 2009, a voice-over at the top of the hour referred to the show as GMTV with .... This continued until Penny Smith left on 4 June 2010, with the same presenters on air from 6:00–8:35/9:25 am.

In November 2009, ITV plc took full control of the broadcaster after purchasing The Walt Disney Company's 25% share.

- The editor of GMTV, Martin Frizell, quit his role, as Disney's share of the company was sold, and was replaced temporarily by Sue Walton. It was announced on 7 May 2010 that former The One Show editor Ian Rumsey would take on the role as of June 2010, with Paul Connolly as his deputy.
- On 4 March 2010, it was announced that presenter and newsreader Penny Smith was leaving GMTV, with presenter John Stapleton being redeployed as special correspondent.
- On 19 April 2010, it was announced that The One Show presenter Adrian Chiles was quitting his roles with the corporation, to join ITV on a six-year contract.
- On 21 April 2010, it was confirmed that Ben Shephard was quitting GMTV after 10 years, after earlier telling management he would not be renewing his contract. His two-year contract ended in April 2010; however, he stayed with GMTV until July 2010. He then focused on a number of new projects with ITV and other channels.
- On 4 June 2010, Penny Smith left GMTV with John Stapleton presenting on location. From 7 June, Andrew Castle, Emma Crosby, Kate Garraway and Ben Shephard presented from 6 am–8.30 am with Stapleton taking on a new role of special correspondent and providing cover when the male anchors were absent.
- On 11 June 2010 it was confirmed that Andrew Castle was quitting GMTV in September after 10 years with the company.
- On 9 July 2010 it was confirmed that the GMTV programme would be axed in favour of Daybreak.
- On 30 July 2010, Ben Shephard left GMTV, and from 2 August, Andrew Castle presented most days alongside Emma Crosby or Kate Garraway, with special correspondent John Stapleton providing cover.
- GMTV ended on 3 September 2010, featuring Andrew Castle and Emma Crosby as hosts.

== GMTV with Lorraine ==
The show featured the latest fashion, food and celebrity gossip, hosted by Lorraine Kelly. There was also regular specialist guests, who made regular appearances. Owing to Lorraine living in Scotland, Monday and Tuesday episodes were broadcast live, with Wednesday and Thursday's shows pre-recorded and broadcast as live. The show's target audience was women; therefore, during events such as Fashion Week, the programme broadcast live from location with fashion expert Mark Heyes.

=== History ===
Lorraine Kelly began presenting Top of the Morning in January 1993. In March when Fiona Armstrong walked out of the main GMTV show, Lorraine moved to the GMTV slot and Fern Britton and Amanda Redington took over hosting Top of the Morning. Top of the Morning was produced by an independent production company.

In 1994, it was replaced with the GMTV-produced Quarter to Nine. In June 1994, Kelly went on maternity leave, returning in November 1994 to do a mother and baby slot. This led to her becoming the main presenter of Nine O'Clock Live. The show proved so popular that it moved to the earlier 8:35 am slot had been retitled Lorraine Live in autumn 1997.

The main guest host for Lorraine Kelly when she was ill or on holiday was Fiona Phillips, but after the birth of Fiona's children, she shared the job with Andrea McLean. Occasionally, when neither was available, guest hosts were drafted in, such as Dale Winton and Paul O'Grady. After 2008, once both Andrea and Fiona had left, guest hosts were drafted in.

In January 2000, GMTV rebranded to GMTV Today, and Lorraine's show changed its name to LK Today.

As part of the later rebrand that took place at the start of 2009, the show again changed its title to GMTV with Lorraine, to coincide with GMTV Today changing back to GMTV. Lorraine moved for the first time into the main GMTV studio, instead of having her own part of the studio to host from.

In November 2009, ITV plc took full control of the broadcaster after purchasing The Walt Disney Company's 25% share.

The format of the show between January and September 2010 included Lorraine giving a brief introduction describing what was coming up on the show, before discussing the main stories from the morning's newspapers with a male and female reviewer. The show's first guests tended to be interviewed next; however, some days there would be money-saving advice from Martin Lewis or a fashion feature from Mark Heyes in that slot. A news summary was shown at 9:00 am presented by Penny Smith or Helen Fospero, followed by a brief weather summary from Clare Nasir or Kirsty McCabe. The chef who was appearing that week then cooked the dish for the day in the GMTV kitchen, before the final guests made their appearance. The competition that ran on GMTV also appeared throughout the show. The programme was sponsored by Matalan and Actimel.

For 2010, the GMTV kitchen was introduced which would involve a chef appearing for the entire week cooking their dish at 9:00 am. The kitchen was set up in the area where the news desk was usually positioned; however, when GMTV moved to Studio 3, the kitchen faced a new look, and the position of it moved.

In April 2010, to make GMTV's programming more consistent, GMTV with Lorraine began airing all year round, instead of breaking during school holidays, with guest presenters. For the first week of the school holidays, ITV News anchor Nina Hossain presented the show, with Ruth Langsford presenting the following week.

On 9 July 2010, as well as the announcement that GMTV had been axed to make way for Daybreak, it was also revealed that Lorraine's new programme Lorraine would replace GMTV with Lorraine.

On 16 July 2010, Lorraine presented her last show before leaving, and throughout the summer holidays Fiona Phillips, Emma Bunton and Kirsty Gallacher each presented her show for two weeks. Myleene Klass presented the final week of the show.

== Newshour ==
Newshour was launched in March 1993, and was GMTV's weekday news-oriented breakfast programme, broadcasting for an hour from the start of GMTV's weekday broadcast at 6:00 am. From 21 February 1994, it was contracted out to Reuters, and by April the viewing figures had increased from 200,000 to just over 1 million. The programme included national and international news stories, regional news, weather and newspaper reviews, plus various guests, and was designed to be more serious than the lighter and more tabloid GMTV Today programme which followed. From January 2009, the Newshour title was scrapped, and the programme was merged with GMTV Today to create one GMTV name again. The same presenters from Newshour continued to present the 6:00 am to 7:00 am slot until June 2010 (Penny Smith and John Stapleton).

== GMTV Today ==
GMTV Today was GMTV's flagship weekday breakfast programme, comprising national and international news stories, regional news, weather, human-interest features and competitions. It was also designed to be more lighter and friendlier against the Newshour which preceded it. The original presenters were Eamonn Holmes and Lorraine Kelly. Kelly was replaced by Anthea Turner in 1994, but she left in December 1996. From 1997, Fiona Phillips presented alongside Eamonn Holmes (Monday to Wednesday) and Andrew Castle and Kate Garraway (Thursday to Friday). In April 2005, when Holmes left, he was replaced by relief and Entertainment Today presenter Ben Shephard.

When GMTV relaunched in 2009, it merged with the Newshour with Today to try to recreate a more news-based content throughout the entirety of the show and create consistency. Part of the relaunch was due to the significant presenter changes. These included the departure of Fiona Phillips and Andrea McLean, who were replaced by Emma Crosby and Kirsty McCabe. The same presenters from Today continued to present the 7:00 am to 8:30/9:25 am slot until June 2010, and then 6:00 am to 8:30/9:25 am slot until the demise of the show.

== Sunday Best ==
Sunday Best was GMTV's original Sunday magazine programme, launched in January 1993. It was originally intended to be a Sunday edition of the regular weekday programme, featuring the regular lifestyle and human interest stories, interviews, and news bulletins. Originally it aired from 7:20 am–8:50 am and was hosted by Eamonn Holmes and Anne Davies. By the start of March it was moved to 6:30 am–8:00 am.

However, as part of the station's relaunch in April 1993, Eamonn Holmes moved to become the main anchor of the weekday GMTV programme with Mike Morris replacing him. It was reduced to a 60-minute slot from 7:00 am–8:00 am, from 25 April 1993. Sunday Best started to introduce more political aspects to the programme, and over time moved from being a general magazine programme to become a weekly political programme. Anne Davies left the programme in January 1994 when the format started to change to increase the amount of current affairs. Mike Morris left in mid September after being unhappy with the refocus of the programmes. Roy Hattersley was drafted in to present.

The last programme was on 9 October 1994. It was suddenly replaced the following Sunday on 16 October 1994 by The Sunday Review (a 60-minute signed review of the week's news which had been broadcasting since early 1993 under the name "Timeshift"), and The Sunday Programme, shortly after Mike Morris left GMTV, stating that Sunday Best was becoming too political for a Sunday morning.

== The Sunday Programme ==
The Sunday Programme was GMTV's political programme. It launched on 16 October 1994 as a replacement for Sunday Best, which was GMTV's original Sunday morning magazine. The programme aired between 7:00 am and 8:00 am, just after The Sunday Review (a 60-minute signed review of the week's news).

It was originally presented by Alastair Stewart, who left in 2001, and Steve Richards took over. From 1995 to 2001, the programme was called Alastair Stewart's Sunday Programme, but this was changed when Alastair left in 2001. In 2008, the programme was quietly axed and replaced with children's programming.

== Entertainment Today ==
Entertainment Today was GMTV's entertainment round-up show on Fridays, designed to replace LK Today at the end of the week. It aired at 8:40 am. The programme was broadcast for 45 minutes, and included interviews with actors and actresses from upcoming films and music performances. Presented by Ben Shephard and Jenni Falconer originally, as Ben started to present more during the week for GMTV, Michael Underwood was also introduced as a presenter. In 2008, the show was replaced by The Richard Arnold Show in July, which aired for six weeks. After the show's run, Entertainment Today didn't return, and instead the main GMTV Today show was extended to 9:25 am every Friday.

== The Richard Arnold Show ==
The Richard Arnold Show first aired in the summer of 2007, as a replacement for Entertainment Today while it took a six-week break. It aired in the same slot as Entertainment Today; Fridays at 8:40 am. The programme was broadcast for 45 minutes, and included TV related guests and entertainment features. The show returned again in the summer of 2008, owing to the popularity, for another six-week series. GMTV's TV critic Richard Arnold was at the helm. The following week, GMTV Today extended its on-air time to 9:25 am, as it was decided that Entertainment Today would not return.

== Children's programmes ==
=== Eat Your Words ===
Eat Your Words was a game show created by Clive Doig in which kids had to solve challenges linked to words and food. The series started on 12 February 1994 with Konnie Huq and Mark Speight. In 1995, Simon Parkin become the presenter and was joined by Julia Binsted. The series ended on 24 February 1996.

=== Toonattik ===
Toonattik was the flagship children's strand of GMTV (known as CITV at weekends). It began on 5 February 2005 and was presented by Jamie Rickers and Anna Williamson. The strand aired on Saturdays and Sundays from 7:25 am until GMTV's closedown at 9:25 am. The original slot featured games, competitions and studio guests combined with the American imported cartoons. However, on 6 March 2010 it was reported that Toonattik and Action Stations! presenters Jamie and Anna would be made redundant, as part of ITV plc's buyout of Disney's 25% share in GMTV. Threrefore, on 9 May 2010, Jamie and Anna departed and from the following weekend, the slot relaunched with out-of-vision presentation. From that point, Toonattik also featured British cartoons.

As of 12 March 2006, GMTV simulcasted Toonattik on the CITV channel during their allocated broadcast time, allowing younger Sky Digital, Virgin Media and Freeview viewers to access the show through the children's section of the EPG for the first time. Also, for the first time on the EPG, it gave details for the programmes broadcast in the Toonattik time slot.

=== Action Stations! ===
Action Stations! was the flagship children's strand of the British breakfast television station, GMTV2 (branded as part of CITV). The slot aired between 6:00 am and 8:40 am on the CITV channel.

It began broadcasting on 13 March 2006 and was simulcast on both the CITV channel and ITV2; however, it moved to ITV4 on 17 March 2008, meaning that ITV2 could broadcast 24 hours a day. From 7 June 2010, ITV4 ceased simulcasting, meaning that from early June 2010, GMTV2 could be seen on the CITV channel only, again allowing ITV4 to broadcast 24 hours a day.

Originally, Action Stations! featured the voices of Toonattik presenters Jamie Rickers and Anna Williamson in the form of robots with pre-recorded links in between cartoons, and was later voiced by Mike Rance as a spaceship captain. Between September 2009 and May 2010, the slot had the presenters presenting links from the Action Station's "space base".

=== Diggit/Diggin' It ===
Diggit/Diggin' It was one of GMTV's weekend children's programmes, which began on 14 March 1998 and replaced Wake Up in the Wild Room. It also replaced Disney Club on Sunday mornings. It was broadcast from 7:10 am to 9:25 am on Saturdays and 8:00 am to 9:25 am on Sundays. Additional editions on bank holidays and summer holidays were shown under the name Diggit Extra.

Initially, the show was presented by Paul Ballard (known on screen as Des) and Fearne Cotton. On Des's weekends off, the show was often co-presented by Reggie Yates. In September 1998, the show launched a search for a new presenter (similar to the one that had discovered Fearne a few years earlier). Viewers had the chance to vote for a winner in December 1998; the winner was Jack Stratton. Jack co-presented with Des and Fearne on both shows for a time, before becoming a solo presenter of pre-recorded inserts on the Sunday show. He was asked to leave the show owing to end of contract, and in 2000 Fearne also left to concentrate on her other CITV series, the reins being handed over to Laura Jaye and Victoria Hickson. Des left the show in 2002 and GMTV relaunched the show as Diggin' It in January 2003, including a giant puppet named "It". Laura and Victoria also left and were replaced with Liam Dolan (previously a presenter on CBBC) and Abbie Pethullis, with voiceovers from Phil Gallagher.

From 2003, for the first time Diggin' It was allowed to have its presenters discussing the weekend's line-up on CITV every Friday afternoon. Liam Dolan was seen sending a Happy Birthday message to CITV on 3 January 2003 on behalf of the Diggin'It team. The show was dropped on 30 January 2005 to make way for the merger of Diggin' It and Up on the Roof into Toonattik.

=== Saturday Disney ===
Saturday Disney was GMTV's first children's programme, broadcast from 2 January 1993 to 30 March 1996 on Saturday mornings. Initially presented by Stuart Miles and Pippa Ford-Jones, with other presenters including Tara Lynne O'Neill, was a mixture of Disney cartoons old and new, celebrity guests, games and features. The set featured a wonky house, an "outside" area (which was in fact still the studio), a jail cell, and an area known as "the splatter dome". The entire set was deliberately cartoon-like in appearance.

After around five months into the series, Ford-Jones was suddenly dropped from the show. The reasons surrounding her departure are not clear. At first, Miles told the audience that "Pippa isn't here this week" and introduced Carmen Ejogo as a stand-in. Ford-Jones never returned and was soon removed from the opening title sequence. However, some pre-recorded location items featuring Ford-Jones were shown over the weeks after her departure. Ejogo remained as the female presenter on a permanent basis, and, after the departure of Miles, became the sole presenter until the show's demise.

Disney cartoons were the main staple around which the show was built. GMTV came under criticism for extending the show's running time in early 1993. After just three months in April 1993, GMTV replaced Teen Win Lose Or Draw, which ran from 8:50 to 9:25 am, with a newly imported cartoon Darkwing Duck, which ran under the Saturday Disney strand. It was said that GMTV was putting ratings and advertising revenues before educational values. In May 1995, the series was reduced to finish at 8:50 am to allow Mighty Morphin Power Rangers to be shown.

=== Wake Up in the Wild Room ===
Wake Up in the Wild Room was a children's programme broadcast from 13 April 1996 to 7 March 1998 on Saturday mornings. Produced in partnership with Disney, it was presented by Dave Benson Phillips. The grand finale at the end of the show had a game in which contestants had to pick a number from the Big House (e.g., number 5 was a window, number 9 was a roof) but would have to watch out for traps that could result with a pie being thrown in their face by resident pie thrower Gary the Ghost, who wore white ghost makeup and a milkman's uniform. Gary also pied various celebrity interview guests, most notably Donna Air, who had uttered a word that had been deemed taboo for that episode's duration.

=== The Disney Club/Disney Adventures/Road Hog ===
The Disney Club started on 3 September 1989 and was produced by Scottish Television and Buena Vista International Television, and went out on Sundays at 9:25 am. The programme mainly broadcast from September to April, taking a spring and summer break.

Original presenters

- (1989–1992): Andrea Boardman, John Eccleston Richard Orford
- (1992–1993) Andrea Boardman, Paul Hendy, Richard Orford

In January 1993, the series was moved to also broadcast on GMTV and overlapped past 9:25 am cut off time. It continued to be produced by Scottish Television, which was one of the owners of GMTV at the time. By September 1993, the series had moved back to 9:25 am, with Jenny Powell replacing Andrea Boardman. A new programme called Disney Adventures with Andrea Boardman filled the time slot instead. When the series returned on 4 September 1994, the series had once again moved back to broadcast during GMTV overlapped the 9:25 am cut off time, by starting at 8 am. Philippa Forrester joined the team, alongside Richard Orford, with Andrea Boardman continuing with inserts films.

Disney Adventures returned on 6 May 1995 with Sally Gray, Jenny Powell, Jocelyn Barker and Yvette Fielding presenting instead of Boardman, continuing until October 1995.

Disney Club returned on 5 November 1995, with new presenters Craig Doyle, Jenny Powell and Sean Maguire. The last series from September 1997 became two separate Disney blocks, but presented by the same people: Craig Doyle and Paul "Des" Ballard with a name change taking place on 25 September called Road Hog. The series finished on 26 April 1998, replaced by Diggit.

=== Up on the Roof ===
Up on the Roof was one of GMTV's children's slots, presented by Jamie Rickers, broadcast from June 2001 to February 2005. It was regularly broadcast on only Sundays from around 8:15 am straight after Diggit/Diggin' It until 9:25 am when GMTV handed over to CITV. The cartoon series that were shown were mainly those that featured such action animated programmes as He-Man, Spider-Man and Teenage Mutant Ninja Turtles. Up on the Roof ended on 30 January 2005 and was replaced by Toonattik from 5 February, broadcast on both Saturdays and Sundays.

=== Parkin's In / Fun in the Sun ===
Parkin's In and Fun in the Sun was a children's programme block presented by Simon Parkin. The series appeared during school holidays only, including half term, usually from 8:35 am to 9:25 am. It was filled with cartoons, guests and Mr Motivator. During the early years, additional programmes were produced for Scotland only, owing to different holidays. The series had ended by 1996.

==== Programmes ====
- Maxie's World
- Alvin and the Chipmunks
- Tom & Jerry Kids
- Galaxy High
- Captain Planet and the Planeteers
- The Legend of Zelda
- The Super Mario Bros. Super Show!
- Mighty Morphin Power Rangers
- V.R. Troopers

== Pre-school programmes ==
=== Rise and Shine ===
Rise and Shine was GMTV's very first Saturday morning children's series, starting on 2 January 1993. It was presented by Kate Weston and Paul Zerdin alongside Paul's puppet character Sam. The series was aimed at younger children. It featured cartoons and programmes such as Count Duckula, Roobarb, The Shoe People, King Rollo, Towser, Victor & Maria James the Cat, Mio Mao, Barbapapa, Rosie and Jim, Mr Men, Ric the Raven, My Little Pony, The Wombles, Gran, Barney & Friends, The Glo Friends, MoonDreamers, Potato Head Kids, Fred Basset, Rainbow Brite and the Color Kids and Muppet Babies. In 1995, the series was axed.

=== The Fluffy Club ===
The Fluffy Club was GMTV's pre-school programming slot which aired every Monday to Friday on the CITV channel between 8:40 am and 9:25 am as part of GMTV2 and every Saturday and Sunday from 6:00 am to 7:25 am on ITV. It was produced by Darrall Macqueen. It was presented by Emma Lee (who replaced original presenter Mandisa Taylor in March 2010) and puppet fluffy duckling "Tiny Little Fluff" (who is seen in the show's logo). The slot launched in September 2008 replacing Wakey Wakey! and featured a combination of both home-grown and American imported programmes.

=== Our House ===
Our House is a children's programme from 1997, created by Scottish Television. The series was about Grannie Banannie and her grandkids Lizzie and Jack. The series was also broadcast outwith GMTV, on Scottish and Grampian Television albeit in Gaelic, and was renamed "Granaidh Bananaidh". The music for the series was produced by The Singing Kettle's Gary Coupland. Kate Copstick, Colin Purves, Kathy Smee and Geoff Felix were among the voice artist. A VHS entitled "The Best of Our House" was released in 1998 by Tempo.

=== Riff and Raff ===
A spin-off of Our House about two microscopic, pea-eating bits of fluff named Riff (who is orange, tall and slightly dim-witted) and Raff (who is purple, short and smart) who hide in Grannie Banannie's bag. The show mainly focuses on the two of them going outside, exploring the big world, and getting into mischief. The episodes would include clips from Our House (named The Grannie Files) and would end with Riff and Raff singing a song during the end credits (named Sing-along-a Riff and Raff). Two VHS releases, "The Video Shop" and "The Zoo", were produced in 1999. Coupland also produced the music and theme tune for this series.

=== Oooberry Telly ===
Oooberry Telly was launched in February 2002 running in the 6:00 am to 7:10am timeslot. Because of the block's name, the continuity package would always lead to Ni Ni's Treehouse, being the last preschool programme shown before handing over to Diggit / Up on the Roof. The "Horace & Oupagogo" shorts from said series would also be shown as separate miniseries while the viewers tuning in waited for Ni Ni's Treehouse to air. The block was discontinued in mid-2003 with all the preschool programmes being branded under "GMTV Kids", the logo of which holds the Disney Mickey Mouse text font.

=== Wakey! Wakey! ===
Wakey! Wakey! was GMTV's pre-school slot that ran every weekend on CITV, GMTV, and GMTV2 from 6:00 am to 7:25 am. It was originally presented by Kerry Newell (of Fun Song Factory fame) who was later replaced by former CBeebies presenter Sue Monroe from 2006. Before Wakey! Wakey!, Toonattik ran the pre-school slot for the first half of 2005 with pre-recorded voiceovers with Jamie and Anna taking over from 7:25 am. In September 2008, the show was relaunched as The Fluffy Club.
