= Paul Ballard (actor) =

British actor (born 1982)

- Born: 9 March 1982 (age 44); Essex, England
- Other name: Des
- Occupations: Television presenter, actor
- Known for: Presenting children's television
- Criminal charges: Causing death by dangerous driving (August 2021); rape, attempted rape, assault, criminal damage and threats to kill (October 2021).
- Criminal penalty: 9 years in prison and 10 years in prison (consecutive sentence).
- Criminal status: Incarcerated

Paul Ballard (born 9 March 1982) is an English former television presenter and stage actor known by his nickname 'Des' as co-presenter, along with Fearne Cotton, of the Saturday morning children's television programme Diggit from 1998 until 2002. He left Diggit shortly before its relaunch as Diggin' It.

In August 2021, he was sentenced to nine years prison for causing the death of two people by dangerous driving. In October that year, he was given a consecutive sentence of ten years prison for rape, threats to kill and related crimes.

== Career ==
Ballard made his TV debut in 1995, playing a trick or treater who beat up Rik Mayall and Adrian Edmondson in the Bottom episode "Terror". He was next seen co-presenting the Disney Club in the mid-1990s. After a change in the show's format, he presented a Sunday morning slot called Roadhog wherein he took a Volkswagen Camper Van, decorated with ears and orange spots, to viewers homes and schools.

Ballard appeared in a one off Daz washing powder TV advertisement, with his older sister, and continued his association with the Disney Club between 1995 and 1998.

In April 1998, Ballard and Fearne Cotton launched Diggit as part of GMTV, and continued with the show through until 2002.

Ballard starred as Smee in a stage production of Peter Pan at the Central Theatre in Kent in 2001.

Ballard's absence from TV after 2001 led viewers to speculate as to his whereabouts, with Fearne Cotton admitting in 2010 that the two had lost touch.

== Legal issues ==
In 2014, Ballard and his business partner set up a self-storage business on green belt land in Bulphan without planning permission, and failed to comply with an enforcement notice requiring the business be closed and the land returned to its original state. A nominal order of £1 was made against Ballard's business partner as he had been an unwitting front-man for Ballard. Ballard was not ordered to pay court costs or a fine because the judge thought there was no reasonable prospect of Ballard paying, owing to his incarceration.

On 20 February 2020, Ballard caused an eight car pile-up in Essex resulting in the death of two people. On 14 July 2021, he appeared at the Old Bailey via videolink from HMP Belmarsh, and pleaded guilty to two charges of causing death by dangerous driving. He was sentenced in August 2021 to nine years prison.

On 30 July 2021, Ballard was found guilty of rape, attempted rape, assault, criminal damage and threats to kill, after an incident at a hotel in Hatfield Heath in September 2020. He denied the charges but was found guilty by a jury at Chelmsford Crown Court following two hours of deliberations, with police saying "Ballard has never taken responsibility for his actions". In October 2021, he was sentenced to ten years prison consecutive to his earlier prison term. In December 2021, Basildon Crown Court made a confiscation order of £553,772 against Ballard regarding profits made from his business that had been operating illegally.
