= 3/3 (disambiguation) =

3/3 is an infantry battalion in the United States Marine Corps.

3/3 may also refer to:

- 3/3 Lahore Attacks, a 2009 attack on the Sri Lanka national cricket team
- March 3, the 62nd day of most years in the Gregorian calendar
- 3/3, an early band by Japanese musicians Reck and Chiko Hige of the Contortions and Friction fame.

== See also ==
- 3 + 3
- 3 in Three
- 3.3 (disambiguation)
- 3@Three
