= Richard Arnold (presenter) =

English television presenter and showbusiness journalist

- Born: Richard Andrew Arnold; 24 November 1969 (age 56); Andover, Hampshire, England
- Occupation: Presenter
- Years active: 1990–present
- Television: GMTV; The Richard Arnold Show; Daybreak; Strictly Come Dancing; Good Morning Britain
- Spouse: Stuart Carter (m. 2026)

Richard Andrew Arnold (born 24 November 1969) is an English television presenter and actor. He is currently working as a freelance journalist, and he is the Entertainment Editor for ITV's breakfast show Good Morning Britain.

Arnold has also taken part in a number of television shows, including 71 Degrees North, Let's Dance for Comic Relief, and Strictly Come Dancing, and is also playing a minor role as a cult leader in Neighbours, with Denise van Outen, in September 2019.

== Early life ==
Arnold was born on 24 November 1969 in Andover, Hampshire. He grew up in Charlton, Andover and Inverurie, Aberdeenshire and went to Portway Junior School in Andover. Later, he attended the University of Edinburgh, gaining an MA in English Language and Literature. He then studied journalism at City University London, and then worked for Inside Soap magazine until 1995.

== Career ==
Arnold's first television work was on The Sunday Show for the BBC. In 1997, he became the television critic for GMTV, returning for a longer period in 2000. From 2000-2010, Arnold appeared daily on GMTV, on GMTV Today and LK Today.

=== Presenting ===
During the summer of 2007 and 2008, Arnold hosted his own show, The Richard Arnold Show. In 2009, he was appointed UK Entertainment reporter on Australian breakfast show Sunrise on the Seven Network.

On 11 June 2012, Arnold became the Showbiz Editor for ITV Breakfast programme Daybreak until the show was axed on 25 April 2014. On 28 April 2014, Arnold became Entertainment Editor for ITV's breakfast show, Good Morning Britain.

Arnold has also hosted Soapstar Superchef, Take It or Leave It on Challenge, and Loose Lips, on LivingTV.

=== Guest appearances ===
He has appeared on a celebrity version of Are You Smarter Than A 10 Year Old? on Sky 1. He has also been on The Paul O'Grady Show, Stars in Their Eyes and Stephen Mulhern's celebrity hijacking show Anonymous.

In 2010, Arnold took part in Let's Dance for Comic Relief with Kate Garraway, and advanced to the final. In 2011, he returned to Let's Dance for Sport Relief, once again and was partnered with Penny Smith, and performed Toxic by Britney Spears.

Arnold took part in the first series of Celebrity MasterChef in 2006 and the second series of 71 Degrees North in 2011. In 2014, he participated in the Text Santa special of Tipping Point. In December 2015, he took part in a celebrity episode of The Chase. He participated in Celebrity Haunted Hotel Live in October 2016. In November 2019, Arnold took part in a Good Morning Britain celebrity special edition of The Chase.

In 2020, amid the COVID-19 crisis, Arnold joined the supergroup known as The Celebs which now included Frank Bruno and X Factor winner Sam Bailey to raise money for both Alzheimer's Society and Action for Children. They recorded a new rendition of Merry Christmas Everyone by Shakin' Stevens and it was released digitally on 11 December 2020, on independent record label Saga Entertainment. The music video debuted exclusively on Good Morning Britain the day before release. The song peaked at number two on the iTunes pop chart.

In 2021, he voice cameoed in the UK dub of PAW Patrol: The Movie.

=== Strictly Come Dancing ===
Arnold was partnered with Erin Boag for the 2012 series of Strictly Come Dancing. The couple were eliminated in week 7, having previously survived two "dance-offs" against other competitors.

| Week # | Dance/Song | Judges' scores | | | | | Result |
| Week # | Dance/Song | Craig Revel Horwood | Darcey Bussell | Len Goodman | Bruno Tonioli | Total | Result |
| 1 | Waltz / "You Don't Bring Me Flowers" | 5 | 5 | 7 | 5 | 22 | Safe |
| 2 | Cha-Cha-Cha / "Love Shack" | 3 | 6 | 5 | 5 | 19 | Bottom two |
| 3 | Quickstep / "9 to 5" | 6 | 7 | 6 | 6 | 25 | Safe |
| 4 | Paso Doble / "O Fortuna" | 5 | 5 | 7 | 5 | 22 | Safe |
| 5 | Foxtrot / "Big Spender" | 3 | 5 | 5 | 4 | 17 | Bottom two |
| 6 | Charleston / "Pencil Full of Lead" | 7 | 8 | 7 | 7 | 29 | Safe |
| 7 | Salsa / "Club Tropicana" | 5 | 6 | 7 | 6 | 24 | Eliminated |

=== Radio ===
He has also acted as a presenter on LBC Radio, hosting the show Saturday Night Live.

=== Writing ===
Away from the screen, Arnold writes a weekly column for Hello magazine and Woman's Own magazine. He is also a regular guest columnist for The People and The Sun newspapers and has been an established print journalist for nearly 20 years, beginning his career as a member of the launch team of Inside Soap magazine before leaving in 1995 to freelance career. He has regularly contributed to numerous titles, including the Daily Express and Daily Mail newspapers, plus Closer and TV Choice magazines.
