= 3.3 =

3.3 may refer to:

- Chrysler 3.3 engine, Chrysler's first homegrown front wheel drive 60° V6 engine
- K Desktop Environment 3.3, the fourth release in the third series of releases of K Desktop Environment

== See also ==
- 3 + 3
- 3 in Three
- 3/3 (disambiguation)
- 3@Three
