= Carla Romano =

Scottish journalist and producer

Carolina (Carla) Romano (born 1969 in Dundee) is a Scottish journalist and producer of Italian descent. Romano studied French and politics at the University of Dundee and has a postgraduate diploma in journalism from the University of Strathclyde.

== BBC Radio work ==
Romano began her broadcasting career with Radio Scotland as a producer and reporter. Produced the cultural identity documentary series British Like Me and A Degree of Desperation, a half-hour programme she produced on student prostitution was shortlisted for a Sony Radio Award, but did not collect one. In 1997, Romano worked as a reporter on BBC Radio Scotland's weekly current affairs programmes Eye to Eye and Newsweek. She also produced Radio 5 Live's four-part animal trade documentary series Beastly Business. In 1998, she won a Commission for Racial Equality media award by presenting a BBC radio documentary series on racism in Scotland.

== BBC and GMTV television work ==
Romano moved to television in 1997, reading breakfast and late-night bulletins on BBC Scotland, and occasionally reporting on Scottish stories for BBC News 24. Later she became GMTV's Los Angeles correspondent, (replacing Jackie Brambles). On 4 March 2010, Romano and GMTV parted company.
