= Loose Lips (TV series) =

- Presented by: Richard Arnold; Melinda Messenger
- Country of origin: United Kingdom
- Original language: English
- No. of seasons: 1
- No. of episodes: 44

Production
- Running time: 65 minutes
- Production company: Scream Films

Original release
- Network: Living TV
- Release: 31 March – 28 November 2003

The show Loose Lips was a popular daytime lifestyle and chat show broadcast on the UK channel Living TV.

The show ran for some 40 episodes in 2003, and was presented by Richard Arnold and Melinda Messenger and occasionally featured the beautiful Emma Bunton look-alike, Kerry Hartley, in the gardening segment.

The show also had a controversial spin-off psychic version called 'Psychic Live' which featured Derek Acorah.
