= Emma Crosby =

British television newsreader and journalist (born 1977)

- Born: Emma Catherine Crosby; 5 June 1977 (age 48); St Albans, Hertfordshire, England
- Occupations: Newsreader, television presenter
- Notable credit(s): Sky News; GMTV; 5 News

Emma Catherine Crosby (born 5 June 1977) is a British television newsreader and journalist.

Between 2003 and 2009, Crosby worked at Sky News, regularly co-presenting their breakfast programme Sunrise, along with various other programmes on the channel. In 2009, she joined ITV to co-present GMTV, which she hosted until the show was replaced by Daybreak the following year. She co-hosted GMTV with Andrew Castle or Ben Shephard two or three days a week in rotation with Kate Garraway. She joined Channel 5 in 2011, where she worked as their chief anchor on 5 News until 2015. She returned to Sky News in June 2017.

== Broadcasting career ==
After graduation Crosby joined the BBC, becoming a producer on its rolling news channel, BBC News 24. Moving on from there, she worked for News Direct 97.3 and LBC before joining the Money Channel in 1999.

In 2001, she joined CNBC Europe and became a presenter on European Market Wrap. She spent some time in the United States while with the network and reported for its early morning show Squawk Box, where her mentor was Maria Bartiromo.

Crosby joined Sky News in 2003, presenting the early morning news programme Sunrise. She also regularly co-presented the channel's weekday Sky News Today, and some weekend broadcasts. She won a BAFTA for coverage of the 2007 Glasgow Airport terrorist attack. She subsequently was also the channel's business correspondent and, in October 2007, became a London correspondent on the Fox Business Network.

In January 2009, Crosby moved to the long-running breakfast programme GMTV, replacing presenter Fiona Phillips, who left the channel for family reasons after 16 years. On 1 August 2010, it was announced that Crosby was leaving GMTV with the impending launch of Daybreak, which replaced GMTV. During her time with the show, she had co-presented alongside Ben Shephard, John Stapleton, Kate Garraway and Andrew Castle. She and Castle presented the final edition of GMTV on Friday 3 September 2010.

In October 2010, Crosby confirmed that she would present on CNN, before returning to BBC News. She began presenting on the BBC News Channel's weekend evening slot on 23 October 2010, before moving on to afternoons the following week. On 5 November 2010, she presented the BBC News at One and the afternoon schedule on the BBC News Channel when the BBC News schedule was disrupted due to a 48-hour National Union of Journalists strike.

In February 2011, she was appointed a presenter of 5 News as a replacement for Natasha Kaplinsky, covering the 18:30 edition (previously 19:00) from 14 February. At the time, she also presented the earlier 17:00 edition, following the departure of Matt Barbet on 26 July 2012. In 2012, she presented a travel report from Jordan on C5's travel series called Holiday Heaven on Earth.

== Personal life ==
Crosby lives in South London. She is married to London-based professional photographer Jeremy Peters and they have two children. In February 2017, Crosby revealed that she feared she was losing her overdue baby (Mary) because it had not moved for four hours. She also owns a two-bedroom flat in Cape Town, South Africa, which has views of Table Mountain. Crosby is an ambassador for the charities SOS Villages, RSPCA and Kicks Count.
