= Strictly Come Dancing series 10 =

Strictly Come Dancing
- Series 10
- Presented by: Bruce Forsyth; Tess Daly; Claudia Winkleman
- Judges: Darcey Bussell; Len Goodman; Craig Revel Horwood; Bruno Tonioli
- Celebrity winner: Louis Smith
- Professional winner: Flavia Cacace
- No. of episodes: 25

Release
- Original network: BBC One
- Original release: 15 September – 22 December 2012

Series chronology
- ← Previous; Series 9 Next → Series 11

Strictly Come Dancing returned for its tenth series and began with the launch show on 15 September 2012. The live shows began on 5 October. Sir Bruce Forsyth and Tess Daly returned to present the main show on BBC One and Claudia Winkleman returned to present the results show with Daly. Zoe Ball returned to present the spin-off show Strictly Come Dancing: It Takes Two. Judges Len Goodman, Craig Revel Horwood, and Bruno Tonioli all returned and were joined on the judging panel by series 7 guest judge Darcey Bussell, who replaced Alesha Dixon.

On 20 June 2012, it was announced that Katya Virshilas would not return to the show as a professional. It was later announced that Karen Hauer of Burn the Floor fame would replace her.

The show was broadcast from Wembley Arena on 17 November with all proceeds going to the BBC charity, Children in Need. The show on 10 November was hosted by Daly and Winkleman, while Forsyth took a break before the Wembley Arena show.

Series 10 was the last series of the show to be produced at the studios of the BBC Television Centre in West London. In March 2013 the Television Centre site was closed for redevelopment, with the production of future series moved to Elstree Studios.

Olympic artistic gymnast Louis Smith and Flavia Cacace won the series on 22 December, while Girls Aloud singer Kimberley Walsh and Pasha Kovalev and actress Denise van Outen and James Jordan were the runners-up.

== Format ==
Hosts and Judges for Strictly Come Dancing Series 10

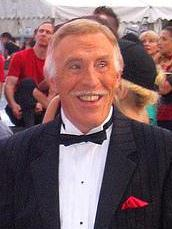
Bruce Forsyth

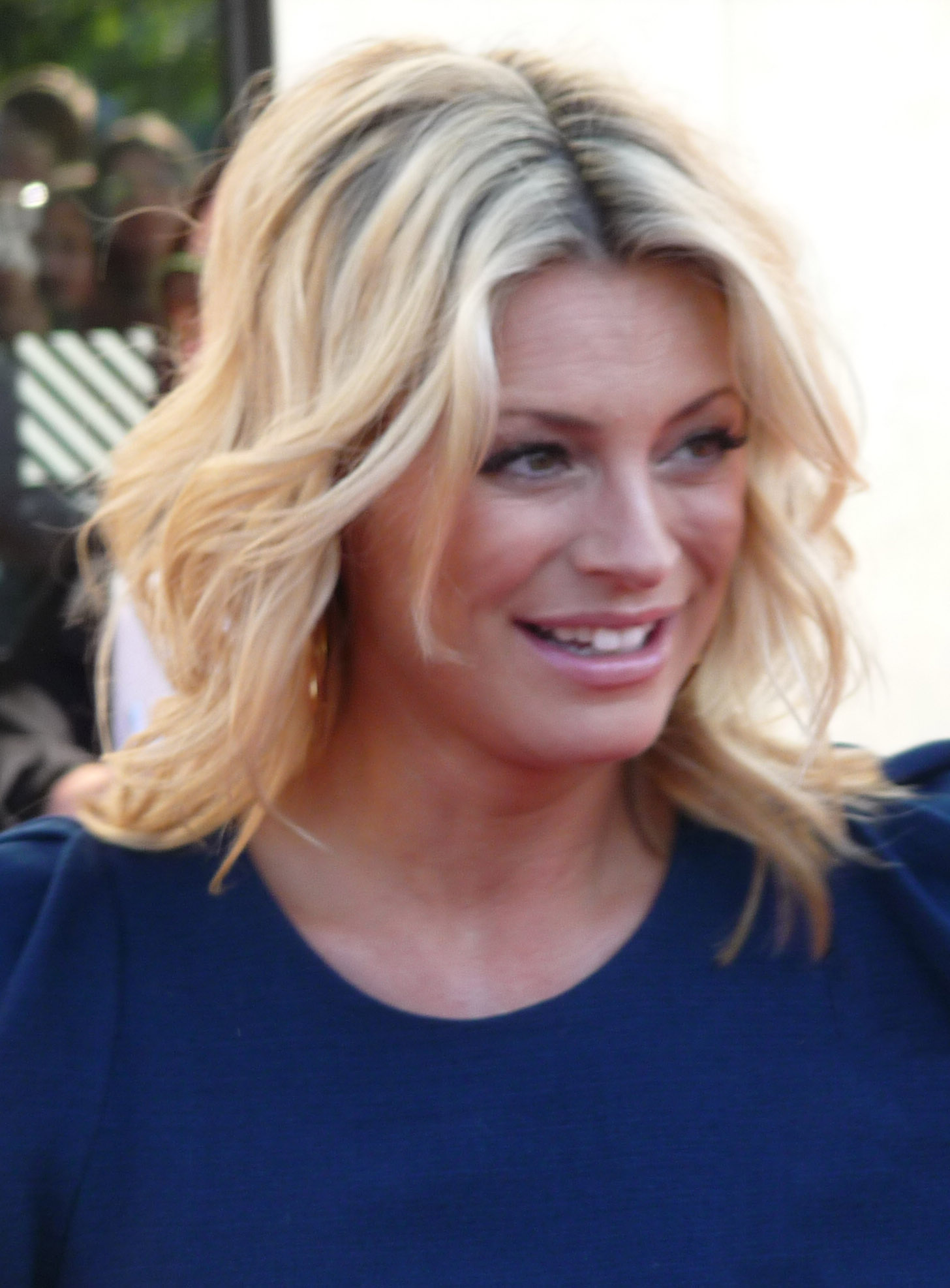
Tess Daly

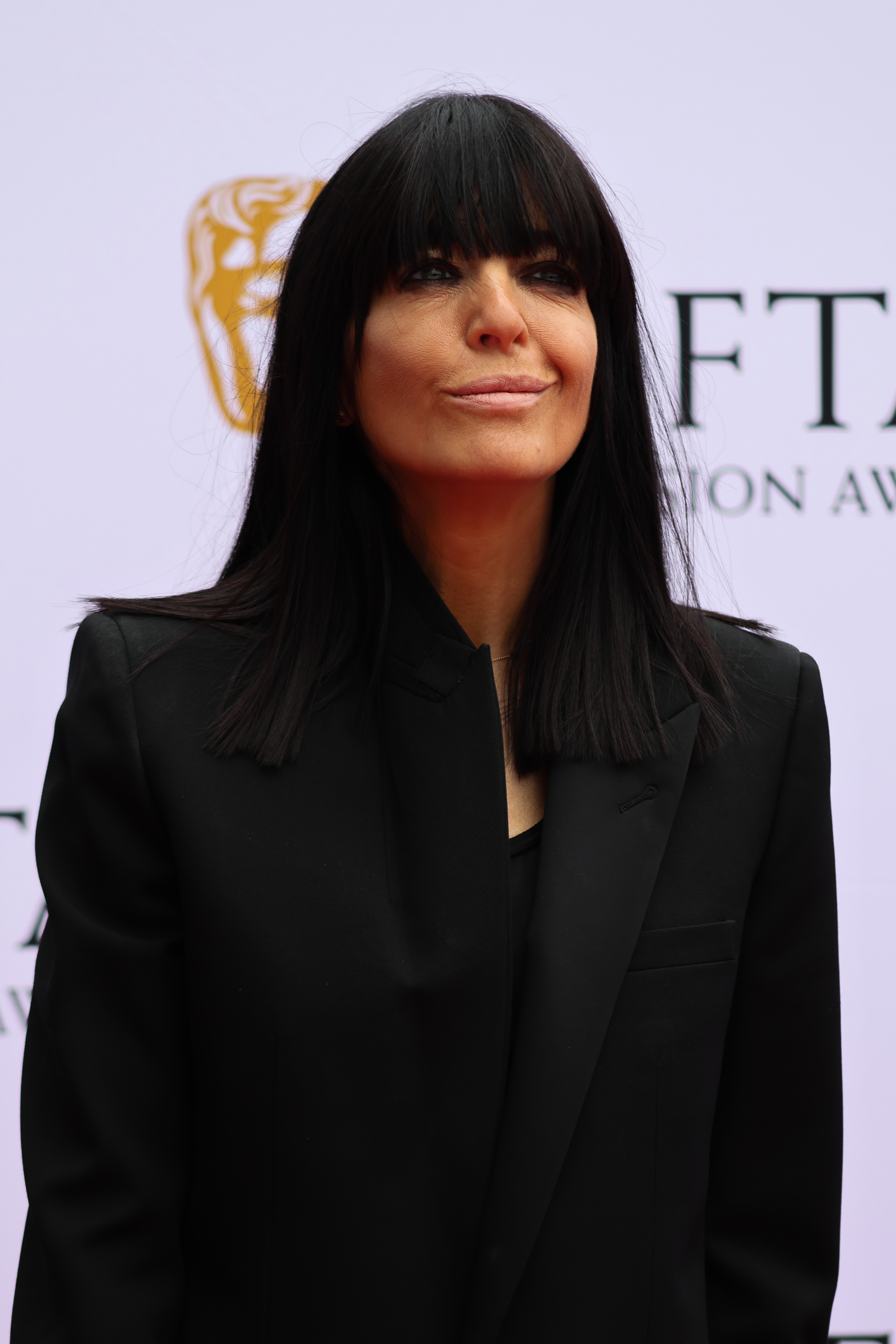
Claudia Winkleman

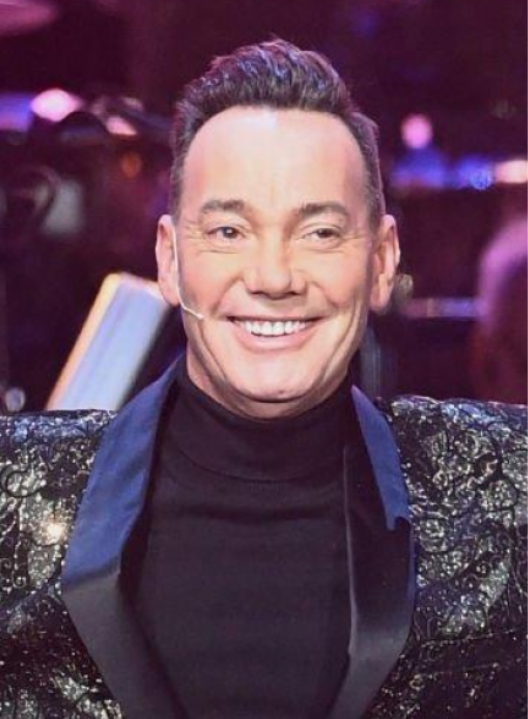
Craig Revel Horwood

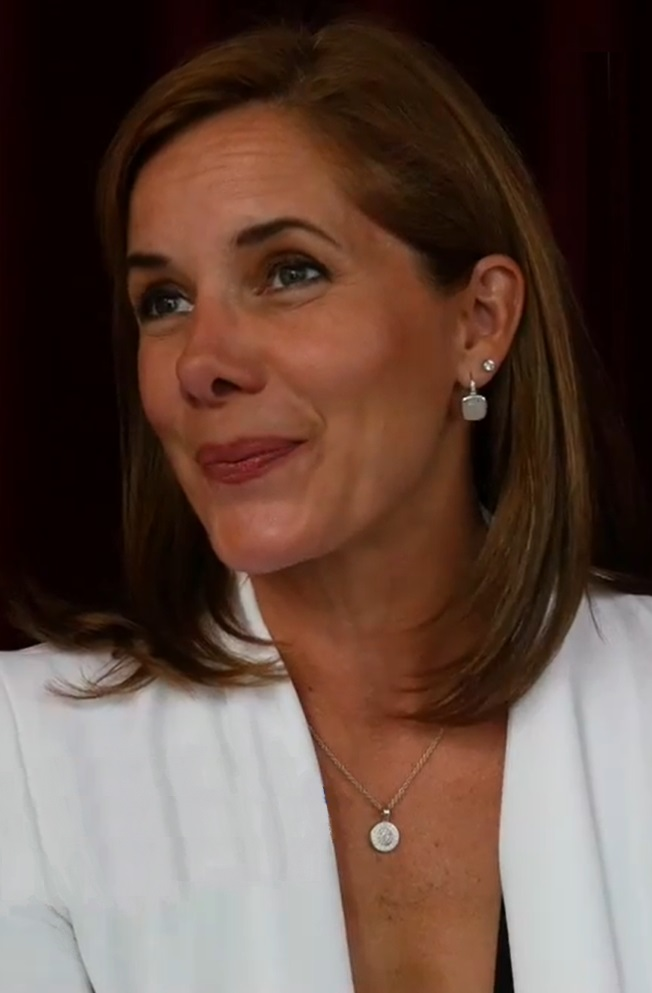
Darcey Bussell

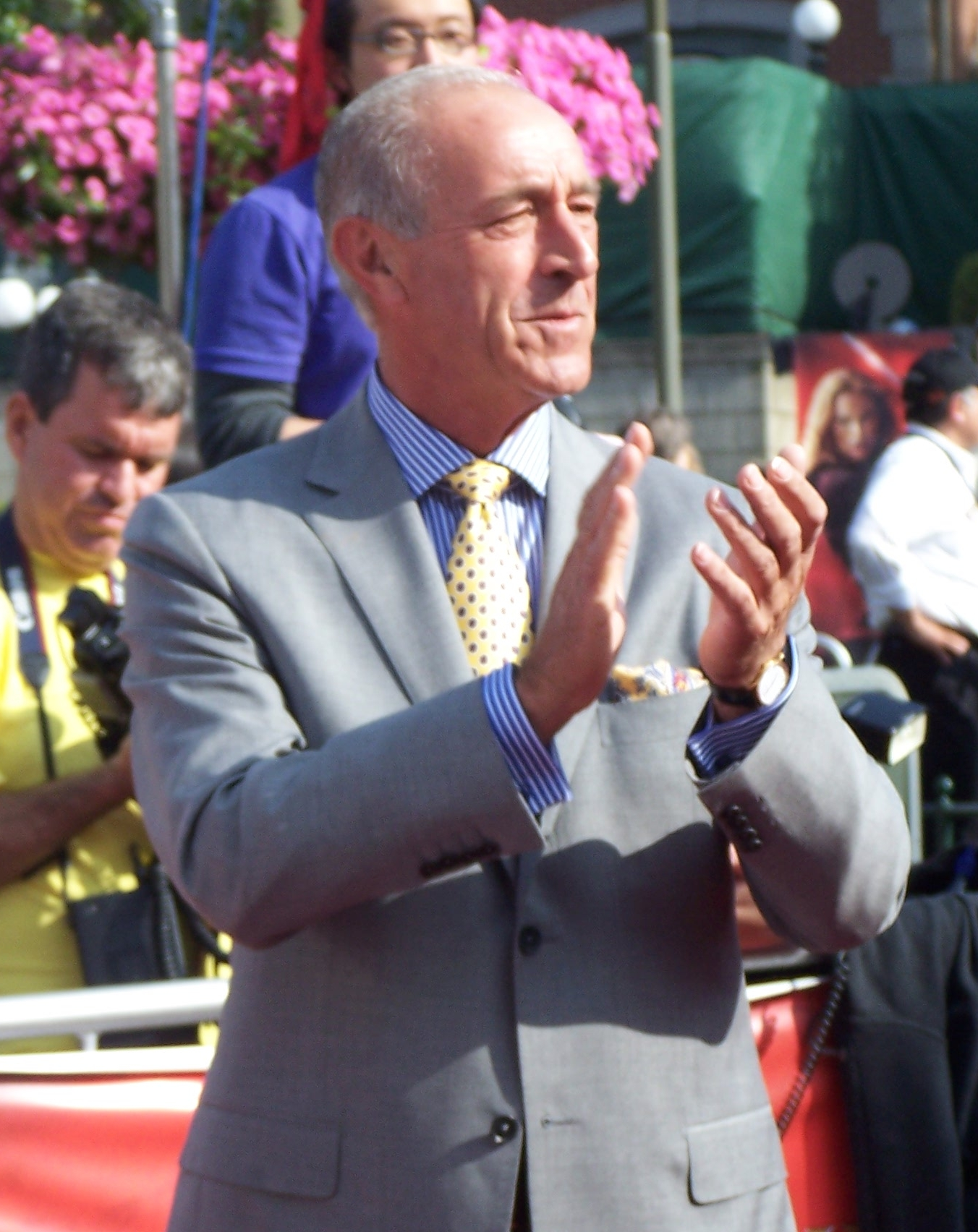
Len Goodman

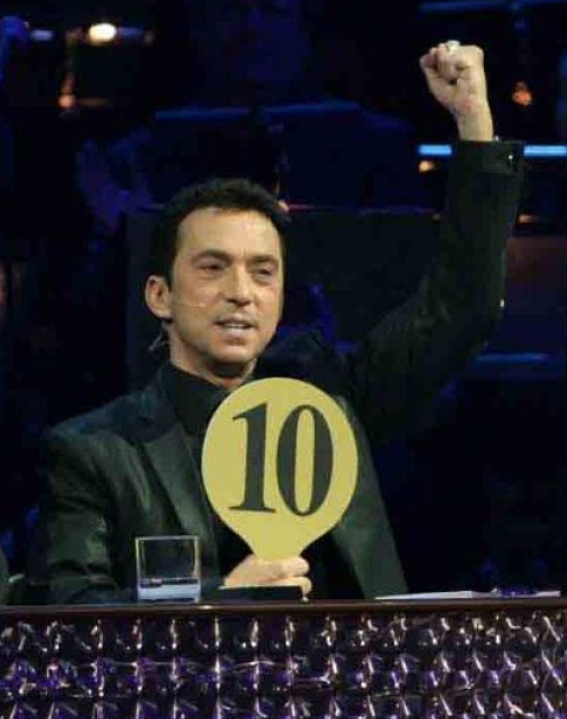
Bruno Tonioli

The couples dance each week in a live show. The judges score each performance out of ten. The couples are then ranked according to the judges' scores and given points according to their rank, with the lowest scored couple receiving one point, and the highest scored couple receiving the most points (the maximum number of points available depends on the number of couples remaining in the competition). The public are also invited to vote for their favourite couples, and the couples are ranked again according to the number of votes they receive, again receiving points; the couple with the fewest votes receiving one point, and the couple with the most votes receiving the most points.

The points for judges' score and public vote are then added together, and the two couples with the fewest points are placed in the bottom two. If two couples have equal points, the points from the public vote are given precedence. The dance-off feature was reinstated, after being absent from the previous two series: the bottom two couples have to perform a final dance, after which each judge votes on which couple should stay and which couple should leave, with Len Goodman, as head judge, having the last and deciding vote.

== Couples ==
This series featured fourteen celebrity contestants.

Johnny Ball was originally partnered with Aliona Vilani; however, following an injury sustained in training before the first live show, Iveta Lukosiute was hired as a replacement partner. This was officially intended as a short-term measure until Vilani was able to return; however, it was later confirmed that Lukosiute would be Ball's full-time partner.

Celebrity	Notability	Professional partner	Status
Johnny Ball	Television presenter	Iveta Lukošiūtė	Eliminated 1st on 14 October 2012
Jerry Hall	Supermodel & actress	Anton Du Beke	Eliminated 2nd on 21 October 2012
Sid Owen	EastEnders actor	Ola Jordan	Eliminated 3rd on 28 October 2012
Colin Salmon	Film & television actor	Kristina Rihanoff	Eliminated 4th on 4 November 2012
Fern Britton	Television presenter	Artem Chigvintsev	Eliminated 5th on 11 November 2012
Richard Arnold	Daybreak presenter	Erin Boag	Eliminated 6th on 18 November 2012
Victoria Pendleton	Olympic track cyclist	Brendan Cole	Eliminated 7th on 25 November 2012
Michael Vaughan	England cricketer	Natalie Lowe	Eliminated 8th on 2 December 2012
Nicky Byrne	Westlife singer	Karen Hauer	Eliminated 9th on 9 December 2012
Lisa Riley	Emmerdale actress	Robin Windsor	Eliminated 10th on 16 December 2012
Dani Harmer	Children's television actress	Vincent Simone	Fourth place on 22 December 2012
Denise van Outen	Actress, singer & presenter	James Jordan	Runners-up on 22 December 2012
Kimberley Walsh	Girls Aloud singer	Pasha Kovalev	Runners-up on 22 December 2012
Louis Smith	Olympic artistic gymnast	Flavia Cacace	Winners on 22 December 2012

== Scoring chart ==
The highest score each week is indicated in bold green with a dagger (†), while the lowest score each week is indicated in italicized red with a double-dagger (‡).

Color key:

Winners
Runners-up
Fourth place
Bottom two
Eliminated

Strictly Come Dancing (series 10) – Weekly scores
Couple	Pl.	Week													
Couple	Pl.	1	2	1+2	3	4	5	6	7	8	9	10	11	12	
Couple	Pl.	1	2	1+2	3	4	5	6	7	8	9	10	11	Show 1	Show 2
Louis & Flavia	1st	27	30	**57**†	30	**35**†	29	33	30	27	**37**†	37	31+38=69	39+40=**79**†	+39=118‡ (Note: This couple finished in first place.)
Denise & James	2nd	25	**32**†	**57**†	**32**†	28	**35**†	**36**†	**39**†	**37**†	32	35 (Note: This couple was in the bottom two, but was not eliminated.)	39+38=77	39+40=**79**†	+40=**119**† (Note: This couple finished in second place.)
Kimberley & Pasha	2nd	28	26	54	29	31	33	34	34	34	34	**40**†	38+40=**78**†	39+39=78	+40=118‡
Dani & Vincent	4th	21	27	48	29	27	33	34	36	36	34	38	34+38=72	36+35=71‡ (Note: This couple was eliminated.)	
Lisa & Robin	5th	**30**†	25	55	29	26	27	32	32	27	31	30	31+32=63‡		
Nicky & Karen	6th	17	18	35‡	27	26	25	30	30	36	30	27‡			
Michael & Natalie	7th	20	15‡	35‡	19	31	31	26‡	35	26	24‡				
Victoria & Brendan	8th	16‡	26	42	22	31	23	30	24‡	21‡					
Richard & Erin	9th	22	19	41	25	22	17‡	29	24‡						
Fern & Artem	10th	19	24	43	23	21	24	27							
Colin & Kristina	11th	23	24	47	26	24	27								
Sid & Ola	12th	26	22	48	17‡	17‡									
Jerry & Anton	13th	18	18	36	18										
Johnny & Iveta	14th	17	20	37											

=== Average chart ===
This table only counts for dances scored on a traditional 40-point scale.

Couple	Rank by average	Total points	Number of dances	Total average
Denise & James	1st	527	15	35.1
Kimberley & Pasha	2nd	519	15	34.6
Louis & Flavia	3rd	502	15	33.5
Dani & Vincent	4th	458	14	32.7
Lisa & Robin	5th	352	12	29.3
Nicky & Karen	6th	266	10	26.6
Michael & Natalie	7th	227	9	25.2
Colin & Kristina	8th	124	5	24.8
Victoria & Brendan	9th	193	8	24.1
Fern & Artem	10th	138	6	23.0
Richard & Erin	11th	158	7	22.6
Sid & Ola	12th	82	4	20.5
Johnny & Iveta	13th	37	2	18.5
Jerry & Anton	14th	54	3	18.0

== Weekly scores ==
Unless indicated otherwise, individual judges scores in the charts below (given in parentheses) are listed in this order from left to right: Craig Revel Horwood, Darcey Bussell, Len Goodman, Bruno Tonioli.

=== Week 1 ===
Six of the couples performed on the first night and the other eight performed on the second night. Couples performed either the cha-cha-cha or the waltz. There was no elimination this week; all scores and votes carried over to the following week. Couples are listed in the order they performed.

Night 1 (Friday)

Couple	Scores	Dance	Music
Fern & Artem	19 (4, 5, 5, 5)	Cha-cha-cha	"Signed, Sealed, Delivered I'm Yours" — Stevie Wonder
Nicky & Karen	17 (2, 5, 5, 5)	Waltz	"I Wonder Why" — Curtis Stigers
Victoria & Brendan	16 (3, 4, 5, 4)	Cha-cha-cha	"Spinning Around" — Kylie Minogue
Michael & Natalie	20 (5, 5, 6, 4)	Waltz	"If You Don't Know Me by Now" — Simply Red
Colin & Kristina	23 (4, 7, 6, 6)	Cha-cha-cha	"I Got You (I Feel Good)" — James Brown
Denise & James	25 (6, 6, 6, 7)	Waltz	"With You I'm Born Again" — Billy Preston & Syreeta Wright

Night 2 (Saturday)

Couple	Scores	Dance	Music
Kimberley & Pasha	28 (7, 7, 7, 7)	Cha-cha-cha	"Domino" — Jessie J
Sid & Ola	26 (6, 6, 7, 7)	Waltz	"I Won't Give Up" — Jason Mraz
Johnny & Iveta	17 (3, 5, 5, 4)	Cha-cha-cha	"Drive My Car" — The Beatles
Dani & Vincent	21 (5, 5, 6, 5)	Waltz	"Open Arms" — Mariah Carey
Lisa & Robin	30 (8, 8, 7, 7)	Cha-cha-cha	"Think" — Aretha Franklin
Richard & Erin	22 (5, 5, 7, 5)	Waltz	"You Don't Bring Me Flowers" — Barbra Streisand
Jerry & Anton	18 (3, 5, 5, 5)	Cha-cha-cha	"Everybody Loves to Cha Cha Cha" — Sam Cooke
Louis & Flavia	27 (6, 8, 6, 7)	Cha-cha-cha	"Forget You" — Cee Lo Green

=== Week 2 ===
Musical guest: Scissor Sisters — "Let's Have a Kiki"

Couples are listed in the order they performed.

Couple	Scores	Dance	Music	Result
Nicky & Karen	18 (4, 5, 4, 5)	Cha-cha-cha	"Dynamite" — Taio Cruz	Safe
Colin & Kristina	24 (6, 6, 6, 6)	Viennese waltz	"Kiss from a Rose" — Seal	Safe
Dani & Vincent	27 (7, 6, 7, 7)	Salsa	"Mama Do the Hump" — Rizzle Kicks	Safe
Fern & Artem	24 (6, 6, 6, 6)	Viennese waltz	"She's Always a Woman" — Billy Joel	Safe
Richard & Erin	19 (3, 6, 5, 5)	Cha-cha-cha	"Love Shack" — The B-52's	Bottom two
Victoria & Brendan	26 (6, 6, 7, 7)	Foxtrot	"Moondance" — Michael Bublé	Safe
Michael & Natalie	15 (2, 5, 4, 4)	Jive	"This Ole House" — Shakin' Stevens	Safe
Louis & Flavia	30 (7, 7, 8, 8)	Viennese waltz	"Puppy Love" — Donny Osmond	Safe
Denise & James	32 (8, 8, 8, 8)	Jive	"Tutti Frutti" — Little Richard	Safe
Johnny & Iveta	20 (5, 5, 5, 5)	Foxtrot	"Everything" — Michael Bublé	Eliminated
Sid & Ola	22 (6, 6, 5, 5)	Salsa	"Hips Don't Lie" — Shakira	Safe
Kimberley & Pasha	26 (7, 6, 6, 7)	Foxtrot	"Someone Like You" — Adele	Safe
Jerry & Anton	18 (3, 5, 5, 5)	Foxtrot	"Pennies from Heaven" — Frank Sinatra	Safe
Lisa & Robin	25 (7, 6, 6, 6)	Viennese waltz	"Never Tear Us Apart" — Paloma Faith	Safe

Judges' votes to save

- Horwood: Richard & Erin
- Bussell: Richard & Erin
- Tonioli: Richard & Erin
- Goodman: Did not vote, but would have voted to save Richard & Erin

=== Week 3: Hollywood Week ===
Musical guest: Dionne Warwick — "(There's) Always Something There to Remind Me"

Couples are listed in the order they performed.

Couple	Scores	Dance	Music	Film	Result
Fern & Artem	23 (5, 6, 6, 6)	Charleston	"Supercalifragilisticexpialidocious"	Mary Poppins	Safe
Victoria & Brendan	22 (4, 5, 7, 6)	Rumba	"Up Where We Belong"	An Officer and a Gentleman	Safe
Michael & Natalie	19 (3, 6, 6, 4)	Cha-cha-cha	"Hot Stuff"	The Full Monty	Bottom two
Jerry & Anton	18 (3, 6, 5, 4)	Quickstep	"Mrs. Robinson"	The Graduate	Eliminated
Sid & Ola	17 (4, 4, 5, 4)	Tango	"Here I Go Again"	Rock of Ages	Safe
Kimberley & Pasha	29 (7, 7, 7, 8)	Quickstep	"Get Happy"	Summer Stock	Safe
Denise & James	32 (8, 8, 8, 8)	Foxtrot	"You've Got a Friend in Me"	Toy Story	Safe
Colin & Kristina	26 (7, 7, 6, 6)	Argentine tango	"GoldenEye"	GoldenEye	Safe
Richard & Erin	25 (6, 7, 6, 6)	Quickstep	"9 to 5"	9 to 5	Safe
Dani & Vincent	29 (7, 6, 8, 8)	Foxtrot	"Over the Rainbow"	The Wizard of Oz	Safe
Lisa & Robin	29 (8, 6, 7, 8)	Jive	"Hanky Panky"	Dick Tracy	Safe
Nicky & Karen	27 (6, 7, 7, 7)	Quickstep	"Hey! Pachuco!"	The Mask	Safe
Louis & Flavia	30 (8, 8, 6, 8)	Salsa	"(I've Had) The Time of My Life"	Dirty Dancing	Safe

Judges' votes to save

- Horwood: Michael & Natalie
- Bussell: Michael & Natalie
- Tonioli: Jerry & Anton
- Goodman: Michael & Natalie

=== Week 4: Halloween Week ===
Musical guest: Paloma Faith — "Never Tear Us Apart"

Couples are listed in the order they performed.

Couple	Scores	Dance	Music	Result
Dani & Vincent	27 (6, 6, 8, 7)	Cha-cha-cha	"Scooby Doo, Where Are You" — Larry Markes	Safe
Richard & Erin	22 (5, 5, 7, 5)	Paso doble	"O Fortuna" — Carl Orff	Safe
Lisa & Robin	26 (6, 6, 7, 7)	Charleston	"Witch Doctor" — David Seville	Safe
Sid & Ola	17 (2, 5, 5, 5)	Cha-cha-cha	"Ghostbusters" — Ray Parker Jr.	Eliminated
Nicky & Karen	26 (6, 6, 7, 7)	Tango	"Weird Science" — Oingo Boingo	Safe
Fern & Artem	21 (4, 5, 6, 6)	American Smooth	"Killer Queen" — Queen	Safe
Denise & James	28 (7, 7, 7, 7)	Cha-cha-cha	"Super Freak" — Rick James	Safe
Michael & Natalie	31 (8, 8, 8, 7)	Quickstep	"That Old Black Magic" — Sammy Davis, Jr.	Safe
Victoria & Brendan	31 (7, 8, 8, 8)	Tango	"White Wedding" — Billy Idol	Safe
Colin & Kristina	24 (5, 7, 6, 6)	Salsa	"Superstition" — Stevie Wonder	Bottom two
Louis & Flavia	35 (8, 9, 9, 9)	Tango	"Disturbia" — Rihanna	Safe
Kimberley & Pasha	31 (8, 8, 7, 8)	Paso doble	"Hungry Like the Wolf" — Duran Duran	Safe

Judges' votes to save

- Horwood: Colin & Kristina
- Bussell: Colin & Kristina
- Tonioli: Colin & Kristina
- Goodman: Did not vote, but would have voted to save Sid & Ola

=== Week 5 ===
Musical guests:

- The Wanted — "I Found You"
- Andrea Bocelli — "Nessun dorma"

Couples are listed in the order they performed.

Couple	Scores	Dance	Music	Result
Kimberley & Pasha	33 (8, 8, 8, 9)	Salsa	"Naughty Girl" — Beyoncé	Safe
Lisa & Robin	27 (7, 7, 6, 7)	Tango	"Let's Stick Together" — Bryan Ferry	Safe
Richard & Erin	17 (3, 5, 5, 4)	Foxtrot	"Big Spender" — Shirley Bassey	Bottom two
Denise & James	35 (9, 8, 9, 9)	Viennese waltz	"At Last" — Etta James	Safe
Victoria & Brendan	23 (6, 6, 6, 5)	Samba	"It's Not Unusual" — Tom Jones	Safe
Louis & Flavia	29 (6, 7, 8, 8)	Samba	"La Bomba" — Ricky Martin	Safe
Colin & Kristina	27 (6, 7, 7, 7)	Foxtrot	"Ac-Cent-Tchu-Ate the Positive" — Aretha Franklin	Eliminated
Nicky & Karen	25 (4, 7, 7, 7)	Rumba	"I Don't Want to Miss a Thing" — Aerosmith	Safe
Fern & Artem	24 (6, 6, 6, 6)	Paso doble	"España cañí" — Pascual Marquina Narro	Safe
Michael & Natalie	31 (7, 8, 8, 8)	Foxtrot	"I Get the Sweetest Feeling" — Jackie Wilson	Safe
Dani & Vincent	33 (8, 8, 9, 8)	Jive	"Dance with Me Tonight" — Olly Murs	Safe

Judges' votes to save

- Horwood: Richard & Erin
- Bussell: Richard & Erin
- Tonioli: Richard & Erin
- Goodman: Did not vote, but would have voted to save Richard & Erin

=== Week 6 ===
Florence and The Machine — “Spectrum (Say My Name)”

Couples are listed in the order they performed.

Couple	Scores	Dance	Music	Result
Denise & James	36 (9, 9, 9, 9)	Paso doble	"Seven Nation Army" — The White Stripes	Safe
Richard & Erin	29 (7, 8, 7, 7)	Charleston	"Pencil Full of Lead" — Paolo Nutini	Safe
Louis & Flavia	33 (6, 9, 9, 9)	Waltz	"Moon River" — Andy Williams	Safe
Fern & Artem	27 (6, 7, 7, 7)	Salsa	"You'll Be Mine (Party Time)" — Gloria Estefan	Eliminated
Victoria & Brendan	30 (7, 7, 8, 8)	Quickstep	"Luck Be a Lady" — Frank Sinatra	Safe
Dani & Vincent	34 (8, 8, 9, 9)	Tango	"Rumour Has It" — Adele	Safe
Nicky & Karen	30 (7, 7, 8, 8)	Foxtrot	"The Best Is Yet to Come" — Michael Bublé	Safe
Kimberley & Pasha	34 (8, 8, 9, 9)	Viennese waltz	"A Thousand Years" — Christina Perri	Bottom two
Michael & Natalie	26 (5, 7, 7, 7)	Salsa	"I Want You Back" — The Jackson 5	Safe
Lisa & Robin	32 (8, 8, 8, 8)	Foxtrot	"This Will Be (An Everlasting Love)" — Natalie Cole	Safe

Judges' votes to save

- Horwood: Kimberley & Pasha
- Bussell: Kimberley & Pasha
- Tonioli: Kimberley & Pasha
- Goodman: Did not vote, but would have voted to save Kimberley & Pasha

=== Week 7: Wembley ===
- Girls Aloud — "Something New"

This week's show was broadcast live from Wembley Arena. Couples are listed in the order they performed.

Couple	Scores	Dance	Music	Result
Lisa & Robin	32 (8, 8, 8, 8)	Samba	"Car Wash" — Rose Royce	Safe
Nicky & Karen	30 (6, 8, 8, 8)	Jive	"Jailhouse Rock" — Elvis Presley	Bottom two
Denise & James	39 (9, 10, 10, 10)	Charleston	"Walk Like an Egyptian" — The Bangles	Safe
Louis & Flavia	30 (7, 8, 8, 7)	American Smooth	"I Got a Woman" — Ray Charles	Safe
Richard & Erin	24 (5, 6, 7, 6)	Salsa	"Club Tropicana" — Wham!	Eliminated
Victoria & Brendan	24 (5, 6, 7, 6)	Paso doble	"Bicycle Race" — Queen	Safe
Dani & Vincent	36 (9, 9, 9, 9)	Quickstep	"You Can't Hurry Love" — Phil Collins	Safe
Kimberley & Pasha	34 (8, 8, 9, 9)	Samba	"Livin' la Vida Loca" — Ricky Martin	Safe
Michael & Natalie	35 (9, 9, 9, 8)	American Smooth	"New York, New York" — Frank Sinatra	Safe

Judges' votes to save

- Horwood: Nicky & Karen
- Bussell: Nicky & Karen
- Tonioli: Nicky & Karen
- Goodman: Did not vote, but would have voted to save Nicky & Karen

=== Week 8 ===
Musical guest: The Script — “Hall of Fame”

Couples are listed in the order they performed.

Couple	Scores	Dance	Music	Result
Dani & Vincent	36 (9, 9, 9, 9)	Samba	"Single Ladies (Put a Ring on It)" — Beyoncé	Safe
Kimberley & Pasha	34 (8, 9, 8, 9)	Tango	"When Doves Cry" — Prince	Safe
Victoria & Brendan	21 (4, 6, 6, 5)	Salsa	"Candy" — Robbie Williams	Eliminated
Louis & Flavia	27 (6, 7, 7, 7)	Paso doble	"Dirty Diana" — Michael Jackson	Safe
Lisa & Robin	27 (7, 6, 7, 7)	Rumba	"As If We Never Said Goodbye" — Barbra Streisand	Safe
Michael & Natalie	26 (6, 7, 7, 6)	Argentine tango	"Bust Your Windows" — Jazmine Sullivan	Bottom two
Nicky & Karen	36 (9, 9, 9, 9)	Charleston	"Doop" — Doop	Safe
Denise & James	37 (9, 9, 9, 10)	American Smooth	"Imagine" — Eva Cassidy	Safe

Judges' votes to save

- Horwood: Michael & Natalie
- Bussell: Michael & Natalie
- Tonioli: Michael & Natalie
- Goodman: Did not vote, but would have voted to save Michael & Natalie

=== Week 9 ===
Musical guests:

- JLS — "Hold Me Down"
- Alfie Boe — "Bridge over Troubled Water"

Couples are listed in the order they performed.

Couple	Scores	Dance	Music	Result
Kimberley & Pasha	34 (9, 8, 8, 9)	Jive	"Land of a Thousand Dances" — Wilson Pickett	Safe
Dani & Vincent	34 (8, 8, 9, 9)	Viennese waltz	"That's Amore" — Dean Martin	Safe
Michael & Natalie	24 (5, 7, 6, 6)	Samba	"Tequila" — The Champs	Eliminated
Nicky & Karen	30 (7, 8, 7, 8)	Argentine tango	"Skyfall" — Adele	Bottom two
Lisa & Robin	31 (7, 8, 8, 8)	Quickstep	"Bring Me Sunshine" — The Jive Aces	Safe
Denise & James	32 (8, 8, 8, 8)	Salsa	"Rhythm of the Night" — Valeria	Safe
Louis & Flavia	37 (8, 10, 9, 10)	Charleston	"Dr. Wanna Do" — Caro Emerald	Safe

Judges' votes to save

- Horwood: Nicky & Karen
- Bussell: Nicky & Karen
- Tonioli: Nicky & Karen
- Goodman: Did not vote, but would have voted to save Nicky & Karen

=== Week 10: Dance Fusion Week (Quarter-final) ===
Musical guest: Michael Bublé — "It's Beginning to Look a Lot Like Christmas"

Each couple performed one routine that demonstrated a fusion of two distinct dance styles. Couples are listed in the order they performed.

Couple	Scores	Dance	Music	Result
Denise & James	35 (8, 9, 9, 9)	Jive & Quickstep	"Reet Petite" — Jackie Wilson	Bottom two
Lisa & Robin	30 (7, 8, 7, 8)	Cha-cha-cha & Tango	"Voulez-Vous" — ABBA	Safe
Nicky & Karen	27 (5, 7, 8, 7)	American Smooth & Samba	"Troublemaker" — Olly Murs	Eliminated
Dani & Vincent	38 (9, 10, 9, 10)	Charleston & Quickstep	"Happy Feet" — from King of Jazz	Safe
Louis & Flavia	37 (9, 9, 9, 10)	Rumba & Tango	"With or Without You" — U2	Safe
Kimberley & Pasha	40 (10, 10, 10, 10)	Cha-cha-cha & Tango	"It's Raining Men" — The Weather Girls	Safe

Judges' votes to save

- Horwood: Denise & James
- Bussell: Denise & James
- Tonioli: Denise & James
- Goodman: Did not vote, but would have voted to save Denise & James

=== Week 11: Semi-final ===
Musical guest: Katherine Jenkins — "Santa Baby"

Dance guests: Katherine Jenkins & Mark Ballas

Each couple performed two routines, and are listed in the order they performed.

Couple	Scores	Dance	Music	Result
Dani & Vincent	34 (8, 8, 9, 9)	American Smooth	"Haven't Met You Yet" — Michael Bublé	Safe
Dani & Vincent	38 (9, 9, 10, 10)	Argentine tango	"Libertango" — Astor Piazzolla	Safe
Louis & Flavia	31 (7, 8, 8, 8)	Jive	"Why Do Fools Fall in Love" — Frankie Lymon & The Teenagers	Safe
Louis & Flavia	38 (9, 10, 9, 10)	Foxtrot	"Somebody That I Used to Know" — Gotye	Safe
Denise & James	39 (9, 10, 10, 10)	Tango	"Roxanne" — The Police	Bottom two
Denise & James	38 (9, 9, 10, 10)	Rumba	"The First Time Ever I Saw Your Face" — Roberta Flack	Bottom two
Kimberley & Pasha	38 (9, 10, 9, 10)	American Smooth	"Fever" — Peggy Lee	Safe
Kimberley & Pasha	40 (10, 10, 10, 10)	Charleston	"Those Magnificent Men in Their Flying Machines" — Ron Goodwin	Safe
Lisa & Robin	31 (7, 8, 8, 8)	Salsa	"Best Years of Our Lives" — Modern Romance	Eliminated
Lisa & Robin	32 (8, 8, 8, 8)	American Smooth	"All That Jazz" — from Chicago	Eliminated

Judges' votes to save

- Horwood: Denise & James
- Bussell: Denise & James
- Tonioli: Denise & James
- Goodman: Did not vote, but would have voted to save Denise & James

=== Week 12: Final ===
Musical guest: Robbie Williams — "Different"

During the first show, each couple performed two routines, one of which was their showdance routine and the other chosen by the judges. At the end of the first show, the couple was the lowest combined scores was eliminated. During the second show, each couple performed their favourite dance of the series. Couples are listed in the order they performed.

==== Show 1 ====
Couple	Scores	Dance	Music	Result
Denise & James	39 (9, 10, 10, 10)	Jive	"Tutti Frutti" — Little Richard	Safe
Denise & James	40 (10, 10, 10, 10)	Showdance	"Flashdance... What a Feeling" — Irene Cara	Safe
Dani & Vincent	36 (9, 9, 9, 9)	Tango	"Rumour Has It" — Adele	Fourth place
Dani & Vincent	35 (8, 9, 9, 9)	Showdance	"Bohemian Rhapsody" — Queen	Fourth place
Kimberley & Pasha	39 (9, 10, 10, 10)	Viennese waltz	"A Thousand Years" — Christina Perri	Safe
Kimberley & Pasha	39 (9, 10, 10, 10)	Showdance	"Crazy in Love" — Beyoncé	Safe
Louis & Flavia	39 (9, 10, 10, 10)	Salsa	"(I've Had) The Time of My Life" — from Dirty Dancing	Safe
Louis & Flavia	40 (10, 10, 10, 10)	Showdance	"Rule the World" — Take That	Safe

==== Show 2 ====
Couple	Scores	Dance	Music	Result
Denise & James	40 (10, 10, 10, 10)	Charleston	"Walk Like an Egyptian" — The Puppini Sisters	Runners-up
Kimberley & Pasha	40 (10, 10, 10, 10)	Tango	"When Doves Cry" — Prince	Runners-up
Louis & Flavia	39 (9, 10, 10, 10)	Charleston	"Dr. Wanna Do" — Caro Emerald	Winners

== Dance chart ==
The couples performed the following each week:

- Week 1: One unlearned dance (cha-cha-cha or waltz)
- Weeks 2–9: One unlearned dance
- Week 10: One fusion dance
- Week 11: Two unlearned dances
- Week 12 (Show 1): Judges' choice & showdance
- Week 12 (Show 2): Favourite dance of the series

Strictly Come Dancing (series 10) – Dance chart
Couple	Week														
Couple	1	2	3	4	5	6	7	8	9	10	11		12		
Louis & Flavia	Cha-cha-cha	Viennese waltz	Salsa	Tango	Samba	Waltz	American Smooth	Paso doble	Charleston	Rumba & Tango	Jive	Foxtrot	Salsa	Showdance	Charleston
Denise & James	Waltz	Jive	Foxtrot	Cha-cha-cha	Viennese waltz	Paso doble	Charleston	American Smooth	Salsa	Jive & Quickstep	Tango	Rumba	Jive	Showdance	Charleston
Kimberley & Pasha	Cha-cha-cha	Foxtrot	Quickstep	Paso doble	Salsa	Viennese waltz	Samba	Tango	Jive	Cha-cha-cha & Tango	American Smooth	Charleston	Viennese waltz	Showdance	Tango
Dani & Vincent	Waltz	Salsa	Foxtrot	Cha-cha-cha	Jive	Tango	Quickstep	Samba	Viennese waltz	Charleston & Quickstep	American Smooth	Argentine tango	Tango	Showdance	
Lisa & Robin	Cha-cha-cha	Viennese waltz	Jive	Charleston	Tango	Foxtrot	Samba	Rumba	Quickstep	Cha-cha-cha & Tango	Salsa	American Smooth			
Nicky & Karen	Waltz	Cha-cha-cha	Quickstep	Tango	Rumba	Foxtrot	Jive	Charleston	Argentine tango	American Smooth & Samba					
Michael & Natalie	Waltz	Jive	Cha-cha-cha	Quickstep	Foxtrot	Salsa	American Smooth	Argentine tango	Samba						
Victoria & Brendan	Cha-cha-cha	Foxtrot	Rumba	Tango	Samba	Quickstep	Paso doble	Salsa							
Richard & Erin	Waltz	Cha-cha-cha	Quickstep	Paso doble	Foxtrot	Charleston	Salsa								
Fern & Artem	Cha-cha-cha	Viennese waltz	Charleston	American Smooth	Paso doble	Salsa									
Colin & Kristina	Cha-cha-cha	Viennese waltz	Argentine tango	Salsa	Foxtrot										
Sid & Ola	Waltz	Salsa	Tango	Cha-cha-cha											
Jerry & Anton	Cha-cha-cha	Foxtrot	Quickstep												
Johnny & Iveta	Cha-cha-cha	Foxtrot													

== Ratings ==
Weekly ratings for each show on BBC One. All ratings are provided by BARB.

Episode	Date	Official rating (millions)	Weekly rank for BBC One	Weekly rank for all UK TV	Share
Launch show	15 September	8.96	1	3	40.2%
Week 1 (Night 1)	5 October	9.22	2	3	34.0%
Week 1 (Night 2)	6 October	9.97	1	2	40.7%
Week 2	13 October	10.83	1	1	43.5%
Week 2 results	14 October	8.53	2	6	32.5%
Week 3	20 October	10.97	1	1	44.2%
Week 3 results	21 October	9.70	2	3	36.6%
Week 4	27 October	10.59	1	1	43.5%
Week 4 results	28 October	9.79	2	3	36.4%
Week 5	3 November	10.95	1	1	43.7%
Week 5 results	4 November	9.94	2	3	37.4%
Week 6	10 November	11.38	1	1	42.6%
Week 6 results	11 November	10.90	2	2	40.7%
Week 7	17 November	11.41	1	1	43.9%
Week 7 results	18 November	10.47	2	2	36.2%
Week 8	24 November	11.19	1	1	42.3%
Week 8 results	25 November	10.45	2	2	39.0%
Week 9	1 December	10.93	1	1	41.7%
Week 9 results	2 December	9.81	2	2	34.0%
Week 10	8 December	12.04	1	1	45.3%
Week 10 results	9 December	10.54	2	2	37.7%
Week 11	15 December	11.52	1	1	43.8%
Week 11 results	16 December	11.40	2	2	42.5%
Week 12	22 December	13.37	1	1	49.1%
Week 12 results	22 December	13.35	2	2	46.4%
Series average (excl. launch show)	2012	10.80	—N/a	—N/a	40.7%
