= Erin Boag =

Professional ballroom dancer

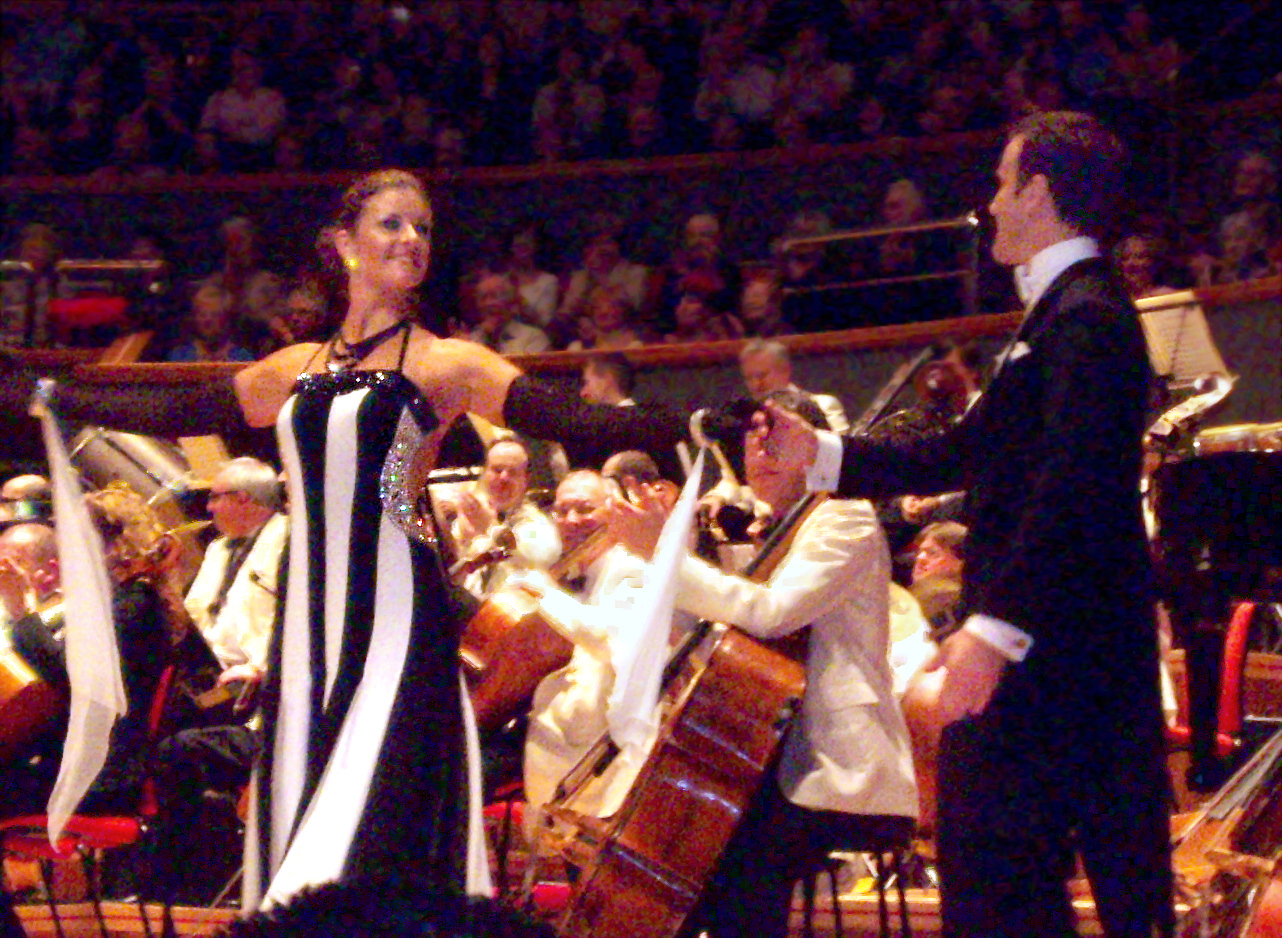
- Boag and Anton Du Beke at the Symphony Hall, Birmingham, January 2008
- Born: 17 March 1975 (age 51); Auckland, New Zealand
- Occupation: Professional ballroom dancer
- Known for: Strictly Come Dancing (2004—12)
- Spouse: Peter O'Dowd (m. 2009)

Erin Boag (born 17 March 1975) is a professional ballroom dancer. She has danced from the age of three, originally starting ballet and later moving into ballroom, Latin and jazz. Born in Auckland, New Zealand, she moved to Australia as a teenager to progress her dancing career, before moving to London in 1996.

She started professionally dancing and appeared on Strictly Come Dancing in the UK with her partner Anton Du Beke.

== Professional career ==
Boag's regular professional partner is Anton du Beke. They met in 1997, and won the 1998 and 1999 New Zealand Championships. They turned professional in 2002, competing mainly in the United Kingdom. Their best result on the competition circuit was in November 2003 when they won the IDTA Classic in Brighton. They appeared on the first 10 series of Strictly Come Dancing. Boag has not appeared as a professional on Strictly Come Dancing since Series 10, although du Beke still appears on the show. She made a brief cameo in 2015, giving advice to contestant Katie Derham, who was partnered with du Beke that year.

== Strictly Come Dancing ==
=== Highest- and lowest-scoring performances per dance ===
Dance	Partner	Highest	Partner	Lowest
American Smooth	Colin Jackson	37	Ricky Groves	29
Cha Cha Cha	Austin Healey	35	Julian Clary; Richard Arnold	19
Charleston	Richard Arnold	29	Peter Shilton	17
Foxtrot	Austin Healey	36	Richard Arnold	17
Jive	Austin Healey	34	Julian Clary; Martin Offiah	21
Paso Doble	Austin Healey	38	Peter Schmeichel	19
Quickstep	Colin Jackson	39	Richard Arnold	25
Rumba	Colin Jackson	36	Martin Offiah	21
Salsa	Austin Healey	36	Peter Shilton	17
Samba	Austin Healey; Colin Jackson	32	Peter Schmeichel	19
Tango	Austin Healey	38	Ricky Groves	22
Viennese Waltz	Austin Healey; Colin Jackson	34	Peter Schmeichel	28
Waltz	Colin Jackson	37	Peter Shilton; Ricky Groves	21

From 2004 to 2012, Boag competed as one of the professional partners in ten series and six Christmas specials of the BBC celebrity ballroom competition show, Strictly Come Dancing.

In the show's first series, Boag was partnered up with former England rugby league player, Martin Offiah. They were eliminated in week six of the competition, finishing in fourth place.

In the show's second series, Boag was partnered up with comedian, Julian Clary. They reached the finals of the competition, but were eliminated in third place.

In the show's third series, Boag was partnered up with former Olympic athlete, Colin Jackson. They also reached the finals of the competition, but were named the runners-up to cricketer Darren Gough and his professional partner, Lilia Kopylova. She and Jackson later competed in the 2005 Christmas special, where they finished in fifth place.

In the show's fourth series, Boag was partnered up with former Danish professional footballer, Peter Schmeichel. They were eliminated on the seventh week of the competition, finishing in seventh place. She later reunited with Jackson to compete in the 2006 Christmas special, and were voted the winners of the competition.

In the show's fifth series, Boag was partnered up with former professional snooker player, Willie Thorne. They were eliminated on the second week of the competition, finishing in thirteenth place.

In the show's sixth series, Boag was partnered up with former England rugby union player, Austin Healey. They reached the quarter-finals of the competition, but were eliminated in fourth place.

In the show's seventh series, Boag was partnered up with former EastEnders actor, Ricky Groves. They were eliminated in week ten of the competition, finishing in sixth place. She later participated in the 2009 Christmas special, where she was partnered with her former celebrity partner Austin Healey. They finished the Christmas special in joint-fifth place, alongside Ricky Whittle and his professional partner, Natalie Lowe.

In the show's eighth series, Boag was partnered up with former England professional footballer, Peter Shilton. They were eliminated in week four of the competition, finishing in twelfth place. She later participated in the 2010 Christmas special, where she was partnered with Liberal Democrats politician, Vince Cable. They finished the Christmas special in second place, losing to actor John Barrowman and his professional partner, Kristina Rihanoff.

In the show's ninth series, Boag was partnered up with comedian and impressionist, Rory Bremner. They became the third couple to be eliminated from the competition, finishing in twelfth place. She later competed in the 2011 Christmas special, where she was partnered with former professional boxer, Barry McGuigan. They finished the Christmas special in joint-second place, alongside Simon Webbe and his professional partner, Katya Virshilas.

In the show's tenth series, Boag was partnered up with television presenter, Richard Arnold. They became the sixth couple to be eliminated from the competition, finishing in ninth place. The tenth series was her final series before being replaced by Janette Manrara in the eleventh series.

Series	Celebrity partner	Place	Average Score
1	Martin Offiah	4th	23.0
2	Julian Clary	3rd	24.5
3	Colin Jackson	2nd	33.7
4	Peter Schmeichel	7th	24.7
5	Willie Thorne	12th	23.5
6	Austin Healey	4th	34.5
7	Ricky Groves	6th	25.8
8	Peter Shilton	12th	20.3
9	Rory Bremner	12th	26.0
10	Richard Arnold	9th	22.6

Series 1 - with celebrity partner Martin Offiah; placed 4th

Week #	Dance / Song	Judges' scores				Total	Result
Week #	Dance / Song	Horwood	Phillips	Goodman	Tonioli	Total	Result
1	Waltz / "Come Away with Me"	5	6	7	7	25	No elimination
2	Rumba / "Hero"	3	5	7	6	21	Safe
3	Jive / "Great Balls of Fire"	5	5	5	6	21	Safe
4	Foxtrot / "Let There Be Love"	6	5	7	6	24	Safe
5	Samba / "Crickets Sing for Anamaria"	5	5	6	6	22	Safe
6	Quickstep / "It Don't Mean a Thing (If It Ain't Got That Swing)"; Cha-Cha-Cha / "Smooth"	5; 6	6; 6	6; 6	7; 6	24; 24	Eliminated

Series 2 - with celebrity partner Julian Clary; placed 3rd

Week #	Dance / Song	Judges' scores				Total	Result
Week #	Dance / Song	Horwood	Phillips	Goodman	Tonioli	Total	Result
1	Cha-Cha-Cha / "I'm Outta Love"	4	4	5	6	19	Safe
2	Quickstep / "Diamonds Are a Girl's Best Friend"	6	7	7	7	27	Safe
3	Tango / "Roxanne"	6	7	7	7	27	Safe
4	Paso Doble / "Les Toreadors"	4	5	6	5	20	Safe
5	Samba / "Conga"	5	5	7	7	24	Bottom two
6	Waltz / "You Light Up My Life"; Rumba / "You're Still the One"	7; 6	7; 7	7; 7	7; 7	28; 27	Bottom two
7	Foxtrot / "Fever"; Jive / "Wake Me Up Before You Go-Go"	5; 4	5; 3	8; 7	6; 7	24; 21	Safe
8	Quickstep / "Diamonds Are a Girl's Best Friend"; Samba / "Conga"	7; 5	7; 5	8; 7	7; 6	29; 23	Third place

Series 3 - with celebrity partner Colin Jackson; placed 2nd

Week #	Dance / Song	Judges' scores				Total	Result
Week #	Dance / Song	Horwood	Phillips	Goodman	Tonioli	Total	Result
1	Cha-Cha-Cha / "Save the Last Dance for Me"	8	8	8	8	32	Safe
2	Quickstep / "Nice Work If You Can Get It"	9	9	9	9	36	Safe
3	Tango / "Ride It"	7	5	7	7	26	Safe
4	Paso Doble / "Thriller"	8	7	8	8	31	Safe
5	Samba / "Naughty Girl"	8	8	8	8	32	Safe
6	Foxtrot / "New York, New York"	8	8	8	8	32	Safe
7	Viennese Waltz / "Stop!"	9	9	8	8	34	Safe
8	Rumba / "You're Beautiful"; American Smooth / "Me & My Shadow"	9; 9	9; 10	9; 9	9; 9	36; 37	Safe
9	Waltz / "I Will Always Love You"; Jive / "Footloose"	9; 7	9; 7	10; 8	9; 8	37; 30	Safe
10	Quickstep / "Nice Work If You Can Get It"; Rumba / "You're Beautiful"	9; 9	10; 9	10; 9	10; 9	39; 36	Runners-up

Series 4 - with celebrity partner Peter Schmeichel; placed 7th

Week #	Dance / Song	Judges' scores				Total	Result
Week #	Dance / Song	Horwood	Phillips	Goodman	Tonioli	Total	Result
1	Waltz / "The Greatest Love of All"	6	5	7	7	25	Safe
3	Tango / "Tango Notturno"	6	8	9	8	31	Safe
4	Paso Doble / "Mission Impossible Theme"	2	5	6	6	19	Safe
5	Viennese Waltz / "Have You Ever Really Loved a Woman?"	6	7	8	7	28	Safe
6	Samba / "Use It Up and Wear It Out"	3	4	6	6	19	Safe
7	Foxtrot / "Something's Gotta Give"	6	6	7	7	26	Eliminated

Series 5 - with celebrity partner Willie Thorne; placed 13th

Week #	Dance / Song	Judges' scores				Total	Result
Week #	Dance / Song	Horwood	Phillips	Goodman	Tonioli	Total	Result
1	Waltz / "Run to You"	5	5	7	7	24	Safe
3	Tango / "Obertura"	5	6	6	6	23	Eliminated

Series 6 - with celebrity partner Austin Healey; placed 4th

Week #	Dance / Song	Judges' scores				Total	Result
Week #	Dance / Song	Horwood	Phillips	Goodman	Tonioli	Total	Result
1	Waltz / "The Rainbow Connection"	7	8	9	8	32	Safe
3	Jive / "You Can't Stop the Beat"	8	8	9	9	34	Safe
5	Samba / "Move Your Feet"	8	8	9	8	33	Safe
6	Viennese Waltz / "Send In the Clowns"	8	8	9	9	34	Safe
7	Quickstep / "S'Wonderful"	8	9	10	9	36	Safe
8	Rumba / "When You Tell Me That You Love Me"	5	8	7	8	28	Safe
9	Tango / "Libertango"	9	9	10	10	38	Safe
10	Cha-Cha-Cha / "It's Raining Men"	8	9	9	9	35	Safe
11	Foxtrot / "L-O-V-E"; Paso Doble / "España cañí"	8; 10	9; 10	9; 8	10; 10	36; 38	Safe
12	American Smooth / "The Best Is Yet to Come"; Salsa / "Johnny's Mambo"	8; 8	8; 9	9; 10	9; 9	34; 36	Eliminated

Series 7 - with celebrity partner Ricky Groves; placed 6th

Week #	Dance / Song	Judges' scores				Total	Result
Week #	Dance / Song	Horwood	Goodman	Dixon	Tonioli	Total	Result
1	Waltz / "What'll I Do"; Cha-Cha-Cha / "Jump (for My Love)"	4; 6	6; 7	6; 7	5; 6	21; 26	Safe
3	Paso Doble / "One Vision"	7	7	8	7	29	Safe
4	Foxtrot / "All of Me"	6	8	7	7	28	Safe
5	Jive / "The Boy from New York City"	6	7	7	5	25	Safe
6	American Smooth / "Chim Chim Cher-ee"	7	8	7	7	29	Safe
7	Rumba / "Licence to Kill"	4	8	7	5	24	Safe
8	Salsa / "Acuyuye"	6	7	6	6	25	Bottom two
9	Viennese Waltz / "Nights in White Satin"	7	8	7	7	29	Bottom two
10	Tango / "U Got The Look"	5	6	6	5	22	Eliminated

Series 8 - with celebrity partner Peter Shilton; placed 12th

Week #	Dance / Song	Judges' scores				Total	Result
Week #	Dance / Song	Horwood	Goodman	Dixon	Tonioli	Total	Result
1	Waltz / "Take It to the Limit"	4	6	6	5	21	No elimination
2	Salsa / "Mambo No. 5"	3	5	5	4	17	Bottom two
3	Quickstep / "Lullaby of Broadway"	6	7	7	6	26	Safe
4	Charleston / "Cabaret"	2	5	6	4	17	Eliminated

Series 9 - with celebrity partner Rory Bremner; placed 12th

Week #	Dance / Song	Judges' scores				Total	Result
Week #	Dance / Song	Horwood	Goodman	Dixon	Tonioli	Total	Result
1	Waltz / "Weekend in New England"	6	7	7	7	27	No elimination
3	Salsa / "Vehicle"	4	6	6	6	22	Safe
3	Quickstep / "Top Hat, White Tie and Tails"	7	8	8	8	31	Safe
4	Cha-Cha-Cha / "Dance to the Music	4	7	6	7	24	Eliminated

Series 10 - with celebrity partner Richard Arnold; placed 9th

Week #	Dance / Song	Judges' scores				Total	Result
Week #	Dance / Song	Horwood	Bussell	Goodman	Tonioli	Total	Result
1	Waltz / "You Don't Bring Me Flowers"	5	5	7	5	22	Safe
2	Cha-Cha-Cha / "Love Shack"	3	6	5	5	19	Bottom two
3	Quickstep / "9 to 5"	6	7	6	6	25	Safe
4	Paso Doble / "O Fortuna"	5	5	7	5	22	Safe
5	Foxtrot / "Big Spender"	3	5	5	4	17	Bottom two
6	Charleston / "Pencil Full of Lead"	7	8	7	7	29	Safe
7	Salsa / "Club Tropicana"	5	6	7	6	24	Eliminated

== Personal life ==
After they were introduced by Camilla Dallerup, Boag became engaged to business consultant Peter O'Dowd on Christmas Eve 2007. The couple were married on 17 June 2009, in Italy. On 24 April 2014, Boag gave birth by emergency caesarean section to a baby boy, named Ewan Robert Geoffrey O'Dowd. He was born on his father's 50th birthday; Boag's professional dancing partner Anton du Beke is the child's godfather.
