= Mark Heyes =

British fashion presenter (born 1977)

- Born: 29 January 1977 (age 49)
- Occupations: Fashion stylist television presenter
- Known for: GMTV, Lorraine

Mark Heyes (born 29 January 1977) is a British fashion journalist, fashion presenter, writer and broadcaster who is known for his appearances on Lorraine. He graduated from the Glasgow School of Art with a BA (Hons) degree in design, and broke through on Channel 4's She's Gotta Have It as an on-screen and behind the scenes stylist. In 2009, The Guardian listed him in their Top 100 Most Influential People in the Fashion Industry.
