= 3@Three =

- Presented by: Fiona Phillips; Kelvin MacKenzie; Gloria Hunniford; Carol Smillie; Penny Smith; Mark Durden-Smith; Andrea McLean; Jeremy Kyle
- Country of origin: United Kingdom
- Original language: English
- No. of series: 1
- No. of episodes: 10

Production
- Executive producer: Karl Newton
- Running time: 60 minutes (inc. adverts)
- Production company: ITV Studios

Original release
- Network: ITV
- Release: 2 August – 13 August 2010

3@Three was a topical TV live debate show on ITV. In the programme three topics are discussed each day at three o'clock by three rotating panellists. The first series of ten episodes aired on Monday-Friday between 2 and 13 August 2010. The show has not returned since. The show was created by Karl Newton and Alison Sharman, the duo responsible for Loose Women.

== The panel ==
The panel featured on the show consisted of Fiona Phillips, Kelvin MacKenzie, Gloria Hunniford, Carol Smillie, Penny Smith, Mark Durden-Smith, Andrea McLean and Jeremy Kyle .

== Format ==
Each day, the show debated three topical issues with each of the three guest presenters adopting an opinionated point of view on the topic. The studio audience were invited to press a handset to indicate their level of approval for each presenter's stance in the debate which appeared as an on-screen graphic with a "sausage" indicating the support for each guest's point of view. A panel of "Skypers" using web cams appeared on a video wall providing their points of view to add to that of the panel. Audience members and additional guests were also sometimes invited to add to the debate. The three presenters initially sat at a desk but then moved to a more informal sofa area for the next topic and alternate between the two sets.

The show was filmed at The Hospital Club Studios, part of an entertainment complex and club in Covent Garden, Central London.

== Transmissions ==
Series	Episodes	Originally released	
Series	Episodes	First released	Last released
1	10	2 August 2010	13 August 2010
