= Penny Smith =

English television and radio presenter

- Born: Penelope Jane Smith; 21 September 1958 (age 67); Eastwood, Nottinghamshire, England,
- Occupations: Newsreader, television presenter
- Notable credit(s): Sky News; GMTV (1993–2010); BBC London 94.9 (2013–2015)
- Spouse: Tony Birtley (1984–1987; divorced)
- Website: penny-smith.co.uk

Penelope Jane Smith (born 21 September 1958) is an English television presenter, radio presenter and author. She has presented for Sky News, GMTV, GB News, Classic FM, BBC Radio London, Talkradio and Magic Classical.

== Early life and education ==
Smith was born in Eastwood, Nottinghamshire, and grew up in Rutland. She attended Uppingham Primary School in Uppingham and the Rutland High School for Girls (later Rutland College) in Oakham.

== Television and radio ==
Smith began her career as a reporter and feature writer on the Peterborough Evening Telegraph in 1977. After four years, she left to backpack through Central and South America and South East Asia where she reported and presented on a current affairs programme for Radio Television Hong Kong. In 1984 she joined Radio Trent as a reporter/presenter and then worked for Central Television as press officer for documentaries and drama.

After that, Smith co-presented Lookaround, the local evening news for Border Television and in 1987 she joined Thames Television to co-present Thames News with Andrew Gardner. Smith left the station toward the end of 1988 to help launch Sky News in February 1989. In April 1993, she joined GMTV where she stayed until 4 June 2010.

Smith has also presented Crime Net, Crime File and Crime Fighters for Carlton, Crime Monthly and Britain's Most Wanted for LWT, Going for a Song for the BBC and Celebrity for ITV. She also co-presented the 1995 series of The Krypton Factor alongside Gordon Burns.

In 2006, Smith appeared in the BBC One show Just the Two of Us. She sang with Curtis Stigers and was eliminated on 3 March. She came fourth. She later appeared on Never Mind the Buzzcocks in 2006 and several episodes of Have I Got News for You.

Smith has also covered the Friday Night Arts Show on BBC Radio 2 when Claudia Winkleman was away.

From January 2013 to January 2016, Smith co-presented the weekday breakfast show on BBC London 94.9.

Smith joined digital radio station Talkradio in 2016 presenting her first show on 26 March 2016. She presented the weekend breakfast show until February 2021.

From March 2021, she began presenting the weekday drivetime show on Scala Radio.

From September 2024, Smith presented the mid-morning programme on Magic Classical – a rebranding of Scala Radio. Her last broadcast was on 2 May 2025. She was, at the time, the only regular daytime presenter on the station, along with Charles Nove.

Smith joined Eamonn Holmes on GB News breakfast to cover for Ellie Costello in August 2025. Smith also covers weekend breakfast for Anne Diamond alongside Stephen Dixon.

=== GMTV ===
1993 – 2009

On 19 April 1993, Smith began her career on GMTV as the show's main newsreader, as well as becoming the main presenter of the Reuters News Hour alongside Anne Davies, Matthew Lorenzo and Ross Kelly. In 1998, John Stapleton joined GMTV and then joined Smith as her co-presenter of the Reuters News Hour. In 2000, GMTV rebranded all of their programmes. With the loss of Matt Lorenzo and Ross Kelly, Smith and John Stapleton became the main presenters of the GMTV Newshour, as well as becoming the main newsreaders and relief presenters for GMTV Today.

2009 – 2010

In 2009, GMTV had another relaunch, with all of their programmes rebranding and new studio. This meant that the GMTV Newshour and GMTV Today became GMTV, with Smith and Stapleton presenting the first hour of the show. Smith continued to be the main newsreader of GMTV.

On 3 March 2010, it had emerged from Smith's Twitter account that she had decided to leave the programme after 17 years. This was said to be part of a cost-cutting exercise by ITV. On 4 June 2010, Smith presented her last show.

== Other work ==
Smith has written for a number of national newspapers and magazines, including a beauty column for "Femail" in the Daily Mail and articles in Essentials magazine, Good Housekeeping, and Woman and Home.

Smith has produced three yoga videos: Penny Smith's Power Yoga, Penny Smith's Essential Guide to Yoga presented alongside Howard Napper and Penny Smith's Yoga Masterclass.

== Personal life ==
Smith married journalist Tony Birtley on Saturday 12 May 1983 at St Wulfram's Church, Grantham, the reception was held in Colsterworth; the best man was Daily Star reporter George Dearsley. The couple moved to Nassington in north-east Northamptonshire, where they were married for four years; they divorced in 1987. Her parents Graham and Christine, who married in 1955, lived in Colsterworth in the 1980s; her father had an engineering business in Grantham, later moving to Cyprus in the late 1980s.

She counts Rory Bremner and Paul McKenna amongst her ex-boyfriends. Since September 2001, Smith has been in a long term relationship with the actor Vince Leigh.

Smith lives in Notting Hill, West London.

== Bibliography ==
- Coming Up Next (2008)
- After the Break (2009)

=== Articles ===
- Smith, Penny (4 October 2008). "Diary". The Spectator. 308 (9317): 9. Archived from the original on 22 November 2008.
