= Fiona Phillips =

English journalist and TV presenter (born 1961)

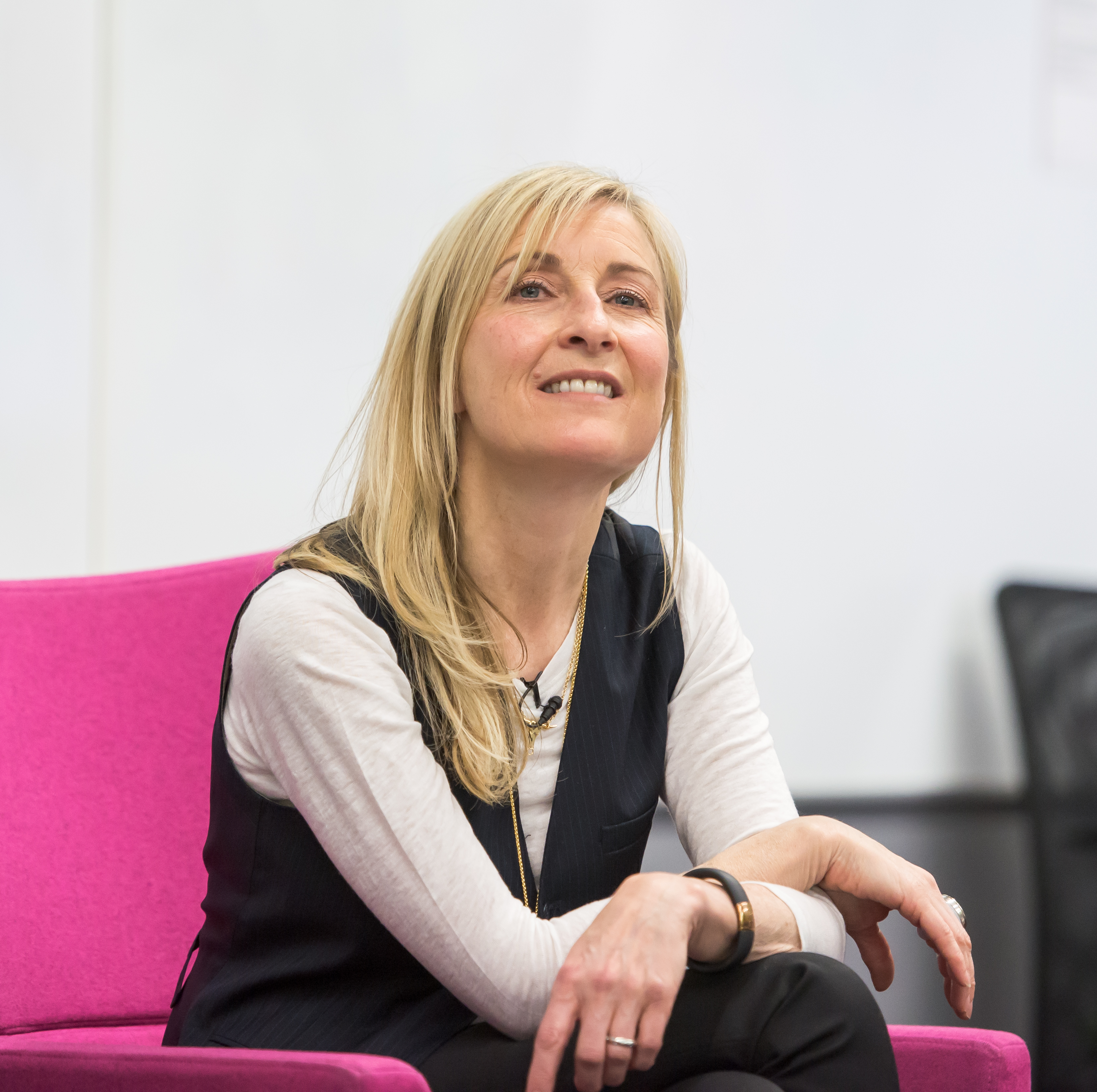
- Phillips in 2015
- Born: 1 January 1961 (age 65); Canterbury, Kent, England
- Education: Birmingham City University
- Occupations: Television broadcaster; journalist; presenter
- Employer: ITV (former)
- Spouse: Martin Frizell (m. 1997)
- Children: 2

Fiona Phillips (born 1 January 1961) is a British retired journalist and broadcaster. She is best known for presenting the ITV Breakfast programme GMTV Today.

== Early life ==
Phillips was born in Kent and Canterbury Hospital in Canterbury, Kent, the daughter of Phillip (died February 2012) and Amy (died May 2006). She has two younger brothers. Her grandparents ran the Duke's Head pub on Church Street in St Paul's. Phillips attended Kingsmead Primary School.

The family later moved to Maybush, Southampton, and Phillips attended Aldermoor Middle School and Millbrook Community School. After leaving school, Phillips worked for a short time at Mr Kipling's Bakery in Eastleigh, near Southampton. Phillips graduated from Birmingham Polytechnic with a BA (Hons) degree in English; she also undertook a PGCert in journalism.

== Career ==
=== Early career ===
Phillips started her career in independent radio working as a reporter for local stations County Sound in Surrey, Hereward Radio and Radio Mercury in Sussex.

Moving from radio to television several years later, she joined BBC South East's Weekend programme as co-presenter, before becoming a reporter with CNN News, later moving on to become the station's entertainment editor, producing, reporting and presenting CNN News' entertainment output.

=== Television ===
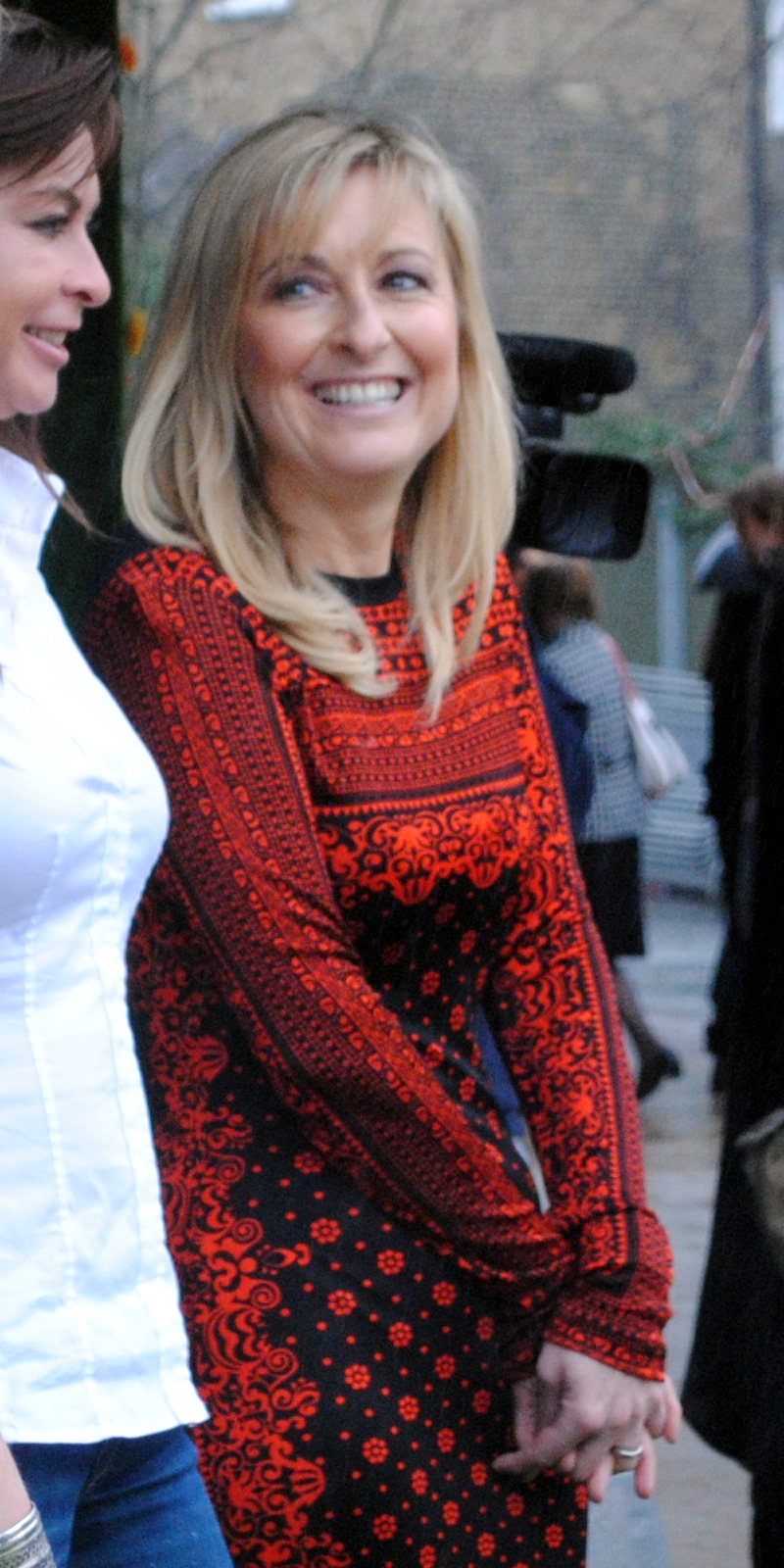
Phillips in 2010

Phillips has presented other programmes, including the celebrity lifestyle show OK! TV, Baby House and Room to Rent, Carlton's entertainment guide Good Stuff, LWT's Friday evening entertainment show Start the Weekend, ITV's Sunday Night and the Rich and Famous series. Phillips currently writes an opinion column in the Daily Mirror on Saturdays and works as an agony aunt in New!.

Phillips was a regular panellist on Loose Women in 2002, and was a guest anchor in 2004 and 2005. She returned to Loose Women as a guest anchor in March 2009 and again in March 2010.

In August 2010, she appeared as a panellist on the short-lived ITV chat show 3@Three.

She took part in the third series of Strictly Come Dancing in 2005, with professional partner Brendan Cole. The pair were voted out on Week 4 following several weeks of low scores.

Phillips had also been in the documentary The Killer in Me on 8 November 2007, a show that saw four celebrities agree to take a groundbreaking test that revealed the secret killers lurking in their genes. Phillips joined former England footballer John Barnes, political commentator and presenter Andrew Neil, and Heart FM DJ Toby Anstis who all found out their risk of developing 11 major diseases, including cancer, heart disease and Alzheimer's disease.

Phillips is a regular reporter for the BBC One consumer affairs programme Watchdog. On 19 March 2015, Phillips presented The Truth About...Sugar and on 2 June 2016, she presented The Truth About...Healthy Eating. Both programmes aired on BBC One.

=== GMTV ===
In 1993, Phillips joined GMTV as entertainment correspondent and was promoted to GMTV/Reuters Television's LA correspondent in December 1993. For more than two years, Phillips provided daily and weekly reports and covered a number of big news stories including the Michael Jackson alleged child molestation case, the LA earthquake, the first O.J. Simpson trial, the death of Diana, Princess of Wales and the Oscars. She also interviewed some of the industry's biggest stars such as Leonardo DiCaprio, Clint Eastwood, Brad Pitt and Mel Gibson among others.

From 1997 to 2008, she was the main anchor on GMTV, presenting GMTV Today every Monday to Wednesday. On 28 August 2008, Phillips announced that she was to leave her role as main anchor on GMTV for family reasons. She presented her final show on 18 December 2008.

Phillips returned to GMTV in 2010 in its last series, guest presenting on GMTV with Lorraine.

Between 2010 and 2016, she guest presented the ITV Breakfast programme Lorraine (successor of GMTV with Lorraine).

Phillips was diagnosed with early-onset Alzheimer's disease in 2022 at the age of 61. She and her husband, Martin Frizell, publicly disclosed the diagnosis in July 2023. The news marked a significant shift in her professional trajectory. As Phillips gradually withdrew from public engagements, Frizell announced his departure from This Morning in November 2024, citing changing family priorities, and officially stepped down on 28 February 2025. Phillips co-authored the memoir Remember When: My Life with Alzheimer’s, alongside Frizell and journalist Alison Phillips. Due for release on 17 July 2025, the book draws from personal reflections and lived experience, documenting the progression of her symptoms — including memory loss, impaired speech, and difficulty with everyday tasks — and highlighting the challenges faced by those with early-onset dementia and their carers.

=== Film ===
She voiced the character of Katie Current in the UK release of Shark Tale (2004).

=== Radio ===
Phillips hosted a show on Smooth Radio in the 2–5 pm slot every Sunday, starting from Easter Sunday, 23 March 2008, until 2009 when she left the station.

She also stood in for Simon Mayo on BBC Radio 5 Live from 30 March to 3 April 2009.

== Personal life ==
Phillips married journalist and television executive Martin Frizell in Las Vegas in May 1997; the couple have two sons, Nathaniel and Mackenzie. They live in Wandsworth, south London. Frizell is the former editor of This Morning.

Philips has reported to have been a vegetarian for more than twenty years. However, in 2015, she commented, "I'm mainly vegetarian, but I have fish maybe once a month if my body feels it needs it."

In 2022, Phillips was diagnosed with early-onset Alzheimer's disease. She publicly disclosed the diagnosis in July 2023. Phillips has said she initially attributed symptoms such as brain fog, fatigue and confusion to menopause before receiving further tests. Several of her family members, including both of her parents, also had Alzheimer’s disease.

Phillips is a supporter of Chelsea F.C., although she followed her home town club, Southampton F.C. when she was younger.

Phillips has taken part in clinical trials at University College Hospital in London for the experimental drug Miridesap, which aims to slow the progression of the disease. In early 2025, Frizell announced that he would step down from his role as editor of This Morning to prioritise caring for Phillips.

In July 2025, Phillips published a memoir, Remember When: My Life with Alzheimer’s, in which she reflects on the impact of the disease on her memory, speech, and daily life. She cited hope the book would help others recognise early symptoms of the disease and better navigate complex healthcare systems. Frizell also contributed sections to the book describing his experiences as a caregiver and his concerns about the lack of systemic support for people with Alzheimer’s and their families.

=== Political views ===
Phillips is a supporter of the Labour Party. She said she had been offered a job in November 2007 as public health minister in the administration of Gordon Brown, as well as a peerage. Phillips said she declined due to her responsibilities to her two small children. She attended the 2009 Labour Party Conference in Brighton, where she introduced an address by the Home Secretary Alan Johnson. She was a panellist on BBC One's Question Time in June 2009.

Phillips is a British Republican who supports the abolition of the British monarchy.

Phillips is a patron of the anti-racist organisation Hope Not Hate, which has the slogan "Celebrating Britain's diverse society". In August 2014, Phillips was one of 200 public figures who were signatories to a letter to The Guardian opposing Scottish independence in the run-up to September's referendum on that issue.

=== Charity ===
Phillips is one of the judges of the Daily Mirror Pride of Britain Awards, and for presenting the GMTV Emergency Services award. She has also been one of the judges for the Children of Courage awards. From 15 October 2007, she reported from Geita, North Tanzania, for one week to visit Neema, a 13-year-old girl whom Phillips has been sponsoring, and her family, friends and local schools.

On 13 March 2008, Phillips, while Age Concern Ambassador, presented the Age Concern Grandparent of the Year 2008, which took place in the Houses of Parliament. She has continued as an Ambassador for the successor charity Age UK.

== Filmography ==
=== Television ===
| Year | Title | Role | Notes |
|---|---|---|---|
| 1993–2008 | GMTV | Various presenting roles | |
| 2002, 2004, 2005, 2009, 2010 | Loose Women | Panellist (2002) and guest anchor (2004, 2005, 2009, 2010) | |
| 2005 | Strictly Come Dancing | Contestant | |
| 2007 | The Killer in Me | Contributor | |
| 2009 | The Wright Stuff | Guest presenter | |
| 2010 | GMTV with Lorraine | Guest presenter | |
| 2010 | 3@Three | Regular panellist | |
| 2010–2012, 2015–2016 | Lorraine | Guest presenter | 59 episodes |
| 2015 | Watchdog | Reporter | |
| 2015 | The Truth About...Sugar | Presenter | 1 episode Holiday of My Lifetime ... episode 24    BBC Scotland |
| 2016 | The Truth About...Healthy Eating | Presenter | 1 episode |
| 2016 | Panorama: Pension Rip-Offs Exposed | Presenter | 1 episode |
| 2017 | The Truth About...Stress | Presenter | 1 episode |
| 2017 | Holding Back the Years | Presenter | |
| 2019 | Ryanair: Britain's Most Hated Airline | Presenter | |

=== Films ===
| Year | Title | Role | Notes |
|---|---|---|---|
| 2004 | Shark Tale | Katie Current | UK voiceover |

== Awards and honours ==
In 1996, Phillips was nominated for the Royal Television Society Interview of the Year Award.

On 7 November 2007, Phillips received an Honorary Master of Arts degree from Southampton Solent University, for "being a person distinguished in eminence and by attainments".

On 21 July 2011, Phillips received an Honorary Fellowship from Cardiff University.
