= Anne Davies (British journalist) =

British television presenter (born 1958)

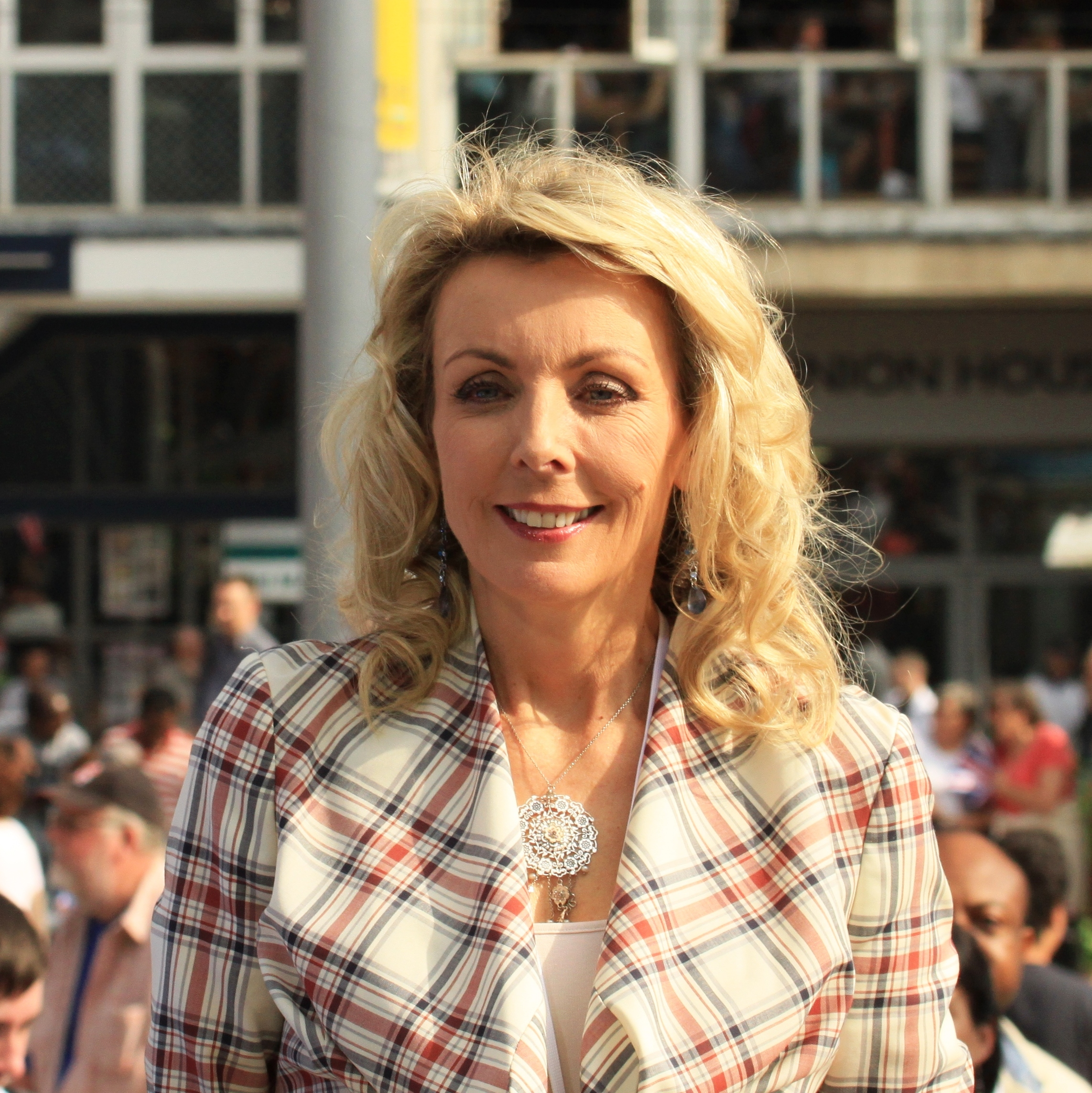
- at the 2012 Olympic torch relay in Nottingham
- Born: Anne Christina Davies; 1958 (age 67–68); Sutton, Surrey, England
- Occupations: Television presenter, newsreader and journalist
- Years active: 1981–present
- Employer(s): BBC; BBC East Midlands
- Known for: East Midlands Today; GMTV
- Children: 2
- Website: annedavies.tv

Anne Christina Davies DL (born 1958) is a British television presenter and newsreader, currently solo presenting BBC East Midlands Today. Her mother was born in County Mayo.

== Television and radio ==
Davies began work for BBC Current Affairs, working behind the scenes on Question Time, Panorama and The Money Programme. She moved to BBC Radio Leicester and BBC Radio Derby. Then, after training for a year on the ITN News Trainee Scheme, Anne became the regular newsreader for Central News East based in Nottingham.

In 1993, she fronted the ITV Daytime Programme Look Good Feel Great with Diana Moran, the environmental series Earthdwellers Guide, and produced and presented fashion shows for the ITV network entitled Off The Peg. Anne then moved to GMTV, presenting the first breakfast programme with Eamonn Holmes. By April she was presenting Sunday Best with Mike Morris. She left this show by January 1994. Between 1994 and 1998 she read the news for the News Hour, presented her own Cookery strand and the GMTV House, provided cover for Lorraine Kelly, and fronted Sunday Review.

== Outside television ==
Davies has written numerous articles for national magazines including Woman's Weekly, My Weekly and Babycare & Pregnancy. In 1999 and 1991, she appeared at the Drury Lane Theatre in two special celebrity pantomimes for the Duchess of York's charity. She is the voice of the on-board bus announcements for Trent Barton's Indigo service. She recorded her voice for the service in 2008.
