= GMTV =

Former UK breakfast television franchisee

- Logo used from 2009-2010
- Type: Breakfast television
- Country: United Kingdom
- Headquarters: The London Studios, London
- Owner: ITV plc
- Launch date: 1 January 1993
- Dissolved: 3 September 2010 (after 17 years, 245 days)
- Picture format: 4:3 PAL (1993–2004); 16:9 PAL / SDTV (2004–2009); 16:9 HDTV (2009–2010)
- Affiliations: ITV; ITV2 (GMTV2)
- Language: English
- Replaced: TV-am
- Replaced by: ITV Breakfast

GMTV (an initialism for Good Morning Television), now legally known as ITV Breakfast Limited, was the name of the national ITV breakfast television contractor/licensee, broadcasting in the United Kingdom from 1 January 1993 to 3 September 2010. It became a wholly owned subsidiary of ITV plc in November 2009. Shortly after, ITV plc announced the programme would end. The final edition of GMTV was broadcast on 3 September 2010.

GMTV transmitted daily from 6 am with GMTV's weekday breakfast magazine programme GMTV broadcasting until 8:25 (9:25 on Friday), followed by GMTV with Lorraine (Monday to Thursday), until the regional ITV franchises took over at 9:25 am. In later years, the switchover was practically seamless and the station was 'surrounded' in the most part by ITV Network continuity on either side of transmission. Consequently, most viewers perceived GMTV simply as a programme on ITV; however, until the complete buyout by ITV plc., it was essentially an independent broadcaster with its own news-gathering operation, sales and management teams and in-house production team. GMTV also broadcast its own children's programmes, independent from CITV until Boohbah was cross-promoted on both sides, with different credits for each.

== History ==
=== Creation ===
By 1990 TV-am, the ITV breakfast television franchise holder, was among the most profitable television stations in the world. Its success attracted rivals in the 1991 ITV franchise auctions. GMTV outbid TV-am in the auction with £34 million. It was backed by LWT, STV, Disney, and the Guardian Media Group. GMTV promised a 'cheerful morning and with more information' - termed the 'F-factor'. A new children's news bulletin was to be broadcast at 7:20 am every morning, while at 8:50 am during the week, a new female-led format was also planned. Carlton bought a 20% stake in the consortium in November 1991. GMTV was originally intended to be called 'Sunrise Television', but as Sky News' breakfast programming also went by that name (and did so until 2019), Sky protested, resulting in the change of name.

In May 1992, GMTV was criticised after unveiling its plans for a more family orientated format with business and city news being dropped. Director of Programmes Lis Howell stated:

The structure of the programme will be fundamentally different from TV-am. It will be a rolling programme, with two presenters in which the news will be long or as short as the news dictates. It's in a sense a news programme but it's a very soft news agenda, although if there is a big story we will ditch everything and cover it better than TV-am would have.

GMTV also turned down an offer from David Frost to continue with his Sunday morning programme, instead choosing to introduce a new leisure programme about family matters, as it believed 'TV-am flung its audience away on Sundays'.

=== Broadcasting ===
The first edition of GMTV was broadcast on 1 January 1993, presented by Eamonn Holmes and Anne Davies. Its main weekday presenters at its launch were Fiona Armstrong and Michael Wilson (Monday to Thursday), broadcast from Studio 5 at The London Studios on the South Bank.

Within six weeks of broadcasting, the station had lost 2 million viewers. Mark Lawson of The Independent dubbed the new franchise 'Grinning Morons Television'. Channel 4, previously an insignificant competitor to TV-am, had become very popular from September 1992 with The Big Breakfast, and continued to increase its audience. Greg Dyke was appointed chairman of the GMTV board and tasked with overhauling the station format, which included 'more popular journalism'. His role was primarily to bring new and imaginative ideas to the station without taking on full day-to-day running. Within three days, Howell had resigned; Dyke had refused to endorse any of her programming strategy for GMTV. Her replacement was Peter McHugh.

On 8 February, following continued poor ratings, Wilson had moved to present a new 'news-focused' slot from 6 to 7am (which in 1994 became the "Reuters News Hour"). Armstrong continued to co-present with Holmes until 12 March, Armstrong was replaced by Lorraine Kelly, with her former position as presenter of the post 9am slot Top of the Morning taken up by Fern Britton.

On 19 April, GMTV was revamped, including a new set that mimicked that of TV-am. Sally Meen become the new weather presenter while Penny Smith became the main newsreader, joining from Sky News.

Within the first six months, GMTV had reported £10 million losses which was double that it initially budgeted for. In early September, GMTV approached the Independent Television Commission (ITC) regarding the possibility of decreasing its quota of news. Just two months earlier, the ITC had criticised the company for being 'too entertainment-led', expressing concerns about other programme areas. The ITC said: 'They [GMTV] will have to put forward a strong case for changing the licence based on the viewers' preferences.' The request was denied, and by the end of its first year on air, the ITC had issued GMTV a formal warning for its 'unsatisfactory performance'.

A final warning was given in May 1994; GMTV would face a fine of £2 million unless standards improved. The ITC acknowledged that considerable improvements had taken place up to the start of that year, but its news bulletins continued to be 'unsatisfactory, and initially too short to cover depth or authority', adding: 'its current affairs and children's material did not meet the aspirations... in terms of quality or production.' As part of the package to rectify the issues, American children's television series Barney & Friends was introduced, in addition to the "Reuters News Hour" and an upmarket Sunday morning programme. By 1994, GMTV had achieved high enough standards to avoid the fine and for the first time, had made a profit.

In July 1994, Anthea Turner joined GMTV to present - along with Mr. Motivator - the summer holiday feature Fun in the Sun, before being paired up with Holmes to present the main programme shortly afterwards. Turner left the station on 24 December 1996, after a dramatic falling out between the pair, which finally resulted in Holmes publicly calling her 'Princess Tippy Toes'. However, management denied she was 'squeezed out', with Turner claiming she had left on her own accord. Fiona Phillips took over her role on 6 January 1997.

In 1998, GMTV returned into the red, with losses of £12 million and a turnover of £80 million In November of that year, GMTV finally received a windfall: the ITC reduced the amount the station had to pay to the treasury from £50 million to £20 million - the most dramatic reduction of all the licenses. The ITC believed this would allow GMTV the money to invest in more programming.

GMTV continued to strengthen its output, receiving further praise from the ITC in its Annual Performance Review of 1999: 'The overall programme quality improved...with more feature items and greater breadth of coverage, better journalistic and technical resources.' This led to increased audience share for GMTV among adult viewers; the weekend output for children was also strengthened. The ITC praised GMTV's greater emphasis on overseas coverage and access to key figures in the news, particularly for live interviews.

Social action programming was particularly successful. There were signs of improvement in the information content of the magazine programme for older children, Diggit (previously criticised by the ITC). The ITC proposed improvements in two areas to be made priorities for the year ahead: '... In Sunday programming for adults, where there is scope for better background and analysis to key political stories alongside the major interviews, and in information content in programming for school age children.'

=== 2000s ===
During 1999, the STV Group held talks into buying out the other shareholders in GMTV, with Disney believed to be keen on the idea. By September, an agreement had been reached to acquire Guardian Media Group's 15% stake for £20 million, but both Carlton and Granada objected to the deal. Guardian Media Group concluded in selling off its 15% stake in GMTV for £18 million in January 2000, with all three companies receiving 5% - allowing the four remaining stakeholders to have an equal 25% stake in the company.

In October 2003, STV made public its interest in acquiring Carlton and Granada's stakes in GMTV. Andrew Flanagan, chief executive, was quoted as saying: 'We would be interested in buying GMTV. You need a trigger to try to do something and that's what we have tried to engineer.' STV believed having a controlling stake in GMTV would allow an effective command against the newly formed ITV sales department. In September 2004, ITV plc purchased STV Group's 25% in the company for £31 million after being given the go ahead from the Office of Fair Trading - despite advertisers' fears it could give ITV influence over pricing. SMG said: '[We] are pulling out of GMTV because it did not want to hold a minority interest in someone else's media business.'

In 2005, Holmes left the station. It was later exposed he was deeply unhappy with the 'dumbing down and commercialisation', which resulted in him hating his bosses.

=== Phone-in scandal ===
In April 2007, BBC One's programme Panorama made claims that Opera - a company dealing with GMTV's phone-in competitions - were finalising shortlists of potential winners 'long before' lines closed, which resulted in viewers wasting an estimated £10 million a year since April 2003 on entering premium rate phone competitions. Paul Corley, managing director of GMTV, said: 'I'd just like to apologise for everything that's gone on. GMTV had trusted Opera, but, the fact is it appears two or three people at this telecoms company were taking it upon themselves to do this even without the knowledge of the management. This contradicted claims made by Panorama that in 2003, sales director Mark Nuttall at Opera had discovered the situation and sent an e-mail to staff, saying: 'Make sure they never find out you are picking the winners early.' Two senior executives resigned: Controller of Enterprises Kate Fleming, and Managing Director Paul Corley.

On 24 September that year, Opera was fined £250,000, while GMTV was fined £2 million by Ofcom, who stated: 'the breaches constituted a substantial breakdown in the fundamental relationship of trust between a public service broadcaster and its viewers. The breaches were extremely serious as they involved longstanding and systematic failures in the conduct of broadcast competitions.' GMTV pledged to refund a total of £35 million to all viewers affected.

A month later, the Serious Fraud Office took the decision to review the evidence from Ofcom into the phone-in scandal. An SFO spokeswoman said: 'Following media reports and some complaints received from the general public about GMTV's use of premium rate telephone services, we are in touch with Ofcom although no SFO investigation is under way...furthermore, the SFO will await the outcome of Ofcom's investigation into ITV's use of premium rate telephone services as highlighted in the Deloitte report.' On 10 March 2008, the Serious Fraud Office decided not to investigate the phone-in scandal, stating it did not meet its criteria for an investigation.

=== 2008–09 ===
A major overhaul of GMTV output took place during the summer of 2008 - resulting in part from the loss of viewers to new competition from other digital channels, and to counter criticism that its output had become too lightweight. Red Bee Media was brought in as a consultant, with a view to refreshing the station's on-screen look, which had changed very little since 1993. ITV and Disney agreed a £4.5 million investment to modernise the production of the programme, including new equipment such as Avid editing suites. This then led to the relaunch of GMTV on 5 January 2009, introducing Emma Crosby and Kirsty McCabe, who themselves replaced Fiona Phillips and Andrea McLean.

In July 2008, it was announced that McLean would quit working on GMTV to focus on her role on Loose Women, to share the permanent host job with Jackie Brambles. On 31 December that year, McLean left GMTV after 11 years as a weather presenter.

Phillips left GMTV on 18 December that same year, after 12 years as its main presenter. She told viewers that leaving was 'one of the hardest decisions I've ever made'.

=== ITV plc ownership ===
ITV plc attempted to buy out Disney's stake in GMTV, following its gaining of 75% control, in order to secure 24-hours control of Channel 3 in England and Wales; it eventually paid £18m for the remaining 25% on 25 November 2009.

As a result, many changes were made shortly after:

- The editor of GMTV, Martin Frizell, was sacked in December 2009 with Sue Walton temporarily replacing him.
- On 4 March 2010, it was announced that presenter and newsreader Penny Smith was leaving GMTV, with presenter John Stapleton being redeployed as special correspondent. Smith presented her final broadcast on 4 June 2010.
- Also announced on that same day was the decision of political correspondent Gloria De Piero to quit GMTV in February 2010, to stand as a Labour Party parliamentary candidate.
- On 6 March, GMTV Kids presenters Jamie Rickers and Anna Williamson were made redundant. They appeared for the last time on the programme in May 2010, meaning no presenter linked between programmes in the Toonattik strand.
- In early April, there was speculation that Eamonn Holmes and Kate Thornton were in the running to present the new revamp programme. A source said: 'With Eamonn and Kate, it will almost be like a pilot. If it works, they will be licking their lips. It has not been signed but all sides are actively considering it. There is still some work to do but it is looking very likely.'
- On 19 April, it was announced that BBC presenter Adrian Chiles was quitting his roles with the corporation, to join ITV plc on a six-year contract, co-presenting on GMTV and casting doubt over the futures of incumbent male hosts Andrew Castle and Ben Shephard.
- On 21 April, it was confirmed that Ben Shephard was leaving GMTV after 10 years, after earlier telling management he would not be renewing his contract.
- On 7 May, it was announced that former The One Show editor Ian Rumsey would take editorial control of the programme from June, with Paul Connolly as his deputy, taking over the temporary placement of Sue Walton, as she moved to tackling the move of GMTV with Lorraine to a new stand-alone programme.
- On 10 June, it was confirmed that Andrew Castle would leave GMTV after 10 years. On the same day, ITV plc. announced that they would be dropping the GMTV brand name from the breakfast franchise in favour of a relaunched format later in the year.
- On 20 June, ITV plc. announced that Christine Bleakley would join Chiles as lead female host, after signing an exclusive three-year deal to present on the breakfast slot, and other prime-time entertainment shows. The pair had previously worked together on the BBC's The One Show.
- As of July, GMTV came from Studio 3 at TLS (where Loose Women came from); this move was because Al Jazeera Sports, which originally came from Studio 7, had to move to Studio 5, so that Studio 7 could be made ready for Daybreak. (This was also where the final programme was broadcast from.)
- On 9 July it was confirmed that the new ITV plc. breakfast programme, from 6 September, would be named Daybreak and that GMTV with Lorraine was set to become a standalone programme with the title Lorraine, while 'GMTV Limited' was rebranded ITV Breakfast Limited.
- On 20 July, it was confirmed that Kate Garraway would move from a presenting position on GMTV to the role of entertainment editor on Daybreak. Other members of the team, moving over from GMTV, were confirmed as John Stapleton continuing in the role of special correspondent, Dan Lobb as sports editor, Dr. Hilary Jones becoming health editor, and Richard Gaisford continuing in the role of chief correspondent.
- On 20 July, Richard Arnold and Carla Romano announced they would be leaving GMTV, after 10 years with the company, to pursue their careers elsewhere.
- On 1 August, Emma Crosby confirmed that she would not be part of the new programme.
- GMTV with Lorraine aired for the last time, with Myleene Klass presenting on 2 September, whilst GMTV came to an end with Andrew Castle and Emma Crosby presenting the next day.

== See also ==
- List of GMTV programmes
- List of GMTV presenters
- Daybreak
- Lorraine

ITV national franchise
Preceded by TV-am	Breakfast television 1 January 1993 – 3 September 2010	Succeeded by ITV Breakfast
