= Sky News presenters and editorial staff =

Presenters and journalists of Sky News, a British television news channel

Sky News has over 50 staff who appear on camera in presenter, editor and correspondent roles.

== Presenters ==
=== Main programme presenters ===
Name	Role	Programme(s)	On Air	Location
Sophy Ridge	Lead Politics Presenter	Mornings with Ridge and Frost	Monday-Thursday 07:00-10:00	Westminster
Wilfred Frost	Lead Business & US Presenter	Mornings with Ridge and Frost	Monday-Thursday 07:00-10:00	Westminster
Anna Jones	Presenter	Mornings with Jones and Melbourne	Friday 07:00-10:00 Saturday 06:00-10:00; Sunday 06:00-08:30	Westminster
Kamali Melbourne	Presenter	Mornings with Jones and Melbourne	Friday 07:00-10:00 Saturday 06:00-10:00; Sunday 06:00-08:30	Westminster
Sir Trevor Phillips	Presenter	Sunday Morning with Trevor Phillips	Sunday 08:30-10:00	Westminster
Gareth Barlow	Presenter	Mornings; Sky News Today with Gareth Barlow	Monday-Thursday 06:00-07:00; 10:00-13:00	Osterley
Jayne Secker	Presenter	Sky News Today with Jayne Secker	Monday-Thursday 13:00-17:00	Osterley
Samantha Washington	Presenter	Sky News Today with Samantha Washington	Friday-Saturday 10:00-14:00	Osterley
Matt Barbet	Presenter	Sky News Today with Matt Barbet	Friday-Saturday 14:00-17:00; Sunday 10:00-17:00	Osterley
Mark Austin	Chief Presenter	The News Hour with Mark Austin	Monday-Thursday 17:00-19:00	Osterley
Jonathan Samuels	Presenter	The News Hour with Jonathan Samuels; Sky News	Friday-Sunday 17:00-20:00	Osterley
Cathy Newman	Presenter	The Cathy Newman Show	Monday-Thursday 19:00-20:00	Westminster
Sarah Jane Mee	Lead UK News Presenter	The UK Tonight with Sarah-Jane Mee	Monday-Thursday 20:00-21:00	Osterley
Yalda Hakim	Lead World News Presenter	The World with Yalda Hakim	Monday-Thursday 21:00-22:00	Westminster
Anna Botting	Chief Presenter	The Wrap with Anna Botting	Monday-Thursday 22:00-00:00	Osterley
Gillian Joseph	Presenter	Sky News; The Wrap with Gillian Joseph	Friday-Sunday 22:00-00:00	Osterley

=== Overnight and relief presenters ===
Name	Title
Leah Boleto	Presenter
Mhari Aurora	Presenter
Anila Dhami	Overnight Presenter
Saima Mohsin	Presenter
Sam Naz	Overnight Presenter
Simon Pusey	Overnight Presenter
Nick Quraishi	Overnight Presenter
Barbara Serra	Relief Presenter

== Editors and correspondents ==
=== Editors ===
Name	Title
Beth Rigby	Political Editor
Sam Coates	Deputy Political Editor
Mark Kleinman	City Editor
Ed Conway	Economics and Data Editor
Jason Farrell	Home Editor
Dominic Waghorn	International Affairs Editor
Deborah Haynes	Security and Defence Editor
Tom Clarke	Science and Technology Editor

=== Correspondents ===
Name	Title
Jon Craig	Chief Political Correspondent
Nick Martin	People & Politics Correspondent
Rob Powell	Political Correspondent
Ali Fortescue	Political Correspondent
Serena Barker-Singh	Political Correspondent
Amanda Akass	Political Correspondent
Katie Spencer	Arts & Entertainment Correspondent
Paul Kelso	Business & Economics Correspondent
Gurpreet Narwan	Business & Economics Correspondent
Lisa Holland	Communities Correspondent
Martin Brunt	Crime Correspondent
Tom Cheshire	Data and Forensics Correspondent
Ashish Joshi	Health Correspondent
Rhiannon Mills	Royal Correspondent
Laura Bundock	Royal Correspondent
Becky Johnson	Social Affairs Correspondent
Thomas Moore	Science Correspondent
Jacquie Beltrao	Sports Correspondent
Rob Harris	Sports Correspondent
Michael Clarke	Military Analyst
Sean Bell	Military Analyst
Kirsty McCabe	Meteorologist
Stuart Ramsay	Chief Correspondent
Alex Crawford	Special Correspondent
Yousra Elbagir	Africa Correspondent (Johannesburg)
Helen-Ann Smith	Asia Correspondent (Beijing)
Cordelia Lynch	Asia Correspondent
Siobhan Robbins	Europe Correspondent (Berlin)
Alistair Bunkall	Europe Correspondent (Brussels)
Adam Parsons	Middle East Correspondent (Jerusalem)
Neville Lazarus	India Reporter (New Delhi)
Ivor Bennett	Moscow Correspondent
Martha Kelner	US Correspondent (Los Angeles)
James Matthews	US Correspondent (Washington)
Mark Stone	US Correspondent (Washington)
Diana Magnay	International Correspondent
John Sparks	International Correspondent
Alex Rossi	International Correspondent
Tom Parmenter	National Correspondent
David Blevins	US Correspondent
Stephen Murphy	Ireland Correspondent (Dublin)
Lisa Dowd	Midlands Correspondent
Shamaan Freeman-Powell	Midlands Correspondent
Greg Milam	Chief North of England Correspondent
Frazer Maude	North of England Correspondent
Shingi Mararike	North of England Correspondent
Katerina Vittozzi	North of England Correspondent
Connor Gillies	Scotland Correspondent (Edinburgh)
Dan Whitehead	West of England and Wales Correspondent
Adele Robinson	News Correspondent
Sadiya Chowdhury	News Correspondent
Rachael Venables	News Correspondent
Becky Cotterill	News Correspondent
Alice Porter	News Correspondent
Emma Birchley	News Correspondent
Mollie Malone	News Correspondent

== Former presenters, editors and correspondents ==
- Lisa Aziz (later with LBC News)
- Faye Barker (now with ITN)
- Adam Boulton
- Enda Brady (now with TRT World)
- Colin Brazier (later with LBC) Colin's last show on LBC was on 31 August 2023 with Colin deciding to completely give up journalism.
- Ginny Buckley
- Lukwesa Burak (now with BBC News)
- Kay Burley On 5 February 2025, the 36th anniversary of the first Sky News broadcast and her first day with the network, Burley announced her retirement. Her announcement came during that morning's broadcast of Breakfast with Kay Burley which would be her final broadcast.
- Stephanie Callister
- David Chater
- Michelle Clifford
- Marverine Cole
- Stephen Cole (moved to CGTN in 2019 and retired from broadcast television in 2022)
- Liam Creagh
- Vivien Creegor
- Dharshini David
- Jason de la Pena
- Stephen Dixon (now with GB News)
- Rona Dougall (now with STV)
- Lorna Dunkley (Joined ABC News (Australia) in 2017)
- Julie Etchingham (now with ITV News)
- Gemma Evans
- Gamal Fahnbulleh (now with Granada Reports)
- Juliette Foster (now with BBC World Service/BBC News)
- Bob Friend (deceased 2008)
- Steve Gaisford
- Steff Gaulter (now at Al Jazeera English)
- Steve Hargrave
- Charlotte Hawkins (now on Good Morning Britain on ITV)
- Sarah Hewson (now with TalkTV)
- Nicola Hill
- Eamonn Holmes (Now on GB News, Weekday Breakfast)
- Alexandra Hill (now at ITN)
- Faisal Islam (joined BBC News in 2019)
- Jannat Jalil (now with BBC News)
- Sangeeta Kandola (now at ITN)
- Phil Lavelle (now with CCTV America)
- Graeme Le Saux
- Kimberley Leonard Left 26th August 2023.
- Mark Longhurst (later with GB News)
- Emily Maitlis (Presenter of The News Agents since 2022)
- Tim Marshall
- Kate McCann (now with Times Radio)
- Simon McCoy
- Dermot Murnaghan Left 23 February 2023, after 16 years on Sky News. The last Tonight News with Dermot was broadcast on 28 February 2023. He died on 11 July 2026
- Denise Nurse
- Glen Oglaza
- Kevin Owen (later with RT)
- Martin Popplewell
- Jeff Randall
- Samantha Simmonds (now with BBC World News)
- Matt Smith
- Penny Smith
- Peter Spencer (retired)
- Martin Stanford (later at LBC News)
- Jeremy Thompson (retired 2016)
- Claudia-Liza Vanderpuije (now with 5 News)
- Hannah Vaughan Jones (later with CNN International)
- Lucy Verasamy (now with ITV Weather)
- Isabel Webster (later with GB News)
- Holly Williams (now at CBS News)
- Andrew Wilson
- Francis Wilson
- Michael Wilson
