= Timeline of Sky News =

This is a timeline of the history of Sky News, a British free-to-air television news channel and organisation.

== 1980s ==
- 1988
  - 8 June – Rupert Murdoch announces plans to launch a four-channel service on the soon to be launched Astra satellite. One of the channels will be a continuous news channel.
- 1989
  - 5 February – At just after 6pm, Sky News launches. It begins broadcasting a few minutes after the launch of Sky Television.

== 1990s ==
- 1990
  - 2 December – Following the merger of Sky TV and BSB, Sky News launches on the Marco Polo satellite although arts programmes are shown for a short time as a weekend opt-out service from Sky News.
- 1991
  - 16 January–2 March – Sky News provides rolling coverage of the Gulf War.
- 1992
  - February – Ahead of TV-am losing its licence to broadcast, it closes its in-house news service and contracts out its news provision to Sky News. This is the first time that output from Sky News is seen on terrestrial television. This continues until 31 December, TV-am's last day on air.
  - 31 December – Sky, and Sky News, stops broadcasting via the Marco Polo satellite.
- 1993
  - No notable events.
- 1994
  - No notable events.
- 1995
  - No notable events.
- 1996
  - No notable events.
- 1997
  - 31 August – Television schedules are dominated by coverage of the Diana, Princess of Wales's car accident and Sky News provides rolling coverage for much of the following week, culminating in her funeral on 6 September.
  - 9 November – Sky News faces competition for the first time when the BBC launches a news channel, BBC News 24.
- 1998
  - 1 October – Sky Digital launches.
- 1999
  - 8 March – Following the axing of ITV's News at Ten, Sky News launches Sky News at Ten.
  - June – Sky News Radio is launched.

== 2000s ==
- 2000
  - March – Sky News Active launches.
- 2001
  - 11 September – Viewers witness a terrorist attack on the United States, and the collapse of the Twin Towers in New York City. Sky News provides rolling coverage with some of the coverage coming from Fox News.
- 2002
  - 7 January – Sky News content becomes available on terrestrial television for the first time in a decade when Channel 5 begins simulcasting part of its breakfast news programme Sunrise.
  - February – Sky News Today is launched. It is the new name for Sky News' weekday morning slot.
  - 30 October – Freeview launches as a replacement for the failed ITV Digital and Sky News is one of three channels that Sky provides for the new service.
- 2003
  - 20 March – As the 2003 invasion of Iraq begins, Sky News provides continuous live coverage of unfolding events.
- 2004
  - 24 May – Sky News Ireland is launched as a bespoke news broadcast for the Republic of Ireland.
- 2005
  - 1 January – Sky News replaces ITN as news provider to Channel 5. Consequently, the channel's output is seen on a terrestrial channel for the first time, both in early morning scheduled slots and during major news events, such as Sky News' overnight coverage of the results of the 2005 General Election.
  - Sky News launches an overnight global bulletin Sky World News. It broadcasts each weeknight between 3am and 5.30am.
  - 24 October – The first edition of global news programme World News Tonight is broadcast on Sky News as part of a revamp of the channel which sees rolling news replaced by presented-led programming. The new show co-insides with a move to new studios in Isleworth, Greater London. The new studio is integrated with the newsroom. New music was scored by Adelphoi Music and recorded with a full orchestra at Air Studios, Hampstead, and mastered at Metropolis Studios. Other new shows, in a schedule designed around "appointment to view" programmes rather than continuous rolling news, include Julie Etchingham presenting The Sky Report, Kay Burley presented a new programme called Lunchtime Live from 12 to 2 pm, the daytime show Sky News Today introduces a three-presenter format and the following weekend, Saturday Live is launched.
- 2006
  - 10 July – After less than a year on air, the final edition of World News Tonight is broadcast on Sky News. The programme is dropped due to a poor reception from viewers which had seen BBC News 24 overtake Sky News in the ratings. The evening programmes were replaced by rolling news and an interactive programme, Sky News with Martin Stanford, and the return to a two-presenter format on Sky News Today.
  - 3 November – The final edition of Sky News Ireland is broadcast. The programme had been intended to end at the end of the month but finished early following a staff walk-out following the announcement of the decision to end the programme. The walkout was over the handling of the closure by their British Sky News managers in London.
- 2007
  - 1 March – The Sky Basics channels, including Sky News, stop broadcasting on Virgin Media when the two companies cannot agree a new carriage deal.
  - 1 October – Sky News introduces another new schedule, extending Kay Burley's Lunchtime Live programme and renaming it Afternoon Live. It also switches to a new format for much of the day, with a solo lead presenter and a summary newsreader. Sky News also puts more emphasis on interactive news with Martin Stanford's new SkyNews.com programme; an early evening financial news programme presented by Jeff Randall, was also introduced, initially on Mondays only.
- 2008
  - 8 September – Colin Brazier presents the first edition of The Live Desk, and Martin Stanford's Sky.com News became SkyNews.com, moving to 7 pm every weeknight.
  - 13 November – After more than 18 months, the Sky Basics channels, including Sky News, return to Virgin Media.
- 2009
  - Jeff Randall Live is expanded from a weekly show to being on air four nights each week, Monday to Thursday.
  - 3 March – Independent Radio News switches its main supplier of news from ITN to Sky News Radio, expanding its customer client list by more than 280 stations and giving it a near-monopoly in UK commercial radio news provision. The first Sky News produced bulletin is broadcast at 2pm.

== 2010s ==
- 2010
  - 6 May – Sky News HD launches.
  - 21 May – Sky News confirms that it is to ditch weather presenters, apart from during breakfast programme Sky News Sunrise, and replace them with headline bulletins read by the news presenter. The move comes at the same time as Sky News slims down its sports reporting in favour of bulletins from Sky Sports News.
  - 10 September – The final edition of SkyNews.com is broadcast.
  - December – The final edition of Sunday Live with Adam Boulton is broadcast. It is replaced in the new year with a similar show presented by Dermot Murnaghan. Boulton moved to a new weekday show at 13:00 on Sky News.
- 2011
  - 15 January – The final edition of Saturday Live is broadcast.
  - 17 January – The first edition of Boulton & Co is broadcast.
  - April – Live at Five is dropped from the schedule following a change in branding policy, and the majority of Sky News output is rebranded as simply Sky News. The name had been in use since the channel's first day on air. Also disappearing from the schedule in 2011 is The Live Desk.
  - December – Sky News produces the Queen's Christmas Day broadcast for the first time.
  - December – Today is the final day in which Sky News provides Channel 5 with its news coverage as the following day sees the contract return to ITN.
- 2012
  - 23 October – Digital switchover is completed in the UK meaning that Sky News is now available in around 90% of UK homes.
  - 26 November – A 60-second bespoke news bulletin from Sky News is launched on Pick and is broadcast nightly at 21:00.
- 2013
  - No notable events.
- 2014
  - 27 March – The final edition of business news programme Jeff Randall Live is broadcast.
  - 1 August – The final edition of weekday lunchtime programme Boulton & Co is broadcast.
  - 1 September – Sky News launches a new flagship evening bulletin Sky News Tonight.
- 2015
  - Following the 2015 general election, Sky News is rebranded, with a new top-of-the-hour sequence and on-screen graphics. The traditional opening voiceover, read by Bruce Hammal, is dropped after two decades in use.
- 2016
  - 21 April – The first edition of discussion programme The Pledge is broadcast. It is broadcast each Thursday evening at 8pm.
  - 24 October – Sky News begins broadcasting from a new studio (Studio 21) at Sky Central, Sky's new headquarters in West London.
- 2017
  - 8 January – Sophy Ridge on Sunday launches. Also launching in 2017 is weekday show All Out Politics.
- 2018
  - 24 September – The first edition of teatime programme The News Hour with Mark Austin is broadcast.
- 2019
  - 13 October – Sky News Sunrise is broadcast for the final time. The programme, which launched with Sky News first went on air more than 30 years ago, is broadcast. It is replaced the following day with two new shows – The Early Rundown and Sky News @ Breakfast.
  - 16 October – 1 November – Sky News operates a pop-up channel called Sky News Brexit-Free. On air on weekdays from 17:00 to 22:00, it broadcasts news which is unrelated to the United Kingdom's exit from the European Union. Sky News head John Ryley cited viewer fatigue over the near-constant coverage of Brexit as justification for the channel.

== 2020s ==
- 2020
  - March – The Pledge is suspended due to the COVID-19 pandemic. The programme has not subsequently returned.
  - 23 September – The weekday editions of Sky News @ Breakfast are renamed Kay Burley.
  - 10 December – Sky News Breakfast replaces Kay Burley after Burley stepped back from presenting the show for six months, as a result of breaching London's tier 2 coronavirus restrictions.
- 2021
  - 7 April – Sky News launches a weekday climate news programme The Daily Climate Show.
  - 3 June – Sky News updates its top-of-the-hour sequence, soundtrack and on-screen graphics package. A Sky News source denies the move is related to the launch of GB News.
  - 7 June – The Kay Burley branding reappears following Burley's return to the channel.
- 2022
  - No notable events.
- 2023
  - 24 May – Sky News launches an audio-only feed, making it available on the TuneIn service.
  - 3 July – Sky News makes major changes to its weekday line-up. Sky News Today now airs from 10am until 4.30pm with Ian King Live renamed Business Live and broadcasting in two half-hour slots at 11.30am and 4.30pm.
  - 16 July – Sophy Ridge on Sunday is broadcast for the final time.
  - September – A new weeknight show Politics Hub launches, airing on weeknights at 7pm, presented by Sophy Ridge. Trevor Phillips will take over the Sunday morning show.
  - 2 October – UK Tonight with Sarah-Jane Mae launches, broadcasting Mondays to Thursday, 8pm to 9pm.
- 2024
  - 8 January – The weekday editions of Sky News Breakfast are refreshed. The programme starts at the earlier time of 6am, and new presents join the programme.
  - 22 January – The World launches. The hour-long international news programme airs Monday to Thursday at 9pm and is part of Sky News' evening sequence of individually branded, and focussed, hour-long programmes.
  - 21 June – Sky News stops broadcasting in standard definition on Virgin Media.
- 2025
  - 3 November – Wilfred Frost and Sophy Ridge will take over as presenters of Sky News Breakfast. Gareth Barlow will host mid-mornings and a pre-breakfast news hour at 6am. Kamali Melbourne and Anna Jones will host weekend mornings.
- 2026
  - 25 January – The final edition of Sky News at Ten is aired. The programme ends after more than 25 years on air.
  - 26 January – The first edition of a new two-hourly late evening programme The Wrap is broadcast. The programme, which focuses on storytelling and debate rather than being a traditional news bulletin, will include a look at the next day’s newspapers.
  - 6 September – Sky News’s new Sunday morning programme launches. Sunday Morning With… is presented by a different person each week. This replaces the previous incarnation which was presented by Trevor Phillips, who left Sky to work for CBS News.

== See also ==
- Timeline of the BBC News Channel
- Timeline of ITN
