= Sky News at 9 =

Evening news programme, broadcast on Sky News

- Genre: News
- Presented by: Anna Botting (Mon-Thurs); Gillian Joseph (Fri-Sun)
- Countries of origin: United Kingdom (Broadcast internationally)
- Original language: English

Production
- Production location: Studio 21, Sky Central; Osterley, London
- Camera setup: Multi-camera
- Running time: 60 minutes
- Production company: Sky plc

Original release
- Network: Sky News
- Release: 9 January 2012 – present

Sky News at 9 is a daily hour long news programme on Sky News, airing between 9:00 pm and 10:00 pm. It is a round-up of the day's top stories with analysis from Sky's correspondents. The show is presented by Anna Botting from Monday to Thursday and Gillian Joseph on Friday to Sunday.

== Format ==
Sky News at 9 is an hour-long newscast digesting the day's stories plus providing analysis and live interviews. The final minutes of the programme often feature a look at the first of the next day's national newspaper front pages as well as a look ahead to Sky News at 10. Sky News at 9 is a longer form news bulletin than the 30-minute newscasts - such as Sky News at Ten - that follow it in the schedule.

On Saturday and Sunday, the Sky News at 9 presenter starts their shift an hour earlier hosting the 8 pm hour of Sky News. This hour uses the same studio setup and backdrop as Sky News at 9.

Frequent relief presenters of the slot include Jonathan Samuels, Jayne Secker and Barbara Serra while Anna Jones often covers weekday editions of the programme when Anna Botting isn't available.

=== Current presenters ===
Presenter	Role
Anna Botting	Monday-Wednesday, Alternate Thursday Presenter
Gillian Joseph	Alternate Thursday, Friday-Sunday Presenter
Jonathan Samuels	Relief Presenter
Jayne Secker	Relief Presenter
Barbara Serra	Relief Presenter

Preceded by Sky News Tonight	Sky News weekday schedule 21:00–22:00	Succeeded by Sky News at 10
