= Sky News Breakfast =

Breakfast television news programme, broadcast on Sky News

- Genre: Breakfast television programme
- Presented by: Wilfred Frost; Leah Boleto; Anna Jones
- Country of origin: United Kingdom
- Original language: English

Production
- Production location: Studio 21, Sky Central; Osterley, London
- Camera setup: Multi-camera
- Running time: 240 minutes (Saturday); 150 minutes (Sunday)

Original release
- Network: Sky News
- Release: 18 October 2019 – 2 November 2025

Related
- Kay Burley

Sky News Breakfast is a British breakfast television programme that aired Monday- Saturday and Bank Holidays from 6–10am and Sunday from 6–8.30am on Sky News. The show launched on Friday, 18 October 2019 as the replacement for long-running breakfast show Sunrise.

As of June 2024, Wilfred Frost, Leah Boleto and Anna Jones were the programme's regular main presenters, with Mhari Aurora the programme's regular political correspondent. Sports presenter Jacqui Beltrao co-presented from Friday to Sunday. Most programmes were broadcast from Westminster rather than Osterley.

The show was previously presented by Kay Burley, until her exit from Sky News in early 2025.

The show was one of Sky's final double headed formats - the other being Sky News Today - and was presented by Stephen Dixon and Gillian Joseph from Sky Centre in Osterley until January 2021.

The programme was replaced by Mornings with Ridge and Frost from Monday, 3 November 2025; presented by Sophy Ridge and Wilfred Frost.

== History ==
Sky News announced on 23 September 2019 that they were introducing two new breakfast shows to replace Sunrise. Alongside the announcement of Kay Burley, Sky News also announced "a slightly more relaxed style to kick off the weekend" in the form of Sky News Breakfast with Stephen Dixon and Gillian Joseph.

It aired for the first time on Friday, 18 October 2019. The show has a hard-news focus however is slightly more relaxed, containing human-interest stories, in comparison to the weekday format.

The show initially ran from Friday-Sunday however in September 2020, it became weekends only when a relaunched Kay Burley began broadcasting five days a week. At the same time, Sky News @ Breakfast was renamed Sky News Breakfast, with Sky dropping the @ from both breakfast shows.

By November 2021, there was no regular presenter for the programme, as Dixon left Sky News and Joseph moved to present Sky News at Ten at weekends. Jacquie Beltrao presented sport on the programme. In December 2021, the then-presenter of Early Rundown Niall Paterson was announced as the show's permanent host, starting in early 2022. However this changed once again later that same year with Anna Jones becoming the shows main presenter from Fridays to Sundays.

After Burley's departure in 2025, various presenters anchored the programme, including Wilfred Frost, Leah Boleto, Matt Barbet, and Kamali Melbourne.

On Monday, 3 November 2025, the programme was replaced by Mornings with Ridge and Frost, presented by Sophy Ridge and Wilfred Frost.

== Broadcast ==
The show currently airs from 6-10am Monday to Saturdays, and from 6–8.30am on Sundays, live from Sky News' studios in Westminster.

In January 2021, following Kay Burley’s breach of coronavirus regulations, the Sky News Breakfast name was used on programming guides for the weekday slot. However, both shows continued to broadcast differing formats. As a result of Burley’s absence, Gillian Joseph hosted the programme solo with Stephen Dixon covering Monday-Thursday editions of The Early Rundown whilst Niall Paterson was covering for Burley. From March 2021, Dixon and Paterson swapped roles, with Dixon hosting the Kay Burley slot until her return in June 2021.

== On-Air Team ==
=== Current presenters ===
Presenter	Role
Anna Jones	Main Presenter
Wilfred Frost	Main Presenter
Leah Boleto	Main Presenter
Jayne Secker	Relief Presenter
Gareth Barlow	Relief Presenter
Kamali Melbourne	Relief Presenter

Presenter	Role
Jacquie Beltrao	Sports Presenter
Mhari Aurora	Political Correspondent

Other relief sport and weather presenters appear during holiday and absences.

=== Former presenters ===
Presenter	Role
Kay Burley	Main Presenter
Stephen Dixon	Main Presenter
Gillian Joseph	Main Presenter
Kimberley Leonard	Relief Presenter
Niall Paterson	Relief Presenter
