= Sunrise (British TV programme) =

British breakfast programme, broadcast on Sky News

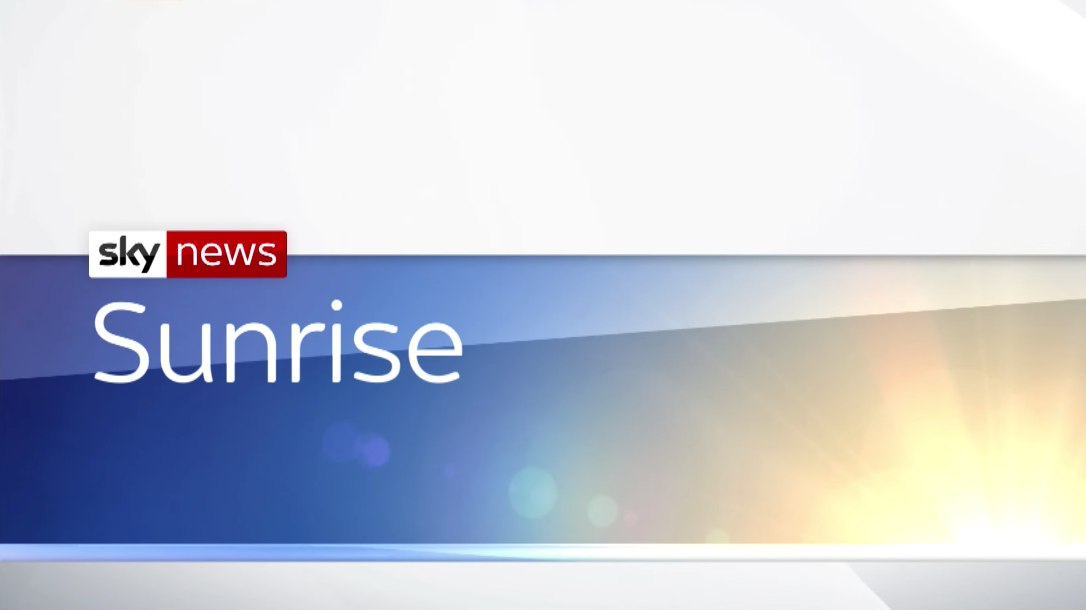
- Final titlecard
- Genre: Breakfast television programme
- Opening theme: Sky News theme
- Countries of origin: United Kingdom (Broadcast internationally)
- Original language: English

Production
- Production location: Studio 6, Sky Studios; Osterley, London (2018–2019)
- Camera setup: Multi-camera
- Running time: 270 minutes (1989–1995); 240 minutes (1995–2005, 2016–2019 (Saturdays); 180 minutes (2005–2016, 2018–2019 (Sunday–Friday)
- Production company: Sky plc

Original release
- Network: Sky News
- Release: 6 February 1989 – 13 October 2019

Sunrise is a British weekday breakfast programme which was broadcast on Sky News from 6 February 1989 to 13 October 2019. The programme was replaced by The Early Rundown (Monday-Friday), Kay Burley @ Breakfast (Monday-Thursday), and Sky News @ Breakfast (Friday-Sunday) in October 2019.

== History ==
At its beginning in February 1989, Sunrise ran from 5:00 am to 9:30 am. In 1991, it became one of only two slots across Sky's 20-year history to have its own individual graphics, the other being flagship bulletin Live at Five. These graphics were swiftly withdrawn after viewers and staff alike deemed them too gaudy. Sunrise has used the channel's graphics ever since. However, it is common for Sunrise to use a slight variation of some elements, such as in 1997, when it had its own variation on the-then title sequence, and in 2005 when Sunrise used an individual variation of the Sky News globe.

When Sky News relaunched on 24 October 2005, Eamonn Holmes and Lorna Dunkley became the regular presenters of the weekday editions of Sunrise, with Steve Gaisford and Emma Crosby fronting the weekend edition. Jacquie Beltrao provided sports updates during the week. The broadcast time was now 6:00–9:00 am.

In January 2007, Dunkley moved to Sky News' weekend coverage. Holmes was then joined on Sunrise by new signing Charlotte Hawkins.

In March 2014, Hawkins left Sky News to join Good Morning Britain; her replacement was Isabel Webster, who took up her post as Sunrise co-host later that month.

Previously, weekend editions were presented by Mark Longhurst and Gillian Joseph. In 2012, Stephen Dixon replaced Longhurst on the programmes screened by Sunrise from Friday to Sunday, with Longhurst transferring over to present the weekend evening slot. Charlie Thomas continues to present sports updates.

In October 2016, Sunrise relaunched, being anchored by Sarah-Jane Mee and Jonathan Samuels from Monday to Thursday, and Stephen Dixon with Isabel Webster from Friday to Sunday. As part of these changes, Sunrise was also extended, with the programme now finishing at 10 am.

In August 2017, Sunrise was rebranded, with a new logo; along with this, weekday editions reverted from double-headed to mostly single-headed, with Sarah-Jane Mee presenting most of the slot, and Jonathan Samuels reading the headlines. However, weekend editions remained completely double-headed.

In January 2019, editions of Sunrise that were screened from Sunday to Friday returned to the traditional 6-9am time-frame; Saturday editions continued to run from 6:00-10:00 am as before.

Since 1989, Christmas editions of Sunrise have generally been presented by Kay Burley.

== Studio ==
On 5 February 2009 at 6:00 am, Sunrise began presenting from a new "multi-purpose" area of the Sky News Centre, formally known as the "shoebox". This coincided with the 20th anniversary of Sky News and a revamp for the main studio.

From 10 December 2012, the Sunrise studio was refreshed, with a new blue lit desk and red sofa being introduced. The programme also received a new logo, although it only appeared on the plasma screen in the studio.

On 9 February 2015, Sunrise moved to the main Sky News desk due to their original studio position becoming flooded; this change was soon made permanent.

Between October 2016 and November 2017, Sunrise was broadcast from Studio 21 at Sky Central. The programme returned to Sky News Centre on 18 November, along with the rest of Sky News' output while work was carried out in Studio 21 and Sunrise's new studio was completed.

On 17 January 2018 Sunrise began broadcasting from Studio 6 at Sky Studios. The studio includes a virtual space to allow for segments away from the desk area, along with the sport and weather.

On 13 October 2019, the last episode of Sunrise was broadcast on Sky News, presented by Stephen Dixon and Gillian Joseph. Following the show's demise, weekday anchor Sarah-Jane Mee moved to presenting an afternoon show. Dixon and Joseph, however, continued to present breakfast hour programming in the form of Sky News @ Breakfast.

== Broadcasts ==
Sunrise has been simulcast on Sky One intermittently over the years, most recently in February 2016. The 6:00 am hour was also broadcast daily on Channel 5 from 2002 to 2006, and continued to be shown on Saturdays until 2008.

== Presenters ==
=== Weekday presenters ===
Dates	Presenter One	Presenter Two
1989–91	Penny Smith	Alistair Yates
1991–93	Selina Scott	Michael Wilson
1993–95	Bob Friend	Anna Walker
1995 – March 1999	Martin Stanford	Kay Burley
March 1999 – October 2000	Martin Stanford	Kate Garraway
October 2000 – September 2001	Simon McCoy	Natasha Kaplinsky
September 2001 – February 2002	Simon McCoy	Juliette Foster
February 2002 – September 2002	Simon McCoy	Julie Etchingham
September 2002 – May 2003	Simon McCoy	Various
May 2003 – December 2003	Simon McCoy	Emma Crosby
January 2004 – June 2005	Greg Milam	Lorna Dunkley
June 2005 – October 2005	Stephen Dixon	Lorna Dunkley
October 2005 – January 2007	Eamonn Holmes	Lorna Dunkley
January 2007 – March 2014	Eamonn Holmes	Charlotte Hawkins
March 2014 – October 2016	Eamonn Holmes	Isabel Webster
October 2016 – September 2018	Sarah-Jane Mee	Jonathan Samuels
September 2018 – October 2019	Sarah-Jane Mee	Niall Paterson

=== Weekend presenters ===
Dates	Presenter One	Presenter Two
October 2005 – May 2006	Steve Gaisford	Emma Crosby
May 2006 – September 2006	Stephen Dixon	Emma Crosby
September 2006 – April 2007	Mark Longhurst	Emma Crosby
Late 2006 – April 2007	Mark Longhurst	Helen Fospero
February 2007 – April 2007	Mark Longhurst	Samantha Simmonds
April 2007 – October 2007	Mark Longhurst	Mark Longhurst
October 2007 – December 2011	Mark Longhurst	Gillian Joseph
January 2012 – October 2016	Stephen Dixon	Gillian Joseph
October 2016 - December 2017	Stephen Dixon	Isabel Webster
December 2017 - October 2019	Stephen Dixon	Gillian Joseph

=== Additional presenters ===
Presenter	Area	Notes
Jacquie Beltrao	Sport	Weekday Sport Presenter
Gemma Nash	Sport	Weekend Sport Presenter
Jamie Weir	Sport	Relief Sport Presenter
Nazaneen Ghaffar	Weather	Main Weather Presenter
Isobel Lang	Weather	Weekend Weather Presenter
Jo Wheeler	Weather	Relief
Kirsty McCabe	Weather	Relief

=== Stand-in Presenters ===
Dates	Presenter	Notes
2015–16	Sarah-Jane Mee	Maternity cover for Isabel Webster
25 December	Kay Burley	Burley presented Sunrise on Christmas Day, most years. In 2016 and 2017, she also presented the Boxing Day edition.
December 2017 – October 2019	Gillian Joseph	maternity cover for Isabel Webster
Other Sky News presenters provided short term cover

== Logo gallery ==
Sunrise logos over recent years
Logo used from 2012–15

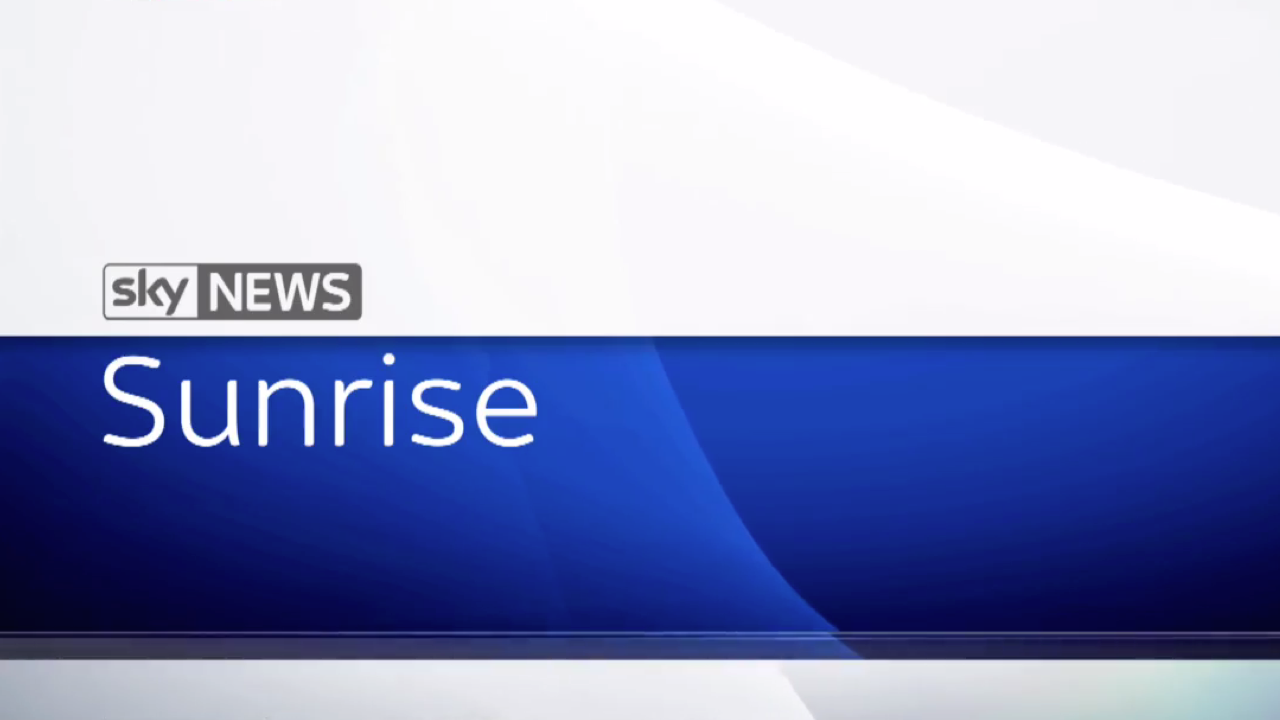
Logo used from 2015–17

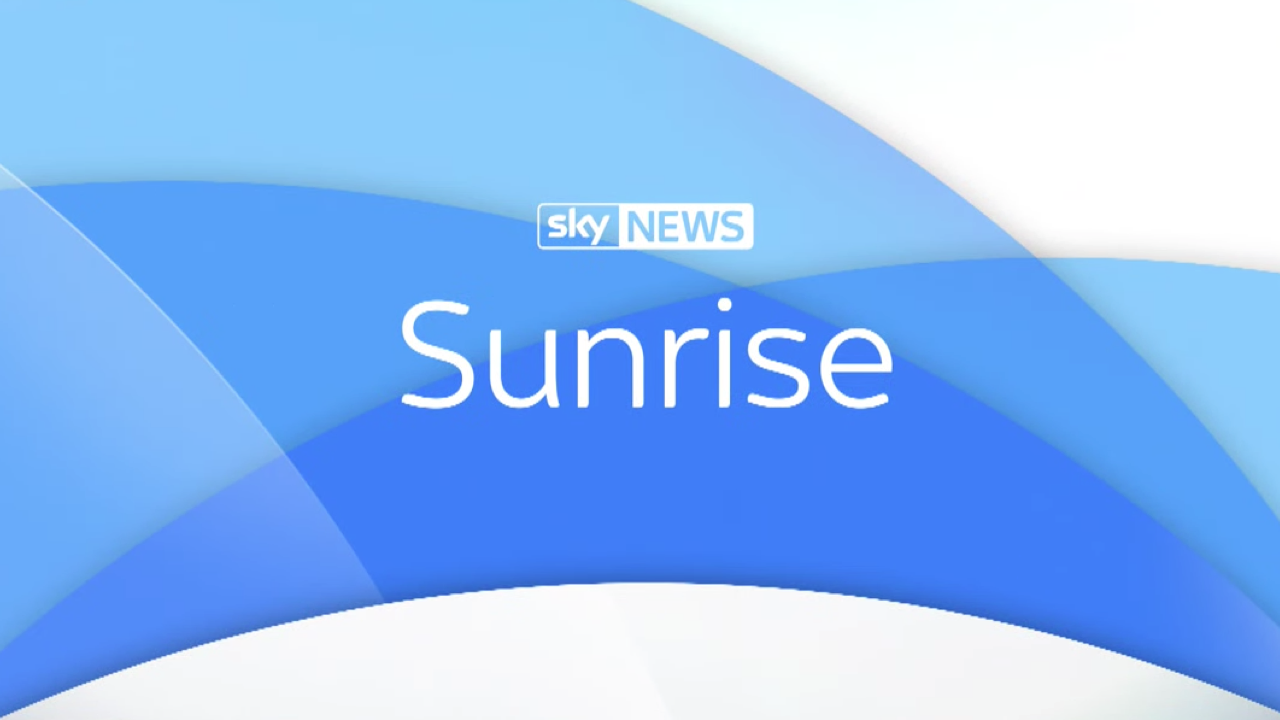
Logo used from 2017–18
