= Lorna Dunkley =

British journalist and news presenter

- Born: 23 February 1972 (age 54); Cirencester, Gloucestershire, England
- Occupation: News presenter
- Years active: 1993–present
- Awards: BT Young Journalist of the Year

Lorna Dunkley (born 23 February 1972 in Cirencester) is an English newsreader, television presenter and journalist. Until July 2016, she was a news anchor for Sky News, Sky's 24-hour television news network and hosted the weekend afternoon slot at 2-5pm. She joined the Australian Broadcasting Corporation, and regularly presents the news on ABC News. She lives in Australia.

== Early years ==
Dunkley was born in Cirencester, Gloucestershire, and when she was six months old her family moved to Cornwall where she grew up.

== Education ==
Dunkley undertook part-time school work with both BBC Radio Cornwall and Pirate FM 102. She graduated in Communication Studies from the University of Glamorgan (now the University of South Wales) and completed a post-graduate course in Broadcast Journalism at University College Falmouth.

== Life and career ==
Dunkley undertook researcher work with ITV Westcountry in Plymouth. She then became a reporter, covering stories including the Devon road protests and the environmentalist Swampy’s eight-day-long underground protest. She then fronted Westcountry Live from 2000.

After going freelance, Dunkley joined Sky News in 2002, and after a period as a reporter presented Sky News Sunrise, Live at Five, Sky News Today and Sky News at Ten, mostly at weekends. She moved from Sky News Sunrise to the weekend presenting line-up, joining Steve Dixon, Mark Longhurst and Chris Roberts. Dunkley left Sky News in July 2016, after a round of job cuts.

In August 2018, Lorna joined the Australian Broadcasting Corporation, and regularly presents the news on ABC News in Australia.

== Recognition ==
Dunkley was named the BT Young Journalist of the Year in 1996, and attended a Buckingham Palace reception as a Young Achiever in Business in 1998.

== Personal life ==
Dunkley has two sisters. She and her husband Brad lived in west London with their two sons James and Ollie before moving to Australia.
