= News, Sport & Weather =

Former television news programme, broadcast on Sky News

- Presented by: Martin Stanford; Mark Longhurst
- Country of origin: United Kingdom

Original release
- Release: 2006 – 2014

News, Sport & Weather is a Sky News programme providing news and sport "every 20 minutes".

During early 2010, the evening weekday NSW broadcasts were covered by various presenters, and had a 15-minute news wraps. From 10 September 2010 these were presented Monday–Friday by Martin Stanford - after the axing of his show SkyNews.com.

In early 2011, Sky News started to scale back this format, with it only existing for one hour in weekdays from 8p.m., and now in 20-minute news wraps. The 9 p.m. hour was replaced by Sky News At Nine and the Press Preview. It was still broadcast for two hours on Friday nights. Bank Holiday editions were replaced by 30-minute Sky News bulletins. In 2014 this format was axed as part of a wider revamp of the Sky News schedule.

== Notable presenters ==
- Martin Stanford
- Mark Longhurst
