= Sky News with Martin Stanford =

Former evening television news programme, broadcast on Sky News

Sky News with Martin Stanford is a news programme on Sky News which ran between 8:00pm and 10:00pm Monday to Friday between July 2006, and February 2007. As the name suggests, it was usually fronted by Martin Stanford. Occasional replacements included Colin Brazier and Martin Popplewell.

The show started on 10 July 2006, after a change in the channel's lineup. It replaced World News Tonight and then an hour of Sky News. It was interactive, encouraging viewers to webcam, send video messages or email to join debates about the day's top stories. The format changed for breaking news and it used different graphics and strings from other Sky News shows.

Following the show's cancellation in February 2007, Stanford moved back to presenting Sky News Today on weekday mornings from nine till noon, alongside Anna Jones.
