= The Sarah-Jane Mee Show =

Afternoon news programme, broadcast weekdays on Sky News

- Genre: News
- Presented by: Sarah-Jane Mee (Monday-Thursday); Belle Donati (Friday)
- Opening theme: Sky News theme
- Country of origin: United Kingdom
- Original language: English

Production
- Production location: Studio 21, Sky Central; Osterley, London
- Camera setup: Multi-camera
- Running time: 180 minutes (Since 2018)

Original release
- Network: Sky News
- Release: 24 October 2005 – 31 August 2023

The Sarah-Jane Mee Show (also known as Sky News with Sarah Hewson) is a weekday news programme in the United Kingdom on Sky News, presented by Sarah-Jane Mee. The slot had been part of the Sky News schedule since 2005, most notably with Kay Burley as presenter until October 2019. It combined rolling-news coverage with debates and interviews on the day's issues plus human interest stories. The show aired between 2 pm–5 pm Monday to Friday. On Fridays, the show title was not used on air, however the same show format was used and presented by Belle Donati.

== Broadcasts ==
The show began in its final format in October 2019 when Kay Burley and Sarah-Jane Mee swapped time slots. Kay took over a shorter self titled breakfast programme whilst Sarah-Jane moved to afternoons at the earlier 2 pm-5 pm slot, with The News Hour with Mark Austin following from 5 pm til 7 pm.

The show was broadcast from the "Glass Box", actually Studio 21, Sky Central, Osterley. It has also been broadcast from the UK party conferences.

From September 2020 to June 2021, The Sarah-Jane Mee Show was branded in programme guides as Sky News with Sarah Hewson as Mee was on maternity leave from Sky News. During this time the typical Friday format was used each weekday (i.e. the programme title was not used while Sarah Hewson was presenting). Isabel Webster hosted the slot on Fridays during this period.

After serving as Friday presenter and relief anchor for many years, Sarah Hewson left Sky News in December 2021.

Mee presented the final episode of the show on 31 August 2023 and replaced with rolling news reports.

=== Final presenters ===
Presenter	Role
Sarah-Jane Mee	Monday-Thursday Presenter
Belle Donati	Friday Presenter
Saima Mohsin	Relief Presenter
Samantha Washington	Relief Presenter

== History ==
Until October 2007, the programme ran for two hours, and aired between 12 pm–2 pm, under the name of Lunchtime Live. Thereafter the programme, known as Afternoon Live ran for 4 hours (1 pm–5 pm) until the launch of The Live Desk in September 2008. From October 2016, the programme was moved to run from 3 pm–6:30 pm, as part of a new schedule. On Friday, as a result of no Ian King Live from 6:30 pm–7 pm, the show ran until 7 pm.

On 11 April 2011 the Afternoon Live name was axed as part of a wider refresh at Sky News; the strand was then simply known as Sky News. It was presented by Sarah Hewson on Friday, or Gamal Fahnbulleh when she is unavailable. Afternoon Live was also the name of a news programme on BBC News between 2 pm–5 pm on weekdays from 9 October 2017 until 17 March 2020 which was usually presented by Simon McCoy.

From September 2018, the afternoon slot on the channel was again rebranded to The Kay Burley Show, broadcast between 2 pm–5 pm, Kay hosted Monday to Thursday, while on Fridays the slot wasn't named The Kay Burley Show as such, but a similar format is used and presented by Sarah Hewson.

In September 2019, Sky News announced changes to their schedule, including Burley moving to present a new breakfast show. As part of the reorganisation, Sunrise presenter Sarah-Jane Mee would move to presenting the afternoon show in Burley's place. The programme was renamed The Sarah-Jane Mee Show on Monday 14 October 2019. Sarah Hewson continued to host each Friday until December 2021 when Hewson decided to leave Sky News. Belle Donati then took over Friday presenting duties.

=== Former names ===
- The Kay Burley Show September 2018 – October 2019
- Sky News with Kay Burley April 2011 – September 2018
- Afternoon Live October 2007 – April 2011
- Lunchtime Live October 2005 – October 2007

Preceded by Sky News Today	Sky News weekday schedule 14:00–17:00	Succeeded by The News Hour with Mark Austin
