= The Live Desk (British TV programme) =

Former television news programme, broadcast on Sky News

- Created by: Sky News
- Presented by: Mon-Thu: Charlotte Hawkins; Fri: Gillian Joseph

Production
- Running time: 1 hour

Original release
- Network: Sky News
- Release: 8 September 2008 – 2011

Related
- Sunrise; Sky Today; Sky Today; Afternoon Live

The Live Desk is a news programme which broadcast on Sky News in the United Kingdom from 8 September 2008 to 2011. Originally, The Live Desk aired twice at 9 am and 1 pm but from 11 January 2011 the Live Desk's 1 pm edition was cancelled and subsequently only one edition was broadcast at 9 a.m., presented by Charlotte Hawkins with Gillian Joseph on Friday. The programme was replaced with a standard Sky News bulletin fronted by the same newscasters later in 2011.

== Format ==
The programme was a 60-minute round-up of the day's news, sport, and business, rather than discussions, interviews, or features. It was loosely based on the Fox News Channel show The Live Desk.

The programme was characterized by the opening line "The Live Desk opens now".

== Presenters ==
At the show's 2008 launch it aired weekdays between 1 pm and 2 pm with Colin Brazier presenting, but on 2 February 2009, The Live Desk added a morning edition, running between 9 am and 10 am. From 11 January 2011, the Live Desk's original 1pm edition was axed in favour of a new political show Boulton & Co with Adam Boulton and Sarah Hewson; the 9 a.m. edition remained until later 2011, presented by Charlotte Hawkins, Monday-Thursday, with Gillian Joseph on Fridays. When individual programme titles (such as Afternoon Live) were dropped by Sky News in 2011, The Live Desk was replaced with a standard 60-minute news bulletin.

=== Replacement presenters ===
When the regular presenters were unavailable the show was hosted by Samantha Simmonds, Sarah Hughes, Stephen Dixon.
