= World News Tonight =

World News Tonight may refer to:

- ABC World News Tonight, the daily evening program of ABC News (United States)
- Sky World News Tonight, a former Sky News program
- World News Tonight, formerly the name used for the late edition of SBS World News
- PTS World News Tonight, a Public Television Service program

== See also ==
- World News Today, a news program on BBC World News
