= The Sky Report =

Former evening television news programme, broadcast on Sky News

The Sky Report is a 60-minute newscast shown every weekday evening on Sky News at 7 pm (GMT), broadcast between October 2005 and July 2006. The programme was hosted by long-standing Sky News presenter Julie Etchingham, and showcased in-depth reports and analysis of the day's top news stories (generally emphasising "hard" news), often devoting significant time to reporting events given little or no coverage on the channel's daytime rolling-news shows.

In February 2006, Anna Botting took over as regular host while Etchingham was on maternity leave. Other stand-in presenters for the show included Colin Brazier, Martin Stanford and Jeremy Thompson.

The Sky Report premiered on the evening of 24 October 2005, as part of a major revamp of the channel, but was axed on 10 July 2006, as part of a minor reshuffle of the channels schedules.
