= News Hour =

The title News Hour or NewsHour may refer to:

- Newshour, the BBC World Service radio flagship programme that premiered in 1988
- Newshour (2006 TV programme), a rolling international news and sports programme on Al Jazeera English that premiered in 2006
- News Hour (Canadian TV program), related local Canadian newscast programs that air on Global, with sister programs such as Noon News Hour and News Hour Final
- News Hour (UK TV programme), a 1993–2009 British breakfast television news programme that aired on GMTV (ITV)
- The News Hour (TV programme), a British television news programme that airs on Sky News since 2018
- PBS NewsHour, an American television news program that has been broadcast on PBS since 1975
- PVO NewsDay, an Australian news programme formerly titled PVO NewsHour
