= Paul Scates =

Writer and activist (b. 1979)

- Born: 18 August 1979 (age 46); Bournemouth, England
- Occupations: Writer, mental health campaigner, presenter
- Years active: 2007–present

Paul Scates (also known as Paul Stephen Scates) is a writer, presenter, and mental health campaigner

== Personal life ==
Scates was born in Bournemouth, England. He speaks openly about having bipolar disorder and surviving child sexual abuse. Following a mental crisis, Scates found himself in and out of medical care.

== Bibliography ==
- That Lightbulb Moment (2019) Published by Trigger Publishing.

== Media appearances ==
- Spendaholics (2006)
- Dinner Date (2012)
- The £100K Drop (2012)
- The World’s Maddest Job Interview (2012)
- Finding Hope - Paul Scates (Documentary) (2014)
- Rachel Bruno: My Dad and Me (2013)
- Sky News Today (2016)
- Granada Reports (2016)
- Head Talks (2017)
- Jeremy Vine (2016)
- Victoria Derbyshire (2016-2017)
- BBC Breakfast (2017)
- 5 News (2017)
- Britains Inspirational Children and Young People’s Awards (2018) - Presenter
- BBC South Today (2018)
- Mind Media Awards (2018)
