= Sophy Ridge on Sunday =

Political discussion programme, broadcast on Sky News

- Genre: Politics
- Presented by: Sophy Ridge
- Country of origin: United Kingdom

Production
- Producer: Ben Sutcliffe
- Production location: Sky Westminster
- Editor: Toby Sculthorp
- Camera setup: Multi-camera
- Running time: 60 minutes (inc. adverts)

Original release
- Network: Sky News
- Release: 8 January 2017 – 16 July 2023

Related
- Murnaghan

Sophy Ridge on Sunday (also Sunday with Niall Paterson) is a Sky News Sunday morning talk show fronted by Sophy Ridge. It aired from 8 January 2017 until 16 July 2023.

Until July 2018, the programme was broadcast from 10:00 am to 11:00 am (with a 30-minute highlights show broadcast at 9:30 pm). It was broadcast at the same time as ITV's Peston on Sunday, until both programmes were rescheduled.

In its final period on air, the programme moved to an even earlier slot of 8:30am to 9:30am and was followed by Sophy Ridge: The Take, a half-hour programme reacting to the interviews from the main programme.

From 10 September 2017 until 29 April 2018, Ridge was on maternity leave, with Niall Paterson fronting the show (rebranded as Sunday with Niall Paterson). Ridge returned on 4 May 2018. On 16 May 2021 she began another period of maternity leave, with Trevor Phillips occupying the slot and the show temporarily renamed Trevor Phillips on Sunday.

As part of Sky News' coverage of the 2019 United Kingdom general election, it was announced that the programme would be broadcast on a Saturday morning as well.

== Format ==
Prime Minister Theresa May was a guest on the first programme. The show has its own graphics, and normally comes from the Sky News Glass Box Studio (Studio 21) in Sky Central. During party conference season, the show is broadcast from the UK's major party conferences. Niall Paterson is usually the relief presenter.

The show features a paper review with two reviewers, and normally includes two interview guests.

== Viewing figures ==
The 18 November 2018 episode, with Prime Minister Theresa May and Leader of the Opposition Jeremy Corbyn, had 187,400 viewers according to BARB.

== Murnaghan ==
Previously, a similar programme called Murnaghan, with Dermot Murnaghan, was broadcast in the 10:00am Sunday slot. In 2017 Murnaghan moved to present Sky News Tonight.
