= The Live Desk =

The Live Desk may refer to:

- The Live Desk (American TV program), a Fox News series airing from 2006 to 2010
- The Live Desk (British TV programme), a Sky News series airing from 2008 to 2011
