= Sky News at Ten =

Evening news programme, broadcast on Sky News

- Genre: News
- Presented by: Anna Botting (Mon-Thurs); Gillian Joseph (Fri-Sun)
- Countries of origin: United Kingdom (Broadcast internationally)
- Original language: English

Production
- Production location: Studio 21, Sky Central; Osterley, London
- Camera setup: Multi-camera
- Running time: 30 minutes
- Production company: Sky plc

Original release
- Network: Sky News
- Release: 8 March 1999 – 25 January 2026

Sky News at Ten (previously branded Sky News at 10, and laterly usually News at Ten) is a long-running nightly news programme on Sky News, that aired between 10:00 pm and 10:30 pm. It is a half-hour round-up of the day's top stories with analysis of their possible impact from the channel's specialists. The show is presented by Anna Botting from Monday to Thursday and Gillian Joseph from Friday to Sunday. The final bulletin aired on 25 January 2026 with The Wrap taking over the 10pm until midnight slot.

== Sky News at Ten ==
=== History ===
The show was originally launched on 8 March 1999 following the axing of ITV's News at Ten. Originally, the show used its own special version of the Sky News graphics and a unique mix of the Sky News theme music, and was presented by Bob Friend and Anna Botting.

Over the years, the programme was presented by many of Sky's presenters; since February 2007, Anna Botting presented the broadcast on weeknights. It was followed at 10:30pm by the Press Preview, where the next morning's newspapers were discussed with two guests.

From late September 2016, the Friday to Sunday slot was filled by Anna Jones, who previously filled in as Anna Botting's maternity cover and as a relief presenter.

The show was rebranded in January 2017 with a new look focused around Big Ben. This change came as ITV News at Ten was pushed back to 10:30 pm temporarily to make way for The Nightly Show, a light entertainment programme.

In April 2021, Anna Jones moved to present The Daily Climate Show on weekday evenings and in summer 2021 Gillian Joseph became the main presenter of weekend editions.

The show's presenter presented from 9:00 pm until midnight, presenting Sky News at 9, the Press Preview at 10:30 pm and 11:30 pm and the News & Press Preview at 11:00 pm. At weekends, the presenter also presented the 8:00 pm hour and headlines at 11:00pm.

=== Presenters ===
Dates	Presenter one	Presenter two	Weekend presenter
March 1999 – September 2000	Bob Friend	Anna Botting	Various
September 2000 – September 2002	Martin Stanford	Vivien Creegor	Various
September 2002 – October 2005	Various presenters		
October 2003 – July 2010	Chris Roberts	Gillian Joseph	Various
July 2006 – February 2007	Martin Stanford	Gillian Joseph	Various
February 2007 – December 2011	Anna Botting		Stephen Dixon
January 2012 – August 2016	Anna Botting		Mark Longhurst
September 2016 – April 2021	Anna Botting		Anna Jones
Summer 2021 – present	Anna Botting		Gillian Joseph

=== Final presenters ===
Presenter	Role
Anna Botting	Monday-Thursday Presenter
Gillian Joseph	Friday-Sunday Presenter
Jonathan Samuels	Relief Presenter
Jayne Secker	Relief Presenter
Barbara Serra	Relief Presenter

Preceded by Sky News at 9	Sky News weekday schedule Sky News at Ten; 22:00–22:30	Succeeded by Press Preview

== Sky News at 11/Press Preview ==
Sky News at Ten
- Also known as: Sky News at 11; Press Preview
- Genre: News
- Presented by: Anna Botting (Mon-Thurs); Gillian Joseph (Fri-Sun)
- Countries of origin: United Kingdom (Broadcast internationally)
- Original language: English

Production
- Production location: Studio 21, Sky Central; Osterley, London
- Camera setup: Multi-camera
- Running time: 30 minutes
- Production company: Sky plc

Original release
- Network: Sky News
- Release: 25 January 2026

The Sky News at Ten presenter also presented the 11 pm hour of Sky News. From Monday to Friday, the hour is branded as News & Press Preview. At weekends, the 11 pm hour is unbranded and uses the generic Sky News brand.

On weekdays, the first thirty minutes features news reports and analysis from correspondents and the Press Preview; there is then a second shorter edition of the Press Preview which focuses on stories not discussed earlier on during the hour. The final part features a pre-recorded sports update and weather.

At weekends, the programme generally using the same running order as Sky News at Ten with the addition of a sports update. The slot used the same backdrop as Sky News at 9 as opposed to the Sky News at Ten backdrop however. The back half hour was followed by a second daily edition of Press Preview. This 11:30 pm edition was repeated during the back half hours of the Sky News from midnight until 3 am. It was also broadcast again at 5:30 am.

=== Final presenters ===
Presenter	Role
Anna Botting	Monday-Thursday Presenter
Gillian Joseph	Friday-Sunday Presenter
Jonathan Samuels	Relief Presenter
Jayne Secker	Relief Presenter
Barbara Serra	Relief Presenter

Preceded by Press Preview	Sky News weekday schedule News & Press Preview; 23:00–23:30	Succeeded by Press Preview
