= Kathy Secker =

British broadcaster (1945–2015)

- Born: Catherine Barnfather; 18 February 1945; Newcastle Upon Tyne, England
- Died: 15 December 2015 (aged 70); Newcastle upon Tyne, England
- Spouse(s): Wally Secker (div. 1990s); James Whiteley (1997–2015)
- Children: 2, including Jayne Secker
- Presenting career
- Show: ITV Tyne Tees
- Station: BBC Radio Newcastle (1994–2015)
- Style: Broadcaster

Kathy Secker (born Catherine Barnfather; 18 February 1945 – 15 December 2015) was a British television and radio broadcaster, best known for her work at Tyne Tees Television and BBC Radio Newcastle. During her early broadcasting career at Tyne Tees (1976–1984) she was usually credited as Cathy Secker.

== Career ==
After she had worked as a secretary to an ENT specialist and as a bank clerk, her husband persuaded her to consider a career as a model, which proved to be successful. Secker became the face of an advertising campaign for the Northern Gas Board. In later years, she also fronted TV adverts for Co-op stores in the North East.

The popularity of the gas board campaign led to Secker being offered a role as a continuity announcer and newsreader for Tyne Tees Television in 1976. Following the 13-week 1979 ITV technicians' strike, Secker was the first presenter back on air on 24 October.

She left the station in 1984, before returning to her continuity role in 1990. Secker was one of Tyne Tees' last locally based announcers — in later years, sharing duties as chief announcer with Bill Steel. She also presented the daily features Lookaround and The Birthday Spot.

When continuity from Newcastle ended in 1996, she made a permanent move to programming, presenting breakfast news bulletins and the magazine show Tonight, alongside her own series, Kathy and Co. Secker also contributed features for the nightly news programme North East Tonight before leaving Tyne Tees in 1998.

In 1994, Secker became a presenter on BBC Radio Newcastle, hosting a Sunday afternoon dedications show. She made her final broadcast on the station on 29 November 2015, just over a fortnight before her death. She also ran her own business, First Impressions, offering women advice on style, beauty and fashion.

She was a founder and patron of Grace House in Sunderland, a charity working across the North East, providing support to disabled children, young people and their families.

== Personal life ==
Secker was raised in Bedlington, Northumberland. She was married to childhood sweetheart Wally Secker from the late 1960s until the early 1990s, when they divorced. She later married Tyne Tees colleague James Whiteley in Kenya in 1997.

She had two children with Wally Secker, a daughter, Jayne (born 1972), who is a presenter on Sky News, and a son, David (born 1975).

== Death ==
On 16 December 2015, it was announced she had died at home in Jesmond the previous day, aged 70. Secker was due to present her BBC Radio Newcastle show the following Sunday. A tribute programme was broadcast on this day, presented by Michael Poulter with messages and memories of Secker from colleagues and listeners.

A funeral service for her was held at the West Road Crematorium, Newcastle, on 30 December 2015.
