= Isabel Webster =

British television presenter and newsreader

- Isabel Webster in 2026
- Education: University of Bristol; City, University of London
- Occupations: Journalist, presenter, newsreader
- Employer(s): BBC News (until 2011); Sky News (2011–2021); GB News (2021–2024)
- Television: Sky News Sunrise
- Spouse: Liam Pearce
- Website: www.isabelwebster.com

Isabel Webster is a British television presenter and newsreader, who co-hosted GB News Breakfast alongside Eamonn Holmes until December 2024.

Until December 2017, Webster co-hosted Sunrise on Sky News, alongside Stephen Dixon.

== Early life and education ==
Webster attended St George's College, Weybridge in Surrey before studying politics and theology at the University of Bristol, and gained a postgraduate diploma in broadcast journalism from City University.

== Career ==
Webster presented and reported on the radio, for local, regional and national BBC News, before joining Sky News in 2011. Webster joined Sky News as their West of England correspondent in 2011, covering stories including the floods, the trials of Ian Watkins and Vincent Tabak as well as the horsemeat scandal.

Webster began working with the national Sky News team in 2012. In early 2014, Webster joined Sky News' breakfast programme Sunrise, replacing Charlotte Hawkins. Her first episode was broadcast on 10 March 2014. She presented primarily on weekdays then transitioned to presenting Friday to Sunday until she left the programme in December 2017. She continued to work for Sky News, generally presenting Friday 2 pm till 5 pm plus Saturday and Sunday 5 pm till 8 pm, and various other shifts including Sky News at Ten and Sky News Today during holidays and absence. On 24 May 2021, Webster announced on her Instagram she had left Sky News. She joined GB News to co-host a weekly news review programme.

Webster presented the Breakfast Show on GB News Breakfast with Eamonn Holmes and Isabel Webster.

In December 2024 it was announced that as part of schedule changes Webster would be leaving GB News.

== Personal life ==
Webster is married to Liam Pearce.
