= David Chater =

British broadcast journalist

- Born: 5 March 1953 (age 73); Meopham, Kent, England
- Education: Maidstone Grammar School, Kent; St John's College, Oxford
- Occupations: Journalist, correspondent, political presenter
- Employer(s): ITN, Sky News, Al Jazeera English
- Known for: ITN: Yugoslavia Correspondent & Middle East Correspondent; Sky News: Moscow Correspondent, Middle East Correspondent & Africa Correspondent; Al Jazeera English: Middle East Correspondent

David Chater (born 1953) is a British broadcast journalist. Chater has more than 35 years' experience in international television news, having worked for Independent Television News, Sky News and Al Jazeera English. He joined ITN in 1976, Sky News in 1993 and Al Jazeera English in 2006. In 2008 he also took time out to serve as Head of News at Georgian television channel Kanal Pik, run under licence by K1.

== Early life and education ==
Chater was born on 5 March 1953 in the large village of Meopham in Kent in South East England. He was educated at Maidstone Grammar School in the county town of Maidstone in Kent, from November 1965 to February 1972, and in later life, he became President of the Old Maidstonian Society.

Immediately after leaving school, he took a Short-Service Limited Commission [SSLC] in the British Army and served briefly as an officer, attached to a regiment of Gurkha Rifles in Hong Kong, Brunei and Sarawak. He read Experimental Psychology at St John's College from 1972 to 1975, graduating with a BA from the University of Oxford.

== Career ==
Print-journalism

Chater began his career working for the local newspaper, the Kent Messenger newspaper, but he stayed with the paper for only a very short time, before joining the broadcaster ITN.

ITN

Chater joined ITN in 1976, as a graduate trainee. Later, he became a scriptwriter and then a Chief Sub-Editor. As a reporter, he worked around the world, covering stories such as the Enniskillen bombing, Lockerbie, the Piper Alpha disaster, the Falklands crisis and Falklands War in 1982 and the Gulf War in 1991.

In 1991, Chater was seriously injured whilst reporting on the front-line in Vukovar during the Yugoslavian conflict, when he was shot in the back by a sniper's bullet. Surgeons saved his life but had to remove one of his kidneys. After making a full recovery he returned to report on the Siege of Sarajevo and the continuing conflict in Bosnia. During his time with ITN, Chater filed stories from Tel Aviv, which was under Scud attack from Iraq during the first Gulf War, and went undercover to report on the opening of the civil war in Sri Lanka.

Sky News

Chater joined Sky News in 1993, and opened its Moscow bureau, becoming its first Moscow Correspondent. He moved to Jerusalem in 1996, becoming Sky News' Middle East correspondent. He was nominated for a Royal Television Society award for his coverage of the continuing conflict in that region. He reported from the conflict in Kosovo and the 1999 war against Slobodan Milosevic.

In 2001, Chater covered the war in Afghanistan after the 9/11 attacks, receiving a Gold Medal from the New York Television Festival for his reports on the siege of Kunduz, jointly with his Sky News colleague Colin Brazier.

In April 2003, during the 2003 invasion of Iraq, Chater reported from the streets of Baghdad before and during the arrival of US forces to the city, stayed throughout Operation Shock and Awe and also covered the Battle for Faluja.

Chater was awarded the Gold Medal for International Reporter of the Year at the New York Television Festival for his coverage of the Second Chechen War during the Siege of Grozny, in which he was caught in the middle of a Grad rocket attack while reporting to camera. The coverage was also nominated for an Emmy Award. He returned to the UK and was assigned to Sky News' Investigative Journalism Unit, and later became Sky News' Africa Correspondent.

In 2006, Chater resigned from Sky News to join Al Jazeera English. The then Head of Sky News, Nick Pollard, said Chater was leaving to pursue "other interests" and praised his "outstanding career" with the channel.

Al Jazeera English

Starting in 2006, Chater has been Al Jazeera English's correspondent in Jerusalem and later Kabul. In Kabul, he documented the reconstruction of Afghanistan. Taking a break - in 2008 - to work in Georgia, Chater returned to concentrate on stories around Europe, frequently reporting from Paris.

Kanal Pik

In 2008, Chater left Al Jazeera to become Head of News at the Kanal Pik television channel in the former Soviet republic of Georgia. Kanal Pik is run under licence by a new production company, K1, co-owned by British broadcasting journalist Robert Parsons. Chater helped the new company bed-in before returning to Al Jazeera English.
