= Anna Botting =

British journalist and television presenter (born 1967)

- Born: Anna Elizabeth Botting; 4 November 1967 (age 58); Cranleigh, Surrey, England
- Education: St Edmund Hall, Oxford; Cardiff University
- Occupation: Newsreader
- Years active: 1991–present
- Known for: Sky News at Ten
- Notable credit: Sky News

Anna Elizabeth Botting (born 4 November 1967) is an English news presenter with Sky News, a broadcasting network based in the United Kingdom. She is the main presenter of Sky News at Ten where she presents the Monday–Thursday editions of the programme alongside Gillian Joseph who presents the weekend editions.

Prior to the channel's rescheduling in July 2006, Botting presented The Sky Report, and from then until February 2007, she presented Sky News from 18:00 to 20:00 alongside Jeremy Thompson.

== Background ==
Botting, born in Cranleigh, Surrey, is the daughter of Douglas Botting, explorer and author, and Louise Botting, a company director and former broadcaster. She studied Geography at St Edmund Hall, Oxford University, before deciding to pursue a career in journalism. She took a postgraduate course in journalism at Cardiff University, before beginning work in Manchester as a researcher for a social action show for Granada Television. In 1991, Botting took a job with BBC North as a reporter for radio and TV. From here she became a presenter for the local news programme, Look North.

Botting joined Sky News in 1995, meaning that she is now one of the network's longest-serving presenters. She has presented a wide range of programmes on Sky, including: Sky News Today, Sky News at Ten, Live at Five, Sky News Tonight and The Sky Report.

== Career at Sky ==
Anna Botting joined Sky News in 1995 as a reporter, before moving into the studio to anchor the news. During the 1997 election Botting shadowed Liberal Democrat leader Paddy Ashdown, day-in day-out, for the whole six weeks of the campaign. She was also the first journalist to arrive at Kensington Palace on the day Diana, Princess of Wales died.

Botting also covered the death of Pope John Paul II and anchored coverage of the wars in Afghanistan and Iraq from the studio. She was presenting on air when Serbian leader Slobodan Milosevic was ousted from office.

In summer 2006, whilst anchoring from Israel, Botting interviewed the British politician George Galloway about the Israel-Lebanon war. Galloway criticised Sky News, News Corporation and Botting in person for being biased towards Israel.

Anna Botting notably won the Royal Television Society's news presenter of the year award in May 2012 and became the second woman to do so; this followed her return from Japan and location anchoring work for Sky News following the tsunami of March 2011. She reported from Fukushima Nuclear Power Station and northwest Honshu Island in the aftermath of the disaster. Botting also anchored on location during the battle of Tripoli in 2011.

Botting had notably worked alongside the former Sky presenter Bob Friend before her popular partnership with Jeremy Thompson on Live at Five took off.

Botting appeared as herself in the 2014 science fiction action film Edge of Tomorrow, which stars Tom Cruise and Emily Blunt.

Botting led Sky News' coverage of the Funeral of Elizabeth II with Alastair Bruce on 19 September 2022.

== Personal life ==
A keen rower during her time at university, Botting took part in BBC Three's The Other Boat Race. She was one of twelve public figures and Oxbridge alumni who trained and competed in their own version of the annual rowing event. She captained the Oxford crew and her team won the contest.

Preceded by Jon Snow	RTS: Television Journalism; Presenter of the Year; 2012	Succeeded by Incumbent
