= Marverine Cole =

British radio and television presenter and news reporter

Marverine Cole is a British radio and television presenter and news reporter from Birmingham, England.

Of Jamaican descent, she made history as one of the ten Black British women to have ever presented national and international news bulletins in the UK during the last 40 years. Peers amongst others include Moira Stuart, Gillian Joseph, Lukwesa Burak, Sharon Grey, Joyce Ohaja, Claudia-Liza Vanderpuije, Charlene White.

Marverine has been a television news anchor for BBC Midlands Today, and ITV Central News in Birmingham, and also Sky News, 5 News and Arise News (an African-focused news channel) in London. Joining Sky News, she presented the World News and Business Report overnight slot, reporting on breaking news stories like the 2008 Mumbai terror attacks. She is also said to be the first Black female presenter on TV shopping channel QVC UK during their twenty year history when she joined them in 2013.

She studied for a degree in business studies at De Montfort University (graduating in 1993), and a postgraduate diploma in broadcast journalism at the University of Central England in Birmingham.

Working in radio, she produced Ladies with Lyrics, a documentary about UK female rappers for BBC Radio 1Xtra, and a documentary for BBC Radio 4 about female gambling addicts. In 2019, she won the award of Journalist of the Year at the Mind Media Awards in 2019 for another BBC Radio 4 documentary about mental health, Black Girls Don't Cry.

She is Britain's first Black female beer sommelier (accredited by the UK Beer and Cider Academy), often appears on TV doing live beer tastings for ITV's Love Your Weekend and This Morning. She is a beer podcaster and appears as a beer expert in the media—including a special edition of Countdown, during Channel 4's Black to Front Day. She is the beer columnist for BBC Good Food magazine and online.

In 2021, she became a stand-in presenter for Classic FM, and also as a regular friend on the popular Channel 4 daytime show, Steph's Packed Lunch.

She is a board member of Birmingham Royal Ballet and The Student View. She is also an ambassador for West Midlands screen body, Create Central.
