= Steve Gaisford =

British news presenter

- Education: University of Surrey
- Presenting career
- Country: United Kingdom
- Previous shows: London Tonight (ITV); Sunrise (Sky News); Good Morning Sports Fans (Sky News); Breakfast Show (Setanta Sports News); South East Today (BBC South East)

Steve Gaisford is a British former news presenter who primarily worked for Sky News.

In September 2009, Gaisford launched a new company Chloros which focuses on using well-known faces as online web presenters.

== Career ==
Gaisford's on-screen career began when he became Five's first-weekend sports presenter before moving on to work for GMTV and ITV's London Tonight programme.

Gaisford worked for nine years at Sky News and is best known for anchoring the weekend Sky News Sunrise programme with Emma Crosby from October 2005 through to his departure from the channel in April 2007. He presented news and sports programmes for the Sky network, initially appearing in 1998 on Sky Sports News.

Gaisford has covered many breaking news stories, including the Asian tsunami, The death of Pope John Paul II and the Madrid train bombings and from the world of sport including the live media circus that was David Beckham signing for Real Madrid.

After leaving Sky News, Gaisford became a regular face on ITV, presenting the ITV News at 5:30 and still anchors ITV London's London Tonight weekend news programmes worked alongside former Sky colleague Barbara Serra on Al Jazeera English. Gaisford also hosted 'The Breakfast Show' each weekday morning alongside Ali Douglas on the Setanta Sports News channel until the channel closed in June 2009.

He currently works as Communications Lead at the Minderoo Foundation.

== Personal life ==
Gaisford is the brother of Good Morning Britain's chief correspondent Richard Gaisford.
