= Sky News Tonight =

Evening news programme, broadcast weekdays on Sky News

- Genre: News
- Presented by: Various presenters (Monday-Friday); Sophy Ridge (Friday)
- Opening theme: Sky News theme
- Countries of origin: United Kingdom (Broadcast internationally)
- Original language: English

Production
- Production locations: Millbank, Westminster
- Camera setup: Multi-camera
- Running time: 120 minutes (Monday-Wednesday), 60 minutes (Thursday), 90 minutes (Friday)
- Production company: Sky plc

Original release
- Network: Sky News
- Release: 1 September 2014 – 1 September 2023

Sky News Tonight is a weeknight news programme broadcast on Sky News from 7:00 pm. First aired on 1 September 2014, it was Sky's flagship newscast, featuring special reports, in-depth analysis and interviews. The show's last episode was broadcast on 1 September 2023, 9 years to the day since the show began

== History and Broadcasts ==
From 21 April 2016, Sky News ended the show at 8 pm on Thursday to make room for the debate show The Pledge, which was axed in 2020, meaning Sky News Tonight regained this full slot.

From 26 September 2016, as part of a new schedule change, Dermot Murnaghan has presented Sky News Tonight from Monday to Thursday, with Sophy Ridge presenting on Fridays. Murnaghan left Sky News in February 2023.

The programme was formerly presented by Adam Boulton and Sarah Hewson. Various presenters have acted as relief when the main presenters are unavailable.

=== Current presenters ===
| Presenter | Role |
|---|---|
| Various presenters | Monday-Thursday Presenter |
| Sophy Ridge | Friday Presenter |
| Jonathan Samuels | Relief Presenter |
| Jayne Secker | Occasional Relief Presenter |

| Preceded by The News Hour with Mark Austin | Sky News weekday schedule 19:00–21:00 | Succeeded by Sky News at 9 |
