= Rob Powell (journalist) =

British Journalist & Sky News Political Correspondent

- Born: 1987 (age 38–39)
- Education: University of Westminster, University of Liverpool
- Occupation: Political correspondent
- Years active: 2007–present
- Employer: Sky News

Rob Powell is a political correspondent of Sky News since 2019, the 24-hour television news service operated by Sky Television.

== Career ==
In 2007 Powell was appointed as an intern with Bauer Media before moving to the BBC in 2010. He worked at the BBC for several years as a reporter and presenter for BBC South Daily, before joining Sky at their Westminster studio to cover the EU referendum and 2017 election.
