= SkyNews.com =

Former evening television news programme, broadcast on Sky News

- Created by: Martin Stanford
- Presented by: Martin Stanford
- Country of origin: United Kingdom

Production
- Running time: 30 minutes

Original release
- Network: Sky News
- Release: 2 October 2007 – 10 September 2010

SkyNews.com, formerly Sky.com News, was a nightly half-hour television news programme which was broadcast between 2007 and 2010, at 7pm weekdays on Sky News in the United Kingdom. It was the first British news programme to be solely dedicated to Internet led news and was hosted by Martin Stanford. The show was cancelled in 2010, with the last edition airing on 10 September 2010. The slot was replaced with a one-hour edition of Jeff Randall Live, which previously aired after SkyNews.com at 7.30pm.

== History ==
The programme was launched in October 2007, and focused on the popular news stories on the Sky News website, as well as the Internet as a whole. In February 2008, Sky.com News won a Royal Television Society award for its innovative approach to news and for letting "the public rather than the news editor set the agenda.” The programme was streamed live through the Sky News website, and whilst the television programme went to a commercial break, Stanford would give the online audience additional content.

On 8 September 2008, Sky.com News became SkyNews.com (in line with a web address change for Sky News, which has since been superseded by news.sky.com) and moved to the 7pm slot each weekday, running until 7.30pm. The show previously ran from 7.30-8pm Tuesday to Friday.

On 1 September 2010, Martin Stanford announced via his Twitter page that the show had been axed and would cease broadcasting on Friday 10 September.

== Categories ==
- Most clicked - The top stories on SkyNews.com
- Movers - Martin and a guest blogger chat about hot topics
- Buzz - A guest debate with web agenda
- Most searched - The top searched words on SkyNews.com
- Video - Current popular web videos
