= LBC News =

- London; England
- Broadcast area: United Kingdom
- Frequencies: DAB+: 11D/12A Digital One; Sky (UK only): 0141

Programming
- Format: News

Ownership
- Owner: Global
- Sister stations: LBC

History
- First air date: 5 October 1994; 31 years ago
- Former names: London Newstalk (1994–1996); LBC 1152 (1996–2002); LBC News 1152 (2002–2015); LBC London News (2015–2019)
- Former frequencies: AM: 1152 kHz (London)

Links
- Webcast: Global Player
- Website: www.lbcnews.co.uk

LBC News is a British digital radio station owned and operated by Global. The sister station of LBC, it broadcasts rolling news 24 hours a day nationwide on DAB and Global Player. Until Wednesday 30 October 2024, the station broadcast on analogue radio in Greater London on 1152 AM.

== History ==
The 1152 AM frequency in London has a complicated history of format and ownership. Continuous news radio in London dates from the early 1990s. In September 1993, London News Radio was awarded the AM and FM licences previously held by LBC. They proposed a continuous news service on FM and a news/talk format on AM.

By the time the licence was due to start in October 1994, London News Radio had been through several upheavals, first acquiring LBC and then itself being bought up by Reuters. At launch on 5 October 1994, the company was known as London Radio Services and it operated London News 97.3FM and London News Talk 1152AM. London News initially operated on a 20-minute wheel. The first presenters on air were Michael Wilson and Clare Catford. The morning sequence was presented by LBC veteran Jonathan Staples with Nicky Broyd the afternoon presenter. Drivetime was in the hands of Christopher Terry and Brenda Ellison. John Terrett was the evening host.

By spring 1995, the rolling news format gave way to a more traditional schedule of news sequences and magazine programmes. The station name was shortened to News 97.3 in the summer. In 1996, Reuters sold London Radio Services to the newly formed London News Radio (unrelated to the previous LNR company), in which ITN, DMGT, Reuters and GWR Group held equal shares. In summer 1996, the station reverted to a rolling news format, initially with no name (the station was branded as 97.3FM). In the autumn, following a move to ITN's headquarters, the station was relaunched as News Direct 97.3FM and Chris Mann was appointed editor.

In 2000 the station was renamed ITN News Direct 97.3FM. In late 2002, following the sale of the station to Chrysalis Radio, the station dropped the ITN prefix and returned to its previous name until the rebrand as LBC News 1152. During Christmas and New Year 2002/03 an LBC News-branded rolling news service was carried on both 97.3FM and 1152AM prior to the full launches of LBC 97.3 and LBC News 1152, swapping the frequencies of the news and talk stations.

In Spring 2007, it was announced that the station would be replaced by Sky News Radio. This move came alongside Channel 4's 4 Digital Group second DAB multiplex bid. On 18 October 2007, the station's new owners Global Radio announced that they and Sky had scrapped a joint venture to turn LBC News 1152 into a 24-hour Sky News branded station.

In Summer 2008, the 1152 service was substantially cut back. The overnight automated service was abandoned and replaced with a simulcast of LBC 97.3. The daytime service became semi-automated, with much greater reliance on recorded audio from LBC's FM talk station and Sky News. LBC's five-and-a-half-year relationship with business news provider Bloomberg was also abandoned in favour of business updates from CNBC. On 15 November 2010, LBC News 1152 was added to the Sky and Virgin Media EPGs, with the station using channel slots formerly occupied by Galaxy Yorkshire. This came six weeks ahead of Galaxy's rebranding to Capital FM.

In January and February 2012, the station reverted to live presentation throughout the day with a format of headlines every 15 minutes. For the previous four years parts of the daytime schedule had been automated.

In January 2015, LBC News 1152 changed its name to LBC London News and moved to a 20-minute wheel of news, with headlines at :00, :20 and :40 minutes past each hour, and key presenters including Jim Diamond on breakfast and Chris Golds on drivetime.

On 28 October 2019, LBC London News changed name to LBC News. While it remained on 1152AM in the London area for a further five years, it has been available since that date on DAB+ via the D1 multiplex nationwide using the space vacated by Radio X switching to DAB+. It has reverted to a 24-hour station dropping its simulcast of LBC but otherwise keeping the same format of 20 minute bulletins but with a UK wide focus.

LBC News announced it would stop broadcasting on medium wave from the end of October 2024 as part of Global’s strategy to switch off all AM transmitters across the UK as listening moves to digital platforms, marking the end of 49 years of broadcasting (a different frequency was used from 1973–75) on the former AM frequency of the first Independent Local Radio, LBC (London Broadcasting Company).

For the last twelve days of broadcasting on AM on air, a closedown announcement was played out on the frequency at the end of the advert break before the Top of the Hour news bulletin, warning listeners that they would no longer be able to listen to LBC News on AM in London and advising them to retune to digital platforms to continue listening.

Broadcasting of regular programmes on 1152 AM ceased on Wednesday 30 October 2024 at 10:00AM and a closedown loop, an edited version of the closedown announcement, was played out on the frequency, informing listeners that LBC News was no longer available on 1152 AM in London and redirecting them to digital platforms to continue listening. The AM transmitter then permanently ceased broadcasting and fell silent at 3:00PM on Thursday 31 October 2024.

== Programming ==
From 28 October 2019, LBC News has broadcast 24 hours a day having previously simulcasted LBC during the evening and overnight – however programming is automated between 11pm and 6am.

90-second news bulletins are updated hourly through the night from "Global's Newsroom" which provides news to all Global stations.

Following the decision by BBC Radio 5 Live to drop the reading of the classified football results from the start of the 2022–23 season, the station broadcasts the IRN network classified results read by Colin Besley live every Saturday afternoon at 17:10.

The station's suppliers include Sky News Radio and INRIX Media.

== Listeners ==
In Q3 2019, LBC London News had a record reach of 612,000 listeners every week, who listen for around 5.3 hours a week. Since Q1 2006, the station has shown consistent growth in terms of people listening, and roughly static total hours.

As of December 2023, LBC News and LBC London News broadcast to a combined weekly audience of 1.2 million, according to RAJAR.
