= The News Hour (TV programme) =

Early evening news programme, broadcast weekdays on Sky News

- Also known as: The News Hour with Mark Austin; The News Hour with Jonathan Samuels
- Genre: News
- Presented by: Mark Austin (Monday-Thursday); Jonathan Samuels (Friday-Sunday)
- Opening theme: Sky News theme
- Country of origin: United Kingdom
- Original language: English

Production
- Production location: Studio 21, Sky Central; Osterley, London
- Camera setup: Multi-camera
- Running time: 120 minutes (Mon-Fri, since 2018)

Original release
- Network: Sky News
- Release: 24 September 2018 – present

The News Hour with Mark Austin is a news programme in the United Kingdom on Sky News, presented by Mark Austin. It combines rolling-news coverage with analysis and interviews on the day's issues. The show airs between 5 pm–7 pm Monday to Sunday. Jonathan Samuels is the main presenter on Fridays and weekends.

== Broadcasts ==
The News Hour was the name initially given to the 5pm hour of Sky News only with Sky News at Six following after, also presented by Austin. As of 2020, the 6 pm hour is branded as the News Hour at Six The show is broadcast as two distinctive hour long programmes with the days news summarised in each.

Mark Austin presents most Monday to Thursday programmes and occasionally hosts the show on Fridays, however, typically Jonathan Samuels presents most Friday and weekend editions.

The show is currently broadcast from the "Glass Box", actually the Studio 21, Sky Central, Osterley. but during the 2022 Russian invasion of Ukraine, the show was presented live from Kyiv

=== Presenters ===
Presenter	Role
Mark Austin	Monday-Thursday Presenter
Jonathan Samuels	Friday-Sunday Presenter
Saima Mohsin	Relief Presenter
Barbara Serra	Relief Presenter

Preceded by Business Live with Ian King	Sky News weekday schedule 17:00–19:00	Succeeded by Politics Hub with Sophy Ridge
