= Vivien Creegor =

British television presenter

Vivien Creegor (born c. 1959) is an English television newscaster. From 1989 until 2006, she was one of the principal news readers on Sky News.

== Broadcasting career ==
Creegor started her career as a secretary with the BBC and eventually became a production assistant for BBC Radio Drama and an abridger for the BBC Radio 4 programme, A Book at Bedtime. She became a newsreader on British television on BBC1 and BBC2 and on radio on BBC Radio 4: she was a main presenter on Points West during much of the 1980s.

In 1988, she joined the fledgling Sky News, eventually becoming the news anchor with Bob Friend. She remained at Sky until 2006, when she was released, according to the management, "to make way for new faces".

== Acting career ==
After leaving Sky News, Creegor moved into acting, beginning with a cameo role as a news reporter in the 2006 British-made movie Stormbreaker. She also appeared in the play Alfie at Barons Court Theatre and as a nun in the film adaptation of Tony Hawks' Round Ireland with a Fridge.

== Other activities ==
Creegor has written several articles for the London Evening Standard and the Daily Mail and also worked for many years with the United Nations, frequently as a Goodwill Ambassador. In addition, for several years, she presented the Millennium Child of Achievement Forum. As of 2009, Creegor was living in Hampstead, London.
