= Juliette Foster =

British journalist (born 1964)

Juliette Foster (born 11 February 1964) is a British journalist and television news presenter.

After graduating from the University of Wales, Lampeter, she trained as a Radio Journalist at the London College of Printing. Her first job was as a freelance reporter for BBC Radio London. A year later she managed to get her first job in television as a researcher for the BBC current affairs programme "Brass Tacks" and one year on, was one of six employees selected by the BBC to train as television reporters. In 1990, she left the BBC and joined the breakfast television channel TV-am as a production journalist. When TV-am lost their franchise to broadcast, Foster moved back to freelance work, before spending 5 years in the City working for the US business broadcaster, Bloomberg.

In 2001, she was offered a position at Sky News and co-anchored some of the main news programmes including the morning show, Sunrise, as well as Live at Five, the nine o’clock news, Sky News at Ten.

In 2006 she founded Magnus Communications, offering Media Strategy

She is currently back in the City, working for BBC News. More recently, she has taken on a wider role at BBC World News, presenting the business news either from the studio or from the London Stock Exchange, as a cover presenter of World News Today: Business Edition (Weekdays 22:00 GMT) and as a duty newscaster at weekends as well as providing cover during the week. She also presents Shares Perspectives from 1-5pm weekdays on Share Radio.
