= Bob Friend (newscaster) =

Bob Friend MBE
- Born: Robert Friend; 20 January 1938
- Died: 8 October 2008 (aged 70)
- Occupations: Journalist, British Army Officer, Presenter, Newsreader
- Notable credit(s): BBC Radio 4's Today programme First permanent BBC Australia correspondent BBC Breakfast; Sky News

Bob Friend, MBE (20 January 1938 – 8 October 2008) was one of the original news anchors for the Sky News channel from its launch in 1989 until his retirement in late 2003.

== Journalism career ==
=== Early days ===
After completing his education at the Skinners' School, Friend started his career in 1953 aged 15 as a cub reporter on the Tunbridge Wells Advertiser, reporting on the Queen Elizabeth II's Coronation. After he undertook National Service as a corporal clerk with the Brigade of Gurkhas in Hong Kong, Friend served a ten-year freelance career in various British newspapers before starting his broadcast career with BBC News in 1969.

=== BBC News ===
Starting out as the Northern Ireland correspondent of the Radio 4's Today programme, Friend served four years in Northern Ireland witnessing sectarian violence at the start of The Troubles. After a short stint in Vietnam he got his first official overseas TV posting as the BBC's first Australia correspondent in 1973, five years as the BBC's Tokyo correspondent, and finally New York City as BBC Breakfast correspondent where his producer was Mark Thompson, who went on to become Director-General of the BBC.

=== Sky News ===
After 20 years with the BBC, Friend returned to the United Kingdom to work on the start-up Sky News. Friend's first appearance on Sky News was on 2 February 1989 alongside Kay Burley, but his best known on-screen partner was Anna Botting, and they became one of channel's most popular news duos.

Friend became the best recognised face of Sky News, and as a result of being spotted by Tom Cruise while he watched Sky News on a short visit to London, Friend had cameos in a number of 1990s films, including Independence Day and Mission Impossible.

=== Radio ===
Friend was a guest presenter on LBC News 1152 during the 2005 United Kingdom general election.

== Honours ==
In June 2003, Friend was awarded an MBE for services to broadcasting in the Queen's Birthday Honours List, shortly before his retirement presenting alongside Vivien Creegor on 23 October, nearly 15 years after his first appearance.

== Personal life ==
Friend was married with two daughters. He died on 8 October 2008 from a brain tumour.

== Tributes ==
Chairman and CEO of News Corporation Rupert Murdoch paid personal tribute to Friend:

Bob was a distinguished journalist and an admired broadcaster. He was quick to understand the power of non-stop programming. He was there at the beginning of that long, hard road we all had to travel to make Sky News what it is today.

== Memorial Scholarship ==
The University of Kent's Centre for Journalism has had for many years, since 2009, the Sky News Bob Friend Memorial Scholar. Several previous scholars now work from KM News, Daily Mail Newspaper and Sky News. The annual scholarship of 2013 was presented to Georgia Fry by Neil Dunwoodie, Executive Producer Sky News, at the 2013 Bob Friend Memorial Lecture (by Stephanie Flanders BBC Economics editor ) at the Pilkington Lecture Theatre at the University of Kent's Medway Campus in Chatham.

== Partial filmography ==
- Mission: Impossible (1996) - Sky News Man
- Independence Day (1996) - Himself - 'Sky News' Anchorman (uncredited)
- Quicksand (2003) - Newscaster (final film role)
