= Charlotte Hawkins =

English broadcaster and journalist (born 1975)

- Born: Charlotte Mary Hawkins; 16 May 1975 (age 51); Chichester, West Sussex, England
- Education: University of Manchester
- Occupations: Journalist, presenter, newsreader
- Employer(s): ITV Breakfast, Classic FM, ITV News
- Agent(s): M&CSaatchi Merlin
- Television: Meridian Tonight (2001–2006); Sky News Sunrise (2007–2014); Good Morning Britain (2014– ) ITV News (2025–)
- Spouse: Mark Herbert (m. 2008)
- Children: 1
- Website: www.charlottehawkins.com

Charlotte Mary Hawkins (born 16 May 1975) is a British television and radio presenter, newsreader and journalist.

Hawkins joined ITV's Meridian Tonight in 2003, hosting its main news programme, leaving in 2006 to become co-presenter of Sky's breakfast programme Sunrise with Eamonn Holmes. In 2014, she left Sky to co-present the ITV Breakfast programme Good Morning Britain. She also presents a Sunday evening programme on Classic FM.

She was a contestant in the fifteenth series of Strictly Come Dancing but was eliminated in the fourth week.

== Early life ==
Hawkins was born on 16 May 1975 in Chichester, West Sussex. She attended the Bishop Luffa School in Chichester, and the University of Manchester, graduating with a BA in English Literature. She later undertook a Postgraduate Diploma in Broadcast Journalism from the London College of Printing.

== Career ==
=== Journalism ===
Hawkins began her broadcasting career with ITN in 1999 as a newsreader and reporter for LBC Radio. She was one of the first journalists at the fatal Paddington rail crash and provided live reports from the scene. In January 2000, she moved to ITV Meridian in the South East of England where she co-presented the hour-long current affairs series The Big Story.

From 2001, Hawkins worked for ITV Meridian as co-anchor of their main news programme Meridian Tonight. She also presented on the ITV News Channel. At Meridian, she presented several pan-regional documentaries, including the half-hour special Britain on the Move. In 2007, Hawkins co-presented The London Boat Show for ITV.

Hawkins left Meridian in December 2006 to join Sky News in January 2007, where she presented Sunrise each Monday to Thursday with Eamonn Holmes. In March 2014 she left the channel.

Hawkins presented several stints on Five News, in the absence of stand-in Matt Barbet who was providing maternity leave cover for main presenter Natasha Kaplinsky, for a period in 2010. In 2010, she was an occasional guest news reviewer on the ITV programme This Morning. Hawkins also presented the Sky Arts documentary Andre Rieu: Behind the Music.

On 3 March 2014, Hawkins was confirmed as a presenter on ITV Breakfast programme Good Morning Britain. She made her last appearance on Sky News Sunrise on 6 March 2014 and made her debut on Good Morning Britain on 28 April 2014, where she co-hosts the show with Ben Shephard, Sean Fletcher and Susanna Reid from 6:00 am to 8.30 am, every day except Thursdays.

On 22 January 2015, Hawkins presented her final show before taking maternity leave; she returned on the show on 15 June. As of 2017, Hawkins serves as newsreader on Good Morning Britain four mornings a week and covers as a main presenter during holidays and absence.

In August 2017, Hawkins took part in the fifteenth series of Strictly Come Dancing on BBC One, where she was paired with professional dancer Brendan Cole. They were eliminated in the fourth week of the competition.

From 7 January 2018, Hawkins presented her own Classic FM music show on Sunday afternoons from 3–5pm; from 5 January 2020, this slot was taken over by John Humphrys and Hawkins moved to the Smooth Classics at Seven slot.

Since 6 January 2020, Hawkins has anchored the first 30 minutes of Good Morning Britain on Monday, Tuesday, and Friday; the programme's air time had been extended. Since January 2022, Hawkins role has been reduced to being newsreader on Wednesdays and Fridays.

As Good Morning Britain moves to be produced by ITN, Hawkins was repositioned to be a stand in newsreader behind Susanna Reid, Kate Garaway and Ranvir Singh, In this time she also began occasionally presenting ITV Lunchtime News, ITV Evening News ITV News At Ten and ITV Weekend News

=== Other work ===
On 20 November 2020, she announced via her Twitter that she was releasing a classical music album called Mindful Moments in time for Christmas. It is a selection of her favourite pieces of classical music and is dedicated to her late father, Frank.

In November 2024, she began presenting a podcast focusing on dog training titled Leaps and Hounds.

== Personal life ==
Hawkins married her partner of five years, Mark Herbert, on 23 August 2008. The ceremony took place at Chichester Cathedral, where Hawkins' father was a clergyman and was performed by her uncle, the Rt Revd Richard Hawkins. On 12 August 2014, Hawkins announced live on Good Morning Britain that the couple were expecting their first child. On 8 February 2015, she gave birth to a girl.

Hawkins lives in Surrey. She spends a lot of her time outdoors, and enjoys horse riding, cycling and sailing.

=== Charity ===
Hawkins supports several charities including the Motor Neurone Disease Association of which she is a patron. She is a patron of Ellenor Hospice and an ambassador for Cancer Research UK Kids and Teens.

Charlotte Hawkins annually hosts the Wards Children's Awards, which celebrate the triumphs of young people and families across Kent.

Hawkins supports the Dogs Trust charity. In 2013, she owned a rescue dog named Bailey, which was adopted from the Dogs Trust.

== Filmography ==
Television

| Year | Title | Role | Channel | Notes |
|---|---|---|---|---|
| 2000 | The Big Story | Presenter | ITV Meridian | |
| 2001–2006 | Meridian Tonight | Presenter | ITV Meridian | |
| 2007 | The London Boat Show | Presenter | ITV Meridian | |
| 2007–2014 | Sunrise | Presenter | Sky News | With Eamonn Holmes |
| 2010 | Five News | Stand-in presenter | Channel 5 | |
| 2010 | This Morning | Newspaper reviewer | ITV | 2 episodes |
| 2014— | Good Morning Britain | Presenter & newsreader | ITV | |
| 2015–2025 | Lorraine | Occasional correspondent | ITV | |
| 2017 | Strictly Come Dancing | Participant | BBC One | Series 15; eliminated on Week 4 |
| 2017 | A Classic Christmas | Presenter | Sky Arts | One-off Christmas show |
| 2017– | ITV Racing | Reporter | ITV | |
| 2025– | ITV News | Relief Newscaster | ITV | ITV Lunchtime News, ITV Evening News, ITV Weekend News |

Guest appearances

- Pointless Celebrities (2011)
- This Morning (2014, 2015) – guest
- The British Soap Awards (2014)
- Let's Do Lunch with Gino & Mel (2014)
- Celebrity Squares (2014)
- Tipping Point for Text Santa (2014)
- The Chase: Celebrity Special (2015)
- Celebrity Juice (2015)
- Britain's Got More Talent (2015)
- Countdown (2016)
- Who's Doing the Dishes? (2016)
- All Star Mr & Mrs (2016)
- Celebrity Storage Hunters (2016)
- Richard Osman's House of Games (2020)
- Richard Osman's House of Games (2021)
- James Martin's Saturday Morning (2021)
- Mastermind (2025)
- The Weakest Link (2025)

Film

| Year | Title | Role | Notes |
|---|---|---|---|
| 2015 | Burnt | TV Presenter | |
| 2017 | Sharknado 5: Global Swarming | Herself | Cameo role |
