= Michael Wilson (presenter) =

British TV presenter

Michael Wilson is a British TV presenter.

He began his television career at Thames Television in 1979, and in 1987 founded The City Programme. In the 1990s, he also presented London News Radio's Breakfast Show and helped launch Reuters Financial Television.

Wilson joined Sky News in 1989 and was part of the Sky News team for the 1992 United Kingdom general election. Wilson left in late 1992, to become a presenter on GMTV, where he presented the first weekday programme with Fiona Armstrong. Their partnership did not last long as ratings lowered. Fiona left and Wilson founded the 6-7am GMTV News Hour, with Eamonn Holmes and Lorraine Kelly taking up the Monday to Friday roles as main GMTV presenters, with Anne Davies as newsreader and relief presenter. The News Hour broke television early morning viewing records by achieving one million viewers in less than six months.

In 1995, Wilson returned to Sky News and stayed until 2009, as Business Editor and launched Sky Business Report.

Since leaving Sky News, he has returned to GMTV, where he has been given a reporting role as a business analyst. Michael has also regulalrly appeared on Arise news as a business analyst. He is also broadcasting on other platforms, chairing international conferences and has been commissioned to write a book about the post-recession world.
