= Live at Five (Sky News programme) =

Former early evening television news programme, broadcast on Sky News

Sky News at Five (formerly Live at Five) and Sky News at Six were the titles of Sky News' authoritative hour-long evening news round-ups, beginning at 5pm and 6pm, British time.

== Format ==
Until October 2016, the slot was anchored by Jeremy Thompson on weekdays, providing a round-up of all the day's events and coverage of any late-breaking news. The programme ran until 6:30pm (7pm on Fridays), although the 6-7pm hour was known as Sky News at Six. The programme was branded Live at Five from the channel's launch in 1989 until April 2011, when a change in branding policy was introduced, and the majority of Sky News output was rebranded as simply Sky News. In October 2016, the programme was axed as part of a schedule change.

== Rivals ==
The programme's main rival was BBC News at Five, anchored by Huw Edwards on BBC News. Channel 5 also aired 5 News at 5 - their main news programme - at the same time.

== Presenters ==
Dates	Presenter One	Presenter Two	Weekend Presenter
March 1999 – September 2001	Jeremy Thompson	Kay Burley	Various
September 2001 - September 2002	Jeremy Thompson	Natasha Kaplinsky	Various
September 2002 – October 2005	Jeremy Thompson	Anna Botting	Various
October 2005 – October 2007	Jeremy Thompson		Various
October 2007 - July 2016	Jeremy Thompson		Andrew Wilson
July 2016 - October 2016	Jeremy Thompson		Various
