= Gillian Joseph =

British journalist

- Born: 20 July 1969 (age 57); Coventry, Warwickshire, England
- Education: City University, London
- Occupation: Newsreader
- Years active: 1991–present
- Notable credit(s): Newsroom South East; BBC London News; BBC News; Sky News

Gillian Angela Joseph (born 20 July 1969) is a British newscaster currently working for Sky News. Joseph was the anchor of weekend editions of Sky News at Ten.

== Early life ==
Joseph was born in 1969 in Coventry, England. Her parents originated from Dominica in the Caribbean. Her parents returned to Dominica, where her mother worked as a teacher, but the family later returned to England.

She attended Wembley Manor Junior School, and in 1979, the school choir was selected to sing onstage with Swedish group ABBA at Wembley Arena, singing I Have A Dream, to celebrate UNICEF's Year of the Child.

Joseph was an MA student at City University in London, studying Broadcast Journalism.

She has two daughters and a son.

== Journalism career ==
Joseph initially worked for the BBC in Manchester, as well as working as a radio reporter for BBC Radio Merseyside. She worked for Newsbeat on BBC Radio 1 in 1994.

In 1998, she moved to London and presented Newsroom South East, until it was cancelled in 2001. She then presented its replacement, BBC London News, until 2005, when she moved to Sky News.

During her time at Sky, Joseph has presented various different slots, including Sky News at Ten and Sky News in the evening alongside Jeremy Thompson.

From 2007 until October 2016, Joseph presented Sunrise alongside Mark Longhurst, and then Stephen Dixon.

From October 2016 until December 2017, Joseph hosted from 5 pm to 8 pm on Saturdays and Sundays. In December 2017 she began maternity cover for Isabel Webster. From October 2019 until summer 2021, Joseph co-anchored Sky News Breakfast at weekends on Sky News. From summer 2021 until January 2026 she presented Sky News at Ten at weekends.

== Other programmes ==
Joseph co-hosted the 2004 series called Evidence: Through My Experience with Pastor Dwight K. Nelson.

She is also a former reporter for the BBC's Holiday programme.

She also appeared on Celebrity Mastermind on the BBC in 2014, answering questions on her specialist subject "parables of the New Testament".
