= Gareth Barlow =

British journalist (born 1990)

- Born: 31 May 1990 (age 36); Reading, Berkshire, England
- Occupations: Journalist, newsreader, television and radio presenter
- Years active: 2014-present
- Website: www.garethbarlow.co.uk

Gareth Barlow is an English journalist, presenter and newsreader best known for his work with Sky News and previously with BBC News. Prior to his broadcasting career he was a farmer and butcher.

== Early life and education ==
Born in Reading, England, on 31 May 1990, he later moved with his family to North Yorkshire. He was privately educated at St Peters School, York and went to Durham University in 2008 to study zoology, though left after one year.

== Career ==
=== Farming ===
Barlow began farming at the age of seventeen when he sold his Xbox and bought six sheep. Despite not having a farming background he supplied Michelin starred restaurants and farm shops around the UK. In 2012 he was named Outstanding Newcomer to Food and Drink at the Deliciously Yorkshire Awards. In 2015 he won the Countryside Award, in recognition for his contribution to the industry.

In 2010, his story of getting into farming was highlighted by BBC One's Countryfile.

Alongside working as a farmer, Barlow trained as a butcher and slaughterman in an abattoir. In March 2013, one of Barlow's lambs went viral after he posted about it on social media. He stopped farming at the end of 2013.

=== Broadcasting ===
Barlow joined BBC Radio York in 2014, where he hosted a regular weekly radio show, Yorkshire Farming. He also contributed to BBC One's Countryfile and BBC Radio 4's Farming Today.

In 2017, he joined the BBC World Service as a broadcast journalist, on both BBC radio and TV. He was included in the 2017 Radio Academy 30-under-30 award. Alongside working on news output, he also presented various documentary radio programmes including CrowdScience and The Food Chain.

Barlow presented bulletins on the BBC News Channel. In August 2023, he came to international attention following a blooper he made while presenting a late night BBC news programme. Starting the 10pm bulletin, he said "I'm watching– I'm watching BBC News? I'm Gareth Barlow. You're watching BBC News!"

On 7 January 2024 it was announced that Barlow had joined Sky News to present the network's breakfast show, Sky News Breakfast alongside Kay Burley.

Following Burley's departure from Sky News, on 2 October 2025 the network announced that Barlow would move to anchor his own show; airing between 6am-7am and again from 10am-1pm.
