= Saima Mohsin =

British journalist (born 1977)

Saima Mohsin (born 1977) is a British journalist and presenter. She has been a Sky News presenter since 2022.

== Early life and education ==
Mohsin was born to Pakistani immigrant parents and grew up in South Norwood, London. Her father worked for Croydon Council and ran a mini-mart near Selhurst Park. After her father's death when she was young, Mohsin was raised by her mother with the help of her older siblings. Although from a Muslim background, Mohsin attended a church school. She went on to graduate with a Bachelor of Arts (BA) in Political Science from the University of Birmingham in 1998. She then pursued a postgraduate diploma in broadcast journalism in 1999.

== Career ==
In 2000, Mohsin, gained her first job in television joining ITV Meridian as a producer, and later became a presenter/reporter for the station. In 2002, Mohsin joined BBC Points West as a reporter and presenter. In 2004, she moved to BBC One's Watchdog - the UK's most watched current affairs show - as an investigative reporter on consumer issues.

Mohsin later worked freelance as a newsreader and reporter for BBC News 24, Sky News and ITN. She presented a debate show for Channel 4 on suicide bombings and the future of British Islam following the 7/7 London bombings.

In 2006, Mohsin joined GMTV on which she covered stories around the UK and the world including the plea to free Mirza Tahir Hussain from death row in Pakistan and Glaswegian runaway 12‑year-old Molly Campbell/Misba Rana.

She moved to Pakistan in 2007 to be the face of Dawn News, Pakistan's first English news channel. She presented News Eye, the channel's flagship nightly news programme. She contributes as a special correspondent for PBS NewsHour in the United States as well as ITN and Daybreak in the United Kingdom.

She was Pakistan correspondent in 2013 and later an international correspondent for CNN International until 2017.

In 2023, Mohsin sued CNN for unfair dismissal and racial discrimination after an assignment in Israel that she claimed left her with an “invisible disability". Mohsin claimed her cameraman ran over her foot in a car, causing severe tissue damage that left Mohsin struggling to sit, stand and walk or return to work full-time.
