= Mark Longhurst =

British news presenter

Mark Longhurst is a British news presenter and journalist. For 20 years, he worked at Sky News, joining in 1996 as its business correspondent and later becoming a senior presenter. He hosted various programmes on the channel including Sunrise and Sky News at Ten, until his departure in 2016. Longhurst presented ITV's regional news programme ITV News West Country from March 2017 to October 2017.

Before joining Sky News, Longhurst was a presenter and correspondent for TV-am. He also presented for Independent Television News, BBC One's South Today programme and BBC World. Between September 2022 and October 2023, Longhurst was a presenter for GB News.

== Education ==
Longhurst was educated at Reigate Grammar School, at the time a state voluntary aided grammar school in the town of Reigate in Surrey, and then Midhurst Grammar School, a state grammar school in the market town of Midhurst in West Sussex. He read Modern History for a BA (Hons) degree at Goldsmiths College, University of London. He was then indentured for the NCTJ's journalism post-graduate scheme.

== Life and career ==
Longhurst's broadcasting career spans over four decades. He covered the 1991 Gulf War as defence correspondent for TV-am. He covered the 1992 general election for ITN, did a presenting stint on BBC One's South Today and spent time at the international news channel BBC World.

In 1993, Longhurst was voted News Broadcaster of the Year in the BT Regional Press Awards.

Longhurst joined Sky News in 1996, initially as business correspondent, before moving into the studio as a presenter. He presented a range of programmes and slots for Sky, including Sky News Today, Sunrise and latterly weekend editions of Sky News at Ten. He left Sky News in August 2016, as a result of heavy cost-saving measures at Sky.

He made a documentary about Donald Campbell, made in conjunction with the Campbell family, which was aired on the History Channel in the summer of 2011 to critical acclaim.

Longhurst is currently a guest lecturer on the MA course for Broadcast Journalism at the University of Sussex. He joined ITV News West Country in March 2017, before departing in October 2017.

He joined GB News as a guest presenter in June 2022. In September 2022, Longhurst became a regular presenter of news-led content on the channel, hosting alongside Gloria De Piero initially, and Pip Tomson more recently. He also presented solo occasionally, and played a large part in the channel's coverage of the death of Queen Elizabeth II and Charles III's accession to the throne. He left the channel in October 2023.
