= Martin Stanford =

English journalist and news presenter

- Born: 2 May 1958 (age 68)
- Occupation: Journalist

Martin Stanford (born 2 May 1958) is an English journalist and former news presenter for Sky News, having worked for the channel from 1991 to 2016. He was the first British newsreader to announce the death of Diana, Princess of Wales, and presented a number of different programmes on Sky News over the years, including Sunrise, Sky News at Ten and Sky News Today. Stanford also devised and presented SkyNews.com, a programme which focused on the top stories across the Internet, between 2007 and 2010.

Until early 2016, Stanford presented Sky News on Saturday mornings from 10 am to 12 pm, including the slot #digitalview, which looked at the news from a technological standpoint. He also presented the Sky News Debate America, a weekly programme discussing American issues with two US-based pundits.

In April 2016, Stanford announced his departure from Sky News, after having worked at the channel for more than 25 years. During December 2016 Martin was covering shows over the Christmas schedules on LBC Radio. In January 2017 he was seen on TRT World, an English-language channel based in Turkey, presenting a programme called Insight. He left TRT when the Insight programme was replaced by Roundtable, presented by David Foster and Matthew Moore, and subsequently did some presenting on the BBC News channel.

Stanford joined Global Media & Entertainment as a presenter on LBC News radio when it launched in the UK on 28 October 2019. He presented the 9 am to 12 pm slot, following Lisa Aziz's breakfast show. His last show was on April 4 2025.

In an interview with Lewis Goodall for The News Agents podcast in March 2025, Stanford revealed that his son had been affected by the prescription drug Sodium Valproate, which can affect foetal development, and called on the government to pay compensation to the thousands affected by the scandal.
