= Jeremy Thompson (journalist) =

English journalist (born 1947)

- Born: 23 August 1947 (age 78)
- Occupations: Television presenter; journalist
- Years active: 1977 – 2016

Jeremy Gordon Thompson (born 23 September 1947) is an English journalist and former news presenter for Sky News, the 24-hour UK television news service operated by Sky UK. He was based at Sky News Centre in west London. He started out as a journalist on the Cambridge Evening News in 1967. In 1971 he joined the BBC as a reporter on Radio Sheffield, moving on to become a reporter on BBC Look North Leeds.

In 1977 he was appointed as the BBC's first TV North of England Correspondent. He moved to ITN as Sports Correspondent in 1982. He worked as a TV foreign correspondent from 1986 to 1998, initially based in Asia and Africa for ITN; on joining Sky News in 1993, Thompson became head of its Africa bureau, based in Johannesburg. Two years later, in Washington, D.C., he established Sky's first US bureau. From 1999 until his retirement from Sky News at the end of 2016, he presented Live at Five, Sky News's flagship news programme.

== Education ==
Thompson was educated at Sevenoaks Prep School, Sevenoaks School, and later The King's School, a boarding independent school for boys (now co-educational and non-boarding), in the city of Worcester, where presenter Chris Tarrant was a fellow pupil.

== Broadcasting career ==
Thompson was frequently Sky News's leading anchor on major stories, often presenting on location. His assignments included reporting from Rome and Vatican City on the death and funeral of Pope John Paul II in April 2005, the London bombings of July 2005, Hurricane Rita and the Asian tsunami where he was the first British presenter on the scene, reporting live from Phuket on the immediate aftermath of the disaster. He also reported from Haifa in northern Israel during the 2006 Lebanon War.

Thompson was a foreign correspondent based in Hong Kong, Johannesburg, and Washington, D.C., from where he covered many major world events. He became a studio-based presenter in 1998, but continued to present on location regularly. In September 2016, he announced his impending retirement from Sky, set to take place at the end of the year. He presented his final Sky News bulletin in the studio on 20 October 2016, and his final bulletin on location from Washington, D.C., on 10 November 2016.

His autobiography, Jeremy Thompson - Breaking News, was published in October 2017 by Biteback Books.

== Awards ==
In February 2006, Thompson won the Royal Television Society's award for Presenter of the Year.

The judges' citation noted that Thompson ...

... has a unique ability to capture the moment, to know which tiny little things really matter and – crucially – he knows when to shut up and let the pictures do the talking.

- 1992 Emmy News Awards Winner Breaking News Story – Bisho Massacre
- 1992 New York Festival Winner Best Reporter – Somali Attack and Bisho
- 1993 New York Festival Winner Best Special Report – Somalia Famine
- 1994 New York Festival Winner Best Reporter – Africa – Rwanda
- 1999 RTS TV Journalism Best News Event – Kosovo Liberation
- 2001 BAFTA News Coverage Winner – 9/11
- 2002 RTS TV Journalism Awards Winner News Event – Holly and Jessica
- 2002 BAFTA News Coverage Winner – Soham Murders
- 2004 TRIC Awards Winner – Satellite Television Personality of the Year
- 2004/2005 RTS TV Journalism Awards – Presenter of the Year
- 2005 International Emmy Breaking News – 7/7 Terror Attack
- 2009 International Emmy Outstanding News – Pakistan: Terror's Frontline
- 2009 BAFTA News Coverage Winner – Pakistan: Terror's Frontline
- 2012 RTS Journalism Awards Winner: Home News Event – UK Riots
- 2012 RTS International News Event – Libya
- 2015 BAFTA News Coverage Winner – Ebola
- 2016 RTS TV Journalism Winner – Sky News at 5 – Programme of the Year
- RTS News Channel of the Year – 2001, 2002, 2003, 2004, 2006, 2007, 2009, 2011, 2015

== Filmography ==
Thompson also appeared as himself in the following movies:

- Volcano (1997)
- Shaun of the Dead (2004)
- The Bourne Ultimatum (2007)
- The Bourne Legacy (2012)
- St Trinian's (2007)
- Incendiary (2008)
- Pixels (2015)
