= Anna Jones (journalist) =

British news presenter (born 1966)

- Born: Anna Jones; 17 April 1966 (age 60)
- Occupations: Journalist, newsreader
- Notable credit(s): BBC News Channel; Sky News

Anna Jones (born 17 April 1966) is an English journalist and news presenter who currently presents for Sky News from 8pm to midnight each Friday-Sunday.

In 2015, Jones appeared in Sky One/NBC's You, Me and the Apocalypse as a news anchor.

In 2022 Anna Jones appeared briefly in the movie: All the Old Knives, as herself, a cameo role, as a TV news anchor.

== Journalism career ==
After four years as the editor of China Economic Review, Jones joined the BBC in 1992. She spent three years as a senior producer in the BBC's business department, both producing and presenting the Business Breakfast programme from 06:00–07:00. Jones then moved to BBC World as an anchor. In 1997 she joined BBC News 24 at its launch as a business presenter, before becoming a news presenter in 1999. She anchored News 24's 09:00–13:00 strand and presented with Philip Hayton.She was on air as Allied forces began the bombing of Afghanistan, at the announcement of the death of the Queen Mother and the death of Princess Margaret, whilst also anchoring coverage of the aftermath of the 2004 tsunami.

She moved to Sky News in 2005 after 12 years at the BBC. She was on air for the announcement of London bid for the 2012 Summer Olympics.

From June 2012 she presented the 21:00 to midnight strand from Monday to Thursday, covering for Anna Botting who was on maternity leave. For 2016 to 2021, Jones was the main weekend evening anchor for Sky News, hosting Friday 21:00 to midnight and from 20:00 to midnight on Saturday and Sunday, including Sky News at Ten.

From 7 April 2021, Jones began hosting The Daily Climate Show on Sky News, the show tackles environmental issues harming our planet.
