= Sky News Today =

Lunchtime news programme, broadcast weekdays on Sky News

- Created by: Sky News
- Presented by: Gareth Barlow (Monday-Thursday 10am-1pm); Jayne Secker (Monday-Thursday 1pm-5pm); Samantha Washington (Friday-Saturday 10am-2pm); Matt Barbet (Friday 2pm-5pm, Sunday 10am-2pm); TBC (Saturday-Sunday 2pm-5pm)
- Opening theme: Sky News theme
- Country of origin: United Kingdom

Production
- Production location: Studio 21, Sky Central; Osterley, London
- Camera setup: Multi-camera
- Running time: 9/2020: 2 hours 9/2002-10/2005 & 9/2016-10/2016 & 10/2018-08/2020: 2.5 hours 10/2005-10/2007: 6 hours (2 separate editions); 10/2007-2/2009 & 10/2016-10/2018: 4 hours

Original release
- Network: Sky News
- Release: September 2002 – present

Sky News Today is a live news programme on Sky News which usually runs between 10:00 am and 5:00 pm on weekdays. The programme was presented by two anchors, however following on from the social distancing measures due to COVID-19, and the departure of Colin Brazier from Sky News, the programme is now solo anchored. Jayne Secker is the main presenter of the programme from Monday to Thursday with Samantha Washington usually presenting the Friday edition.

== Overview ==
Sky News Today was launched in September 2002, presented by Martin Stanford and Julie Etchingham, broadcast on weekdays between 10:00 am and 1:00 pm. In contrast to the rest of Sky News' coverage at that time, Sky News Today was largely presented from the heart of the newsroom, with frequent use being made of a large videowall at the back of the newsroom.

When Sky News underwent a major relaunch in October 2005, Sky News Today relaunched with it; it was brought forward an hour, now running from 9 am to 12 pm, and an afternoon edition was introduced, from 2 pm until 5 pm. The programme was now also presented by three presenters at a time: the morning edition by Martin Stanford, Anna Botting and former BBC News presenter Anna Jones, and the afternoon edition by Mark Longhurst, Stephen Dixon and new signing Ginny Buckley. The three-presenter format was axed in early 2006, with the strand returning to a more traditional two-presenter format.

In October 2007, Sky made the move to single headed presentation with Julie Etchingham becoming the anchor of Sky News Today between 9 am and 1 pm on weekdays; news summaries were presented by Colin Brazier.

From Tuesday 8 January 2008, former BBC Breakfast anchor Dermot Murnaghan replaced Julie Etchingham as main presenter of the show. Etchingham moved to ITV News to present the relaunched News at Ten with Sir Trevor McDonald. Likewise Emma Crosby took over the news summaries from Colin Brazier who moved to Afternoon Live to work alongside Kay Burley. However, shortly after taking up the headline post, Crosby moved to Sky's business news department, and then onto GMTV.

In February 2009, Sky News Today was reduced by one hour, broadcasting from 10 am to 1 pm (once again since October 2005), with The Live Desk running from 9 am to 10 am.

From January 2011, the strand started airing on Saturdays, and no longer featured a news summary presenter. Dermot now presented Monday to Wednesday with Colin Brazier presenting from Thursday - Saturday.

In September 2014, as part of a schedule revamp at Sky News, double-headed presentation was reinstated; a new strand running from 9 am to 12 pm weekdays was launched, presented by Colin Brazier and Jayne Secker. Dermot Murnaghan now presents a lunchtime slot from Monday to Wednesday.

From 26 September 2016, the slot moved to start at 11 am, as part of a new schedule; from 24 October, it was extended to 4 hours, finishing at 3 pm.

During the summer of 2017, the programme had a different format. Seeing as All Out Politics was on a summer break, one presenter presented from 10 to 12, it was double headed from 12–1, and then the presenter who started at noon took over from 1–3.

From April 2019, on Mondays to Thursdays the programme runs from 11 am until 1:30 pm, with Ian King Live following from 1:30 pm until 2 pm. On Fridays, the programme runs from 11 am until 2 pm as there is no Ian King Live.

In September 2020, the timings changed once more with the show airing from 12:00 pm until 2:00 pm. On Wednesdays however the show typically airs from 1:00 pm to 2:00 pm allowing an extended All Out Politics to cover Prime Minister's Questions. On occasion, the show airs an hour earlier from 11 am if All Out Politics isn't on air, such as during parliamentary recess.

In February 2021, it was announced that Colin Brazier was to leave Sky News Today to join GB News, a new television news channel due to launch in the UK.

Following Adam Boulton’s departure from Sky News, as of January 2022, Sky News Today now airs from 11 am each day and runs for 3 hours. During some holiday periods, the programme airs from 10 am - replacing Ian King Live - and aiding for four hours.

On 3 July 2023, Sky News overhauled its weekday daytime line-up. Consequently, Sky News Today was expanded to broadcast from 10am until 4.30pm, apart from between 11.30 and 12noon when Business Live (formerly Ian King Live) is aired.

== Presenters ==
=== Current presenters ===
Presenter	Role
Gareth Barlow	Monday - Thursday Presenter; 10:00 - 13:00
Jayne Secker	Monday - Thursday Presenter; 13:00 - 17:00
Samantha Washington	Friday Presenter - Saturday Presenter; 10:00 - 14:00
Matt Barbet	Friday Presenter - Saturday Presenter; 14:00 - 17:00; Sunday Presenter; 10:00 - 17:00

=== Presenter history ===
Morning edition

Dates	Presenter one	Presenter two	Presenter three	News summaries
September 2002 – October 2005	Martin Stanford	Julie Etchingham		
October 2005 – March 2006	Martin Stanford	Anna Botting	Anna Jones	
March 2006 – July 2006	Martin Stanford	Anna Jones		
July 2006 – September 2006	Chris Roberts	Anna Jones		
September 2006 – February 2007	Colin Brazier	Anna Jones		
February 2007 – September 2007	Martin Stanford	Anna Jones		
October 2007 – January 2008	Julie Etchingham			Colin Brazier
January 2008 – December 2010	Dermot Murnaghan			Various
January 2011 – August 2014	Dermot Murnaghan (Mon-Wed); Colin Brazier (Thu-Sat)			
September 2014 – September 2016	Colin Brazier	Jayne Secker		
May 2023 - Current	Wilfred Frost; 10:00 - 11:30 (Mon-Thu) Samantha Washington 10:00 - 13:00 (Fri), 10:00 - 14:00 (Sat), Matt Barbet 10:00 - 14:00 (Sun)			

Afternoon edition

Dates	Presenter one	Presenter two	Presenter three
October 2005 – May 2006	Mark Longhurst	Steve Dixon	Ginny Buckley
May 2006 – June 2006	Mark Longhurst	Ginny Buckley	
June 2006 – September 2006	Mark Longhurst	Julie Etchingham	
September 2006 – September 2007	Colin Brazier	Julie Etchingham	
September 2016 – February 2021	Jayne Secker (Monday-Thursday); Samantha Washington (Friday)	Colin Brazier (Monday-Thursday); Isabel Webster (Friday)	
February 2021 – September 2023	Jayne Secker (Monday-Thursday); Samantha Washington (Friday)		
September 2023	Jayne Secker (Monday-Thursday); Samantha Washington (Friday); 12:00 - 14:00	Kamali Melbourne (Monday-Friday); Matt Barbet (Friday); 14:00 - 16:30	

Preceded by Ian King Live	Sky News weekday schedule 11:00–14:00	Succeeded by The Sarah-Jane Mee Show
