= Jayne Secker =

British news presenter (born 1972)

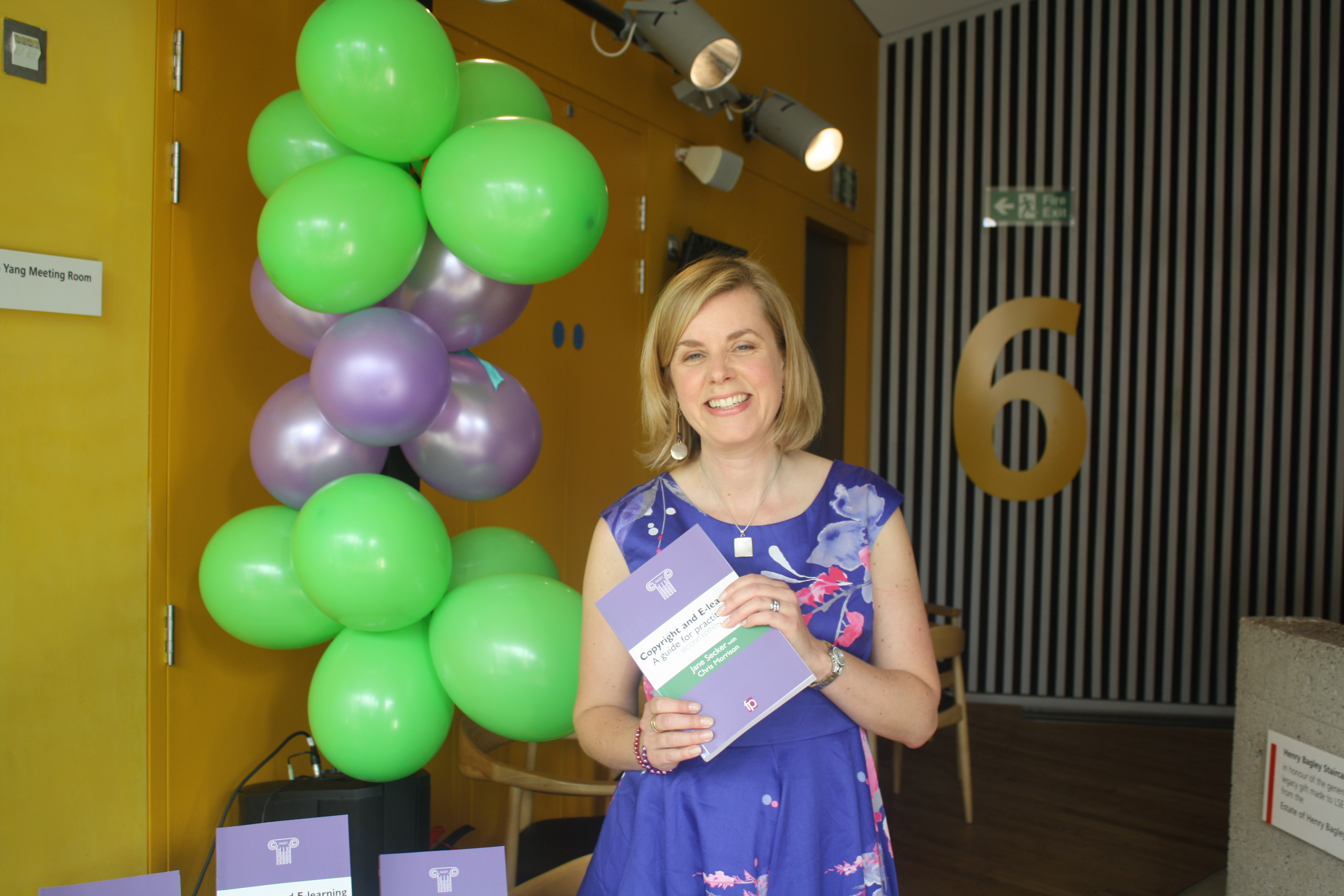
- Secker in 2016
- Born: Katherine Jayne Secker; 12 July 1972 (age 54); Bedlington, Northumberland, England
- Education: University of Stirling
- Occupations: Journalist; newsreader
- Employer: Sky News
- Notable work: Sky News Today
- Mother: Kathy Secker

Katherine Jayne Secker (born 12 July 1972) is an English journalist and newsreader for Sky News. She has presented Sky News Today on the channel since September 2014, formerly alongside Colin Brazier.

== Early life ==
Secker was born in 1972 in Bedlington, Northumberland, and grew up in North East England. Her mother was the Tyne Tees Television and BBC Radio Newcastle broadcaster Kathy Secker .

Following A levels at Westfield School, she undertook a degree course in film and media at the University of Stirling. During that time she edited student newspapers and completed an internship with BBC Radio Newcastle. After graduating, she became an assigned BBC trainee in 1996.

== Career ==
Secker joined Sky News in 2002. She spent 10 years as a foreign correspondent, frequently reporting from war zones, including the Middle East.

In 2014, as part of a schedule change, Sky News Today was launched, presented by Secker and Colin Brazier.

She conducted the first live TV interview with the astronaut Tim Peake from the International Space Station.

In April 2019, Secker drew criticism for her comments during an interview about 'no-fault evictions'. Some viewers accused her of being "patronising" and "insensitive" in her interview with the housing campaigner Kirsty Archer. The interview was halted after Archer swore during her response. Secker later apologised for what she described as the wrong tone in her interview.

In January 2024, Secker garnered online attention and criticism for her remarks in response to a Sky News report about 13-year-old Willis Gibson's achievement of reaching the "kill screen" in the game NES Tetris. In an apparently spontaneous comment, Secker stated, "As a mother, I would just say step away from the screen, go outside, get some fresh air. Beating Tetris is not a life goal."

== Personal life ==
Her mother, television and radio presenter Kathy Secker, died in 2015 aged 70. Secker also founded the charity Grace House North East, of which Jayne is a patron. She later became the mother of Sebastian
