= Barbara Serra =

Italian journalist

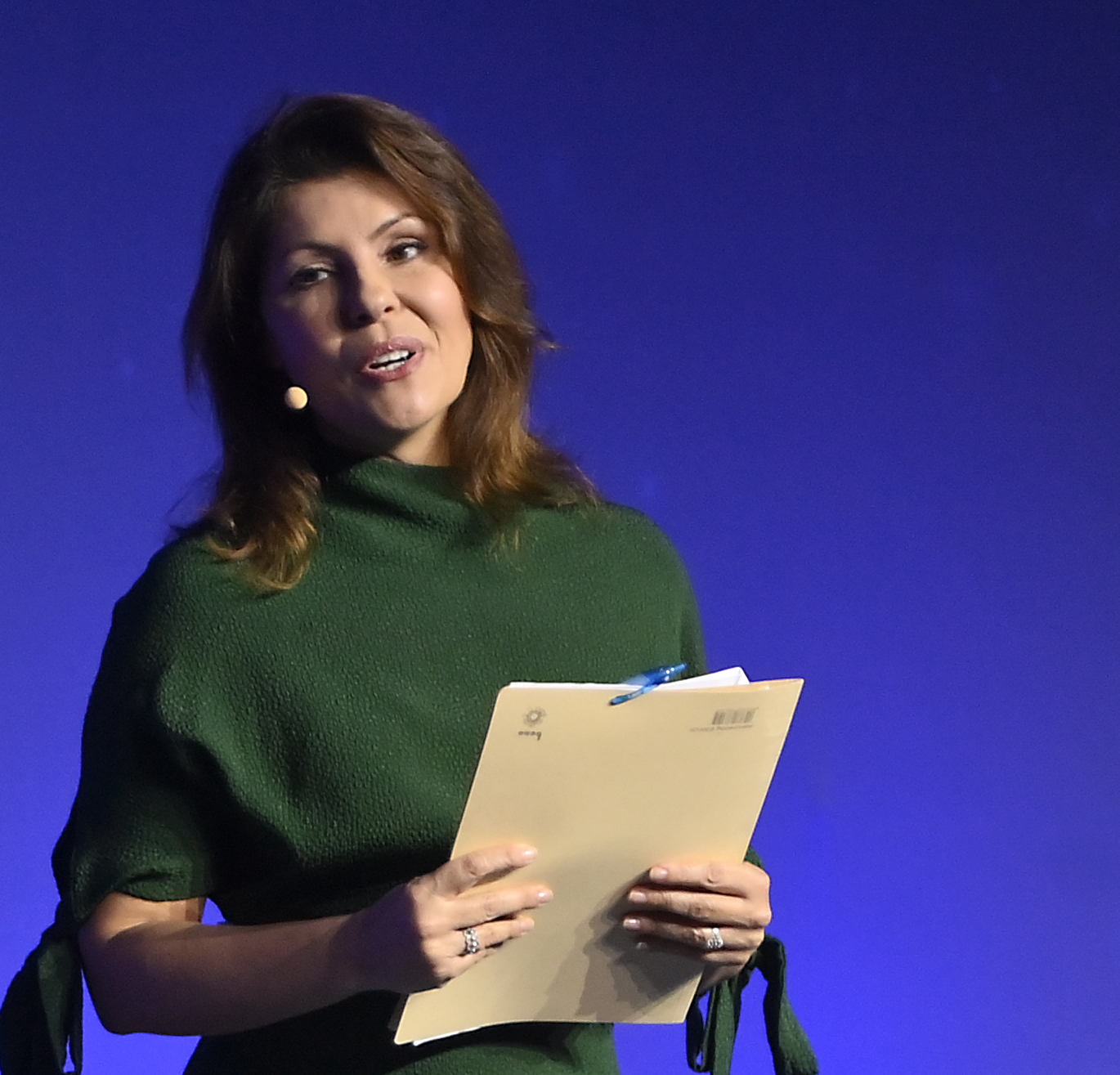
- Serra in 2022
- Born: Barbara G Serra; 1974 (age 51–52); Milan, Italy
- Education: London School of Economics; City, University of London
- Occupations: Journalist, news presenter
- Notable credit(s): BBC Radio 4, Sky News, Five News, Al Jazeera English, RAI

Barbara Serra (Italian pronunciation: [ˈbarbara ˈsɛrra]; born 1974) is an Italian-born British-based broadcast journalist and TV newsreader. She studied at the London School of Economics, before becoming a journalist.

Serra has worked for the BBC and for Five News. Since 2006 she has been a presenter and correspondent at Al Jazeera English, and from 2007 she also worked as a presenter and commentator with the Italian TV network RAI. She has been made a Knight of the Order of the Star of Italy by the Italian President, and been recognised as one of the 20 most high-profile Italian women internationally by Elle magazine.

In 2014, Serra wrote a book titled Gli Italiani Non Sono Pigri (Italians Are Not Lazy).

In 2020, Serra made the film Fascism in the Family.

She joined Sky News in October 2023.

== Early life ==
Serra was born in Milan in 1974, with her father native to Sardinia, and her mother from Sicily. From the age of nine, she was raised in Copenhagen in Denmark. As a result of this upbringing she is multi-lingual, speaking fluent Italian, English, Danish and French. Serra is the granddaughter of Vitale Piga, who served as the fascist mayor of Carbonia, Sardinia, from 28 September 1939 to 24 April 1942.

In 1993, she moved to the UK to study International Relations at the London School of Economics. She then undertook a Postgraduate Diploma in Broadcast Journalism at City University, London, to train as a journalist.

== Career ==
Serra's journalistic career started at the BBC as a researcher. She spent three years working as a producer/presenter for BBC London News, and was a producer on BBC Radio 4's Today programme. She regularly presented EuroNews on BBC Radio 5 Live. Her most challenging on-air moment was having to improvise a five-minute radio bulletin without any scripts due to a technical mishap.

In 2003, she joined Sky News as a reporter, working on both domestic and international assignments. Serra covered a wide range of stories, from the death of Pope John Paul II in Rome, to the Michael Jackson trial in California.

Serra became part of the Five News team in 2005, following a deal between Sky News and Five to deliver Five's news programming. She became the first news presenter in the United Kingdom to present a prime-time news programme in her second language on terrestrial television, her first language being Italian.

In 2006, a newly formed news network was launched which was part of the Al Jazeera network. Serra subsequently joined Al Jazeera English in April 2006 as part of its launch-team. The role and many of the other news correspondents for the network were based in London.

As part of the Al Jazeera English team, she was a correspondent in a number of European countries and also the West Bank and Gaza between 2006 and 2009. Since September 2007, she has co-presented a weekly programme called TV Talk, broadcast on Italian state TV RAI from the Al Jazeera studios in London. The TV programme broadcasts on RAI 3, with Serra regularly speaking out about the lack of female representation on Italian television.

Her work with Al Jazeera English included the breaking news report that Palestinian farmers were being attacked by Israelis in the West Bank in 2009. Also in 2009, she shadowed Pope Benedict XVI on his trip around the Middle East. This included meeting the Pope during his controversial trip to the Holy Land. Her reports were logged on the Al Jazeera website, covering each day of the Pope's trip.

In 2013, Serra interviewed Anders Fogh Rasmussen where he discussed NATO's involvement in Afghanistan and also the success of its operations in the region.

Serra presented a TEDx talk in the city of Matera, Italy, in 2014. The talk discussed the understanding of meritocracy within Italy, when compared to other aspects such as competition and ambition.

Having started as a London-based European reporter, she worked primarily as a London anchor on the flagship programme Newshour for Al Jazeera. Serra reported and anchored on location for big stories for the news and was live on air in 2013 as the conclave in Rome elected Pope Francis. She was also a stand-in presenter of The Listening Post. She has presented several programmes and documentaries, including People & Power and Streetfood Palermo on the same network. She also still works as a regular commentator for RAI.

In March 2017 she presented the prestigious Royal Television Society Journalism awards, which took place in Mayfair, London.

In 2020, Al Jazeera aired Serra's documentary, Fascism in the Family. In the documentary, Serra looks at the story of her grandfather who was mayor of Carbonia, a city built by the Benito Mussolini regime to service the local coal mines, to see what link there is between Italy's fascist past and its present. The documentary also looks at the rhetoric of Matteo Salvini and has a testimony from Holocaust survivor Senator Liliana Segre.

As of 2023 she is a Sky News freelancer presenter.

== Author ==
As an author Serra has published the book, Gli Italiani Non Sono Pigri (Italians Are Not Lazy) to oppose the main typical stereotype about 'Those Lazy Europeans'. The book was published in Italian only. It was released in 2014. When asked by ITALY Magazine about her book, she stated that she wanted to study European stereotypes and the real reason why many of those stereotypes exist. The book covered the stereotypical view by some that Southern European countries are lazy. Serra comments in the book that certain societies in Europe are simply less efficient than others and studies the causes of this.

Serra was also a regular writer and commentator for the Huffington Post.

== Recognition ==
In March 2014, Serra was recognised by winning the Comete award for her book released in the same year. Serra also won the third edition of the Caccuri Literary Prize with the book, Gli Italiani Non Sono Pigri.

She was recognised by Elle Italia as one of the 20 most high-profile Italian women internationally, along with Monica Bellucci and Miuccia Prada.

In November 2015, Serra became only the second woman to receive the prestigious 12 Apostles award, after Nobel Laureate Rita Levi-Montalcini was awarded it in 1991. The award was presented for Serra's work as a writer and journalist.

In 2019 Serra received the Knighthood of the Order of the Star of Italy. She received the knighthood for raising awareness of the conditions of minorities through her journalism work.
