= Jonathan Samuels =

British broadcast journalist

Jonathan Samuels (born 1972) is a British broadcaster and journalist. He co-anchored Sky News Sunrise between 2016 and 2018 and now anchors The News Hour on Friday, Saturday and Sunday as well as News at Ten during weekend periods. He can also be seen elsewhere across the schedule. Previously he held a range of senior correspondent posts for Sky News, the 24-hour television news service, including being based in Sydney from 2011 to 2014.

Previously, Samuels was Chief Correspondent on Five News. He also presented and reported for BBC Look East and BBC Spotlight and began his broadcasting career as a BBC trainee at BBC Radio Cornwall.

== Early life ==
He is the son of Canon Chris Samuels, formerly of St Mary's Church, Handbridge, of Overleigh Road in Handbridge, who was ordained in 1967, previously the vicar of St Helen's Church, Tarporley until March 1983, and chairman of the governors of Tarporley school. His father retired in October 2005. His sister studied at Birmingham School of Acting.

Samuels was educated at The King's School, in Chester, Cheshire, and later studied at Loughborough University and then Cardiff University, where he obtained his postgraduate diploma in broadcast journalism.

== Life and career ==
A journalist for more than 20 years, Samuels has covered domestic and international stories. Samuels covered the missing miners in Chile, conflicts in the Middle East, protests in Hong Kong and Bangkok, tsunamis in Japan and Indonesia, bushfires in Australia, floods in Pakistan and Europe, terror attacks and royal tours.

For a number of months he was based in LA covering the Michael Jackson trial and also spent weeks following the search for missing plane MH370.

He anchored live coverage of the G7 summit, COP26, the fall of Kabul, the rise and fall of Boris Johnson, the Russian invasion of Ukraine, Platinum jubilee and deaths of Prince Philip and Queen Elizabeth.

When not working Jonathan is a traveler, enthusiast and author.

He lives in West London with his wife Laura Bundock, Sky's Royal Correspondent and two children.
