= Colin Brazier =

English journalist and news presenter (born 1968)

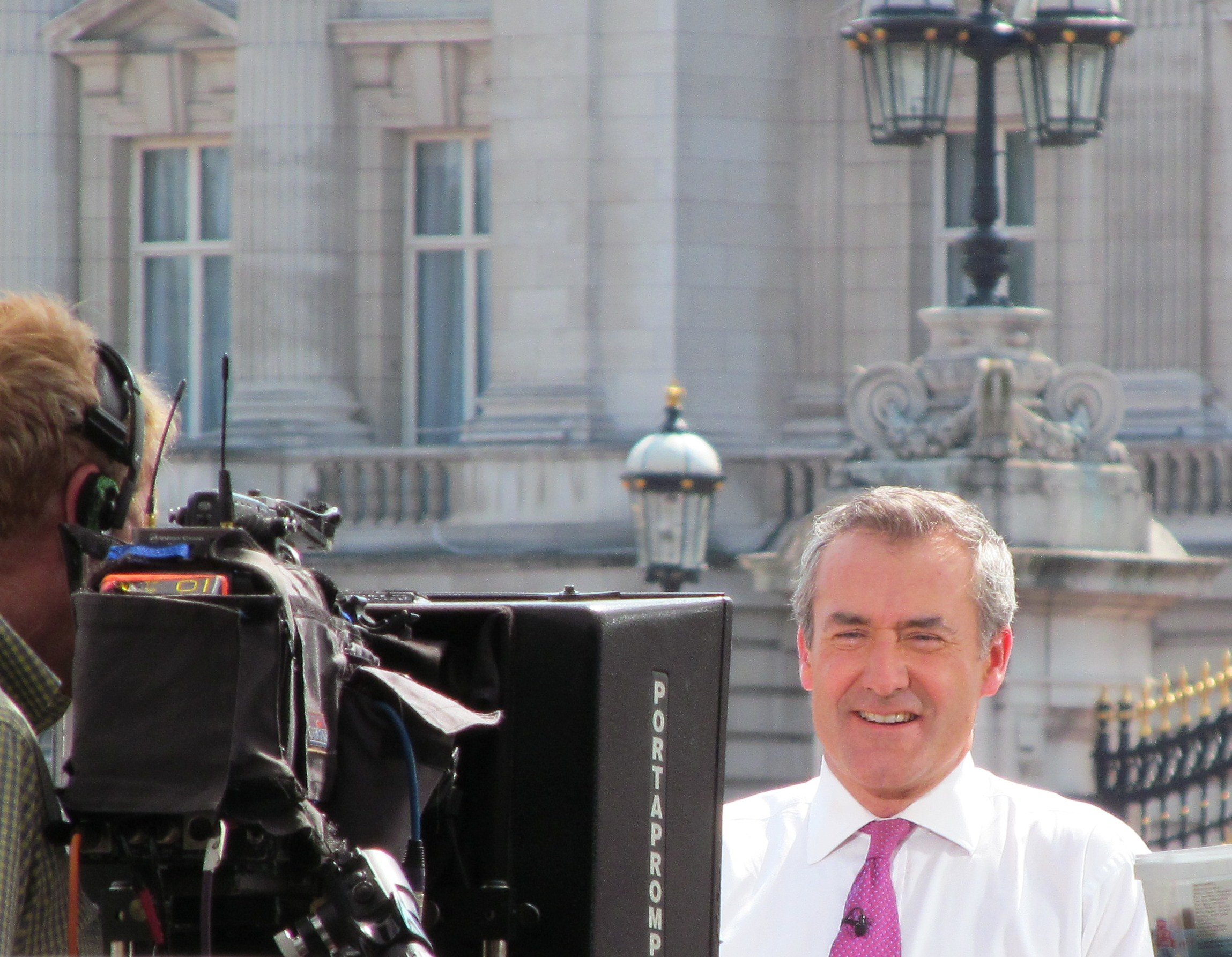
- Brazier in 2013
- Born: Colin Eschelly; 28 March 1968 (age 58); Bradford, West Yorkshire, England
- Education: Cardiff University (BA)
- Occupations: Television presenter, news presenter
- Notable credit(s): Sky News; GB News
- Spouse: Joanna Roughton (m. 1999; died 2018) Olivia Warham (m. 2024)
- Children: 6

Colin Brazier (born 28 March 1968) is an English television and radio journalist.

He worked for Sky News between 1997 and 2021. Between 2005 and 2011, Brazier presented Saturday Live on the channel. He presented Sky News Today on the channel alongside Jayne Secker from September 2014, alongside other programmes on the channel.

He worked for GB News between 2021 and until September 2022, presenting the Brazier show.

In 2023 he joined LBC.

As of 2026, he presents the Brazier Show on Outpost Media.

== Early life ==
Born in Bradford, Brazier was brought up by his mother, a nurse. In 1985, he was present at the Bradford City stadium fire.

Brazier was born Colin Eschelly, but later changed his surname after becoming estranged from his father. He studied English literature at Cardiff University, where he was also elected to serve for a year as Communications Officer at Cardiff University Students' Union. He was editor of the Gair Rhydd student newspaper. He then trained as a journalist at The Northern Echo and the Yorkshire Post, and briefly worked at The Observer.

== Broadcasting career ==
Brazier joined Sky News in 1997, where he covered politics, the Royal Family and had several foreign postings, in addition to anchoring studio coverage. He was the first British journalist to enter Iraq with coalition troops during the 2003 invasion, Brazier's documentary, Brothers in Baghdad, was later shortlisted at the 48th Monte-Carlo Television Festival.

In December 2004, Brazier was alleged to have assaulted his producer, Julian Morrison, after an argument following a staff Christmas party in Brussels. Morrison went to hospital, having suffered a broken nose and damaged teeth, and was off work for several days. Brazier was recalled to London following the incident.

Brazier was the first journalist to enter southern Lebanon with Israeli forces in 2006. In 2009 he conducted one of the final interviews given by the Muammar Gaddafi. Brazier wrote an article for the New Statesman discussing his experiences of meeting Gaddafi at his compound in Libya.

In 2012 Brazier posted on his blog that the UK Government could save "gazillions" by transporting 120,000 British "problem families" to the South Sandwich Islands in the South Atlantic.

In 2014 Brazier was Sky's sole nominee in the Royal Television Society Awards Presenter of the Year category for his work in Nairobi during the Westgate shopping mall attack.

In July 2014, following the destruction of Malaysia Airlines Flight 17 over Ukraine, Brazier was filmed tampering with the contents of a victim's luggage. Widespread media criticism and calls for Brazier's resignation ensued. Over 100 complaints about Brazier's conduct were submitted to Ofcom. In an article published in The Guardian on 22 July 2014, Brazier apologised and said that his actions were "a serious error of judgment".

In 2015 Brazier reported on events including the Tunisian terror attacks and the Nepal earthquake.

In 2016 Brazier won an International Emmy Award and was nominated for a BAFTA for his coverage of the European migrant crisis.

In February 2021, it was announced that Brazier was leaving Sky News for GB News. On the channel he and Mercy Muroki co-hosted Brazier & Muroki, a daytime "news, interview and debate" programme. In August 2021 it was replaced by a different programme, leaving Brazier's sole presenting role as filling in for Andrew Neil in the 8 pm slot. Following Neil's resignation as a GB News presenter in September 2021, Brazier was given a permanent programme at 8 pm called Brazier. In January 2022, Brazier's 8pm weeknight show was moved to 4-6pm, and the 8pm Monday-Friday slot was filled by a new show, Steyn, hosted by Mark Steyn. His weekly TV show Brazier was also aired via radio on GB News Radio. In September 2022, he was sacked by GB News, during a re-shuffle..

Brazier joined LBC in April 2023 to host late nights Monday to Thursday 10pm-1am, having worked as a cover presenter some weeks prior. Brazier's last show on LBC was on 31 August 2023, when he decided to retire from journalism to study farming, "a 'dream' he has long held", at the Royal Agricultural University.

In May 2026 Brazier came out of retirement to present the Brazier show on Outpost Studios, an online content outlet founded by filmmakers Alex Webster and former Brexit Party MEP James Glancy.

== Personal life ==
In 1999, Brazier married Joanna Roughton, at the time Reuters Asia editor and then Sky's head of foreign news until 2002, with whom he had six children. In 2017, Brazier and his family were featured on Sky News talking about Sky's Ocean Rescue campaign. Roughton died from breast cancer in July 2018, aged 55.

Brazier is a practising Catholic, and has written articles for the Catholic Herald. He has stated that he is "ill at ease" with modern funeral traditions.

A keen cricketer, Brazier is a member of the Lord's Taverners, a charity which aims to improve the fortunes of underprivileged young cricketers, and has played in fundraising matches for the organisation. He was once seen on-camera during a Sky News broadcast appearing to practise a cover drive.

Brazier's 2013 book Sticking Up For Siblings was based on his experiences as a father of six young children.

Brazier married Olivia Warham at Our Lady of Victories Catholic Church in Kensington, London, on 20 June 2024.
