= 2016 in British television =

This is a list of events that took place in 2016 related to Television in the United Kingdom.

== Events ==
=== January ===
| Date | Event |
|---|---|
| 1 | BBC One airs an extended version of its television special, Adele at the BBC, which includes comedy footage of a sketch in which Adele surprises a roomful of lookalikes. The footage had proved popular with viewers of the BBC's YouTube site, following the programme's previous broadcast in November 2015. |
| 1 | ITV have signed a £30m four-year deal for the terrestrial broadcasting rights to air horse racing from 2017, ending a three decades long run of the sport on Channel 4. Major events will include the Grand National. |
| 2 | It is announced that British horse racing coverage will move from Channel 4 to ITV from January 2017 after ITV won the broadcasting rights to show free-to-air coverage of the sport the previous day. Events such as the Cheltenham Festival, Grand National, the Derby and Royal Ascot will be part of ITV's coverage, with fixtures airing on ITV and ITV4. |
| 2 | Figures indicate that The Abominable Bride, an episode of BBC One's Sherlock that aired on New Year's Day, was the most watched drama over the 2015–16 festive period, with an audience of eight million viewers. The Christmas Day finale of Downton Abbey had the highest viewership of that day, with an audience of 6.6 million. Consolidated figures, which include catch-up viewers, subsequently indicate Downton Abbey to have been the most watched programme of the festive period, with an audience of 10.5 million. |
| 3 | Debut of BBC One's adaptation of War & Peace, which is watched by an average audience of 6.3 million, peaking at 6.7 million. |
| 4 | The BBC confirms 16 February as the date on which BBC Three will begin its transition to an online only channel. A new logo for the channel is introduced. |
| 5 | Launch of the seventeenth series of Celebrity Big Brother. Contestant Winston McKenzie causes controversy after expressing anti-gay sentiment in his entry video when he says that he will "cope with a homosexual in the house [by] standing against a brick wall all the time". The former UK Independence Party member and candidate for the 2016 London Mayoral election is booed by the audience as he enters the Big Brother house, while Ofcom have received 165 complaints about the comments by the following day. The regulator says it will assess the complaints before deciding whether to launch an investigation. |
| 6 | Writer Charlie Higson confirms that ITV have cancelled Jekyll and Hyde after one series. |
| 6 | The Guardian newspaper appoints Newsnight's investigations correspondent, Nick Hopkins as its head of investigations. |
| 6 | The opening episode of the Eighteenth series of Midsomer Murders is unique in that its storyline features no actual murder. |
| 6 | UKTV announces that Dave will show its first live sporting event – a boxing match between David Haye and Mark de Mori at the O2 Arena on 16 January. Later in the year Dave broadcasts the 2016 BDO World Trophy darts tournament and cricket's Caribbean Premier League. |
| 7 | Police confirm that three bodies found at a house in London two days earlier are those of missing former EastEnders actress Sian Blake and her two children, who disappeared on 13 December 2015. Her partner, Arthur Simpson-Kent, is subsequently arrested by police in Ghana. |
| 8 | The BBC is forced to defend its decision to allow shadow defence minister Stephen Doughty to resign on an edition of The Daily Politics after the Labour Party's leadership accuses it of pursuing a "particular political narrative". Doughty had resigned on the programme two days earlier, citing his unhappiness over a recent shadow cabinet reshuffle. |
| 8 | Sheridan Smith will play the head of a Dewsbury residents group who spearheaded the search for Shannon Matthews in a forthcoming BBC drama about the girl's 2008 kidnapping. |
| 8 | Archaeologists have called for Channel 5 to pull the series Battlefield Recovery from the schedule amid allegations of grave robbery. The programme, due to debut on 9 January, shows amateur enthusiasts unearthing war graves in Eastern Europe, and is believed to be a reworking of a 2014 programme titled Nazi War Diggers, which was pulled from the National Geographic schedules after criticism. |
| 11 | Channel 4 have signed David Coulthard to present their Formula One coverage, ending speculation that he would appear in the new series of Top Gear. |
| 14 | Britain's Next Top Model (also known as Britain & Ireland's Next Top Model) returns after a three-year hiatus, airing on Lifetime. |
| 15 | As Barbara Windsor makes her latest occasional return to EastEnders as Peggy Mitchell, the actress reveals that she has decided to quit the series for good and that her character will be killed off. Peggy will die from terminal cancer in scenes to be aired later in the year. It is subsequently announced that Ross Kemp will reprise his role as Peggy's son, Grant as part of her exit storyline. |
| 15 | UKTV signs a deal with the BBC to provide a same-day repeat of EastEnders. The deal will also see the return of the weekend omnibus edition. |
| 18 | Peter Fincham announces he will step down as ITV's director of television from February. He will be replaced by Kevin Lygo, the channel's current director of studios. |
| 19 | BBC One controller Charlotte Moore is appointed to the newly created role of controller of BBC TV channels and iPlayer, while Kim Shillinglaw, current controller of BBC Two and BBC Four is to leave the BBC and her position abolished. |
| 22 | Steven Moffat announces that will be quitting as head writer and executive producer of Doctor Who after the tenth series and a Christmas special in 2017, after which he would be replaced in the role by Broadchurch creator and writer Chris Chibnall in 2018. |
| 31 | The death is announced of broadcaster Sir Terry Wogan following a short illness. He was 78. |

=== February ===
| Date | Event |
|---|---|
| 2 | The BBC announces a deal with Discovery Communications that enables it to broadcast coverage of the Summer and Winter Olympics up to and including the 2024 Summer Games. The agreement covers television, radio and online coverage. |
| 4 | Former Friends star Matt LeBlanc has been signed as a presenter on the relaunched Top Gear, hosting alongside Chris Evans when the show returns in May. |
| 5 | Media regulator Ofcom is considering whether to investigate a party political broadcast by the UK Independence Party that urged people to vote to leave the European Union because Turkey could join. The film, which emphasised Turkey's Muslim population, suggested that country's accession to the EU could result in an influx of Turkish citizens into the UK. The four-minute film, which aired on 3 February, has resulted in 30 complaints, including allegations of inciting racial hatred. |
| 5 | It is reported that actress Tina Hobley has been forced to quit the third series of Channel 4's athletics-based reality show The Jump after sustaining a dislocated elbow that resulted from a fall while she was training for the series. |
| 5 | Reality television star Scott Timlin wins the seventeenth series of Celebrity Big Brother. |
| 8 | Channel 4 launches an urgent safety review of its athletics-based reality series The Jump after olympic gymnast Beth Tweddle and swimmer Rebecca Adlington became the second and third contestants to be forced to withdraw from the competition as a result of injuries suffered during its making. |
| 9 | Reality television star Mark-Francis Vandelli withdraws from The Jump after fracturing his ankle during training. |
| 11 | The full Top Gear presenting line up is revealed: Chris Evans, Matt LeBlanc, Sabine Schmitz, Eddie Jordan, Rory Reid and Chris Harris. |
| 11 | After suffering a hamstring injury during training, athlete Linford Christie becomes the fifth contestant to withdraw from The Jump. |
| 11 | Channel 5, 5*, and 5USA get a new look as their stencil logos for their channels get their very first airing. 5* is also rebranded as 5Star on the same day. |
| 15 | BBC Worldwide announces that Keeping Up Appearances is the Corporation's most exported television programme, having been sold to broadcasters overseas nearly 1,000 times. |
| 15 | BBC Two begins airing The People v. O. J. Simpson, the first series in the American true crimes anthology, American Crime Story. |
| 15 | BBC Three's final night on air sees it repeating episodes of some of its most popular series, including The Mighty Boosh and Family Guy. The final programme, aired in the early hours of 16 February, is a repeat of an episode of Gavin & Stacey. BBC Three becomes an online channel from 16 February. |
| 15 | Watch is rebranded as W. |
| 18 | Sean O'Connor, current editor of BBC Radio 4's The Archers is to take over as producer of EastEnders, replacing Dominic Treadwell-Collins. |
| 19 | The BBC Trust criticises two nature documentaries for serious editorial breaches over misleading content. In Patagonia: Earth's Secret Paradise, aired in September 2015, apparent footage of a volcanic eruption which occurred that year was actually of a similar event filmed in 2011, while a 2011 documentary apparently showing wild wolves hunting a baby camel was also faked. Producers used a semi-domesticated wolf for scenes in Human Planet: Deserts – Life in the Furnace, which was let off its lead shortly before filming commenced. |
| 19 | Nick Grimshaw confirms he has left The X Factor, and will not be a judge on the series when it returns later in the year. |
| 19 | This Morning agony aunt Denise Robertson, who has been with the series since it began in 1988, confirms she has been diagnosed with pancreatic cancer. |
| 20 | The family of Paul Daniels confirm the magician has been diagnosed with an inoperable brain tumour. |
| 22 | Olly Murs and Caroline Flack confirmed they have left The X Factor, and will not be returning as presenters when it returns later in the year. |
| 23 | The BBC announces three special debates ahead of the European Union membership referendum on 21 June—a young voters debate from Glasgow on 19 May, a Question Time special on 15 June, and what is billed as the BBC's "biggest ever campaign event" at Wembley Arena on 21 June. |
| 23 | Chef James Martin announces he will leave BBC One's Saturday Kitchen from the end of March; the programme will use a guest presenter format from the start of April. Martin subsequently states that his decision to quit the programme after witnessing the death of a stranger who was appearing on stage. |
| 24 | Jeremy Clarkson apologises to Oisin Tymon, the Top Gear producer he punched in 2015, after settling a £100,000 race discrimination and injury claim. |
| 25 | Publication of the Dame Janet Smith Review, which concludes that serious failings at the BBC allowed Jimmy Savile and Stuart Hall to sexually abuse nearly 100 people without detection. BBC Director-General Tony Hall confirms that disc jockey Tony Blackburn has been sacked by the BBC because he failed to co-operate with an element of Janet Smith's report. Blackburn claims he has been "hung out to dry" by the investigation, and threatens to take legal action against his former employers. |
| 25 | Blue Peter presenter Lindsey Russell abandons her attempt to cross the Irish Sea in a giant inflatable ball due to bad weather. |
| 26 | Bill Turnbull presents his final BBC Breakfast programme after fifteen years as a presenter. Sports presenter Dan Walker is announced as his replacement. |
| 26 | Channel 4 News economics editor Paul Mason announces he is leaving the broadcaster to pursue a freelance career. |
| 26 | Former The Voice UK contestants Joe and Jake are selected to represent the UK at the 2016 Eurovision Song Contest, with the uptempo "You're Not Alone", a song about unity and love. They are selected to be this year's UK Eurovision entry during a live show held at the O2 Forum in Kentish Town, London, and which is broadcast on BBC Four. |
| 26 | The weekly newspaper review programme What the Papers Say, which aired on television for many years and of late has been part of the BBC Radio 4 schedule, is to be axed due to cost-cutting measures at the network. It will end in March after being broadcast for 60 years. |
| 27 | Singer Sarah Harding becomes the sixth person to withdraw from the third series of Channel 4's The Jump because of injury. |
| 29 | Heather Mills becomes the seventh person to leave The Jump because of injury, having been brought in to replace previous contestants injured during the making of the programme. |

=== March ===
| Date | Event |
|---|---|
| 1 | Peter Salmon is to step down as the BBC's Director of Studios to take up a position with Endemol Shine, it is announced. |
| 1 | Sir David Clementi's review of BBC governance has concluded that the BBC Trust is "flawed" and that Ofcom should take on responsibility for the role currently overseen by the Trust. |
| 1 | Home becomes UKTV's fifth channel to launch on Freeview. |
| 2 | The death is announced of Coronation Street creator Tony Warren, who died on the evening of 1 March, aged 79. |
| 2 | Culture Secretary John Whittingdale announces that the government will rush through legislation to close the loophole that allows viewers without a television licence to watch catch-up services on BBC iPlayer. |
| 2 | Channel 5 confirms plans to air the Home and Away spin-off An Eye for an Eye, with broadcast dates of 17 March on 5Star and 21 March on Channel 5. |
| 6 | Former Rugby Union international Ben Cohen wins Series 3 of The Jump. Cohen had been drafted in to replace one of a number of celebrities who had dropped out of the series due to injury. |
| 8 | Adrian Lester and Sophie Okonedo will star in ground breaking BBC One crime drama Undercover, which debuts in April. The show is rare in that it will feature black lead characters in a prime time drama where their ethnicity is not a central part of the plot. |
| 8 | The full presenting team of Channel 4's Formula One coverage is confirmed as Murray Walker, Eddie Jordan, Steve Jones, David Coulthard, Alain Prost, Susie Wolff, Ben Edwards and Alex Zanardi. |
| 9 | Former Newsround presenter John Craven is confirmed as the presenter of a new Countryfile daily spin off titled Countryfile Diaries, which will attempt to build on the popularity of the Sunday evening programme. |
| 10 | A YouGov survey commissioned by the political organisation 38 Degrees indicates that 53% of those questioned regard the BBC as their most-trusted source of news content. |
| 10 | A report published by TV industry marketing body Thinkbox suggests that viewers watched an average of 77 minutes per week of streamed television content from providers such as Netflix and Amazon Prime during 2015, almost doubling the average for 2014. |
| 10 | The BBC announces a landmark sitcoms season, which will see new one-off episodes of series such as Till Death Us Do Part, Porridge and Keeping Up Appearances. |
| 10 | BBC Director-General Tony Hall pledges to investigate increasing the availability of British Sign Language for entertainment programmes after being questioned on the issue by school students as part of the BBC's annual School Report News Day. |
| 11 | ITV officially axes the department-store set period drama Mr Selfridge after four series and forty episodes were made. |
| 14 | Top Gear presenter Chris Evans apologises "unreservedly" after it emerged that scenes for a stunt in the forthcoming series of the motoring show were filmed around the Cenotaph, something Evans describes as "disrespectful" and which left him feeling "mortified" when he learned of it. Evans also says that footage of the stunt would've be broadcast The BBC also confirms that the material will not be shown. |
| 14 | CBBC gets a new look and logo. |
| 14 | ITV confirms that the set of Emmerdale, which is situated on the Harewood Estate in Leeds, will be open for guided tours from April. |
| 15 | Comedian Jack Dee confirms he is stepping down as presenter of The Apprentice: You're Fired due to other work commitments. |
| 16 | As the second series of BBC One crime drama Happy Valley reaches its conclusion, screenwriter Sally Wainwright says that she would like to write a third series but needs time to develop the plot. |
| 17 | Sky News presenter Kay Burley attracts ridicule over her response to the death of former newsreader Cliff Michelmore after confusing him with Malcolm Muggeridge, who died in 1990, and tweeting her condolences to Muggeridge's family. |
| 17 | Chloe Keenan wins Cycle 10 of Britain's Next Top Model. |
| 18 | Sport Relief 2016 is aired across the BBC, raising more than £55m for good causes by the following day. |
| 19 | Channel 4 begins its Formula One coverage with highlights of the 2016 Australian Grand Prix, the first race of the 2016 season. The first live race to be aired by the channel is the Bahrain Grand Prix, held two weeks later. |
| 21 | After the concluding two episodes of the BBC One thriller The Night Manager were posted online, producers of the series say they are working hard to remove the content. |
| 21 | An edition of The Jeremy Kyle Show aired on 18 January that included an expletive spoken with a Scottish accent escapes censure from Ofcom after ITV said that the person's accent meant the word had not been "understood" before the show was broadcast. No complaints about the incident were received by the regulator. |
| 22 | Good Morning Britain presenter Susanna Reid breaks down while interviewing a man who rescued a baby from drowning. |
| 24 | Sky Sports signs an exclusive deal to broadcast live Formula 1 coverage from 2019, meaning live coverage with the exception of the British Grand Prix will no longer be free. |
| 25 | A fire in the post room of ITV's London studios temporarily forces Good Morning Britain off the air as people are evacuated from the building and the fire tackled. |
| 26 | James Martin presents his final edition of Saturday Kitchen after ten years. |
| 26 | Chloe Castro and Beth Morris, two contestants on this year's series of The Voice, withdraw from the contest hours before the live part of the show is due to begin. Castro cites health reasons for her decision, while Morris says she is withdrawing for personal reasons. Morris subsequently confirms that she withdrew from the series because of cocaine addiction. |
| 27 | The FA Cup trophy that was in use between 1911 and 1992 is valued at more than £1m on an edition of Antiques Roadshow, making it the most valuable item to appear on the programme. |
| 27 | The final episode of BBC One's thriller The Night Manager draws an audience of 6.6 million, beating ITV's Our Queen at 90, which airs in the same timeslot but has a million fewer viewers. |
| 28 | Jeremy Kyle makes his presenting debut on Good Morning Britain, standing in for Piers Morgan. |
| 29 | Dermot O'Leary confirms he is returning to present the next series of The X Factor just a year after leaving the role. |
| 31 | Amy Stanning becomes the UK's first transgender continuity announcer after being hired by Channel 4 to provide voiceover for announcements to celebrate International Transgender Day of Visibility. |

=== April ===
| Date | Event |
|---|---|
| 1 | Steve November confirms he is to step down as ITV's head of drama after sixteen years with the broadcaster. |
| 1 | Alan Heath is named as the 2016 Mastermind Champion. |
| 2 | Saturday Night Takeaway airs its final episode of the series outside of the United Kingdom live from a docked P&O Cruise Ship in Barcelona, Spain. |
| 5 | Cheryl Cole confirms she will not be part of the X Factor judging panel when the series returns later in the year. |
| 6 | ITV News presenter Mark Austin makes his presenting debut on Good Morning Britain. |
| 7 | Alex Scott wins the second series of Bear Grylls: Mission Survive. |
| 9 | Channel 4 airs its final Grand National before ITV take over the broadcasting rights in 2017. Viewing figures indicate the event to have been watched by 10m people. |
| 9 | Kevin Simm, a former member of 2000s group Liberty X, wins the fifth series of The Voice UK, and releases his debut single "All You Good Friends". |
| 12 | The Football Association confirms it has signed a new three-year contract with BT TV and the BBC to air coverage of the FA Cup, giving them the broadcasting rights to the competition until 2021. The deal will also see an increase in coverage of women's football by both broadcasters. |
| 15 | While reporting from the launch of the Vote Leave campaign in Manchester, Channel 4 journalist Michael Crick is interrupted by an audience member while doing a live broadcast after London Mayor Boris Johnson asked for someone to go and shut him up. |
| 17 | Former snooker World Champion Steve Davis announces his retirement live on air during the BBC's coverage of the 2016 World Snooker Championship. Davis, who is providing commentary on the tournament, is allowed to carry the World Championship trophy on a lap of honour around the Crucible Theatre, the venue for the competition. |
| 18 | Peterhouse, Cambridge wins the 2015–16 series of University Challenge, beating St John's College, Oxford 215–30. |
| 19 | Sky launches a new major rebrand of its channels, including Sky 1, Sky Atlantic, and Sky Arts. |
| 21 | BBC One drama series Dickensian is cancelled after one series. |
| 23 | Pearl Mackie is confirmed as the new Doctor Who companion, replacing Jenna Louise-Coleman, who left the series in 2015. The announcement is made on BBC One at half-time during the FA Cup semi-final between Manchester United and Everton. |
| 27 | The BBC confirms that Top Gear will have a sister programme, Extra Gear, presented by Rory Reid. |
| 30 | Snooker commentator John Virgo apologises after he is heard swearing during BBC One's afternoon coverage of the 2016 Snooker World Championship semi-final between Mark Selby and Marco Fu. Virgo had believed he was holding an off-air conversation at the time. |

=== May ===
| Date | Event |
|---|---|
| 1 | The Labour Party accuses Culture Secretary John Whittingdale of "unacceptable interference" after a number of Sunday newspapers report that he will allow commercial broadcasters to have a say over the BBC's peak-time scheduling. The government says it has no plans to implement such a policy. |
| 2 | The BBC have secured a two-year extension to their World Snooker Championship broadcasting rights, meaning coverage of the tournament will remain with the BBC until at least 2019. |
| 6 | Jane Devonshire wins the 2016 series of MasterChef. |
| 8 | Debut of Robert Peston's new ITV politics talk show, Peston on Sunday. Guests on the opening programme include Chancellor of the Exchequer George Osborne and documentary maker Louis Theroux. The programme, screened immediately after BBC One's The Andrew Marr Show, is seen by an audience of 166,000, a tenth of the 1.6 million viewers who watched its BBC equivalent. |
| 10 | The government has dropped plans for a full privatisation of Channel 4, and is instead considering other options, including a possible partial privatisation of the broadcaster. |
| 11 | Jeremy Clarkson confirms that his new Amazon Prime series will be titled The Grand Tour, and air from a different location each week. The show is due to begin in the autumn. |
| 11 | ITV confirms that it has axed the World War II drama series Home Fires after two seasons, prompting the launch of a Change.org petition urging the broadcaster to reconsider its decision. |
| 11 | Vote Leave, the official group campaigning for Britain to leave the European Union, warns ITV it faces "consequences for its future" after the broadcaster schedules a referendum debate between Prime Minister David Cameron and UK Independence Party leader Nigel Farage while overlooking its own prominent members. Vote Leave also threatens to take legal action against ITV over the 7 June programme. In response ITV says that Vote Leave have been invited to take part in a separate debate on 9 June. |
| 12 | Publication of the long-awaited white paper setting out the government's vision of the future direction of the BBC. Among proposals are greater transparency of entertainers salaries, to make the BBC a more distinctive service and to increase the diversity of its output. The document also proposes the appointment of an executive board to replace the BBC Trust, and the possibility for the first BBC pay-TV service. While broadly welcoming the proposals, BBC Director-General Tony Hall expresses concern the government will have too much power over the BBC if allowed to appoint board members. |
| 14 | Ukraine's Jamala wins the 2016 Eurovision Song Contest with "1944", a song about Josef Stalin's deportation of Crimean Tatars during World War II. The song narrowly beats the Australian entry, Dami Im's "Sound of Silence", while the United Kingdom's entry, "You're Not Alone" by Joe and Jake finishes in 24th place. Figures subsequently indicate the event to have been watched by an average audience of 7.1m, peaking at 8.5m. |
| 17 | The BBC announces the closure of its Food, Newsbeat and BBC News Magazine websites as part of a £15 million cost-cutting drive. Although the content will be archived, and therefore continue to be available online, it will be more difficult to access. News of the closure of the BBC Food website prompts 100,000 people to sign a Change.org petition to urge the BBC to reverse its decision. In response the BBC says that most of the 11,000 recipes affected by the changes will be moved to the BBC Good Food website, which is operated by the corporation's commercial arm. |
| 17 | Barbara Windsor makes her final EastEnders appearance as Peggy Mitchell; the character having been killed off. Windsor's final episode is watched by a viewership of 6.9 million (a 37% audience share). Pam St Clement makes a one-off return as Pat Butcher, as a hallucination, four years after the character was killed off. |
| 18 | Liverpool's UEFA Europa League match with Sevilla gives BT Sport their largest ever audience, with 3.5 million viewers. As well as being aired by BT, the match is also shown free-to-air via YouTube. |
| 20 | ITV's South Bank studios are evacuated after a bomb alert involving a suspect vehicle parked nearby. |
| 20 | Overnight viewing figures indicate that the previous day's repeat edition of Bargain Hunt–a show highlighted by the government in its recent white paper as an example of the BBC's lack of diversity and adventure–attracted a greater audience share than did that evening's episode of Peaky Blinders. Bargain Hunt, aired at 12.15 pm, had an audience of 1.7 million (a 32% share), while Peaky Blinders, at 9.00 pm, was seen by 1.5 million (8%). |
| 26 | The BBC announces plans for the Barbara Windsor biopic Babs, as well as a dramatisation of David Nicholls' novel Us. The BBC Two drama Peaky Blinders has also been renewed for another two series. The programme was re-aired in 2020 after the death of Barbra Windsor. |
| 27 | Actor Adam Woodyatt, who has played Ian Beale in BBC One's EastEnders since the series began in 1985 reaches a milestone with the announcement that he has filmed his 3000th episode. |
| 28 | Army bandsman and magician Richard Jones wins the tenth series of Britain's Got Talent. |
| 29 | Top Gear relaunches with Chris Evans as presenter. The episode is seen by an average 4.4 million viewers. |
| 29 | ITV airs the 2016 British Soap Awards, which sees Emmerdale win the award for best soap for the first time in the awards' history, while awards for best dramatic performance go to Danny Miller and Lacey Turner for their respective roles as Emmerdale's Aaron Dingle and EastEnders' Stacey Slater. |

=== June ===
| Date | Event |
|---|---|
| 1 | Sharon Osbourne, Nicole Scherzinger and Louis Walsh will return as judges on The X Factor for the forthcoming series, it is confirmed. Dermot O'Leary is also returning as presenter. |
| 3 | Doctor Who executive producer Steven Moffat tells the programme's official magazine that a yet-to-be-named black actor was offered the role of The Doctor, but that "it didn't work out". |
| 4 | Leaked data published by The Daily Telegraph suggests that 37 people have complained about the content of the relaunched Top Gear, in particular jokes presenter Chris Evans made about his predecessor, Jeremy Clarkson. Overnight viewing figures for the 5 June edition of the programme suggest it was seen by an audience of 2.8 million, peaking at 3.3 million, a decrease of almost a third on the 29 May edition's viewership. |
| 6 | Media regulator Ofcom rules that an edition of Channel 4 game show Countdown aired on 21 March breached product placement rules after presenter Nick Hewer talked at length about the Ideal Home Show, which was taking place at London's Olympia at the time. Guest Mark Foster plugged P&O Cruises in the same programme, something that was also found to be in breach of the regulations. In response Channel 4 says the programme's content was reviewed before airing, but by a junior member of the commissioning team, and that in future all content will be authorised by the commissioning editor before broadcast. The content was also removed from the channel's on demand service when it became aware of the issue. |
| 6 | The BBC indicates it will devote fewer hours to television coverage of this year's Glastonbury Festival than has been the case in previous years. The Corporation plans to air 25 hours of Glastonbury 2016, compared to 30 hours in 2014 and 2015. |
| 7 | The Welsh language channel S4C resumes high definition broadcasting, having been forced to close its previous HD service in 2012 due to budget cuts. |
| 8 | The BBC confirm that sitcom Still Game will return for a new series after nearly ten years off air. The series would once again be filmed in Scotland. All original cast would be returning to the series. |
| 8 | A technical fault leads to GEO TEZ falling off air and simulcasting with GEO News. |
| 9 | ITV confirms that Emma Willis will continue to present The Voice UK when it moves to the channel in 2017. However, main host Marvin Humes will not return, having decided to step down from his presenting role. |
| 10 | Comedian and presenter Adil Ray is appointed an OBE in the 2016 Queen's Birthday Honours. Others from the world of television to be honoured include presenters Ant & Dec and actor Brian Blessed, who also receive OBEs, while actress Penelope Wilton becomes a Dame. |
| 16 | The BBC postpones the evening's editions of its political discussion programmes Question Time and This Week following the killing of Labour MP Jo Cox. |
| 16 | Organisers of the Miss Great Britain contest have stripped present incumbent Zara Holland of her title after the model, a participant in the current run of ITV's Love Island, was seen to have slept with a fellow contestant on the previous evening's edition of the show. |
| 16 | The first British television drama to feature a gay kiss is made available by the BBC through streaming, allowing viewers to see it for the first time in four decades. First aired in 1974 as part of BBC Two's drama anthology series Second City Firsts, Girl stars Alison Steadman and tells the story of an affair between two army officers. |
| 17 | The BBC announces Let It Shine, an eight-week talent contest that will see Gary Barlow search for participants to appear in a musical about Take That. Graham Norton and Mel Giedroyc will co-present. |
| 19 | ITV confirms that former Miss Great Britain Zara Holland has left Love Island after learning that her mother had fallen ill. |
| 20 | Ofcom launches an investigation into an edition of ITV's Loose Women aired on 17 May in which Katie Price's teenage son used offensive language while discussing online harassment. The media regulator is also investigating sexual scenes from an edition of Big Brother aired on 12 June, and an item about sex toys that appeared on This Morning on 25 May. |
| 20 | Channel 4 announce plans for an animated adaption of the classic children's book We're Going on a Bear Hunt, featuring Olivia Colman in one of the leading roles. |
| 22 | The BBC consumer affairs programme Watchdog confirms that journalists Steph McGovern and Nikki Fox will join its presenting team. |
| 23–24 | BBC One, ITV and Sky provide through the night coverage of the results of the EU referendum, which sees the UK vote to leave the European Union. |
| 25 | BBC One airs the 1000th episode of Casualty. The episode sees the return of one of the original cast members when Cathy Shipton reprises her role as Lisa Duffin. |
| 25 | Following the EU referendum in which the UK voted to leave the European Union, Newsnight airs a special edition looking at life after Brexit. |
| 25 | Adele headlines the Pyramid Stage at Glastonbury 2016. The set, aired on BBC Two, is watched by a peak audience of 3.7 million, making it the most watched performance to be televised during this year's festival, and giving a single Glastonbury set the largest number of viewers since 2008. |
| 27 | Figures indicate that shares in ITV plunged by £2.5bn (20% of the broadcaster's value) on the day after Britain voted to leave the European Union, prompting fears the company could be vulnerable to a takeover bid. |
| 27 | Radio 1 presenter Matt Edmondson is confirmed as the new host of ITV2's The Xtra Factor, replacing Rochelle Humes and Melvin Odoom. |

=== July ===
| Date | Event |
|---|---|
| 1 | Patrick Holland, current head of documentaries commissioning at the BBC, is appointed to the newly created role of BBC Two channel editor. |
| 4 | Ofcom censures the news channel RT UK after guests on its current affairs show Going Underground accused Turkey of waging a "genocidal war against the Kurds" during an edition aired in March. |
| 4 | Chris Evans announces that he is to step down as presenter of Top Gear, saying he was "not a good fit" for the programme. |
| 4 | ITV confirms it has bought the broadcasting rights for the Lethal Weapon TV series, and will air it in a prime time slot. |
| 4 | It is reported that Andrew Wilson, Lorna Dunkley and Samantha Simmonds are all leaving Sky News as the broadcaster makes financial savings. |
| 5 | The government publishes the Digital Economy Bill, which includes provisions to repeal a law protecting cable platforms from paying copyright or retransmission fees to public sector broadcasters; in response ITV says it will seek to charge Virgin Media for broadcasting its channels. |
| 5 | The BBC announces plans to open a news bureau in Toronto, as well as launching a Canadian edition of the BBC.com website. |
| 5 | The BBC plans to cut almost 100 jobs from its monitoring service in a bid to save £4m from the unit's budget from April 2017. |
| 5 | The BBC comedy Goodnight Sweetheart will return for a one-off special as part of a series sixty years of BBC comedy. |
| 6 | Anne Bulford is appointed as Deputy Director-General of the BBC, becoming the first woman to hold the position; the role had previously been inactive since the departure of the previous incumbent, Mark Byford in 2011. |
| 6 | The BBC have ordered a third series of Poldark, even though the second series will not be broadcast until later in the year. |
| 6 | The Advertising Standards Authority have banned a television commercial for Paddy Power in which a caller to a helpline is told that "even riff raff" could take part in a Cheltenham betting promotion. |
| 7 | The BBC confirms that it will air two Christmas editions of The Great British Bake Off featuring participants from previous series. |
| 7 | Channel 4 confirms it has "no plans" to commission further editions of TFI Friday, which was briefly revived in 2015. |
| 11 | Red Rock, a soap made by Ireland's TV3 and set in and around an actual Dublin Garda station, makes its UK television debut on BBC One. The opening episode draws an audience of 1.1 million (an 18.6% audience share). |
| 13 | The BBC confirms that Len Goodman will leave his role as head judge on Strictly Come Dancing following the next series. |
| 14 | Karen Bradley is appointed as Secretary of State for Culture, Media and Sport, replacing John Whittingdale as Theresa May succeeds David Cameron as Prime Minister. |
| 14 | The BBC announces that it will not merge its BBC News and BBC World News channels. |
| 14 | Sky announces that it will begin showing film and sport content in ultra high definition from 13 August. |
| 18 | Ofcom decides to take further action after receiving viewer complaints about an edition of Sky News from 12 June in which journalist Owen Jones stormed out during the middle of a newspaper review. Presenter Mark Longhurst and fellow guest Julia Hartley-Brewer had dismissed Jones's view that the Orlando nightclub shooting "specifically targeted the LGBT community". However, an episode of ITV2's Love Island that showed footage of two contestants engaging in sexual intercourse shortly after the 9.00 pm watershed on 30 June will be investigated after eight viewers complained about the scenes. |
| 19 | The Independent Press Standards Organisation have received over 1,400 complaints about a column appearing in The Sun in which Kelvin MacKenzie criticised Channel 4 News journalist Fatima Manji for wearing a hijab while reporting on the 2016 Nice truck attack. Manji had co-presented the programme the day after the attack, but MacKenzie questioned whether she should have been allowed to do so. Manji also subsequently makes a complaint to the press watchdog. |
| 20 | Les Dennis confirms he will leave his Coronation Street role as Michael Rodwell later in the year. |
| 21 | The BBC confirms plans to adapt Victor Hugo's novel Les Misérables into a six-part series. |
| 21 | The BBC has releases a collection celebrating the screenwriting of Alan Bleasdale, including his rarely seen first television work from 1975, Early To Bed. |
| 22 | ITV announce that television presenter Anita Rani and chef James Martin will present This Morning on Fridays during the summer, as Eamonn Holmes and Ruth Langsford present the rest of the week. |
| 22 | ITV announces Dance Dance Dance, a celebrity-based programme that recreates classic dance routines, for 2017. |
| 26 | Jason Burrill wins the seventeenth series of Big Brother. |
| 29 | Alexis Conran wins the eleventh series of Celebrity MasterChef. |

=== August ===
| Date | Event |
|---|---|
| 1 | Ofcom clears ITV show Loose Women over an edition in which Katie Price's son swore during a discussion about cyberbullying. |
| 5 | Actor Christopher Biggins is removed from the eighteenth series of Celebrity Big Brother after making a number of comments that the programme describes as "capable of causing great offence to housemates and the viewing public". The remarks included claims that AIDS was spread by bisexuals, for which Biggins received a warning from the show's producers prior to his removal, and a joke about the Holocaust made to a Jewish housemate, which was broadcast. |
| 9 | Nadiya Hussain, winner of the sixth series of The Great British Bake Off will be a judge on a junior version of the series, it is reported. She will join chef and food writer Allegra McEvedy for Junior Bake Off. |
| 10 | ITV announces that Stephen Moyer will take a lead role in Safe House alongside Zoe Tapper when the drama returns for a second series. |
| 11 | The BBC has signed Gabby Logan to present The Premier League Show, a midweek BBC Two magazine programme focusing on the Premier League, beginning on 25 August. Gary Lineker will also present a slot on the show. |
| 13 | Gary Lineker presents the opening edition of the 2016–17 run of Match of the Day in his underpants, having pledged to do so if Leicester City won the Premier League, which they did earlier in the year. |
| 16 | Kelvin Fletcher makes his final appearance as Emmerdale character Andy Sugden after 20 years with the show. |
| 17 | The BBC says that its well-known weather presenters will continue to appear on screen when MeteoGroup succeeds the Met Office as its weather forecast provider. |
| 17 | The Advertising Standards Authority bans a commercial for a Walkers Crisps competition offering 20,000 holidays following complaints the prizes were almost impossible to win. |
| 18 | Sky News consumer affairs correspondent Poppy Trowbridge is appointed as a special adviser to the Chancellor Philip Hammond. |
| 18 | ITV announces that it will switch off its seven channels for an hour at 9.30 am on 27 August as part of the "I Am Team GB" campaign, which seeks to encourage greater participation in sport and will be staged to coincide with the homecoming of Team GB after Rio 2016. |
| 18 | Comedian Miranda Hart confirms she will not reprise her role as Call the Midwife Chummy Brown when it returns for a sixth series. |
| 19 | EastEnders producers confirm that Rita Simons and Samantha Womack (who play Roxy and Ronnie Mitchell) are to leave the series after nine years. |
| 19 | Channel 4 confirms that Deal or No Deal will end in the winter to make room for The Great British Bake Off which will move from the BBC at the start of next year. The programme will tour famous British landmarks before its conclusion. Presenter Noel Edmonds will stay with Channel 4 to work on other projects for the broadcaster. |
| 19 | Sky News confirms that presenter Mark Longhurst is to leave the broadcaster after sixteen years. |
| 21 | The BBC confirms it has sold the rights to theme tunes and music from shows including Luther, Doctor Who and Wolf Hall to BMG. |
| 22 | Research conducted by commercial TV marketing body Thinkbox suggests that the BBC experienced a 20% drop in younger viewers in the months following the closure of BBC Three, while channels such as ITV2 and E4 have benefited in terms of viewers from BBC Three's disappearance from the airwaves. |
| 25 | Comedian Kevin Bishop is to play UK Independence Party leader Nigel Farage in Nigel Farage Gets His Life Back, a one-off BBC Two documentary about the politician's life. |
| 26 | ITV announces plans for two new game shows—a UK version of the popular US children's talent show, Little Big Shots presented by Dawn French, and Harry Hill's Alien Fun Capsule, a series where two teams are tasked with saving Earth from an alien invasion, presented by Harry Hill. |
| 26 | Channel 4 is named channel of the year at the Edinburgh International Television Festival. |
| 26 | Stephen Bear wins the eighteenth series of Celebrity Big Brother. |
| 27 | ITV switches off its seven channels for an hour for the I Am Team GB sporting initiative. The channels are turned off by gymnast Max Whitlock, who won two golds for Great Britain at the Rio Olympics. |
| 27 | BBC One airs a feature-length-episode of Casualty to mark the show's 30th anniversary. |
| 28 | BBC One airs new episodes of Are You Being Served? and Porridge as part of its season celebrating 60 years of British sitcoms, while ITV airs the first episode of its series Victoria starring Jenna Coleman as Queen Victoria. Overnight viewing figures indicate that 5.4 million viewers saw Victoria, as opposed to 5 million for Are You Being Served? and 4.4 million for Porridge. |
| 30 | BBC One has commissioned a three-part adaptation of Jessie Burton's debut novel, The Miniaturist. |

=== September ===
| Date | Event | |
|---|---|---|
| 1 | Following a change in the law regarding TV licensing, internet users are required to buy a licence to view content from BBC iPlayer. | |
| 1 | Eamonn Holmes announces he is to leave Sky News Sunrise after eleven years. | |
| 2 | BBC One airs a one-off special of Goodnight Sweetheart and a prequel to Keeping Up Appearances as part of its 60th anniversary of comedy celebrations. | |
| 3 | Claudia Winkleman announces she is to leave BBC One's film review series, Film after six years. | |
| 5 | Cold Feet returns to ITV with a new series after a thirteen-year absence. | |
| 6 | BBC Two announces that it will dedicate its Saturday night scheduling to the arts from 1 October and throughout the autumn season, with programmes about literature, cinema and music. | |
| 6 | Channel 5 announces it has secured the free to air rights to Formula E with every race airing live on the channel, Plus qualifying will be aired live on Spike until 2018 | |
| 6 | Jeremy Thompson, anchor of Sky News's Live at Five, announces he will retire later in the year to "make space for burgeoning young talent". | |
| 7 | It is agreed that the BBC will provide £74.5m a year funding to S4C from the licence fee until 2022. | |
| 8 | BBC One airs a special edition of Question Time ahead of the Labour leadership election featuring Jeremy Corbyn and Owen Smith. The edition is broadcast at the earlier time of 9.00 pm. | |
| 11 | Shadow Foreign Secretary Emily Thornberry accuses Sky News presenter Dermot Murnaghan of sexism and of posing "pub quiz" style questions after he asked her to name the French foreign minister during an interview. | |
| 12 | Channel 4 have signed a three-year contract with Love Productions to air The Great British Bake Off from 2017, meaning the programme will move from the BBC after the end of the current series. | |
| 13 | Mel Giedroyc and Sue Perkins announce they will leave their Great British Bake Off presenting roles when the series moves to Channel 4. | |
| 14 | Rona Fairhead announces she will step down as chair of the BBC Trust, and will not apply to join its planned replacement. | |
| 14 | Martin Kemp and Dannii Minogue are announced as judges on BBC One's forthcoming Take That talent search Let It Shine. They will join Gary Barlow and Amber Riley on the panel. | |
| 15 | Sarah-Jane Mee will replace Eamonn Holmes as co-presenter of Sky News Sunrise. She will be joined by Jonathan Samuels. | |
| 16 | ITV and Simon Cowell announce a new deal to keep The X Factor and Britain's Got Talent airing on the channel until 2019. | |
| 21 | Channel 4 and IPC announce a letter of intent for the broadcaster to remain as Great Britain's Paralympic and ParaAthletics World Championships rights holder until 2020. | |
| 22 | Mary Berry announces she will not move to Channel 4 with The Great British Bake Off because of loyalty to the BBC, while Paul Hollywood signs a three-year contract to continue with the show. | |
| 25 | Pakistani-born actor Marc Anwar, who plays Coronation Street character Sharif Nazir, is sacked from the series after posting racially offensive comments about Indians on Twitter. | |
| 26 | Matt LeBlanc signs a deal to present the relaunched Top Gear when it returns for a second series. It also confirmed that Sabine Schmitz, Eddie Jordan, Rory Reid and Chris Harris will remain with the show | that same day, Roger Cook (journalist) presented a special edtion of BBC's Inside Out West on the criminal John Palmer (criminal) following his death last year (in what would be one of Roger's final TV Appearances before his death from cancer in June 2026). |
| 27 | Users of BBC iPlayer must create and login to a BBC user account, known as a BBC ID, from 2017, it is announced. From this date, BBC ID holders must also provide a postcode. | |
| 28 | Sir Tom Jones confirms he will return as a judge on The Voice UK in 2017, when it moves to ITV. | |
| 28 | ITV airs the 9000th episode of Coronation Street. | |

=== October ===
| Date | Event |
|---|---|
| 6 | The BBC have commissioned a full series of the updated Porridge, as well as new comedy Motherland. |
| 7 | Former Deputy Prime Minister Nick Clegg presents his first edition of Have I Got News for You. |
| 8 | An online campaign to raise £50,000 for actress Leah Bracknell to undergo lung cancer treatment reaches its target three days after being launched. Bracknell, who played Zoe Tate in Emmerdale, established the fund to undergo the treatment in Germany. |
| 10 | Ofcom says that it will not launch an investigation into an Emmerdale storyline involving dognapping. The watchdog had received 550 complaints from viewers over the episodes, aired in September, amid concerns the plot could encourage copycat incidents. |
| 11 | Singer Will Young announces he has withdrawn from the fourteenth series of Strictly Come Dancing, citing personal reasons for his decision to leave. |
| 11 | The BBC is forced to defend Strictly against allegations of racism after the departure of EastEnders actor Tameka Empson the previous weekend, who became the second black contestant to be voted off in as many weeks. |
| 12 | A BT advertising campaign featuring Deadpool actor Ryan Reynolds has been banned by the Advertising Standards Authority following a complaint from rival Virgin Media that campaign's claims about broadband speed were misleading. |
| 13 | Eamonn Holmes presents his last Sky News Sunrise after eleven years. |
| 13 | Nadiya Hussain rules out of presenting The Great British Bake Off after signing a deal to front programmes for the BBC. |
| 14 | Jean Alexander, who played Hilda Ogden in Coronation Street for 23 years, dies aged 90. |
| 14 | ITV says it is "disappointed" after the government gives the go-ahead for a new tram route in Manchester that will pass the Coronation Street set, fearing it will disrupt filming of the soap. |
| 14 | BBC Breakfast presenters Charlie Stayt and Naga Munchetty apologise after footage of a gorilla was shown while introducing an item concerning First Minister of Scotland Nicola Sturgeon. |
| 17 | Sarah-Jane Mee presents her first edition of Sky News Sunrise, co-presenting with Jonathan Samuels. |
| 17 | UTV gets a brand new look in which the station idents, based on those used by ITV since a major rebrand in January 2013, include the UTV logo changing colour as it blends in on a live-action scene – a process known as "colour picking". |
| 17 | ITV confirms it has recommissioned the reboot of Cold Feet for a second series. |
| 17 | The final series of Deal or No Deal begins on Channel 4. |
| 20 | Former Coronation Street actress Tracy Brabin is elected as the MP for Batley and Spen in the by-election triggered by the killing of Jo Cox earlier in the year. |
| 21 | The BBC has commissioned a two-part adaptation of Roald Dahl's 1982 work Revolting Rhymes which will be aired over Christmas. |
| 24 | Sky News broadcasts from Studio 21 based within Sky Central, Sky's new headquarters in London for the first time. The first bulletin to be broadcast from Studio 21 was at 11 am presented by Colin Brazier and Jayne Secker. |
| 26 | The Advertising Standards Authority has banned a commercial for Diet Chef featuring a tearful woman meeting a slimmer and happier version of herself, branding the advert as "irresponsible" since the watchdog felt it implied happiness and self-confidence could only be achieved through weight loss. |
| 26 | Mark Austin announces he is to leave ITV News after 30 years. |
| 26 | Candice Brown wins the seventh series of The Great British Bake Off. Overnight viewing figures indicate the programme is watched by an average 14 million viewers (peaking at 14.8 million when Brown was named as the winner), giving the show its highest ever audience. |
| 27 | Aleksandra King quits the twelfth series of The Apprentice as her team are about to begin a task, becoming the first contestant to leave the series in such circumstances. |
| 28 | Mel and Sue have been signed up to present a new BBC One Saturday evening show, Let's Sing and Dance For Comic Relief, their first post-Great British Bake Off presenting roles. |
| 28 | Prue Leith announces she will leave her role as a judge on BBC Two's The Great British Menu after eleven years. |

=== November ===
| Date | Event |
|---|---|
| 2 | BBC Television celebrates its 80th anniversary. |
| 6 | The Next Great Magician debuts on ITV. |
| 8–9 | The BBC, ITV and Sky News provide coverage of the 2016 US presidential election results, which sees a shock win for Donald Trump. |
| 9 | Peaky Blinders actress Charlotte Riley has been cast as Catherine, Duchess of Cambridge in a forthcoming adaptation of the stage play King Charles III for BBC Two. |
| 10 | Jeremy Thompson presents his last Sky News bulletin on location from Washington, D.C. |
| 15 | Having decided not to move to Channel 4 with The Great British Bake Off, Mary Berry is given a new BBC cookery series, Everyday, which will air on BBC Two. She will also host Secrets from Britain's Great Houses on BBC One. |
| 15 | David Mitchell and Robert Webb will reunite to star in new Channel 4 comedy Back, the broadcaster has announced. |
| 16 | BBC Breakfast business presenter Victoria Fritz goes into labour shortly after coming off air, later giving birth to a boy at Manchester's St Mary's Hospital. |
| 17 | Launch of Jeremy Clarkson's motoring series The Grand Tour on Amazon's video streaming service. |
| 17 | Former Blue Peter presenter Janet Ellis is shortlisted for the 2016 Bad Sex in Fiction Award for her novel The Butcher's Hook. But she is beaten to the accolade by Erri De Luca's The Day Before Happiness. |
| 18 | Children in Need 2016 is aired on BBC One. The fundraiser is the first to take place since the death of Sir Terry Wogan, and tributes are paid to him throughout the evening. The 2016 event raises a record £46.6m. |
| 23 | The BBC announces it has commissioned Call the Midwife for a further three series, as well as three Christmas specials, which will see the show's storylines moving into the mid sixties. |
| 25 | As part of a new contract between the BBC and Lottery operator Camelot Group, BBC One Controller Charlotte Moore announces that the Saturday evening National Lottery Draw will no longer air live on BBC One from 2017. The draw will be shown via BBC iPlayer only from 7 January. |
| 25 | ITV has commissioned The Nightly Show, a five-nights-a-week entertainment show for 2017. The programme's initial eight-week run will see it go out at 10.00 pm, meaning News at Ten will air at 10.30 pm. |
| 26 | Pranksters invade the stage during an edition of The X Factor requiring police to attend the scene. |
| 29 | The British Film Institute announce that over 100,000 television programmes are to be digitised before the video tape formats become obsolete, the tapes currently have an estimated five-to-six-year shelf life no matter how great the environment of the vaults in which they are stored. BFI aim to make sure that the television archive is still there in 200 years' time. |
| 29 | Sky Sports dismisses former darts world champion Eric Bristow from his presenting role after comments he made about victims of the United Kingdom football sexual abuse scandal, who he claimed were not "proper men". |

=== December ===
| Date | Event |
|---|---|
| 1 | Playwright James Graham tells BBC News he is working on a TV series about the EU referendum. |
| 4 | Scarlett Moffatt wins the sixteenth series of I'm a Celebrity...Get Me Out of Here!. |
| 6 | A candidate put forward by Ofcom to be a Channel 4 board member, who was then rejected for the role by the government is named as Althea Efunshile, a former deputy chair of Arts Council England. |
| 8 | ITV announce plans to revive Blankety Blank for a one-off special to air on 24 December. Those involved in the reboot include the Chuckle Brothers. |
| 8 | Actor Tom Hardy will read the CBeebies bedtime story on New Year's Eve, it is announced. The story will be You Must Bring a Hat by Simon Philip and Kate Hindley. |
| 9 | 21st Century Fox launch a £18.5bn bid to take full control of British Sky Broadcasting, a company of which they currently have a 39.1% share. |
| 9 | Robbie Williams will be among singers to perform at the 2016 BBC Sports Personality of the Year Awards. Others to appear will include Laura Mvula, and Gareth Malone and the Invictus Choir. |
| 9 | BBC One airs the British television premiere of Adele in New York City, a concert recorded by Adele at New York's Radio City Music Hall for NBC in 2015. |
| 11 | Matt Terry wins the thirteenth series of The X Factor. On 16 December, his debut single, "When Christmas Comes Around" enters the UK Singles Chart at number three. |
| 14 | Nicky Morgan, a former Secretary of State for Education pulls out of a planned appearance on the 16 December edition of Have I Got News for You following controversy caused by her criticism of Prime Minister Theresa May after she was photographed in a pair of £995 leather trousers for a Sunday Times article. Her place as Paul Merton's teammate is taken by a leather handbag. |
| 14 | The Advertising Standards Authority has banned an advertisement for the Emmerdale studio tour amid concerns it was misleading, following complaints the advert had "exaggerated" the experience. |
| 14 | Swimmer Ellie Robinson is named 2016 BBC Young Sports Personality of the Year. |
| 15 | Sky and 21st Century Fox agree a takeover deal worth £18.5bn. |
| 17 | Ore Oduba and dance partner Joanne Clifton win the fourteenth series of Strictly Come Dancing. Overnight viewing figures indicate the 2016 final of Strictly was watched by 13.1 million viewers. |
| 18 | Tennis player Andy Murray, winner of the 2016 Wimbledon Championships and the men's singles at the 2016 Summer Olympics, is named this year's BBC Sports Personality of the Year, winning the award for a record third time. The 2015–16 Premier League champions Leicester City are named Team of the Year. |
| 18 | Alana Spencer wins the twelfth series of The Apprentice. In December 2017 her company, Ridiculously Rich by Alana, is forced to recall almost all of its products after a Food Standards Agency investigation identifies issues with incorrect labelling. |
| 20 | ITV airs a special episode of Emmerdale. The 30-minute prospective episode, is seen completely through the eyes of Vascular dementia patient Ashley Thomas (John Middleton). To achieve a realistic portrayal of the confusion surrounding dementia, stand-in actors were used, additional sets, props, and specialist directed camera affects and shots. In addition external scenes and The Woolpack interior scenes were both shot at Esholt In an attempt to show a skewed, unfamiliar view of the village as perceived by Ashley. Esholt was the previously used exterior set from 1976 to 1997. |
| 22 | The BBC announces a new entertainment show for 2017 aimed at finding the UK's best singing group, with the provisional title Pitch Battle. |
| 22 | Mark Austin presents his last ITV Evening News alongside Mary Nightingale. |
| 22 | Former Crimewatch presenter Jacqui Hames is to seek a judicial review of the culture secretary's decision to consult on whether to go ahead with part two of the Leveson Inquiry, it is reported. |
| 22 | Gary Maclean wins the ninth series of MasterChef: The Professionals. |
| 23 | Ofcom publishes its annual list of shows that received the largest number of complaints during the year. Celebrity Big Brother 18 attracted the most complaints during 2016, with 3,643 contacting the regulator about the show. |
| | After 11 years on air, Deal or No Deal airs its final episode. |
| 24 | Michelle Fowler makes a surprise Christmas Eve return to EastEnders, the character having been recast more than twenty years after exiting the series. Having been previously played by Susan Tully, the role has now been taken over by Jenna Russell. |
| 24 | ITV screens Harry Potter and the Philosopher's Stone, beginning a run of all eight films in the Harry Potter series, showing one film each day over the festive season, and concluding with Harry Potter and the Deathly Hallows – Part 2 on New Year's Eve. |
| 25 | Melvin Odoom, who was the first contestant to be eliminated from this year's series of Strictly Come Dancing, wins the show's Christmas Special. Overnight viewing figures indicate the programme was seen by an audience of 7.2 million, making it the most watched single programme of Christmas Day. Only the Queen's Christmas message, broadcast by both BBC One and ITV, achieved a higher audience, with 7.7 million for its collective viewership. Eight of the top ten most programmes on 25 December, including the network television premiere of Disney's Frozen, were aired on BBC One. Christmas Day also sees the final edition of The Great British Bake Off to air on BBC One; the programme is seen by 6.3 million viewers. Figures released by BARB in early January 2017 indicate Call the Midwife to be the most popular programme of Christmas Day, with 9.2 million viewers, followed by Mrs Brown's Boys (9 million) and Strictly Come Dancing (8.9 million) and The Great British Bake Off (8.2). BARB's figures suggest that audiences for 25 December fell to their lowest in 2016 since the current system of recording television viewing figures was introduced in 1981. |
| 25 | Brendan Cox, husband of murdered MP Jo Cox, delivers this year's Alternative Christmas message for Channel 4. |
| 27 | Following the death of George Michael on Christmas Day, BBC One airs George Michael at the Palais Garnier, Paris, a concert given by the singer in 2012. |
| 27 | The final edition of Channel 4 Racing is broadcast before moving to ITV from New Year's Day 2017 onwards. |
| 30 | Those from the world of television recognised in the 2017 New Year Honours include Ken Dodd who is knighted, Patricia Routledge who receives a Damehood, and Helen McCrory who becomes an OBE. However, former Watchdog presenter Lynn Faulds Wood declines an MBE, arguing that the honours system is unfair and that she would be a hypocrite to accept one. |
| 30 | A bath scene from the second series of Poldark is voted the biggest television moment of 2016 by readers of RadioTimes.com. |
| 31 | Gaby Roslin presents the final National Lottery Draw to air on BBC One. |

== Debuts ==
=== BBC ===
| Date | Debut | Channel |
|---|---|---|
| 1 January | Billionaire Boy | BBC One |
| 1 January | The Joy of Rachmaninov | BBC Four |
| 3 January | My Mediterranean with Adrian Chiles | BBC Two |
| 3 January | War & Peace | BBC One |
| 4 January | For What It's Worth | BBC One |
| 4 January | Immortal Egypt with Joann Fletcher | BBC Two |
| 4 January | Insert Name Here | BBC Two |
| 4 January | I Know What You Weighed Last Summer | BBC Three |
| 5 January | Victorian Bakers | BBC Two |
| 5 January | You Make Me Feel Like Dancing | BBC Two |
| 6 January | Empire of the Tsars: Romanov Russia with Lucy Worsley | BBC Four |
| 6 January | Got What It Takes? | CBBC |
| 8 January | What to Buy and Why | BBC Two |
| 9 January | Spot Bots | CBeebies |
| 11 January | Tracey Ullman's Show | BBC One |
| 16 January | The Getaway Car | BBC One |
| 17 January | The Rack Pack | BBC iPlayer |
| 19 January | Phone Shop Idol | BBC Two |
| 20 January | The Brain with David Eagleman | BBC Four |
| 21 January | The Story of China | BBC Two |
| 22 January | Bad Language | BBC One Northern Ireland |
| 24 January | Attenborough and the Giant Dinosaur | BBC One |
| 25 January | Island Stories | BBC Two |
| 25 January | Mary Berry's Foolproof Cooking | BBC Two |
| 26 January | The Real Marigold Hotel | BBC Two |
| 26 January | Murder Games: The Life and Death of Breck Bednar | BBC Three |
| 27 January | Stonehenge: A Timewatch Guide | BBC Four |
| 1 February | Class Dismissed | CBBC |
| 1 February | Great American Railroad Journeys | BBC Two |
| 1 February | Rise of the Superstar Vloggers | BBC Three |
| 2 February | The Supergamers | BBC Three |
| 3 February | Webcam Boys | BBC Three |
| 4 February | Sea Cities | BBC Two |
| 4 February | Cats V Dogs: Which Is Best? | BBC Two |
| 5 February | Earth's Greatest Spectacles | BBC Two |
| 7 February | Greece with Simon Reeve | BBC Two |
| 8 February | Pocket Money Pitch | CBBC |
| 8 February | Rick Stein's Taste of Shanghai | BBC Two |
| 8 February | The Best Dishes Ever | BBC Two |
| 9 February | Professor Green: Hidden and Homeless | BBC Three |
| 10 February | How To Die: Simon's Choice | BBC Two |
| 15 February | The Renaissance Unchained | BBC Four |
| 15 February | The Not So Secret Life of the Manic Depressive: 10 Years On | BBC One |
| 17 February | One Child | BBC Two |
| 19 February | The Man Who Witnessed 219 Executions | BBC Three |
| 20 February | Airmageddon | CBBC |
| 20 February | Kipling's Indian Adventure | BBC Two |
| 21 February | The Night Manager | BBC One |
| 22 February | Food: Truth or Scare | BBC One |
| 23 February | Who's the Boss? | BBC Two |
| 24 February | The Prosecutors: Real Crime and Punishment | BBC Four |
| 27 February | Stag | BBC Two |
| 28 February | Thirteen | BBC Three |
| 29 February | Too Much TV | BBC Two |
| 1 March | The Last Seabird Summer? | BBC Four |
| 3 March | Pompeii: New Secrets Revealed with Mary Beard | BBC One |
| 4 March | Land of Hope and Glory – British Country Life | BBC Two |
| 6 March | Steve Backshall's Extreme Mountain Challenge | BBC Two |
| 7 March | All Over the Workplace | CBBC |
| 7 March | Frontline Doctors: Winter Migrant Crisis | BBC One |
| 7 March | This Farming Life | BBC Two |
| 8 March | Sex in Strange Places | BBC Three |
| 9 March | Shop Well for Less? | BBC One |
| 10 March | The Secret History of My Family | BBC Two |
| 14 March | Diddy TV | CBBC |
| 15 March | Mary Berry's Easter Feast | BBC Two |
| 20 March | Tribes, Predators & Me | BBC Two |
| 21 March | Think Tank | BBC One |
| 22 March | The A Word | BBC One |
| 23 March | Employable Me | BBC Two |
| 24 March | Flat TV | BBC Three |
| 26 March | Can't Touch This | BBC One |
| 27 March | Paul O'Grady: The Sally Army & Me | BBC One |
| 27 March | Natural Born Winners | BBC Two |
| 29 March | Bake Off: Crème de la Crème | BBC Two |
| 29 March | Murdered by My Father | BBC Three |
| 30 March | Delete, Delete, Delete | BBC One Northern Ireland |
| 1 April | Two Doors Down | BBC Two |
| 3 April | Life in the Air | BBC One |
| 3 April | Undercover | BBC One |
| 12 April | Europe: Them or Us | BBC Two |
| 13 April | Five Star Babies: Inside the Portland Hospital | BBC Two |
| 13 April | Normal for Norfolk | BBC Two |
| 15 April | Food Detectives | BBC Two |
| 18 April | The Code | BBC One |
| 18 April | Peter Kay's Comedy Shuffle | BBC One |
| 18 April | I Want My Wife Back | BBC One |
| 18 April | The Hairy Bikers' Pubs That Built Britain | BBC Two |
| 20 April | Caravaner of the Year | BBC Two |
| 21 April | Elizabeth at 90: A Family Portrait | BBC One |
| 21 April | Aliens: The Big Think | BBC Four |
| 22 April | Rick Stein's Long Weekends | BBC Two |
| 22 April | Witless | BBC Three |
| 22 April | The Everly Brothers: Harmonies from Heaven | BBC Four |
| 22 April | Billy Fury: The Sound of Fury | BBC Four |
| 24 April | Louis Theroux: Drinking to Oblivion | BBC Two |
| 25 April | Zig and Zag | CBBC |
| 27 April | Mary Beard's Ultimate Rome: Empire Without Limit | BBC Two |
| 29 April | Down on the Farm | CBeebies |
| 1 May | Stupid Man, Smart Phone | BBC Three |
| 1 May | The Silk Road | BBC Four |
| 1 May | Redefining Juliet | BBC Four |
| 5 May | Gareth's Invictus Choir | BBC One |
| 6 May | Nick Baker's Wild West | BBC Two |
| 6 May | The Extraordinary Collector | BBC Two |
| 7 May | The Hollow Crown: The Wars of the Roses | BBC Two |
| 7 May | Attenborough's Passion Projects | BBC Two |
| 8 May | Attenborough at 90 | BBC One |
| 8 May | Burma's Secret Jungle War with Joe Simpson | BBC Two |
| 9 May | Choose the Right Puppy for You | BBC Two |
| 9 May | Attenborough's Life That Glows | BBC Two |
| 9 May | Upstart Crow | BBC Two |
| 10 May | Old School | BBC Two |
| 11 May | Nature's Epic Journeys | BBC One |
| 11 May | Cunk on Shakespeare | BBC Two |
| 13 May | Mum | BBC Two |
| 15 May | Louis Theroux: A Different Brain | BBC Two |
| 18 May | Lose Weight for Love | BBC One |
| 18 May | Bodyhack: Metal Gear Man | BBC Three |
| 19 May | Dan Cruickshank: At Home with the British | BBC Four |
| 19 May | Going Forward | BBC Four |
| 20 May | Love, Nina | BBC One |
| 20 May | No Such Thing as the News | BBC Two |
| 24 May | Last Whites of the East End | BBC One |
| 29 May | Extra Gear | BBC Three |
| 30 May | A Midsummer Night's Dream | BBC One |
| 1 June | The Big C and Me | BBC One |
| 1 June | Versailles | BBC Two |
| 3 June | UK's Best Part-Time Band | BBC Four |
| 5 June | City in the Sky | BBC Two |
| 6 June | Reg | BBC One |
| 7 June | Jack Dee's Referendum Helpdesk | BBC Two |
| 9 June | New Blood | BBC One |
| 9 June | MAKE! Craft Britain | BBC Four |
| 10 June | The Millionaire's Holiday Club | BBC Two |
| 15 June | Koko: The Gorilla Who Talks to People | BBC One |
| 20 June | Kazoops! | CBeebies |
| 21 June | Mr v Mrs: Call the Meditator | BBC Two |
| 24 June | Stacey Dooley: Hate and Pride in Orlando | BBC Three |
| 28 June | The Living and the Dead | BBC One |
| 4 July | Matron, Medicine and Me: 70 Years of the NHS | BBC One |
| 4 July | Forces of Nature | BBC One |
| 4 July | Just Call Me Martina | BBC One |
| 4 July | The Secret Life of Children's Books | BBC Four |
| 5 July | Reggie Yates in the Mexican Drug War | BBC Three |
| 5 July | B is for Book | BBC Four |
| 11 July | Garden Rescue | BBC One |
| 11 July | Red Rock | BBC One |
| 11 July | The Hairy Builder | BBC Two |
| 11 July | Exodus: Our Journey to Europe | BBC Two |
| 11 July | Trainspotting Live | BBC Four |
| 12 July | Sex, Drugs & Murder: Life in the Red Light Zone | BBC Three |
| 13 July | Saving Lives at Sea | BBC One |
| 15 July | People's History of Pop | BBC Four |
| 17 July | The Secret Agent | BBC One |
| 19 July | New Zealand: Earth's Mythical Islands | BBC Two |
| 21 July | The Refugee Camp: Our Desert Home | BBC Two |
| 21 July | Fleabag | BBC Three |
| 22 July | Clare Balding Meets... | BBC Two |
| 23 July | The Marvellous World of Roald Dahl | BBC Two |
| 24 July | Fixing Dad | BBC Two |
| 25 July | Bottersnikes and Gumbles | CBBC |
| 25 July | Unsolved: The Boy Who Disappeared | BBC Three |
| 5 August | Highlands: Scotland's Wild Heart | BBC Two |
| 6 August | The Mystery of Van Gogh's Ear | BBC Two |
| 8 August | Hacker's Olympic Rundown | CBBC |
| 17 August | Skies Above Britain | BBC Two |
| 22 August | Debatable | BBC Two |
| 22 August | Make Me an Egghead | BBC Two |
| 22 August | Britain's Hardest Workers: Inside the Low Wage Economy | BBC Two |
| 23 August | One of Us | BBC One |
| 25 August | The Premier League Show | BBC Two |
| 27 August | The Truth Commissioner | BBC Two |
| 30 August | New York: America's Busiest City | BBC Two |
| 30 August | Home from Home | BBC Two |
| 30 August | All Together Now: The Great Orchestra Challenge | BBC Four |
| 1 September | Ingenious Animals | BBC One |
| 1 September | Our Ex Wife | BBC Two |
| 1 September | Man like Mobeen | BBC Three |
| 1 September | Fail | BBC Three |
| 1 September | The JPD | BBC Three |
| 1 September | A Brief History of Tim | BBC Three |
| 1 September | Limbo | BBC Three |
| 1 September | Pumped | BBC Three |
| 3 September | Rank the Prank | CBBC |
| 4 September | A Very British Deterrent | BBC Two |
| 5 September | Dom on the Spot | BBC One |
| 5 September | Yes Chef | BBC One |
| 5 September | We the Jury | BBC Two |
| 6 September | Motherland | BBC Two |
| 8 September | Absolutely Fashion: Inside British Vogue | BBC Two |
| 9 September | We Love Sitcom | BBC One |
| 11 September | Marr on Scotland | BBC Two |
| 12 September | Top Class | CBBC |
| 13 September | Obesity – The Post Mortem | BBC Three |
| 20 September | The Trouble with My Dad | BBC Three |
| 21 September | Conviction: Murder at the Station | BBC Two |
| 26 September | Street Auction | BBC One |
| 26 September | Morgana Robinson's The Agency | BBC Two |
| 26 September | The Retreat with Nick Knowles | BBC Two |
| 27 September | Ambulance | BBC One |
| 28 September | Britain's Lost Masterpieces | BBC Four |
| 3 October | Going Back Giving Back | BBC One |
| 6 October | Anne Robinson's Britain | BBC One |
| 9 October | Wild West: America's Great Frontier | BBC Two |
| 10 October | The Victorian Slum | BBC Two |
| 10 October | Little Roy | CBBC |
| 10 October | The Great Butterfly Adventure: Africa to Britain with the Painted Lady | BBC Four |
| 14 October | The Story of Skinhead with Don Letts | BBC Four |
| 16 October | The Greatest Tomb on Earth: Secrets of Ancient China | BBC Two |
| 17 October | Sleuths, Spies & Sorcerers: Andrew Marr's Paperback Heroes | BBC Four |
| 18 October | American High School: Straight Outta Orangeburg | BBC Three |
| 18 October | Aberfan: The Fight for Justice | BBC Four |
| 22 October | Class | BBC Three |
| 24 October | Saving Africa's Elephants: Hugh and the Ivory War | BBC One |
| 30 October | Operation Gold Rush with Dan Snow | BBC Two |
| 30 October | Books That Made Britain | BBC Four |
| 31 October | The Moonstone | BBC One |
| 1 November | Arctic Live | BBC Two |
| 1 November | The Choir: Gareth's Best in Britain | BBC Two |
| 2 November | Television's Opening Night: How the Box was Born | BBC Four |
| 6 November | Planet Earth II | BBC One |
| 9 November | Black and British: A Forgotten History | BBC Two |
| 9 November | Black Is the New Black | BBC Two |
| 10 November | Close to the Enemy | BBC Two |
| 10 November | No Body's Perfect | BBC Four |
| 13 November | My Mother and Other Strangers | BBC One |
| 13 November | Sunny D | BBC Three |
| 14 November | The Secret Life of The Hospital Bed | BBC One |
| 21 November | III Gotten Gains | BBC One |
| 21 November | The Last Miners | BBC One |
| 21 November | Back in Time for Brixton | BBC Two |
| 25 November | Walliams and Friend | BBC One |
| 28 November | The Big Food Rescue | BBC One |
| 29 November | Rillington Place | BBC One |
| 7 December | Six Wives with Lucy Worsley | BBC One |
| 7 December | The Big Life Fix with Simon Reeve | BBC Two |
| 12 December | Muslims Like Us | BBC Two |
| 19 December | Lenny Henry | BBC Two |
| 20 December | Inside the Christmas Factory | BBC Two |
| 24 December | Alan Bennett's Diaries | BBC Two |
| 25 December | Dancing the Nutcracker: Inside the Royal Ballet | BBC Two |
| 25 December | King Lear | BBC Four |
| 26 December | Revolting Rhymes | BBC One |
| 26 December | The Witness for the Prosecution | BBC One |
| 26 December | Gordon Buchanan: Elephant Family & Me | BBC Two |
| 26 December | The Entire Universe | BBC Two |
| 28 December | Ethel & Ernest | BBC One |
| 29 December | To Walk Invisible | BBC One |
| 29 December | Life in the Snow | BBC One |

=== ITV ===
| Date | Debut | Channel |
|---|---|---|
| 3 January | Beowulf: Return to the Shieldlands | ITV |
| 4 January | Griff's Great Britain | ITV |
| 5 January | Trawlermen Tales | ITV |
| 5 January | Saved | ITV |
| 7 January | Jericho | ITV |
| 10 January | Bear Grylls' Survival School | CITV |
| 21 January | Fearne & Gok: Off The Rails | ITVBe |
| 26 January | Sugar Free Farm | ITV |
| 15 February | Masterpiece with Alan Titchmarsh | ITV |
| 16 February | It's Not Rocket Science | ITV |
| 19 February | Best Walks with a View with Julia Bradbury | ITV |
| 23 February | The Inspectors Are Coming | ITV |
| 28 February | Churchill's Secret | ITV |
| 29 February | Davina McCall: Life at the Extreme | ITV |
| 3 March | The Cruise | ITV |
| 6 March | The Story of Cats | ITV |
| 6 March | Doctor Thorne | ITV |
| 13 March | Houdini & Doyle | ITV Encore |
| 17 March | @elevenish | ITV2 |
| 28 March | Gok's Lunchbox | ITV |
| 28 March | Maigret | ITV |
| 1 April | Billy Connolly's Tracks Across America | ITV |
| 3 April | The Durrells | ITV |
| 4 April | Marcella | ITV |
| 5 April | How Not to DIY | ITV |
| 5 April | Drive | ITV |
| 10 April | The Wine Show | ITV4 |
| 16 April | The Wine Show | ITV |
| 11 April | Chopping Block | ITV |
| 14 April | Bargain Shop Wars | ITV |
| 16 April | Bang on the Money | ITV |
| 19 April | Fierce | ITV |
| 25 April | Wild Australia with Ray Mears | ITV |
| 28 April | What Would Be Your Miracle? | ITV |
| 29 April | The Secret | ITV |
| 8 May | Peston on Sunday | ITV |
| 11 May | Killer Women with Piers Morgan | ITV |
| 30 May | Heathrow: Britain's Busiest Airport | ITV |
| 31 May | Myleene Klass: Single Mums on Benefits | ITV |
| 1 June | Secrets of... | ITV |
| 2 June | Fraud – How They Steal Your ID | ITV |
| 20 June | Judge Rinder's Crime Stories | ITV |
| 21 June | The Secret Life of a Bus Garage | ITV |
| 22 June | The Hand of God: 30 Years On | ITV4 |
| 24 June | Oscar Pistorius: The Interview | ITV |
| 28 June | Life Inside Jail: Hell on Earth | ITV |
| 29 June | Britain's Favourite Dogs | ITV |
| 4 July | Brief Encounters | ITV |
| 11 July | Wild France with Ray Mears | ITV |
| 14 July | The Investigator: A British Crime Story | ITV |
| 20 July | Elliott Wright: Playa in Marbella | ITVBe |
| 27 July | Wild Animal Reunions | ITV |
| 30 July | Tom Daley: Diving for Gold | ITV |
| 30 July | 1966 – A Nation Remembers | ITV |
| 1 August | Cash Trapped | ITV |
| 15 August | Alphabetical | ITV |
| 20 August | Spotless | ITV |
| 22 August | 500 Questions | ITV |
| 27 August | Go for It | ITV |
| 28 August | Victoria | ITV |
| 29 August | Celebrity Home Secrets | ITV |
| 30 August | Garden Nightmares | ITV |
| 31 August | Ängelby | ITV Encore |
| 2 September | Lady C and the Castle | ITV |
| 6 September | Fishing Impossible | ITV |
| 8 September | Inside Scotland Yard with Trevor McDonald | ITV |
| 9 September | Joanna Lumley's Japan | ITV |
| 20 September | Car Wars | ITV |
| 22 September | Paranoid | ITV |
| 30 September | The Level | ITV |
| 15 October | Meet the Parents | ITV |
| 16 October | Tutankhamun | ITV |
| 19 October | HIM | ITV |
| 31 October | Dark Angel | ITV |
| 2 November | This Time Next Year | ITV |
| 6 November | The Next Great Magician | ITV |
| 6 November | Prank Pad | ITV2 |
| 9 November | Dark Heart | ITV Encore |
| 14 November | Tenable | ITV |
| 30 November | How To Remember Everything | ITV |
| 7 December | In Plain Sight | ITV |
| 8 December | Extraordinary Weddings | ITV |

=== Channel 4 ===
| Date | Debut | Channel |
|---|---|---|
| 5 January | Tricks of the Restaurant Trade | Channel 4 |
| 11 January | How To Lose Weight Well | Channel 4 |
| 11 January | Crashing | Channel 4 |
| 11 January | All Hail The Veil | E4 |
| 23 January | The Girl Who Forgave the Nazis | Channel 4 |
| 26 January | Beatrix Potter with Patricia Routledge | More4 |
| 29 January | The Last Leg Goes Down Under | Channel 4 |
| 1 February | Supershoppers | Channel 4 |
| 2 February | The Secret Life of the Zoo | Channel 4 |
| 3 February | Discovering Britain | More4 |
| 4 February | Keeping Up with the Khans | Channel 4 |
| 6 February | Walking Through Time | Channel 4 |
| 8 February | Royal Navy School | Channel 4 |
| 22 February | A New Life in the Sun | Channel 4 |
| 25 February | Ugly House with George Clarke | Channel 4 |
| 7 March | Vet on the Hill | More4 |
| 8 March | The Aliens | E4 |
| 10 March | Live from Abbey Road Classics | Channel 4 |
| 21 March | The Food Chain | Channel 4 |
| 28 March | Guy Martin's Wall of Death: Live | Channel 4 |
| 6 April | The People Next Door | Channel 4 |
| 7 April | British Army Girls | Channel 4 |
| 8 April | Lookalikes | Channel 4 |
| 10 April | Hidden Britain by Drones | Channel 4 |
| 16 April | The Queen's Coronation: Behind Palace Doors | More4 |
| 16 April | How to Be Queen: 63 Years and Counting | More4 |
| 17 April | The Fearless Chef: Bolivia | Channel 4 |
| 19 April | The Tiny Tots Talent Agency | Channel 4 |
| 25 April | Flowers | Channel 4 |
| 25 April | Joe and Caspar Hit the Road | E4 |
| 1 May | Paul Merton's Secret Stations | Channel 4 |
| 4 May | Never Seen A Doctor | Channel 4 |
| 5 May | Grayson Perry: All Man | Channel 4 |
| 6 May | The Windsors | Channel 4 |
| 9 May | What Britain Buys | Channel 4 |
| 9 May | Eating Well with Hemsley + Hemsley | Channel 4 |
| 10 May | Sun, Sea and Supersavers | Channel 4 |
| 17 May | Locked Up | Channel 4 |
| 30 May | An Immigrant's Guide to Britain | Channel 4 |
| 5 June | Penelope Keith at Her Majesty's Secret Service | Channel 4 |
| 5 June | Escape to the Chateau | Channel 4 |
| 6 June | Meet What You Eat | Channel 4 |
| 6 June | Paul O'Grady's 100 Years of Movie Musicals | More4 |
| 8 June | Rescue Dog to Super Dog | Channel 4 |
| 8 June | Power Monkeys | Channel 4 |
| 9 June | Inside Birmingham Children's Hospital | Channel 4 |
| 26 June | Messages Home: Lost Films of the British Army | Channel 4 |
| 4 July | The Rich Kids of Instagram | E4 |
| 5 July | Life Stripped Bare | Channel 4 |
| 11 July | The Question Jury | Channel 4 |
| 12 July | The Job Interview | Channel 4 |
| 14 July | Inside Out Homes | Channel 4 |
| 18 July | Eden | Channel 4 |
| 25 July | Naked Attraction | Channel 4 |
| 26 July | Wasted | E4 |
| 3 August | A Granny's Guide to the Modern World | Channel 4 |
| 9 August | Phil Spencer's Stately Homes | More4 |
| 22 August | Make My Body Better with Davina McCall | Channel 4 |
| 29 August | Celebs Go Dating | E4 |
| 29 August | Joe Wicks: The Body Coach | Channel 4 |
| 3 September | Formula One meets... (Note – its presenter's name but has working title of F1 Meets) | Channel 4 |
| 5 September | Stage School | E4 |
| 13 September | Body Fixers | E4 |
| 15 September | My Floating Home | More4 |
| 18 September | Celebrity Island with Bear Gyrlls | Channel 4 |
| 20 September | National Treasure | Channel 4 |
| 23 September | Jamie's Family Super Foods | Channel 4 |
| 23 September | The Lie Detective | Channel 4 |
| 27 September | Damned | Channel 4 |
| 28 September | World of Weird | Channel 4 |
| 17 October | Hoarder SOS | Channel 4 |
| 18 October | Your Face Says It All | Channel 4 |
| 19 October | Crazyhead | E4 |
| 24 October | Be Your Own Doctor | Channel 4 |
| 16 November | Kids on the Edge | Channel 4 |
| 19 November | Britain at Low Tide | Channel 4 |
| 21 November | Our Guy in China | Channel 4 |
| 22 November | Breaking The Silence: Live | Channel 4 |
| 22 November | What Britain Earns with Mary Portas | Channel 4 |
| 22 November | One Killer Punch | Channel 4 |
| 26 November | Lee meets... | Channel 4 |
| 29 November | Life on the Psych Ward | Channel 4 |
| 2 December | Alan Carr's Happy Hour | Channel 4 |
| 12 December | Carjackers | E4 |
| 19 December | Alan Carr's 12 Stars of Christmas | Channel 4 |
| 24 December | We're Going on a Bear Hunt | Channel 4 |

=== Channel 5 ===
| Date | Debut | Channel |
|---|---|---|
| 4 January | 14 Years on Death Row | Channel 5 |
| 5 January | Bargain-Loving Brits in the Sun | Channel 5 |
| 7 January | Celebrity Botched Up Bodies | Channel 5 |
| 7 January | Britain's Bloody Crown | Channel 5 |
| 8 January | Lip Sync Battle UK | Channel 5 |
| 9 January | Battlefield Recovery | Channel 5 |
| 9 January | Chasing Monsters | Channel 5 |
| 12 January | The Secret Life of the Family | Channel 5 |
| 15 January | That's So... | Channel 5 |
| 1 February | America's Hidden Pyramid City | Channel 5 |
| 9 February | The Great British Benefits Handout | Channel 5 |
| 10 February | Violent Child, Desperate Parents | Channel 5 |
| 11 February | Flood Chaos: Winter Road Rescue | Channel 5 |
| 15 February | Weather Terror: Brits in Peril | Channel 5 |
| 10 March | Britain's Worst Crimes | Channel 5 |
| 11 March | Kitten Impossible | Channel 5 |
| 21 March | The Tube: Going Underground | Channel 5 |
| 24 March | Medical Mysteries | Channel 5 |
| 8 April | Cleopatra: Mother, Mistress, Murderer, Queen | Channel 5 |
| 8 April | Secrets of the Egyptian Pyramids | Channel 5 |
| 12 April | Inside the World's Toughest Prisons | Channel 5 |
| 15 April | Henry VIII and his Six Wives | Channel 5 |
| 15 April | Elizabeth II: 90 Glorious Years | Channel 5 |
| 15 April | Secrets of the Palace Pets | Channel 5 |
| 19 April | Tribal Teens... Here Comes Trouble | Channel 5 |
| 22 April | Ben Fogle: The Great African Migration | Channel 5 |
| 28 April | The Secret Life of Puppies and Kittens | Channel 5 |
| 9 May | Up Late with Rylan | Channel 5 |
| 10 May | Penguin A&E with Lorraine Kelly | Channel 5 |
| 11 May | Sex Pod | Channel 5 |
| 27 May | Kitten's Got Talent | Channel 5 |
| 27 May | The Ant & Dec Story | Channel 5 |
| 3 June | Inside the Mega Twister | Channel 5 |
| 3 June | Karen Carpenter: Goodbye to Love | Channel 5 |
| 3 June | The Carpenters: Their Greatest Hits | Channel 5 |
| 23 June | It's Not Me, It's You | Channel 5 |
| 4 July | The Blair Rich Project | Channel 5 |
| 2 August | Borderline | Channel 5 |
| 8 August | Mascara Boys: Sex Me Up | Channel 5 |
| 11 August | 30 Stone But Can't Stop Eating | Channel 5 |
| 20 September | Gypsy Kids: Our Secret World | Channel 5 |
| 2 September | The Cars that Made Britain Great | Channel 5 |
| 2 September | Carry On Caravanning | Channel 5 |
| 7 September | Undercover: Nailing the Fraudsters | Channel 5 |
| 3 October | Raw Recruits: Squaddies at 16 | Channel 5 |
| 11 October | The Boy with No Brain: Extraordinary People | Channel 5 |
| 14 October | Britain's Greatest Bridges | Channel 5 |
| 28 November | MPs: Behind Closed Doors | Channel 5 |
| 28 November | Tour de Celeb | Channel 5 |

=== Other channels ===
| Date | Debut | Channel |
|---|---|---|
| 6 January | 100 Code | Sky Atlantic |
| 11 January | My Kitchen Rules New Zealand | Sky Living |
| 15 January | Tinkershrimp & Dutch | Nicktoons |
| 22 January | Stan Lee's Lucky Man | Sky 1 |
| 28 January | The Nightmare Worlds of H. G. Wells | Sky Arts |
| 6 February | Nick Kicks | Nickelodeon |
| 15 February | ON | W |
| 15 February | Get Me to the Church | W |
| 28 February | Dogs Might Fly | Sky 1 |
| 4 April | Battlechefs | W |
| 12 April | Micky Flanagan's Detour De France | Sky 1 |
| 12 April | Camping | Sky Atlantic |
| 15 April | The Five | Sky 1 |
| 21 April | Shakespeare: The Legacy with John Nettles | Yesterday |
| 30 April | Attenborough at 90: Behind the Lens | Sky 1 |
| 12 May | Counterfeit Cat | Disney Channel |
| 24 May | Rovers | Sky 1 |
| 26 May | Neil Gaiman's Likely Stories | Sky Arts |
| 4 July | Digby Dragon | Nick Jr. |
| 20 July | The Rebel | Gold |
| 21 July | Masters of Photography | Sky Arts |
| 12 August | Say Yes to the Dress: UK | TLC |
| 1 September | John Bishop: In Conversation With... | W |
| 2 September | The Collection | Amazon Video |
| 5 September | Dara O Briain's Go 8 Bit | Dave |
| 14 September | Unspun with Matt Forde | Dave |
| 16 September | Hooten & the Lady | Sky 1 |
| 23 September | The Lodge | Disney Channel |
| 3 October | I've Got Something to Tell You | W |
| 13 October | Zapped | Dave |
| 16 October | Harry Hill's Tea Time | Sky 1 |
| 19 October | Russell Howard & Mum: USA Road Trip | Comedy Central |
| 2 November | Teen Mom UK | MTV |
| 4 November | The Crown | Netflix |
| 18 November | The Grand Tour | Amazon Video |
| 30 November | We Have Been Watching | Gold |
| 25 December | The Last Dragonslayer | Sky 1 |
| 30 December | Delicious | Sky 1 |

== Channels and streaming services ==
=== New channels ===
| Date | Channel |
|---|---|
| 22 March | True Crime |
| 22 March | True Crime +1 |
| 5 July | Nick Jr. HD |
| 10 August | My5 |
| 24 August | Sky Sports Mix |
| 19 September | Viceland |
| 20 September | Blaze |
| 20 September | Blaze +1 |

=== New streaming services ===
| Date | Channel |
|---|---|
| 16 February | BBC Three Online |

=== Defunct channels ===
| Date | Channel |
|---|---|
| 16 February | BBC Three |
| 16 February | BBC Three HD |
| 10 August | Channel 5 +24 |

=== Rebranding channels ===
| Date | Old Name | New Name |
|---|---|---|
| 12 January | Sony Entertainment Television | Sony Channel |
| 11 February | 5* | 5Star |
| 15 February | Watch | W |
| 8 July | Sky Movies | Sky Cinema |
| 14 July | Tiny Pop +1 | Pop Max |
| 4 August | BT Sport Europe | BT Sport 3 |
| 10 August | Channel 5 +24 | My5 |
| 1 December | Pop Max | Tiny Pop +1 |

== Television shows ==
=== Changes of network affiliation ===
| Show | Moved from | Moved to |
|---|---|---|
| Don't Tell the Bride | BBC One/BBC Three | Sky 1 |
| Formula 1 (terrestrial rights) | BBC One/BBC Two/BBC Three | Channel 4/More 4 |
| Ripper Street | BBC One/Amazon Video | BBC Two/Amazon Video |
| EastEnders (late night repeats) | BBC Three | W |
| Family Guy (first run rights) | BBC Three | ITV2 |
| American Dad! | BBC Three | ITV2 |
| Josh | BBC Three | BBC One (BBC Three Online) |
| Stacey Dooley Investigates | BBC Three | BBC One (BBC Three Online) |
| Olympic Games (extra coverage) | BBC Three | BBC Four |
| Impractical Jokers UK | BBC Three | Channel 5 / Comedy Central |
| Robot Wars | Channel 5 Challenge; Bravo; Dave | BBC Two |
| Coach Trip | Channel 4 & More4 | E4 |
| Agents of S.H.I.E.L.D. | Channel 4 & More4 | E4 |
| Britain and Ireland's Next Top Model | Sky Living | Lifetime |
| Nashville | E4 | Sky Living |
| 8 Out of 10 Cats | Channel 4 | More4 |
| Traffic Cops | BBC One/BBC Three | Channel 5 |
| Black Mirror | Channel 4 | Netflix |
| Lovesick | Channel 4 | Netflix |

=== Returning this year after a break of one year or longer ===
| Programme | Date(s) of original removal | Original channel(s) | Date of return | New channel(s) |
|---|---|---|---|---|
| The Big Quiz | 2012 | ITV | 1 January 2016 | N/A (same channel) |
| Britain and Ireland's Next Top Model | 2013 | Sky Living | 14 January 2016 | Lifetime |
| Pocoyo | 2013 | CITV; Nick Jr. | 28 October 2016 | YouTube |
| Mid Morning Matters with Alan Partridge | 2012 | Sky Atlantic | 8 February 2016 | N/A (same channel) |
| Some Mothers Do 'Ave 'Em | 25 December 1978 | BBC One | 18 March 2016 | N/A (same channel) |
| Maigret | 1963; 1993 | ITV | 28 March 2016 | N/A (same channel) |
| Copycats | 2012 | CBBC | 29 April 2016 | N/A (same channel) |
| Robot Wars | 28 March 2004 | BBC One; BBC Two; BBC Choice; Channel 5 | 24 July 2016 | BBC Two |
| Animal Park | 2011 | BBC One; BBC Two | 22 August 2016 | BBC One |
| Are You Being Served? | 1985 | BBC One | 28 August 2016 | N/A (same channel) |
| Porridge | 1977 | BBC One | 28 August 2016 | N/A (same channel) |
| Goodnight Sweetheart | 28 June 1999 | BBC One | 2 September 2016 | N/A (same channel) |
| Cold Feet | 16 March 2003 | ITV | 5 September 2016 | N/A (same channel) |
| House Doctor | 6 November 2003 | Channel 5 | 3 October 2016 | N/A (same channel) |
| Still Game | 31 December 2007 (Scotland); 2 January 2008 (UK) | BBC One Scotland; BBC Two | 7 October 2016 | BBC One |
| Tipping Point: Lucky Stars | 23 August 2014 | ITV | 15 October 2016 | N/A (same channel) |
| The Crystal Maze | 10 August 1995 | Channel 4 | 16 October 2016 | N/A (same channel) |
| Black Mirror | 25 February 2013; 16 December 2014 | Channel 4 | 21 October 2016 | Netflix |
| Lovesick | 6 November 2014 | Channel 4 | 17 November 2016 | Netflix |
| Blankety Blank | 28 December 1999; 10 August 2002 | BBC One; ITV | 24 December 2016 | ITV |
| Outnumbered | 5 March 2014 | BBC One | 26 December 2016 | N/A (same channel) |
| Jonathan Creek | 28 February 2004; 14 March 2014 | BBC One | 28 December 2016 | N/A (same channel) |

== Continuing television shows ==
=== 1920s ===
| Programme | Date |
|---|---|
| BBC Wimbledon | (1927–1939, 1946–2019, 2021–present) |

=== 1930s ===
| Programme | Date |
|---|---|
| Trooping the Colour | 1937–1939, 1946–2019, 2023–present |
| The Boat Race | (1938–1939, 1946–2019, 2021–present) |

=== 1950s ===
| Programme | Date |
|---|---|
| Panorama | (1953–present) |
| The Sky at Night | (1957–present) |
| Final Score | (1958–present) (part of Grandstand 1958–2001) |
| Blue Peter | (1958–present) |

=== 1960s ===
| Programme | Date |
|---|---|
| Coronation Street | (1960–present) |
| Maigret | (1960–1963, 1992–1993, 2016–present) |
| Points of View | (1961–present) |
| Songs of Praise | (1961–present) |
| University Challenge | (1962–1987, 1994–present) |
| Doctor Who | (1963–1989, 1996, 2005–present) |
| Horizon | (1964–present) |
| Match of the Day | (1964–present) |
| Top of the Pops | (1964–present) (only at Christmas 2006–present) |
| Gardeners' World | (1968–present) |
| A Question of Sport | (1968, 1970–present) |

=== 1970s ===
| Programme | Date |
|---|---|
| Emmerdale | (1972–present) |
| Mastermind (including Celebrity Mastermind) | (1972–1997, 2003–present) |
| Newsround | (1972–present) |
| Are You Being Served? | (1972–1985, 2016) |
| Some Mothers Do 'Ave 'Em | (1973–1978, 2016) |
| Football Focus | (1974–present) |
| Porridge | (1974–1977, 2016–present) |
| Arena | (1975–present) |
| One Man and His Dog | (1976–present) |
| Top Gear | (1977–2001, 2002–present) |
| Ski Sunday | (1978–present) |
| Antiques Roadshow | (1979–present) |
| Question Time | (1979–present) |

=== 1980s ===
| Programme | Date |
|---|---|
| Children in Need | (1980–present) |
| Danger Mouse | (1981–1992, 2015–present) |
| Countdown | (1982–present) |
| ITV Breakfast | (1983–present) |
| Good Morning Britain | (1983–1992, 2014–present) |
| Channel 4 Racing | (1984–2016) |
| Thomas & Friends | (1984–present) |
| EastEnders | (1985–present) |
| Watchdog | (1985–present) |
| Comic Relief | (1985–present) |
| Catchphrase | (1986–2002, 2013–present) |
| Casualty | (1986–present) |
| Fifteen to One | (1988–2003, 2013–present) |
| Red Dwarf | (1988–1999, 2009, 2012–present) |
| This Morning | (1988–present) |
| Countryfile | (1988–present) |

=== 1990s ===
| Programme | Date |
|---|---|
| The Crystal Maze | (1990–1995, 2016–present) |
| Have I Got News for You | (1990–present) |
| MasterChef | (1990–2001, 2005–present) |
| ITV News Meridian | (1993–present) |
| Goodnight Sweetheart | (1993–1999, 2016) |
| Junior MasterChef | (1994–1999, 2010–present) |
| Room 101 | (1994–2007, 2012–present) |
| The National Lottery Draws | (1994–2017) |
| Top of the Pops 2 | (1994–present) |
| Hollyoaks | (1995–present) |
| Soccer AM | (1995–present) |
| Silent Witness | (1996–present) |
| Midsomer Murders | (1997–present) |
| Jonathan Creek | (1997–2004, 2009–2014, 2016–present) |
| Robot Wars | (1997–2004, 2016–present) |
| Teletubbies | (1997–2001, 2002, 2007–2009, 2012, 2015–present) |
| Y Clwb Rygbi | (1997–present) |
| Cold Feet | (1998–2003, 2016–present) |
| British Soap Awards | (1999–2019, 2022–present) |
| Holby City | (1999–2022) |
| Loose Women | (1999–present) |

=== 2000s ===
| Programme | Date |
2000
| Big Brother (including Celebrity Big Brother) | (2000–present) |
| Bargain Hunt | (2000–present) |
| BBC Breakfast | (2000–present) |
| Click | (2000–present) |
| Doctors | (2000–present) |
| A Place in the Sun | (2000–present) |
| The Unforgettable | (2000–2002, 2010–present) |
| Unreported World | (2000–present) |
2001
| BBC South East Today | (2001–present) |
| Rogue Traders | (2001–present) (part of Watchdog 2009–present) |
2002
| Escape to the Country | (2002–present) |
| Fifth Gear | (2002–2016) |
| Flog It! | (2002–present) |
| I'm a Celebrity...Get Me Out of Here! | (2002–present) |
| In It to Win It | (2002–2016) |
| Inside Out | (2002–present) |
| Most Haunted | (2002–2010, 2014–present) |
| River City | (2002–2026) |
| Still Game | (2002–2007, 2016) |
| Saturday Kitchen | (2002–present) |
2003
| Daily Politics | (2003–present) |
| QI | (2003–present) |
| This Week | (2003–present) |
| Eggheads | (2003–present) |
| Extraordinary People | (2003–present) |
| Grumpy Old Men | (2003–present) |
| Homes Under the Hammer | (2003–present) |
| Traffic Cops | (2003–present) |
2004
| Doc Martin | (2004–2019) |
| Match of the Day 2 | (2004–present) |
| Strictly Come Dancing | (2004–present) |
| The X Factor | (2004–2018, 2021–present) |
| The Big Fat Quiz of the Year | (2004–present) |
| The Culture Show | (2004–present) |
| Football First | (2004–present) |
| The Gadget Show | (2004–present) |
| Live at the Apollo | (2004–present) |
| NewsWatch | (2004–present) |
| SadlerVision | (2004–present) |
| Strictly Come Dancing: It Takes Two | (2004–present) |
| Who Do You Think You Are? | (2004–present) |
2005
| 8 out of 10 Cats | (2005–present) |
| Coach Trip | (2005–2006, 2009–2012, 2013–present) |
| Deal or No Deal | (2005–2016) |
| The Andrew Marr Show | (2005–present) |
| The Adventure Show | (2005–present) |
| The Apprentice | (2005–present) |
| Dragons' Den | (2005–present) |
| The Hotel Inspector | (2005–present) |
| The Jeremy Kyle Show | (2005–present) |
| Mock the Week | (2005–present) |
| Pocoyo | (2005–present) |
| Springwatch | (2005–present) |
2006
| The Album Chart Show | (2006–present) |
| Animal Spies! | (2006–present) |
| The Apprentice: You're Fired! | (2006–present) |
| Banged Up Abroad | (2006–present) |
| Cricket AM | (2006–present) |
| Dickinson's Real Deal | (2006–present) |
| Don't Get Done, Get Dom | (2006–present) |
| Horrid Henry | (2006–present) |
| Monkey Life | (2006–present) |
| Not Going Out | (2006–present) |
| The One Show | (2006–present) |
| People & Power | (2006–present) |
| Peschardt's People | (2006–present) |
| The Secret Millionaire | (2006–2008, 2010–present) |
2007
| Britain's Got Talent | (2007–present) |
| Would I Lie to You? | (2007–present) |
| Benidorm | (2007–present) |
| Outnumbered | (2007–2014, 2016–present) |
| The Big Questions | (2007–present) |
| Don't Tell the Bride | (2007–present) |
| The Graham Norton Show | (2007–present) |
| Heir Hunters | (2007–present) |
| Helicopter Heroes | (2007–present) |
| Inspector George Gently | (2007–2017) |
| London Ink | (2007–present) |
| Shaun the Sheep | (2007–present) |
| Real Rescues | (2007–present) |
| The Hot Desk | (2007–present) |
2008
| An Là | (2008–present) |
| Big & Small | (2008–present) |
| Celebrity Juice | (2008–present) |
| Chuggington | (2008–present) |
| Only Connect | (2008–present) |
| Put Your Money Where Your Mouth Is | (2008–present) |
| Police Interceptors | (2008–present) |
| Rubbernecker | (2008–present) |
| Seachd Là | (2008–present) |
| Wallander | (2008–2016) |
2009
| Pointless | (2009–present) |
| The Chase | (2009–present) |
| Alan Carr: Chatty Man | (2009–2016) |
| Countrywise | (2009–present) |
| Cowboy Trap | (2009–present) |
| Four Weddings | (2009–present) |
| Piers Morgan's Life Stories | (2009–present) |
| Rip Off Britain | (2009–present) |

=== 2010s ===
| Programme | Date |
2010
| DCI Banks | (2010–2016) |
| Dinner Date | (2010–present) |
| The Great British Bake Off | (2010–present) |
| Great British Railway Journeys | (2010–present) |
| A League of Their Own | (2010–present) |
| Little Crackers | (2010–present) |
| Lorraine | (2010–present) |
| Luther | (2010–present) |
| The Only Way Is Essex | (2010–present) |
| Sherlock | (2010–present) |
| Sunday Morning Live | (2010–present) |
| Take Me Out | (2010–2020) |
2011
| All Over the Place | (2011–present) |
| The Amazing World of Gumball | (2011–present) |
| Black Mirror | (2011–present) |
| Episodes | (2011–2017) |
| Four Rooms | (2011–present) |
| Fresh Meat | (2011–2016) |
| Hacker Time | (2011–2016) |
| Horrible Histories: Gory Games | (2011–2018) |
| Junior Bake Off | (2011–present) |
| Made in Chelsea | (2011–present) |
| Match of the Day Kickabout | (2011–present) |
| Ross Kemp: Extreme World | (2011–2017) |
| Sam & Mark's Big Friday Wind-Up | (2011–present) |
| Scott & Bailey | (2011–2016) |
| Show Me What You're Made Of | (2011–present) |
| Sun, Sex and Suspicious Parents | (2011–present) |
| Trollied | (2011–present) |
| Vera | (2011–2025) |
2012
| 4 O'Clock Club | (2012–present) |
| Endeavour | (2012–present) |
| Call the Midwife | (2012–present) |
| Great Continental Railway Journeys | (2012–present) |
| Prisoners' Wives | (2012–present) |
| The Syndicate | (2012–present) |
| Stella | (2012–present) |
| Stand Up To Cancer | (2012–present) |
| The Voice UK | (2012–present) |
| Naomi's Nightmares of Nature | (2012–present) |
| Tipping Point | (2012–present) |
| Paul O'Grady: For the Love of Dogs | (2012–2023) |
| Last Tango in Halifax | (2012–present) |
| Operation Ouch! | (2012–present) |
| Claimed and Shamed | (2012–present) |
| Wolfblood | (2012–present) |
2013
| The Dumping Ground | (2013–present) |
| Mr Selfridge | (2013–2016) |
| Blandings | (2013–present) |
| Dani's Castle | (2013–present) |
| Absolute Genius with Dick and Dom | (2013–present) |
| Broadchurch | (2013–2017) |
| Caught Red Handed | (2013–present) |
| Officially Amazing | (2013–present) |
| Shetland | (2013–present) |
| Vicious | (2013–2016) |
| The Great British Sewing Bee | (2013–2016) |
| Count Arthur Strong | (2013–2017) |
| The Fall | (2013–2016) |
| Big Star's Little Star | (2013–2018) |
| The Dog Rescuers | (2013–present) |
| Still Open All Hours | (2013–present) |
| Two Doors Down | (2013, 2016–present) |
| Yonderland | (2013–2016) |
2014
| Agatha Raisin | (2014–present) |
| Boomers | (2014–present) |
| The Dog Ate My Homework | (2014–present) |
| The Jump | (2014–present) |
| The Musketeers | (2014–2016) |
| Detectorists | (2014–2017) |
| The Great Interior Design Challenge | (2014–present) |
| Hank Zipzer | (2014–2016) |
| The Great British Bake Off: An Extra Slice | (2014–present) |
| Good Morning Britain | (2014–present) |
| Happy Valley | (2014–present) |
| Collage and Service: Meets G & G1 | (2014–present) |
| Holiday of My Lifetime | (2014, 2016–present) |
| Tyger Takes On... | (2014–present) |
| Educating Joey Essex | (2014–present) |
| In the Club | (2014–present) |
| James May's Cars of the People | (2014–2016) |
| Weekend | (2014–2017) |
| Chasing Shadows | (2014–present) |
| Judge Rinder | (2014–present) |
| Grantchester | (2014–present) |
| Paul O'Grady's Animal Orphans | (2014–present) |
| Weekend Escapes with Warwick Davis | (2014–present) |
| Scrambled! | (2014–present) |
| The Big Allotment Challenge | (2014–present) |
| W1A | (2014–2017) |
| Who's Doing the Dishes? | (2014–present) |
| 24 Hours in Police Custody | (2014–present) |
| GPs: Behind Closed Doors | (2014–present) |
2015
| The Almost Impossible Gameshow | (2015–present) |
| Boy Meets Girl | (2015–2016) |
| Bear Grylls: Mission Survive | (2015–2016) |
| Bring the Noise | (2015–2016) |
| CBBC Official Chart Show | (2015–2017) |
| Chewing Gum | (2015–2017) |
| The Coroner | (2015–2016) |
| Cradle to Grave | (2015–present) |
| Decimate | (2015–present) |
| The Dengineers | (2015–present) |
| Dickensian | (2015–2016) |
| Doctor Foster | (2015–present) |
| Eve | (2015–present) |
| The Frankenstein Chronicles | (2015–present) |
| The Great Pottery Throw Down | (2015–present) |
| Hetty Feather | (2015–present) |
| Hive Minds | (2015–present) |
| Hoff the Record | (2015–present) |
| Home Fires | (2015–2016) |
| Hunted | (2015–present) |
| In Therapy | (2015–present) |
| Indian Summers | (2015–2016) |
| The John Bishop Show | (2015–present) |
| Josh | (2015–2017) |
| Jeremy Kyle's Emergency Room | (2015–present) |
| The Keith Lemon Sketch Show | (2015–2016) |
| The Kyle Files | (2015–present) |
| The Met: Policing London | (2015–present) |
| Michael McIntyre's Big Show | (2015–present) |
| Ninja Warrior UK | (2015–present) |
| Nightmare Tenants, Slum Landlords | (2015–present) |
| No Offence | (2015–present) |
| Ordinary Lies | (2015–2016) |
| Peter Kay's Car Share | (2015–2017) |
| Play to the Whistle | (2015–2017) |
| Poldark | (2015–present) |
| Real Stories with Ranvir Singh | (2015–present) |
| Rebound | (2015–present) |
| Safe House | (2015–present) |
| SAS: Who Dares Wins | (2015–present) |
| The Saturday Show | (2015–present) |
| Scream Street | (2015–present) |
| Simply Nigella | (2015–present) |
| So Awkward | (2015–present) |
| Special Forces: Ultimate Hell Week | (2015–present) |
| Taskmaster | (2015–present) |
| Thunderbirds Are Go | (2015–present) |
| Victoria Derbyshire | (2015–present) |
| Wild & Weird | (2015–present) |
| 1000 Heartbeats | (2015–2016) |
| 10,000 BC | (2015–present) |
| Eat Well for Less? | (2015–present) |

== Ending this year ==
| Date(s) | Programme | Channel(s) | Debut(s) |
|---|---|---|---|
| 13 January | Great Barrier Reef | BBC One | 2015 |
| 14 January | World's Sneakiest Animals | BBC Two | 2015 |
| 15 January | 1000 Heartbeats | ITV | 2015 |
| 15 January | Bring the Noise | Sky 1 | 2015 |
| 24 January | Walking the Himalayas | Channel 4 | 2015 |
| 30 January | The Life of Rock with Brian Pern | BBC Four | 2014 |
| 4 February | The Nightmare Worlds of H. G. Wells | Sky Arts | 2016 |
| 5 February | The Dumping Ground: I'm... | CBBC | 2016 |
| 7 February | James May's Cars of the People | BBC Two | 2014 |
| 7 February | War & Peace | BBC One | 2016 |
| 12 February | Tinkershrimp & Dutch | Nicktoons | 2016 |
| 14 February | Deutschland 83 | Channel 4 | 2015 |
| 15 February | Crashing | Channel 4 | 2016 |
| 16 February | 60 Seconds | BBC Choice & BBC Three | 2001 |
| 21 February | Dickensian | BBC One | 2015 |
| 25 February | Keeping Up with the Khans | Channel 4 | 2016 |
| 25 February | The Story of China | BBC Two | 2016 |
| 25 February | Jericho | ITV | 2016 |
| 2 March | One Child | BBC Two | 2016 |
| 7 March | The Renaissance Unchained | BBC Four | 2016 |
| 10 March | The Keith Lemon Sketch Show | ITV2 | 2015 |
| 11 March | Mr Selfridge | ITV | 2013 |
| 12 March | Stag | BBC Two | 2016 |
| 13 March | Let's Play Darts for Sport Relief | BBC Two | 2015 |
| 20 March | Beowulf: Return to the Shieldlands | ITV | 2016 |
| 20 March | Doctor Thorne | ITV | 2016 |
| 27 March | Thirteen | BBC Three | 2016 |
| 27 March | The Night Manager | BBC One | 2016 |
| 28 March | Fresh Meat | Channel 4 | 2011 |
| 29 March | The Beginning and End of the Universe | BBC Four | 2016 |
| 1 April | Too Much TV | BBC Two | 2016 |
| 3 April | Tribes, Predators & Me | BBC Two | 2016 |
| 7 April | Stewart Lee's Comedy Vehicle | BBC Two | 2009 |
| 7 April | Bear Grylls: Mission Survive | ITV | 2015 |
| 9 April | You're Back in the Room | ITV | 2015 |
| 12 April | The Aliens | E4 | 2016 |
| 17 April | Life in the Air | BBC One | 2016 |
| 26 April | Camping | Sky Atlantic | 2016 |
| 27 April | Scott & Bailey | ITV | 2011 |
| 2 May | Tree Fu Tom | CBeebies | 2012 |
| 3 May | Drive | ITV | 2016 |
| 6 May | Henry VIII and his Six Wives | Channel 5 | 2016 |
| 7 May | Saturday Night Football | Sky Sports | 2013 |
| 7 May | Win Your Wish List | BBC One | 2014 |
| 8 May | Home Fires | ITV | 2015 |
| 12 May | Houdini & Doyle | ITV Encore | 2016 |
| 15 May | Indian Summers | Channel 4 | 2015 |
| 15 May | Undercover | BBC One | 2016 |
| 15 May | The Silk Road | BBC Four | 2016 |
| 19 May | Grayson Perry: All Man | Channel 4 | 2016 |
| 20 May | The Secret | ITV | 2016 |
| 24 May | Fifth Gear | Channel 5, Discovery Channel, History & ITV4 | 2002 |
| 25 May | Nature's Epic Journeys | BBC One | 2016 |
| 4 June | Bang on the Money | ITV | 2016 |
| 4 June | You Saw Them Here First | ITV | 2014 |
| 5 June | Wallander | BBC One | 2008 |
| 6 June | Wild Australia with Ray Mears | ITV | 2016 |
| 6 June | Up Late with Rylan | Channel 5 | 2016 |
| 11 June | Videogame Nation | Challenge | 2014 |
| 17 June | Love, Nina | BBC One | 2016 |
| 19 June | Penny Dreadful | Sky Atlantic | 2014 |
| 19 June | Stupid Man, Smart Phone | BBC Three & BBC Two | 2016 |
| 26 June | For What It's Worth | BBC One | 2016 |
| 4 July | The Great British Sewing Bee | BBC Two | 2013 |
| 6 July | Power Monkeys | Channel 4 | 2016 |
| 13 July | Trainspotting Live | BBC Four | 2016 |
| 16 July | The National Lottery: In It to Win It | BBC One | 2002 |
| 21 July | New Blood | BBC One | 2016 |
| 25 July | Forces of Nature | BBC One | 2016 |
| 25 July | Unsolved: The Boy Who Disappeared | BBC Three | 2016 |
| 28 July | The Refugee Camp: Our Desert Home | BBC Two | 2016 |
| 29 July | The Hairy Builder | BBC Two | 2016 |
| 31 July | The Secret Agent | BBC One | 2016 |
| 1 August | The Musketeers | BBC One | 2014 |
| 2 August | The Living and the Dead | BBC One | 2016 |
| 4 August | Boy Meets Girl | BBC Two | 2015 |
| 4 August | Inside Out Homes | Channel 4 | 2016 |
| 8 August | Brief Encounters | ITV | 2016 |
| 17 August | A Granny's Guide to the Modern World | Channel 4 | 2016 |
| 19 August | It's Not Me, It's You | Channel 5 | 2016 |
| 19 August | Hacker Time | CBBC | 2011 |
| 22 August | Hacker's Olympic Rundown | CBBC | 2016 |
| 23 August | Wasted | E4 | 2016 |
| 29 August | BBC Four Goes Slow | BBC Four | 2015 |
| 31 August | Suspects | Channel 5 | 2014 |
| 3 September | The Getaway Car | BBC One | 2016 |
| 13 September | One of Us | BBC One | 2016 |
| 15 September | Absolute Fashion: Inside British Vogue | BBC Two | 2016 |
| 15 September | Gypsy Kids: Our Secret World | Channel 5 | 2016 |
| 17 September | All Together Now: The Great Orchestra Challenge | BBC Four, BBC Two | 2016 |
| 22 September | Ingenious Animals | BBC One | 2016 |
| 23 September | Make Me an Egghead | BBC Two | 2016 |
| 23 September | Joanna Lumley's Japan | ITV | 2016 |
| 5 October | DCI Banks | ITV | 2010 |
| 8 October | Can't Touch This | BBC One | 2016 |
| 11 October | National Treasure | Channel 4 | 2016 |
| 15 October | 5 Star Family Reunion | BBC One | 2015 |
| 28 October | The Fall | BBC Two | 2013 |
| 2 November | HIM | ITV | 2016 |
| 4 November | The Moonstone | BBC One | 2016 |
| 4 November | Hooten & the Lady | Sky 1 | 2016 |
| 6 November | Tutankhamun | ITV | 2016 |
| Mickey Mouse Clubhouse | Disney Junior | ITV | 2016 |
| 7 November | Disney Junior | Dark Angel | 2016 |
| 7 November | I've Got Something To Tell You | W | 2016 |
| 10 November | Paranoid | ITV | |
| 11 November | Rebound | ITV | 2015 |
| 23 November | Crazyhead | E4 | 2016 |
| 2 December | The Coroner | BBC One | 2015 |
| 3 December | Class | BBC Three | |
| 3 December | Meet the Parents | ITV | 2016 |
| 10 December | Go for It! | ITV | 2016 |
| 11 December | The Next Great Magician | ITV | 2016 |
| 11 December | The Xtra Factor | ITV2 | 2004 |
| 11 December | Planet Earth II | BBC One | 2016 |
| 12 December | Hank Zipzer | CBBC | 2014 |
| 13 December | Rillington Place | BBC One | 2016 |
| 13 December | Muslims Like Us | BBC Two | 2016 |
| 16 December | Think Tank | BBC One | 2016 |
| 16 December | Alan Carr's Happy Hour | Channel 4 | 2016 |
| 16 December | Vicious | ITV | 2013 |
| 18 December | Airmageddon | CBBC | 2016 |
| 21 December | In Plain Sight | ITV | 2016 |
| 21 December | Six Wives with Lucy Worsley | BBC One | 2016 |
| 21 December | The Big Life Fix with Simon Reeve | BBC Two | 2016 |
| 22 December | Close to the Enemy | BBC Two | 2016 |
| 23 December | Deal or No Deal | Channel 4 | 2005 |
| 23 December | Citizen Khan | BBC One | 2012 |
| 24 December | Yonderland | Sky 1 | 2013 |
| 25 December | Alan Carr: Chatty Man | Channel 4 | 2009 |
| 27 December | Revolting Rhymes | BBC One | 2016 |
| 27 December | The Witness for the Prosecution | BBC One | 2016 |
| 27 December | Channel 4 Racing | Channel 4 | 1984 |

== Deaths ==
| Date | Name | Age | Broadcast credibility |
|---|---|---|---|
| 2 January | Leonard White | 99 | Television producer and actor |
| 9 January | Ed Stewart | 74 | British TV and radio broadcaster (Top of the Pops, Crackerjack) |
| 13 January | Brian Bedford | 80 | Actor (Robin Hood, Nixon, Much Ado About Nothing) |
| 13 January | Conrad Phillips | 90 | Actor (The Adventures of William Tell) |
| 14 January | Alan Rickman | 69 | Actor (Harry Potter, Die Hard, Love Actually, Robin Hood: Prince of Thieves, Truly, Madly, Deeply) |
| 14 January | Robert Banks Stewart | 84 | Writer and producer (Bergerac, Doctor Who, The Darling Buds of May) |
| 19 January | Sheila Sim, Lady Attenborough | 93 | Actress (A Canterbury Tale, Pandora and the Flying Dutchman, West of Zanzibar) and widow of Richard Attenborough |
| 26 January | Charlie Courtauld | 49 | Television producer and journalist (Question Time) |
| 30 January | Frank Finlay | 89 | Actor (Othello, The Pianist, The Three Musketeers) |
| 31 January | Sir Terry Wogan | 77 | Broadcaster, narrator and presenter (Auntie's Bloomers, Blankety Blank, Children in Need, Wogan, Eurovision Song Contest, Stoppit and Tidyup, Wogan's Perfect Recall) |
| 14 February | Drewe Henley | 75 | Actor (Star Wars Episode IV: A New Hope) |
| 20 February | Jon Rollason | 84 | Actor (The Avengers, Coronation Street, Doctor Who, Softly, Softly, Z-Cars) |
| 22 February | Douglas Slocombe | 103 | Cinematographer (Indiana Jones, The Lion in Winter, Jesus Christ Superstar) |
| 28 February | Frank Kelly | 77 | Actor (Father Ted, Emmerdale, Aristocrats, Evelyn, Malice Aforethought) |
| 1 March | Louise Plowright | 59 | Actress (Mamma Mia!, EastEnders, Families) |
| 1 March | Tony Warren | 79 | Television scriptwriter and creator of Coronation Street |
| 13 March | Adrienne Corri | 85 | Actress (Doctor Zhivago, A Clockwork Orange, Doctor Who) |
| 15 March | Sylvia Anderson | 88 | Television and film producer, writer and voice actress (Thunderbirds) |
| 16 March | Cliff Michelmore | 96 | Broadcast presenter and producer (Tonight) |
| 17 March | Paul Daniels | 77 | Magician and Game show Host (The Paul Daniels Magic Show, Odd One Out, Every Second Counts, Wipeout) |
| 18 March | Barry Hines | 76 | Author and screenwriter (Kes, The Price of Coal, Threads) |
| 25 March | Terry Brain | 60 | Animator, co-creator of The Trap Door |
| 31 March | Ronnie Corbett | 85 | Comedian, television presenter and actor (The Two Ronnies, Small Talk, You're Only Young Twice, Sorry!, The Frost Report) |
| 31 March | Denise Robertson | 83 | Writer and television broadcaster (This Morning) |
| 31 March | Douglas Wilmer | 96 | Actor (Sherlock Holmes, Octopussy, Jason and the Argonauts) |
| 8 April | David Swift | 85 | Actor (Drop the Dead Donkey) |
| 13 April | Gareth Thomas | 71 | Actor (Blake's 7, Children of the Stones, Star Maidens) |
| 15 April | Morag Siller | 46 | Actor (Emmerdale, Coronation Street, Memphis Belle, Casualty) |
| 18 April | Karina Huff | 55 | Actress (The House of Clocks, Time for Loving, Voices from Beyond) |
| 18 April | John Rapley | 81 | Actor (The Elephant Man, Blackadder, Simon and the Witch, Jane and the Lost City, Goodnight Sweetheart) |
| 20 April | Victoria Wood | 62 | Comedian (New Faces, Victoria Wood: As Seen on TV, Pat and Margaret, dinnerladies, Housewife, 49) |
| 26 April | Mark Farmer | 53 | Actor (Grange Hill, Relative Strangers, Minder, Johnny Jarvis) |
| 28 April | Barry Howard | 78 | Actor (Hi-de-Hi!, Terry and June, You Rang, M'Lord?, The House of Windsor, Dad, Beautiful People) |
| 2 May | Paul McDowell | 84 | Actor and singer (The Temperance Seven) |
| 3 May | Kristian Ealey | 38 | Actor (Brookside, Hollyoaks) |
| 8 May | Gareth Gwenlan | 79 | Television producer (Only Fools and Horses, The Fall and Rise of Reginald Perrin, To the Manor Born, High Hopes) |
| 10 May | Sarah Corp | 41 | Television news journalist and producer (Channel 4 News) |
| 14 May | Valerie Lush | 97 | Actress (And Mother Makes Three) |
| 19 May | Alan Young | 96 | Actor, voice actor, comedian, radio host, television presenter and personality (DuckTales, The Time Machine, Mister Ed, The Alan Young Show) |
| 24 May | Burt Kwouk | 85 | Actor (A Shot in the Dark, Last of the Summer Wine, Goldfinger, Tenko) |
| 25 May | Peggy Spencer | 95 | Professional ballroom dancer, choreographer and judge (Come Dancing) |
| 31 May | Carla Lane | 87 | Television writer (The Liver Birds, Bless This House, Butterflies, Bread, Luv) |
| 6 June | Peter Shaffer | 90 | Playwright and screenwriter (Black Comedy, Equus, Amadeus) |
| 22 June | Harry Rabinowitz | 100 | Music composer and conductor (Reilly, Ace of Spies, Chariots of Fire, Cats) |
| 30 June | Gordon Murray | 95 | Puppeteer and television producer (The Trumptonshire Trilogy (Camberwick Green, Trumpton, Chigley)) |
| 1 July | Robin Hardy | 86 | Film director (The Wicker Man) |
| 2 July | Caroline Aherne | 52 | Actress, television writer and comedian (The Mrs Merton Show, Mrs Merton and Malcolm, The Fast Show, The Royle Family, Strange Hill High, Gogglebox) |
| 2 July | Euan Lloyd | 92 | Film producer (The Wild Geese, The Sea Wolves) |
| 7 July | James Gilbert | 93 | Television producer (The Two Ronnies, Last of the Summer Wine) |
| 8 July | William Lucas | 91 | Actor (The Adventures of Black Beauty, Eldorado) |
| 17 July | Fred Tomlinson | 88 | Singer, songwriter and composer (Monty Python's Flying Circus, The Two Ronnies) |
| 24 July | Tom Clegg | 81 | Television and film director (Space: 1999, Sharpe) |
| 26 July | Sylvia Peters | 90 | Actress and announcer (Come Dancing) |
| 29 July | Ken Barrie | 83 | Singer, narrator and voice actor (Postman Pat, Charlie Chalk) |
| 13 August | Kenny Baker | 81 | Actor (Star Wars, Time Bandits, Flash Gordon) |
| 18 August | Michael Napier Brown | 79 | Actor, theatre director and playwright (The Dick Emery Show, Doctor Who) |
| 19 August | Trevor Baker | 94 | Meteorologist (BBC, Southern Television) |
| 20 August | Brian Rix | 92 | Actor (And the Same to You, Reluctant Heroes) |
| 21 August | Antony Jay | 86 | Writer, broadcaster and director (Yes Minister) |
| 22 August | Michael Leader | 77 | Actor (EastEnders, Star Wars, Doctor Who) |
| 8 September | Hazel Douglas | 92 | Actress (Harry Potter and the Deathly Hallows – Part 1, Gavin & Stacey) |
| 29 September | Ann Emery | 86 | Actress (Billy Elliot, Julia Jekyll and Harriet Hyde, Rentaghost) |
| 29 September | Terence Brady | 77 | Television writer, playwright and actor (Upstairs, Downstairs, No, Honestly, Yes, Honestly) |
| 9 October | Zara Nutley | 92 | Actress (Mind Your Language, Never the Twain) |
| 14 October | Jean Alexander | 90 | Actress (Coronation Street, Last of the Summer Wine) |
| 23 October | Jimmy Perry | 93 | Writer (Dad's Army, It Ain't Half Hot Mum, Hi-de-Hi!, You Rang, M'Lord?) |
| 23 October | Pete Burns | 57 | Singer-songwriter (Dead or Alive) and television personality (Celebrity Big Brother) |
| 25 October | Howard Davies | 71 | Theatre and television director (Copenhagen, Blue/Orange, The Secret Rapture) |
| 5 November | John Carson | 89 | Actor (Doomsday, Captain Kronos – Vampire Hunter, Doctor Who) |
| 7 November | Sir Jimmy Young | 95 | Broadcaster and singer (Juke Box Jury, Thank Your Lucky Stars) |
| 11 November | Robert Vaughn | 83 | American actor (Coronation Street, Hustle) |
| 15 November | Ken Grieve | 74 | Television director (The Bill, Peak Practice) |
| 23 November | Andrew Sachs | 86 | Actor and narrator (Fawlty Towers, Coronation Street, Hitler: The Last Ten Days, William's Wish Wellingtons, Wiggly Park) |
| 27 November | Bernard Gallagher | 87 | Actor (Casualty, Crown Court, Downton Abbey) |
| 27 November | Valerie Gaunt | 84 | Actress (The Curse of Frankenstein, Dracula) |
| 6 December | Peter Vaughan | 93 | Actor (Porridge, Citizen Smith, Chancer, Game of Thrones) |
| 9 December | Coral Atkins | 80 | Actor (A Family at War, Emmerdale) |
| 10 December | Ian McCaskill | 78 | Meteorologist (BBC) |
| 11 December | Michael Nicholson | 79 | War correspondent (Tonight) |
| 21 December | Deddie Davies | 78 | Actress (The Railway Children, Stella, Grange Hill) |
| 22 December | Philip Saville | 86 | Television director and screenwriter (Armchair Theatre, Hamlet at Elsinore, Boys from the Blackstuff) |
| 24 December | Liz Smith | 95 | Actress (The Vicar of Dibley, The Royle Family, I Didn't Know You Cared, Wallace & Gromit: The Curse of the Were-Rabbit) |

== See also ==
- 2016 in British music
- 2016 in British radio
- 2016 in the United Kingdom
- List of British films of 2016
