= Wild West: America's Great Frontier =

- Genre: Nature documentary
- Narrated by: James Norton
- Country of origin: United Kingdom
- Original language: English
- No. of episodes: 3

Production
- Production locations: Western United States and western Mexico
- Production company: BBC Natural History Unit

Original release
- Network: BBC Two
- Release: 2016 – 2016

Wild West: America's Great Frontier is a 2016 British BBC nature documentary about the wildlife of the Western United States and western Mexico. It was narrated by James Norton and was first broadcast on BBC Two.

== Episodes ==
- Desert Heartlands
- The High Country
- Restless Shores
