= Andrew Wilson (presenter) =

British news reporter (born 1960)

- Born: 14 November 1960 (age 65); England
- Education: Clifton College, Bristol (independent boarding school); University of Sheffield
- Occupations: Journalist, television presenter
- Known for: Sky News presenter Fmr. Sky News Washington Correspondent; Fmr. Sky News Middle East Correspondent; Fmr. Sky News Moscow Correspondent; Fmr. TV-am South Africa Correspondent; Former TV-am Asia Correspondent; Journalist & news presenter

Andrew Machell Wilson (born 14 November 1960) is a former Sky News presenter. He was based at Sky News Centre in West London. Since his live reporting of the fall of the Berlin Wall in 1989, he has extensive international reporting experience, having covered almost every major conflict around the world, from Kuwait to Bosnia, and from Haiti to Chechnya. He was a correspondent for TV-am in Hong Kong and Johannesburg, and at Sky News was a correspondent in Moscow, Jerusalem and Washington, winning international awards for his coverage from all three postings. Between 2007 and 2016, he regularly presented the channel's early evening coverage from 5pm to 7pm on Friday to Sunday.

== Early life ==
Wilson was born on 14 November 1960.

== Education ==
Wilson was educated at the Preparatory School, Lower School and Upper School of Clifton College, a boarding independent school for boys in the suburb of Clifton in the port city of Bristol in South West England, boarding at the school from January 1969 – summer 1977, first at Matthews' House, then at Poole's House and finally at School House, followed by the University of Sheffield. After leaving Clifton College, he was awarded a Scholarship to RMA Sandhurst.

Wilson has three step-brothers who also attended Clifton College: the first, Gustave Terence Alexander, who was at the school from January 1957 to summer 1966, and later studied at Peterhouse at the University of Cambridge and the Polytechnic of Central London (since renamed the University of Westminster); the second, Nicholas Stephen Alexander, from September 1958 to April 1968, who later studied Psychology at the University of Birmingham, followed by Manchester Polytechnic (since renamed Manchester Metropolitan University); and the third, Ian Crighton Alexander, from September 1965 to summer 1974, who later studied Modern Languages at Wadham College at the University of Oxford.

== Life and career ==
After leaving university, Wilson briefly became an officer in the British Army. He joined TV-am, the breakfast television franchise holder, becoming Midlands and then Scotland Correspondent for the broadcaster. He became a foreign correspondent for TV-am in November 1989, and reported live from the scene as the Berlin Wall was demolished, following the collapse of East Germany. In 1991, he reported from Kuwait City on the retreating armies of Saddam Hussein. He also reported from Hong Kong and South Africa.

In 1993, Wilson joined Sky News as a reporter. He reported from Bosnia, the Middle East, across Europe, Africa and in Perth, Australia. In 1998, he became Sky News Moscow Correspondent, covering the war in Chechnya. He was also part of the award-winning Sky News team that advanced in 1999 from Macedonia into Kosovo alongside the KFOR troops, and he reported on Boris Yeltsin's resignation on Millennium night. In January 2001, he became Sky News Middle East Correspondent, based in Jerusalem, and was with the first wave of Western reporters to cross overland into Kabul in 2001. He became Sky News US Correspondent in 2004, reporting from locations across the United States on the run-up to, and outcome of, the US Presidential Election. In December 2004, on special assignment to South East Asia, he fronted Sky news coverage in Thailand of the aftermath of the Indian Ocean earthquake and tsunami, and in 2005 reported live on the destructive power of Hurricane Katrina from a Mississippi motel room.

In April 2005, Wilson presented a two-part Sky documentary programme entitled Last Days of the Nazis, shown on Sky One, which assessed Hitler's final moments.

In autumn 2007, Wilson became a news presenter at Sky News Centre in London, presenting Sky News at 5 at weekends. Since then, he has continued to travel on overseas assignments to present important international news stories, fronting Sky's Afghan coverage from Helmand Province, the uprising in Burma, the Russian invasion of Georgia and the Libya conflict from Ajdabiya. He returned to the United States in 2008 and 2012 to cover the US Presidential Elections, reporting live from locations across the country, as he conducted in-depth interviews with numerous voters, politicians and election pollsters on the most salient issues of the respective campaigns.

In 2011, Wilson became one of a handful of broadcast journalists (from Sky News, BBC News and ITV News) who became mentors for journalists entering broadcasting, saying that it had become a "different world" for them, and that he wanted to offer help as "the notion of apprenticeship seems to be disappearing from newsrooms and staff seem to have less time for those coming up behind them".

He left Sky News in July 2016.
