= University Challenge 2015–16 =

Series 45 of University Challenge began on 13 July 2015 on BBC Two.

In this series, several institutions made their University Challenge debut, those being the Institute of Cancer Research and Kellogg College, Oxford, while the University of Kent and Nuffield College, Oxford had only previously appeared in the Bamber Gascoigne era of the show in the 1980s.

== Results ==
- Winning teams are highlighted in **bold**.
- Teams with green scores (winners) returned in the next round, while those with red scores (losers) were eliminated.
- Teams with orange scores had to win one more match to return in the next round (current highest scoring losers, teams that won their first quarter-final match, teams that won their second quarter-final match having lost their first, or teams that won their first quarter-final match and lost their second).
- Teams with yellow scores indicate that two further matches had to be played and won (teams that lost their first quarter-final match).
- Team with gold score in the final indicate the champion of the series, while the team with silver score in the final indicate the runner-up.
- A score in italics indicates a match decided on a tie-breaker question.

=== First round ===
Team 1	Score		Team 2	Total	Broadcast date
University of Glasgow	155	185	**Peterhouse, Cambridge**	340	13 July 2015
**University of Liverpool**	205	130	St Peter's College, Oxford	335	20 July 2015
University of Kent	115	160	**Newcastle University**	275	27 July 2015
University of Manchester	90	265	**University of York**	355	3 August 2015
**University of Nottingham**	135	110	Swansea University	245	10 August 2015
Institute of Cancer Research	70	190	**St George's, University of London**	260	17 August 2015
**Christ's College, Cambridge**	205	60	Kellogg College, Oxford	265	24 August 2015
University of Sussex	125	195	**Queen's University Belfast**	320	31 August 2015
King's College, Cambridge	60	195	**Sidney Sussex College, Cambridge**	255	7 September 2015
University of Reading	110	285	**Imperial College London**	395	14 September 2015
**St Catharine's College, Cambridge**	165	135	University of Southampton	300	21 September 2015
Clare College, Cambridge	100	195	**University of Warwick**	295	28 September 2015
Queen Mary University of London	130	165	**Nuffield College, Oxford**	295	5 October 2015
**St John's College, Oxford**	255	125	University of Bristol	380	12 October 2015

==== Highest Scoring Losers play-offs ====
Team 1	Score		Team 2	Total	Broadcast date
St Peter's College, Oxford	120	180	**University of Glasgow**	300	19 October 2015
**University of Southampton**	235	120	Queen Mary University of London	355	26 October 2015

=== Second round ===
Team 1	Score		Team 2	Total	Broadcast date
Sidney Sussex College, Cambridge	75	305	**Imperial College London**	380	2 November 2015
University of Warwick	120	160	**Nuffield College, Oxford**	280	9 November 2015
University of Glasgow	135	175	**Newcastle University**	310	16 November 2015
University of Southampton	155	190	**University of Liverpool**	345	23 November 2015
Christ's College, Cambridge	120	225	**University of York**	345	30 November 2015
St George's, University of London	90	195	**Peterhouse, Cambridge**	285	7 December 2015
University of Nottingham	120	210	**St Catharine's College, Cambridge**	330	4 January 2016
**St John's College, Oxford**	180	100	Queen's University Belfast	280	11 January 2016

=== Quarter-finals ===
Team 1	Score		Team 2	Total	Broadcast date
University of York	165	185	**Peterhouse, Cambridge**	350	18 January 2016
St Catharine's College, Cambridge	170	175	**St John's College, Oxford**	345	25 January 2016
**Imperial College London**	190	85	Nuffield College, Oxford	275	1 February 2016
Newcastle University	150	190	**University of Liverpool**	340	8 February 2016
St John's College, Oxford	150	195	**Peterhouse, Cambridge**	345	22 February 2016
St Catharine's College, Cambridge	115	180	**University of York**	295	29 February 2016
Imperial College London	130	185	**University of Liverpool**	315	7 March 2016
Nuffield College, Oxford	115	205	**Newcastle University**	320	14 March 2016
**University of York**	260	135	Imperial College London	395	21 March 2016
**St John's College, Oxford**	210	120	Newcastle University	330	28 March 2016

=== Semi-finals ===
Team 1	Score		Team 2	Total	Broadcast date
**Peterhouse, Cambridge**	145	100	University of York	245	4 April 2016
University of Liverpool	95	195	**St John's College, Oxford**	290	11 April 2016

=== Final ===
Team 1	Score		Team 2	Total	Broadcast date
**Peterhouse, Cambridge**	215	30	St John's College, Oxford	245	18 April 2016

- The trophy and title were awarded to the Peterhouse team of Thomas Langley, Oscar Powell, Hannah Woods, and Julian Sutcliffe.
- The trophy was presented by Marcus du Sautoy.

== Spin-off: Christmas Special 2015 ==
Each year, a Christmas special sequence is aired featuring distinguished alumni. Out of 7 first-round winners, the top 4 highest-scoring teams progress to the semi-finals. The teams consist of celebrities who represent their alma maters.

=== Results ===
- Winning teams are highlighted in **bold**.
- Teams with green scores (winners) returned in the next round, while those with red scores (losers) were eliminated.
- Teams with grey scores won their match but did not achieve a high enough score to proceed to the next round.
- A score in italics indicates a match decided on a tie-breaker question.

First Round

Team 1	Score		Team 2	Total	Broadcast date
**University College London**	155	80	University of Birmingham	235	20 December 2015
Oriel College, Oxford	135	140	**Trinity College, Cambridge**	275	21 December 2015
**University of Manchester**	195	35	University of East Anglia	230	22 December 2015
Christ's College, Cambridge	90	140	**University of Essex**	230	23 December 2015
University of Exeter	130	220	**Magdalen College, Oxford**	350	24 December 2015
University of Aberdeen	90	185	**University of Sheffield**	275	28 December 2015
**Durham University**	140	130	London School of Economics	270	29 December 2015

==== Standings for the winners ====
Rank	Team	Team captain	Score
1	Magdalen College, Oxford	Louis Theroux	220
2	University of Manchester	Christine Burns	195
3	University of Sheffield	Adam Hart	185
4	University College London	Lynne Truss	155
5=	Trinity College, Cambridge	Faisal Islam	140
5=	University of Essex	Dotun Adebayo	140
5=	Durham University	Monica Grady	140

Semi-finals

Team 1	Score		Team 2	Total	Broadcast date
University of Manchester	105	160	**University of Sheffield**	265	30 December 2015
University College London	100	195	**Magdalen College, Oxford**	295	31 December 2015

Final

Team 1	Score		Team 2	Total	Broadcast date
University of Sheffield	60	230	**Magdalen College, Oxford**	290	1 January 2016

The winning Magdalen College, Oxford team of Robin Lane Fox, Heather Berlin, Louis Theroux and Matt Ridley beat the University of Sheffield team of Sid Lowe, Nicci Gerrard, Adam Hart and Ruth Reed.
