= Nature's Epic Journeys =

- Artwork using international title
- Also known as: 'Nature's Great Migrations'; 'Nature's Great Race' (PBS version)
- Directed by: Kiri Cashell
- Presented by: Liz Bonnin
- Country of origin: United Kingdom
- Original language: English
- No. of episodes: 3

Production
- Producer: Kiri Cashell
- Running time: 60 minutes
- Production companies: BBC Natural History Unit; BBC Studios; PBS

Original release
- Network: BBC One; BBC One HD
- Release: 11 May – 25 May 2016

Nature's Epic Journeys (also known as Nature's Great Migrations in international release, or Nature's Great Race on PBS release) is a 2016 British nature documentary series created and produced by the BBC and PBS, first shown in May 2016 at BBC One and BBC One HD. The series focus on three animals - Elephant, Caribou and Zebras - which uses technology to track down their migrations.

The series was presented by Liz Bonnin.

== Production ==
The series was announced by the BBC with the working title The Great Race, but it was later changed to Nature's Epic Journeys for the U.K. release.

== Broadcast ==
=== British television ===
Nature's Epic Journeys premiered on British television on 11 May 2016, broadcast on BBC One and BBC One HD, consisted of total three episodes.

=== International ===
BBC Earth channel announced the series began airing on each Sunday afternoon starting from 23 October 2016 in South Africa, and in Asia region on 26 December 2016. BBC Knowledge New Zealand began to air starting from 25 March 2017 - as a part of 'The World Around Us'.

The series debuted in the United States on 12 July 2017 until 26 July 2017 on PBS.

== Episode list ==
All episode names were given from BBC website. All broadcast dates refer to the original UK transmission.

No.	Title	Original release date
1	"Elephants"	11 May 2016
A team follows elephants coming together for a crucial annual gathering in Kenya.
2	"Caribou"	18 May 2016
Following caribou on a 5000km migration through the Arctic wilderness of Canada and Alaska.
3	"Zebra"	25 May 2016
Following zebra on a migration through Botswana to Nxai Pan National Park.
