= Stripped (franchise) =

Danish reality-documentary television franchise

- Created by: Metronome Productions
- Original work: Klædt af

Miscellaneous
- First aired: 14 January 2015
- Distributor: Endemol Shine Group (2015–2020); Banijay Rights (2020–present)
- Based on: Tavarataivas by Petri Luukkainen

Stripped is a Danish reality-documentary television franchise first broadcast in Denmark in 2015, and later international versions were made. The show features participants who "lose" all of their possessions (including clothing), which are stored in a shipping container metres away from their household. They must get one item each day from the container from for between 10 and 30 days. The format is based on the 2013 Finnish documentary film My Stuff, directed by Petri Luukkainen.

As of 13 September 2020, there have been 10 versions of Stripped in 10 countries.

== Versions ==
Country	Name	Channel	Premiere date	End date
Czech Republic	Experiment 21	Prima Cool	16 March 2020	4 May 2020
Denmark	Klædt af (Stripped, Original Edition)	DR3	14 January 2015	18 February 2015
Finland	Riisutut (Stripped)	Sub	9 March 2017	27 April 2017
Germany	Nacktes Überleben - Wie wenig ist genug? (Naked Survival - How Little is Enough?)	Sat.1	29 March 2017	
Israel	מתחילים מאפס; Mathilim Miefes (Starting from Scratch)	Kan 11	2 August 2020	13 September 2020
Portugal	Começar do Zero (Start from Zero)	TVI	17 March 2019	5 May 2019
Spain	El Contenedor (The Container)	Antena 3	22 July 2019	12 August 2019
Sweden	Naken (Naked)	SVT Play	24 October 2016	12 December 2016
United Kingdom	Life Stripped Bare	Channel 4	5 July 2016	
United States	Stripped	Bravo	5 December 2017	30 January 2018
