= Tinkershrimp & Dutch =

- Genre: Animated series Comedy
- Created by: Gregor Stevenson; Chris Stack
- Voices of: Darren Evans; John Boyega; Alex Lowe; Katia Kvinge; Sam Riley
- Composer: Nick McCarthy
- Country of origin: United Kingdom
- Original language: English
- No. of seasons: 1
- No. of episodes: 5

Production
- Running time: 5 minutes
- Production company: Ralph Creative Ltd

Original release
- Network: Nickelodeon
- Release: 15 January – 12 February 2016

Tinkershrimp & Dutch is a British animated web series created by Gregor Stevenson and Chris Stack and produced by Ralph Creative. The series premiered on Nickelodeon's on-demand and online services on 15 January 2016. 5 episodes of the series were produced.

== Plot ==
A langoustine and slow loris who are best friends and time-travelling bodyguards for the eccentric monarch of New Great Great Britain, King Hunnybun III.

== Characters ==
- Tinkershrimp (voiced by Darren Evans) a Welsh-accented langoustine that wears a purple bumbag
- Dutch (voiced by John Boyega) a yellow and black slow loris with the ability to travel back in time.
- King Hunnybun (voiced by Alex Lowe) the ruler of "New Great Great Britain."
- Ingrid (voiced by Katia Kvinge) the blonde-haired pilot of King Hunnybun's mobile Double Decker Castle.
- Michael the Fowl (voiced by Sam Riley) a headless turkey who is the main antagonist of the series.

== Series overview ==
Series	Episodes	Originally aired	
Series	Episodes	First aired	Last aired
1	5	15 January 2016	12 February 2016

== Episodes ==
A single series consisting of five episodes was announced. The series premiered with the episode "Time to Be Polite" on 15 January 2016 and ended with the episode "Time to Be Cool" on 12 February 2016.

=== Series 1 (2016) ===
No.	Title	Directed by	Written by	Original release date
1	"Time to Be Polite"	Gregor Stevenson and Chris Stack	Gregor Stevenson and Chris Stack	15 January 2016
Michael the Fowl hatches an evil plan to sabotage the National Politeness Championships, but will he succeed?
2	"Time to Get a Job"	Gregor Stevenson and Chris Stack	Gregor Stevenson and Chris Stack	22 January 2016
Michael the Fowl prevents King Hunnybun from getting his King's licence so he needs a new job!
3	"Time to Get Fit"	Gregor Stevenson and Chris Stack	Gregor Stevenson and Chris Stack	29 January 2016
King Hunnybun attempts to diet, but he soon gets sabotaged.
4	"Time to Get Real"	Gregor Stevenson and Chris Stack	Gregor Stevenson and Chris Stack	5 February 2016
King Hunnybun creates a robotic king because he's too lazy to do his job, but his plan soon backfires.
5	"Time to Be Cool"	Gregor Stevenson and Chris Stack	Gregor Stevenson and Chris Stack	12 February 2016
King Hunnybun gets invited to the 'Cool Kings Club', but is it all it's cracked up to be?
