= The Silk Road (British TV series) =

The Silk Road is a three-episode BBC TV documentary about the Silk Road, made in 2016. It was presented by historian Sam Willis and comprised three episodes, shown on BBC Four between 1 and 15 May 2016.

== See also ==
- The Silk Road (NHK TV Series), 1980s joint Chinese/Japanese production
