= Last Whites of the East End =

2016 British TV documentary

- Directed by: Kelly Close
- Produced by: Emma Wakefield ,
- Starring: Sophie Stanton
- Distributed by: BBC One
- Release date: 24 May 2016
- Country: United Kingdom
- Language: English

Last Whites of the East End is a documentary which aired on BBC One on 24 May 2016. It presents a portrait of the London Borough of Newham, close to the East End with the lowest percentage of White British people in the country, due both to immigration and the migration of long-time residents, particularly to nearby Essex.

Before and after its broadcast, the documentary's content and claims were criticised by Newham officials, including Mayor Sir Robin Wales. The BBC maintained that it was a balanced broadcast.

== Synopsis ==
The BBC's description of the programme states "Newham has been shaped by immigration for generations, but the past 15 years have been defined by it, as Newham welcomed the highest numbers of new residents anywhere in the country. At the same time more than half the white British population have vanished – breaking apart the tight-knit families their community was built on." The area's last working men's club is described as "a hidden world of tea dances, boxing and drinking in the last club left – an oasis for those left behind".

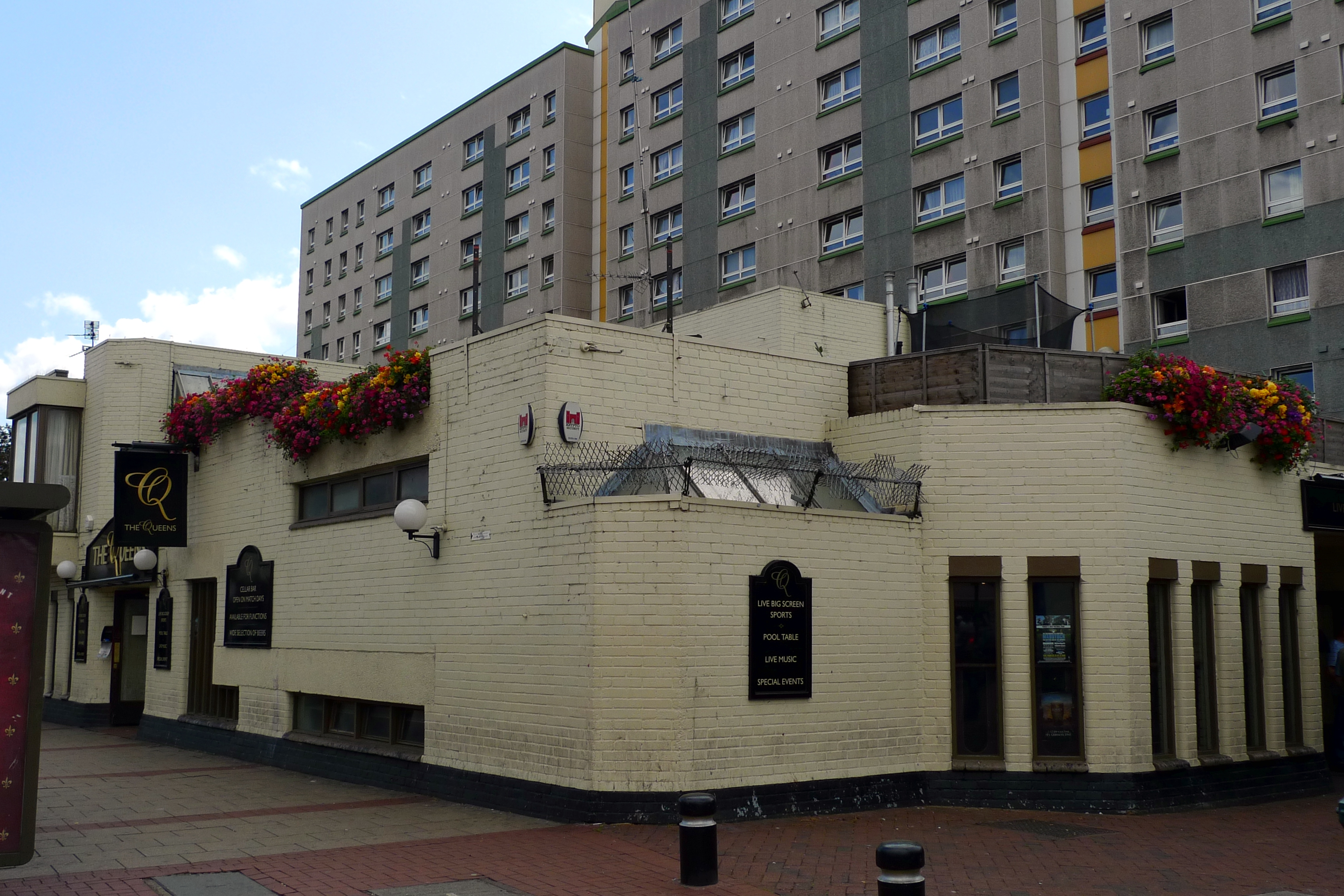
The owner of The Queens pub in Upton Park claims that demographic changes are affecting his business

Usmaan Hussain is a father from Silvertown whose family emigrated from Bangladesh. Despite the racial abuse faced in his youth, he considers himself equally Asian and British. His white friends from his childhood have moved away, and he feels that the Cockney culture will die out soon. However, the demographic changes in his area mean that he can run his own Muslim prayer group without having to travel elsewhere to go to the mosque. His children attend a primary school where 43 native languages are spoken, and he feels that a cohesive "Britishness" between all of the communities "has gone. And I don't think it will ever return". The school's headteacher states that children learn English quickly and get along by being too young to have developed prejudices.

Business owners describe the change of demographics on their finances. Richard Nathan owns a fourth-generation pie and mash shop, which is not frequented by Asians and Eastern Europeans, but sees more business when people return for Mothers' Day. Due to its position near West Ham United's Boleyn Ground at Upton Park, there is expected to be a decline as the team move to the Olympic Stadium.

== Reception ==
An interviewed local student added that East End residents had been moving to suburban Essex since the end of the Second World War, and that phenomenon included British Asians, so talk of "white flight" was unfounded.

Prior to the broadcast, initial news reports suggested that the documentary was to be negative in its content, leading to objections being raised by local authority figures in Newham. The mayor, Sir Robin Wales, said that if it were as negative as made out, it would be a "distorted image" and contribute to ethnic tensions. A borough councillor who had been a teacher for 42 years said that only two complaints were ever made against diverse religious plays by schools in that time. The president of the local Ahmadiyya Muslim community said that he was saddened by white people choosing to leave, saying that life would be better with diverse groups coexisting. The executive producer, Emma Wakefield, replied by stating that there was a balance of views in the documentary, including from those who were staying in the area and those who had left.

After the documentary had aired, Wales wrote in the Newham Recorder that white people were still the borough's largest ethnic group, and a survey showed 9 out of 10 people got on with those from different backgrounds. Dr Ruth Cherrington of the University of East London defended the documentary for highlighting a complex issue, but pointed out that it did not cover the impact of a decrease of social housing on the white working class.

Ali Catterall of The Guardian chastised the show for its "absurdly provocative title", but praised it for a balance between "very illiberal opinions" and "sober, progressive voices" that turned it into "a consistently compelling watch". Despite much debate on Twitter about the programme, Ofcom had received no complaints by the following morning.
