= Alan Carr's Happy Hour =

- Genre: Chat show
- Presented by: Alan Carr
- Country of origin: United Kingdom
- Original language: English
- No. of series: 1
- No. of episodes: 3

Production
- Production locations: Hammersmith, London
- Running time: 60 minutes
- Production companies: Hungry Bear Media; Travesty Media

Original release
- Network: Channel 4
- Release: 2 December – 16 December 2016

Related
- Alan Carr: Chatty Man

Alan Carr's Happy Hour is a British comedy show, presented by comedian Alan Carr. The programme features celebrity guests, sketches, topical chat and music. The first series consisted of three episodes. The first episode of the first series aired on Channel 4 on 2 December 2016 and the last on 16 December 2016.

== Production ==
In October 2016, it was announced that Channel 4 had commissioned a new pre-watershed show titled Alan Carr: Happy Hour, a spin-off to Alan Carr: Chatty Man, which was cancelled on 9 October 2016 due to low ratings battled against BBC One's The Graham Norton Show, which got higher ratings. Happy Hour was to be similar to Chatty Man, however without interviews with celebrities or alcohol, as Channel 4 wanted to attract a younger audience. There would also be audience surprises and games.

The show aired on Fridays at 8 pm on Channel 4.

== Episodes ==
No.	Guests	Original release date	UK viewers (millions)
1	Rebel Wilson, Rob Beckett, Jack Whitehall, Honey G, Amanda Holden, Bastille and James Arthur	2 December 2016	0.76
2	Sarah Millican, Olly Murs, Craig David and Jamie Oliver	9 December 2016	0.72
3	Michelle Keegan, Robbie Williams, Noel Fielding, John Legend, Louisa Johnson and Lady Gaga	16 December 2016	0.85
