= Ingenious Animals =

- Genre: Documentary
- Country of origin: United Kingdom
- Original language: English
- No. of seasons: 1
- No. of episodes: 4

Production
- Running time: 240 min. (4 episodes)
- Production company: BBC Natural History Unit

Original release
- Network: BBC One
- Release: 1 September – 22 September 2016

Ingenious Animals is a BBC nature documentary which aired on BBC One in September 2016. The series ran for four episodes and looks at various aspects of animals and how they relate to each other and the environment.

The series is presented by Hugh Fearnley-Whittingstall and other wildlife experts visiting a variety of locations around the world including Florida, The Bahamas and Kenya.

== Episodes ==
A total of four hour-long episodes were aired as part of the series.

1. Intelligence (1 September 2016)
2. Relationships (8 September 2016)
3. Communication (15 September 2016)
4. Bodies (22 September 2016)
