= Life in the Air =

- Also known as: SuperNature - Wild Flyers
- Genre: Nature documentary
- Narrated by: Suranne Jones
- Country of origin: United Kingdom
- Original language: English
- No. of episodes: 3

Production
- Executive producers: Tim Scoones; Vanessa Berlowitz
- Producers: Simon Bell; James Brickell (series producer)
- Running time: 59-60 minutes
- Production companies: BBC Natural History Unit; PBS

Original release
- Network: BBC One, BBC One HD
- Release: 3 April – 17 April 2016

Life in the Air is a three-part BBC nature documentary series narrated by Suranne Jones, first broadcast in the United Kingdom from 3 April 2016 on BBC One and rebroadcast in the U.S. under the title "SuperNature - Wild Flyers" on PBS.

== Episodes ==
No.	Title	Original release date
1	"Defying Gravity"	3 April 2016
2	"Masters of the Sky"	10 April 2016
3	"Crowded Skies"	17 April 2016
