= Alanna =

Alana
- Gender: Female

Origin
- Origin: English
- Meaning: feminine form of Alan

Other names
- Variant forms: Alana, Alannah, Alanah, Alaina

Alana, Alanna, or other variants, is a female given name. It is latinized feminine form of Alan and its usage is relatively modern.

== People with the given name Alana/Alanna ==
=== Alana ===
- Alana Alexander, New Zealand bioinformatician
- Alana Austin, American actress
- Alana Barber (born 1987), New Zealand race walker
- Alana Bartol (born 1981), Canadian artist
- Alana Beard (born 1982), American basketball player
- Alana Blahoski (born 1974), American ice hockey player
- Alana Blanchard (born 1990), American professional surfer and model
- Alana Boden (born 1997), English actress
- Alana Boyd (born 1984), Australian pole vaulter
- Alana Bremner (born 1997), New Zealand rugby union player
- Alana Bridgewater, Canadian singer and actor from the Canadian production of the musical We Will Rock You
- Alana I. Capria (born 1985), American writer
- Alana Castrique (born 1999), Belgian racing cyclist
- Alana Cook (born 1997), American soccer player
- Alana Cordy-Collins (1944–2015), American archaeologist and professor
- Alana Cruise (1981–2025), American pornographic actress
- Alana Dalzell (born 2001), Northern Irish cricketer
- Alana Dante (born 1969), Belgian singer
- Alana Davis (born 1974), American singer-songwriter
- Alana de la Garza (born 1976), American actress
- Alana DeLong (born c. 1949), Canadian politician
- Alana DiMario (born 1978), American politician
- Alana Dillette (born 1987), Bahamian swimmer and academic
- Alana Evans, American pornographic actress
- Alana Filippi (1960/1961–2020), French singer and songwriter
- Alana Gebremariam (born 1997), Belarusian pro-democracy activist and feminist
- Alana Golmei, Indian humanitarian, activist, and lawyer
- Alana Grace, American actress and singer-songwriter
- Alana Haim (born 1991), American musician and member of the band Haim
- Alana Hawley Purvis, Canadian actress
- Alana Henderson (born 1988), Northern Irish singer-songwriter and cellist
- Alana Hirtle, Canadian politician
- Alana Kavanagh (born 2003), Australian field hockey player
- Alana Khafizova (born 2010), Uzbek rhythmic gymnast
- Alana King (born 1995), Australian cricketer
- Alana Levandoski, Canadian songwriter
- Alaina Lockhart, Canadian politician
- Alana Lowes (born 1980), Australian writer, presenter, and actress
- Alana Maldonado (born 1995), Brazilian Paralympic judoka
- Alana Mann, Australian food activist
- Alana Marshall (born 1987), Scottish footballer
- Alana Massey (born 1985), American writer
- Alana Mayo (born 1984), American film executive and producer
- Alana McLaughlin (born 1983), American mixed martial artist
- Alana Miller (born 1980), Canadian squash player
- Alana Millington (born 1988), Australian-New Zealand field hockey player
- Alana Newhouse (born 1976), American writer and editor
- Alana Nicholls (born 1986), Australian kayaker
- Alana Nichols (born 1983), American Paralympic wheelchair basketball player and alpine skier
- Alana O'Neill (born 1996), American soccer player
- Alana Paon (born 1971), Canadian politician
- Alana Parnaby (born 1994), Australian tennis player
- Alana Patience (born 1980), Australian ballroom dancer and two times winner of Dancing with the Stars
- Alana Pedrozo (born 1992), Paraguayan handball player
- Alana Porter (born 2001), Australian rules footballer
- Alana Ramsay (born 1994), Canadian Paralympic alpine skier
- Alana Reid (born 2005), Jamaican sprinter
- Alana Ross, Canadian politician
- Alana Semuels, American journalist
- Alana Shipp (born 1982), Barbadian-American professional bodybuilder
- Alana Smith (born 1999), American tennis player
- Alana Smith (born 2000), American professional skateboarder
- Alana Spencer (born 1992), Welsh entrepreneur
- Alana Stewart (born 1945), American actress and model
- Alana Thomas (born 1982), Australian rugby union player and coach
- Alana Thompson, American child star of the TLC reality TV series Here Comes Honey Boo Boo
- Alana Toktarova (born 2003), Kazakh figure skater
- Alana Valentine, Australian playwright, dramatist, librettist, and director
- Alana Wilkinson (born 1991), Australian folk singer-songwriter and multi-instrumentalist
- Alana Woodward (born 1990), Australian rules footballer

=== Alanna ===
- Alanna (born 1990), Brazilian footballer
- Alanna Arrington (born 1998), American model
- Alanna Bray-Lougheed (born 1993), Canadian sprint kayaker
- Alanna Broderick (born 1980), Jamaican tennis player
- Alanna Clarke, Canadian singer-songwriter, guitarist, and pianist
- Alanna Clohesy (born 1962), Australian politician
- Alanna Connors (1956–2013), Hong Kong-American astronomer and statistician
- Alanna Devine, Canadian lawyer
- Alanna Fields (born 1990), American multimedia artist and archivist
- Alanna Goldie (born 1994), Canadian fencer
- Alanna Heiss (born 1943), American pioneer of alternative exhibition space
- Alanna Kennedy (born 1995), Australian soccer player
- Alanna Knight (1923–2020), British writer
- Alanna Koch, Canadian civil servant and politician
- Alanna Kraus (born 1977), Canadian short track speed skater
- Alanna Lockward (1961–2019), Dominican author, curator, and filmmaker
- Alanna Masterson (born 1988), American actress
- Alanna Nash (born 1950), American journalist and biographer
- Alanna Nihell (born 1985), Northern Irish boxer
- Alanna Nobbs, Australian historian and current President of the Society for the Study of Early Christianity
- Alanna O'Kelly (born 1955), Irish artist
- Alanna Rizzo (born 1975), American sports reporter
- Alanna Routledge (born 1990), Canadian curler
- Alanna Schepartz (born 1962), American scientist
- Alanna Smith (born 1996), Australian basketball player
- Alanna Ubach (born 1975), American actress
- Alanna Yakiwchuk (born 1965), Canadian sprinter

== Fictional characters ==
- Alana, a female Transformer from Transformers: Generation 1
- Alana Beck, from Dear Evan Hansen
- Alanna Mosvani, in Robert Jordan's Wheel of Time series
- Alanna of Trebond, in Tamora Pierce's Tortall novels, beginning with Alanna: The First Adventure
- Alana Reeves, the main character in the novel Forget Me Not by Elizabeth Lowell
- Alana, in the 1990s Australian TV series The Girl from Tomorrow
- Alana Rivera, a recurring antagonist in the second season of the Disney Channel series That's So Raven
- Alana, one of Ariel's sisters in The Little Mermaid franchise
- Alana Bloom, in the TV series Hannibal
- Alana from the Saga comic book series
- Alanna, an inhabitant of the planet Rann in American comic books published by DC Comics
- Alana Fitzgerald, a character in the Family Guy episode, "All About Alana".
- Alhana Starbreeze, character in Dragonlance's saga
- Alanna McVey, fictional character from River City
