= MasterChef Australia series 3 =

MasterChef Australia
- Season 3
- Judges: Matt Preston; George Calombaris; Gary Mehigan; Matt Moran
- No. of contestants: 24
- Winner: Kate Bracks
- Runner-up: Michael Weldon
- No. of episodes: 86

Release
- Original network: Network Ten
- Original release: 1 May – 7 August 2011

Series chronology
- ← Previous; Series 2 Next → Series 4

The third series of the Australian cooking game show MasterChef Australia premiered on Sunday, 1 May 2011 at 7:30 pm on Network Ten. Judges George Calombaris, Gary Mehigan and Matt Preston returned from the previous series and were joined by Matt Moran. The third series was won by Kate Bracks who defeated Michael Weldon in the grand finale on 7 August 2011. The second part of the series' final (episode 85, "The Winner Announced"), attracted an audience of 2.74 million viewers, making it the third most viewed episode of any Australian television series of 2011, only beaten by the final episodes of The Block (3.09 million) and Australia's Got Talent (2.98 million).

== Changes ==
The third series of MasterChef Australia brought some changes to the format of the show. Joining the judging panel as a regular guest was chef Matt Moran. A twist used in past series of the show to bring back eliminated contestants for a second chance was dropped for series 3.

While the weekly routine was mostly unchanged, there were some small differences in series 3.

Sunday night's challenge was not restricted to a Mystery Box Challenge and an Invention Test, with Team and Offsite Challenges also used.

The Tuesday night challenge was modified: now known as an immunity challenge rather than a celebrity chef challenge; the standing of the opponent varied, with anyone from a contestant to an apprentice or a well-known chef appearing. The rules varied slightly from week to week, but typically the contestant(s) were given a recipe and a time advantage but neither competitor had knowledge of what they were about to cook until just before the challenge started.

Eliminations on Thursdays were no longer decided by taste tests; final challenges were based on cooking.

== Contestants ==
=== Opening Week ===
The opening week of MasterChef Australia saw 50 contestants competing for the 24 positions in the main competition. Twenty-six were eliminated:

Episode 1	Episode 2	Episode 4	Episode 7	
Tony Plowman – QLD	Tanja Binggeli – NSW	Alby Pintore – VIC	Marie Anne Lyons – VIC	Samantha Denton – WA
Michael Suthers – QLD	Cindy Harrington – QLD	Elisa Goethals – VIC	Nick Kulakoff – SA	Rod Watkins – VIC
Sarah Arnold – QLD	Craig Pedrola – NSW	Jess Nicholls – QLD	Sam Gadsden – VIC	Greg Andren – NSW
Dai Do – SA	Elizabeth Hallam – VIC	Myri Timotheou – SA	Ariana Heemi – VIC	John Hughes – SA
Nathan Mallon – VIC	Liz Theodoros – SA		Daniel Vaughan – VIC	Vittoria Chiarilli – VIC
			Gemma Seeto – QLD	Alex Glasson – WA (Note: Alex Glasson was initially eliminated at the final stage of the Top 50 portion of the show, but received the final Top 24 spot after Paul Lombardi had to quit due to work commitments.)

=== Top 24 ===
The full Top 24 were revealed on Sunday, 8 May. At the first Top 24 challenge, it was revealed that Paul had quit the competition due to work commitments and Alex, who had been eliminated in the Top 50 portion, was entered as his replacement.

Contestant	Age	State	Occupation	Status
Kate Bracks	35	NSW	Mum	Winner 7 August
Michael Weldon	25	SA	Film Projectionist	Runner-up 7 August
Alana Lowes	31	QLD	Journalist	Eliminated 4 August
Dani Venn	25	VIC	Publicist	Eliminated 2 August
Ellie Paxton-Hall	20	QLD	Student Nurse	Eliminated 28 July
Hayden Quinn	24	NSW	Professional Lifeguard	Eliminated 21 July
Billy Law	34	NSW	Web Designer	Eliminated 18 July; Returned 6 July; Initially Eliminated 4 July
Sún Etheridge	32	QLD	Credit Analyst	Eliminated 14 July
Peter Vickery	50	NSW	Account Manager	Eliminated 7 July
Mat Beyer	24	VIC	IT Tech Support	Disqualified 6 July
Kumar Pereira	62	NSW	Design Teacher	Eliminated 30 June
Danielle Dixon	29	QLD	Admin Manager	Eliminated 27 June
Craig Young	43	QLD	Professional Musician	Eliminated 23 June
Adam Bowen	31	QLD	Scuba Diving Instructor	Quit 20 June
Shannon Smyth	26	QLD	Receptionist	Eliminated 16 June
Rachel McSweeney	45	WA	Office Administrator	Eliminated 13 June
Arena Dunn	25	WA	Personal Trainer	Eliminated 9 June
Jay Huxley	31	NSW	Car Sales Manager	Eliminated 6 June
Andrew Henderson	37	SA	Youth Worker	Eliminated 2 June
Cleo Kerameas	45	NSW	Executive Assistant	Eliminated 26 May
Chelsea Fammartino	34	VIC	Retail Assistant	Eliminated 23 May
Seamus Ashley	32	VIC	Graphic & Web Designer	Eliminated 19 May
Alex Glasson	26	WA	CNC Machinist	Eliminated 16 May
Tom Rutledge	29	NSW	General manager	Eliminated 12 May
Paul Lombardi	33	WA	Fighter Pilot	Quit 9 May (work commitment)

Future appearances

- In Series 4 Kate Bracks appeared as a guest judge for a Mystery Box Challenge.
- Kate appeared on a Special All Star series for charity along with Kumar Pereira, Hayden Quinn and Dani Venn. Kumar came 12th, Hayden came 10th, Dani came 6th and Kate came 3rd.
- In Series 6 Kate appeared as a guest judge for both the Mystery Box and Invention Test Challenge.
- In a superstar themed week in Series 7 Hayden appeared as a guest judge for an Invention Test challenge.
- Kate appeared at the Auditions for Series 10 to support the Top 50, while Hayden & Kumar all appeared as guests for the semi final service challenge along with Michael Weldon, Ellie Paxton-Hall, Billy Hall & Peter Vickery.
- Dani and Hayden appeared on Series 12. Dani was eliminated on 3 May 2020, finishing 20th and Hayden was eliminated on 17 May 2020, finishing 15th. Michael also appeared in 'Twist Week' for a Masterclass Lesson.
- In Series 14 Michael appeared for another chance to win the title. Michael was eliminated on 12 June 2022, finishing 11th.
- In Series 16 Michael appeared as a guest for the 1st service challenge.
- Alana Lowes appeared on Series 17 and was eliminated on 13 July 2025, finishing 8th.

== Guests ==
- Adriano Zumbo – Series Premiere: Top 50: Part 1, Pressure Test 10
- Maggie Beer – Top 50: Part 2, MasterClass 1, Pressure Test 9
- Justin North – Immunity Challenge 1, MasterClass 2, MasterClass 9
- Alessandro Pavoni – Immunity Challenge 1, MasterClass 2, Immunity Challenge 9
- Alex Keene – Immunity Challenge 1, Immunity Challenge 9
- Andrew Connole – Offsite Challenge 1
- Jean-Luc Rocha – Elimination Challenge 1
- Abla Amad – Elimination Challenge 1
- Shaun Presland – Elimination Challenge 1, MasterClass 14
- Andrew McConnell – Immunity Challenge 2
- Colin Fassnidge – Immunity Challenge 2, MasterClass 3, Worst Nightmare Challenge
- Jonathan Barthelmess – Elimination Challenge 2
- Leanne Beck – MasterClass 3
- Mark Jensen – Immunity Challenge 3
- Adam D'Sylva – Immunity Challenge 3
- Reuben Radonich – Elimination Challenge 3
- Romeo Baudouin – MasterClass 4
- Donna Hay – MasterClass 4
- Jake Drachenberg – W.A. Invention Test
- Hadleigh Troy – Immunity Challenge 4
- Tony Howell – Immunity Challenge 4
- Stefano Manfredi – Elimination Challenge 4
- Frank Shek – MasterClass 5
- Dan Hong – Pressure Test 3
- Martin Boetz – Immunity Challenge 5
- Thorsten Schmidt – Immunity Challenge 5
- Nigella Lawson – Offsite Challenge 4
- Tetsuya Wakuda – Elimination Challenge 5
- Elena Arzak – Elimination Challenge 5
- Miguel Maestre – MasterClass 6
- Rick Stein – MasterClass 6
- Chef Wan – MasterClass 6
- Neil Perry – QANTAS Fine Dining Challenge, QANTAS First Lounge Challenge
- Thomas Keller – QANTAS Fine Dining Challenge
- Andoni Aduriz – QANTAS Fine Dining Challenge
- Heston Blumenthal – Pressure Test 4
- Darren Purchese – Immunity Challenge 6
- Matt Stone – Offsite Challenge 5
- James Privett – MasterClass 7
- David Chang – Sunday Challenge 6, Ultimate Dinner Party Challenge
- Mary Calombaris – Pressure Test 5, MasterClass 8
- Jeremy Strode – Immunity Challenge 7
- Vincent Gadan – Immunity Challenge 7, MasterClass 8
- Shane Osborn – Elimination Challenge 7
- Christine Manfield – MasterClass 8, Immunity Challenge 8
- Jim Moran – Sunday Challenge 7
- Matthew Kemp – Pressure Test 6
- Merle Parrish – Immunity Challenge 8
- Dietmar Sawyere – Elimination Challenge 8
- Fleur Sullivan – MasterClass 9
- Al Brown – MasterClass 9
- Simon Gault – MasterClass 9
- Martin Bosley – MasterClass 9
- Shane Delia – Sunday Challenge 8
- Armando Percuoco – Immunity Challenge 9
- Marco Pierre White – Offsite Challenge 8
- Anthony Bourdain – Elimination Challenge 9, Sunday Challenge 9
- Andre Ursini – Masterclass 10
- Jimmy Seervai – Masterclass 10
- Luke Nguyen – Masterclass 10
- Alvin Quah – Masterclass 10
- Eric Ripert – Sunday Challenge 9
- Armando Monterroso – United Nations Challenge
- Lidia Bastianich – Immunity Challenge 10
- Cesare Casella – Immunity Challenge 10
- Jon Bignelli – Ultimate Dinner Party Challenge
- Paul Liebrandt – Ultimate Dinner Party Challenge
- Kenneth Woods – Elimination Challenge 10
- Tren'ness Woods-Black – Elimination Challenge 10
- Sylvia Woods – Elimination Challenge 10
- Daniel Boulud – MasterClass 11
- Sandy Levine – MasterClass 11
- Steve Evetts – MasterClass 11
- Kylie Kwong – Sunday Challenge 10
- 14th Dalai Lama – Sunday Challenge 10
- Tim Costello – Sunday Challenge 10
- Shanaka Fernando – Sunday Challenge 10
- Bill Crews – Sunday Challenge 10
- Ronnie Khan – Sunday Challenge 10
- Katrina Kanetani – Pressure Test 8
- Philippa Sibley – Immunity Challenge 11
- Eamon Sullivan – Immunity Challenge 11
- Alan Joyce – QANTAS First Lounge Challenge
- Ben Milgate – MasterClass 12
- Elvis Abrahanowicz – MasterClass 12
- Mark Olive – MasterClass 12
- Shannon Bennett – Immunity Challenge 12, MasterClass 14
- Teage Ezard – Immunity Challenge 12
- Donovan Cook – Worst Nightmare Challenge
- Ashly Hicks – Worst Nightmare Challenge
- Anthea Leonard – MasterClass 13
- Curtis Stone – Sunday Challenge 12
- Mark Best – Three Hat Challenge
- Peter Doyle – Three Hat Challenge
- Peter Gilmore – Three Hat Challenge
- Martin Benn – MasterClass 14
- René Redzepi – Grand Finale

== Elimination chart ==
No.	Week	1	2		3		4		5			6		7		8		9		10		11			12		Semi-Finals Week			Finals Week			
No.	Sunday Challenge Winner	None	Hayden		Jay		Craig Peter Sún		Adam; Billy; Dani; Ellie; Jay; Kumar; Michael; Peter; Rachel; Sún			Danielle		Danielle Kate		Hayden		Billy		(Kate) Dani		Michael			Dani		Michael			Michael			
No.	Immunity Challenge	None	Win: Hayden		Lose: Jay		Lose: Craig Peter Sún		Lose: Jay			Lose: Danielle		Lose: Kate		Lose: Hayden		Lose: Billy		Draw: Dani		Win: Ellie			Win: Dani		Lose: Michael			None			
1	Kate	Top 24	Top 3	Team Lose	IN	Team Win	IN	Team Win	Team Lose		IN	IN	Team Win	S.C. Winner	Team Win	IN	Team Win	IN	Team Win	IN	Btm 2	Top 3	IN	Btm 4	Btm 3	Team Lose	IN	IN	Win	IN	Win	Btm 2	WINNER
2	Michael	Top 24	IN	Team Lose	IN	Team Lose	IN	Team Win	Team Win	Top 2	IN	Top 4	Team Lose	Btm 4	Team Lose	Btm 3	Team Lose	Top 2	Btm 2	Top 3	Team Lose	Win	IN	Btm 4	Top 2	Btm 2	S.C. Winner	IN	Top 2	S.C. Winner	Btm 2	Win	Runner-Up
3	Alana	Top 24	IN	Team Lose	IN	Team Win	IN	Team Win	Team Lose		Top 5	IN	Team Lose	IN	Team Win	IN	Btm 2	IN	Team Win	IN	Team Win	Top 3	IN	Win	IN	Team Win	IN	Win	Btm 3	IN	Win	Elim	Eliminated (Ep 83)
4	Dani	Top 24	IN	Team Win	IN	Team Win	IN	Team Lose	Team Win	IN	IN	Btm 3	Team Lose	IN	Team Lose	Top 3	Team Lose	IN	Team Win	S.C. Winner	Team Lose/Imm.	Btm 2	Btm 2	Lose	S.C. Winner	Team Win	IN	IN	Btm 2/Imm.	IN	Elim	Eliminated (Ep 81)	
5	Ellie	Top 24	IN	Team Lose	Btm 3	Team Win	Btm 3	Team Win	Team Win	IN	IN	Btm 3	Team Lose	IN	Team Lose	DNP	Team Win	Btm 3	Team Win	IN	Team Win	IN	Win	Win	Btm 3/Imm.	Team Win	IN	IN	Elim	Eliminated (Ep 77)			
6	Hayden	Top 24	S.C. Winner	Team Lose	IN	Team Lose	IN	Team Lose	Team Lose		IN	IN	Team Lose	IN	Team Win	S.C. Winner	Imm.	IN	Team Lose/Imm.	Btm 3	Team Lose	IN	Top 2	Lose	IN	Elim	Eliminated (Ep 71)						
7	Billy	Top 24	Top 3	Team Win	Btm 3	Team Lose	IN	Team Lose	Team Win	IN	Win	IN	Team Win	IN	Team Lose	IN	Team Win	S.C. Winner	Team Lose	Elim	Team Win	Top 3	Lose		Elim	Re-Eliminated (Ep 68)							
8	Sún	Top 24	IN	Team Win	IN	Team Win	S.C. Winner	Team Lose	Team Win	IN	IN	IN	Team Win	IN	Team Win	IN	Team Win	IN	Team Win	IN	Team Win	Elim			Eliminated (Ep 65)								
9	Peter	Top 24	IN	Team Win	IN	Team Lose	S.C. Winner	Btm 3	Team Win	IN	IN	IN	Team Win	IN	Team Win	Top 3	Team Lose	Btm 3	Team Lose	Top 3	Elim	Eliminated (Ep 59)											
10	Mat	Top 24	IN	Team Lose	IN	Team Lose	IN	Team Win	Team Lose		IN	IN	Team Lose	IN	Team Win	IN	Team Lose	IN	Team Win	Btm 3	DSQ	Disqualified (Ep 58)											
11	Kumar	Top 24	IN	Btm 2	IN	Team Lose	IN	Btm 3	Team Win	IN	Btm 2	IN	Team Win	IN	Team Win	IN	Team Win	IN	Elim	Eliminated (Ep 53)													
12	Danielle	Top 24	IN	Team Lose	IN	Team Win	IN	Team Win	Team Lose		IN	S.C. Winner	Team Lose	S.C. Winner	Team Lose	Btm 3	Team Win	Elim	Eliminated (Ep 50)														
13	Craig	Top 24	IN	Team Win	Top 3	Team Lose	S.C. Winner	Team Lose	Team Lose		IN	IN	Team Win	Btm 4	Btm 2	IN	Elim	Eliminated (Ep 47)															
14	Adam	Top 24	IN	Team Win	IN	Team Lose	IN	Team Lose	Team Win	IN	Top 5	IN	Team Win	IN	Team Win	Quit	Withdrew (Ep 44)																
15	Shannon	Top 24	IN	Team Win	IN	Team Win	IN	Team Win	Team Lose		Win	Top 4	Btm 2	Btm 4	Elim	Eliminated (Ep 41)																	
16	Rachel	Top 24	IN	Team Lose	IN	Team Win	Btm 3	Team Win	Team Win	IN	IN	IN	Team Win	Elim	Eliminated (Ep 38)																		
17	Arena	Top 24	IN	Team Lose	IN	Team Win	IN	Team Win	Team Lose		Top 5	Top 4	Elim	Eliminated (Ep 35)																			
18	Jay	Top 24	IN	Team Win	S.C. Winner	Team Lose	IN	Team Win	Team Win	Win	Imm.	Elim	Eliminated (Ep 32)																				
19	Andrew	Top 24	IN	Team Win	IN	Btm 2	IN	Team Lose	Team Lose		Elim	Eliminated (Ep 29)																					
20	Cleo	Top 24	IN	Team Win	Top 3	Team Win	IN	Elim	Eliminated (Ep 23)																								
21	Chelsea	Top 24	IN	Team Win	IN	Team Win	Elim	Eliminated (Ep 20)																									
22	Seamus	Top 24	IN	Team Lose	IN	Elim	Eliminated (Ep 17)																										
23	Alex	Return	IN	Team Win	Elim	Eliminated (Ep 14)																											
24	Tom	Top 24	IN	Elim	Eliminated (Ep 11)																												
25	Paul	Quit	Withdrew (Ep 8)																														
	Notes	^{See note 1}	^{See note 2}	None		^{See note 3}	^{See note 4}	^{See note 5}	^{See note 6}	^{See note 7}	^{See note 8}	None		^{See note 9}	^{See note 3}	^{See note 10}	^{See note 11}	None	^{See note 12}	^{See note 13}	^{See note 14}	^{See note 15}	^{See note 16}	^{See note 17}	^{See note 18}	^{See note 5}	^{See note 19}	^{See note 20}	^{See note 21}	^{See note 19}	^{See note 22}	None	
	Eliminated	(Alex) Paul	None	Tom	Alex	Seamus	Chelsea	Cleo	None	None	Andrew	Jay Re-Eliminated	Arena	Rachel	Shannon	Adam	Craig	Danielle	Kumar	Billy 1st Elimination	(Billy) Mat Peter	Sún			Billy Re-Eliminated	Hayden	None	None	Ellie	None	Dani	Alana	Michael; 82 points to win
	Eliminated	(Alex) Paul	None	Tom	Alex	Seamus	Chelsea	Cleo	None	None	Andrew	Jay Re-Eliminated	Arena	Rachel	Shannon	Adam	Craig	Danielle	Kumar	Billy 1st Elimination	(Billy) Mat Peter	Sún			Billy Re-Eliminated	Hayden	None	None	Ellie	None	Dani	Alana	Kate; 87 points to win

- ^1 In Week 1, the judges selected the twenty-four finalists from the Top 50.
- ^2 In Week 2, prior to the first Top 24 challenge, it was revealed that Paul had withdrawn from the competition citing work commitments. His place was taken by Alex. Also, instead of the traditional Sunday Challenge, contestants were asked to cook the dish that "changed their life". There was no Bottom 3 for this challenge.
- ^3 In Weeks 3 and 7, the entire losing team went through to the Elimination Challenge, where they competed in three rounds, until two remained for the final round.
- ^4 In Week 4, the Sunday Challenge featured contestants working in groups of three. The entire winning team went into the Immunity Challenge.
- ^5 In Weeks 4, 9 and 12 the entire losing team went through to the Elimination Challenge, from which the bottom performers were selected.
- ^6 In Week 5 (Western Australia Week), the Sunday Challenge was a Team Challenge. The losing team did not face elimination.
- ^7 In Week 5, the winners of the Team Challenge competed for a spot in the Immunity Challenge. The winner also received immunity for the next Elimination Challenge.
- ^8 In Week 5, Wednesday's challenge was an individual cooking challenge. The Bottom 2 went into an Elimination Challenge, and the Top 2 received a special reward and MasterClass.
- ^9 In Week 7, the Sunday Challenge featured contestants working in pairs. The winning pair decided amongst themselves who would contest the Immunity Challenge, while the two worst performing teams went into an Elimination Challenge.
- ^10 In Week 8s Mystery Box Challenge, Ellie was unwell and was pulled to the Pressure Test. In week 8s Pressure Test, Adam was not the weakest competitor but chose to withdraw from the competition.
- ^11 In Week 8, the entire losing team went through to the Elimination Challenge, where they competed in two preliminary rounds. The weakest performer from each preliminary round was sent to the final cook-off.
- ^12 In Week 9, the entire losing team went through to the Elimination Challenge, where the Bottom two were selected. Hayden used his immunity pin and did not to take part in the Elimination.
- ^13 In Week 10, the Sunday Challenge featured a Mystery Box challenge and Invention Test. Kate won the Mystery Box challenge, while Dani won the Invention Test. Prior to the Offsite Challenge, Mat was removed from the competition for using a smartphone, his place taken by last eliminated contestant Billy.
- ^14 In Week 10, the entire losing team went through to the Elimination Challenge, where they competed in three rounds, until two remained for the final round. Dani used her immunity pin and did not to take part in the Elimination. The Top 2 from the winning team then got a reward (flying business class to New York City).
- ^15 In Week 11, the Sunday Challenge was the first in a week in New York. The loser of the challenge went into lockdown for an elimination challenge later in the week.
- ^16 In Week 11, instead of a Pressure Test contestants competed to win the chance to take part in the Celebrity Chef Challenge. Ellie won the challenge. The loser of the challenge went into lockdown for an elimination challenge later in the week.
- ^17 In Week 11, the New York team challenge featured three teams of two.
- ^18 In Week 12s Pressure Test, Ellie used her immunity pin and did not to take part in the Pressure Test.
- ^19 In Semi-Finals Week and Finals Week, there was no bottom for the Sunday Challenge.
- ^20 In Semi-Finals Week, instead of a Pressure Test the Top 5 cooked a meal for their families. There was no bottom for this challenge.
- ^21 In Semi-Finals Week, despite not being in the Bottom 2, Alana was pulled into the Elimination Challenge when Dani used her Immunity pin.
- ^22 In Finals Week's Pressure Test, no contestant reproduced a dish of sufficient quality, placing them all in an Elimination Challenge.

== Episodes and Ratings ==
Ep#/Wk-Ep#	Original airdate	Episode Title / Event	Total viewers (5 Metro Cities)	Nightly Ranking	Weekly Ranking
Week 1
1/01-1	Sunday 1 May 2011	Series Premiere: Top 50 Part 1 – The top 50 began with a giant mystery box challenge, using commonly bought ingredients. Michael W. had the best dish of the day, while the ten worst performers were sent into a chocolate elimination challenge led by Adriano Zumbo. The following five contestants: Michael S, Tony, Sarah, Nathan, and Dai produced the worst dishes and were eliminated from the competition.	1,569,000	1st	7th
2/01-2	Monday 2 May 2011	Top 50 Part 2 – The remaining 45 contestants competed in a three-stage basic skills test. The five slowest to prepare 2 kg of potatoes for chips, to hand whisk a basic mayonnaise, and to correctly segment a whole chicken went into an elimination round of scone-making. Craig P, Cindy, Tanja, Elizabeth, and Liz produced the least consistent and worst tasting scones and were eliminated from the competition.	1,656,000	2nd	2nd
3/01-3	Tuesday 3 May 2011	Top 50 Part 3 – 40 contestants competed in a Pressure Test, vying for six spots in the Top 24. They each had two hours to complete a dessert tasting plate set by Maggie Beer. Most contestants struggled with such a challenge, with one not presenting a dish to the judges because he felt it was not of acceptable quality. Craig Y. was awarded the first spot after tasting. In the end, Michael, Kate, Adam, Hayden, and Cleo received the remaining 5 spots and secured their place in the main competition, while the ten least impressive performers went into an Elimination Challenge.	1,593,000	1st	4th
4/01-4	Wednesday 4 May 2011	Top 50 Part 4 – The ten least impressive from the Pressure Test were given a choice as to what would be the core of their Elimination Challenge dish; they could spend two hours on a fishing boat and risk what (if anything) they caught, or use a mystery ingredient unknown until the start of the challenge. Of the four that chose fishing, all caught at least one fish, while crocodile was revealed as the mystery ingredient for the remaining six. Elisa, Jess, Myri, and Alby struggled with preparing such an unfamiliar meat and were sent home.	1,519,000	1st	8th
5/01-5	Thursday 5 May 2011	Top 50 Part 5 – The remaining contestants competed for six more spots in the Top 24, cooking a "desert island dish" with five of their favourite ingredients. With the freedom to cook their favourite dish and no threat of elimination, many contestants talents shone through. In the end, Alana, Billy, Arena, Kumar, Seamus and Danielle received their spots in the main competition.	1,633,000	1st	3rd
6/01-6	Friday 6 May 2011	MasterClass 1	1,020,000	2nd	28th
Week 2
7/02-1	Sunday 8 May 2011	Top 50 Part 6 – With the final twelve spots in the Top 24 on the line, the remaining contestants competed in two challenges, a taste test and an invention test. The twenty-four hopefuls were given three minutes to each taste and name as many of the thirty ingredients of Aria's Consommé, provided by Matt Moran. It was revealed that for the invention test, they would receive only the ingredients they correctly identified in the Consommé; those who fared poorly in the taste test struggled with the limitations of the challenge. Ultimately, after some debate by the judges, Andrew, Shannon, Peter, Paul, Rachel, Dani, Tom, Sun, Jay, Ellie, Mat and Chelsea emerged successful, completing the Top 24. While Marie, Nick, Gemma, Samantha, Sam, John, Rod, Vittoria, Ariana, Daniel, and Greg were eliminated, and after surviving 3 pressure tests, Alex was eliminated as well, or is he?	1,503,000	3rd	5th
8/02-2	Monday 9 May 2011	Top 24 Cooking Challenge – Matt went to Alex's house to bring him back in competition after Paul's withdrawal. The contestants competed in their first challenge in the MasterChef kitchen: preparing the dish that "changed their life". Hayden, Billy and Kate were judged the best of the day, and it was Hayden who won the right to contest the first Immunity Challenge of the series.	1,523,000	1st	6th (1,502,000)
9/02-3	Tuesday 10 May 2011	Immunity Challenge 1 – Hayden beat Ormeggio apprentice Alex Keene (22-21)	1,440,000	2nd	6th (1,502,000)
10/02-4	Wednesday 11 May 2011	Offsite Challenge 1 – Contestants were rudely awoken at midnight to discover their first team challenge: baking bread for five of Sydney's top restaurants. After being randomly selected into teams, Sun was nominated leader of the Blue Team and Tom the Red Team. The Blue Team struggled with organization and made a couple of crucial errors in the early stages of the challenge, but recovered well to just edge out the Red Team for victory.	1,443,000	2nd	6th (1,502,000)
11/02-5	Thursday 12 May 2011	Elimination Challenge 1 – As the Blue Team enjoyed their reward, the Red Team were asked to nominate their two worst performers for an In-the-round Elimination Challenge. Tom, who took responsibility as team leader, and Kumar, whose ciabatta bread contributed to the team's loss put themselves forward. They were given 90 minutes to use three guests favourite ingredients to make three of their favourite dishes with no aid of a recipe. Ultimately, Kumar received two votes to Tom's one, sealing Tom's exit from the competition.	1,571,000	1st	6th (1,502,000)
12/02-6	Friday 13 May 2011	MasterClass 2	840,000	7th	34th
Week 3
13/03-1	Sunday 15 May 2011	Sunday Challenge 1 – In a Mystery Box which included rabbit and mustard fruits, contestants were tasked with producing a dish which contained every ingredient in the box. The quality of dishes presented varied wildly, with many highs and many lows, the unfamiliarity of the meat proving to be a curse for many. After a difficult decision by the judges, it was Jay who beat out Cleo and Craig for dish of the day, while Billy, Ellie and Alex landed in the Bottom 3, facing elimination.	1,409,000	4th	9th
14/03-2	Monday 16 May 2011	Pressure Test 1 – Billy, Ellie and Alex were faced with a Cherry Bombe Alaska and a two-hour time limit. Each contestant faced the challenge differently; Ellie worked calmly and methodically, Billy took a number of shortcuts and deviated from the recipe in a few key areas, and Alex struggled to juggle each element, quickly falling behind and only just finishing after judges intervention. In the end, Ellie wowed the judges with her recreation, and while Billy was warned for departing from the recipe, it was Alex who was eliminated, this time for good.	1,571,000	1st	4th
15/03-3	Tuesday 17 May 2011	Immunity Challenge 2 – Colin Fassnidge beat Jay (26-19)	1,373,000	2nd	11th
16/03-4	Wednesday 18 May 2011	Offsite Challenge 2 – The male and female contestants faced off against each other as they took over the running of the Mean Fiddler pub for a regular evening service. They each were tasked to prepare a menu of seven items fitting certain criteria, for example one burger, one special, one dessert, etc. The judges tasted the dishes and scored each team, also taking into account customer reaction. While both teams had big problems, especially with their steak orders, it was the male Red team's 16 returned meals that sent them straight to elimination.	1,401,000	2nd	10th
17/03-5	Thursday 19 May 2011	Elimination Challenge 2 – After losing the battle of the sexes, the entire Red team faced a three-round Elimination Challenge. They had the freedom to cook whatever they wanted, but only a short amount of time in which to prepare their dish (ten or fifteen minutes). Contestants were declared safe at the end of each round and by the final round only Andrew and Seamus remained. Seamus was deemed to have delivered the weaker dish and was eliminated.	1,507,000	1st	6th
18/03-6	Friday 20 May 2011	MasterClass 3	988,000	5th	29th
Week 4
19/04-1	Sunday 22 May 2011	Sunday Challenge 2 – Contestants competed in teams of three in a mix of Invention Test and Mystery Box. Each team randomly chose a protein (such as pork or scallops) and a cooking method (such as roasting or braising) and were tasked with creating a dish around that element. Some teams struggled with their unusual combinations, such as cooking snapper en croute (in pastry), but Sun, Peter and Craig triumphed with their pork en papillote (in paper). Chelsea, Rachel and Ellie's smoked octopus was judged the least impressive, sending the three girls into elimination.	1,469,000	2nd	6th
20/04-2	Monday 23 May 2011	Pressure Test 2 – Chelsea, Rachel and Ellie had to recreate an Australian-ised pork with fried rice, without the aid of a recipe. Relying on their food knowledge proved a challenge for the three girls, as the wrong cuts of meat were chosen, sauces were unbalanced, and meat was overcooked. The judges decision proved difficult as Chelsea was found to have the best rice, Ellie the best meat, and Rachel the best sauce. Ultimately, Chelsea's lack of sauce, tough meat and over-reliance on outside help saw her eliminated from the competition.	1,514,000	1st	4th
21/04-3	Tuesday 24 May 2011	Immunity Challenge 3 – Adam D'Sylva beat Craig, Peter and Sun (27-21)	1,295,000	5th	12th
22/04-4	Wednesday 25 May 2011	Offsite Challenge 3 – Teams were tasked with catering for a busy Sunday morning at Cronulla Beach for hungry nippers and their families, providing a sausages sizzle and gelato. Two from each team had spent the night making three flavours of gelato each, while the rest of the team prepared their hand-made sausages. Hayden, being a lifeguard, attempted to boost sales by charming the crowds toward the Blue Team, sparking strong rivalry between the teams. By providing a 'breakfast sausage,' Michael's Red Team managed to start selling over an hour before Craig's Blue Team. As it came down to how much money the teams made, the Blue Team's slow start cost them in the end with earning $2,114 over the Red Team's $2,434, sending them into elimination.	1,236,000	6th	17th
23/04-5	Thursday 26 May 2011	Elimination Challenge 3 – The Blue Team were faced with a pastry skills based challenge; they needed to prepare a sponge, a custard, a toffee and finally a ganache. They were not allowed to move on to the custard until they had finished the preparation of their sponge, and so on through the stages, before combining all four elements into their own dessert creation. Sun, Peter and Kumar had serious problems with each of their elements, but it was Cleo's mistake of starting her ganache before completely finishing her toffee that forced the judges to eliminate her.	1,464,000	1st	8th
24/04-6	Friday 27 May 2011	MasterClass 4	921,000	6th	32nd
Week 5 (Western Australia Week)
25/05-1	Sunday 29 May 2011	Sunday Challenge 3 – Contestants were whisked away to Western Australia and the Sunrise Dam Gold Mine for a team challenge like no other: catering for 450 hungry workers over a 24 hours and three courses. Early on, Jay and Dani's leadership of the Blue Team proved a little shaky, as poor rostering lead to short staffing, and a lack of preparation meant they were still planning their breakfast menu just before service started. Each team had its share of mishaps during the challenge, and although the Blue Team served up uncooked fish and deep-fried bacon, they managed to win the challenge by a small margin (685 votes to Danielle and Kate's Red's 665), leaving the Red Team with a second shift in the Mine's kitchen.	1,511,000	4th	8th
26/05-2	Monday 30 May 2011	W.A. Invention Test – As winners of the Team Challenge, the Blue Team competed against each other at Margaret River's Clairault Winery for a double chance at immunity: to cook off in the Immunity Challenge and be exempt from the next elimination challenge in the MasterChef kitchen. The ten contestants faced an Invention Test, each cooking a different meat picked at random and using a range of organic ingredients from chef Jake Drachenberg's kitchen garden. In the end, Michael and Jay impressed the judges the most, and it was Jay's skillful technique when cooking the Western Australian crustacean marron that sent him into the Immunity Challenge.	1,577,000	1st	5th
27/05-3	Tuesday 31 May 2011	Immunity Challenge 4 – Tony Howell beat Jay (23-22)	1,502,000	2nd	9th
28/05-4	Wednesday 1 June 2011	"Tinned and Frozen Challenge" – Contestants (all except Jay who had immunity) were given 90 minutes, full run of the pantry and the freedom to cook what they wanted, but with one twist: the only ingredients available to them were tinned and frozen produce. This confused a number of contestants who struggled to produce smart, tasty dishes within the limits of the challenge. Many also rose to the challenge, producing a Top 5 and giving winners Billy and Shannon a special reward and private MasterClass. However, Andrew and Kumar's dishes did not impress and landed them in an Elimination Challenge.	1,602,000	1st	4th
29/05-5	Thursday 2 June 2011	Elimination Challenge 4 – Andrew and Kumar faced a "Fix that Dish" Challenge; they had eight steps each to fix a Massaman curry. Both contestants choice of ingredients surprised and confused both judges and other contestants, as neither Andrew or Kumar picked peanuts or potatoes, two key ingredients in the traditional dish. In the end, the judges faced a tough decision as neither dish was considered close enough to an actual Massaman curry. However, Kumar's tenderer meat and decision to add cashews gave his dish a slight edge over Andrew's, sending Andrew home.	1,532,000	1st	7th
30/05-6	Friday 3 June 2011	MasterClass 5	860,000	7th	40th
Week 6
31/06-1	Sunday 5 June 2011	Sunday Challenge 4 – In a "Super Invention Test" with a Spanish theme, contestants were given the choice of three pairs of core ingredients: lamb and anchovies, orange and sherry, or squid and chorizo. The "super" twist of the challenge came when, after each contestant had picked their 15 additional ingredients, the judges redistributed each contestants set of ingredients, forcing them to show their flexibility in the kitchen. Danielle beat out Arena, Shannon and Michael for top spot, while some disastrous efforts dropped Jay, Dani and Ellie into the Bottom 3.	1,445,000	5th	9th
32/06-2	Monday 6 June 2011	Pressure Test 3 – Jay, Dani and Ellie faced a Pressure Test set by Dan Hong, head chef at Ms G restaurant: pandan chiffon cake with black sesame icecream and coconut tapioca. All three contestants struggled with technical elements of the dish, but it was especially Jay whose instinctive style of cooking did not gel with the precise nature of the dish. While Dani had tapioca "like chalk," and Ellie had elements that were below standard, it was Jay's uneven dish with sugary praline that led to a tearful elimination.	1,637,000	1st	3rd
33/06-3	Tuesday 7 June 2011	Immunity Challenge 5 – Thorsten Schmidt beat Danielle (26-21)	1,439,000	3rd	10th
34/06-4	Wednesday 8 June 2011	Offsite Challenge 4 – In the first ever Tag-team Challenge, teams were asked to prepare six dishes with only one team member cooking at any one time. Additionally, only the first to cook would be allowed to view the recipe, with a one-minute change-over period to relay information about the dishes. Communication breakdowns brought both teams problems and left some group members relying only on instinct. Surprise guest judge Nigella Lawson (whose recipes contestants were making) praised both teams efforts; especially Alana's Red Team's game pie and velvet cupcakes and Adam's Blue Team's roast lamb and devil's food cake. In the end though it was the Blue Team's better overall performance which gave them the three judges votes, sending the Red Team to elimination.	1,633,000	1st	4th
35/06-5	Thursday 9 June 2011	Elimination Challenge 5 – Shannon and Arena put themselves forward as the two weakest performers from the Red Team and faced off in a Pressure Test. They were given a core ingredient (one whole chicken) and complete freedom of choice to prepare as many dishes as they would like in 75 minutes. Each contestant struggled with the pressure of the challenge, both running out of time and presenting incomplete dishes. The judges praised Shannon's steamed chicken breast and Arena's chicken soup, but ultimately the overall quality of Arena's dishes did not match Shannon's and she was eliminated.	1,564,000	1st	5th
36/06-6	Friday 10 June 2011	MasterClass 6	858,000	7th	41st
Week 7
37/07-1	Sunday 12 June 2011	QANTAS Fine Dining Challenge – Contestants were paired up and asked to prepare one of eight courses of Neil Perry's QANTAS First Class menu. They were given 60 minutes of mise en place, followed by 20 minutes to cook, plate and serve one course at a time to 27 special guests, including world class chefs Thomas Keller and Andoni Adruiz. The extreme pressure of the challenge led to some problems especially in the plating stage, with most teams struggling with presentation. Ultimately, it was Kate and Danielle's poached snapper that the judges deemed most impressive, rewarding them with the chance to cook alongside Thomas and Andoni at a dinner for the Starlight Children's Foundation, and Kate a shot at immunity. However, it was Rachel and Craig whose tart lacked flavour and Michael and Shannon whose pudding was too dense who were deemed least impressive, landing them in the Bottom 4.	1,349,000	4th	13th
38/07-2	Monday 13 June 2011	Pressure Test 4 – Craig, Michael, Shannon and Rachel faced a Heston Blumenthal creation: a seemingly simple burger with chips and milkshake. But true to his molecular gastronomy style the dish was a complex combination of cooking styles, including a milkshake inspired by a personal memory. Michael's dish overall impressed, especially with his lime shake reminiscent of his now-deceased father, and Craig also impressed with his extremely thick chocolate milkshake. But despite having "the best bun of the lot" according to Heston, Rachel's overcooked meat and rushed milkshake lead to her elimination.	1,909,000	1st	2nd
39/07-3	Tuesday 14 June 2011	Immunity Challenge 6 – Darren Purchese beat Kate (26-24)	1,559,000	2nd	6th
40/07-4	Wednesday 15 June 2011	Offsite Challenge 5 – In this "sustainable food challenge," contestants prepared a lunch service at the Greenhouse "pop up" restaurant in Sydney under the guidance of chef Matt Stone, with an emphasis on minimising waste. Their guests (including famous chefs and sustainable food experts) would vote for their favourite team, with the two best performers from the winning team experiencing a shift in Gary Mehigan's restaurant Fenix. Blue Team members questioned Sun's leadership as a lack of organisation slowed service down considerably. In the end, the Blue Team were commended for their sustainable menu and some excellent dishes, including Alana's dessert and Hayden's prawns. While Craig's Red Team worked well in the kitchen, their wastage was significant and they suffered from a poor dessert. The Blue Team won in a landslide (45-21), even without the bonus 10 votes they received for their minimal waste, with Alana and Hayden receiving the reward. The entire Red Team fell into an Elimination Challenge.	1,607,000	2nd	5th
41/07-5	Thursday 16 June 2011	Elimination Challenge 6 – The losing team faced a three-round elimination challenge, where they had 15 minutes and limited ingredients to produce their dish. Billy, Danielle and Ellie created the best dishes of the first round using only three ingredients, with Dani and Michael escaping elimination in the second round with dishes made from only six ingredients. In the final round, Craig and Shannon both impressed with their two very different dishes; the judges naming them two of the competitions best. The quality of Shannon's was judged as slightly below Craig's sealing her elimination from the competition.	1,615,000	1st	4th
42/07-6	Friday 17 June 2011	MasterClass 7	928,000	5th	32nd
Week 8
43/08-1	Sunday 19 June 2011	Sunday Challenge 6 – In this Korean-inspired "Invention Box" challenge set by Korean-American top chef David Chang, contestants were faced with a range of exotic Korean ingredients and a randomly selected protein. Many contestants floundered with such unknown ingredients, but Dani, Hayden and Peter impressed with their inventiveness, creativity and tasty Korean flavours. In the end, Hayden was crowned the winner of the challenge, earning him a spot in the Immunity Challenge, and immunity from the Team Challenge. Danielle, Michael, Adam and Ellie (who did not compete due to sickness and received an automatic bottom spot) were left as the Bottom 4.	1,615,000	2nd	6th
44/08-2	Monday 20 June 2011	Pressure Test 5 – Danielle, Michael, Adam and Ellie faced a Pressure Test set by George's mother Mary Calombaris: cooking 4 traditional Greek-Cypriotic dishes. Contestants struggled to plate up each dish in the 90 minutes provided, with some receiving a helping hand from Mary herself. Ellie and Michael dishes were the two best received, while Adam and Danielle's were plagued with errors including raw pastry and overly salty, garlicky and oily elements. Despite performing the worst, Danielle was saved from elimination when Adam, realising that he did not have the same passion for the food industry as his competitors, withdrew from the competition.	1,681,000	1st	4th
45/08-3	Tuesday 21 June 2011	Immunity Challenge 7 – Vincent Gadan beat Hayden (21-19)	1,597,000	2nd	7th
46/08-4	Wednesday 22 June 2011	Offsite Challenge 6 – Teams (excluding Hayden, who had immunity) were taken to Westfield Sydney, where they were asked to prepare some simple dishes (such as burger and fries, pizza, cake and pastry) with one twist: each dish had specific dietary restrictions (such as lactose free, low salt or vegan). Contestants from each team were paired off and given 60 minutes to prepare their dish, with the best dish receiving a vote from the judges. Many contestants failed to fit the brief of the challenge and lost votes accordingly, and despite two disastrous dishes it was the Blue Team's overall performance that won them the challenge, sending the entire Red Team to elimination.	1,773,000	1st	1st
47/08-5	Thursday 23 June 2011	Elimination Challenge 7 – The Red Team faced an "In-the-round" challenge with two stages: three contestants at a time would prepare a savoury dish in 15 minutes with the least impressive from each group going into the final elimination round cooking a sweet dish in 30 minutes. Craig's overcooked quail breast and Alana's raw lamb led them to the final round, where it was Craig's undercooked apple fritters that led to his elimination.	1,511,000	1st	10th
48/08-6	Friday 24 June 2011	MasterClass 8	978,000	5th	27th
Week 9
49/09-1	Sunday 26 June 2011	Sunday Challenge 7 – The Top 12 contestants were tasked with preparing lunch for 200 hungry farmers and their families when they travelled into the NSW country to Matt Moran's dad's lamb farm. They had four hours to prepare any dish they wanted under the restrictions of an outdoor fire and with lamb as their only protein, their guests voting for their favourite dish. Michael's decision to ignore the lamb and cook two sweet dishes confused the judges but led him to second place, behind winner Billy, whose hearty and spicy Lamb Curry and sweet Rocky Road were perfect for the cold and wet weather and proved popular with adults and children alike. Danielle, Ellie and Peter's uneven and unattractive dishes landed them in the Bottom 3, to face elimination.	1,604,000	3rd	7th
50/09-2	Monday 27 June 2011	Pressure Test 6 – Ellie, Danielle and Peter were set a tough test by chef Matthew Kemp: to re-invent the classic French dish Duck à l'orange, with no aid of a recipe. Despite initially struggling for ideas and burning her hand, Ellie's dish universally impressed the judges. And while Peter was criticised for not being inventive enough, it was Danielle's cold pasta dish missing the orange flavours that led to her elimination.	1,578,000	1st	6th
51/09-3	Tuesday 28 June 2011	Immunity Challenge 8 – Merle Parrish (Country Women's Association) beat Billy (24-21)	1,688,000	1st	3rd
52/09-4	Wednesday 29 June 2011	Offsite Challenge 7 – Teams were faced with their first catering jobs: The Blue Team, a corporate 3-course lunch for 12, and the Red Team, a 21st birthday for 50 guests. The Blue Team, led by Peter, worked well in the kitchen and were commended for the quality of their dishes, while the Red Team, led by Ellie, had "kitchen chaos" as forgotten ingredients delayed preparations, and were criticised for their decision to prepare a rabbit terrine dish which did not involve any cooking. Ultimately Blue failed to deliver on the client's brief: a light lunch delivered within a strict time limit, while Red impressed with their menu and the interactive element to their birthday cake, filling the client's brief. The Red Team members secured their places in the Top 10; despite being out-cooked by the Blue Team they delivered what the client wanted, leading the Blue Team to elimination.	1,693,000	1st	1st
53/09-5	Thursday 30 June 2011	Elimination Challenge 8 – The Blue Team (minus Hayden, who chose to use his immunity pin) were faced with two challenges, a Taste Test and an Invention Test. Michael, Peter, Billy and Kumar were given three minutes to each taste and name as many of the ingredients of a terrine, blind-folded. Those they guessed correctly would be the only ingredients they would have to cook with in the 40-minute Invention Test. It came down to Michael (who had 11 ingredients, the most) and Kumar (with the fewest at four ingredients) and it was the latter's lack of available ingredients that sealed his fate.	1,532,000	1st	9th
54/09-6	Friday 1 July 2011	MasterClass 9	837,000	8th	36th
Week 10
55/10-1	Sunday 3 July 2011	Sunday Challenge 8 – In the first Sunday Challenge in the Top 10, the contestants were faced with a Mystery Box and an Invention Test. The winner of the steamed pudding-themed Mystery Box challenge was Kate with a white chocolate and raspberry pudding with Kahlua ice cream, who then picked figs as the core ingredient for the Middle Eastern-themed Invention Test. Peter, Michael and Dani were selected as the top three and in the end it was Dani who prevailed with her idea of a 'frozen baklava' (fig and pistachio ice cream between sheets of filo pastry), especially impressing guest chef Shane Delia. As winner of this challenge, besides the chance to win immunity, Dani received an "unparalleled" advantage going into the next week. Hayden, Billy and Mat were named the bottom three and were sent into an Elimination Challenge.	1,560,000	3rd	8th
56/10-2	Monday 4 July 2011	Pressure Test 7 – Mat, Billy and Hayden faced off in a Pressure Test, in which they had to recreate a Salt-crusted Guinea Fowl with a Mushroom Duxelle and a Thyme Jus, with two complementary side dishes of their own choosing. Mat showed most competency overall despite a burnt hand, only slightly overcooking the guinea fowl. Despite his perfectly cooked guinea fowl and excellent gratin dauphinois side dish, it was Billy's raw beetroot salad and "rubbish" jus that saw him eliminated from the competition.	1,590,000	1st	5th
57/10-3	Tuesday 5 July 2011	Immunity Challenge 9 – Dani beat Alessandro Pavoni (22-22) (Note: Despite receiving the same number of points from the judges, Dani won the challenge as Pavoni failed to beat her.)	1,500,000	1st	11th
58/10-4	Wednesday 6 July 2011	Offsite Challenge 8 – After Mat's removal from the competition for having an unauthorised mobile phone, Billy returned to the house. Teams were tasked with providing a three-course lunch service at the Merivale Felix restaurant in Sydney, under the scrutiny of iconic British chef Marco Pierre White. The Blue Team (which Dani was able to hand-pick due to her Sunday Challenge win) chose to prepare a French menu for 30 French expats, leaving the Red Team (with Alana as captain) with a British menu for British expats. Both teams struggled with the pressures of a professional kitchen, but it was the Blue Team that proved the most disorganised, especially during preparation time and the start of service. Despite surpassing the Red Team by dessert and receiving high praise from the judges for the quality of their dishes, their overall performance saw them going into elimination.	1,726,000	2nd	2nd
59/10-5	Thursday 7 July 2011	Elimination Challenge 9 – After Dani chose to use her immunity pin, Michael, Hayden, Kate and Peter faced a three-round elimination challenge, with the best performer in each round declared safe. In the first round, they were given 15 minutes to prepare Vietnamese Rice Paper Rolls with a dipping sauce, testing their knife skills and ability to balance flavours. Michael's technical precision led him to be the first deemed safe from elimination. In the second round, they had to trim, French, truss and cook a rib-eye steak to medium rare in 25 minutes. Hayden's decision to wrap his frenched bone in foil gave him the slightest edge over Peter, sealing his place in the top 8. In the final round, Peter and Kate had 60 minutes to make an apple pie with custard. Despite wholly positive reactions to both pies, it was Peter's slightly undercooked pastry that sent him home.	1,638,000	1st	3rd
60/10-6	Friday 8 July 2011	MasterClass 10	963,000	6th	33rd
Week 11 (New York Week)
61/11-1	Sunday 10 July 2011	Sunday Challenge 9 – In their first challenge in New York, contestants were each sent to a different part of the city (such as Chinatown, The Bronx and Brooklyn) to get inspiration for a restaurant-quality dish. The best dish would earn its maker an advantage at the next challenge with the worst performer going straight into lockdown to face elimination later in the week. The top three were Michael, Billy and Alana, with Michael's evocation of 'street food' with a Mexican taco landing him the win. Dani and Sun were the least impressive, and it was Sun's flawed honey cake invention that sent her into lockdown facing elimination.	1,615,000	1st	4th
62/11-2	Monday 11 July 2011	United Nations Challenge – In the General Assembly Hall of the United Nations, the contestants were tasked with preparing canapés for a V.I.P. event hosted by the Australian mission to the U.N. The winning dish would be determined by guests' votes (representatives of all 192 member states), earning its maker a chance at immunity, while the worst performer would face lockdown and a spot in the elimination challenge. As winner of the Sunday Challenge, Michael had access to each recipe and picked each contestant's dish, his decisions not making him popular. Hayden and Ellie's dishes received the most votes and it was Ellie's duck canapé that earned her the win. Dani and Billy's dishes were the least popular, with Billy's bland vichyssoise receiving the fewest votes and leaving him facing elimination.	1,758,000	1st	2nd
63/11-3	Tuesday 12 July 2011	Immunity Challenge 10 – Ellie beat Cesare Casella (24-22)	1,612,000	2nd	5th
64/11-4	Wednesday 13 July 2011	Ultimate Dinner Party Challenge – Teams had 3.5 hours to race from Times Square to the Four Seasons Restaurant to each cook one course for "the ultimate dinner party". After choosing their dish, they collected the recipe and ingredients for the dishes from a famous restaurant in New York City. Alana and Ellie, despite struggling with navigation and arriving in the kitchen last, delivered the dish of the day. Hayden and Dani could not hold onto their advantage in arriving first, sending them into the elimination challenge.	1,620,000	1st	3rd
65/11-5	Thursday 14 July 2011	Elimination Challenge 10 – Sun, Dani, Hayden and Billy were tasked with cooking traditional soul food under the scrutiny of three generations of the Woods family, of the world-famous Sylvia's Restaurant of Harlem. Each contestant had to prepare the restaurant's signature dishes of BBQ Ribs, Fried Chicken and Macaroni 'n' Cheese, plus a different side dish. Billy was the best performer of the day, receiving positive comments for all three dishes and his sides of black-eyed peas and collard greens. Sun was plagued by raw chicken and a bland side of Potato Salad, sealing her elimination.	1,609,000	1st	6th
66/11-6	Friday 15 July 2011	MasterClass 11	964,000	7th	30th
Week 12
67/12-1	Sunday 17 July 2011	Sunday Challenge 10 – Contestants each prepared one vegetarian course for the 14th Dalai Lama and his guests, four charity leaders. Under the guidance of guest chef and Buddhist Kylie Kwong, they had a strict three-hour deadline. Dani beat out Michael for the win, with a well received Sri Lankan Vegetarian Curry. Ellie, Billy and Kate's dishes "lacked punch," sending them into a Pressure Test to face elimination.	1,725,000	1st	2nd
68/12-2	Monday 18 July 2011	Pressure Test 8 – After Ellie decided to use her immunity pin, Billy and Kate had two hours to recreate Katrina Kanetani's 'Autumn' dessert plate. Both contestants, though strong in desserts, struggled with multiple elements of the dish. In the end, Kate was praised for her strong flavours, while Billy's dish showed technical precision and flair; both dishes had some technical errors. The judges ultimately decided that Kate's dish was more refined, eliminating Billy for the second and last time.	1,650,000	1st	3rd
69/12-3	Tuesday 19 July 2011	Immunity Challenge 11 – Dani beat Eamon Sullivan (25-24)	1,468,000	3rd	9th
70/12-4	Wednesday 20 July 2011	QANTAS First Lounge Challenge – In the first part of the challenge, team captains Hayden and Alana faced a mini Mystery Box, with the winner receiving an advantage for their team in the second part of the challenge. Alana won for the Red Team, gaining them the advantage as teams took over the QANTAS First Lounge kitchen at Sydney Airport. They took the first 90-minute shift, taking over the service from professional chefs with all prep work done and a clean kitchen, followed by the Blue Team. Overall, Red performed well, delivering two outstanding dishes but struggling with time management and a "disastrous" Club Sandwich (the lounge's signature dish). Despite all of Blue's dishes being on time and producing an excellent Club Sandwich, it was their fish, both raw and burnt, that lost them the challenge.	1,533,000	1st	8th
71/12-5	Thursday 21 July 2011	Elimination Challenge 11 – Hayden, Kate and Michael had 90 minutes and an open pantry to cook a dish that demonstrated skills acquired throughout the competition. Each contestant impressed the judges with their dish, with only minor flaws. Kate's Stuffed Squab with Parsnip Purée and Jus Gras, was perfectly cooked but criticised for a slightly fibrous purée. Michael wowed the judges with his Sous-vide Chicken with Crispy Chicken Skin, Pea Purée and Jus Gras, only slightly overcooking the end of the breast. Hayden's Sesame-encrusted Coral Trout with Tapioca Pearls and Garlic Wasabi Cream was praised for its complex flavour combinations, but a garnish of pickled daikon was so salty that Gary deemed it "almost inedible". This small mistake was enough to seal Hayden's elimination for the competition.	1,605,000	1st	4th
72/12-6	Friday 22 July 2011	MasterClass 12	770,000	11th	52nd
Week 13 (Semi-Finals Week)
73/13-1	Sunday 24 July 2011	Sunday Challenge 11 – In a Mystery Box Challenge without elimination, the top 5 picked each other's ingredients as per the Secret Santa method. The winner would earn the final chance to cook for immunity and a spread on their winning recipe in Taste magazine. Michael and Alana were the top two, but Michael's Panna Cotta with Roasted Rhubarb and Orange & Honey Syrup triumphed in the end, and the recipe was subsequently published in Taste.	1,734,000	2nd	3rd
74/13-2	Monday 25 July 2011	Family Dinner Challenge – In a second challenge without elimination, contestants cooked ten servings of a single dish of their choosing for the judges, who were joined by all the contestants' families. Alana's Pancake Stack met with ravings from the judges: she was rewarded a night at home with her family in Brisbane, accompanied by a four-course dinner cooked by Gary and George along with two sous-chefs from their restaurants, and the floor run by Matt Preston as maître d'.	1,674,000	1st	4th
75/13-3	Tuesday 26 July 2011	Immunity Challenge 12 – Teage Ezard beat Michael (26-25)	1,356,000	3rd	12th
76/13-4	Wednesday 27 July 2011	Worst Nightmare Challenge – The top 5 were surprised by George in the early morning as he showed up at the house with three guest chefs, who each brought one unusual core ingredient of their own choosing. The contestants were given two hours of mise en place and then 10 minutes to plate up during service. Although her Caramelised Pumpkin Cake was a little dense for some judges, it was enough to land Kate the win and a one-on-one MasterClass with Matt Moran. Michael's Sea Urchin with Angel Hair Pasta suffered from claggy pasta, but his respect for the core ingredient was enough to land him the second spot in Finals Week. Dani and Ellie were the bottom two: Dani's Liquorice Ice Cream lacked in presentation and concept and Ellie's Lobster Salad with Salsify Purée had the core ingredient of salsify playing second fiddle. Alana landed in the middle, but she was informed that she would be up for elimination if Dani decided to use her immunity pin.	1,675,000	1st	5th
77/13-5	Thursday 28 July 2011	Elimination Challenge 12 – Dani chose to use her immunity pin, sending Alana into the Elimination Challenge against Ellie. They faced a "Fix Your Biggest Stuff-up" Challenge in which they had to re-invent a bad dish they cooked earlier in the competition. For Ellie it was a dish from episode 31 and for Alana it was both her dishes from episode 47. Ellie got 75 minutes like in the original challenge, Alana only got 45. Ellie left the capsicums out of her dish and turned it into a dessert, while Alana decided only to improve the weak points of the original dishes, being raw lamb and crunchy, undercooked pear. Ultimately, Alana's decision to leave the fat on her lamb cutlets did not go well with the judges, but her Poached Pear dessert was deemed faultless. Ellie's eggy Crème Caramel and the pith left on the orange wedges in her Citrus Salad were enough to lead to a teary elimination.	1,528,000	1st	8th
78/13-6	Friday 29 July 2011	MasterClass 13	910,000	7th	39th
Week 14 (Finals Week)
79/14-1	Sunday 31 July 2011	Sunday Challenge 12 – In the first challenge of Finals Week, again without elimination, contestants were to develop a recipe for a single dish, which was then styled and photographed as if designed for their personal cookbook. The recipes would then be tested by four contestants who had to follow the recipe to the letter. They were paired up with a contestant in the studio and had to cook the dish along with them within 90 minutes, so their version of the dish could be judged by how much it tasted like the contestants' original recipes. All contestants ran into trouble with mistakes in their recipes or processes that proved too complicated for contestants, except for winner Michael, who had written a recipe that was so easy to follow that Sue, the contestant assigned to him, even managed to cook a better version of his dish according to Matt Preston.	1,731,000	1st	4th
80/14-2	Monday 1 August 2011	Pressure Test 9 – The top 4 were given 2 hours and 15 minutes to reproduce Maggie Beer's Chook Terrine with various accompaniments. All contestants struggled with the high level of technicality in the dish and despite each of them showing competence in the condiments and general plating, it was four undercooked terrines that sealed everyone's fate, as every contestant was sent into an elimination challenge.	1,581,000	1st	8th
81/14-3	Tuesday 2 August 2011	Elimination Challenge 13 – Contestants were given three hours to cook three dishes that reflected the story of their life. Kate and Alana were the two best overall performers, with stunning desserts and very little substantial criticism on any of their dishes. Both Michael and Dani were criticised on some points, each overall only getting good comments on one of their three dishes. Despite Michael's overly sweet and acidic caper mayonnaise that tasted "like the beginning of a lemon curd" and a "hmm" duck dish, it was Dani's thick and underseasoned Sweetcorn Soup, poor Crab Wontons and grainy, icy Sesame Ice Cream that sent her packing.	1,571,000	3rd	9th
82/14-4	Wednesday 3 August 2011	Three Hat Challenge – The top three were each sent to a different three hat establishment where they each designed a dish to fit on the menu of their assigned restaurant. They then had to cook the dish during lunch service, where Matt Preston joined by two of his fellow food critics would taste the dish and decide if it fitted in with the restaurant's menu, scrutinizing both flavour and presentation. Michael's main proved the most successful, guaranteeing him a spot in the grand finale. Although Kate came very close, her dessert fell just short of the mark, landing her in a Pressure Test elimination against Alana, whose dish was judged the least impressive overall.	1,674,000	1st	7th
83/14-5	Thursday 4 August 2011	Pressure Test 10 – In a patented Adriano Zumbo superchallenge, Kate and Alana were given 4.5 hours to reproduce his "Fairytale House" dessert (a miniature gingerbread house with several candy and fruit decorations), with the last spot in the Grand Finale at stake. The challenge proved notoriously difficult indeed, but both contestants managed to plate up in the end. Despite setting herself back roughly 1.5 hours after burning her first batch of gingerbread, it was Kate that emerged victorious. Alana's skill shown in the preparation of the candies and other garnishes were ultimately not enough to make up for her burnt and overcooked gingerbread, leading to a teary elimination.	1,697,000	1st	6th
84/14-6	Friday 5 August 2011	MasterClass 14	1,169,000	2nd	22nd
Grand Finale
85/15-1	Sunday 7 August 2011	Grand Finale – Kate and Michael faced off in the Grand Finale, which consisted of three challenges: Mystery Box Race (20 points) – In the first challenge, the finalists were given 45 minutes to cook a single dish with the ingredients given to them in three separate Mystery Boxes. They were to choose their ingredients and complete the mise en place on that bench before moving on to the next. Once prepared, they could not return to a previous bench. Kate's Balmain Bug and Crab Remoulade Salad was liked by the judges for clean and subtle flavours, but the judges were not sure her bug was cooked enough. Michael's Steak and Oyster Pie was hailed for its flavour combination, but was let down by crunchy carrots. Kate's dish scored 15 out of a possible 20, Michael's scored 17, giving him an early lead.; Invention Test (40 points) – The second challenge was also dubbed the "Best Dish of Your Life" Challenge. Michael and Kate were given 2 hours and 15 minutes to cook a dish that demonstrated the skills they acquired throughout the competition. Michael's dish of Butter Poached Lobster with Fennel, Baby Leeks and Champagne Sauce was deemed simple by the judges and his last-minute decision to leave the roots on his leeks was not applauded. Kate's Sherry-Glazed Quail with Roast Garlic Custard, Asparagus Duxelle and Hazelnuts received good feedback overall, except for the slight smoky flavour in her custard, caused by the accidental burning of her bamboo steamer. Kate overtook Michael by scoring 36 points over his 31, giving them a respective total of 51 and 48 out of a possible 60.; Pressure Test (40 points) – The third and final challenge was set by René Redzepi, head chef at Noma in Copenhagen, crowned Best Restaurant in the World two years in a row. He brought in his "Snowman" dessert, an intricate three-layered dish. Kate lost a third of her carrot puree for her carrot sorbet in the process of draining the liquid out of it, Michael lost half. When it came to plating up, Kate's carrot sorbet showed some cracks and Michael's passion fruit mousse, which makes up the snowman's head, was a bit loose. The judges raved about both finalists' dishes and polished the plates clean.	2,334,000	2nd	2nd
86/15-2	Sunday 7 August 2011	The Winner Announced – Kate is declared the winner, scoring a total of 87 points over Michael's 82. Kate wins $100,000 in cash, a culinary scholarship and a cookbook deal with Random House. Runner-up Michael is offered a culinary apprenticeship by judge Gary Mehigan at his restaurant, Fenix.	2,740,000	1st	1st

Preceded by Junior MasterChef Australia (series 1)	MasterChef Australia series 1 May 2011 – 7 August 2011	Succeeded by Junior MasterChef Australia (series 2)
