= SSEC =

SSEC can refer to:

- IBM SSEC, an electromechanical calculator in the 1940s
- Sarnia Sports & Entertainment Centre, Ontario, Canada
- Secondary Schools Examinations Council, British body 1917-1963
- Shri Shankaracharya Engineering College, an engineering college in Chhattisgarh, India
- Society for the Study of Early Christianity at Macquarie University in Sydney, Australia
- South Seas Evangelical Church, in the Solomon Islands
- Space Science and Engineering Center at the University of Wisconsin–Madison, USA
- SSE Composite Index, Shanghai Stock Exchange index
- Stepping Stone Educational Centre in Port Harcourt, Rivers State
