= Alani (disambiguation) =

Alani may refer to:

- Alani (given name)
- Alani (dried fruit), Armenian traditional sweet.
- Alans, Ancient Iranian people of the North Caucasus.
- Melicope, the Hawaiian plant known as Alani
- Alani Nu, a female focused brand of functional drinks marketed by Celsius Holdings
