= Alannah =

Alannah is a feminine given name, a variant form of Alanna. Notable people with the name include:

- Alannah Beirne (born 1993), Irish fashion model and reality TV personality
- Alannah Currie (born 1957), New Zealand musician from the Thompson Twins
- Alannah Halay (born 1990), British composer and author
- Alannah Hill (born 1962), Australian fashion designer
- Alannah MacTiernan (born 1953), Australian politician
- Alannah Mathews (born 1999), Australian rhythmic gymnast
- Alannah Mikac (1989–1996), Australian girl whose death in the Port Arthur massacre inspired the founding of The Alannah and Madeline Foundation
- Alannah Myles (born 1958), Canadian singer-songwriter
- Alannah Weston (born 1972), Irish-Canadian businesswoman
- Alannah Yip (born 1993), Canadian sports climber

== See also ==
- Alanah
