= Leilani =

Leilani may refer to:

== People ==
- Leilani (singer) (born 1978), Leilani Sen, English pop singer
- Leilani Correa (born 2001), American basketball player
- Leilani Bishop (born 1976), American model
- Leilani Dowding (born 1980), English model
- Leilani Farha, Canadian lawyer and activist
- Leilani Jones (born 1957), American actress
- Leilani Kai (born 1960), retired professional wrestler
- Melissa Leilani Larson, American playwright
- Leilani Latu (born 1993), Australian rugby league footballer
- Leilani Mitchell (born 1985), American-Australian basketball player
- Leilani Munter (born 1974), American NASCAR driver
- Leilani Reklai (born 1966), Palauan politician
- Leilani Rorani (born 1974), New Zealand squash player
- Leilani Sarelle (born 1966), American actress
- Raven Leilani (born 1990), American author

== Arts, entertainment, and media ==
=== Films ===
- Leilani (film), a 1953 Indonesian film starring Awaludin
- The Sterilization of Leilani Muir (1996), a documentary directed by Glynis Whiting

=== Music ===
- "Leilani" (song), the debut single released by Australian rock group Hoodoo Gurus in 1982
- "Sweet Leilani", a song by Harry Owens, popularized by Bing Crosby in the film Waikiki Wedding

== Other uses ==
- Leilani (given name)
- Leilani (horse), 1975 Australian Champion Racehorse of the Year
- Leilani Estates, Hawaii, United States of America
- Lilani, name
