= Alani (given name) =

- Gender: Unisex

Origin
- Origin: English, Hawaiian, Yoruba
- Meaning: English variant of Alan or Alanna, Hawaiian orange, Yoruba peaceful or "one we survived to have."

Other names
- See also: Alanni

Alani is a name with multiple, unrelated origins from different cultures. It is a Hawaiian name meaning orange. It might be considered a modern English variant of the names Alan or Alanna. The popularity of the name coincides with the popularity of other names of Hawaiian origin such as Leilani or modern, created names using the fashionable suffix -lani, which means sky or heaven in Hawaiian. Alani or Àlàní is also a Yoruba masculine name in use in Nigeria. One source gives its meaning as peaceful. One source states it means "one we survived to have".

== Popularity ==
Alani has been among the top one thousand names given to girls in the United States since 2003 and among the top two hundred fifty names for American girls since 2020. The variant spelling Alanni is also in use.

== People ==
- Ipoola Alani Akinrinade (born 1939), retired Nigerian Army military leader
- Alani Bankole (born 1941), Nigerian Egba businessman and chieftain
- Alani Fua (born 1992), American retired football linebacker

=== Fictional characters ===
- Alani Marcus, a character in I Love LA
- Alani Ryan (Loa), Marvel Comics character
