= Alanah =

Alanah is a feminine given name, a variant form of Alanna. Notable people with the name include:

- Alanah Bloor (born 1999), English actress
- Alanah Pearce (born 1993), Australian video game writer and journalist
- Alanah Woody (1956–2007), American archeologist and anthropologist

== See also ==
- Alannah
