= Dan Churchill =

Australian chef (born 1989)

Daniel Churchill (born 24 July 1989, in Sydney) is an Australian chef, best known for his appearance on the 5th series of MasterChef Australia in 2013, placing 8th, and as a co-presenter of Surfing the Menu: The Next Generation (2016). He was included on the Forbes 30 Under 30 Food list in 2019 as the cofounder of New York City café, Charley St. He is also known for his two cookbooks, DudeFood: A Guy's Guide to Cooking Kick-Ass Food (2015) and Surfing the Menu (2016) co-authored with Hayden Quinn. A graduate of the University of Technology Sydney and Edith Cowan University, he worked with Chris Hemsworth on the latter's fitness app, Centr.
