= Alaina =

Alaina is a feminine given name, the feminine variant of Alain or an alternative version of Alanna. Notable people with the name include:

- Alaina Bergsma (born 1990), American volleyball
- Alaina Burnett (born 1977), Canadian voice actor
- Alaina Capri (born 1939), American actress
- Alaina Coates (born 1995), American basketball player
- Alaina Huffman (born 1980), also known as Alaina Kalanj, Canadian film and television actress
- Alaina Johnson (born 1990), American artistic gymnast
- Alaina Kwan (born 1998), American artistic gymnast
- Alaina Lockhart (born 1974), Canadian politician
- Alaina Petty (2003–2018), one of the 17 victims who was killed in the Stoneman Douglas High School shooting
- Alaina Reed Hall (1946–2009), American actress
- Alaina B. Teplitz (born 1969), American politician
- Alaina Williams (born 1990), American trampoline gymnast

== See also ==
- Alanna
- Elaine (given name)
