= Hayden Quinn =

Australian chef and TV personality (born 1986)

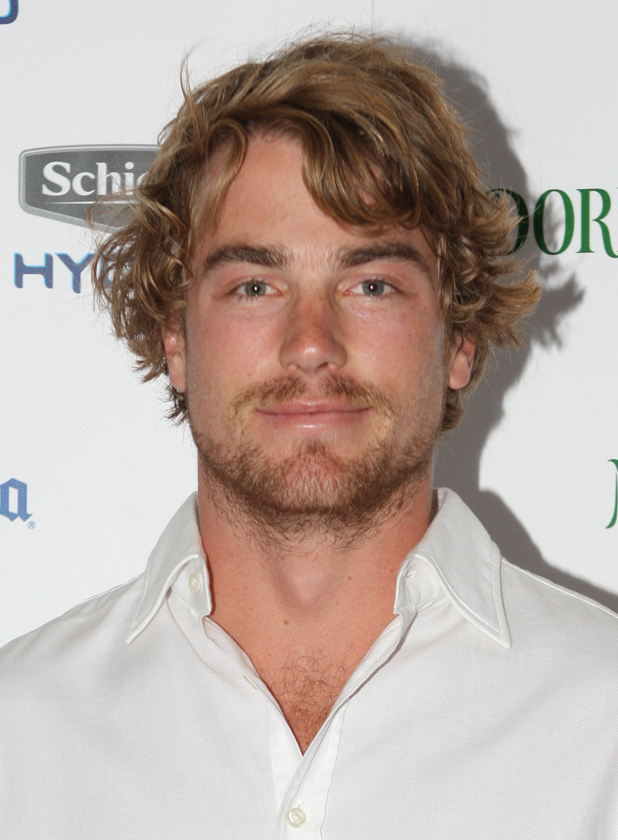
- Quinn in 2012
- Born: 24 September 1986 (age 39); Sydney, Australia
- Education: Bachelor of Science in Marine Biology
- Spouse: Jax Raynor
- Culinary career
- Television shows: The Dinner Project; Hayden Quinn South Africa; Surfing the Menu: The Next Generation; Family Food Fight (Australia); Taste of Australia with Hayden Quinn
- Website: www.haydenquinn.com.au

Hayden Quinn is an Australian cook, surfer, lifeguard, marine biologist, food writer and TV personality.

== Career ==
Quinn has published a number of cookbooks, served as a judge on a reality TV cooking show, hosted his own cooking and travel shows, and started several businesses.

=== MasterChef Australia ===
Quinn first came to national attention during his participation in MasterChef Australia. He appeared on Series 3 in 2011 where he finished sixth. He then appeared on MasterChef Australia All-Stars in 2012, where he was eliminated in the 10th round. He appeared again in MasterChef Australia: Back to Win in 2020, where he was eliminated in the fifth week.

=== Taste of Australia ===
Since 2020, Quinn has presented, written and executive produced eight seasons of Taste of Australia with Hayden Quinn, which is produced by Boomtown Pictures. During each episode, Quinn visits local and native growers, farmers, food producers, fishers, wineries, artisans and small food companies, including indigenous Australians, often mucking-in, and cooks a dish outdoors using local food, usually on a portable Weber barbecue. The series tells "a story of where our food comes from here in Australia." The series has visited communities all over Australia. He plans to do 10 seasons of Taste of Australia. Some of the later episodes refer to Our Cow, a direct-to-consumer meat subscription company.

=== Other television ===
Quinn hosted the six-part The Dinner Project on Foxtel's LifeStyle Food during 2014. He lived with six families in Australia and developed simple and accessible meal plans that highlighted the skills, budget, time, knowledge, nutrition and ideas necessary to eat healthy food.

Quinn was the host of the 13-part series South African television program Hayden Quinn South Africa which aired there in 2014 on SABC 3. He toured food producers and conservation projects across the country, highlighting sustainable farming or fishing practices, environmental stewardship and animal welfare, and cooked with local foodies.

He and Dan Churchill co-hosted the 13-part series Surfing the Menu - Next Generation in 2016. They travelled around the country, combining their love of surfing and of food. This was a follow-up to the earlier Surfing the Menu presented by Curtis Stone and Ben O'Donoghue.

In 2017, Quinn was a judge on Season 1 of the Nine Network reality cooking program Family Food Fight (Australia).

In 2024, Quinn participated in Dancing with the Stars (Australia) with professional partner Lily Cornish. He appeared on series 21 in 2024 where he was eliminated second.

=== Writing ===
Quinn has written two printed cookbooks: Dish It Up in 2013 and Surfing the Menu (with Dan Churchill) in 2016. He has also written two e-cookbooks: Hayden Cooks Summer and Hayden Cooks with Friends.

He contributes recipes and travel stories to delicious magazine and to taste.com.au.

Quinn has written illustrated travel guides to five places in Australia: (Barossa Valley, Bruny Island, Darwin, Hobart and Mudgee), and five international destinations: (Kyoto, New York City, San Francisco, Singapore and Tokyo).

=== Podcast ===
Quinn hosted a podcast, The Roving Mic, in 2018-2019, recorded outdoors off the beaten track.

=== Entrepreneurship ===
Quinn has been a partner in Kooks Wines, a "social winery" where 50% of profits go to charitable causes, since 2013.

Since 2014, Quinn has been co-owner with Lewis McLean and Sam Whittaker of The Cube Gym, located in Brookvale in the Northern Beaches of Sydney. The Cube Gym is oriented towards building health and fitness in a positive community environment. He has a Certificate III and Certificate IV in Fitness (Master Trainer, AIF) and a Certificate III Nutrition Coach (AIF).

Quinn was part of the investor group of celebrities which backed the launch of Hard Fizz alcoholic seltzer in 2020.

Quinn is co-founder with talent manager Erin White and art director Meg Yonson in 2021 of Studio Maybe, a photo-video studio equipped for food, fashion and e-commerce photography and videography.

He founded and co-owns TC Pro, which provides a customisable software platform for gyms and fitness studios.

Quinn has been a brand ambassador for Jeep Australia for almost 15 years.

== Charitable work ==
Quinn has been a Starlight Children's Foundation ambassador since 2011. His younger sister, Madison, was diagnosed with leukemia when young (she is now healthy and in remission) when she was granted a Starlight wish.

He has been an ambassador of the LifeChanger Foundation since 2018.

Quinn started the Vipers Run Club, a men's mental health running group based in Sydney's Northern Beaches, in 2018.

== Personal life ==
Quinn, who is left-handed, grew up in Sydney's Northern Beaches. He credits his mother, a home economist who taught at TAFE and wrote recipes for Taste Magazine, with inspiring his love of food. He was named Cleo Bachelor of the Year in 2012.

He holds a Bachelor of Science in Marine Biology and is a professional lifeguard.

Quinn married American model Jax Raynor in 2023.

== See also ==
- Hayden Quinn
