= Alannah Halay =

British composer and author

- Born: Yorkshire, United Kingdom.
- Education: BA, MMus, PhD, AFHEA, PCertLAM, QTS, PGCE, MCCT
- Occupations: Composer, author
- Years active: 2010–present
- Website: alannah.co

Alannah Marie Halay is an internationally performed British composer and author known for her work with avant-garde, contemporary classical, and experimental music. Halay studied at the University of Leeds, where she received her PhD in composition. She is an Associate Fellow of the Higher Education Academy (AFHEA) and qualified teacher (QTS, PGCE, MCCT).

== Career ==
Halay received a place at the University of Leeds via its Access to Leeds Scheme. She began her composing career when her piece Dry Veins (2012) for piano and voice was performed in the Leeds Lieder festival in 2012. She was later the winner of the Yorkshire Young Sinfonia Composition Competition 2015, and her composition Air, Earth, Water, Fire was selected to be workshopped in its summer course and performed alongside its BBC Radio 4 programme. In the same year, she had a composition selected for the Gaudeamus Muziekweek Academy, which would be performed in the Gaudeamus Muziekweek Festival in 2016. She attended the Gaudeamus Muziekweek Academy in the summer 2015 where she studied composition and contemporary harp techniques, and where she was selected to be the UK composer in cellist Katharina Gross's worldwide Cellomondo project. Later in 2015, she worked with Hans-Joachim Hespos as a performer and composer, performing Hespos' Tja (1981) for pianist, wuniof 'k (1989) on piano, and realising the tape part for his MusikBoxen (1995). During this time she also received composition and performance training from Hespos. In 2017, she worked with Dr Michael Spencer to celebrate the University of Leeds becoming a Steinway School, with their piece Resonance/Light/Decay being composed to be played on twenty-eight Steinway pianos. Throughout 2022, Halay worked with the Calouste Gulbenkian Foundation through the support of enoa (European Network of Opera Academies), which selected her upcoming opera project, Queering Opera, for its Opera Creation Journey programme. This follows her previous opera, Pacific Pleasures, which was written as a prequel to Leonard Bernstein's Trouble in Tahiti, and performed together by Bloomsbury Opera at Goodenough College in 2017.

In 2026, Halay's opera Pacific Pleasures went on tour throughout Portugal. It was directed by Jorge Balça and conducted by Pablo Urbina. It was performed by the Orquestra do Algarve and co-produced by Fadas e Elfos - Associação Cultural. It was also performed by Inês Constantino (mezzo-soprano), Ricardo Panela (baritone), Rui Baeta (baritone), Sofia Marafona (soprano), Leonel Pinheiro (tenor), Ana Rebelo and Luís Godinho (puppeteers). It received support from the following bodies: Lagoa City Council, Loulé City Council, Belém Cultural Center, Lagos City Council, Aegis-Poruguese Association of Arts, Parish Council of Misericórdia, and institutional support from National Arts Plan and the University of Algarve. It was also supported by the Portuguese Republic - Culture, Youth and Sport DGARTES - Directorate-General for the Arts.

Overall, Halay's music has been performed internationally, by musicians such as Ian Pace, Rui Baeta, Katharina Gross, Peter Wiegold (Notes Inégales), Ryszard Lubieniecki, Lara Martins, and others.

== Publications ==
Halay's practice-led research formed the basis of her PhD thesis, Recognising Absurdity through Compositional Practice: Comparing an Avant-Garde Style with being avant garde. The same methodology has informed her other publications, including her edited book, (Per)Forming Art: Performance as Research in Contemporary Artworks, published by Cambridge Scholars Publishing. Some of Halay's musical scores are available from the University of California, Los Angeles, Music Library: Contemporary Music Score Collection. Halay is also published by Vernon Press, the University of Nebraska Press, and Taylor & Francis.

== List of Compositions ==
- 2024
- Water Cast through Iron (2024) for flute, piano, cello
- 1 Kings 19:11–13 (2024) electronic
- Energy Cannot Be Created V: some days if i could scream (2024) for ensemble
- 2023
- Un Alphabet Prononcé (2023) electronic
- Romantic love and lethargy (2023) electronic
- one that got away (2023) electronic
- 2022
- I am what I am (2022) electronic
- Glitter Balls (Opera: Act 1 Finale Piano Reduction) (2022)
- 2020
- The Signal Man (2017, rev. 2020) electronic
- 2019
- Phaedra (2019) electronic
- 2018
- Energy Cannot Be Created IV: ...generously taken (2018) for ensemble
- Energy Cannot Be Created III: transferred states (2018) for ensemble
- 2017
- Resonance/Light/Decay (2017) for 28 Steinway pianos
- 'il progressi sempre tardi arriva' (2017) for piano
- Cotransmission, Neurotransmission, Summation (2017) electronic
- Tear (2017) electronic
- Brief Encounter (2017) electronic
- Film score for Littley Car (2016–17)
- Pacific Pleasures (2016–17) opera: orchestra and SATB opera cast
- 2016
- We Lived in the Gaps Between the Stories (2016) accordion and optional electronics
- I Am Bound (2016) electronics
- [Co]Valence Ib (2016) string quartet
- [Co]Valence Ic (2016) string quartet
- [Co]Valence Id (2016) string quartet
- [Co]Valence IV (2016) string quartet
- [Co]Valence IIIa: Battling a Diversion of Thought (2016)
- [Co]Valence IIIb: Battling a Diversion of Thought (2016)
- [Co]Valence IIIc: Battling a Diversion of Thought (2016)
- [Co]Valence II (2016) large flute ensemble
- 2015
- petrichor (2015) electronic and guitar
- It sounds an isochronism. (2015) piano and electronics
- To Rave in a Fifteenth-Century Discotheque from another Time Entirely (2015) string instrument and electronics
- Air, Earth, Water, Fire (2015) orchestra
- angustia (2015) flute, accordion, violin
- Praying for Gabriel (2015) ensemble
- Energy Cannot Be Created II: ^{4}B_{4} (2014–15) ensemble
- 2014
- [Co]Valence Ia (2014) string quartet
- The Interlocutor (2014) ensemble
- '...with still a life or two to spare for the space of his occupancy...' (2014) cello
- [Co]Valence IIIb (2014)
- Parallax Error (2014) any four-string bowed instrument
- Re-press[ed] (2014) piano
- The Ridge is beyond the Edge (2014) electronic
- Graphite Pendulum (2014) clarinet and electronics
- Energy Cannot Be Created I: the title is an image (2013–14)
- 2013 ensemble
- A Matter of Energy (2013) ensemble
- CROSSWOR[K] (2013) any; graphic score
- '...the space of his occupancy of a world at a time...' (2013) cello
- Inner a Mirror (2013) ensemble
- Mo[u]rning Medi[t/c]ation (2013) various (percussion, organ, strings)
- '...it's already been done!' (2013) electronics
- Interstice (2013–16) iPhone app
- Sienna I (2013) violin, piano, cello
- Sienna II (2013) violin, piano, cello
- The Carbon Loop (2013) large percussion ensemble
- 2012
- In the Zone (2012–13) ensemble
- Dry Veins (2012) soprano and piano
- Escaping Frozen Music (2012) large orchestra
- Breaking the Four Chambers (2012) four instruments
- 2011
- Synchronising Pendulums (2011) ensemble
- Arbitrary Iridescence (2011) ensemble
- The Formation of Alcohol (2011) clarinet, piano, violin
- Temporal Space (2011) 21 percussionists
- 3 √Cube3 a.k.a. THE CUBE (2010–11) ensemble

== Discography ==
- Parallax Error (2014): Katarina Gross, on Cellomondo #2: Rebirth in Sound (2018)
- We Lived in the Gaps between the Stories (2016): Ryszard Lubieniecki, on Seeds (2019)
- Electronic Experimentations 2013-2019 (2019)
- angustia (2015) and We Lived in the Gaps between the Stories (2016): Layers, on Grundgestein (2021)

== Bibliography ==
- Halay, Alannah Marie (September 2016). Recognising Absurdity through Compositional Practice: Comparing an Avant-Garde Style with being avant garde (PhD thesis). University of Leeds – via White Rose eTheses Online.
- "(Per)Forming Art: Performance as a Compositional Technique", in (Per)Forming Art: Performance as Research in Contemporary Artworks, ed. by Alannah Marie Halay (London: Cambridge Scholars Publishing, 2016), pp. 37–51.
- "New Music Biennial, Hull", in Sounds Like Now: Contemporary Music News magazine
- "'We Lived in the Gaps Between the Stories' (2016) Amplified Accordion", in Women and Music Journal (21: 2018)
- "'Xenakis, not Gounod': Xenakis, the Avant Garde, and May '68", in Exploring Xenakis: Performance, Practice, Philosophy (Wilmington, Delaware: Vernon Press, 2019)
- "Parallax Error (2014) for any four-string bowed instrument" in UCLA Music Library: Contemporary Music Score Collection (2020)
- "The Interlocutor (2014) for Horn, Electric Guitar, Piano (& synthesizer), Electric Violin" in UCLA Music Library: Contemporary Music Score Collection (2020)
- "Air, Earth, Water, Fire (2015) for orchestra" in UCLA Music Library: Contemporary Music Score Collection (2020)
- "Exploring dialogic teaching of GCSE English Literature within increasingly regulated school environments." English in Education, 1-12
