= Lilani =

Lilani is a given name and a surname. Notable people with the name include:

- Lilani Brinkman (born 1985), Namibian politician
- Pinky Lilani (born 1954), Indian author, speaker and women's advocate

== See also ==
- Leilani (disambiguation)
