= Alanna Nobbs =

Australian academic

Professor Alanna Nobbs is the president of the Society for the Study of Early Christianity.

She earned a BA Hons1 and PhD in Latin at the University of Sydney. She taught at Macquarie University and was head of school. Her specialization being in Greek Early Christian and Byzantine documents.

She was recognised in the Queen's Birthday 2012 list with the award of Member of the Order of Australia for her service to ancient history and the classics. Her husband is former fellow professor at Macquarie University, Ray Nobbs, who was also Dean of the Australian College of Theology.

== About the society ==
The society was established by the vice-chancellor on 8 May 1987, and a Constitution for the society was approved by the Council of Macquarie University in December 1987. The society has no ecclesiastical ties, however it collaborates on academic occasions with Christian and Jewish theology colleges and communities. Its president is Professor Alanna Nobbs.

The society circulates three newsletters a year outlining its activities.

1. May SSEC Conference - an annual conference hosting international speakers on issues of the New Testament and early Christianity.

== Publications ==
- Into all the world : emergent Christianity in its Jewish and Greco-Roman context, 2017
- All things to all cultures : Paul among Jews, Greeks, and Romans, 2013
- Jerusalem and Athens : cultural transformation in late antiquity, 2010
- The content and setting of the Gospel tradition, 2010
- Ungodly women in Revelation, 1990
- Kambala : the first hundred years, 1887-1987, 1987
