= Alanna Connors =

American astronomer (1956–2013)

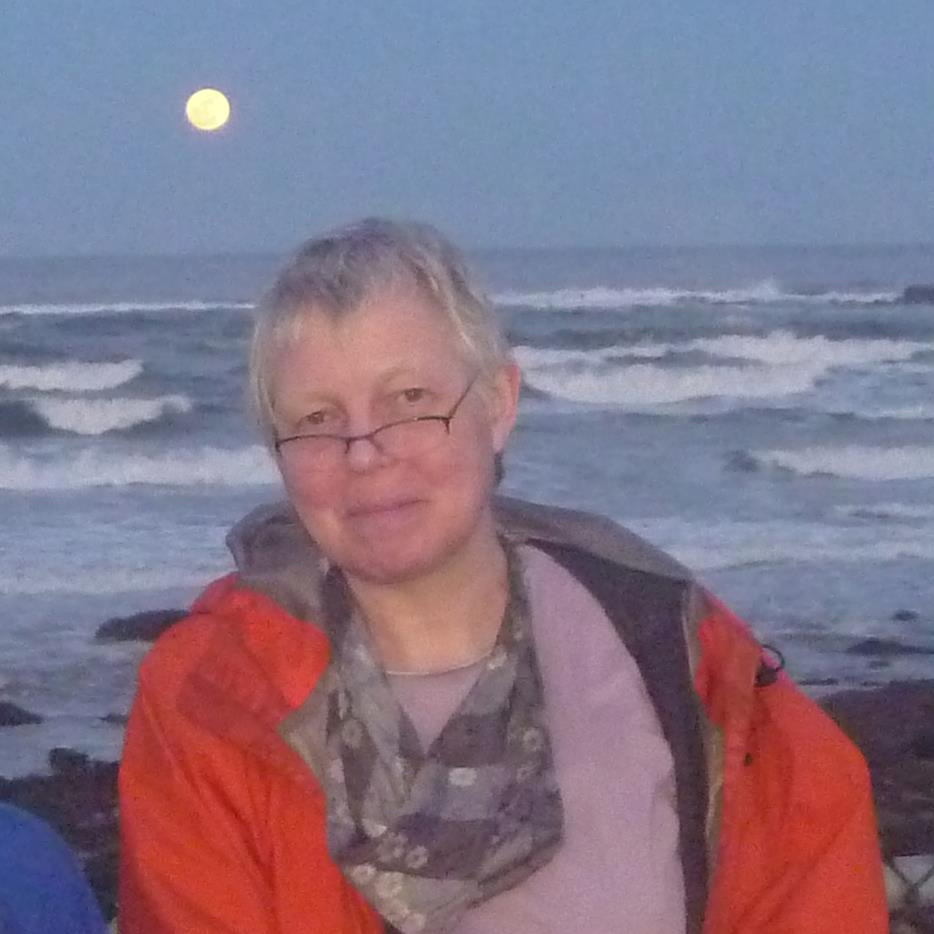
Alanna Connors

Alanna Connors (1956–2013) was a Hong Kong-born American astronomer and statistician known for her introduction and advocacy of Bayesian statistics in high-energy astronomy, and for her early use of the Python programming language in astronomy.

Connors was the daughter of an airplane pilot for Pan Am; she was born in Hong Kong, where her father was based, on September 25 1956. She moved to Greenwich, Connecticut as a child. She majored in physics at the Massachusetts Institute of Technology, graduating in 1978, and completed a Ph.D. in astronomy and physics in 1988 at the University of Maryland, College Park. Her doctoral research, conducted at NASA's Goddard Space Flight Center, concerned X-ray transients. Her later career included work as a researcher at the University of New Hampshire's Space Science Center and as visiting faculty at Wellesley College, working with data from the Compton Gamma Ray Observatory.

She was a founder of the California-Harvard Astrostatistics Collaboration (CHASC), in 1997, and through it she became "a driving force of CHASC’s education mission and outreach effort, helping statisticians understand science and scientists understand statistics".

She died of breast cancer on February 2, 2013.
