= Cesare Casella =

Italian chef

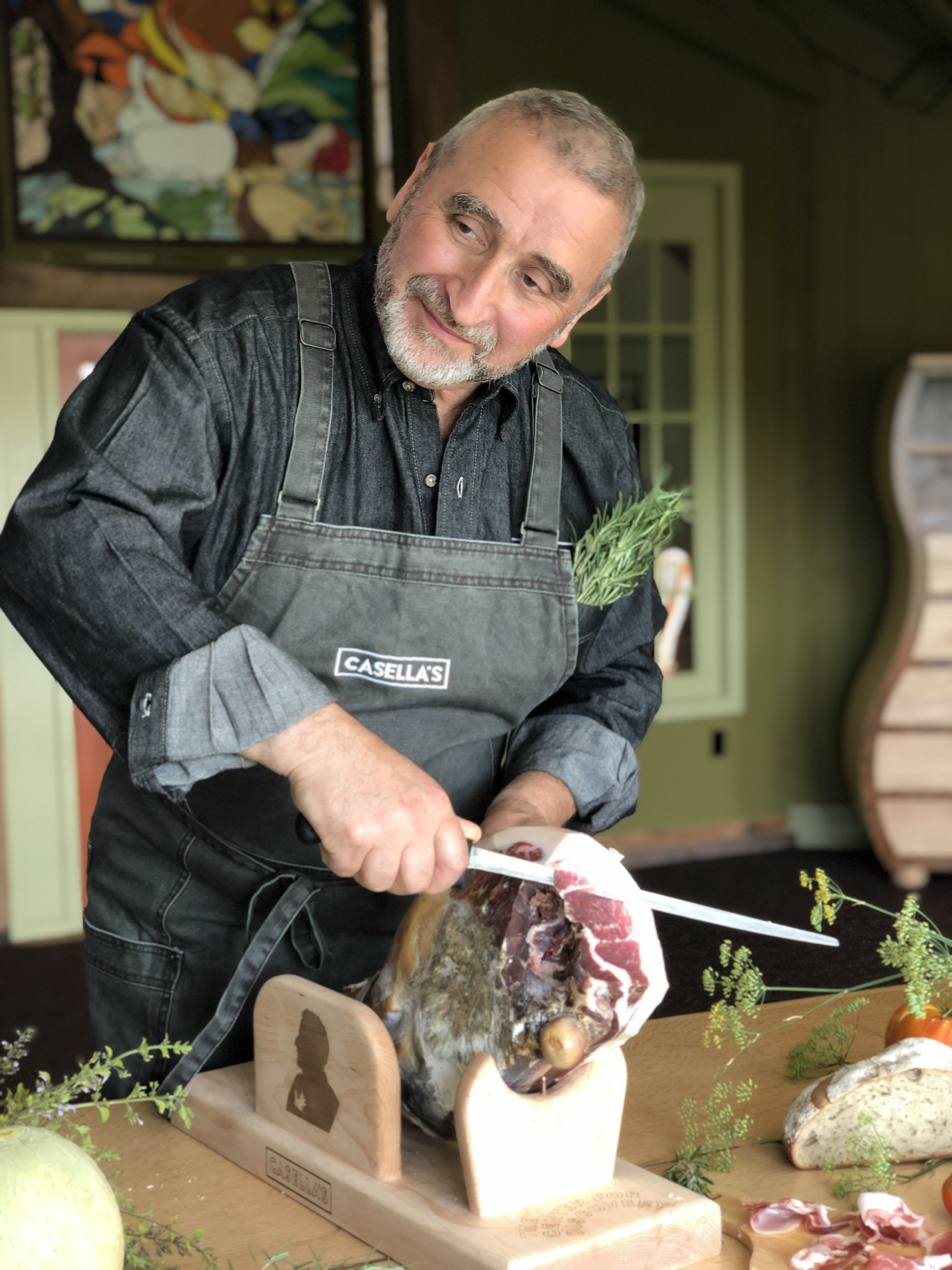
- Casella slicing his Prosciutto Speciale
- Born: Lucca, Italy
- Education: Culinary Institute Ferdinando Martini, Montecatini, Italy,
- Culinary career
- Cooking style: Italian
- Television show(s): Iron Chef America; Top Chef; Master Chef Australia; The Best Thing I Ever Ate; Anthony Bourdain: No Reservations; Food Porn; After Hours with Daniel Boulud, Martha Stewart Living
- Website: www.cesarecasella.com

Cesare Casella (born 1960) is an Italian chef and restaurateur based in New York. He is Dean of Italian Studies at the International Culinary Center in New York City. He was behind celebrated New York restaurants such as Beppe and Maremma. Casella is currently Chief of the Department of Nourishment Arts at the Center for Discovery nestled in the Catskills and as Dean of Italian Studies at the International Culinary Center. He also operates his own salumi company, Casella's Salumi, where he makes prosciutto from heritage breed pigs, true to the classic Italian recipes and flavors of his childhood in Tuscany. He has written several books, including True Tuscan, The Fundamental Techniques of Italian Cooking, and Feeding the Heart.

== Personal life ==
Casella learned the trade at Vipore, the trattoria owned by his parents, Rosa and Pietro, outside of Lucca, Italy. At age 14, Casella enrolled in the Culinary Institute Ferdinando Martini, in Montecatini, Italy, against his parents' wishes. After graduating, he worked in his parents' trattoria to transform Vipore from a local favorite to a regional and international destination. He began developing herbal cuisine, including a garden with over 40 aromatic herbs, and updating traditional Italian recipes. By 1991, Casella had earned Vipore a Michelin Guide star and a reputation that attracted clients including Henry Kissinger and Tom Cruise.

Casella now lives with his wife and daughter in New York City.

== Professional career ==
Casella arrived in New York City in the early 1990s with the goal of introducing Tuscan-style cooking to the American public. His early career included being Executive Chef of Coco Pazzo in New York City in 1993. Soon afterward, he launched its sister restaurant, Il Toscanaccio. He opened his first solo New York restaurant, Beppe, in honor of his grandfather, Giuseppe Polidori, in March 2001. Beppe earned critical praise and commercial success for its Tuscan cuisine.

Casella's previous endeavors include the Italian restaurant Maremma, located in Manhattan's West Village, which opened in 2005. New York Magazine named Maremma one of the Top 5 Best New Restaurants in New York City in 2006. At the end of its first year, Maremma received three stars from Forbes magazine, naming it one of the best restaurants in the country. Casella's lamb meatballs held the Number One spot in New York Magazine's Best Meatballs in New York City. Maremma closed within three years due to poor location.

He also launched Casella's Salumi, which distributes products nationally. Growing up in Tuscany, one of Casella's jobs was helping make the country-cured meats his family restaurant was famous for, and when he got older, he would help the norcini, the old-school butchers who traveled from farmer to farmer each winter, prepare the prosciutti. Today, as the prosciutto whisperer, he uses those Italian techniques to create cured-on-the-bone prosciutti.

Casella has appeared on the television series After Hours with Daniel Boulud playing host and guest chef. In 2007, he received Food Arts magazine's Silver Spoon Award for outstanding achievement in the culinary field.

== Culinary schools ==
In 2006, the International Culinary Center, previously known as the French Culinary Institute, appointed Casella as the first dean of Italian Studies in both New York City and Parma, Italy. Casella designed and wrote the curriculum for the joint programs and oversaw the training of all chefs and instructors involved. The International Culinary Center School of Italian Studies, formerly known as The Italian Culinary Academy, launched in October 2006 in New York City and in January 2007 in Parma.

In spring 2011, Casella launched The Italian Cooking School, a program in which he led culinary tours across Italy, promoting education in Italian cuisine, ingredients, and culture, as well as a video project to document the tours.

== Books ==
Casella has written several books, including Diary of a Tuscan Chef (Broadway 1998), Italian Cooking for Dummies (Wiley 2002), True Tuscan (Morrow 2005), and Introduction to Italian Cuisine, the textbook for the Italian Culinary Academy.

== Guest appearances ==
Casella appears regularly on television. Appearances include The Secret Life of..., After Hours with Daniel Boulud, Top Chef, ABC's Nightline, FOX News, New York 1, The Martha Stewart Show, Iron Chef America, Anthony Bourdain: No Reservations, The Best Thing Ever, and FOX 5's Good Day Café.
