= Alana Semuels =

American journalist

- Born: Belmont, Massachusetts, U.S.
- Education: Harvard University, London School of Economics
- Occupation: Journalist
- Children: 1
- Website: alanasemuels.com

Alana Semuels is an American journalist.

== Early life and education ==
Semuels, born in Belmont, Massachusetts, attended Harvard University, where she earned Bachelor of Arts in American history and literature. She also received a Rotary Scholarship to study at the London School of Economics, where she received a master's degree.

== Career ==
While in London, Semuels was a correspondent for The Boston Globe newspaper. She formerly worked as a national correspondent for the Los Angeles Times in New York, and covered the economy for that newspaper out of Los Angeles.

She also previously covered Great Britain for The Boston Globe as well as health and technology topics for the Pittsburgh Post-Gazette. She was a staff writer for The Atlantic in San Francisco, California. As of 2021, she is senior economics Correspondent at Time.

== Work ==
Semuels was a Gerald Loeb Award finalist in 2014 for her series about the diminishing power of employees at the workplace. She was named "Journalist of the Year" at the 2009 Los Angeles Press Club Awards. She also won a feature writing award from the Society of Business Editors and Writers in 2011. She also received an award from the Society of Business Editors and Writers in 2017 for a story, "The Problem With Rolling Back Regulations." Semuels traveled to Japan and Sweden in the summer of 2017 as an Abe Fellow for Journalists, sponsored by the Social Science Research Council.

Semuels's article "Crossing the Mexican-American Border, Every Day" was cited in Supreme Court Justice Stephen Breyer's dissent for the case Hernandez v. Mesa. Travel stories by Semuels from Africa and South America have appeared in three anthologies by Lonely Planet: By the Seat of My Pants, Tales from Nowhere, and Best of Lonely Planet Travel Writing.

== Personal life ==
Semuels has a son (born October 23, 2020).
