= Pablo Urbina =

Spanish conductor (born 1988)

Pablo Urbina (born June 28, 1988, in Vitoria-Gasteiz, Spain) is a Spanish conductor.

== Early life and education ==
Pablo grew up in Pamplona, Spain.

In 2014, Urbina completed his Master of Music degree at the Royal College of Music in London, studying with Peter Stark.

== Conducting career ==
Pablo Urbina has conducted orchestras including the RTVE Symphony Orchestra, Royal Liverpool Philharmonic Orchestra, The Hallé,Ulster Orchestra, Castilla y Leon Symphony Orchestra, Málaga Philharmonic, Waco Symphony Orchestra, and Orquestra do Algarve.

From 2013 to 2019, he was the music director of the London City Orchestra.

From 2020 to 2021, he was assistant conductor of the Balearic Symphony Orchestra, working with Pablo Mielgo.

Since 2019, he has been principal conductor of London-based Orchestra Vitae.

In March 2023, he was awarded Third Prize at the Siemens Hallé International Conductor's Competition, working with The Hallé Orchestra.

== Charity work ==
Urbina is an Ambassador of the UK charity The Amber Trust, helping blind and visually impaired children to pursue musical studies. He is also a Trustee of the London City Orchestra.

== Discography ==
In 2016, his tribute concert with the Málaga Philharmonic for American composer Michael Kamen was released by Quartet Records

In 2020, he recorded the soundtrack for the new exhibition of Gaudí's Casa Batlló in Barcelona, and in 2021 he recorded half of the debut album of composer Dani Howard, with Royal Liverpool Philharmonic, which was released in 2024.

== Performing career ==
As a French horn player, Urbina was a member of the Cataleya Quintet from 2011 to 2017. He joined the San Diego Youth Symphony as associate principal French horn in 2005, and played with the American Youth Symphony.

== Personal life ==
Pablo Urbina married the British composer Dani Howard in 2022.
