= Alana Cruise =

American pornographic performer (1981–2025)

- Born: January 6, 1981; New Jersey, U.S.
- Died: May 23, 2025 (aged 44); Las Vegas, Nevada, U.S.
- Other name: Savannah Fyre
- Occupations: Actress; model
- Years active: 2014–2023

Alana Cruise (January 6, 1981 – May 23, 2025) was an American pornographic actress and erotic model.

== Biography ==
Alana Cruise was born on January 6, 1981, in New Jersey into a family of English, Irish, and Italian descent. Before entering the pornography industry, she enlisted in the United States Army as a field medic. She earned a degree in Psychology and obtained a medical assistant technical certificate.

Looking for other ways to earn income, she began performing private shows as a camgirl. This is how she got her start in the industry, traveling around the country and attending various pornographic conventions to connect with industry professionals and production companies. She made her debut as a pornographic actress in 2014, at the age of 33. Like many other actresses who started in the industry after the age of 30, she was labeled a MILF actress due to her physique, age, and attributes.

As an actress she worked for production companies such as Digital Sin, Girlfriends Films, White Ghetto, 21Sextury, Kink.com, Reality Kings, Twistys, Wicked Pictures, New Sensations, Lethal Hardcore, Brazzers, Naughty America and Zero Tolerance, among others.

In 2017, she filmed her first gangbang scene with Samantha Rone in My First Gangbang. She retired in 2023, having appeared in over 290 films as a performer.

She died on May 23, 2025, at the age of 44, in Las Vegas, Nevada, from cancer.

Other films in her filmography include A Quick Learner, Blind Date, Drill Her Ass 2, Family Affairs 2, Gangbangs 3, Keeping It In The Family, Mommy Caught Me, Squirting Stepmoms, Transsexual Mashup and Uma Jolie Unleashed.

== Awards and nominations ==
Year	Ceremony	Result	Award
2018	Spank Bank Awards	Nominated	Best Swallower
2018	Spank Bank Awards	Nominated	Magnificent MILF of the Year
2018	Spank Bank Awards	Nominated	Super Squirter of the Year
2018	Spank Bank Awards	Nominated	Two Peas in a Pod
2019	Spank Bank Awards	Nominated	Cuckold Queen of the Year
2019	Spank Bank Awards	Nominated	Deepest Throat
