= Alana Golmei =

Indian social activist

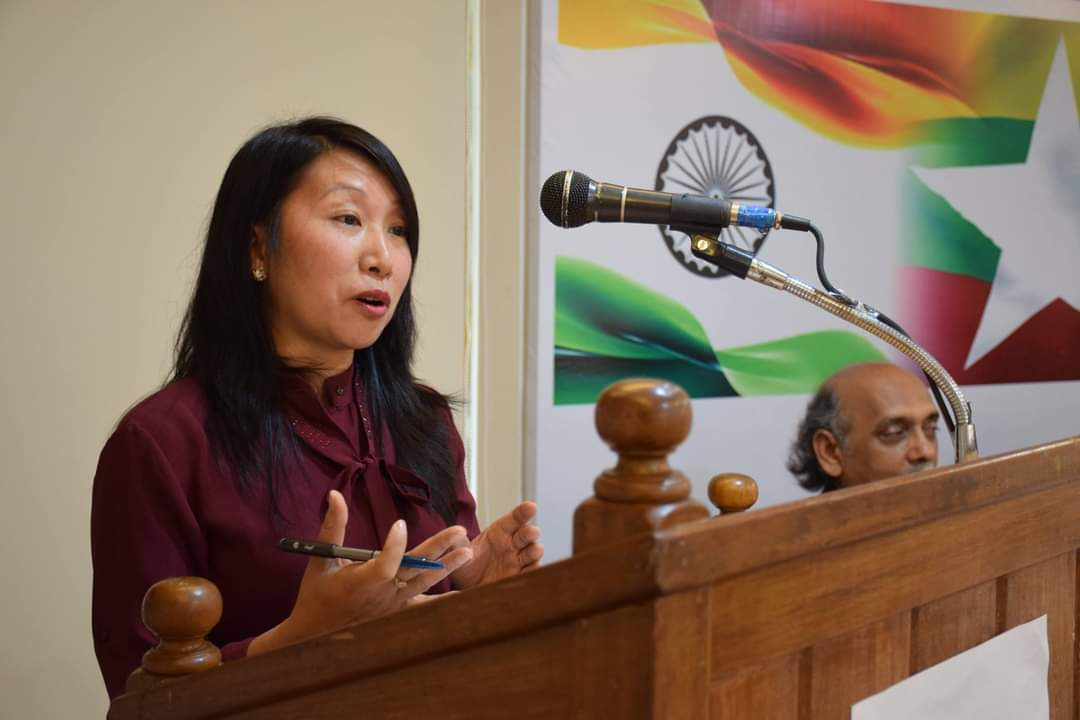
- Alana Golmei at India-Myanmar Media Dialogue in Shillong. 2016
- Born: Tamenglong, India
- Occupation: social activist
- Known for: North East Support Center & Helpline; Burma Center Delhi; Pann Nu Foundation

Dr. Alana Golmei is an Indian humanitarian, activist, lawyer. She is the founder of Pann Nu Foundation and founding member of Burma Center Delhi.

Golmei was awarded the Delhi Commission for Women's Achievement Award in 2016.

== Early life ==
She was born in Tamenglong and is of Naga ethnicity from Manipur.

== North East Support Center & Helpline ==
She started the North East Support Centre & Helpline in 2007 to assist and prevent harassment and abuses meted out to women, the North East people and tribal communities in Delhi and National Capital Region in India. She is also a member Bezbaruah Committee formed in 2014 to suggest measures to deal with racial discrimination targeted at Northeastern Indians.
