= Society for the Study of Early Christianity =

Professional association of historians and biblical scholars

The Society for the Study of Early Christianity is a professional association of ancient historians and biblical scholars, established within the Ancient Cultures Research Centre (ACRC) at Macquarie University. This assists SSEC in "fulfilling its aims through the study of the New Testament in its times, including its Jewish context, and the development of Early Christianity."

== History and purpose ==
The Society was established by the Vice-Chancellor on 8 May 1987, and a Constitution for the Society was approved by the Council of Macquarie University in December 1987. The society has no ecclesiastical ties, however it collaborates on academic occasions with Christian and Jewish theology colleges and communities. The current president is Alanna Nobbs. The society circulates three newsletters a year outlining their activities.

The society lists its aims as:

- To encourage the study of the New Testament in its times and related topics.
- To build up resources for this study (for example, books, papyri, coins).
- To organise conferences, public lectures, seminars and other activities to which the Society's members are invited.
- To circulate three newsletters a year outlining forthcoming activities.

== Projects ==
The Society supports a number of associated projects including:

1. New Documents Illustrating early Christianity - a project publishing Greek papyri and inscriptions related to the rise of Christianity within the multi-volume New Documents Illustrating Early Christianity.
2. Papyri from the Rise of Christianity in Egypt (formerly known as Corpus Papyrorum Christianarum or Corpus of Christian Papyri) - a project aiming to "collect all the papyri (including ostraca, parchment, and tablets) which document the rise of Christianity in Egypt down to the victory of Constantine over Licinius in 324."
3. Corpus Fontium Manichaeorum - a project sponsored by a number of international organisations including UNESCO and the Union of International Academies which aims to produce over 60 volumes of Manichaean texts from Egypt and Central Asia.
4. May Conference - an annual conference hosting international speakers on issues of the New Testament and early Christianity.

== See also ==
- Society of Biblical Literature
