= Alana Mann =

Food activist and food politics scholar

- Born: Australia
- Occupation: Food activist
- Known for: Interdisciplinary scholar researching the power relations between media, governments, institutions and citizens, in the field of food politics

Alana Mann is an Australian food activist and interdisciplinary scholar researching the power relations between media, governments, institutions and citizens, in the field of food politics. She is co-founder of FoodLab Sydney, a business incubator to address issues around local food insecurity, based on the model pioneered by FoodLab Detroit. Mann is Professor and Head of Discipline (Media) at the University of Tasmania. She led the Department of Media and Communications at University of Sydney and was a key researcher in the Sydney Environment Institute; the Charles Perkins Centre and Sydney Democracy Network; and in 2018 was a visiting scholar at both Harvard's Food Law and Policy Clinic and the Department of Development Sociology at Cornell University. She is author of Food in a Changing Climate (2021), Voice and Participation in Global Food Politics (2019) & Global Activism in Food Politics: Power Shift (2014).

== Biography ==
Mann graduated from Central Queensland University with a Bachelor of Arts (Communications), followed by a Diploma of Education in 1990 from University of Queensland. She had a successful career in the media and not-for-profit sectors, working across marketing and public relations for organisations, including seven years with Fairfax Media, publisher of The Sydney Morning Herald, and from 2014 to 2016 served as Communications Officer of Australian Food Sovereignty Alliance, a farmer-led organisation dedicated to sustainability and best practices. Mann undertook a Master of Media Practice at University of Sydney, followed by a PhD in 2011, with the thesis title Framing food sovereignty: a study of social movement communication. She writes about the politics of food for The Conversation and the Australian Broadcast Corporation.

She joined University of Sydney as a lecturer in 2007 and became Chair of Department in 2017.

Mann is a member of

- International Political Science Association (IPSA)
- International Association for Media and Communication Research (IAMCR)
- International Federation of University Women (IFUW)
- International Communication Association (ICA)
- The Australasian Agri-Food Research Network

== Research ==
Mann's 2021 book Food in a Changing Climate explores new food technologies, traditional knowledges and how to build diversity to protect the livelihoods of food producers. Philip McMichael, Professor of Global Development at Cornell University, described it as "a wake-up call to the plunder of life-worlds and ecosystems at this geological tipping point". Her 2014 book Global Activism in Food Politics: Power Shift investigated La Vía Campesina (LVC), the central player in the food sovereignty movement, purportedly the largest social movement in the world, spanning more than 70 countries and involving more than 200 million members (small producers and landless workers). The Journal of World Systems Research called it a unique book that offered "nuanced characterization of social movement logistics" that should inspire collective action against a food regime that "undermines farming cultures, exploits agricultural workers and degrades ecosystems". Mann presented three case studies of domestic organizations: Chile's National Association of Indigenous and Rural Women (ANAMURI); Mexico's Asociación Nacional de Empresas Comercializadoras de Productores del Campo (ANEC); and the Basque Farmers’ Union Euskal Herriko Nelazarien Elkartasuna (EHNE). International Quarterly 2015 wrote in its review: "Mann’s narrative is essential for social activists and food policymakers who are working to solve one of the most pressing domestic and foreign policy challenges: creating an environmentally sustainable food system."

== Selected publications ==
2021

- Mann, A. (2021). Food in a Changing Climate. Emerald Publishing Limited. Bingley UK. ISBN 978-1839827259

2020

- Mann, A. (2020). Are you local? Digital inclusion in participatory foodscapes. In Deborah Lupton and Zeena Feldman (Eds.), Digital Food Cultures, (pp. 147–161). London, UK: Routledge. ISBN 9780429688058
- Mann, A. (2020). The Protection of Small-scale Fisheries in Global Policymaking Through Food Sovereignty. In Elspeth Probyn, Kate Johnston, and Nancy Lee (Eds.), Sustaining seas: Oceanic Space and the Politics of Care. Lanham: Rowman and Littlefield. ISBN 9781786612830

2019

- Mann, A. (2019). Common Ground: Connections and Tensions Between Food Sovereignty Movements in Australia and Latin America. In Fernanda Penaloza, Sarah Walsh (Eds.), Mapping South-South Connections: Australia and Latin America, (pp. 81–109). Cham: Palgrave Macmillan. ISBN 9783319785769
- Mann, A. (2019). Education for food sovereignty as transformative ethical practice. Policy Futures in Education, 17(7), 862–877. ISSN 1478-2103
- Mann, A. (2019). Food sovereignty: Deep Histories, Digital Activism and the Emergence of a Transnational Public. In Michelle Phillipov, Katherine Kirkwood (Eds.), Alternative Food Politics: From the Margins to the Mainstream, (pp. 113–132). Abingdon: Routledge. ISBN 9781138300804

2018

- Mann, A. (2018). Communication as Resistance in Food Politics. The Political Economy of Communication, 6(1), 36–58.
- Mann, A. (2018). Food Sovereignty and the Politics of Food Scarcity. In Marcelle C Dawson, Christopher Rosin, Nave Wald (Eds.), Global Resource Scarcity: Catalyst for Conflict or Cooperation?, (pp. 131–145). Abingdon: Routledge.
