= Alana Massey =

American writer (born 1985)

Alana Massey (born June 12, 1985) is an American writer. She is the author of All the Lives I Want: Essays About My Best Friends Who Happen to Be Famous Strangers and has contributed to The Guardian, Elle, BuzzFeed, New York Magazine, Vice, Nylon, and Pacific Standard among other publications.

Her work covers online harassment, body dysmorphia, dating, mental health, and sex work. She attributes her first successes to the feminized "pink ghetto" of the "First-Person Industrial Complex" similarly to essayist Emily Gould, but her tone has since developed into more journalistic reporting and commentary.

On February 7, 2017, Grand Central Publishing released All the Lives I Want. In the memoir, Massey "continues to tell stories of herself ... through analysis of celebrity women" including Fiona Apple, Dolly Parton, Lana Del Rey, and Britney Spears.

The memoir includes the essay "Being Winona in a World Made for Gwyneths," originally published by BuzzFeed in 2015. It describes a breakup she experienced, and a foreshadowing incident in which her then-boyfriend expressed attraction to Gwyneth Paltrow, who Massey saw as enviable but uninteresting. In contrast, Massey believed herself to be more similar to Winona Rider: "messy and authentic."

Massey later reflected that when she became financially successful after the essay was published, she adopted a Gwyneth-Paltrow-like appearance and consumer habits without meaning to.
