= Alana McLaughlin =

American mixed martial artist

- Born: 1982 or 1983 (age 43–44)
- Other names: Lady Feral
- Nationality: American
- Height: 5 ft 7 in (170 cm)
- Weight: 145 lb (66 kg; 10 st 5 lb)
- Division: Featherweight
- Reach: 66.5 in (169 cm)
- Fighting out of: Portland, Oregon

Mixed martial arts record
- Total: 1
- Wins: 1
- By submission: 1
- By decision: 0
- Losses: 0
- By knockout: 0
- By submission: 0
- By decision: 0
- Draws: 0
- No contests: 0

Other information
- Mixed martial arts record from Sherdog

Alana McLaughlin is a former member of the U.S. Army Special Forces and current MMA fighter. She has a professional record of 1–0–0, having made her debut fight in Miami at Combate Global on September 10, 2021. She is the second openly trans woman to have fought professionally in MMA.

== Early life ==
McLaughlin grew up in West Columbia, South Carolina in a conservative family that frequently tried to make her more masculine, and in doing so, her family placed her into conversion therapy. McLaughlin was not allowed to play sports until her junior year of high school; at that point, she joined the cross-country team at her high school.

During her final two years of high school, McLaughlin performed well enough to receive a scholarship to Newberry College, and she ran cross-country for two years before deciding to transfer Winthrop University. McLaughlin finished her degree in fine arts in 2015 at UNC-Asheville.

== Special forces career ==
McLaughlin joined the U.S. Army Special Forces in 2003 at the age of 20. By 2007, she was a medical sergeant, who was deployed to Afghanistan as part of a 12-person unit. After six years of service in the military, McLaughlin decided not to re-enlist. McLaughlin earned eight distinguished service medals throughout her career.

== Mixed martial arts career ==
McLaughlin had her professional fighting debut on September 10, 2021, at Combate Global against Celine Provost. Fighting under the name of Lady Feral, McLaughlin won the fight by with a rear-naked choke in the second round, and this gave her a professional record of 1–0–0. McLaughlin trained with MMA Masters – a gym in Hialeah, Florida – prior to the bout. McLaughlin is most known for being the second openly transgender woman to fight professionally in MMA, with the first being Fallon Fox who last fought in 2014.

== Personal life ==
She is pansexual.
