= Alana Lowes =

Australian chef and journalist

- Born: 27 April 1980 (age 46); Melbourne, Australia
- Education: Bachelor of Journalism, Bachelor of Law
- Alma mater: University of Canberra
- Occupations: Cook, writer, presenter, actress
- Television: A Taste of Travel TV Series 2012 (Network Ten); MasterChef Australia 2011 & 2025; Nine News reporter WIN News reporter
- Awards: Third place, MasterChef Australia 2011
- Website: alanalowes.com.au

Alana Jane Lowes (born 27 April 1980) is an Australian writer, presenter and actress. In 2011, Lowes competed in Series 3 of MasterChef Australia. She eventually finished third, behind Kate Bracks and Michael Weldon.

== Early life and career ==
Lowes was born in Melbourne and moved with her parents to Mildura, where she spent all her formative years. She now lives in Brisbane. Lowes studied at the University of Canberra and graduated with a double degree in journalism and law. She worked for WIN News in Canberra as a reporter in 2006, and then with Nine News in Brisbane in 2008. Lowes also worked as a journalist with Style magazine, where her articles included food, travel and interviews with celebrities such as Liam Hemsworth and Julia Zemiro.

== MasterChef ==
After gaining a place in the Top 50 of MasterChef Australia Series 3, Lowes secured a Top 24 position on 5 May 2011 with a soft-hearted chocolate pudding. During her time on MasterChef Australia, Lowes met or cooked with some highly regarded people in the global food industry, including Heston Blumenthal, Thomas Keller, René Redzepi, David Chang, Eric Ripert, Neil Perry, Matt Moran, Maggie Beer, Curtis Stone, Marco Pierre White, Anthony Bourdain, and one of Lowes' food idols, Nigella Lawson. Lowes' nickname among the other contestants on MasterChef Australia was "Nige", with both Lawson and Lowes having long dark hair and a love of chocolate.

Lowes finished MasterChef in third place. Judge Gary Mehigan described Lowes as "One of the best cooks we've ever had. She's meticulous and has a real drive. You sense that whatever happens, food is going to be where she goes in her life".

== Recent work ==
Lowes has considerable experience as a journalist in both broadcast and print media and in recent years has placed her efforts into freelance lifestyle, food and travel writing. Alana Lowes is currently the host of a food and travel series called A Taste of Travel featured on Channel Ten, Australia. She is also writing for ninemsn, as a regular food columnist with ninemsn food. Additionally, Lowes is active on her own website www.alanalowes.com.au and her online blog www.amorishdistraction.com.au. The blog includes original recipes, travel stories and styling tips. Since MasterChef, Lowes has been busy touring Australia with cooking demonstrations and public cooking classes, and more recently entertained MasterChef fans at the annual MasterChef Live event in Sydney, Australia.

She has plans for book and television deals in the future.

== Other interests ==
Aside from food and cooking, Lowes also pursues acting on stage and screen. She has featured in a number of short and full-length feature films cast and filmed in Australia as well as a variety of television commercials. Her notable roles include The Ghosts and Blood Money.

Lowes is also an accomplished Australian rules football player. Her awards include the ACTWAFL Rising Star in 2002 and the Best-and-Fairest player in 2003. She was selected in the all-Australian team for four consecutive years. In June 2011, Lowes appeared in a video with other notable Australian women to promote the Australian Football League Women's Week.

== Charity work ==
Lowes is a national ambassador for the Cancer Council Australia to help raise awareness for women's cancers and an ambassador for the Multiple Sclerosis (MS) Society of Queensland.
