= Leilani (given name) =

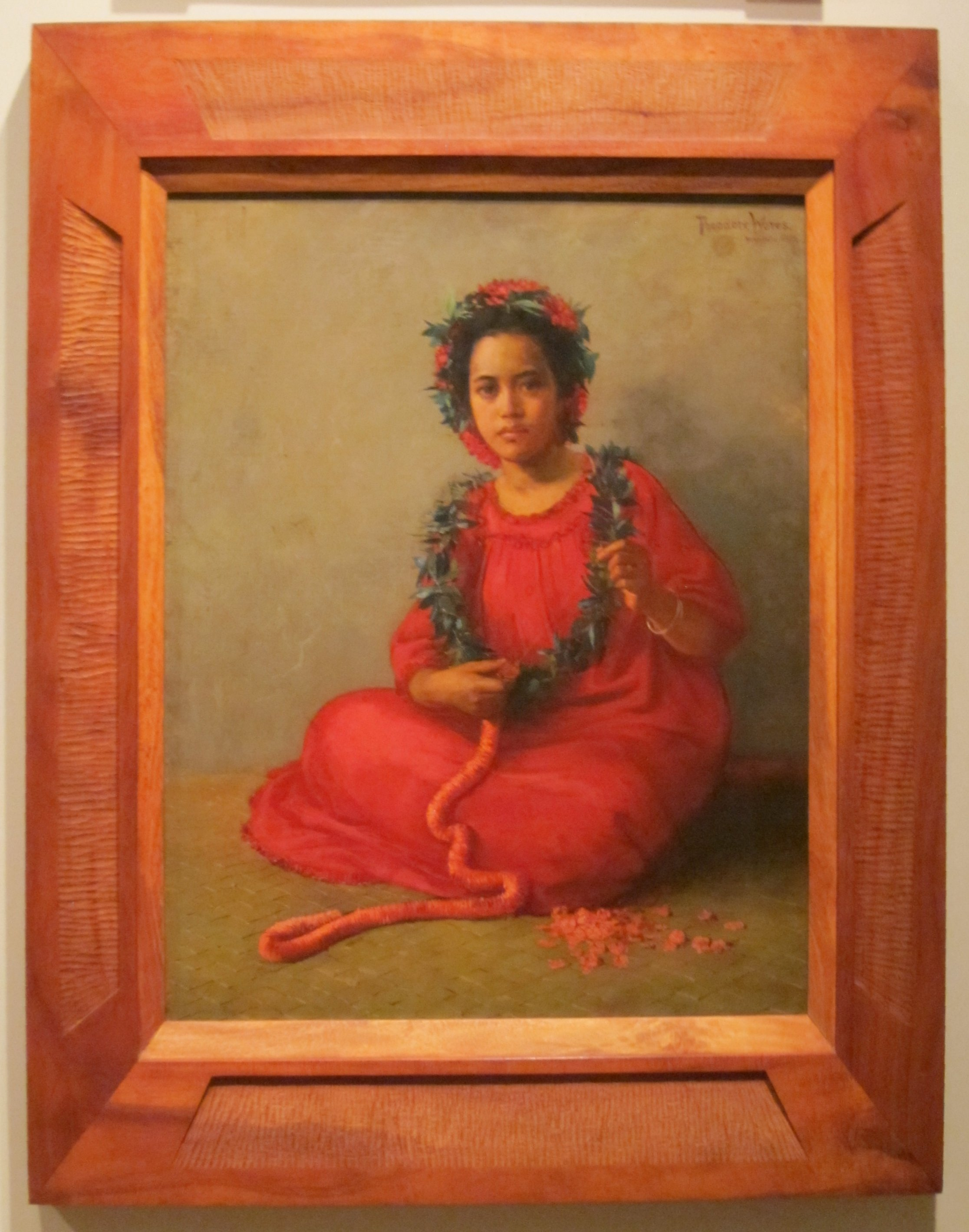
- The Lei Maker by Theodore Wores, 1901

Origin
- Origin: Hawaiian
- Meaning: “heavenly garland of flowers” or “royal child”

Other names
- Related names: Laylana, Laylani, Laylanie, Laylanii, Laylanni, Layliana, Layloni, Laylonie, Laylonni, Leelani, Leighlani, Leihlani, Leilahni, Leilana, Leilanee, Leilanie, Leilanni, Leilanii, Leilanny, Leilany, Leiliana, Leiloni, Lelani, Leliani, Leylani, Leylanie, Leylanni, Leylany

Leilani is a Hawaiian given name meaning "heavenly garland of flowers" or "royal child". The Hawaiian word lei refers to flowers and lani to the sky or heavens, with an association to royalty.

== Popularity ==
The name has increased in popularity in the United States in recent years. It first appeared among the top 1,000 names for American girls in 1937, the same year that the popular song recorded by Bing Crosby called Sweet Leilani was featured in the film Waikiki Wedding. It has since been in steady use. It has been among the 500 most popular names for newborn American girls since 2001 and was the 59th most popular name for girls in the United States in 2022. Phonetic, created spelling variants of the name are also in regular use. Leilani was among the five most popular names for Black newborn girls in the American state of Virginia in 2022.

== People ==
- Leilani Bishop (born 1976), American model
- Leilani Dowding (born 1980), English model
- Leilani Farha, Canadian lawyer and activist
- Leilani Jones (actress) (born 1957), American actress
- Leilani Kai (born 1960), retired professional wrestler
- Leilani Latu (born 1993), Australian rugby league footballer
- Leilani Mitchell (born 1985), American-Australian basketball player
- Leilani Munter (born 1974), American NASCAR driver
- Leilani Rorani (born 1974), New Zealand squash player
- Leilani Sarelle (born 1966), American actress
- Leilani Sen (born 1978), English pop singer
- Raven Leilani (born 1990), American author
