= Survivor (British TV series) series 2 =

Survivor
- Series 2
- Presented by: Mark Nicholas
- No. of days: 37
- No. of castaways: 12
- Winner: Jonny Gibb
- Runner-up: Susannah Moffat
- Location: Bocas del Toro, Panama
- No. of episodes: 12

Release
- Original network: ITV
- Original release: 13 March – 29 May 2002

Series chronology
- ← Previous; Survivor: Pulau Tiga Next → Survivor 2023 (on BBC One)

The second series of Survivor, commonly referred to as Survivor: Panama, premiered on 13 March 2002 and ran until 29 May 2002. The series was presented by cricket presenter Mark Nicholas and consisted of 37 days of gameplay, with 12 castaways competing for a prize of £1,000,000. The season was filmed in the Bocas del Toro Archipelago of Panama.

The 12 contestants were initially separated into two tribes, named North Island and South Island. On Day 17, the eight remaining players merged into one tribe, Columbus, named after explorer Christopher Columbus. The six players voted off from Columbus formed the jury, who along with the British public - as the 7th juror - decided who would be the "Ultimate Survivor". After 37 days of competition, police detective Jonny Gibb was named the "Ultimate Survivor", defeating teacher Susannah Moffat in a 7–0 jury vote. Moffat complained the show portrayed her as an "arty farty teacher with a posh accent".

== Production ==
Despite the lack of success the first series experienced, ITV decided to renew Survivor for a second series, but with an overhaul. These changes included fewer contestants, audience participation and replacing presenters Mark Austin and John Leslie, with a single presenter, Channel 4 cricket presenter Mark Nicholas.

The series was broadcast weekly on Wednesday nights at 9:45 pm and episodes were repeated on Fridays at 8:30 pm. The second series was also accompanied by Survivor: The Last Word, a televised interview with evictees, as well as a supporting series, Survivor: Raw, broadcast on sister channel ITV2. Survivor: Raw was presented by "Ultimate Survivor" of Survivor: Pulau Tiga Charlotte Hobrough, as well as Ed Hall. It included extra footage not aired on the main series, discussions, interviews with evictees and phone-ins and emails from viewers.

== Contestants ==
List of Survivor: Panama contestants
| Contestant | Age | From | Tribe | | Finish | |
| Contestant | Age | From | Original | Merged | Placement | Day |
|---|---|---|---|---|---|---|
| Sarah McCombie | 22 | Highams Park, England | South Island | | 1st voted out | Day 4 |
| Lee Capon | 25 | Thundersley, England | South Island | | 2nd voted out | Day 7 |
| Tayfun Kadioglu | 27 | London, England | North Island | | 3rd voted out | Day 10 |
| Meeta Bose | 34 | Stevenage, England | North Island | | 4th voted out | Day 13 |
| Helen Carney | 22 | Sheffield, England | North Island | Columbus (Note: The Columbus tribe did not have an official tribe colour, they simply had a flag resembling the flag of Panama with the frog and turtle replacing the red and blue stars.) | Eliminated; 1st jury member | Day 20 |
| Alastair Brogan | 34 | Motherwell, Scotland | North Island | Columbus | 6th voted out 2nd jury member | Day 23 |
| Drew Agger | 27 | Hereford, England | North Island | Columbus | 7th voted out 3rd jury member | Day 26 |
| Dave Porter | 55 | Newcastle upon Tyne, England | North Island | Columbus | 8th voted out 4th jury member | Day 29 |
| Bridget Griffiths | 43 | Wantage, England | South Island | Columbus | 9th voted out 5th jury member | Day 32 |
| John Dalzell | 32 | Winchester, England | South Island | Columbus | 10th voted out 6th jury member | Day 35 |
| Susannah Moffat | 27 | Wimbledon, England | South Island | Columbus | Runner-up | Day 37 |
| Jonny Gibb | 30 | Edinburgh, Scotland | South Island | Columbus | Ultimate Survivor | Day 37 |

== Season summary ==
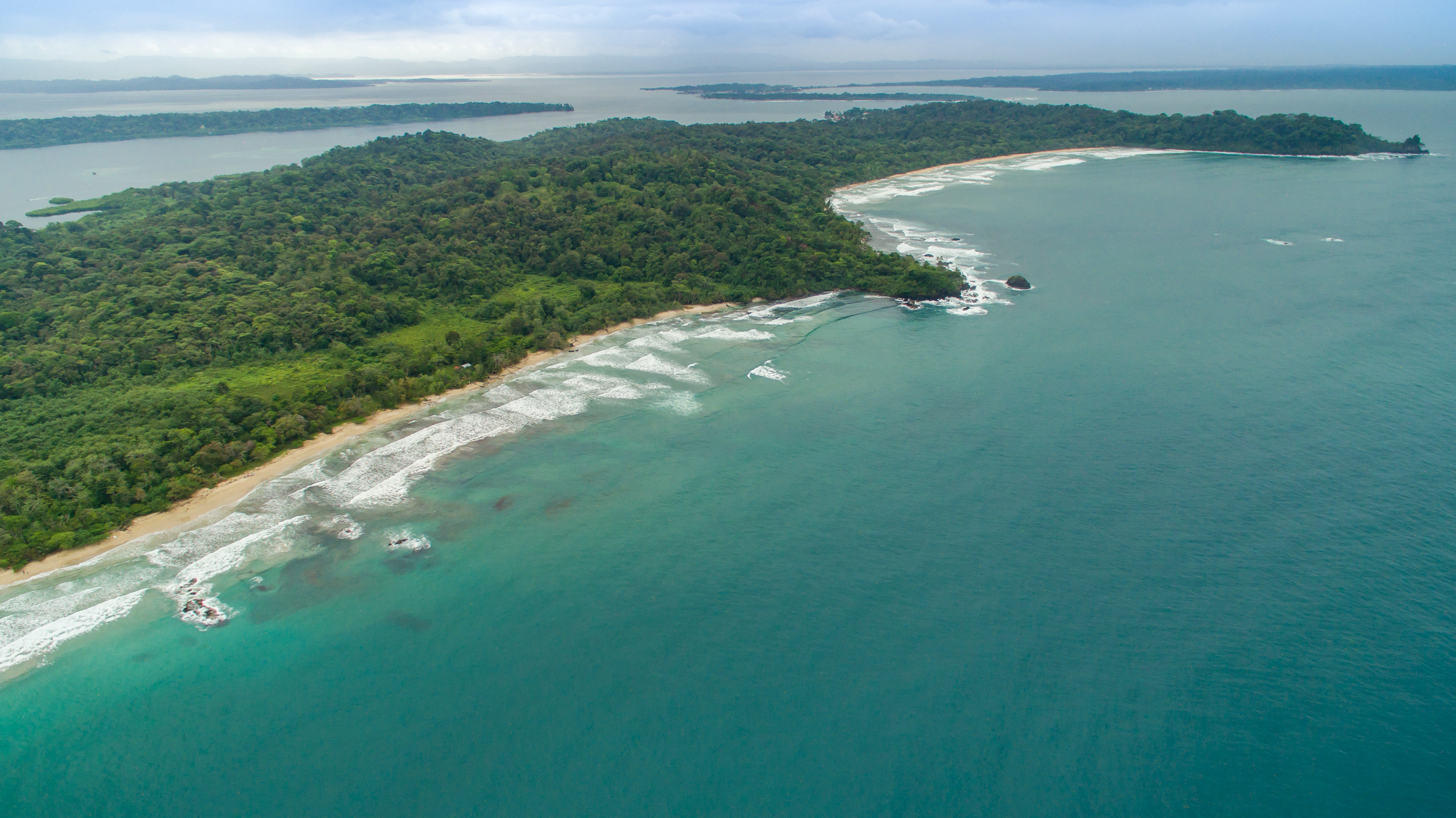
The series was filmed in the islands of the Bocas del Toro Archipelago of Panama

Challenge winners and eliminations by episode
| Episode | | Challenge winner(s) | | Eliminated | |
| No. | Air date | Reward | Immunity | Tribe | Player |
|---|---|---|---|---|---|
| 1 | 13 March 2002 | North Island (Note: Combined reward and immunity challenge.) (Note: Although South Island finished first, one of their tribe members failed to complete the obstacle course, resulting in them being disqualified, and North Island winning the challenge.) | | South Island | Sarah |
| 2 | 20 March 2002 | North Island | North Island | South Island | Lee |
| 3 | 27 March 2002 | South Island | South Island | North Island | Tayfun |
| 4 | 3 April 2002 | South Island | South Island | North Island | Meeta |
| 5 | 10 April 2002 | Drew, Susannah | None (Note: No vote occurred. The Day 16 Tribal Council was used to reveal the British public's jury vote.) | | |
| 6 | 17 April 2002 | Drew | Jonny | Columbus | Helen |
| 7 | 24 April 2002 | John [Bridget] | John | Columbus | Alastair |
| 8 | 1 May 2002 | Jonny, Drew | Dave | Columbus | Drew |
| 9 | 8 May 2002 | John | Jonny | Columbus | Dave |
| 10 | 15 May 2002 | John, Jonny, Susannah | John | Columbus | Bridget |
| 11 | 22 May 2002 | Susannah | Susannah | Columbus | John |

== Voting history ==
| | Original tribes | | | | Merged tribe | | | | | | | |
| Episode | 1 | 2 | 3 | 4 | 6 | | | 7 | 8 | 9 | 10 | 11 |
|---|---|---|---|---|---|---|---|---|---|---|---|---|
| Day | 4 | 7 | 10 | 13 | 20 | | | 23 | 26 | 29 | 32 | 35 |
| Tribe | South | South | North | North | Columbus | | | Columbus | Columbus | Columbus | Columbus | Columbus |
| Eliminated | Sarah | Lee | Tayfun | Meeta | Tie (Note: The first Tribal Council vote resulted in a tie. Per the rules, a second vote was held where the castaways involved in the tie would not vote and the remaining castaways could only vote for the two tied.) | Tie (Note: As the second Tribal Council vote remained a tie, there was a challenge between Bridget and Helen in order to stay in the game. Bridget won, therefore, Helen was eliminated.) | Helen | Alastair | Drew | Dave | Bridget | John |
| Vote | 5–1 | 4–1 | 5–1 | 4–1 | 4–4 | 3–3 | Challenge | 4–3 | 4–2 | 4–1 | 3–1 | 1–0 |
| Voter | Votes | | | | | | | | | | | |
| Jonny | Sarah | Lee | | | Helen | Helen | | Alastair | Drew | Dave | Bridget | None (Note: John and Jonny were not eligible to vote as the only eligible players they could vote for were each other.) |
| Susannah | Sarah | Lee | | | Helen | Helen | | Alastair | Drew | Dave | Bridget | John |
| John | Sarah | Lee | | | Helen | Helen | | Alastair | Drew | Dave | Bridget | None |
| Bridget | Sarah | Lee | | | Helen | None (Note: Bridget and Helen were not eligible to vote in the second round of voting.) | Won | Alastair | Drew | Dave | Susannah | |
| Dave | | | Tayfun | Meeta | Bridget | Bridget | | Susannah | Susannah | Bridget | | |
| Drew | | | Tayfun | Meeta | Bridget | Bridget | | Susannah | Susannah | | | |
| Alastair | | | Tayfun | Meeta | Bridget | Bridget | | Susannah | | | | |
| Helen | | | Tayfun | Meeta | Bridget | None | Lost | | | | | |
| Meeta | | | Tayfun | Helen | | | | | | | | |
| Tayfun | | | Meeta | | | | | | | | | |
| Lee | Sarah | Bridget | | | | | | | | | | |
| Sarah | John | | | | | | | | | | | |

Jury vote
| Episode | 12 | |
|---|---|---|
| Day | 37 | |
| Finalist | Jonny | Susannah |
| Votes | 7–0 | |
| Juror | Vote | |
| John | Yes | |
| Bridget | Yes | |
| Dave | Yes | |
| Drew | Yes | |
| Alastair | Yes | |
| Helen | Yes | |
| British public (Note: Jonny won the British public's jury vote, receiving 89% of the vote. Susannah received 11% of the vote.) | Yes | |
