= Survivor (British TV series) series 3 =

Third series of British television series

Survivor
- Series 3
- Promotional poster
- Presented by: Joel Dommett
- No. of days: 34
- No. of castaways: 18
- Winner: Matthew Haywood
- Runners-up: Christopher Haul; Leilani Sen
- Location: Puerto Plata, Dominican Republic
- No. of episodes: 16

Release
- Original network: BBC One
- Original release: 28 October – 16 December 2023

Additional information
- Filming dates: Summer 2023

Series chronology
- ← Previous; Survivor: Panama (on ITV)

Survivor (British series 3), also known as Survivor 2023 or simply Survivor, is the first and only series of the competitive reality television series Survivor on the BBC. The series was filmed in the Summer of 2023 and began airing in October of the same year. The series began with the 18 contestants being marooned on two remote beaches in the María Trinidad Sánchez Province in the Dominican Republic. Hosted by comedian Joel Dommett, it consisted of 16 episodes following the 34 days of the series, with one contestant being eliminated by a majority vote per episode, and the winner being awarded a grand prize of £100,000.

Now airing on BBC One and BBC iPlayer, the series was a continuation of the British edition of the Survivor franchise following a lengthy hiatus after the first and second series failed to live up to the critical praise, commercial success and cultural impact of the early seasons of the American version when they aired in the early 2000s, as they received mostly negative reviews and lower ratings than expected after airing on ITV.

The contestants were initially separated into two tribes, Caletón and La Nena, each named after the names of the beaches they were on. When 11 players remained, the contestants merged into one tribe, Calena, a portmanteau of the original two tribe names. The series was won by Matthew Haywood, defeating Christopher Haul and Leilani Sen in a 6–1–1 jury vote to earn the title of Sole Survivor and be awarded the £100,000 grand prize.

== Production ==
Following the Banijay Group's acquisition of Castaway Productions, who own the Survivor format, it was said in 2017 that the company were looking to revive Survivor in the UK. Banijay's CEO Peter Langenberg spoke to Broadcast about the potential return, stating that RDF, the largest UK production company within Banijay, is attempting to rekindle interest in the format amongst broadcasters. He explained: "Having hands on the format means we can polish it and come up with Survivor 2.0, because it needs a refresh".

Reports began circulating again in 2022 that the series would be revived, this time with BBC One said to be the potential new home of the series. Broadcast reported that the revival deal for Survivor is "on the brink", and that if the deal is finalised, the third series of the programme will be filmed in 2023 with thirteen episodes. Digital Spy's Daniel Kilkelly put forward his hopes for a revival of the programme. He felt that the key reasons for the series' initial failure lay with having a pre-recorded format which meant that viewers had no say into the events of the series. However, Kilkelly opined that the success of The Apprentice and The Great British Bake Off, both of which use pre-recorded formats, suggested that the British audience would now be ready to support a Survivor format. In September 2022, it was confirmed that Remarkable Entertainment (a subsidiary of Banijay) would produce a new series and would air on BBC One in 2023 consisting of 16 episodes. The season was then announced to be filmed in the Dominican Republic on a beach called Playa Caleton, a location where no other Survivor season had ever shot before. The temperatures were able to reach as high as 34 degrees.

Contestant applications opened on 24 November. When casting, thousands from around the UK were in consideration but it was narrowed down to 18 for the final cast of the season. With the announcement of the application process, the prize of £100,000 was revealed. On 17 February 2023, Joel Dommett was confirmed as host of the revival, which he was excited about, stating "I’m the new host of the UK’s Survivor! I can't believe it! A huge thank you to the BBC for trusting me with this".

=== International airing ===
The series aired on 10Play in Australia, with episodes available on a Sunday and Monday at 8:30pm AEDT, and in New Zealand on TVNZ+.

== Cancellation ==
In August 2024, it was reported that Survivor had been axed after just one series due to a struggle in ratings.

== Contestants ==
The season's cast was composed of 18 players from around the United Kingdom, divided into two tribes: La Nena and Caletón, both named after beaches in the Dominican Republic. Notable figures on the cast included footballer Hannah Baptiste, boxer Lee Reeves, ex-popstar Leilani Sen, and surfing instructor Pegleg Bennett.

List of Survivor 2023 contestants
Contestant	Age	Residence	Tribe				Finish	
Contestant	Age	Residence	Original	First switch	Second switch	Merged	Placement	Day
Richard Kinnear McKell	36	Dalkeith, Scotland	Caletón				1st voted out	Day 2
Sabrina Pace-Humphreys	45	Stroud, England	La Nena				2nd voted out	Day 5
Rachel "Rach" Carstairs	23	Glasgow, Scotland	La Nena				3rd voted out	Day 7
Rachel Golding	40	Whitstable, England	Caletón	Caletón			4th voted out	Day 13
Ren Elvidge	28	London, England	La Nena	La Nena	La Nena		5th voted out	Day 15
Jess Woburn	38	London, England	Caletón	Caletón	Caletón		6th voted out	Day 17
Shai Ravindra	33	London, England	Caletón	Caletón	Caletón		7th voted out	Day 18
Lee Reeves	28	Belfast, Northern Ireland	La Nena	La Nena	La Nena	Calena	8th voted out 1st jury member	Day 20
Ashleigh Bishop	34	London, England	La Nena	La Nena	La Nena	Calena	9th voted out 2nd jury member	Day 21
Doug Swinbanks	32	Isle of Mull, Scotland	La Nena	La Nena	Caletón	Calena	10th voted out 3rd jury member	Day 24
Tinuke Oyediran	30	London, England	Caletón	Caletón	La Nena	Calena	11th voted out 4th jury member	Day 26
Laurence-Maximilian Cardwell	29	London, England	Caletón	Caletón	Caletón	Calena	12th voted out 5th jury member	Day 28
Nathan Dyke	35	Manchester, England	Caletón	Caletón	Caletón	Calena	13th voted out 6th jury member	Day 30
Pegleg Bennett	54	St Agnes, England	La Nena	La Nena	Caletón	Calena	14th voted out 7th jury member	Day 32
Hannah Baptiste	30	London, England	La Nena	La Nena	La Nena	Calena	15th voted out 8th jury member	Day 33
Christopher Haul	36	Bridgend, Wales	La Nena	La Nena	La Nena	Calena	Co-runners-up	Day 34
Leilani Sen	45	Hertford, England	Caletón	La Nena	La Nena	Calena	Co-runners-up	Day 34
Matthew Haywood	21	Workington, England	Caletón	Caletón	La Nena	Calena	Sole Survivor	Day 34

== Season summary ==
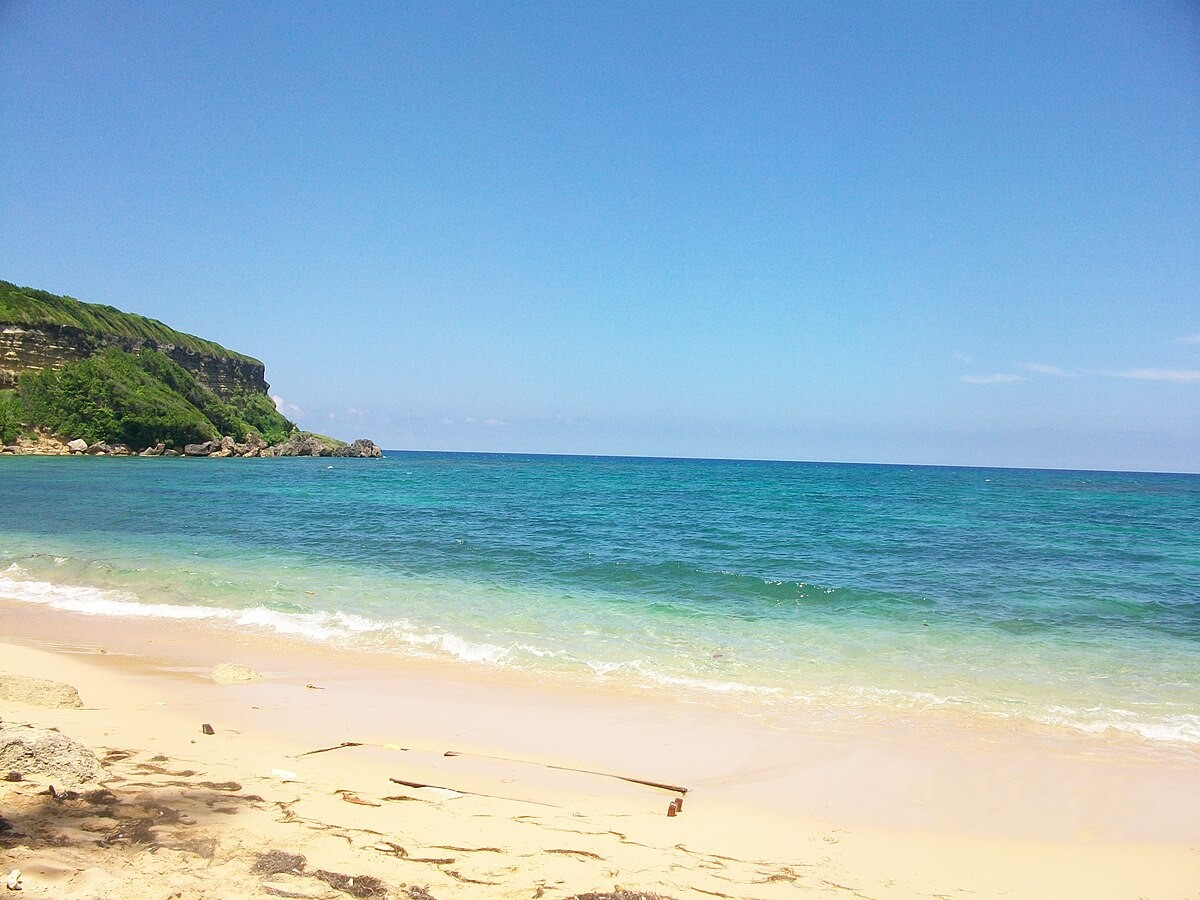
The series was filmed on the island of Playa Caleton, Dominican Republic

In the beginning, 18 contestants were divided into two tribes – Caletón and La Nena. Though La Nena fared slightly stronger in challenges, both tribes kept an even number of members during the early phase of the game. They differed on reasons why they voted people out of the game as Caletón prioritized challenge strength, while La Nena tended to vote people out based on their social skills. On Day 10, Leilani was voted out of Caletón but instead of being eliminated, she was sent to La Nena – the series' first tribe switch.

Shortly after, there was a second tribe switch in which two members from each tribe changed. As a result of this switch, Caletón started to lose frequently. However, Doug and Pegleg, who were new to the tribe, managed to survive the votes by forming strong relationships with the original Caletón members.

On Day 19, the two tribes merged into Calena. Despite planning an alliance, the original La Nena members proved to be too dysfunctional to work together, causing multiple schemes that resulted in the elimination of original La Nena member Lee. Consensus targets Ashleigh and Doug were then targeted and voted out – both of whom originated from La Nena, giving original Caletón the lead in numbers. Sensing trouble, outsider Christopher convinced ex-Caletón member Matthew to flip on his alliance by telling him he was at the bottom of it and that Tinuke was running it. The plan worked and the flip initiated a streak of Caletón members being eliminated.

The final 6 of the series was divided into three tight duos: Christopher and Matthew, Nathan and Leilani, and Hannah and Pegleg. Each duo was fighting for the votes of another to gain a majority, resulting in Hannah and Pegleg being the swing vote. Ultimately, they chose to vote out Nathan alongside Christopher and Matthew. Christopher and Matthew then used this to their advantage by recruiting Leilani into their alliance and voting out Pegleg and Hannah as revenge at the final 4 and 5 respectively, making them the final 3 contestants.

During the Final Tribal Council, the jury mostly discarded Leilani's gameplay, considering it incompetent. Christopher received mixed reactions from them for his frantic gameplay and shaky relationships but was praised for his challenge ability. On the other hand, Matthew's well-timed gameplay decisions and strategic use of his young age to be underestimated was applauded by the jury, which led them to award him the win in a 6–1–1 vote.

Challenge winners and eliminations by episode
Episode			Challenge Winner(s)		Eliminated	
No.	BBC iPlayer Release	BBC One Broadcast	Reward	Immunity	Tribe	Player
1	28 October 2023		La Nena	La Nena	Caletón	Richard
2	28 October 2023	29 October 2023	La Nena	Caletón	La Nena	Sabrina
3	4 November 2023		None	Caletón	La Nena	Rach
4	4 November 2023	5 November 2023	Caletón	La Nena	None	
5	11 November 2023		Tie (Note: In the final round, Christopher and Rachel both received injuries causing Joel to stop the challenge. Both tribes were eventually awarded the prize for the challenge winners.)	La Nena	Caletón	Rachel
6	11 November 2023	12 November 2023	None	Caletón	La Nena	Ren
7	18 November 2023		La Nena	La Nena	Caletón	Jess
8	18 November 2023	19 November 2023	None	La Nena	Caletón	Shai
9	25 November 2023		Survivor Auction	Doug	Calena	Lee
10	25 November 2023	26 November 2023	None	Pegleg	Calena	Ashleigh
11	2 December 2023		Christopher, Doug, Matthew, Tinuke; Pegleg (Note: Pegleg was not selected for a team, however he correctly guessed the winning team, and he joined them on reward.)	Tinuke	Calena	Doug
12	2 December 2023	3 December 2023	Christopher, Matthew [Laurence]	Laurence	Calena	Tinuke
13	9 December 2023		None	Christopher	Calena	Laurence
14	9 December 2023	10 December 2023	Christopher [Hannah, Pegleg]	Pegleg	Calena	Nathan
15	16 December 2023		None	Christopher	Calena	Pegleg
16	16 December 2023		None	Christopher	Calena	Hannah

In the case of multiple tribes or castaways who win reward or immunity, they are listed in order of finish, or alphabetically where it was a team effort; where one castaway won and invited others, the invitees are in brackets.

== Episodes ==
No. overall	No. in series	Title	Timeline	BBC One airdate	BBC iPlayer release	UK viewers (millions)	Weekly Rank
27	1	"Episode 1"	Days 1–2	28 October 2023	28 October 2023	3.16	#35
28	2	"Episode 2"	Days 3–5	29 October 2023	28 October 2023	2.89	#43
29	3	"Episode 3"	Days 6–7	4 November 2023	4 November 2023	<(2.79)	N/A
30	4	"Episode 4"	Days 8–10	5 November 2023	4 November 2023	<(2.79)	N/A
31	5	"Episode 5"	Days 11–13	11 November 2023	11 November 2023	2.90	#45
32	6	"Episode 6"	Days 14–15	12 November 2023	11 November 2023	2.83	#47
33	7	"Episode 7"	Days 16–17	18 November 2023	18 November 2023	<(2.79)	N/A
34	8	"Episode 8"	Day 18	19 November 2023	18 November 2023	<(2.79)	N/A
35	9	"Episode 9"	Days 19–20	25 November 2023	25 November 2023	<(2.77)	N/A
36	10	"Episode 10"	Day 21	26 November 2023	25 November 2023	<(2.77)	N/A
37	11	"Episode 11"	Days 22–24	2 December 2023	2 December 2023	<(2.70)	N/A
38	12	"Episode 12"	Days 25–26	3 December 2023	2 December 2023	<(2.70)	N/A
39	13	"Episode 13"	Days 27–28	9 December 2023	9 December 2023	<(2.80)	N/A
40	14	"Episode 14"	Days 29–30	10 December 2023	9 December 2023	<(2.80)	N/A
41	15	"The Finals – Part 1"	Days 31–32	16 December 2023	16 December 2023	2.57	#49
42	16	"The Finals – Part 2"	Days 33–34	16 December 2023	16 December 2023	3.01	#36

== Voting history ==
	Original Tribes				First switch	Second switch			Merged Tribe								
Episode	1	2	3	4	5	6	7	8	9	10	11		12	13	14	15	16
Day	2	5	7	10	13	15	17	18	20	21	24		26	28	30	32	33
Tribe	Caletón	La Nena	La Nena	Caletón	Caletón	La Nena	Caletón	Caletón	Calena	Calena	Calena		Calena	Calena	Calena	Calena	Calena
Eliminated	Richard	Sabrina	Rach	Leilani (Note: Before voting, Caletón were informed that the person voted out would not be eliminated, and instead would switch tribes and join La Nena. Leilani joined La Nena after being voted out.)	Rachel	Ren	Jess	Shai	Lee	Ashleigh	Doug		Tinuke	Laurence	Nathan	Pegleg	Hannah
Vote	7–1–1	5–2–2	5–3	7–1	5–2	5–2–1	4–2	3–2	7–4	4–2–0 (Note: Christopher played a hidden immunity idol on himself; therefore, 4 votes cast against him did not count.)	5–3–2		4–3–1	5–1–1	4–2	4–1	3–1
Voter	Votes																
Matthew	Richard			Leilani	Rachel	Ren			Lee	~~Christopher~~	Doug		Tinuke	Laurence	Nathan	Pegleg	Hannah
Christopher		Sabrina	Rach			Ren			Lee	Nathan	Leilani	Leilani (Note: Christopher played an extra vote advantage, allowing him to cast two votes.)	Tinuke	Laurence	Nathan	Pegleg	Hannah
Leilani	Richard			Rachel		Ren			Lee	Ashleigh	Doug		Christopher	Pegleg	Christopher	Pegleg	Hannah
Hannah		Ashleigh	Rach			Ashleigh			Ashleigh	Ashleigh	Christopher		Tinuke	Laurence	Nathan	Pegleg	Leilani
Pegleg		Rach	Ashleigh				Jess	Shai	Ashleigh	~~Christopher~~	Christopher		Tinuke	Laurence	Nathan	Matthew	
Nathan	Richard			Leilani	Rachel		Doug	Shai	Lee	Ashleigh	Doug		Christopher	Laurence	Christopher		
Laurence	Richard			Leilani	Rachel		Jess	Nathan	Lee	~~Christopher~~	Doug		Pegleg	Hannah			
Tinuke	Richard			Leilani	Rachel	Ren			Lee	~~Christopher~~	Doug		Christopher				
Doug		Sabrina	Rach				Jess	Shai	Ashleigh	Ashleigh	Christopher						
Ashleigh		Sabrina	Rach			Ren			Lee	Nathan							
Lee		Rach	Ashleigh			Leilani			Ashleigh								
Shai	Richard			Leilani	Rachel		Jess	Nathan									
Jess	Shai			Leilani	Laurence		Doug										
Ren		Sabrina	Rach			Ashleigh											
Rachel	Richard			Leilani	Laurence												
Rach		Sabrina	Ashleigh														
Sabrina		Ashleigh															
Richard	Leilani																

Jury vote
Episode	16		
Day	34		
Finalist	Matthew	Christopher	Leilani
Vote	6–1–1		
Juror	Votes		
Hannah	Yes		
Pegleg	Yes		
Nathan	Yes		
Laurence	Yes		
Tinuke			Yes
Doug	Yes		
Ashleigh		Yes	
Lee	Yes		

== Reception ==
=== Critical response ===
Survivor 2023 initially received mixed-to-negative reviews but they grew far more positive over the course of its run. Initially negative reception was targeted at its music, the cast, and Joel Dommett as host. Aine Toner of Belfast Telegraph was underwhelmed by the series, writing "Joel Dommett christens Survivor the ‘most emotionally draining game on TV’ – I’d give Tipping Point that honour." Helen Fear of Entertainment Daily was heavily critical of the series' host, writing "Joel Dommett is just wrong for this show. He needs to drop the dad jokes, and the awful puns. Where’s the tension?" and its Tribal Council's, writing "the tribal councils are plodding, and drawn-out. There was no suspense or tension. There was no humour or personality. Instead, it was a predictable vote." In a mixed review, Rebecca Nicholson of The Guardian wrote "It isn’t a reinvention of the wheel, then, but it is an enjoyable and comfortingly recognisable trip to the beach."

Later reviews of the series were generally positive, praising the gameplay of its final players and its entertaining moments. Adam Miller of Metro warmed up to the series, writing: "Survivor just gets so much better once you’ve got through the first few episodes. I’m completely hooked. You need to invest in the first few slow episodes while learning names and whatnot but these latest episodes are absolutely electric."

=== Ratings ===
The revival series received underwhelming ratings compared its high budget, earning a fraction of the viewership of series 21 of Strictly Come Dancing, the show which aired before it on BBC One, causing crisis talks to ponder on how to improve the series' viewership.

== See also ==
- Survivor (British TV series)
