= Hannah Baptiste =

Guyanese footballer

- Born: Streatham, England
- Education: St. Andrews University; Richmond American University London
- Occupation: Footballer
- Television: Survivor 2023
Association football career
- Position: Midfielder
Team information
- Current team: Sutton United; Guyana women's national football team

Hannah Baptiste is a footballer who plays as a midfielder for Sutton United. Born in England, she represents the Guyana women's national team.

== Early life ==
Baptiste is a native of Streatham, England.

== Education ==
Baptiste attended St. Andrews University in the United States, but transferred to Richmond American University London in England due to homesickness.

== Career ==
Baptiste played for the Guyana women's national football team.

== Style of play ==
Baptiste mainly operates as a midfielder.

== Personal life ==
Baptiste is eligible to represent the Guyana women's national football team through her grandparents.

== Survivor ==
Baptiste competed in the third series of Survivor UK. and reached day 33, coming in 4th place and being the final jury member, voting for Matthew Haywood (eventual winner) to win the series.
