= Zoe Lyons =

British comedian (born 1971)

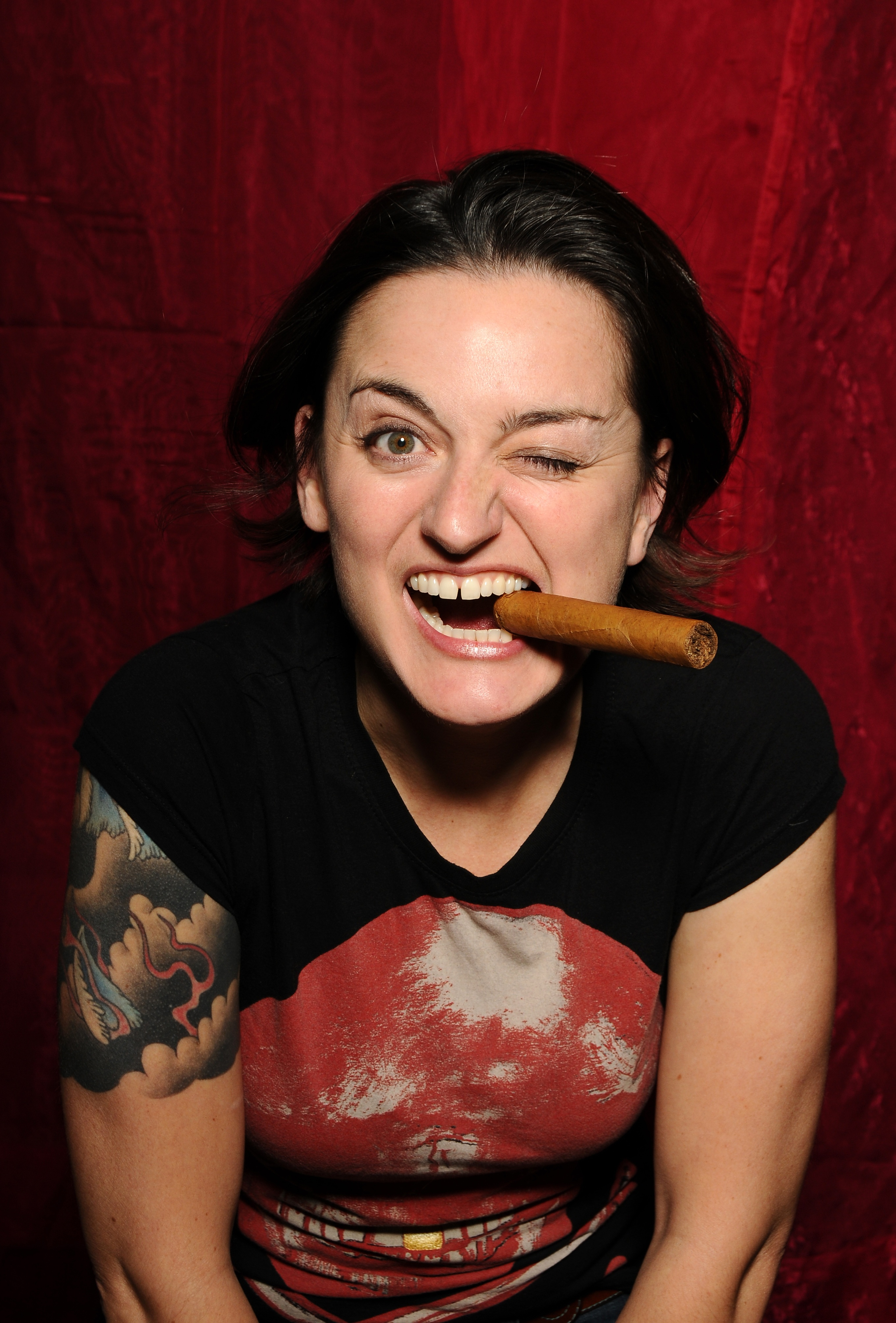
- Lyons in 2009
- Born: Zoe Ann Lyons; 3 October 1971 (age 55); Haverfordwest, Wales, UK
- Education: University of York; The Poor School
- Notable work: Mock the Week; Survivor

Comedy career
- Years active: 2001–present
- Medium: Stand-up comedy, radio and television
- Genre: Observational comedy
- Website: www.zoelyons.co.uk

Zoe Ann Lyons (born 3 October 1971) is a British comedian and TV presenter.

== Early and personal life ==
Lyons was born to an Irish father and an English mother in Haverfordwest, Pembrokeshire, Wales. Her family soon moved to Ireland, where she attended a Catholic primary school in Dunmore East in County Waterford. The family then moved to Clonmel, County Tipperary, to Epsom, Surrey, when Lyons was nine, and then to Glasgow.

Her first job was in a jam factory in Glasgow. Lyons lives in Brighton with her partner Sindy, a nurse, originally from the Netherlands, who is 14 years her senior. The two met around the year 2000 whilst on holiday on the Isle of Lesbos, through mutual friends.

Lyons shared an Instagram post in 2020 about her alopecia in the hope that it would help "someone even just a little bit".

== Career ==
Lyons graduated from the University of York in 1992 with a degree in psychology. Soon making the decision to become a performer, she moved to London, and trained at The Poor School, thereafter working as a waitress while seeking acting roles and attending stand-up comedy performances.

She appeared on the ITV reality game show Survivor in 2001, in its first series, placing 6th out of 16 contestants.

In 2004, Lyons won the Funny Women Awards. Since then, she has toured the British stand-up circuit, as well as playing regular gigs in London and Brighton. In 2007, her debut solo show, "Fight or Flight", was nominated for the best newcomer award at the Edinburgh Fringe Festival. In 2008, her second solo show, "Mangled Mantra of the Messed up Modern Mind", featured a joke mocking singer Amy Winehouse which was awarded digital television channel Dave's Funniest Joke of the Fringe.

Lyons featured in The Independent's tenth annual Pink List for 2009, detailing the 101 most influential lesbian and gay people in Britain. Lyons was placed at number 81.

In 2011, as part of her second international tour, Lyons was invited to perform "Clownbusting" at the Melbourne Comedy Festival in Australia. Reviews were favourable, with a critic from Australian Stage reporting: "I have renewed faith in stand-up comedy after seeing British comedian Zoe Lyons. 'Clownbusting' is a magnificently written and delivered show which holds from start to finish."

== Television and radio ==
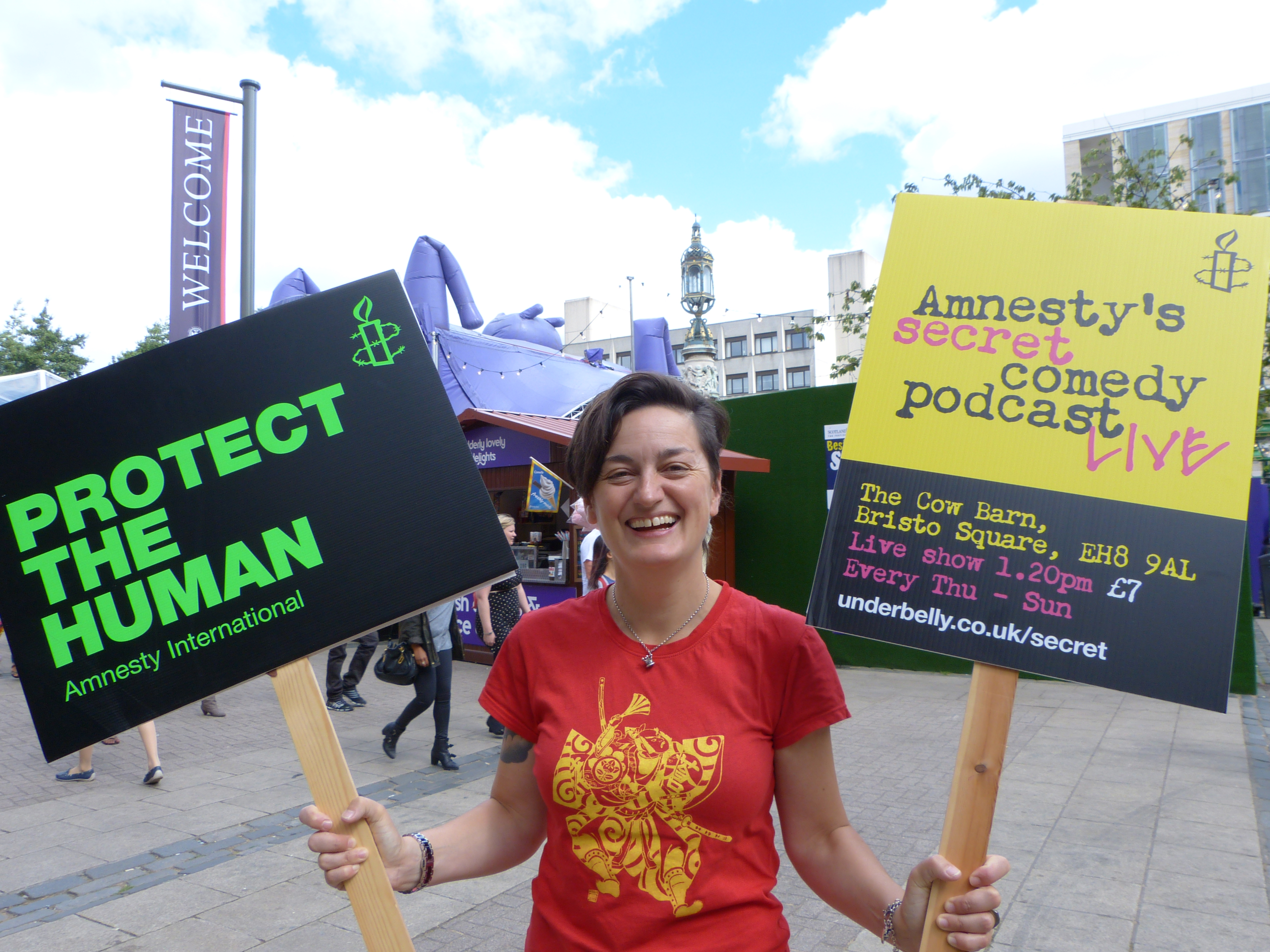
Lyons holding Amnesty International placards in 2013

Lyons' television credits include appearances on Mock the Week, Michael McIntyre's Comedy Roadshow, The Paul O'Grady Show, The Wright Stuff (as a regular guest panellist), Room 101, Dave's One Night Stand and QI.

Her radio appearances have included Clive Anderson's Chat Room (BBC Radio 2), PMQ with Andy Parsons (BBC Radio 4), 4 Stands Up (BBC Radio 4), The Jon Richardson Show (BBC 6 Music), The Christian O'Connell Solution (BBC Radio 5 Live), Jo Caulfield Won't Shut Up (BBC Radio 4) and The Unbelievable Truth (BBC Radio 4).

From 2018, Lyons has appeared in Tui adverts on Sky One, alongside fellow comedian Mark Watson.

In 2021, Lyons hosted her own teatime TV quiz show, Lightning, on BBC Two, as well as Stand Up and Deliver on Channel 4, where she mentored Katie McGlynn.

== Awards ==
- Winner, London Awards for Art and Performance: Comedy, 2011
- Nominated, Dave's Joke of the Fringe, 2009
- Winner, Dave's Joke of the Fringe, 2008
- Nominated, Best Newcomer, if.comedy Awards, 2007
- Winner, Funny Women Awards, 2004
- Finalist, 'So You Think You're Funny', 2004
