= Pegleg Bennett =

British lifeguard, surfer, and reality television contestant

Personal information
- Born: Rick Bennett; 1969 (age 56–57) Essex

Surfing career
- Sport: Surfing

Pegleg Bennett (born 1969) is a British lifeguard and professional big wave surfer. He also appeared on Survivor 2023.

== Surfing career ==
Bennett was a strong swimmer as a child, learning to surf at age 17. He found success in surfing so began competing internationally. In 2018, Bennett represented England in the Adapted World Championships in La Jolla, placing 6th.

Pegleg Bennett competed in the 2021 AmpSurf ISA World Para Surfing Championships representing England, the highest-level contest for para/adaptive surfing. England went on to place 7th, Pegleg making it to the semi-finals of his division.

Bennett also works as a surfing instructor.

== Personal life ==
Born as Rick Bennett in 1969, Bennett was born without an ankle in his left leg, and as a result it was amputated when he was 13 months old. He went by the nickname Pegleg throughout his childhood, eventually making the decision to make it his legal name in 2016. Bennett resides in St Agnes in Cornwall, England. He is married and has children and grandchildren.

== Survivor ==
In October 2023, Bennett was announced as one of the 18 contestants chosen to compete on Survivor 2023, missing 3 competitions to compete. He was voted out on day 32, earning 5th place becoming the 7th jury member. He voted for Matthew Haywood to win the season, which he did in a 6–1–1 vote.

== Other appearances ==
In 2018, Pegleg appeared in an episode of George Clarke's Amazing Spaces, living in a van. Pegleg is an ambassador for Dryrobe.
