= Lee Reeves =

Lee Reeves may refer to:

- Lee Reeves (boxer) (1995–2026), Irish boxer
- Lee Reeves (politician) (born 1977), American politician
