= A Lot of Hard Yakka =

- Author: Simon Hughes
- Language: English
- Publisher: Headline Book Publishing
- Publication date: 1997
- Publication place: United Kingdom
- Pages: 320
- ISBN: 978-0747255161
- Preceded by: From Minor to Major (1992)
- Followed by: Yakking Around the World: A Cricketer's Quest for Love and Utopia (2001)

A Lot of Hard Yakka, subtitled "Triumph and torment: a county cricketer's life", is the first volume of autobiography by the cricketer-journalist Simon Hughes, and the William Hill Sports Book of the Year for 1997, making it the first volume on cricket thus to be feted. Its success, as surmised by Leslie Thomas in a review for Wisden Cricketers' Almanack, "came more than a little to the author's surprise":

I mentioned to Hughes that I had enjoyed his tale of a cricketer's beginnings, his life in and out of the game, and his eventual departure from it, but that I thought it was a terrible title. Amiable chap that he is, he agreed. Yakka is an Australianism, meaning work, endeavour, experience (I think) [.... ] it makes a breezy and irreverent read.

Written in a droll and self-deprecating and often colloquial style, the book is now widely esteemed a genre classic, having earned kudos from such critics as Michael Parkinson and Ian Wooldridge, and served to promote Hughes's now-established career in sports journalism. It has a sequel entitled Yakking Around the World.
