= Cricket on 5 =

- Presented by: Mark Nicholas
- Country of origin: United Kingdom

Production
- Running time: 58 mins (2012-Sept 2019) 43 minutes (2006-2011)

Original release
- Network: Channel 5
- Release: May 2006 – September 15, 2019

Cricket on 5 was a UK television programme on Channel 5 showing highlights of England's Test cricket, One Day Internationals (ODI) and Twenty20 Internationals (T20I). The programme was produced by Sunset & Vine.

== Background ==
In December 2004, it was announced that Channel 4 would lose the broadcasting rights to live broadcasts of Test cricket after the end of the 2005 Ashes, with live coverage being awarded to Sky Sports exclusively. Prior to the announcement, the England and Wales Cricket Board (ECB) had been expected to share the rights between Sky and Channel 4, but ultimately awarded the contract exclusively to Sky Sports.

Concurrently, the ECB announced that Channel 5 had gained the broadcast rights to highlights of all test, ODI and T20I cricket. However, unlike the coverage by Channel 4, the contract did not include coverage of domestic cricket (County Cricket, or T20 Finals' Day). Channel 5 was the only broadcaster to bid for the rights to the highlights despite not having broadcast cricket previously. In 2012, Channel 5 extended its contract until 2017. This was subsequently extended by a further two years, until 2019, after which highlights and additional rights were transferred to the BBC.

== Team ==
- Mark Nicholas (2006–2019)
- Geoffrey Boycott (2006–2019)
- Simon Hughes (2006–2017)
- Michael Vaughan (2009–2019)
- Alec Stewart (2007–2009)
- Alison Mitchell (2018–2019)

Cricket on 5 initially took most of the personnel from Channel 4, keeping award-winning anchor Mark Nicholas along with analysts Simon Hughes and Geoffrey Boycott. The commentating team usually included a fourth commentator from the opposing country, for example Ian Bishop when England took on the West Indies and Matthew Hayden when England took on Australia. For the 2009 Ashes series, legendary Australian commentator, Richie Benaud joined the team. Former England captain Michael Vaughan joined the show in 2010. Sunil Gavaskar and Sourav Ganguly joined the team when India toured England in 2018, and Mitchell Johnson and Mike Hussey joined the team for the 2019 Ashes series.

== Running time ==
Initially, from 2006 to 2011, the programme was broadcast between 7.15 pm to 8 pm (45 minute running time).

After 2011, the show was broadcast from 7 pm to 8 pm (60 minute runtime), which allowed for more coverage once advertisement breaks had been accounted for.

For a day/night game, coverage was shown at 12 am – 1 am.

== Production ==
Cricket on 5 was produced by Sunset & Vine, a specialist sports production company who also produced award-winning live coverage of England Test matches on Channel 4 from 1999 to 2005.

== End ==
In June 2017 it was announced that BBC Sport had secured the rights to be the free-to-air partner of the ECB from 2020. The BBC will cover 11 live matches from The Hundred, 8 matches from the women's domestic T20 competition, 2 Live England Men's T20 Internationals, and 2 Live Women's T20 Internationals. The BBC also secured the rights held by Channel 5 and will cover highlights of England Men's & Women's teams Test Matches, ODI, and T20 internationals alongside live radio rights and clip rights for the BBC Sport website.

The final episode of Cricket on 5 highlighted England's win at the last Ashes test of the 2019 Ashes series. The programme ended with all members of the presenting team in front of the camera, thanking the viewers, and ending the association of Channel 5 with cricket. England Captain Joe Root also thanked Channel 5 for their support over 13 years.
