= Fred Nicholas =

English footballer

Personal information
- Full name: Frederick William Herbert Nicholas
- Born: 25 July 1893; Kuala Lumpur, Selangor
- Died: 20 October 1962 (aged 69); Kensington, London, England
- Batting: Right-handed
- Role: Wicketkeeper-batsman

Domestic team information
- Years: Team
- 1912–1929: Essex

Career statistics
Competition	First-class
Matches	76
Runs scored	2634
Batting average	22.51
100s/50s	1/20
Top score	140
Catches/stumpings	51/16
- Source: CricketArchive, 9 August 2017

Frederick William Herbert Nicholas (25 July 1893 – 20 October 1962) was an English first-class cricketer who played for Essex County Cricket Club in a first-class career that spanned from 1912 to 1929. He toured South Africa with S. B. Joel's team in 1924–25.

Nicholas also played association football as a forward for Great Britain at the 1920 Olympics and for the Corinthian club, for whom he scored 28 goals in 54 appearances.

The cricketer and broadcaster Mark Nicholas is his grandson.
