= Survivor (British TV series) series 1 =

Survivor
- Series 1
- Presented by: Mark Austin; John Leslie
- No. of days: 40
- No. of castaways: 16
- Winner: Charlotte Hoborough
- Runner-up: Jackie Carey
- Location: Pulau Tiga, Sabah, Malaysia
- No. of episodes: 14

Release
- Original network: ITV
- Original release: 21 May – 25 July 2001

Season chronology
- Next → Survivor: Panama

The first series of Survivor, commonly referred to as Survivor: Pulau Tiga, premiered on 21 May 2001 and ran until 25 July 2001. The series was presented by journalist Mark Austin, who was on location with the contestants, and television presenter John Leslie, who conducted exit interviews with the players and presented additional footage of events. It consisted of 40 days of gameplay with 16 castaways competing for a prize of £1,000,000.

The series was set in the South China Sea on the remote Malaysian island of Pulau Tiga in the state of Sabah, about 6 miles (9.7 km) off the north coast of Borneo, Malaysia. The sixteen contestants were initially separated into two tribes, named Helang and Ular, meaning "eagle" and "snake" in Malaysian, respectively. On Day 20, the ten remaining players merged into one tribe, named Sekutu, the Malaysian word for "together". The final nine players remaining made up the final two players and the seven members of the jury, who ultimately decided who would be the "Ultimate Survivor". After 40 days of competition, police officer Charlotte Hoborough was named the "Ultimate Survivor", defeating airline industry purchaser Jackie Carey in a 7–0 jury vote.

== Production ==
The series premiered on ITV on 21 May 2001. The programme initially aired 4 times a week. An hour-long show aired on Mondays and Wednesdays which showed the highlights from the island with presenter Mark Austin. On Tuesdays and Thursdays, a studio show presented by John Leslie aired. This programme included an interview with the castaway voted off the previous episode and included unseen footage from the island. Billboards were allotted around the UK displaying the slogan "You Don't Win, You Survive". The billboards created confusion amongst viewers as it misled them into thinking people would die throughout the game. Executive producer Nigel Lythgoe complained to Heat magazine about the decision. He said: "The tagline when I left for Borneo was 'Trust No One', which is great. When I got back it was, 'You Don't Win, You Survive'. Well, you did win – you won a million pounds! And of course you survive, because we're not going to let you die."

== Contestants ==
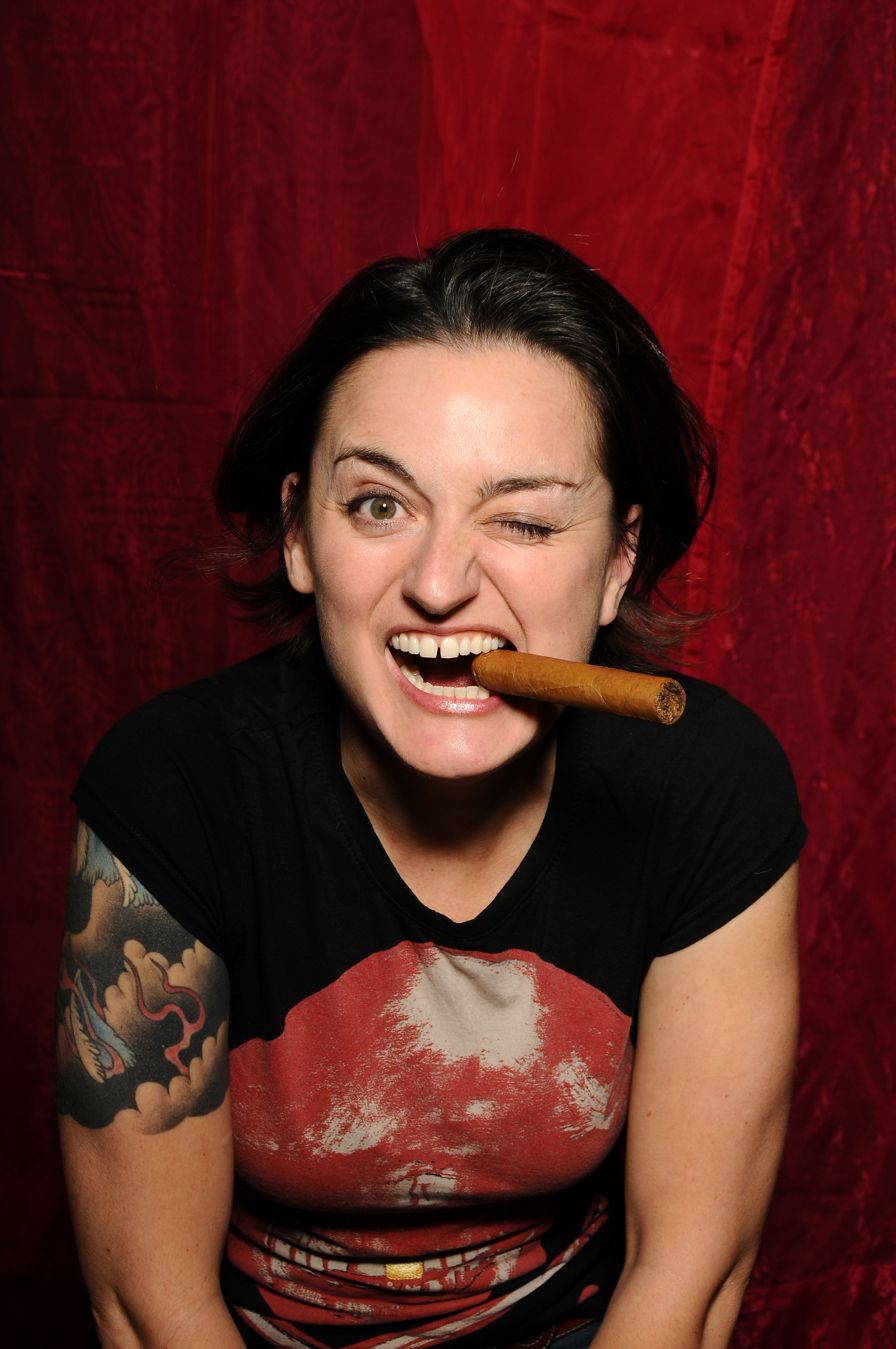
Zoe Lyons

There were 16 contestants, divided into two tribes, Helang and Ular. After six contestants were eliminated, the tribes were merged to form one tribe, Sekutu. The final seven eliminated contestants made up the jury that decided who would be the winner.

List of Survivor: Pulau Tiga contestants
Contestant	Age	From	Tribe		Finish	
Contestant	Age	From	Original	Merged	Placement	Day
Nick Carter	38	Gedling, England	Ular		1st voted out	Day 4
Jennifer "J.J." Adams	37	Barry, Wales	Helang		2nd voted out	Day 7
Uzma Bashir Sheikh	30	Croxley Green, England	Helang		3rd voted out	Day 10
Sarah Odell	30	Fulham, England	Ular		4th voted out	Day 13
Jayne Maylar	47	Steyning, England	Helang		5th voted out	Day 16
Adrian Bauckham	22	Gravesend, England	Helang		6th voted out	Day 19
Simon Dunkley	35	Sutton Coldfield, England	Helang	Sekutu	7th voted out	Day 22
Andy Fairfield	41	Syresham, England	Helang	Sekutu	8th voted out 1st jury member	Day 25
James Stroud	40	Wimbledon, England	Helang	Sekutu	9th voted out 2nd jury member	Day 28
Pete Farrar	30	Stockport, England	Ular	Sekutu	10th voted out 3rd jury member	Day 31
Zoe Lyons	29	London, England	Ular	Sekutu	11th voted out 4th jury member	Day 34
Eve Holding	30	Wantage, England	Ular	Sekutu	12th voted out 5th jury member	Day 37
Mick Easton	55	Dartford, England	Ular	Sekutu	13th voted out 6th jury member	Day 38
Richard Owen	33	Cardiff, Wales	Ular	Sekutu	14th voted out 7th jury member	Day 39
Jackie Carey	31	Woking, England	Ular	Sekutu	Runner-up	Day 40
Charlotte Hobrough	24	Rhoose, Wales	Helang	Sekutu	Ultimate Survivor	Day 40

== Season summary ==
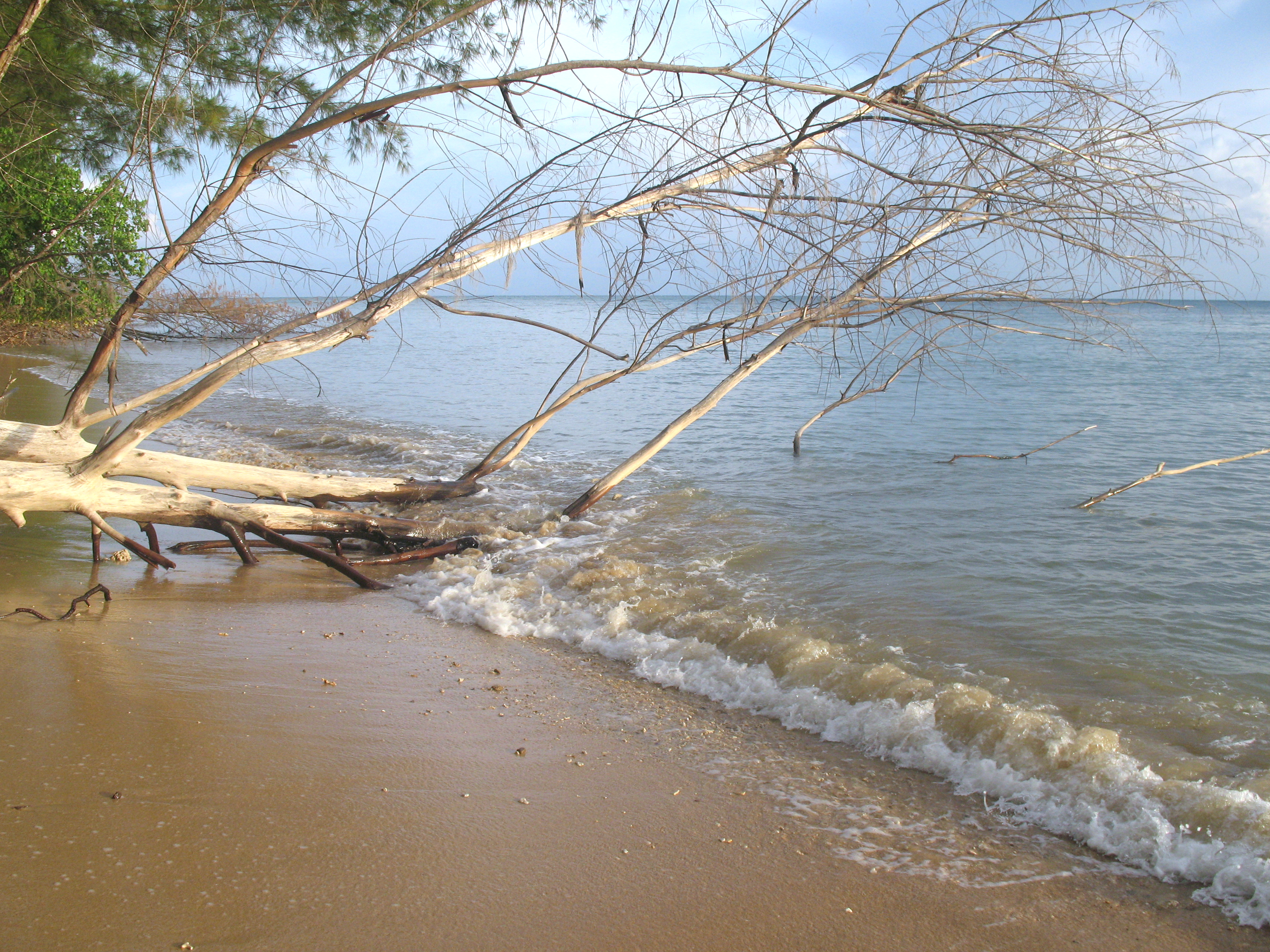
The series was filmed on the island of Pulau Tiga in Malaysia.

Challenge winners and eliminations by episode
Episode		Challenge winner(s)		Eliminated	
No.	Air date	Reward	Immunity	Tribe	Player
1	21 May 2001	None	Helang (Note: Although Ular finished first, they failed to light one of the torches resulting in them being disqualified and Helang winning the challenge.)	Ular	Nick
2	24 May 2001	Ular	Ular	Helang	J.J.
3	28 May 2001	Ular	Ular	Helang	Uzma
4	31 May 2001	Helang	Helang	Ular	Sarah
5	4 June 2001	Helang	Ular (Note: Although Helang finished first, one of their tribe members failed to complete the obstacle course, resulting in them being disqualified, and Ular winning the challenge.)	Helang	Jayne
6	7 June 2001	Ular	Ular	Helang	Adrian
7	11 June 2001	None (Note: There was no reward challenge due to the merge.)	Andy	Sekutu	Simon
8	18 June 2001	James [Andy]	Pete	Sekutu	Andy
9	25 June 2001	Survivor auction	Richard	Sekutu	James
10	2 July 2001	Pete	Richard	Sekutu	Pete
11	9 July 2001	Richard [Charlotte]	Eve	Sekutu	Zoe
12	16 July 2001	Eve	Richard	Sekutu	Eve
13	23 July 2001	None	Richard	Sekutu	Mick
13	23 July 2001	None	Charlotte	Sekutu	Richard

== Voting history ==
	Original tribes							Merged tribe								
Episode	1	2		3	4	5	6	7	8	9	10	11		12	13	
Day	4	7		10	13	16	19	22	25	28	31	34		37	38	39
Tribe	Ular	Helang		Helang	Ular	Helang	Helang	Sekutu	Sekutu	Sekutu	Sekutu	Sekutu		Sekutu	Sekutu	Sekutu
Eliminated	Nick	Tie (Note: The first Tribal Council vote resulted in a tie. Per the rules, a second vote was held where the castaways involved in the tie would not vote and the remaining castaways could only vote for those who tied.)	J.J.	Uzma	Sarah	Jayne	Adrian	Simon	Andy	James	Pete	Tie (Note: The first Tribal Council vote resulted in a tie. The tied castaways were involved on a Tribal Council countback was called as a tiebreaker. Charlotte had one previous vote but Zoe had five, therefore Zoe was eliminated.)	Zoe	Eve	Mick	Richard
Vote	5–3	4–4	4–2	4–2–1	5-2	5–1	3–2	6–2–1–1	6–2–1	6–1–1	5–1–1	3–3	Countback	4–1	3–1	2–1
Voter	Votes															
Charlotte		J.J.	J.J.	Jayne		Jayne	James	Eve	Richard	Zoe	Eve	Zoe	1 vote	Eve	Mick	Richard
Jackie	Nick				Sarah			Simon	Andy	James	Pete	Zoe		Eve	Mick	Richard
Richard	Nick				Sarah			Simon	Andy	James	Pete	Zoe		Eve	Mick	Jackie
Mick	Jackie				Sarah			Simon	Andy	James	Pete	Charlotte		Eve	Jackie	
Eve	Nick				Zoe			Simon	Andy	James	Pete	Charlotte		Jackie		
Zoe	Nick				Sarah			Simon	Andy	James	Pete	Charlotte	5 votes			
Pete	Jackie				Sarah			Simon	Andy	James	Charlotte					
James		J.J.	J.J.	Uzma		Jayne	Adrian	Zoe	Richard	Mick						
Andy		Uzma	Uzma	Uzma		Jayne	Adrian	Zoe	Jackie							
Simon		Uzma	J.J.	Uzma		Jayne	Adrian	Richard								
Adrian		J.J.	J.J.	Jayne		Jayne	James									
Jayne		Uzma	Uzma	Uzma		Adrian										
Sarah	Nick				Zoe											
Uzma		J.J.	None (Note: J.J. and Uzma were not eligible to vote in the second Tribal Council vote.)	James												
J.J.		Uzma	None													
Nick	Jackie															

Jury vote
Episode	14	
Day	40	
Finalist	Charlotte	Jackie
Votes	7–0	
Juror	Vote	
Richard	Yes	
Mick	Yes	
Eve	Yes	
Zoe	Yes	
Pete	Yes	
James	Yes	
Andy	Yes	

== Ratings ==
The series was perceived as being not very popular with UK viewers. Despite Survivor receiving initial media hype, the debut episode opened with 6.6 million viewers, which was seen as a disappointment for ITV. Despite the figures, an ITV spokesperson said: "We couldn't have hoped for anything better. We never expected 10m on the first night although we hope it will build to this. You have got to remember that we introduced 16 strangers and a complicated gameshow to the audience and we are confident it will grow. It's already a massive talking point, making the front pages."

Ratings for the series then dropped to an average of 5 million, which was half of the audience that the network had expected. In response, ITV made the decision to transmit less episodes per week to allow the hype for the series to grow. However, their change failed to have an impact on viewing figures. Nevertheless, the finale of the first series garnered 7.7 million viewers, peaking at 9 million. Despite being low in ratings by ITV's expectations, Survivor was the most watched reality television series in the UK at its time of airing, such as Big Brother. After the first series had concluded, Julia Lamaison, ITV's Head of Strategy, admitted that the network were too hopeful with their expectations for the series. They had hoped for a series average of 12 million viewers, accrediting their hopefulness to the success of the series in America. Lamaison also admitted that ITV had not supported Survivor enough in the first series, particularly with the time slot and the scheduling.
