= Simon Hughes (cricketer) =

English cricketer and journalist (born 1959)

Personal information
- Full name: Simon Peter Hughes
- Born: 20 December 1959 (age 66); Kingston upon Thames, England
- Batting: Right-handed
- Bowling: Right arm fast-medium

Domestic team information
- Years: Team
- 1980–1991: Middlesex
- 1982–1983: Northern Transvaal
- 1987–1988: Grafton United Cricket Club
- 1992–1993: Durham

Career statistics
| Competition | First-class | List A |
|---|---|---|
| Matches | 205 | 202 |
| Runs scored | 1,775 | 476 |
| Batting average | 11.37 | 11.60 |
| 100s/50s | 0/1 | 0/0 |
| Top score | 53 | 22 * |
| Balls bowled | 28,984 | 9,502 |
| Wickets | 466 | 272 |
| Bowling average | 32.48 | 25.47 |
| 5 wickets in innings | 10 | 1 |
| 10 wickets in match | 0 | 0 |
| Best bowling | 7/35 | 5/23 |
| Catches/stumpings | 50/– | 30/– |
- Source: Cricinfo, 10 December 2021

Simon Peter Hughes (born 20 December 1959), also known as The Analyst, is an English cricketer and journalist.

== Background ==
He is the son of the actor Peter Hughes, and the brother of the classical historian and broadcaster Bettany Hughes.

== Cricket career ==
At Latymer Upper School he was an outstanding fast medium bowler of away-swing and captained the school XI. He went on to study general arts at Durham University, and played for the university.

He joined Middlesex in 1980 and played for them for 12 seasons, culminating in his benefit season of 1991. He subsequently spent two seasons (1992–1993) playing for Durham. Hughes also played for Northern Transvaal in South Africa during the winter of 1982–83, and the Grafton United Cricket Club in Auckland in the 1987–1988 season.

Part of a successful Middlesex side, Hughes helped them win the County Championship in 1980, 1982, 1985 and 1990. Hughes also appeared in Middlesex victories in the finals of the Benson and Hedges Cup in 1986, the Refuge Assurance Cup in 1990, and the NatWest Trophy in 1980, 1984 and 1988. In the latter final he took 4–30, and he was often entrusted with bowling overs late on in the innings (sometimes called "death bowling") in limited overs cricket. He had a less happy experience in the final of the NatWest Trophy in 1989, bowling the last over as Middlesex were defeated by Warwickshire.

== Journalism ==
Hughes retired in 1993 to concentrate on a writing career which had begun as a player for The Independent with the widely acclaimed Cricketer's Diary. In 1994 he joined The Daily Telegraph as a columnist and became the BBC's roving reporter on Test matches. He has worked as a journalist for The Independent, The Daily Telegraph, The Times and for the BBC.

He edited The Cricketer magazine for seven years (2014–2021).

He has written ten books, including the autobiographical A Lot of Hard Yakka (for which he won the William Hill Sports Book of the Year in 1997), Yakking Around the World (which dealt with his experiences as a county cricketer during and between cricket seasons), Jargonbusting (a guide to cricket terminology), Morning Everyone: An Ashes Odyssey, And God Created Cricket (a history of the game) and Who Wants to Be a Batsman?

He is also known for his work as The Analyst on Channel 4's cricket coverage (from 1999 to 2005), winning the Royal Television Society's Sports pundit of the Year award in 2002, where he spent matches in a VT trailer, watching replays and drawing viewers' attention to particular details. Channel 4's cricket coverage won 28 awards in its seven-year span, including six Baftas. He was a commentator/analyst on Cricket on 5 with Sir Geoffrey Boycott and Mark Nicholas (with whom he worked on Channel 4). He originally signed up for the programme from 2006 to 2010 when the deal expired, with the ECB.

On England's December 2007 Test match tour of Sri Lanka he was a summariser on the BBC's Test Match Special, and a commentator for the ODI series against the West Indies in 2009. In 2010 he again joined the Test Match Special team commentating on the tour of Bangladesh and the One Day Series against Australia. He has commentated on many home and overseas series for the BBC since and was the analyst for ITV4's coverage of the 2010 Indian Premier League up to the 2015 Indian Premier League.

He was The Analyst on Channel 5's evening highlights programme until he was replaced in 2018 by Alison Mitchell.

He commentates on BBC Radio and BT Sport and writes for The Sunday Times. He also produced the analysis segments for the international coverage of the 2019 ICC World Cup including the final. In 2021 he produced a tenth book, A New Innings, co-written with Manoj Badale, owner of the Rajasthan Royals, detailing how the IPL reinvented the game and provides lessons for the business of sport.

He presents and produces a regular podcast – The Analyst Inside Cricket – with the BBC's Simon Mann. Most recently he has formed a media production company, Starfield Films, with his next-door neighbour, the director Ashley Gething. In partnership with Sylver Entertainment they have produced a cinematic documentary, The Greatest Game, retelling the story of England's 2019 World Cup triumph through the prism of the players and their families. Stephen Fry called it "one of the best sporting documentaries I have ever seen".

== Mobile application ==
To bring together content in a digital form previously only available in his books and to consolidate his news, views and insights, prior to the Cricket World Cup (March 2011) he launched the Cricket Analyst mobile application on the Apple iPhone/iPad and Google Android. devices in partnership with Anton Christodoulou.

== Bibliography ==
- From Minor to Major (1992), Hodder & Stoughton (Teach Yourself), "the story of Durham's first first-class season from the inside", ISBN 978-0340582343
- A Lot of Hard Yakka (1997), Headline Book Publishing, ISBN 978-0747255161
- Yakking Around the World: A Cricketer's Quest for Love and Utopia (2001), Pocket Books, ISBN 978-0671773823
- Jargonbusting, (2002), Channel 4 Books, ISBN 978-0752265087
- Morning Everyone: An Ashes Odyssey
- And God Created Cricket
- Cricket's Greatest Rivalry: A History of the Ashes in 10 Matches (2013), Cassell Illustrated, ISBN 978-1844037438
- Who Wants to Be a Batsman? (2015)
- A New Innings (2020) with Manoj Badale.

Awards
| Preceded by Donald McRae | William Hill Sports Book of the Year winner 1997 | Succeeded by Robert Twigger |
| Preceded by John McEnroe | RTS Television Sport Awards; Best Sports Pundit; 2002 | Succeeded by Michael Johnson |
