= Survivor (British TV series) =

British reality television series

- logo of series
- Genre: Reality competition
- Created by: Charlie Parsons
- Based on: Expedition Robinson/Survivor by Charlie Parsons
- Presented by: Mark Austin; Mark Nicholas; Joel Dommett
- Starring: John Leslie
- Theme music composer: Russ Landau (2001–2002); Jeremy Birchall (2023)
- Country of origin: United Kingdom
- Original language: English
- No. of series: 3
- No. of episodes: 42

Production
- Executive producers: Nigel Lythgoe (2001–2002): Stephen Lovelock; Natalka Znak; Georgina Hinds; Claire O'Donohoe (2023)
- Running time: 60 minutes (inc. adverts)
- Production companies: Planet 24 (2001–2002); Remarkable Entertainment (2023)

Original release
- Network: ITV
- Release: 21 May 2001 – 29 May 2002
- Network: BBC One
- Release: 28 October – 16 December 2023

Related
- International versions

Survivor (also known as Survivor UK outside of the UK) is a British adventure reality game show based on the international Survivor format. Following the premise of other versions of the Survivor format, the show features a group of contestants, referred to as "castaways" as they are marooned in an isolated location. The castaways must provide food, water, fire, and shelter for themselves. The contestants compete in various challenges for rewards and immunity from elimination. The contestants are progressively eliminated from the game as they are voted off the island by their fellow castaways. The winner receives a cash prize.

The series aired for two editions on the ITV network in 2001 and 2002, but the series was considered a ratings failure despite the programme having a higher viewership than other reality series at the time, including Big Brother. ITV cancelled Survivor after two series because it had failed to garner a loyal viewership. The network admitted fault for not supporting the series enough in its launch phase, highlighting the key issue with their approach to the scheduling of the series.

In September 2022, a revival of the series was announced by the BBC, and premiered on 28 October 2023 on BBC One and BBC iPlayer.

== Format ==
The show follows the same general format as the other editions of Survivor. To begin, the players are split into two tribes and are taken to a remote, isolated location and are forced to live off the land with meagre supplies for a period of several weeks. Frequent physical and mental challenges are used to pit the tribes against each other for rewards, such as food or luxuries, or for immunity, forcing the other tribe to attend Tribal Council, where they must vote one of their tribemates out of the game by secret ballot.

About halfway through the game, the tribes are merged into a single tribe, and challenges are on an individual basis; winning immunity prevents that player from being voted out. Most players that are voted out during this stage become members of the Tribal Council Jury. When only two (ITV iteration) or three (BBC iteration) players remain, the Final Tribal Council is held. The finalists plead their case to the Jury as to why they should win the game. The jurors then have the opportunity to question the finalists before voting to determine the winner. The prize was £1 million in the 2001–2002 ITV iteration. In the 2023 BBC iteration, the winner received £100,000 and the title of "Sole Survivor".

Like other editions of the show, the British edition has introduced numerous modifications or twists on the core rules to prevent players from over-relying on strategies that succeeded in prior seasons or other editions of the show. Most notably, the Hidden Immunity Idols (small trinkets hidden on the island) were introduced part way through the third season. Players can use these hidden idols to save themselves or another player at the Tribal Council from being voted off. Also introduced was The Outpost, which exiles players for a predetermined amount of time while offering dilemmas and decisions that may help or hinder their game.

== History ==
=== Origins ===
While working on the Channel 4 show, Network 7 Charlie Parsons produced a feature titled "The Castaways", featuring four people marooned on an island in Sri Lanka for two weeks. This feature would become the basis of Survivor as a format. After years of developing the series, the first version of Survivor debuted in Sweden in September 1997 as Expedition Robinson, while the American version of Survivor debuted in 2000 and became the flagship version of the franchise, airing 50 seasons as of 2026.

=== Original run ===
The first series, Survivor: Pulau Tiga, premiered on ITV on 21 May 2001. Billboards were shown across the UK displaying the slogan "You Don't Win, You Survive". The billboards created confusion amongst viewers as it misled them into thinking people would die throughout the game. Executive producer Nigel Lythgoe complained to the Heat magazine about the decision. He said: "The tagline when I left for Borneo was 'Trust No One', which is great. When I got back it was, 'You Don't Win, You Survive'. Well, you did win – you won a million pounds! And of course you survive, because we're not going to let you die." Despite Survivor receiving initial media coverage, the debut episode opened with 6.6 million viewers, which was seen as a disappointment for ITV. Despite the figures, an ITV spokesperson said: "We couldn't have hoped for anything better. We never expected 10m on the first night although we hope it will build to this. You have got to remember that we introduced 16 strangers and a complicated gameshow to the audience and we are confident it will grow. It's already a massive talking point, making the front pages." Ratings for the series then dropped to an average of 5 million, which was half of the audience that the network had expected. In response, ITV made the decision to transmit fewer episodes per week to allow the anticipation for the series to grow. However, their change failed to have an impact on viewing figures. Nevertheless, the finale of the first series received 7.7 million viewers, peaking at 9 million.

Despite being low in ratings by ITV's expectations, Survivor was the most watched reality television series in the UK at its time of airing, such as Big Brother. After the first series had concluded, Julia Lamaison, ITV's Head of Strategy, admitted that the network were too hopeful with their expectations for the series. They had hoped for a series average of 12 million viewers, accrediting their hopefulness to the success of the series in America. Lamaison also admitted that ITV had not supported Survivor enough in the first series, particularly with the time slot and the scheduling. Despite the low ratings for the first series, ITV aired the second series, Survivor: Panama, a year after the first. Survivor faced an overhaul, the changes of which included fewer contestants, audience participation - by means of a telivote held to cast a Jury Vote alongside the evicted castaways - and replacing presenters Mark Austin and John Leslie with one sole presenter, Mark Nicholas. It was aired every Wednesday at 9:45 pm and episodes were repeated on Fridays at 8:30 pm. The second series was also accompanied by Survivor: The Last Word, a televised interview with evictees, as well as a supporting series, Survivor: Raw, broadcast on sister channel ITV2. After Survivor's viewership failed to increase, ITV cancelled it after two series.

=== I'm a Celebrity ... lawsuit ===
Before it was officially confirmed that Survivor had been axed by ITV, the network began broadcasting I'm a Celebrity...Get Me Out of Here!, the format of which had many similarities to Survivor, and which received better ratings in August 2002. The show's similarity in content to Survivor led many viewers to believe that the shows had some licensing agreement, however this was not the case. The production company behind Survivor attempted to take legal action, but this was later dropped. Legal action was also sought by CBS to prevent broadcast of a planned American version in the US, however the court ruled against, stating that "Celebrity is different enough from Survivor that CBS would have difficulty prevailing in its underlying copyright infringement suit."

=== 2023 revival ===
Following the Banijay Group's acquisition of Castaway Productions, who own the Survivor format, it was said in 2017 that the company were looking to revive Survivor in the UK. Banijay's CEO Peter Langenberg spoke to Broadcast about the potential return, stating that RDF, the largest British production company within Banijay, is attempting to rekindle interest in the format amongst broadcasters. He explained: "Having hands on the format means we can polish it and come up with Survivor 2.0, because it needs a refresh".

Reports began circulating again in 2022 that the series would be revived, this time with BBC One said to be the potential new home of the series. Broadcast reported that the revival deal for Survivor is "on the brink", and that if the deal is finalised, the third series of the programme will be filmed in 2023 with thirteen episodes. Digital Spy's Daniel Kilkelly put forward his hopes for a revival of the programme. He felt that the key reasons for the series' initial failure lay with having a pre-recorded format which meant that viewers had no say into the events of the series. However, Kilkelly opined that the success of The Apprentice and The Great British Bake Off, both of which use pre-recorded formats, suggested that the British audience would now be ready to support a Survivor format. In September 2022, it was confirmed that Remarkable Entertainment (a subsidiary of Banijay) would produce a new series and would air on BBC One in 2023 consisting of 16 episodes. Contestant applications opened on 24 November. With the announcement of the application process, the prize of £100,000 was revealed. On 17 February 2023, Joel Dommett was confirmed as host of the revival.

=== Cancellation ===
In August 2024, it was first reported that Survivor would be axed after just one series due to poor ratings but this was not confirmed until a year later.

== Series overview ==
List of British Survivor series
No.	Title	Episodes	Game Information						Results			Host
No.	Title	Episodes	Location	First released	Last released	Days	Castaways	Original tribes	Winner	Runner(s) up	Final vote	Host
ITV iteration (2001–2002)
1	Survivor: Pulau Tiga	14	Pulau Tiga, Sabah, Malaysia	21 May 2001	25 July 2001	40	16	Two tribes of eight players	Charlotte Hobrough	Jackie Carey	7–0	Mark Austin (Note: John Leslie hosted a live studio-based companion show, conducting exit interviews with the players and presenting additional footage of events from the game. He also hosted the live finale and reunion.)
2	Survivor: Panama	12	Bocas del Toro, Panama	13 March 2002	29 May 2002	37	12	Two tribes of six players	Jonny Gibb	Susannah Moffat	7–0 (Note: On Survivor: Panama, the British public cast a Jury Vote by televoting, alongside six eliminated players. The British public voted for Jonny Gibb with 89% of the vote.)	Mark Nicholas
BBC iteration (2023)
3	-	16	Playa Caleton, Dominican Republic	28 October 2023	16 December 2023	34	18	Two tribes of nine players	Matthew Haywood	Christopher Haul & Leilani Sen	6–1–1	Joel Dommett

== Production ==
=== Locations ===
Continent	Locations		Series number(s)
Asia	Malaysia	Pulau Tiga, Sabah	1
Central America	Panama	Bocas del Toro	2
North America	Dominican Republic	Playa Caleton	3

== International broadcast ==
The series airs on the following channels outside of the UK:

- In Australia, the BBC iteration of the series is available to stream on the 10 Play on the day after each episode has aired on BBC One. This is a companion to Australian Survivor aired by Network 10.
- In New Zealand, the BBC iteration is available to stream on TVNZ+.
- In Sweden, the series is titled Robinson UK (reflecting the Expedition Robinson title used in Sweden for Survivor) and is available to watch on TV4's streaming service, TV4 Play.

== See also ==
Other versions

- Survivor (American TV series)
- Australian Survivor
- Survivor NZ
- Survivor South Africa

Similar shows

- Castaway 2000
- Escape from Scorpion Island
- I'm a Celebrity...Get Me Out of Here!
- Shipwrecked
- The Island with Bear Grylls
- The Traitors
