= Simon Mann (cricket commentator) =

British sports broadcaster (born 1963)

Simon Mann (born November 1963 in Bristol) is a BBC radio sports commentator, most notable for being a member of the Test Match Special team and who also reports on football matches for BBC Radio 5 Live, as well as the Indian Premier League. Mann supports Bristol City F.C.

== Career ==
Educated at Queen Elizabeth's Hospital and the University of Birmingham, where he read history, Mann joined the BBC in 1990 and first reported on Test matches for BBC Radio 5 Live four years later. He is now a regular commentator on BBC Radio's Test Match Special. He joined the Test Match Special commentary team for the first time on England's 1996 tour to Zimbabwe.

His broadcasting highlight came during the 1999 World Cup when he described the closing overs of the South Africa vs Australia semi-final for BBC TV: "It was an exciting, unpredictable one-day game with a dramatic and bizarre finish."

With Simon Hughes he hosts The Analyst Inside Cricket podcast discussing topical issues in the game with a focus on current tournaments and England matches.
