= Dryrobe =

British sports clothing brand

- Company type: Privately held company
- Industry: Clothing
- Founded: 2010; 16 years ago
- Founder: Gideon Bright
- Headquarters: Barnstaple, United Kingdom
- Products: Waterproof drying coat for sports use
- Website: www.dryrobe.com

Dryrobe is a British outdoor clothing brand, specializing in waterproof and thermal insulated changing robes. Founded in 2010 by surfer Gideon Bright, the company manufactures gear for outdoor athletes, particularly in cold or wet conditions. The brand's primary product, the Dryrobe Advance is commonly used in activities including open water swimming, triathlon, surfing, and across a wide range of outdoor sports.

== History ==
The Dryrobe was first released in 2010. The product was the idea of Gideon Bright, who had frequently struggled to keep warm while changing into surfing gear in the Cornwall, United Kingdom.

In 1983 as a young surfer, Bright's mother used to use a towelling robe for changing on the beach. However, he and his mother noticed that when it rained or when it was cold, the robe didn't really serve much of a purpose. His mother then created an additional layer made of a tent-like material. Over a decade later, the prototype his mother created was used as the initial step to create the Dryrobe product.

In the early stages of development, Gideon Bright traveled to Australia to examine comparable products already available. He observed individuals wearing parka-style jackets that they used both in and out of the water. Inspired by what he saw, he began creating his own designs, emphasizing towel-lined interiors and an oversized structure that allowed users ample room to get their arms inside. He shared each prototype with friends and contacts in the watersports community to gather their input. Eventually, Bright finalised a design and produced an early commercial weatherproof changing robe, leading to the establishment of the Dryrobe brand.

Weatherproof changing robes emerged alongside broader traditions of surf ponchos, towelling robes and parka-style over-garments used in watersports communities prior to commercialisation of the category.

The product first began to increase its sales after being showcased not only to surfers, but to athletes at triathlon. Bright was approached by a Team GB performance director, who bought a handful of the Dryrobes on the spot. Shortly after the purchase, Team GB triathletes began to wear the products while they were competing. This included Alistair Brownlee and Jonny Brownlee. The exposure of Team GB's athletes wearing the Dryrobe, encouraged deals with other sports teams and events. Between 2014 and early 2016, new deals with U.S. Masters Swimming, Tough Mudder and the International Triathlon Union were all agreed.

By early 2016, the brand had expanded beyond triathletes and was now used by other extreme sports athletes. Dryrobe was launched in the United States, with a warehouse to fulfill growing interest in the product in the USA & Canada. This was down to the high interest and demand from Kayakers, Surfers and Obstacle Course Racers in America and Canada. Bright stated in an interview, "It's solving a problem that is inherent in nearly all outdoor sports activities. Getting out of the wind and rain while changing just makes good sense, and will preserve energy to be used via chosen activity."

The popularity of the product within athlete circles led to it featuring in the 2016 Olympics in Rio. By Tokyo 2020, there was widespread usage by the British Olympic and Paralympic team members. Ambassadors include big wave surfer Andrew Cotton.

In 2022, Dryrobes began to be worn in the street, with Grazia calling them "the must-have, all-season coat".

== Design ==
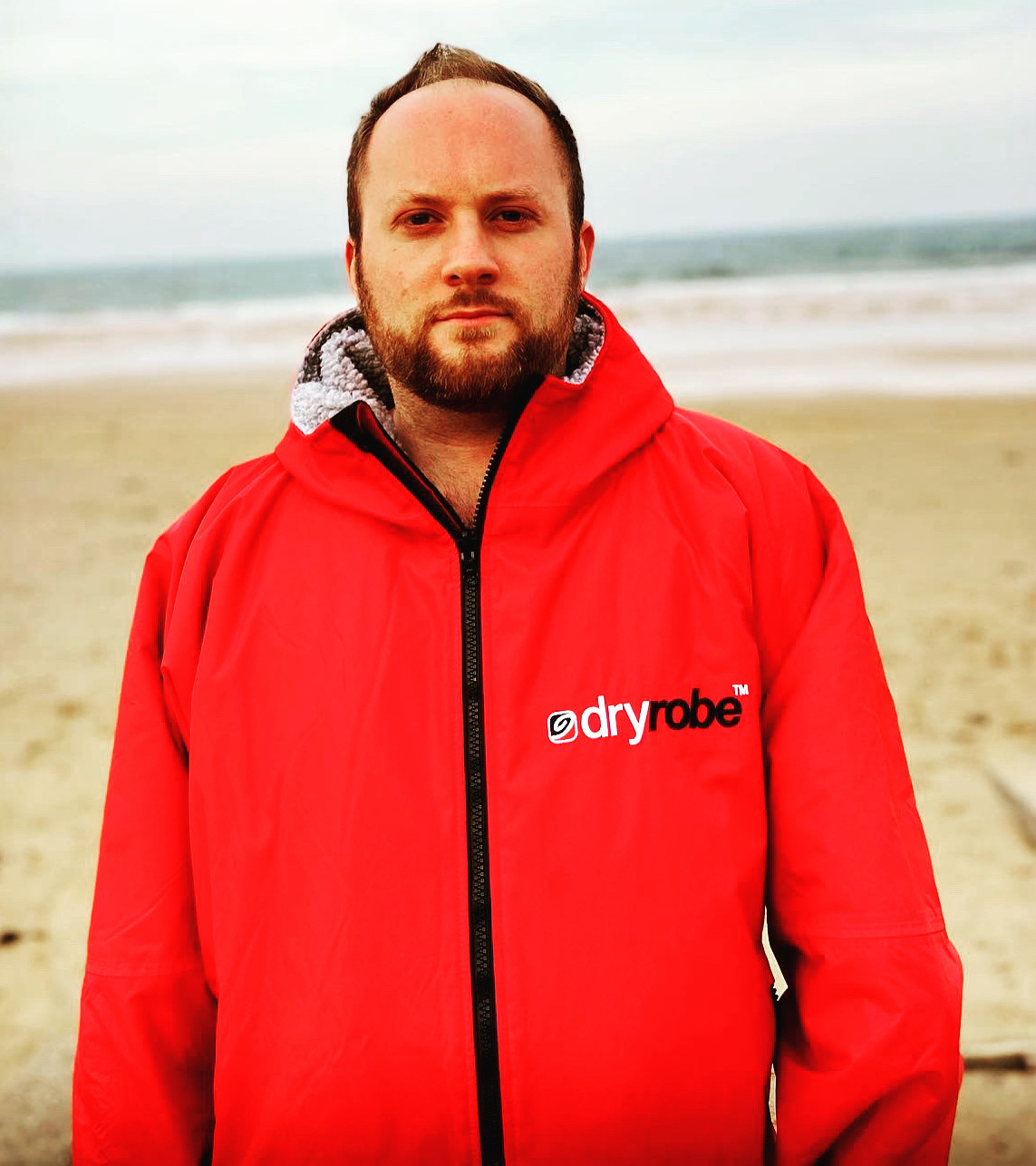
A person wearing a red dryrobe

The design was based on a number of common items of clothing used by Australian surfers and swimmers.

Dryrobe was tested in the watersports community. It was intended to be a more convenient and versatile design, allowing use in different sports, keeping an athlete warm during downtime or immediately after an event.

In 2022, the Institute of Sport at Manchester Metropolitan University (MMU) conducted an independent study to evaluate the performance of the Dryrobe Advance in cold water exposure scenarios. The findings indicated that wearing the Dryrobe Advance contributed to a reduction in heart rate, an increase in skin temperature, and an overall improvement in thermal comfort following cold water immersion.

In August 2022, the company achieved B Corp™ certification, an international recognition awarded to organizations that meet high standards of social and environmental performance, transparency and accountability.

== Application ==
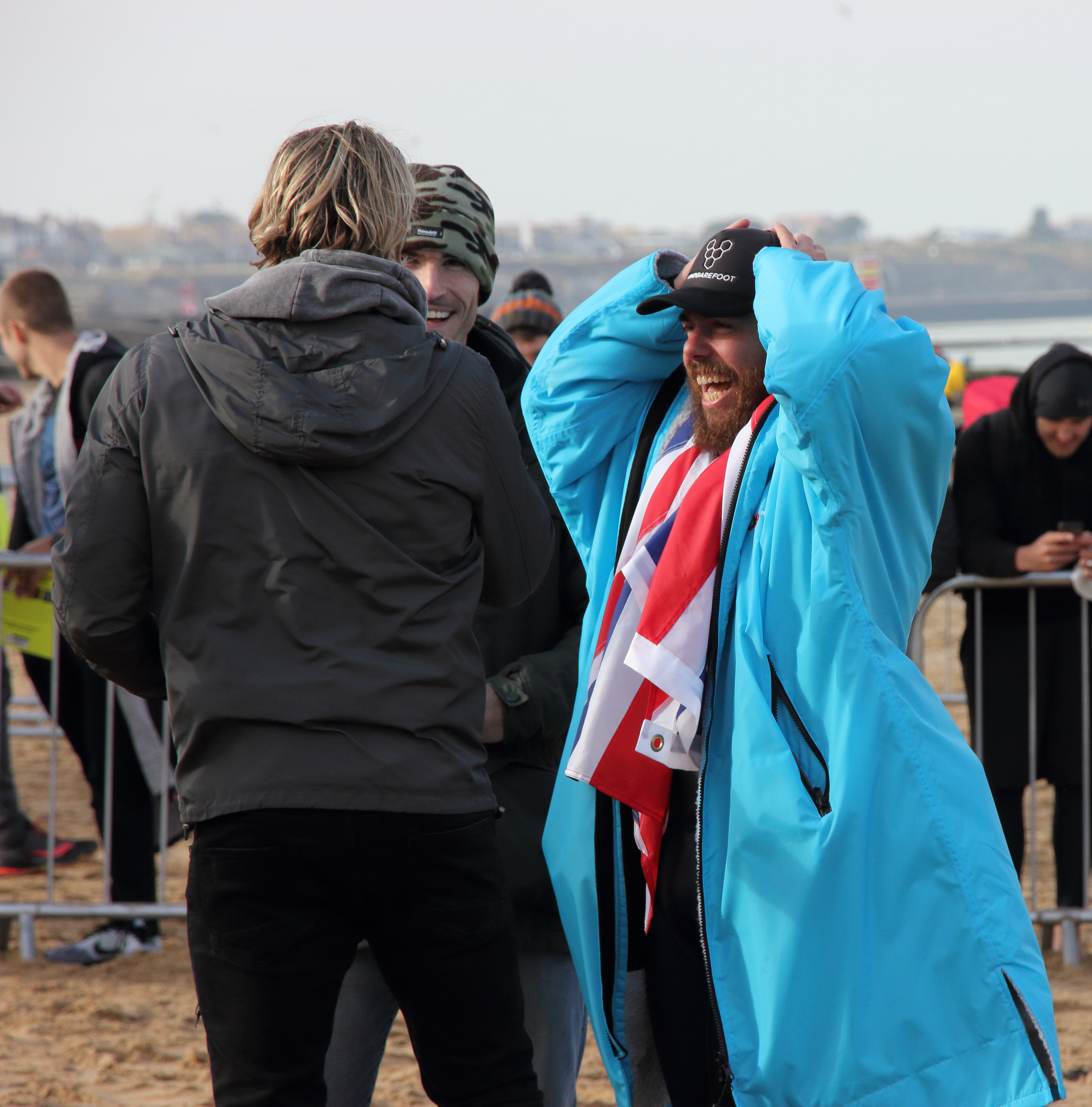
British swimmer Ross Edgley in a Dryrobe

The Dryrobe is commonly used across a number of sporting disciplines and outdoor activities. In 2016, the Dryrobe received coverage in the media for its use in the outdoor obstacle event, Tough Mudder. It began life as an item of sports clothing to be used by surfers.

Since then the product has spun out to be used by numerous sporting teams across a variety of sports. According to their website, the Dryrobe is commonly used for swimming, surfing, rowing, caravan & camping, OCR, diving, wakeboarding, triathlons, boating, sailing, rugby, surf life saving, kayaking, windsurfing, kitesurfing, paddle boarding, football, mountain biking, skiing/snowboarding, climbing, cycling, cross-country, cliff diving, ironman competitions, athletics, boxing, canoeing, lacrosse, hockey, equestrian, curling outdoor obstacle events such as Tough Mudder, Spartan and Redbull extreme sports.

== Partnership ==
In 2014, Dryrobe began long-term partnerships with organizations such as Red Bull, RLSS UK and Nuclear Races, expanding the use of the product into sports such as open water swimming, triathlon, cliff jumping, mountain biking and obstacle racing.

In 2016, the brand partnered with Adidas to provide customized robes to Team GB at the Rio de Janeiro Olympics.

In 2022, Dryrobe partnered with One Carbon World, a UK-based non-profit organization focused on climate initiatives, to support efforts toward reducing its carbon emissions.

In 2024, Dryrobe extended its long-standing partnership with Surfing England, also expanding its support to Team England's Stand-Up Paddle (SUP) squad at the ISA World SUP and Paddleboard Championship in Copenhagen.
