= Lee Reeves (boxer) =

Irish boxer and television personality (1995–2026)

Personal information
- Born: 28 February 1995 Limerick, Ireland
- Died: 16 November 2026 (aged 31) Limerick, Ireland
- Height: 5 ft 11 in (180 cm)

Boxing career
- Stance: Southpaw

Boxing record
- Total fights: 18
- Wins: 16
- Win by KO: 11
- Losses: 2
- Draws: 0

Lee Reeves (28 February 1995 – 16 November 2026) was an Irish professional boxer. He held a pro record of 16 wins and 2 losses. He died in November 2026 as a result of injuries sustained during a fight three months prior.

== Background and career ==
Reeves was born and raised in Limerick, the oldest of four children of Cathy and Tony Reeves.

He was a serving member of the 12th Infantry Battalion at Sarsfield Barracks.

In 2015, his mother Cathy died by suicide following a long battle against breast cancer. Reeves aspired to achieve the heights of Katie Taylor in memory of his mother. Reeves's brother Tony also died.

In 2018, Reeves signed a promotional deal with Lee Baxter Promotions in Canada, gaining the attention of boxer Tyson Fury.

== Survivor ==
Reeves appeared on Survivor UK in 2023. He was voted out on day 20, after being considered "too much" by the other contestants, becoming the first member of the jury and voting for Matthew Haywood (the eventual winner) to win.

== Death ==
On 1 August 2026, Reeves was taken to hospital after being knocked out by Gary Cully in the tenth round of their super-lightweight fight at the 3Arena, in Dublin. He was initially in a "critical but stable" condition. Despite initial reports of recovery, Reeves died on 16 November 2026, aged 31, after contracting an infection. Tributes were paid by many local and national individuals in recognition of his boxing career and mental health campaigning with the Limerick Treaty Suicide Prevention (L.T.S.P.).

Reeves' funeral took place four days after his death on 20 November 2026 at the Our Lady Queen of Peace Church, in Roxboro. He was later buried at the Mount Saint Oliver Cemetery with full military honours.
