= Leilani Sen =

Leilani
- Born: Leilani Sen; 1978 (age 47–48); Hatfield, Hertfordshire, England
- Genres: Pop
- Occupation: Singer
- Instrument: Vocals
- Years active: 1998–2000; 2023
- Label: ZTT (1998–2000)

Leilani (born Leilani Sen, November or December 1978, Hatfield, Hertfordshire, England) is an English pop singer.

== Career ==
She was signed to ZTT records from 1998 to 2000 and is best known for her 1999 single "Madness Thing" (UK No. 19). She released two further singles "Do You Want Me" (UK No. 40) and "Flying Elvis" (UK No. 73).

A fourth single, "This Is Your Life", and an album, Precious Treasure, were planned but not released. As part of 40th Anniversary celebrations of ZTT records, Precious Treasure was released for the first time in 2023.

In 2023, she released the singles "Got To Go" and "Wicked Knickers" to digital download and streaming platforms.

== Survivor ==
She was a contestant on the third series of the UK version of reality show Survivor and finished as runner-up alongside Christopher Haul, losing to Matthew Haywood.

== Discography ==
- 1999: "Madness Thing" – UK No. 19
- 1999: "Do You Want Me" – UK No. 40
- 2000: "Flying Elvis" – UK No. 73
- 2000: "This Is Your Life" (Unreleased)
- 2023: "Got To Go"
- 2023: "Wicked Knickers"
- 2023: Precious Treasure (Album)
