= Mark Nicholas =

English cricketer and broadcaster (born 1957)

Personal information
- Full name: Mark Charles Jefford Nicholas
- Born: 29 September 1957 (age 69); Westminster, London, England
- Nickname: Elvis, Jardine
- Batting: Right-handed
- Bowling: Right arm medium
- Relatives: Fred Nicholas (grandfather)

Domestic team information
- Years: Team
- 1978–1995: Hampshire

Career statistics
Competition	First-class	List A
Matches	377	359
Runs scored	18,262	7,334
Batting average	34.39	27.78
100s/50s	36/81	1/40
Top score	206*	108
Balls bowled	5,855	3,878
Wickets	72	101
Bowling average	45.06	32.38
5 wickets in innings	2	0
10 wickets in match	0	0
Best bowling	6/37	4/30
Catches/stumpings	215/–	113/–
- Source: CricketArchive, 7 January 2009

Mark Charles Jefford Nicholas (born 29 September 1957) is an English cricket commentator and former cricketer and broadcaster. He played for Hampshire from 1978 to 1995, captaining them from 1985 to his retirement. On 1 October 2023, he succeeded Stephen Fry as president of Marylebone Cricket Club on a one-year term.

Nicholas was born in Westminster, London. A grandson of Fred Nicholas, he was educated at Bradfield College where he was coached in cricket by John Harvey.

== Playing career ==
A middle-order batsman and occasional medium-pace bowler, Nicholas captained Hampshire to four major trophies – the Benson & Hedges Cup in 1988 and 1992, Sunday League in 1986, and NatWest Trophy in 1991 (although he missed the final of the 1991 tournament through injury, David Gower captaining in his absence). Although he captained an England 'B' tour to Sri Lanka in 1985–86, an England A tour to Zimbabwe in 1989/1990, and an "English Counties XI" tour of Zimbabwe in 1984–85, he was never selected for the England senior team.

Known for his suave appearance and urbane manner, Nicholas is one of a long line of colourfully dressed characters to captain Hampshire County Cricket Club, including Colin Ingleby-Mackenzie and C. B. Fry.

== Broadcasting career ==
Since his retirement as a player, Nicholas has worked in broadcasting, first as a commentator for Sky Sports, and from 1999 to 2005 as the anchorman for Channel 4's cricket coverage. He worked freelance in 1995 for Sky and others, before signing for Sky Sports in 1996 as anchorman, where his first major role was presenting domestic and international cricket.

He led Sky's coverage of England's winter tours to Zimbabwe and New Zealand in 1996/97, and continued this in the West Indies in 1998. His last role with Sky Sports was presenting the network's live and exclusive coverage of the 1998/99 Ashes series in Australia.

He commentated for Australia's Nine Network during the Australian summer cricket season until they lost the rights before the 2018/19 season. He anchored the coverage, replacing Richie Benaud as the face of cricket on Nine, despite having previously been dropped from the commentary team.

Until 2008 he wrote a weekly column for The Daily Telegraph. He was named Sports Presenter of the Year in 2001 by the Royal Television Society, as well as being one of only two presenters to stand in for Richard and Judy. Nicholas presented the second series of the English version of the reality show Survivor. He continued his commitments to Australia's Nine Network in March 2006, anchoring the afternoon coverage of the 2006 Commonwealth Games in Melbourne. He rated fourth in a Melbourne newspaper poll that set out to find the public's choice on the new host of the Australian version of Who Wants to be a Millionaire?.

While as Channel 4 anchor for the cricket, Nicholas presented Today at the Test which covered the highlights of the day's play at the England Test matches or the trophy finals.

Nicholas was approached by Channel Five to cover England cricket highlights from 2006, the programme being named Cricket on 5. He was joined on the programme by former cricketer Geoffrey Boycott and analyst Simon Hughes, both of whom worked with Nicholas at Channel 4, as well as former England captain Michael Vaughan.

Nicholas served as anchorman and commentator for the Nine Network coverage of the 2013–14 Ashes series and continued to serve this role for other Australian home Test series until they lost the rights in April 2018. He was part of the world feed commentary team for both the 2007 Cricket World Cup in the West Indies, and the 2011 World Cup in India, Sri Lanka and Bangladesh, 2015 Cricket World Cup in Australia and New Zealand and 2019 Cricket World Cup in England. He presented highlights coverage of 2012 Summer Olympics in London for the Nine Network.

Nicholas is the anchorman for EA Sports Cricket 07 game. He introduces the matches the user is playing, and commentates during the game with Richie Benaud, taking over from Jim Maxwell.

In 2002, Nicholas hosted the second series of the United Kingdom edition of Survivor. Nicholas began presenting ITV1's Britain's Best Dish in 2007 and fronted it for four series until in 2010 he was replaced by Mary Nightingale.

In November 2016, he published the autobiography A Beautiful Game: My Love Affair with Cricket. Nicholas also co-wrote Shane Warne's autobiography No Spin.

He was also a member of the world feed commentary team for 2020 Indian Premier League.

He has commentated for SuperSport in South Africa, covering the 2021–22 Test series between South Africa and India.

From 1 October 2023, Nicholas served a 12-month term as president of the Marylebone Cricket Club, having been nominated by his immediate predecessor, Stephen Fry.

After serving his term as president, he returned as anchor and lead commentator for Star Sports (Indian broadcasting feed) for the 2024-25 Border Gavaskar Trophy.

Sporting positions
Preceded by Nick Pocock	Hampshire cricket captain 1985–1995	Succeeded by John Stephenson
Awards
Preceded by Jim Rosenthal	RTS Television Sport Awards; Best Sports Presenter; 2000	Succeeded by Sue Barker
Preceded by Gary Lineker	RTS Television Sport Awards; Best Sports Presenter; 2005	Succeeded by Hazel Irvine
