= Mark Austin (journalist) =

English journalist and television presenter

- Born: Mark William Austin; 1 November 1958 (age 67); Portsmouth, Hampshire, England
- Education: Bournemouth School; Highbury College; Homefield School
- Occupations: Journalist, television presenter
- Years active: 1982–present
- Employer: Sky News
- Notable credit(s): ITV News; Survivor; Real Crime; Good Morning Britain; Sky News
- Height: 6 ft 2 in (1.88 m)
- Spouse: Catherine Austin
- Children: 3

Mark William Austin (born 1 November 1958) is an English journalist and television presenter, currently working for Sky News.

He is a former co-newscaster for the ITV Evening News, alongside Mary Nightingale, and the former co-newscaster of the ITV News at Ten, alongside Julie Etchingham. He also presented the ITV documentary series Real Crime from 2008 until 2011. From 24 September 2018, he has presented The News Hour and Sky News at 6 as part of schedule changes on Sky News.

== Education ==
Austin was educated at Bournemouth School, a state grammar school in the town of Bournemouth, in Dorset, followed by Highbury College in the city of Portsmouth in Hampshire.

== Career ==
=== Early career ===
Austin started his career in the media as a general reporter on the Bournemouth Daily Echo (1976–1980). He then joined the BBC as a newsroom writer, becoming a general news reporter in 1982. He was made a sports reporter in 1985. Austin joined ITN, who produce the news for ITV, in October 1986 as Sports Correspondent. He was given his first assignment on day one – to cover England's successful Ashes tour of Australia, as well as the America's Cup. He stayed in Australia for four months and during this time unexpectedly found himself reporting on the "Spycatcher" trial.

=== 1990s ===
Austin covered all the major sporting events for ITV News, including the Olympics, Wimbledon, The Open Championship, rugby internationals, football news and cricket.

He was one of the first British journalists to report from the Gulf during the Iraqi invasion of Kuwait in 1990. From the start of the war early in 1991, he was in Bahrain, the base for many of the Tornado squadrons, sending back regular reports including those on the recapture of the islands of Qaruh and Um-al-Maradin.

Austin was based in Hong Kong in 1993 as Asia Correspondent for ITV News. He returned there for his second tour as Asia Correspondent in 1996, spending over two years reporting, including the handover of the island to the Chinese in July 1997. He returned to London in mid-1998.

1994–1995 saw Austin in Johannesburg as Africa Correspondent for ITV News. Austin reported on the transition from apartheid to democracy in South Africa, Nelson Mandela's election victory, and on the civil war in Rwanda. He also briefly returned to sport as part of ITV's presentation team in South Africa for the 1995 Rugby World Cup coverage.

During 1995, he also covered the Bosnian crisis, following the fall of Srebrenica. His reporting won him a joint gold medal, with fellow-correspondent Paul Davies, at the 1996 Film and Television Festival of New York.

In 1999, Austin covered the War in Kosovo. Based on the Albanian border for much of the conflict, Austin reported on the refugee crisis caused by the war. On the day in June NATO troops finally entered Kosovo he was airlifted in with the Gurkhas, the first troops to enter the country, reporting on their role as mine clearers, and witnessing an early confrontation with Serb police. Austin's reporting of the war was part of ITV News' coverage which received a Gold Nymph at the 1999 Monte Carlo Television Festival.

=== 2000s ===
In September 2001, he covered the 9/11 attacks in New York and Washington before reporting on the War in Afghanistan. In 2001, he presented the first series of ITV reality series Survivor.

In 2002, Austin was promoted to ITV News' flagship news programme, the ITV Evening News. He also reported on the invasion of Iraq in March 2003, where coalition troops invaded to remove Saddam Hussein from power. This saw Austin spend long periods of time in Iraq. In October 2006, Austin travelled to Beijing as part of a series of reports on China's economic growth. Austin had been to Beijing many times previously and covered the Tiananmen Square uprising in 1989.

Austin became chief presenter of ITV News when Trevor McDonald retired on 15 December 2005. He took up the role of presenting the flagship ITV News programme on 3 January 2006. Austin also co-presented an ITV prime-time crime programme, Manhunt - Solving Britain's Crimes, a live 90 minute programme appealing to the public for information on the UK's most wanted criminals.

On 31 October 2007, ITV confirmed they would be resurrecting the News at Ten in 2008. Trevor McDonald would return as host with Sky News presenter Julie Etchingham co-anchoring the bulletin every night. In August 2008, Austin reported and presented for ITV News' Olympics: Beijing 2008 coverage. On 30 October 2008, ITV confirmed Trevor McDonald was stepping down from News at Ten and Austin would replace him. It was announced in August 2009, that Austin would be replaced by Alastair Stewart on the ITV Evening News, in order for Austin to concentrate on his duties on News at Ten.

=== 2010s ===
On 22 March 2013, Austin presented Who Killed My Dad? The Death of Terry Lloyd, which explained the death of his colleague Terry Lloyd. He co-presented the programme with Lloyd's daughter Chelsey.

On 6 December 2013, following the death of Nelson Mandela the previous day, Austin fronted a tribute programme Nelson Mandela: His Life and Legacy. In October 2015, Austin was replaced by Tom Bradby on ITV News at Ten. He then moved back to the ITV Evening News, presenting alongside Mary Nightingale.

In 2016, Austin guest presented numerous episodes of Good Morning Britain alongside Ranvir Singh and Charlotte Hawkins.

After thirty years with ITV News, it was announced in October 2016, that Austin would be leaving at the end of the year. He presented his last programme on 22 December 2016.

Austin joined LBC Radio for a series of guest shows across the Easter weekend in April 2017. On 24 April 2017, it was announced that Austin would join Sky News as a U.S. correspondent.

In August 2017, Austin co-presented a one-off documentary for Channel 4 called f with his daughter Madeleine.

In September 2018, Austin started presenting The News Hour with Mark Austin on Sky News, broadcast from Sky Central between 5pm to 6pm each weekday. He also presents Sky News at 6 between 6pm and 7pm each weekday.

=== 2020s ===
In February 2022, Austin presented Sky News live from Kyiv during the first day of the 2022 Russian invasion of Ukraine.

== Awards and honours ==
Austin has won 6 BAFTA awards. In 1995 for his role in ITV's Rwanda coverage; in 2010, for his role in the ITV News coverage of the Haiti earthquake; in 2011 for the Cumbria Murders coverage and in 2014 for reporting of the Woolwich attacks. With Sky News in 2020, Austin won a BAFTA for coverage of the Hong Kong protests. And in 2021, for a programme on the crisis in Idlib in Syria, also for Sky News

He won an international Emmy in 2000 for his reporting of the 2000 Mozambique floods, as well as a Golden Nymph at the 2000 Television Festival of Monte Carlo, and Gold and silver medals at the New York Television Programming Awards.

In 2014 and 2015, Austin won the 'RTS Presenter of the Year Award'.

- In 1993, he won top prize in the Sports News category at the Royal Television Society Awards for his coverage of the drug scandal affecting three British sportsmen at the 1992 Summer Olympics in Barcelona.
- He was awarded an honorary doctorate in November 2008 by Bournemouth University.

== Personal life ==
Austin lives in Barnes, London with his wife Catherine, an A&E doctor, and their three children.

== Career ==
Year	Title	Role	Episodes
1993	ITV News	Asia Correspondent	
1994–1995	ITV News	Africa Correspondent	
1996–2002	ITV News	Correspondent	
1999–2001	ITV Nightly News	Relief presenter	
1999–2015	ITV Weekend News	Occasional presenter	
2001	Survivor	Presenter	
2002–2004, 2008–2015	ITV News at Ten	Relief presenter Main presenter	
2002–2007, 2015–2016; 2008–2015	ITV Evening News	Main presenter Deputy presenter	
2005–2008	ITV News at 10.30	Main presenter	
2005	Celebrity Who Wants to Be a Millionaire?	Contestant	Single episode
2006–2007	Manhunt – Solving Britain's Crimes	Co-presenter	
2008	The Late News	Co-presenter	
2008–2011	Real Crime with Mark Austin	Presenter	4 series
2013	Daybreak	Guest	Single episode
2013	Who Killed My Dad? The Death of Terry Lloyd	Co-presenter	Single episode
2013	Nelson Mandela: His Life and Legacy	Presenter	Single episode
2013, 2015, 2016	Ant & Dec's Saturday Night Takeaway	Himself	Guest appearances
2015	And Here is the News	Contributor	Single episode
2016	Good Morning Britain	Guest presenter	Five episodes
2017	Wasting Away: The Truth About Anorexia	Presenter	One-off documentary
2017–2018	Sky News	U.S. correspondent	
2018–present	The News Hour; Sky News at 6	Main presenter	

Media offices
Preceded by Alastair Stewart	Male co-host, ITV Evening News; 2015–2016	Succeeded by N/A
Preceded by Sir Trevor McDonald	Male host, ITV News at Ten; 2008–2015	Succeeded by Tom Bradby
Preceded by Sir Trevor McDonald	Main host, ITV News at 10.30; 2005–2008	Succeeded by N/A
Preceded by Dermot Murnaghan	Male co-host, ITV Evening News; 2002–2009	Succeeded by Alastair Stewart
