= Cash Flow (TV program) =

- The caption of Cash Flow when it was broadcast from CNBC Asia's Australian studios in Sydney.
- Also known as: Cash Flow from Australia
- Genre: business news program
- Presented by: Maura Fogarty (2007–2010); Amanda Drury (2007–2010); Oriel Morrison (2010–2014); Bernard Lo (2010–2014)
- Country of origin: Australia
- Original language: English

Production
- Production locations: Singapore (2007–2010); Sydney, Australia (2010–2014)
- Running time: 120 minutes

Original release
- Network: CNBC Asia
- Release: 26 March 2007 – 28 March 2014

Related
- CNBC Asia: Asia Market Watch; Street Signs

Cash Flow (formerly CNBC's Cash Flow and Cash Flow from Australia) was a television business news program on CNBC Asia. It was produced by CNBC Asia from Singapore by a team of journalists and aired each weekday at 10:00 am Singapore/Hong Kong/Taiwan time. It was broadcast live from CNBC Asia's studio in Sydney and presented by Oriel Morrison and at Hong Kong's studio presented by Bernard Lo for the first hour. It was originally presented by Maura Fogarty for the first hour and Amanda Drury for the second hour and was broadcast live from Singapore. Cash Flow was seen in the United States on the CNBC World channel every Sunday through Thursday at 10:00 pm Eastern Time (9:00 pm ET without Daylight Saving Time) and on CNBC Europe at 3:00 UTC

== Program Facts ==
- Cash Flow, which debuted on 26 March 2007 as CNBC's Cash Flow, replaced Asia Market Watch (also anchored by Amanda Drury), a mid-morning Asian market program that followed ongoing stock market trading in Asia. The show was given a clear mandate—to provide actionable strategies on investments and help viewers make sense of the morning's news flow.

This was part of CNBC Asia's significant programming revamp that resulted in the cancellation of Asia Market Watch, and the debut of Squawk Australia, which moved Asia Squawk Box (which Drury co-anchored with Martin Soong) down an hour.

- The second hour of Cash Flow is also seen in the Philippines over ANC. ANC, however has the option of pre-empting the simulcast in case of breaking news or live events such as Senate/House hearings and Christmas/Year End programs of ANC's shows.
- It features stock reports from CNBC reporters around the Asia Pacific region including Emily Chan (Hong Kong), Kaori Enjoji (Tokyo), Cheng Lei (Shanghai) and Tanvir Gill of CNBC-TV18 (Mumbai). Plus Sri Jegarajah and Adam Bakhtiar at CNBC Asia's Singapore studios.
- Cash Flow started broadcasting from the news room set in July 2009. The move out of the virtual set means that all CNBC Asia programs now originate from a hard set. This program moved to Sydney in 2010, after Maura Fogarty departed from the network.
- Trading Matters, once a standalone programme on the network wrapping-up the trading day in Australia was folded to become a segment on Cash Flow at around 11.40 HK/SIN time. It now features live reports from the Australian Stock Exchange and analysis of stories from down under.
- On 14 June 2010, CNBC's Cash Flow was renamed Cash Flow From Australia to reflect the program's change of location. Oriel Morrison became the sole anchor of the program, replacing original anchors Amanda Drury and Maura Fogarty.
- On 2 January 2013, Cash Flow From Australia was shortened to Cash Flow, dropping the second half of the program's name (From Australia) from the title.

== See also ==
- Asia Market Watch (the program Cash Flow replaced)
- The Call (a late-morning CNBC US program that follows ongoing stock market trading in the US)
