= CNBC Asia =

Southeast Asian pay television channel

- Logo used since 2025
- Country: Singapore
- Broadcast area: Asia-Pacific and MENA (including Singapore and except Mainland China (residential) and North Korea); Worldwide
- Headquarters: Mapletree Business City; Singapore

Programming
- Language: English
- Picture format: 1080i 16:9 HDTV

Ownership
- Owner: Versant
- Sister channels: Golf Channel; CNBC World

History
- Launched: 20 June 1995; 31 years ago
- Replaced: Asia Business News

Links
- Website: Official website

CNBC Asia is a Singapore-based business news channel owned by Versant. It is a pan-Asian branch of the U.S.-based CNBC.

The channel launched on 20 June 1995 out of Hong Kong. In 1998, the channel merged with Dow Jones' Asia Business News and relocated to its facilities in Singapore. The network maintains bureaus across the Asia–Pacific region.

== History ==
CNBC Asia was announced in 1995 as a localised version of CNBC for the Asia-Pacific region. The network was expected to feature 10 hours of programming per day from its studio in Hong Kong, along with bureaus in Bombay, Singapore, and Tokyo. The rest of its programming would be sourced from CNBC Europe and its U.S. counterpart. NBC Asia chairman Patrick Cox expected that the network would reach five million homes by the end of its first year on-air. In January 1995, a "preview" known as ANBC launched, which carried a mix of programming from CNBC US and CNBC Europe on Galaxy in Australia and Wharf Cable in Hong Kong. CNBC Asia officially launched on 20 June 1995.

The network would be a competitor to the Singapore-based Asia Business News (ABN), a joint venture between Dow Jones & Company, Tele-Communications Inc., TVNZ, and other local investors which launched in 1993. There were doubts that the two competing business news channels in the market would be viable; ABN CEO Paul France derided CNBC Asia as being "an Asian branch of an American company." However, as early as November 1995, it was reported that NBC and Dow Jones were considering a merger of their business news channels in Asia and Europe, including ABN and its European counterpart, European Business News (EBN).

In March 1997, CNBC Asia expanded its carriage on cable in India via an agreement with the Hinduja Group.

=== Merger with ABN ===
Renewed negotiations between NBC and Dow Jones surfaced in November 1997 amid financial difficulties at the companies' Asian and European operations. Dow Jones had been operating at a loss of US$48 million, and CNBC at $40 million.

On 10 December 1997, Dow Jones and NBC announced a 15-year strategic partnership, under which ABN and EBN would merge with CNBC Asia and CNBC Europe, respectively, and CNBC US would be able to enter into editorial partnerships with Dow Jones publications such as The Wall Street Journal and Barron's. The merged operation would retain the CNBC branding, but be overseen by Paul France, and relocate to ABN's Singapore studios—resulting in layoffs of 150 employees from its Hong Kong bureau, with many being hired by the upstart Bloomberg Television Asia–Pacific channel which took over the ABN's channel space and CNBC Asia's original Hong Kong headquarters.

The merger took effect on-air on 2 February 1998, with the channel being rebranded as CNBC–Asia Business News for a transitional period. Citing cost issues and a plan to focus exclusively on Asian business news, simulcasts of CNBC US programmes were dropped from its overnight schedule in favour of reruns of domestic programmes. After the decision was poorly received by viewers, CNBC's U.S. business day programmes were reinstated in March.

The merger impacted ABN's Indian network, ABNi, which was a joint venture with Hinduja Group and TV18; prior to the announcement of the Dow Jones agreement, Hinduja had sold its stake in the channel, and TV18's agreement on the venture did not contain any provisions on what would occur in the event of a change in ownership. After discussions with a CNBC lawyer and France, TV18 would reach an agreement with CNBC to serve as its Indian partner, and would also launch CNBC India (now CNBC TV18) the following year.

In October 1999, CNBC Asia had a partnership with the Australian Financial Review to present The Australian Financial Review Market Wrap, a daily round-up of market news from the Australian region hosted by James Walker and Grace Phan. Major programming changes occurred on 30 October 2000 with CNBC Asia expanding Asia Squawk Box to two hours, Asia Market Watch to two hours in the morning and 1½ hours in the afternoon and Power Lunch Asia to one full hour. CNBC Asia's ticker was also reformatted on that day to include colours reflecting a change in the stock prices (green for an increase and red for a decrease) and a stock's ticker symbol.

In 2001, CNBC Asia introduced localised tickers to audiences in Australia, Hong Kong and Singapore and has since kept the ticker on the screen during commercial breaks.

In July 2001, Asia Squawk Box was further extended to three hours and more programming hours from CNBC US and CNBC Europe were added to the line-up. This was further extended in 2002 when U.S. programming started at 20.00 UTC+8 time uninterrupted on weeknights.

=== 2005–present: Post-merger ===
In July 2005, Dow Jones exited its joint ventures with CNBC, putting them entirely under the ownership of NBC Universal. In March 2007, CNBC Asia announced that it would expand its presence in Australia, including establishing a new Sydney bureau (initially based out of a local General Electric office, with a studio under construction at the Burns Philp Building across from Sydney Exchange Square), and premiering Squawk Australia—an hour-long program preceding Asia Squawk Box to cover the opening of the Australian markets. The following month, CNBC launched Worldwide Exchange, a new international business program that would be simulcast across CNBC in Asia, Europe, and the United States.

CNBC Asia also launched two brand new shows that replaced Market Watch and the CNBC Europe programme Today's Business; CNBC's Cash Flow, anchored by Maura Fogarty (first hour) and Amanda Drury (second hour), was originally intensely trader and investor based. Following the success of Worldwide Exchange, another joint production, Capital Connection, was launched. It was originally anchored by Maura Fogarty in Singapore and Steve Sedgwick in London. Unlike Worldwide Exchange, which was originally produced by CNBC Europe (until production of that show was relocated to CNBC US on 4 January 2016), Capital Connection was produced by CNBC Asia.

On 27 September 2007, CNBC Asia announced two additional shows from Sydney, Trading Matters—a wrap-up of the day's market action, and Australia This Week. Both shows were anchored by then-newly appointed CNBC anchor Oriel Morrison, formerly of the Nine Network and Bloomberg Television. The shows debuted on 2 and 6 October 2007, respectively, as the channel officially opened its new Burns Philip Building studios. The move also saw CNBC Australia reintroduce opt-outs from the pan-Asian feed for additional airings of Trading Matters and Australia This Week.

In August 2008, The Daily Telegraph reported that Channel Nine's finance reporter Karen Tso, would be joining the network in October 2008. She became the Sydney-based correspondent of CNBC and anchored Squawk Australia, thus replacing Jeffrey James. In mid-2009, CNBC Asia launched a new personal finance show as an opt-out in Australia, The Barefoot Investor, with Australian personal finance expert Scott Pape.

In June 2010, CNBC Asia relocated to a new studio at the Singapore Exchange. This coincided with changes to the network's lineup, including the cancellation of Squawk Australia and re-expansion of Asia Squawk Box to a three-hour format, and the new program The Call. On 31 March 2014, CNBC replaced The Call and Cash Flow with the early morning show The Rundown and a local version of Street Signs. Asia Squawk Box also relocated to a new studio in Hong Kong. In 2019, Asia Squawk Box returned to Singapore with a new anchor lineup.

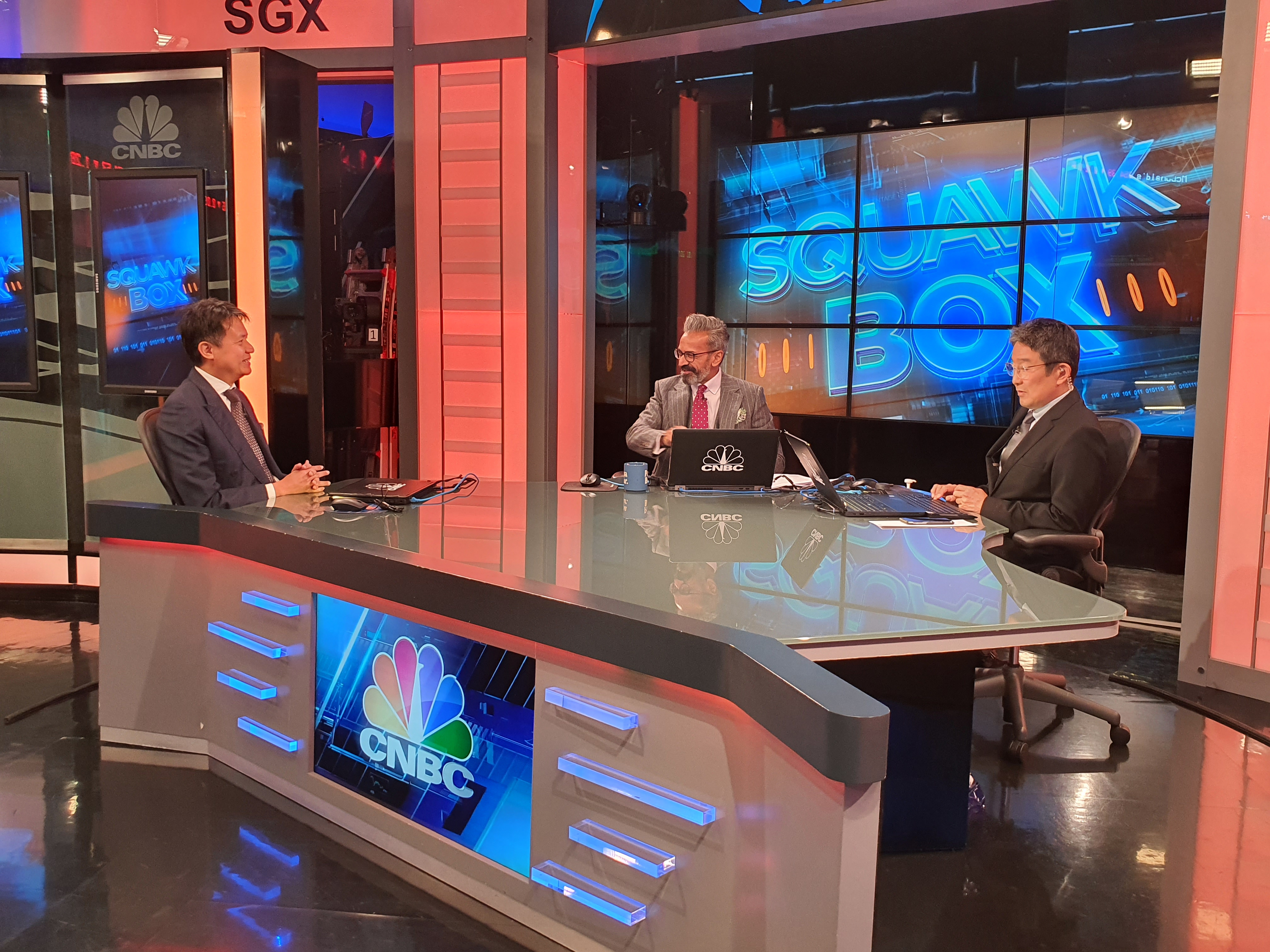
CNBC Singapore Studio in 2022

In June 2023, CNBC Asia set up a new office in Mapletree Business City. Facilities include a master control room, a production control room for social media platforms and a small studio.

On 22 July 2024, CNBC Asia updated its on-air presentation and branding to match the new CNBC US branding that was first introduced on 11 December 2023.

On 7 April 2025, CNBC Asia revamped its programming schedule by introducing the new programmes US Markets Edition (a recap of news from the previous U.S. trading day), The China Connection, Inside India, and Access Middle East.

On 3 September 2026, it was reported that CNBC would close its Hong Kong bureau at Central Plaza in Wan Chai, and cancel Inside India, The China Connection, Europe Early Edition, as well as CNBC Meets and Built for Billions.

== Programming ==
=== Weekday line-up ===
CNBC Asia produces five hours of business programming each weekday, of which four are live. The channel's weekday business day programmes (pan-Asian feed) are:

- US Markets Edition – various CNBC US staff (Englewood Ciffs, New Jersey) (Tuesday - Friday)
- Squawk Box Asia – Sri Jegarajah (Singapore) and JP Ong. Amanda Drury occasionally co-hosts from Sydney
- Access: Middle East – Dan Murphy (Dubai)

In addition, CNBC Asia produces a weekly interview show - Managing Asia, presented by Christine Tan.

At other times of the weekday, business-day programmes from CNBC Europe and CNBC US are simulcast on the channel.

=== Weekends ===
CNBC Asia broadcasts lifestyle and sporting programmes, branded under CNBC Weekends, showings of CNBC US documentaries and weekly business shows such as Managing Asia, The Brave Ones, Marketing.Media.Money, The CNBC Conversation, American Greed, Tech Transformers, Channel Japan, Meet China, CNBC Tech: The Edge. Back-to-back editions of The Tonight Show Starring Jimmy Fallon and Late Night with Seth Meyers are shown during the evening.

=== End-of-year programming ===
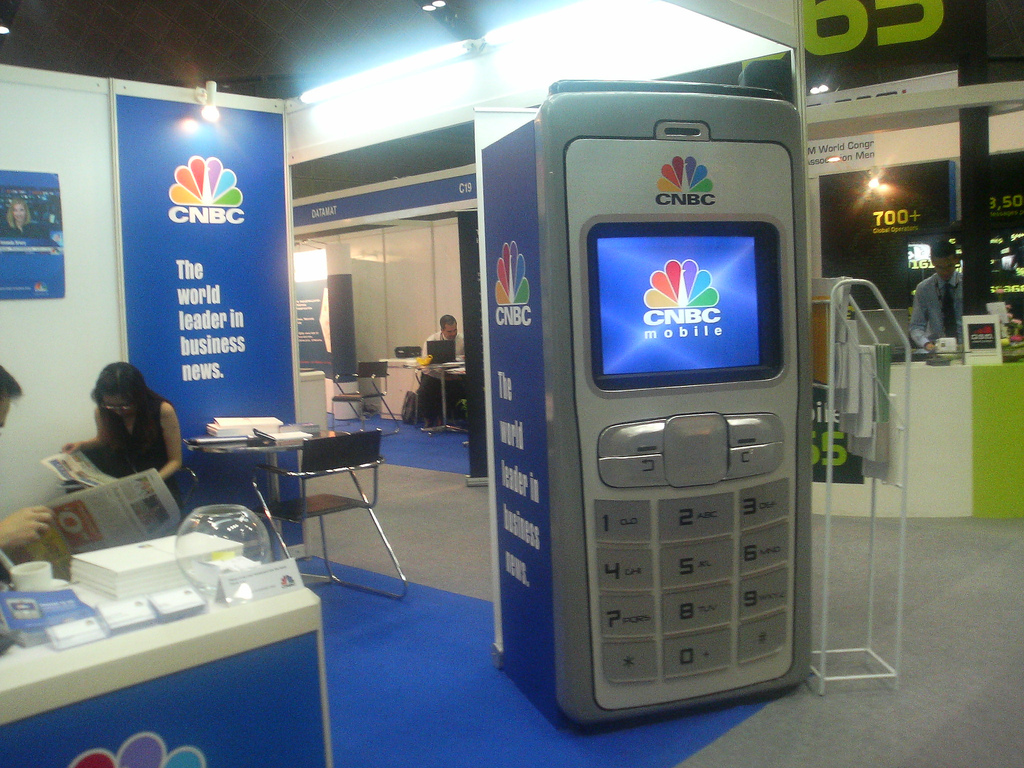
CNBC Asia outside broadcasting 2006

On trading days over the Christmas and new year period, CNBC Asia cuts back its regional programming with live output restricted to a two-hour edition of Squawk Box Asia. Pre-taped specials air at all other times. Simulcasts of programmes originating from CNBC US and CNBC Europe remains unaffected. Regular programming resumes immediately after the New Year's Day holiday.

=== Former programmes ===
Among the shows that have been cancelled are:

==== Weekdays ====
- Lunch Money (2 February 1998 – 29 October 1999, replaced by Power Lunch Asia on 1 November 1999)
- Breakfast Briefing (2 February 1998 – 31 March 2000, replaced by CNBC Today on 3 April 2000)
- Trading Day (2 February 1998 – 31 March 2000, replaced by Asia Market Watch and European Market Watch on 3 April 2000)
- Asia Nightly News (2 February 1998 – 30 June 2000, replaced by e on 3 July 2000)
- Global Market Watch (3 April 2000 – 27 October 2000, replaced by Business Center on 30 October 2000)
- The Australian Financial Review Market Wrap (1 November 1999 – 29 December 2000, replaced by Australia Market Wrap)
- CNBC Today (3 April 2000 – 15 March 2002, replaced by Asia Wake Up Call on 18 March 2002)
- Wake Up Call (18 March 2002 – 28 March 2003, replaced by Asia Squawk Box on 31 March 2003)
- Power Lunch Asia (1 November 1999 – 28 March 2003, replaced by Meet The Press and US Business Center on 31 March 2003 after Rico Hizon's leave)
- Australia Market Wrap (1 January 2001 – 2 January 2004)
- Australia Market Week (6 April 2001 – 2 January 2004)
- Business Centre Australia (January 2001 – 2 January 2004)
- Business Center (30 October 2000 – 15 February 2005, replaced by CNBC Tonight)
- e (5 April 2000 – 15 February 2005, replaced by CNBC Tonight)
- The Asian Wall Street Journal (2 February 1998 – 15 February 2005, replaced by CNBC Tonight)
- Asia Market Wrap (2 February 1998 – 2 December 2005, replaced by Squawk Box Europe then Worldwide Exchange on 19 December 2005)
- CNBC Tonight (16 February 2005 – 16 December 2005, replaced by Worldwide Exchange)
- Market Watch (3 April 2000 – 23 March 2007, replaced by CNBC's Cash Flow and Asia Squawk Box on 26 March 2007)
- Cash Flow (originally CNBC's Cash Flow, then Cash Flow From Australia; 26 March 2007 – 28 March 2014, replaced by Street Signs)
- The Call (14 June 2010 – 28 March 2014)
- The Rundown (31 March 2014 – 26 October 2018)
- Capital Connection (26 March 2007 – 4 April 2025, replaced by Access Middle East)
- The China Connection (7 April 2025 – August 2026)
- Inside India (7 April 2025 – August 2026)

==== Primetime and weekends ====
- Generation e (replaced by CNBC Tonight)
- CEO Australia
- dot.commerce (replaced by e in April 2000)
- Far Eastern Economic Review or Review On Air (cancelled in April 2001)
- Driven (cancelled in 2000)
- Over Asia (cancelled in 1999)
- New Company
- Lo & Company
- Asian Working Woman (cancelled in April 2001)
- Smart Money (cancelled in 2000)
- Challenging Asia (cancelled in 2000)
- Storyboard (cancelled 29 October 2000)
- Asia This Week (cancelled in March 2003 after Rico Hizon's leave)
- Inside China

=== Sports coverage ===
- Golf Channel (Golf on NBC)
- PGA Tour
- Masters Tournament
- PGA Championship
- U.S. Open
- The Open Championship (British Open)
- European Tour
- Asian Tour

=== Simulcasts outside the region ===
In the US, all of CNBC Asia's daytime programmes are seen on CNBC World.

In Europe, during the mid to late 2000s, CNBC Europe had chosen to scale back simulcasts of CNBC Asia programming overnight in favour of teleshopping, and later on in the 2000s, poker games, and CNBC Asia's full morning line-up had was seen on Monday mornings. During the rest of the week, only the final hour of CNBC Asia's programming, plus Capital Connection, was seen on CNBC Europe. However, in 2009, CNBC Europe began showing almost the entire CNBC Asia schedule throughout the week, joining CNBC Asia at midnight UK time, 1am CET, with the full schedule broadcast on Monday mornings. The April 2025 schedule changes saw CNBC Europe broadcast the entire CNBC Asia programming block every day for the first time.

== On-air staff ==
Staff are based in Singapore unless stated otherwise.

=== Current ===
- Amanda Drury (Sydney)
- Kaori Enjoji (Tokyo)
- Sri Jegarajah
- Lisa Kim – East Asia reporter
- Dan Murphy (Dubai)
- JP Ong – South-east Asia reporter
- Monica Pitrelli – transport and travel reporter
- Martin Soong
- Christine Tan
- Emily Tan (Hong Kong) – senior correspondent covering China, Hong Kong and Taiwan markets
- Eunice Yoon (Beijing) – chief China correspondent

=== Former ===
==== Anchors/presenters ====
- Andrea Catherwood (now presenting and contributing to programmes in the UK)
- Tanvir Gill
- Aaron Heslehurst (now with BBC World News)
- Rico Hizon (later with BBC World News and CNN Philippines, now with ANC)
- Nancy Hungerford (left CNBC on July 2, 2021)
- Fauziah Ibrahim (now with ABC News (Australia))
- Jeffrey James (now based in China
- Mark Laudi (now runs his own consultancy, Mark Laudi and Associates)
- May Lee (her "Oprah"-style talk show on STAR World premiered in May 2008)
- Susan Li (moved to CNBC Europe and later to CNBC US; left in August 2017, now with Fox Business)
- Bernard Lo
- Dalton Tanonaka (now with Metro TV)
- Karen Tso (now based at CNBC Europe as co-anchor of Squawk Box Europe)

==== Correspondents ====
- Tracey Chang (now with CCTV)
- Geoff Cutmore (later with CNBC Europe, hosting Squawk Box Europe until June 2023)
- Stephen Engle (now with Bloomberg Television as their Beijing correspondent)
- Cheng Lei (journalist) (arrested in February 2021 "on suspicion of illegally supplying state secrets overseas")
- Betty Liu (later with Bloomberg Television, New York studios; left the television industry in May 2018)
- Jane Ong (now with Burson-Marsteller Asia Pacific)
- Colette Wong (later with Fox Sports Asia and Fox Sports News Asia until its demise in September 2021)

== Other CNBC Asia Services and partnerships ==
=== CNBC-based channels ===
In conjunction with local partners it provides the following local channels:

- CNBC TV18 (in India, formerly CNBC India)
- CNBC Infinitey (in India)
- CNBC Awaaz (in India)
- CNBC Bajar (in India)
- CNBC Prime (in India)
- CNBC Tamilin (in India)
- Nikkei CNBC (in Japan)
- CNBC Pakistan (now closed)
- SBS-CNBC (in Korea)
- CNBC Indonesia (in Indonesia)
- JKN-CNBC (in Thailand)

=== Other TV and print partners ===
- Seoul Broadcasting System (SBS) (in South Korea)
  - Formerly MBN CNBC was also provided in Korea. However CNBC Asia and MBN agreed to dissolve their partnership in July 2005.
  - From January 2010. SBS CNBC is provided. This channel is managed with Seoul Broadcasting System (SBS).
- In the Philippines, the second hour of CNBC's Street Signs is simulcasted on ANC. Managing Asia is also shown on ANC at 8.30 local time on Saturdays. However, ANC and CNBC ended their partnership in 2016. In 2001-2002 CNBC on ZOE TV (now Light TV and A2Z) in 24/7 Business News Channel on Free TV.
- Even after Dow Jones Newswires had sold its stake to NBC Universal, correspondents from Dow Jones Newswires and The Wall Street Journal Asia continued contributing to the channel.

=== Airline partners ===
Managing Asia can be seen on Singapore Airlines and Jet Airways.
