= Australia This Week =

- Genre: business news program
- Presented by: Oriel Morrison
- Country of origin: Australia
- Original language: English

Production
- Running time: 30 minutes

Original release
- Network: CNBC Asia, CNBC Australia
- Release: 6 October 2007

Australia This Week was a television business news program that aired on Friday and across the weekend on CNBC Asia. When daylight saving time is in effect in Australia, the program was first shown live across the network's pan-Asian feed at 5 p.m. Sydney time (2 p.m. Singapore/Hong Kong/Taiwan time). At other times, the program was relayed live in Australia only, and rebroadcast 30 minutes later (3:30 p.m. in the UTC+8 time zone) on the channel's pan-Asian feed. It was produced from CNBC Asia's Australia studio in Sydney, and anchored by Oriel Morrison.

The program served as a review of the week's trading in Australia, featuring analysis from money managers and investors and excerpts from the major interviews from the week's editions of Squawk Australia and Trading Matters. Australia This Week premiered on CNBC Asia on 6 October 2007 as part of a major push into the Australian market by the network.

Australia This Week was also part of the weekend programming line-ups of CNBC Europe and CNBC World.
