= The Call (American TV program) =

Television business news

- Genre: Business news program
- Presented by: Larry Kudlow (2008–2011); Melissa Francis (2007–2011); Trish Regan (2007–2011); Dylan Ratigan (2007–2008); Liz Claman; Tyler Mathisen; Ted David; Mark Haines; Michelle Caruso-Cabrera; Martha MacCallum
- Country of origin: United States
- Original language: English

Production
- Running time: 60 minutes

Original release
- Network: CNBC
- Release: January 19, 1998 – October 14, 2011

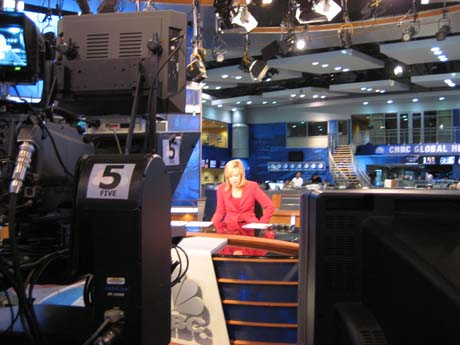
Melissa Francis during The Call

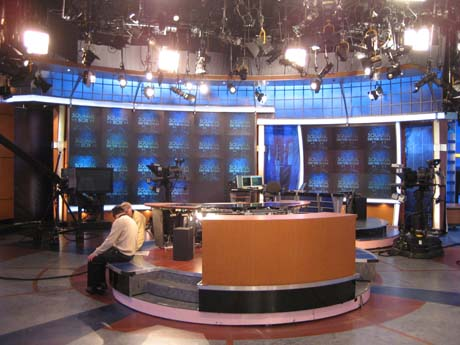
The set where The Call broadcast from

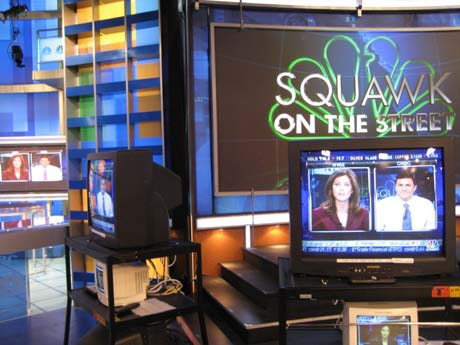
The screen wall The Call uses

The Call is an American television business news program which aired on CNBC between 11 am to 12 noon ET weekdays from August 2007 to October 2011. Previous programs shown in the same time slot were The Money Wheel with Ted David and Martha MacCallum, Market Watch and Morning Call. The Call offered a clear focus on real-time market coverage at the heart of the trading day.

== About the program ==
=== Morning Call ===
Morning Call aired on CNBC, from 10AM to 12 noon ET weekdays. The show had premiered as Midday Call on February 4, 2002, and offered a clear focus on real-time market coverage at the heart of the trading day. Previous programs shown in the same time slot were The Money Wheel with Ted David and Martha MacCallum (who later joined Fox News Channel) and Market Watch.

On February 3, 2006, Ted David, who had co-anchored Morning Call with Liz Claman since 2003, left the program while being promoted to senior anchor at CNBC Business Radio. From 2006-02-06 to 2007-07-17, Claman was joined in the 10-11am hour by Mark Haines (who reported from the New York Stock Exchange), and in the 11am-noon hour by various anchors, including Dylan Ratigan (see anchor roster below).

On July 20, 2007, CNBC replaced the first hour of the two-hour program with an expanded Squawk on the Street, due in part to Claman's departure from the network (which she joined Fox News Channel's sister network financial unit three months later). Dylan Ratigan and Trish Regan served as interim anchors for the program, which was completely revamped on 2007-07-23. In addition to the aforementioned 2007-07-23 revamp, the anchors were joined on set by a guest contributor, very similar to Squawk Box.

=== The Call ===
On August 8, 2007, the show was renamed The Call. The name change to The Call with Dylan Ratigan (who left the show in late 2008 and was replaced by Larry Kudlow), Melissa Francis, and Trish Regan on that date was due in part to avoid confusion with the early-morning Bloomberg Television program of the same name.

Until July 19, 2007, CNBC aired Morning Call from 10AM to 12 noon ET weekdays. The next day, CNBC replaced the first hour of the two-hour program with an expanded Squawk on the Street, due in part to Liz Claman's departure from the network (she joined the Fox Business Network three months later). The program was completely revamped on July 23, 2007, and renamed The Call on August 7, 2007, with Dylan Ratigan and Trish Regan serving as interim anchors. Ratigan (live from the New York Stock Exchange), Regan and Melissa Francis were appointed permanent co-anchors as of October 8, 2007. In addition to the aforementioned July 2007 revamp, the anchors were joined on set by a guest contributor, very similar to Squawk Box.

Dylan Ratigan left The Call in late 2008 as he was replaced with Larry Kudlow. Melissa Francis and Trish Regan both remained on the program, with Francis anchoring alongside Kudlow at the network's Englewood Cliffs studio and Regan anchoring at the NYSE. Ratigan ultimately left CNBC altogether in March 2009. Trish Regan departed from CNBC 2 years later (March 2011). Amanda Drury (formerly of CNBC Asia) replaced Regan as co-host until she left for Street Signs in mid-2011.

Regular reporters included Bob Pisani (NYSE), Scott Wapner (NASDAQ), Sharon Epperson (NYMEX), Rick Santelli (Chicago), Steve Liesman, David Faber and Brian Shactman.

On February 3, 2006, Ted David, who had co-anchored Morning Call with Liz Claman since 2003, left the program while being promoted to senior anchor at CNBC Business Radio. From 2006-02-06 to 2007-07-17, Claman was joined in the 10-11am hour by Mark Haines (who reported from the New York Stock Exchange), and in the 11am-noon hour by various anchors, including Dylan Ratigan (see anchor roster below).

On July 20, 2007, CNBC replaced the first hour of the two-hour program with an expanded Squawk on the Street, due in part to Claman's departure from the network (which she joined Fox News Channel's sister network financial unit three months later). Dylan Ratigan and Trish Regan served as interim anchors for the program, which was completely revamped on 2007-07-23. In addition to the aforementioned 2007-07-23 revamp, the anchors were joined on set by a guest contributor, very similar to Squawk Box.

On August 8, 2007, the show was renamedby The Call. The name change to The Call with Dylan Ratigan (who left the show in late 2008 and was replaced by Larry Kudlow), Melissa Francis, and Trish Regan on that date was due in part to avoid confusion with the early-morning Bloomberg Television program of the same name.

Until July 19, 2007, CNBC aired Morning Call from 10AM to 12 noon ET weekdays. The next day, CNBC replaced the first hour of the two-hour program with an expanded Squawk on the Street, due in part to Liz Claman's departure from the network (she joined the Fox Business Network three months later). The program was completely revamped on July 23, 2007, and renamed The Call on August 7, 2007, with Dylan Ratigan and Trish Regan serving as interim anchors. Ratigan (live from the New York Stock Exchange), Regan and Melissa Francis were appointed permanent co-anchors as of October 8, 2007. In addition to the aforementioned July 2007 revamp, the anchors were joined on set by a guest contributor, very similar to Squawk Box.

Dylan Ratigan left The Call in late 2008 as he was replaced with Larry Kudlow. Melissa Francis and Trish Regan both remained on the program, with Francis anchoring alongside Kudlow at the network's Englewood Cliffs studio and Regan anchoring at the NYSE. Ratigan ultimately left CNBC altogether in March 2009. Trish Regan departed from CNBC 2 years later (March 2011). Amanda Drury (formerly of CNBC Asia) replaced Regan as co-host until she left for Street Signs in mid-2011.

Regular reporters included Bob Pisani (NYSE), Scott Wapner (NASDAQ), Sharon Epperson (NYMEX), Rick Santelli (Chicago), Steve Liesman, David Faber and Brian Shactman.

=== Morning Call ===
On March 23, 2026, Morning Call returned, replacing Worldwide Exchange. It airs betewen 5am ET and 6am ET.

== Segments ==
- Here's The Call On...: The appropriately titled first segment of the show (discontinued since October 2007) looks at the morning's business headlines.
- The Bond Report: Rick Santelli reports from Chicago with a look at the United States Bond market.
- Your Best Trades Now: A guest joins the show with the anchors and a guest contributor to talk about what his/her best stock picks are right now.
- Stocks To Watch: In this segment, we look at the United States stocks making news.
- MSNBC News Update: News headlines from MSNBC. Seen shortly after the bottom of the hour.
- 2 Hours Into the Trading Day...: An update on the U.S. stock markets after the first 2 hours of trading. Seen at the start of the program's second half-hour.
- CNBC.com Blog Watch: Seen during the program's second half-hour with a look at the key business stories blogged by CNBC reporters, such as Jim Goldman ("Tech Check"), Mike Huckman ("Pharma's Market"), Diana Olick ("Realty Check") and Darren Rovell ("Sports Biz").
- The Journal Report: Seen on Mondays with a reporter from The Wall Street Journal. This segment was discontinued at the end of 2007.
- Seidman Speaks: CNBC's chief commentator Bill Seidman made guest appearances and answered viewers' Email questions. This segment was seen on Thursdays, but was discontinued after Seidman's death in 2009.
- Mutual Fund Pick and Pan of the Week: Seen on Fridays with Christine Benz of Morningstar.
- West Coast Call: A guest from the West Coast joins the program, similar to the "West Coast Wake Up" segment on Squawk on the Street.
- The Last Call: The last segment of the program.

== Quote ==
"America is open for business coast-to-coast." This was the opening phrase used at the start of the show just before the opening title sequence.

== CNBC Asia ==
On June 14, 2010, CNBC Asia debuted their own version of The Call. That program was anchored by Bernard Lo in Hong Kong, and ended on March 28, 2014.

== Cancellation ==
The United States version of The Call was cancelled October 14, 2011, and was replaced 3 days later by the newly expanded third hour of Squawk on the Street.

== See also ==
- Asia Market Watch (discontinued after March 23, 2007)
- Morning Exchange (discontinued after December 16, 2005)
- Worldwide Exchange
- Morning Call (former name of this program)
- CNBC's Cash Flow (a mid-morning business program airing on CNBC Asia)
- Fox Business (TV program) (a Fox Business Network program aired from 10 AM-3 ET)
- The Call (CNBC Asia's version of this program)
