= Street Signs (TV program) =

- Logo used on CNBC from October 13, 2014, through February 6, 2015, on CNBC Asia since February 9, 2015, and on CNBC Europe since its debut on January 4, 2016
- Genre: Business news program
- Presented by: Amanda Drury (2011–2015); Brian Sullivan (2011–2015); Erin Burnett (2006–2011); Ron Insana (1996–2002, 2003–2006); Maria Bartiromo (1999–2002); Martin Soong (Asia, 2014 – 2019); Oriel Morrison (Asia, 2014 – 2019); Tanvir Gill (Asia, 2019–2025); Nancy Hungerford (Asia, 2019–2021); Samantha Vadas (Asia, 2024–2025); Louisa Bojesen (Europe, 2016–2017); Carolin Roth (Europe, 2016–2018); Joumanna Bercetche (Europe, 2019–2024); Julianna Tatelbaum (Europe, 2023–2025)
- Countries of origin: United States (1996–2002 / 2003–2015); Singapore (Asia, 2014–2025); United Kingdom (Europe, 2016–2025)
- Original language: English

Production
- Production locations: Fort Lee, NJ (1996–2002); Englewood Cliffs, NJ (2003–2015); Singapore (Asia); London (Europe)
- Running time: 60 minutes 180 minutes (Asia); 60 minutes (Europe)

Original release
- Network: CNBC US
- Release: 1996 – February 1, 2002
- Release: December 8, 2003 – February 6, 2015
- Network: CNBC Asia
- Release: March 31, 2014 – April 4, 2025
- Network: CNBC Europe
- Release: January 4, 2016 – April 25, 2025

Street Signs was a television business program that originally aired on CNBC, and later aired on CNBC Asia and on CNBC Europe. Before the Asian version debuted on March 31, 2014, it was broadcast on CNBC at 2:00pm ET. The CNBC United States version's final episode aired on February 6, 2015, due to Power Lunch returning to a two-hour format. The European version of Street Signs, which aired in a one-hour format on CNBC Europe, debuted January 4, 2016.

== About the show ==
This program focused on the day's market action. In addition, prominent analysts, investors and executives regularly appeared on the program to offer their perspective.

=== CNBC ===
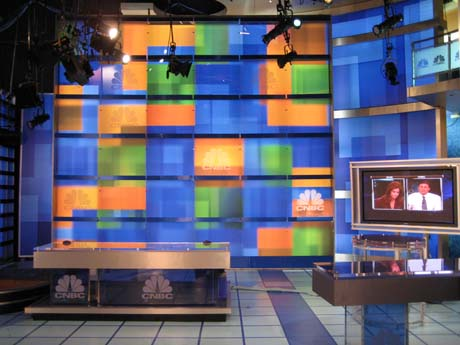
The former set of Street Signs (c. 2006 – April 2010)

Street Signs was originally a two-hour programme that aired on CNBC from 1996 to February 1, 2002. It was cancelled effective February 4, 2002, and Power Lunch occupied its vacated slot as a result of CNBC's revamped programming line-up. On December 8, 2003, former Business Center co-anchor and original host Ron Insana revived Street Signs. And in March 2006, Squawk on the Street co-anchor Erin Burnett replaced Insana as the programme's new host. Burnett left CNBC on May 6, 2011. After Erin Burnett's departure Amanda Drury (late of CNBC Asia) and Brian Sullivan (late of the Fox Business Network) became this program's new anchor team and were to be the show's final anchors.

On October 13, 2014, Street Signs was launched in full 1080i high-definition as part of CNBC's network-wide switch to a full 16:9 letterbox presentation.

One notable segment of the programme, which aired at 2:40pm ET, the "Stop Trading!" segment, was presented by Jim Cramer (host of another CNBC program, Mad Money). In this segment, which formerly aired on Closing Bell prior to September 11, 2006, the co-anchors asked Cramer about the stocks making news, and also asked him for his take on the day's markets. After the segment, a full-screen disclaimer was shown as Street Signs go to a commercial break. Cramer's "Stop Trading!" segment was moved to the end of the first hour of Squawk on the Street on February 9, 2015. Jim Cramer's on-air tirade about the weakening economy, which was seen during the "Stop Trading!" segment of this program on August 3, 2007, garnered widespread attention and helped galvanise the Federal Reserve Board to cut interest rates.

From its January 4, 2016, debut through September 30, 2020, on Mondays from October 12, 2020, to October 24, 2022, and again on weekdays since November 7, 2022, the European version of Street Signs is the only CNBC Europe program that is aired on CNBC's United States channel. Coincidentally (as previously mentioned), CNBC's own version of Street Signs aired its last show 11 months earlier, on February 6, 2015.

=== CNBC Asia ===
CNBC Asia's version of Street Signs debuted March 31, 2014, with Martin Soong and Oriel Morrison as co-anchors. Soong was previously a longtime co-anchor of Asia Squawk Box (he has since returned to that show in the same role) and Morrison was anchor of the now-cancelled Cash Flow. Beginning December 2, 2019, the anchor team consisted of Tanvir Gill and Nancy Hungerford, both of whom replaced Morrison and Soong as co-anchors on that date. Hungerford departed from CNBC on July 2, 2021, and since July 5 of that same year until early 2022, Gill has been working with other fill-in presenters, such as Amanda Drury (former co-anchor of the defunct US version) and Christine Tan. As of July 2024, Street Signs Asia is anchored by Gill and Samantha Vadas (the later of whom replaced Will Koulouris, who before that, replaced the then-returning Teymoor Nabili). The background music for the Asian and European versions were the same as CNBC Asia's The Rundown and CNBC United States' Squawk Alley (the latter two shows no longer air as of July 2021). This version of Street Signs changed its theme music, graphics and adopted US-based titles on July 22, 2024.

This programme originally aired in a two-hour format until October 29, 2018, when it was expanded to three hours (9:00 a.m. – 12:00 p.m. SIN/HK) due to the cancellation of The Rundown.

CNBC Asia aired its final Street Signs Asia broadcast on April 4, 2025, ending its 11-year run. It was replaced on April 7 with two new shows, The China Connection and Inside India (both of those shows were abruptly cancelled due to the closure of the network's Hong Kong bureau on September 2, 2026).

=== CNBC Europe ===
CNBC Europe's version of Street Signs debuted January 4, 2016. Airing in a one-hour format from 10:00 a.m. to 11:00 a.m. CET, it replaced the first hour of Worldwide Exchange, which itself had its airtime halved to one hour, although the programme is occasionally extended to two hours on American bank holidays. The CNBC Europe version of Street Signs was originally co-anchored by Louisa Bojesen and Carolin Roth. Bojesen was previously anchor of the now-cancelled European Closing Bell and Roth, who became the solo anchor of Street Signs following Bojesen's departure from CNBC Europe on April 28, 2017, was previously co-anchor of Worldwide Exchange. Following Carolin Roth's own departure from the programme at the end of 2018, reporter and fill-in anchor Joumanna Bercetche became the permanent anchor of the programme in 2019. Julianna Tatelbaum, who also joined CNBC Europe as a correspondent and fill-in anchor in 2018, joined Bercetche as a permanent co-anchor of the programme in January 2023. Bercetche announced her departure from CNBC on-air at the end of Street Signs on February 16, 2024, making Tatelbaum the sole anchor of the programme.

Street Signs Europe was also broadcast on CNBC's United States channel on weekdays from 4:00 a.m. to 5:00 a.m. ET until it was replaced with a rebroadcast of The News with Shepard Smith on October 1, 2020. From October 12, 2020, to October 24, 2022, Street Signs Europe aired on the main United States channel only on Mondays although it continued to be carried on CNBC's United States sister channel, CNBC World, for the rest of the week (Tuesday through Friday). Occasionally, if there are major breaking news stories overnight on Tuesday through Friday, CNBC's United States channel did carry Street Signs Europe on other days, without prior notice to viewers. Following the cancellation of The News with Shepherd Smith on November 3, 2022, Street Signs Europe once again began to be shown each weekday on CNBC's United States channel from November 7, 2022.

To coincide with CNBC Europe's graphics change on September 9, 2024, Street Signs Europe debuted US-based titles and also adopted the CNBC Asia version's theme music used since the latter network's own graphics launch on July 22 of the same year.

Street Signs Europe was not broadcast on the business days between Christmas Day and New Year's Day, during which CNBC Europe's output consists only of a shortened edition of Squawk Box Europe. It was also not broadcast during the middle of March on the business days between the start of the United States' Daylight Saving Time and the United Kingdom's British Summer Time, and in mid-October during the period between the end of the UK's British Summer Time and the end of the US' Daylight Saving Time.

CNBC Europe aired its final Street Signs broadcast on April 25, 2025, ending its 9-year run. It was replaced with Europe Early Edition, which is aired from 7:00 a.m. to 8:00 a.m. CET (6:00 a.m. to 7:00 a.m. BST) before Squawk Box Europe, the latter of which now also airs the third hour of the show on CNBC's main United States channel from 4:00 a.m. to 5:00 a.m. ET, starting April 28, 2025. Europe Early Edition was abruptly cancelled on September 2, 2026.

== List of Street Signs anchors ==
=== CNBC US ===
- Maria Bartiromo (2pm ET, 1999–2002)
- Ron Insana (1996–2002 (3pm ET, 1999–2002); 2003–2006)
- Erin Burnett (2006–2011)
- Amanda Drury & Brian Sullivan (2011–2015)

=== CNBC Asia ===
- Oriel Morrison (2014–2019)
- Martin Soong (2014–2019)
- Tanvir Gill (2019–2025)
- Nancy Hungerford (2019–2021)
- Teymoor Nabili (2022–2023)
- Will Koulouris (2023–2024)
- Samantha Vadas (2024–2025)

=== CNBC Europe ===
- Louisa Bojesen (2016–2017)
- Carolin Roth (2016–2018; fill-in 2024–2025)
- Joumanna Bercetche (2019–2024)
- Julianna Tatelbaum (2023–2025)
