= The Rundown (Singaporean TV program) =

Singaporean business television program

- The Rundown intro in 2015
- Genre: Business News Program
- Presented by: Dan Murphy CNBC Asia
- Country of origin: Singapore
- Original language: English

Production
- Production location: Singapore
- Running time: 60 Minutes

Original release
- Network: CNBC Asia
- Release: 31 March 2014 – 26 October 2018

Related
- Asia Squawk Box

The Rundown is a Singaporean pre-market business news television program broadcast from the Singapore Exchange Monday through Friday on CNBC Asia. The program aired daily across the Asia Pacific from 06:00 AM to 07:00 AM in Singapore and Hong Kong. It debuted on March 31, 2014, and aired through October 26, 2018.

It was also broadcast internationally Sunday through Thursday in the United States CNBC World but only the Monday edition of the programme was seen on CNBC Europe. The program was available in more than 385 million homes worldwide.

== Overview ==
The Rundown launched on March 31, 2014. It was one of the two programs that replaced Cash Flow, with Street Signs being the other.

The program provided real-time financial market coverage and business information for the start of the Asia trading day. The program features a range of guests from top financial institutions around the world, as well as guests from CNBC's global headquarters in Englewood Cliffs, N.J., and reports from CNBC and NBC News bureaus worldwide.

== Show presenters ==
On December 24, 2015, Adam Bakhtiar left CNBC Asia, leaving Pauline Chiou as the sole presenter of The Rundown. On October 3, 2016, Correspondent Akiko Fujita replaced Chiou as anchor.

As of February 2018, correspondent Dan Murphy replaced Fujita as anchor, after the latter was appointed co-host of Asia Squawk Box, which is based in Hong Kong.

== Cancellation ==
The Rundown was cancelled on October 26, 2018. As a result, Asia Squawk Box was moved back to the 6-9am SIN/HK time slot and the Asia version of Street Signs was expanded to three hours.
