= Jeffrey James =

Australian television presenter

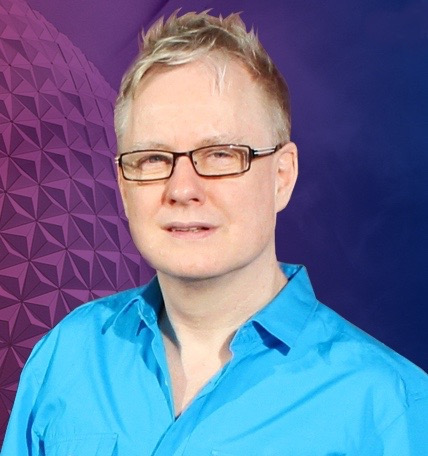
James in 2015

Jeffrey James is an Australian television news, business and current affairs anchor. During 2007 and 2008 he presented for international business news network CNBC Asia where he hosted Squawk Australia from the channel's new studio centre in Sydney. The programme was broadcast worldwide each weekday morning.

He joined German international network, Deutsche Welle (DW-TV) in 1999 where he presented business news until his departure in 2005.

James has worked with networks in Asia, Europe and Australia. At CNBC he interviewed Australian political figures including Prime Ministers John Howard and Kevin Rudd, the Minister of Communications Helen Coonan and the Deputy Prime Minister Julia Gillard.

In 1993 James produced and directed The Embraced for SBS-TV Australia.

In 1991 he created and jointly produced Pirates & The Policing of the High Seas, a docu-drama for Australia’s Beyond Television. The programme was filmed in the southern Philippines.

In 2013 James presented a video advertising feature for Thailand's Bumrungrad International Hospital.

In 2014 he presented a video advertising feature for Bumrungrad International Hospital related to re-generative medicine.

In 2017 James anchored news bulletins for Israeli global-broadcaster, i24News from Tel Aviv

== Early work ==
In 1983 Australia’s 2GB-Macquarie Radio Network chose James as one of 4 reporter-producers for its primetime episodic investigative current affairs show, Newsfront. He spent 2 years with the network. He interviewed China's representative to Hong Kong that year who provided new details of China's plans for the territory post-1997. He interviewed American Professor Robert Gallo who discovered the AIDS virus. A series on home burglary followed a break in and ended in James seeking the thieves guidance on home protection. The episode resulted in both high ratings and interest from Australian Police. His series titled Homosexuality featured interviews from one of the earliest Sydney Mardi Gras.

In 1986 James was hired by 9 Network Australia as a Segment Producer for The Midday Show and then moved in 1987 to ABC TV where he was Associate Producer on interview programme, Mike Walsh. In 1988 he moved to Hong Kong where he anchored television news for HK-TVB. He left the network after a disagreement with management over contractual issues related to hosting public events.

In 1994, James relocated to Auckland where he headed international projects as Executive Producer for Communicado. The role saw James and Communicado Chairman Neil Roberts develop co-productions with leading international broadcasters.

In 2020, James donated 100 hours of historic interviews from his Australian radio and television work to Australia's Film and Television Archive who featured his work on the museums end-of-year home page review.

== Personal life ==
Jeffrey James resides in Sydney, Australia
