= Squawk Box Asia =

- Logo from 9 February 2015 to 5 February 2016
- Presented by: Chery Kang; Martin Soong
- Original language: English

Production
- Production locations: Singapore (1998–2014, 2015, 2019–present); Hong Kong (1998–2019, 2025–present)
- Running time: 180 minutes (3 hours)

Original release
- Network: CNBC Asia
- Release: 2 February 1998 – present

Related
- See below

Squawk Box Asia (formerly Asia Squawk Box) is a television business news program on CNBC Asia, aired Monday through Friday from 7:00 a.m.-10:00 a.m. (Hong Kong/Singapore time). This programme also aires globally - on CNBC World in the United States at the respective time (8:00 p.m. - 11:00 p.m. Sunday through Thursday without daylight saving time, 7:00 p.m. - 10:00 p.m. with DST), and on CNBC Europe from 12:00 a.m.-3:00 a.m.

== Format ==
Squawk Box Asia covers the opening of the Asian markets and is presented by Sri Jegarajah in Singapore, who is generally joined by a co-presenter. There is occasionally a guest host who joins in on the second and third hour of the programme. Interviews with other analysts and C-level executives are also an essential part of the show.

During the Christmas and new year period, the show is reduced in length, airing for two hours, and is the only live programme aired by CNBC Asia over this period.

== History ==
Squawk Box Asia debuted as Asia Squawk Box in February 1998 at 8.00 Singapore time in February 1998 when CNBC Asia merged with Asia Business News and it was presented by former CNBC Asia Morning Call personalities Rico Hizon (now with BBC World) and Geoff Cutmore (the main presenter of the show's counterpart in Europe, Squawk Box Europe until 2023). Bernard Lo and Cecilia Zecha came in to eventually replace Cutmore and Hizon respectively. In October 1998, Asia Squawk Box was extended to 90 minutes and in late 1999, the show started at 7.30 SIN time. In April 2000, Asia Squawk Box moved to 7.00 SIN time. Christine Tan assumed anchoring duties in July 2000 and on 30 October 2000, the show was extended to two hours with the last half-hour being named Squawk Plus.

In July 2001, Asia Squawk Box aired for a full three hours like its US counterpart from 7 am to 10 am SIN time. Around this time, Steven Engel was added to the team as a stockwatcher. In late 2002, Bettina Chua took over as anchor as Christine Tan was reassigned to the evening hours. As a result of the cancellation of Asia Wake Up Call, ASB moved to the 6 to 9 am SIN time timeslot.

In April 2005, Martin Soong assumed the anchoring duties for the program after Chua's departure from the network.

Since 2006, the Asian version of Squawk Box has been guided editorially by Senior Producer Derrick McElheron, who also helped launch CNBC's Worldwide Exchange. As of 2006-10-30 (the same day the Asia network debuted a new graphics package similar to its US and European siblings), the show began using the titles in use by its US counterpart since late 2005, replacing the previous one that was used from 2004-2006.

=== 2007 relaunch ===
On 2007-03-26, with McElheron at the helm, Asia Squawk Box was relaunched with a new live set, replacing the virtual set it had used since its creation, and a new co-presenter in Amanda Drury. On that day, the show started using the then-current US music package and returned to the 7 to 10am timeslot and being preceded to give way to a then-new programme, Squawk Australia.

=== 2009–2014 ===
In 2009, Karen Tso took over anchoring duties from Amanda Drury, who moved back to Sydney and later to the US after the cancellation of Squawk Australia on 11 June 2010. Former Bloomberg anchor Bernard Lo re-joined the network in early 2010, based out of Hong Kong. He can now be seen regularly co-anchoring Squawk Box. Additionally, Asia Squawk Box moved back to its new/old time slot (6 am-9 am Singapore/Hong Kong Time) on 14 June 2010.

In late-2011, it was announced that Tso was moving to CNBC Europe in London. Lisa Oake re-joined the network as co-anchor of Asia Squawk Box in January 2012.

In early 2014, former Bloomberg anchor Susan Li joined CNBC Asia and replaced Lisa Oake (who left CNBC Asia at the end of 2013) as co-anchor of Asia Squawk Box.

=== 2014–2025 ===
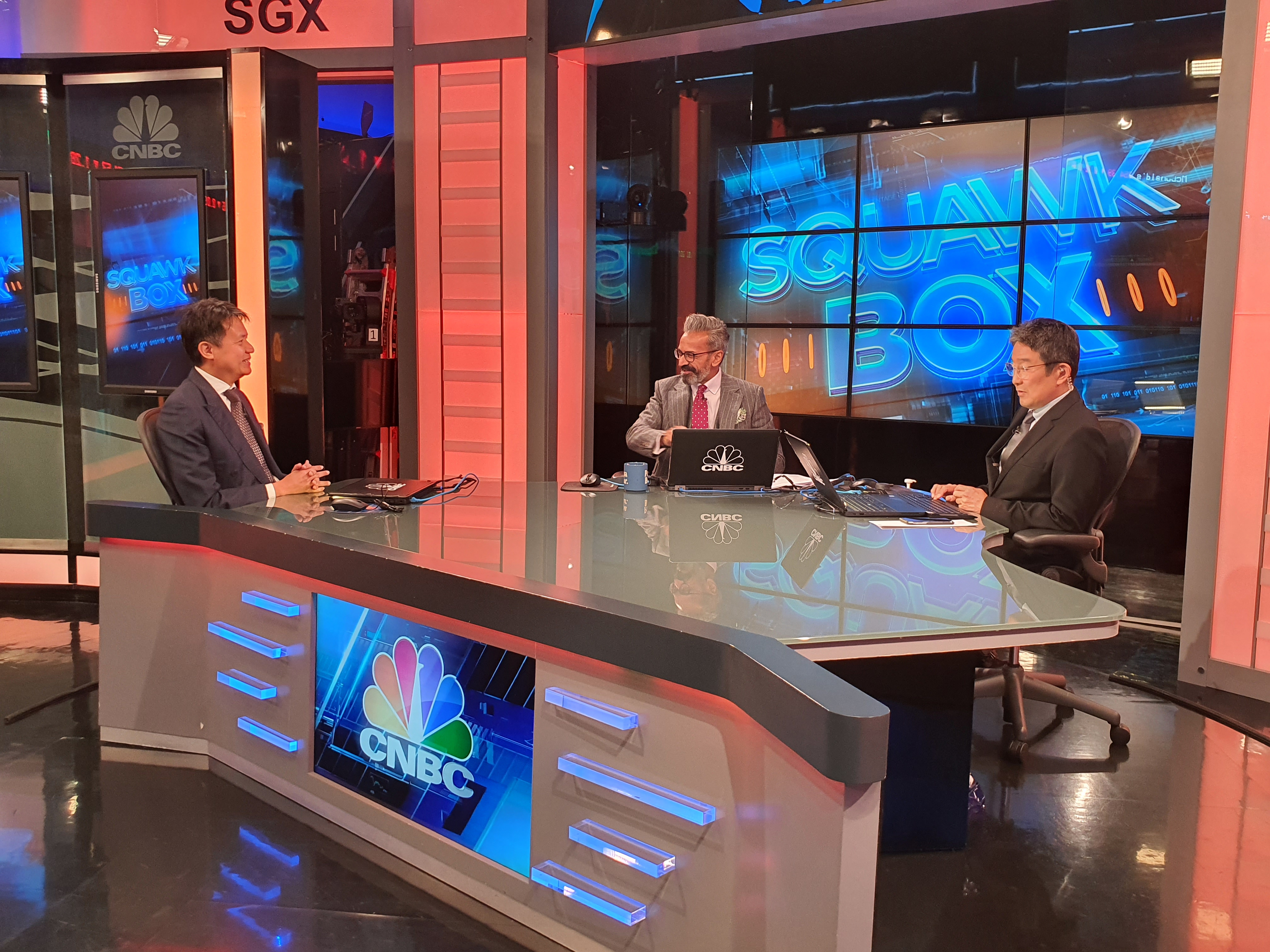
Sri Jegarajah and Martin Soong in studio (2022)

On 31 March 2014, the show launched with a new live set in Hong Kong and moved back to the 7-10 am SIN/HK timeslot. Susan Li and Bernard Lo became the new co-anchors of Asia Squawk Box, which is now based in Hong Kong. Martin Soong, who had been co-anchor from 2005–14, moved to a new program, Street Signs (which also shares the same name as its now-defunct US counterpart). That program is co-anchored by Soong and Oriel Morrison (the latter who herself had previously been anchor of Cash Flow, which was cancelled 28 March 2014).

On 9 February 2015, Asia Squawk Box debuted a new logo that is used by its US counterpart since 13 October 2014, but the theme music was originally not the same as its US and Europe versions. That changed 27 April 2015, when the Asia version started using the same theme music as its US and Europe versions.

In mid-August 2015, the show briefly launched again in the Singapore Exchange studio after Susan Li left CNBC Asia to join its sister network in Europe as co-anchor of Worldwide Exchange. On 26 October 2015, Lo became the sole anchor of Asia Squawk Box, which is once again based in Hong Kong.

On 8 February 2016, both the Asian and European versions started using the remastered Squawk Box logo that has been used by their US counterpart since 4 January 2016.

On 3 July 2017, Singapore-based anchor Oriel Morrison joined Asia Squawk Box as co-anchor of the show's third hour.

In February 2018, Akiko Fujita (formerly of The Rundown, which was based in Singapore) joined Lo in Hong Kong as co-anchor.

On 29 October 2018, Asia Squawk Box once again moved back to the previous 6-9 am SIN/HK timeslot following the cancellation of The Rundown three days prior.

In February 2019, Nancy Hungerford (formerly of Capital Connection) replaced the departed Akiko Fujita as co-anchor.

On 2 December 2019, Sri Jegarajah and Martin Soong became the new anchor team for Asia Squawk Box, which also marked the latter's return to the show as co-anchor, a role in which he previously served from 2005-2014. Soong had previously co-anchored the Asian version of Street Signs since its 31 March 2014 debut following his first stint as anchor of Asia Squawk Box.

To coincide with the launch of CNBC Asia's new graphics on 22 July 2024, Asia Squawk Box adopted the US variant of the program logo used since 11 December 2023 along with the US show's theme music used since late October 2019.

=== 2025–present ===
On 7 April 2025, the show's title was changed from Asia Squawk Box to Squawk Box Asia and moved back to its 7-10am SIN/HK timeslot. Chery Kang, who had previously been CNBC Asia's Hong Kong-based correspondent, replaced Jegarajah as co-anchor but remained in Hong Kong. Soong, the show's other co-anchor, remained in Singapore. Jegarajah returned to the programme in early 2026.

In August 2026, CNBC Asia reduced its live programming to co-inside with the closure of its office and bureau in Hong Kong. Consequently the show is now hosted from Singapore, with Amanda Drury is doing some co-hosting duties from Sydney.

== Facts ==
- Maria Bartiromo, who was part of the original US Squawk Box team until the mid-2000s, was a guest co-anchor on ASB in 2006. She was also a regular on ASB from late 2000 to early 2002 when the U.S. reverts to standard time from daylight saving time (late-October to March of the following year) to recap the US trading day. At other times of the year, she appeared on the now canceled CNBC Today and Asia Wake Up Call. Bartiromo left CNBC at the end of November 2013.

== Anchors ==
- Rico Hizon (1998)
- Andrew Stevens (1998)
- Cecilia Zecha (1998–2000)
- Bernard Lo (1998-2004, 2010–2019)
- Christine Tan (2000–2002)
- Bettina Chua (2002–2005)
- Martin Soong (2005–2014, 2019–present)
- Amanda Drury (2007–2010), occasionally acts as relief anchor from Sydney
- Karen Tso (2010–2011)
- Lisa Oake (2012–2014)
- Susan Li (2014–2015)
- Oriel Morrison (2015–2019), relief anchor from Singapore; also anchored the third hour of the show
- Geoff Cutmore (2015), occasional relief anchor from Hong Kong
- Akiko Fujita (2018–2019)
- Nancy Hungerford (2019)
- Sri Jegarajah (2019–2025, 2026-present)
- Chery Kang (2025–2026), based in Hong Kong

== See also ==
- Squawk Box
- Squawk Box Europe
- Squawk Australia
