= Seema Mody =

American television personality

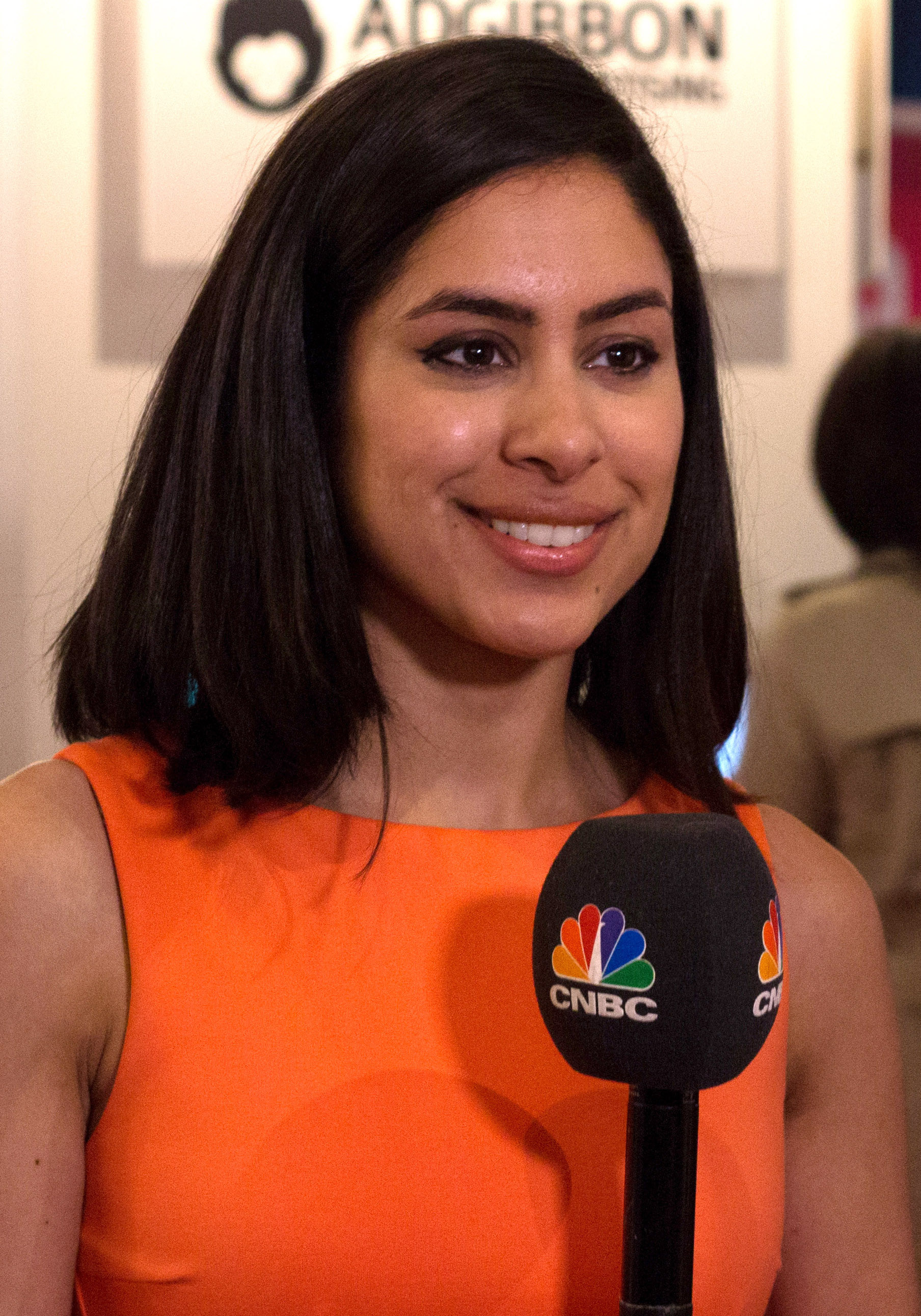
- Mody reporting from TNW Conference, 2015
- Education: University of Washington (BA)
- Occupation: Television news anchor/reporter
- Spouse: Married

Seema Mody is a reporter and anchor for CNBC. She joined CNBC in July 2011 after previously being one at CNBC-TV18 in Mumbai, India. While airing on CNBC-TV18, Mody co-anchored two programs, Power Breakfast and After the Bell, as well as co-producing and anchoring other special features. She is currently the global markets reporter for CNBC with a focus on foreign policy and Wall Street. She hosts the "European Close" which discusses complex topics across Europe for U.S. investors. She also covers travel industry including hotels, cruises and online travel operators.

== Biography ==
Mody graduated from Valley Catholic School in Beaverton, Oregon. After high school, she attended the University of Washington, receiving a bachelor's degree in biological sciences. Previously, Mody regularly reported on several CNBC shows including Street Signs, Closing Bell and The Kudlow Report - focusing on the biotechnology and pharmaceutical fields. She is also CNBC's first Indian American on-air news personality.

From September 15, 2014, to September 4, 2015, Mody was an anchor for London-based CNBC Europe, where she was a co-anchor of Worldwide Exchange. Mody is a member of the Council on Foreign Relations.

In September 2015, Mody left CNBC Europe and rejoined CNBC US and serves as the channel's global markets reporter, presenting the round-up of the closure of the European stock markets. She also covers the travel industry and presents Futures Now for CNBC Digital.

== See also ==
- Indian Americans in New York City
- New Yorkers in journalism
