= Brian Shactman =

American journalist

Brian A. Shactman
- Education: B.A. Amherst College; M.A. Clark University
- Occupation: Television journalist
- Notable credit(s): ESPN; WVIT (2002-2006); CNBC (2006-present)
- Spouse: Jessica Matzkin Shactman
- Parent(s): Nancy and David Shactman

Brian A. Shactman is an American journalist for CNBC and MSNBC.

== Biography ==
Shactman grew up in Swampscott, Massachusetts, the son of Nancy and David Shactman. He graduated from Phillips Exeter Academy and earned a B.A. in English and History from Amherst College in 1994. He also has a Master of Arts degree in English from Clark University in Worcester, Massachusetts.

After school, he worked as a member of the faculty at Taft School in Watertown, Connecticut and then worked for ESPN as a journalist at ESPNEWS, SportsCenter and ESPN Radio. In 2002, he joined Hartford NBC-affiliate WVIT (owned and operated by General Electric, the parent company of CNBC). In June 2007, he joined CNBC as a general assignment reporter and substitute anchor for CNBC's Business Day programmes. In October 2007, he became the co-anchor on Worldwide Exchange with CNBC Europe's Ross Westgate in London and CNBC Asia's Christine Tan in Singapore. In May 2013, he began anchoring Way Too Early on MSNBC; and eventually returned to New England to work for NECN and NBC Boston.

Shactman received three regional Emmy Awards nominations in 2002 for his sports anchoring and reporting. A year later (2003), he won The Associated Press Award for a documentary on University of Connecticut women's head basketball coach Geno Auriemma. Shactman is also involved in community service, volunteering for Junior Achievement, ALS, and Connecticut's mentoring program. He has also served on the Board of Directors for Special Olympics. He also won Best Radio Show in Connecticut in 2024 for his radio show from Talk 1080 WTIC called "Brain & Company."

He is married to Jessica Matzkin Shactman. He also has three children: Annie (2006), Max (2007), and Bennett (2009).
