= Boss Bitch (disambiguation) =

"Boss Bitch" is a 2020 song by Doja Cat from Birds of Prey: The Album.

Boss Bitch may also refer to:

- Boss Bitch, book by Nicole Lapin
- "Boss Bitch", song on Lil Baby's 2018 album Harder Than Ever
- "Boss Bitch", a 2019 song by Dutch singer Famke Louise
- "Boss Bitch", a 2019 song by Brooke Candy featuring Ashnikko from the album Sexorcism

== See also ==
- Boss Bitch's World and Boss Bitch's World 2, mixtapes by LoLa Monroe
