= Nicole Lapin =

American television news anchor, author and businesswoman

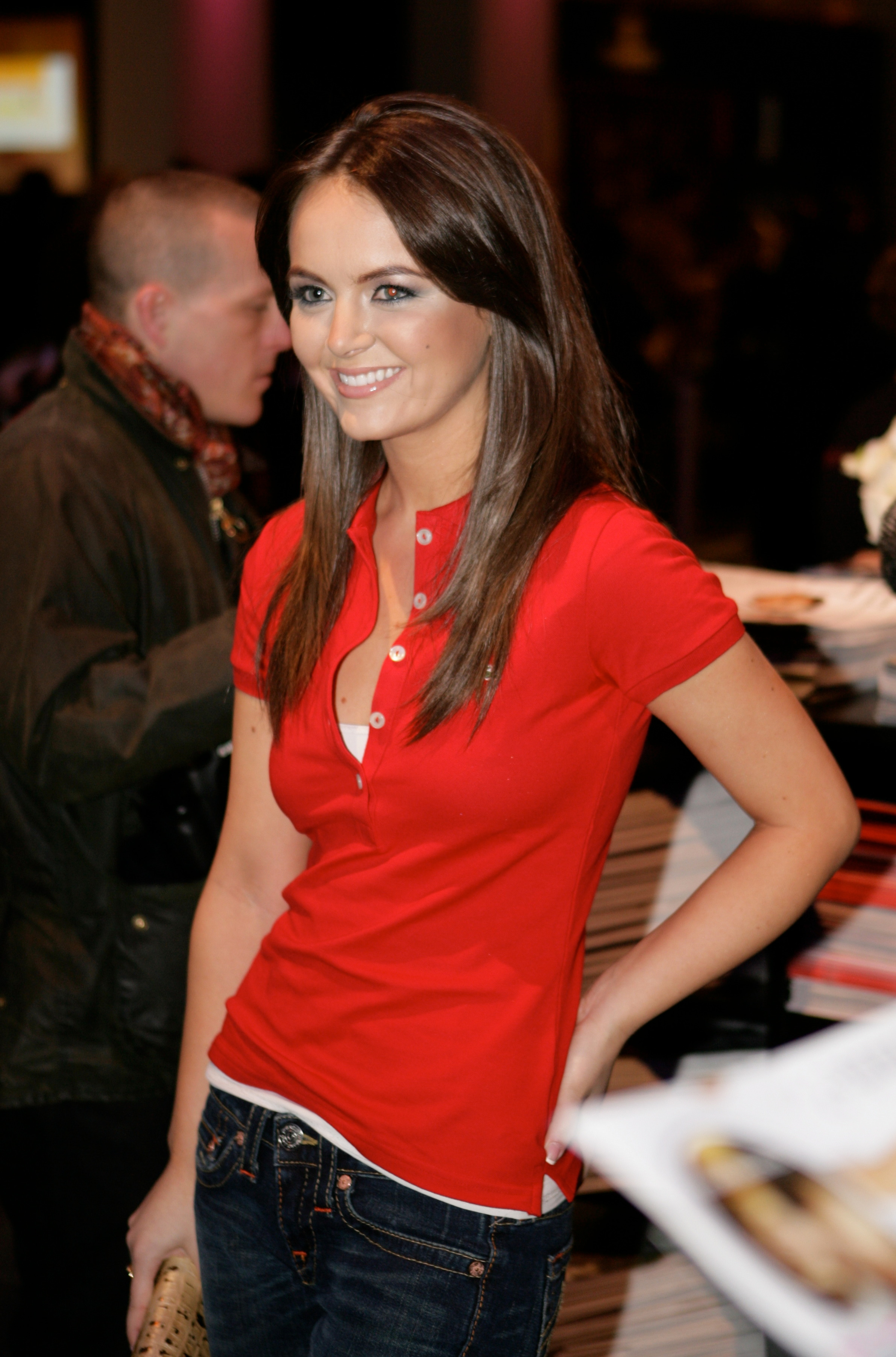
- Lapin in 2007
- Born: March 7, 1984 (age 42); Los Angeles, California, US
- Education: Medill School of Journalism, Northwestern University
- Occupations: News anchor, author, businesswoman
- Agent(s): Washington Speakers Bureau, WME
- Notable credit(s): CNN anchor (May 2005 – January 2010); CNBC anchor (2010–2012); Bloomberg anchor (2012); Wendy Williams correspondent (2012–present); Hatched host on The CW (2015–present)
- Website: www.nicolelapin.com

Nicole Lapin (born March 7, 1984) is an American television news anchor, author, and businesswoman. She has worked as a news anchor on CNBC, CNN and Bloomberg. Lapin also served as a finance correspondent for Morning Joe on MSNBC and contributed to The Today Show on NBC.

She is the author of Rich Bitch, Boss Bitch and Becoming Super Woman, which appeared on The New York Times Best Seller list. Her fourth book, Miss Independent, was released in 2022 and debuted on The Wall Street Journal bestseller list in the "Hardcover Business" category.

Lapin co-hosted the business competition show Hatched with Carter Reum on The CW Network, which aired on Saturday mornings for two seasons. She has also appeared on programs including Good Morning America, CNN, Entertainment Tonight, The Kelly Clarkson Show, The Tamron Hall Show, and The Drew Barrymore Show.

== Early life and education ==
Lapin was born and raised in Los Angeles, California, to a scientist and a beauty queen, both of Jewish descent. Her interest in journalism developed while watching CNN's coverage of the Gulf War, an activity her parents initially restricted because of what they viewed as negativity and violence. While in high school, Lapin worked as a news anchor for a public-access television cable station. At 15, she took part in writing programs at Harvard.

Lapin graduated as the valedictorian of her class from the Medill School of Journalism at Northwestern University, where she also majored in political science. She has been described as one of the youngest in her graduating class. She also studied European Union politics at L'Institut d'études politiques de Paris.

== Career ==
Lapin began her career as a correspondent at CBS stations in South Dakota and Kentucky. She also worked as an investigative "I-Team" reporter for KPSP-LP in Palm Springs, California. While at that station she reported live from San Quentin Prison during the execution of Stanley Williams. Lapin also reported from the floor of the Chicago Mercantile Exchange for the First Business network in Chicago.

She joined CNN in 2005 and was among the younger anchors at the network at that time. At CNN she anchored coverage of events such as the Virginia Tech massacre, the Israel–Hezbollah conflict, and the 2008 presidential election. In 2009, Lapin reported on location in Los Angeles during Michael Jackson's memorial service. She conducted interviews including a one-on-one with Governor Arnold Schwarzenegger during California's budget crisis. She was among the anchors involved in the launch of CNN Live, and regularly appeared on CNN Headline News, CNN, and CNN International.

Lapin joined CNBC in January 2010 as a New York–based anchor on Worldwide Exchange, working alongside CNBC Europe's Ross Westgate and CNBC Asia's Christine Tan. In June 2010, she added co-anchoring duties on The Kudlow Report from 7–8 p.m. EST. At CNBC she interviewed corporate executives and covered market movements, including initial public offerings and pre-market activity. Lapin anchored from Washington, D.C., during the 2011 U.S. budget discussions and produced reporting on state fiscal issues. She produced a series on state fiscal challenges titled "States of Pain" and reported on topics such as domestic manufacturing trends. She contributed a regular column on CNBC.com and wrote about alternative investments that appeared in other outlets, including USA Today.

While contributing to NBC, Lapin reported on personal finance for Today and provided a daily business update on Morning Joe and MSNBC. She also contributed business segments to NBC affiliates including KNBC and WNBC, and produced business reports for The Golf Channel's "Morning Drive" program.

In September 2012, Lapin joined Bloomberg Television as an anchor and special correspondent. At Bloomberg she anchored "Bloomberg West" and covered technology and business topics, interviewing leaders from companies such as LinkedIn and Zappos. She also covered technology applications in sports.

In 2013, Lapin was named a special correspondent focusing on the business of entertainment for omg! Insider and Entertainment Tonight and served as a money-saving correspondent for The Wendy Williams Show.

Lapin founded a production company that created the financial news site Recessionista, which was adapted as a show on Ora TV. She announced an AOL Originals series titled I'll Never Forget My First, which she hosted and executive produced. Her company also launched a wearable product, CASH Smartwatch, marketed with retail partner HSN.

In 2014, Harlequin (now HarperCollins) announced plans to publish Lapin's book Rich Bitch. The book appeared on The New York Times Bestseller list. Lapin later signed a book deal with Crown Business for Boss Bitch and published additional titles including Becoming Super Woman. In October 2020, she signed a multi-book deal with HarperCollins Leadership. Redbook magazine named Lapin their money columnist in 2015.

Also in 2015, she was the host and a judge on Hatched, a business competition show on The CW Network. The show was renewed for a second season in 2016 on CBS. In 2017, Lapin was a judge on the Miss America 2017 pageant. In 2018, she launched online masterclasses titled "The Money School" and "The Boss School". On "The Boss School" podcast, she interviewed business leaders and founders. In 2019, she was appointed a faculty member at the Jack Welch School of Business at Strayer University.

In 2022, she launched Money News Network (MNN), a podcast network focused on business and finance. She hosts the daily program "Money Rehab with Nicole Lapin" and co-hosts "Help Wanted" with Entrepreneur editor-in-chief Jason Feifer. By 2026, MNN produced 15 podcasts, including Mo News, Social Currency, and Superwomen, and had a partnership with Entrepreneur Media involving several of that company's shows. MNN also operates The Money School, a financial education platform, and Private Wealth Collective, a registered investment adviser. According to Lapin, the company has no outside investors.

In 2023, she received recognition from the Webby Awards for podcasting categories.

She has contributed financial reports and segments to Rachael Ray, The Kelly Clarkson Show, The Doctors and Access Hollywood. Lapin has served as a regular money expert on programs including GMA3 and E! Daily Pop and has contributed to outlets such as Forbes, Entrepreneur, and Thrive Online. The shows on her network MNN include: "Money Rehab with Nicole Lapin", "Help Wanted with Jason Feifer and Nicole Lapin", "We Have Options with Dominque Broadway", and "Money Maker with Nely Galán / Mi Mundo Rico con Nely Galán".

== Philanthropy ==
Lapin has been involved with several charitable organisations. She served as an ambassador for the Starlight Starbright Children's Foundation and created a chat series called "Being Smart is Cool" intended to educate seriously ill children about global issues. She has also served as an ambassador for Points of Light and launched a birthday campaign associated with the United Nations' "Girl Up" initiative.

She has been listed as a "smile ambassador" alongside Jessica Simpson for Operation Smile. She is associated with the advisory board of Step Up and has served on the board of Women in Need.

== Personal life ==
Lapin has appeared on the cover of PowerGirls Magazine and Eliza magazine. In 2008, she received the "Power 30 under 30" award. She was a judge for the Tribeca Film Festival in 2011 and for Miss America in 2016.

In 2020, Lapin spoke publicly about experiencing a miscarriage and started a petition for companies to adopt miscarriage leave policies. She also interviewed Senator Tammy Duckworth about proposed legislation to allow time off after pregnancy loss.

She has previously been reported to have dated Twitter founder Jack Dorsey and to have lived with businessman Michael G. Rubin for four years.

Lapin is married and has one child. In December 2024, Lapin gave birth to a daughter. Three weeks later in January 2025, she evacuated with her newborn during the January 2025 Los Angeles wildfires. The Palisades Fire destroyed her home in Pacific Palisades and the office she had built for Money News Network. Lapin said the loss revived a fear of housing insecurity dating to her childhood, when her family's home was foreclosed on. By September 2025, she had relocated and rebuilt the network's studio.

== Bibliography ==
- 2016 – Rich Bitch: A Simple 12-Step Plan for Getting Your Financial Life Together...Finally
- 2017 – Boss Bitch: A Simple 12-Step Plan to Take Charge of Your Career
- 2019 – Becoming Super Woman
- 2019 – The Super Woman Journal
- 2022 – Miss Independent: A Simple 12-Step Plan to Start Investing and Grow Your Own Wealth
- 2025 – The Money School: A Simple 12-Step Plan to Master Financial Markets and Start Investing

== See also ==
- New Yorkers in journalism
