= Worldwide Exchange =

CNBC Program

- Logo of Worldwide Exchange (2015–2023)
- Also known as: Worldwide Exchange (2005-2026); Morning Call (2026-)
- Genre: business news program
- Presented by: Morgan Brennan
- Country of origin: United States
- Original language: English

Production
- Production locations: London, England (2005–2015); Englewood Cliffs, New Jersey (2005–2012, 2016-present); Singapore (2005–2012)
- Running time: 60 minutes

Original release
- Network: CNBC Europe (2005–2015); CNBC (2016–present)
- Release: December 19, 2005 – present

Related
- (details here)

Worldwide Exchange was a television business news program on CNBC channels around the world. It used to be broadcast live from studios on three continents until May 11, 2012, and was produced by CNBC Europe in London. From the start of 2016 until its demise a decade later, it was produced at CNBC Global Headquarters in Englewood Cliffs, New Jersey.

Originally billed as "the first ever global business news broadcast", Worldwide Exchange began broadcasting in December 2005, and was the first CNBC program to be jointly produced by three of the network's regional channels. As a result of the success of Worldwide Exchange, a second joint production, Capital Connection, debuted on CNBC Europe and CNBC Asia on March 26, 2007.

Worldwide Exchange replaced Wake Up Call, an early morning pre-market program on CNBC US that ran from 2002 to 2005; Morning Exchange, a mid-morning program on CNBC Europe; as well as Asia Market Wrap and CNBC Tonight on CNBC Asia, a daily wrap-up of the top business news in Asia.

On October 13, 2014, Worldwide Exchange was switched to a full 16:9 letterbox presentation and re-launched in 1080i high-definition on CNBC US.

== Format ==
=== Original format (December 19, 2005 – March 11, 2011) ===
The original program format began with the three anchors, Christine Tan from Asia, Ross Westgate from Europe, and Michelle Caruso-Cabrera from the United States, respectively, along with the headlines from each continent. A round-up of trading in Europe and Asia followed (normally including a look at the FTSE CNBC Global 300 Index, which was launched on the show on September 18, 2006), along with a look at US stock futures. The top business stories in each continent were then narrated in turn. Caruso-Cabrera was an anchor on Wake Up Call, a program that Worldwide Exchange replaced in 2005.

The first half-hour also featured the program's signature segment, the fast-paced "Global Stock Watch". Breaking news on European economic data was frequently covered 30 minutes into the show, and was followed by instant analysis with a guest. The remainder of the original program format consisted largely of a mix of business headlines (which were then repeated in the second hour), interviews with guests, and issue-specific dispatches from CNBC reporters. Caruso-Cabrera left on October 19, 2007, and was replaced by Brian Shactman until at the end of 2009. The following year, on February 1, 2010, Nicole Lapin became the U.S. presenter until her departure from the network on August 5, 2011.

From its premiere until March 25, 2011, Worldwide Exchange featured guest hosts during both hours of the show.

Two regular segments which appeared towards the end of the broadcast were a preview of Squawk Box, (which immediately follows Worldwide Exchange in the US and Asia), and the "US Lookahead." At the end of the broadcast, before the three anchors signed off, the US anchor took a final look at US stock futures if time permitted.

=== Second format (March 28, 2011 – May 11, 2012) ===
On March 28, 2011, Worldwide Exchange underwent a major overhaul. The first 50 minutes of the program were initially broadcast from Asia and Europe, with the US leg of the show starting at 50 minutes past the first hour. The three anchors were together for just 20 minutes, from :50 past the first hour to :10 past the second hour. Also, the Asian leg of Worldwide Exchange was no longer featured after :10 past the second hour, to which the show was broadcast only from Europe and the United States from that point forward.

Additionally, during this period, the second hour of Worldwide Exchange was not broadcast on CNBC Asia. Following Lapin's departure from the network, Jackie DeAngelis (who was previously a correspondent in CNBC's Bahrain studios) became the US presenter until May 11, 2012 (see below).

=== Third format (May 14, 2012 – December 31, 2015) ===
Worldwide Exchange underwent an overhaul on May 14, 2012, with the addition of Kelly Evans as co-anchor. In another major tweak, the show was then broadcast entirely from Europe. At that point, there were no longer Asian and U.S. anchors, due in part to Tan's and DeAngelis' departures from the show, leaving Ross Westgate as the last original anchor. The program later launched new titles and reduced to a single location with the program being solely presented from London.

Ross Westgate became the sole anchor of Worldwide Exchange on May 7, 2013, after Kelly Evans' departure from CNBC Europe's London headquarters, due to her reassignment back to the United States and her then-new anchoring duties on Squawk on the Street. On June 6, 2014, Westgate himself left the program, as well as CNBC Europe, and was replaced by Julia Chatterley. Newly hired anchor Wilfred Frost (son of David Frost) joined as co-anchor on September 1, 2014, and Seema Mody (formerly of CNBC TV18 and CNBC US) joined the program on September 15 (later to leave during September 2015 when she returned to CNBC's US headquarters). In June 2015, Carolin Roth (previously CNBC Europe's Zürich correspondent and Europe anchor of Capital Connection) joined the program. She replaced Julia Chatterley (who then returned to her previous role as a correspondent) and became a permanent co-anchor. On September 4, 2015, as previously mentioned, Mody left Worldwide Exchange to rejoin CNBC US and less than a week later, on September 10, Susan Li, previously a co-anchor of Asia Squawk Box on sister network CNBC Asia, joined the program in the same capacity.

The last two-hour edition of Worldwide Exchange aired on December 24, 2015, and was reduced to one-hour beginning the week of December 28. The final CNBC Europe-produced show from London aired on December 31, 2015.

=== Fourth format (January 4, 2016 – March 20, 2026) ===
Beginning on January 4, 2016, Worldwide Exchange is produced and presented from the United States and now primarily acts as an early morning show for the American audience rather than as a global business programme. Sara Eisen (currently co-anchor of CNBC US' Squawk on the Street) joined incumbent anchor Frost as the new anchor team for the new hour-long show and now airs weekdays from 5:00 a.m. to 6:00 a.m. ET on the main CNBC channel and CNBC World in the United States, 11:00 a.m. to noon CET on CNBC Europe, and 5:00 p.m. to 6:00 p.m. (with DST) or 6:00 p.m. to 7:00 p.m. (without DST) Hong Kong/Singapore/Taiwan Time on CNBC Asia except Friday until April 24, 2020.

On March 12, 2018, Brian Sullivan (former co-anchor of Power Lunch), replaced Wilfred Frost and Sara Eisen as anchor of Worldwide Exchange. Eisen, in turn, replaced Sullivan on Power Lunch, while Frost moved to Closing Bell to co-anchor alongside Kelly Evans (herself a former co-anchor of Worldwide Exchange); both Eisen and Frost co-anchored Closing Bell from November 29, 2018, until the latter's departure from CNBC on February 16, 2022.

On February 21, 2023, Frank Holland replaced Brian Sullivan as anchor of Worldwide Exchange. Holland was replaced with Morgan Brennan on January 20, 2026.

=== Fifth format (March 23, 2026 - present) ===
On March 23, 2026, the show was renamed Morning Call, with non-USA coverage restricted to single start-of-show reports from Europe and Asia. The European report is provided by one of the Squawk Box Europe presenters and the Asian segment is presented by Dan Murphy.

=== Graphics ===
Then-program producer CNBC Europe developed a new graphic style for the launch of the show on December 19, 2005, similar to that introduced across CNBC US on the same date. These graphics were initially used only on Worldwide Exchange, before being rolled out to all other CNBC Europe programs on September 18, 2006, and were used through January 4, 2008. The previous lower thirds, which were first used across CNBC US on December 19, 2006, were used on Worldwide Exchange (and all other CNBC Europe programs) from January 7, 2008 to July 24, 2009.

The programme's previous graphics package, which included a new intertitle and a new voiceover introduction (but retaining the lower thirds from July 28, 2009, to February 26, 2010), debuted December 14, 2009. The graphics package for this and all of the other CNBC Europe programmes, including the new lower thirds, debuted March 1, 2010, to May 11, 2012. This new graphic style also debuted on CNBC US that same day.

Started from May 14, 2012, CNBC Europe developed a new graphic style of the show until March 6, 2015.

On October 13, 2014, the CNBC regional tickers on this show switched from a Klavika typeface font to a Gotham typeface font, with the on-screen bug being moved to the lower right of the screen.

Worldwide Exchange launched new titles - including the programme's new logo (which replaced variations of the original that were used since its December 19, 2005, debut) - as well as new theme music (which is the same as CNBC US' Options Action) and a new graphic style based on the US network's version on March 9, 2015. CNBC Europe itself (which originally produced Worldwide Exchange as previously mentioned) debuted the new graphics for this and all of that network's other programmes on the same day.

The graphics were changed slightly on January 4, 2016, when CNBC US took over production, coinciding with the show's relocation to the network's Global Headquarters in Englewood Cliffs, New Jersey. The colour changed from green-blue to orange-blue (the same as the original Squawk Box logo).

On December 11, 2023, Worldwide Exchange was the first show to feature CNBC US' current graphics package, which launched on the same day.

==== Tickers ====
The respective regional tickers are retained in each of the channels during the broadcast, except for CNBC World, which features the CNBC Europe ticker to show that the programme is produced by the said network. CNBC HD (formerly CNBC HD+) used to show the CNBC Europe ticker until August 8, 2011.

== Notable personalities ==
=== Previous anchors ===
- Ross Westgate (2005–2014)
- Michelle Caruso-Cabrera (2005–2007), later chief international correspondent for CNBC U.S.
- Christine Tan (2005–2012), now presents Managing Asia
- Brian Shactman (2007–2009), was most recently with WBTS-CD (NBC 10 Boston)
- Nicole Lapin (February 1, 2010 – August 5, 2011)
- Kelly Evans (2012–2013), now hosts The Exchange and co-anchors Power Lunch on CNBC US
- Seema Mody (2014–2015), rejoined CNBC US in September 2015
- Susan Li (September–December 2015), now with Fox Business Network
- Julia Chatterley (2014–2015), now with CNN International
- Wilfred Frost (2014–2018), no longer with CNBC as of February 16, 2022, and now with UK-based Sky News
- Sara Eisen (2016–2018), now co-anchor of Squawk on the Street
- Brian Sullivan (2018–2023), returned to Power Lunch as co-anchor on December 23, 2024
- Frank Holland (2023-2026), now anchor of U.S. Markets Edition, which is aired Monday through Thursday on CNBC Asia

== Market holidays ==
On European bank holidays, CNBC Asia sometimes produced the programme, for example on December 26, 2007, March 24, 2008 and April 6, 2010. On April 9, 2012, CNBC Asia produced the first hour of Worldwide Exchange, with the second hour produced by CNBC US. Alternatively, the show is simply not aired (as is the case on Christmas Day, New Year's Day and Good Friday).

When the US markets were closed for a holiday while the Asian and European markets are open, Worldwide Exchange was originally broadcast live from Asia and Europe (similar to Capital Connection), but was still relayed live on CNBC's US channel albeit without US presenters. During some Asian holiday periods (such as May 1), no Asian presenters were featured, although it can still be seen in the region. That practice was discontinued as a result of the aforementioned format change on May 14, 2012, the exceptions are for Easter and Boxing Day, when the London studios are closed for the holiday, correspondents from the US team presented the program and was produced by CNBC US.

Also in 2012, Worldwide Exchange began being extended for an hour on US market holidays to provide an additional hour of live European market coverage. This extra hour did not air on CNBC US although the third hour was shown on sister US channel CNBC World. As of 2014, the third hour was no longer aired on US market holidays.

As of January 4, 2016, when production of Worldwide Exchange was relocated from the London studios to the network's main US studios in Englewood Cliffs, New Jersey, the program stopped being aired on US market holidays.

== See also ==
- Asia Market Wrap
- Morning Exchange
- Wake Up Call
- Capital Connection (a CNBC Asia-produced program anchored from Singapore, which follows a similar format)
