= Dylan Ratigan =

American businessman, former MSNBC host

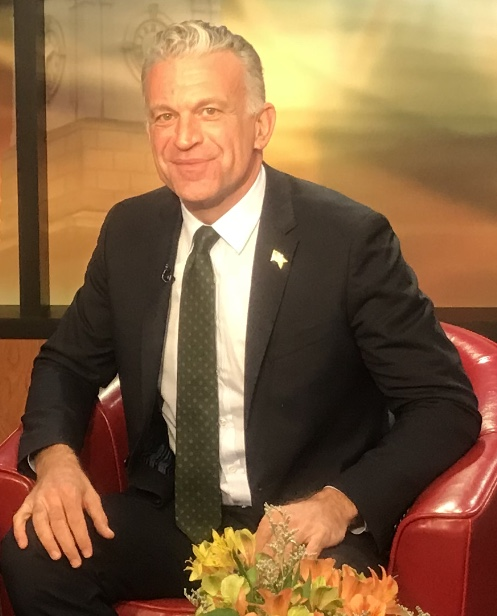
- Born: Dylan Jason Ratigan; April 19, 1972 (age 54); Saranac Lake, New York, U.S.
- Education: Union College, Schenectady (BA)
- Occupations: Founder, Helical Holdings
- Notable credit: Host of MSNBC's The Dylan Ratigan Show
- Political party: Democratic
- Website: Official website

Dylan Jason Ratigan (born April 19, 1972) is an American businessman, author, film producer, former host of MSNBC's The Dylan Ratigan Show and political commentator for The Young Turks. He was a candidate for the U.S. House of Representatives in New York's 21st Congressional District.

Ratigan was formerly Global Managing Editor for Corporate Finance at Bloomberg News. Ratigan has developed and launched CNBC's Fast Money and Closing Bell, as well as DylanRatigan.com, which hosts his podcast, Greedy Bastards Antidote.

From 2009 to 2012, Ratigan hosted The Dylan Ratigan Show, the highest-rated non-prime time show on MSNBC, aimed at critiquing what Ratigan described as an unholy alliance between big business and government.

His first book, Greedy Bastards, was released in 2012, and spent five consecutive weeks on The New York Times Best Sellers List.

In 2017, he joined The Young Turks as a political commentator. From 2011 to 2017, he was a contributor to HuffPost.

In 2018, Ratigan was a candidate for the Democratic nomination for the United States House of Representatives in New York's 21st congressional district, which he lost to Tedra Cobb.

== Early life ==
Ratigan was born in the village of Saranac Lake, in upstate New York, the son of Adrienne (née Dodge), a psychotherapist, and John Ratigan. His grandfather, Frank Ratigan, was mayor of Saranac Lake from 1957 to 1961.

Ratigan is of Irish (father), Hungarian Jewish (maternal grandfather) and Italian (maternal grandmother) descent. He was raised by his single mother. He earned a Bachelor of Arts degree in political economy from Union College of Union University in Schenectady, where he was a member of the crew team.

== Journalism career ==
Ratigan was the Global Managing Editor for Corporate Finance at Bloomberg News Service, and before that had covered Mergers and Acquisitions, the U.S. Stock Market and IPOs. At Bloomberg, he co-created and hosted Morning Call for Bloomberg's cable network and the USA Network. He was a contributor to ABC News and his articles have appeared in The New York Times, The Washington Post, The Miami Herald and Chicago Tribune.

Ratigan was the host of Fast Money (co-created with Susan Krakower and launching on June 21, 2006). Previously, he was the first anchor of CNBC's On the Money. He also anchored the CNBC TV program Bullseye for about a year and a half. In addition to his former duties as co-anchor on Closing Bell, Ratigan was a rotating co-anchor of The Call.

Ratigan left as host of Fast Money in 2009, provoked by outrage over the government's handling of the 2008 financial crisis. Since then, he has dedicated his work to launching platforms that engage and debate the U.S. government on policy, while opening the door for millions to learn more about money's often poisonous role in democracy. The New York Times reported he was considering all options but quoted him as saying he was dedicated to covering the economy, "the story that is affecting every American in every setting."

Morning Meeting launched June 29, 2009. Ratigan also contributes to other NBC News programs. Ratigan described the show's imperative as "to discuss any and all political issues with no directive other than to provide compelling content." The show was the second ever on the network to air in HD, as the network launched their programming in that format.

On May 27, 2010, Ratigan appeared as a guest host on the daily internet news and opinion show, The Young Turks. Cenk Uygur, regular host of The Young Turks was a frequent guest on The Dylan Ratigan Show.

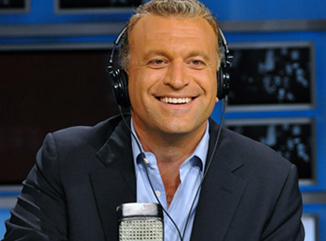
Ratigan at MSNBC

On January 9, 2012, he appeared as a guest on The Rachel Maddow Show on MSNBC, discussing the premise of his book, Greedy Bastards, viz. the swindling and robbing of America by "government corruption and corporate communism, incensed by banksters shaking down taxpayers, and despairing of an ailing health care system, an age-old dependency on foreign oil, and a failing educational system".

The final episode of The Dylan Ratigan Show was on June 22, 2012.

In 2008, Ratigan appeared on The Oprah Winfrey Show to discuss the 2008 financial crisis. In 2010, he appeared on The Colbert Report with Stephen Colbert and Late Night with Conan O'Brien.

=== Reporting ===
Ratigan won the Gerald Loeb Award for 2004 coverage of the Enron scandal.

In Ratigan's final CNBC broadcast from the floor of the NYSE he reported on what he called "an important story developing" that Goldman Sachs and "a variety of European banks," in his assessment and that of his guests, essentially "perpetrated securities fraud" and an "insurance fraud scam" against AIG — and, by extension, the government and taxpayers funding that insurance company's "bailout" — by insuring their questionable investment vehicles and, upon their devaluation, making claims on them to be paid by AIG "at 100 cents on the dollar" despite all of the markdowns "being forced upon every other" entity including the government, banks, shareholders, bond holders, taxpayers and homeowners.

=== 2011 speech ===
On the August 10, 2011, broadcast of The Dylan Ratigan Show, in a round table discussion of a sharp stock market drop following the Budget Control Act of 2011, Ratigan made a two-minute-long speech against what he perceived to be the state of politics in the United States government, saying:

"We've got a real problem! ... This is a mathematical fact! Tens of trillions of dollars are being extracted from the United States of America. Democrats aren't doing it, Republicans aren't doing it. An entire integrated system, financial system, trading system, taxing system, that was created by both parties over a period of two decades is at work on our entire country right now. And we're sitting here arguing about whether we should do the $4 trillion plan that kicks the can down the road for the president for 2017, or burn the place to the ground, both of which are reckless, irresponsible, and stupid."

— Dylan Ratigan, 10 August, 2011 speech on the American economy and political system, The Dylan Ratigan Show, MSNBC

The video of his impassioned speech went viral TV Newser wrote that it was "a powerful, emotional editorial on the economy and Washington".

== Post-television career ==
Since leaving MSNBC, Ratigan has become involved with hydroponic farming. He is the founder of Helical Holdings.

In 2013, he made appearances on The Daily Show and Charlie Rose to discuss his hydroponic farming project employing military veterans.

In 2018, Ratigan unsuccessfully sought the Democratic nomination to challenge Republican incumbent Elise Stefanik in New York's 21st congressional district. Ratigan said that he has never voted in an election, claiming a "disgust" with "two choices that are available to" him. Ratigan lost the Democratic primary election, to Tedra Cobb, but won a write-in campaign for the Women's Equality Party nomination in the same district by getting two votes (two other write-in candidates got one vote each). The chair of the Women's Equality Party, Susan Zimet, announced efforts to stop Ratigan from running on the party's ballot line to prevent the party from being a spoiler.

Following the beginning of the COVID-19 pandemic, Ratigan established the US Medical Glove Company, of which he became CEO. The company, which is based at a former Caterpillar factory in Montgomery, Illinois, has a stated aim of helping to reduce US dependence on imports of medical gloves from East Asia, whilst providing high-paying manufacturing jobs.

Since January 2022, Ratigan has co-hosted a weekly podcast with Tom Sosnoff titled “Truth or Skepticism” focusing on finance and macroeconomics.
