= Betty Liu =

Hong Kong journalist (born 1973)

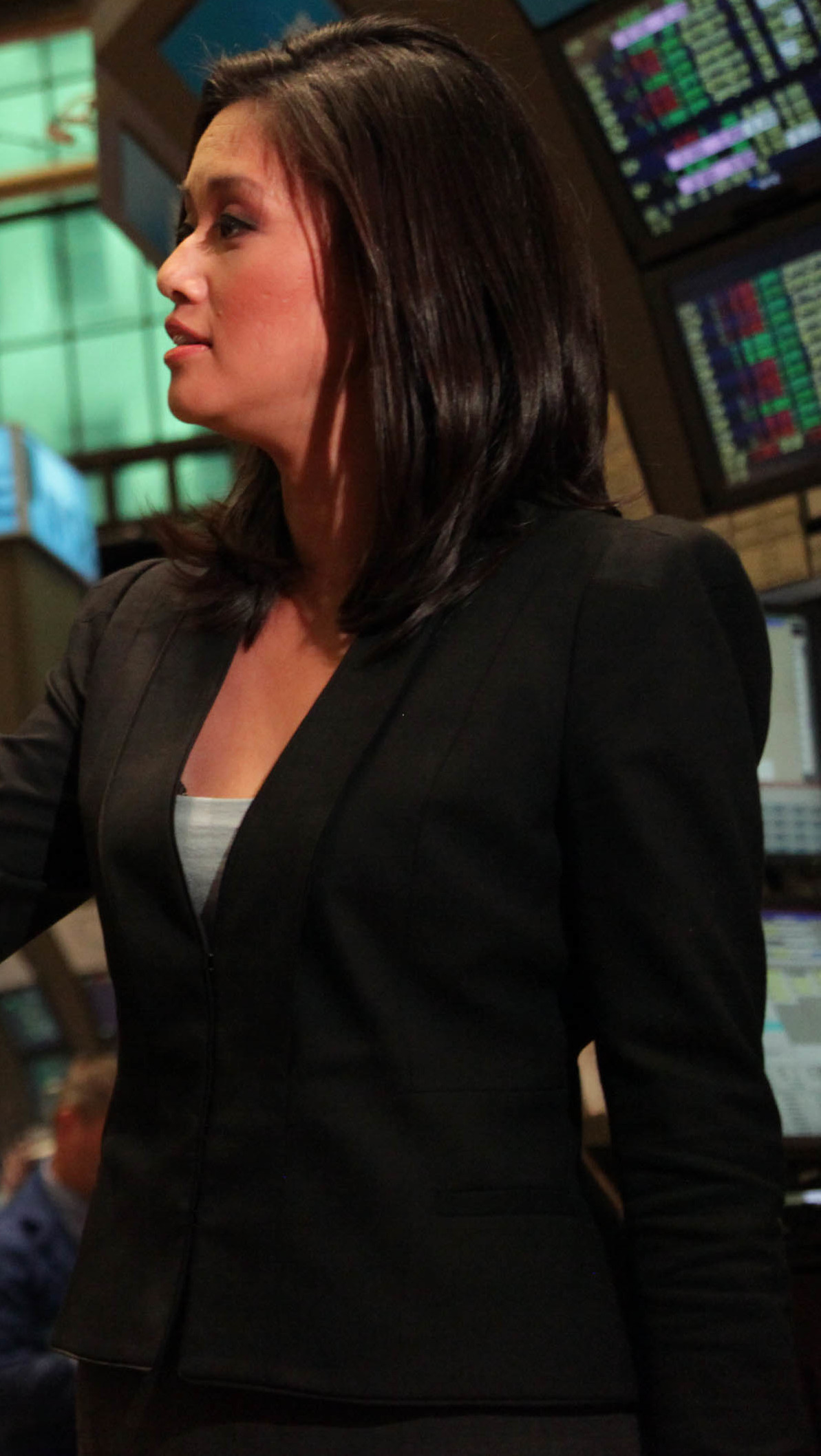
- Liu in 2010
- Born: Betty W. Liu; 1973 (age 52–53); British Hong Kong
- Status: Divorced
- Education: University of Pennsylvania (B.A., English, 1995)
- Occupations: Executive, journalist, news anchor, author
- Employer(s): ICE and NYSE Group
- Known for: Bloomberg Television's news anchor, host of "In The Loop With Betty Liu"
- Notable work: Work Smarts: What CEOs Say You Need to Know to Get Ahead (2013)
- Television: In the Loop with Betty Liu
- Title: Entrepreneur
- Children: Dylan and Zachary (born July 21, 2004)
- Awards: Dow Jones Newswires Award (1997)
- Website: betty-liu.com

Betty W. Liu (Chinese: 刘文思) is a journalist and the Executive Vice Chairman of the New York Stock Exchange and the Chief Experience Officer of Intercontinental Exchange. Liu joined the NYSE Group after ICE acquired Radiate, the ed-tech startup she founded. Liu is a former news anchor for Bloomberg Television, a subsidiary of Bloomberg L.P.

Liu was the founder and CEO of ed-tech startup Radiate, based in New York City.

== Early life and education ==
Liu was born in Hong Kong. She moved to the United States when she was three years old, and from age twelve she was raised in Philadelphia. Liu attended Central High School.

She graduated in 1995 from the University of Pennsylvania with a degree in English.

== Career ==
Liu started her career in financial journalism as a Hong Kong-based regional correspondent and youngest Taiwan Bureau Chief for Dow Jones Newswires.

After she left Dow Jones, she worked for several years as the Atlanta Bureau Chief for the Financial Times, where she broke stories on top corporate and political leaders such as Coca-Cola ex-chief executive Douglas Daft, former Home Depot CEO Bob Nardelli, and former U.S. President Jimmy Carter.

Returning to Asia as an anchor and correspondent for CNBC Asia, Liu covered the daily market action in the Greater China region for all of CNBC's morning shows, including for CNBC's Squawk Box.

Over the course of her career, she has also written for The Wall Street Journal and Far Eastern Economic Review

From 2007 to 2018, she worked for Bloomberg Television, formerly anchoring "In the Loop with Betty Liu" from its inception in 2007 until the show's cancelation in June 2015, which was replaced with "Market Movers". Liu then anchored the morning program "Daybreak Asia" out of NYC and was an Editor-at-Large at Bloomberg. She also hosted "In the Loop, At the Half" on Bloomberg Radio.

In 2017 Liu founded RadiateInc.com, a subscription website offering business micro-lessons from the top CEOs.

Liu became High Point University's Media Entrepreneur in Residence in October 2017.

Radiate Inc was acquired by Intercontinental Exchange in 2018, and Liu became Executive Vice Chairman of ICE.

In 2021, Liu founded D and Z Media Acquisition Corp, a SPAC that focuses on the emerging subscription economy.

== Awards ==
In 1997, she received a Dow Jones Newswires Award for her coverage of the Asian financial crisis.

Her coverage while at FT of the biggest Fortune 500 companies based in the South (Coca-Cola, Home Depot, UPS, FedEx) earned her a spot on TJFR's "Top 30 business journalists under 30 list" three years in a row (2000–2002).

On October 27, 2011, Betty Liu became the first female and Asian student to be inducted into Central High School's Alumni Hall of Fame.

In 2012, Bloomberg TV ran an advertising campaign incorrectly touting Liu as "Pulitzer Prize-nominated". When contacted by msnbc.com, Bloomberg TV acknowledged the error and said it would correct the ads. The same claim of a Pulitzer nomination was made by the publisher of her biography, Age Smart: Discovering the Fountain of Youth at Midlife and Beyond.

== Personal life ==
Liu has been married twice, first to Ohio neurologist Benjamin L. Walter (also a Central High School graduate, whom she married on September 14, 2002 and divorced in 2006) and then to William Browning, an Australian news executive whom she met in Hong Kong. They divorced in 2012.

Liu is a mother of twin boys, Dylan and Zachary, who were born July 21, 2004, by her first husband. They live in Millburn, New Jersey.

Liu is fluent in Mandarin, and speaks some Cantonese.

== Bibliography ==
- Jeffrey A. Rosensweig, Ph.D. and Betty Liu, Age Smart: Discovering the Fountain of Youth at Midlife and Beyond (Upper Saddle River, New Jersey: Prentice Hall, April 2006 ISBN 978-0-13-186762-8)
- Betty Liu, Work Smarts: What CEOs Say You Need To Know to Get Ahead (Hoboken, New Jersey: John Wiley & Sons, December 9, 2013 ISBN 978-1-118-74467-3)

== See also ==
- Chinese Americans in New York City
- New Yorkers in journalism
