= Susan Li =

TV journalist

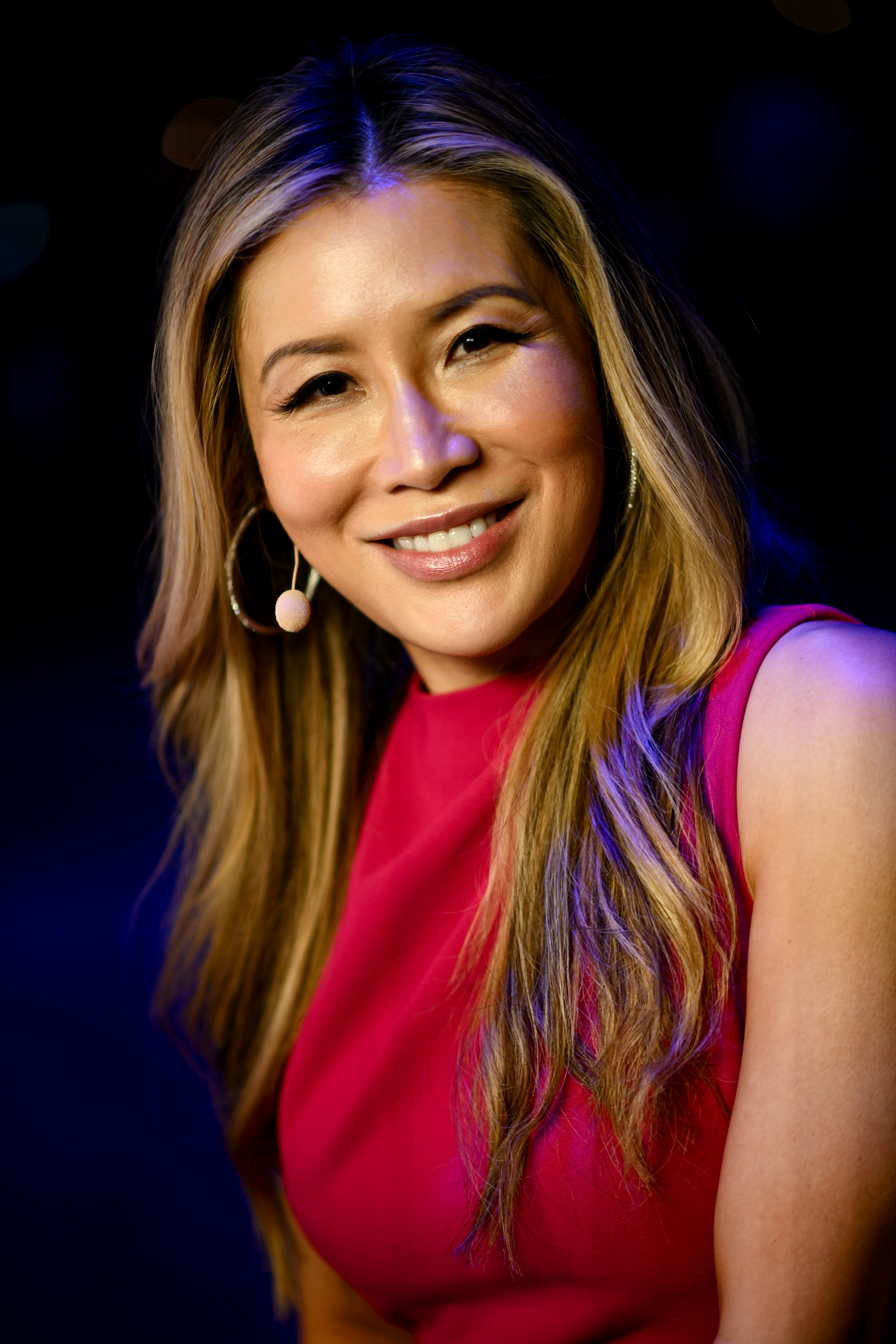
- Li in 2024
- Born: May 1, 1985 (age 41); China
- Education: University of Toronto
- Occupation: Journalist

Susan Li (born May 1, 1985) is a TV journalist who works for American television channel Fox Business Network.

== Early life and education ==
Li was born in China and grew up in Toronto, Canada. Her mentor was her mother, who raised a family on her own in Canada after emigrating from China. She graduated from the University of Toronto with a degree in economics.

== Career ==
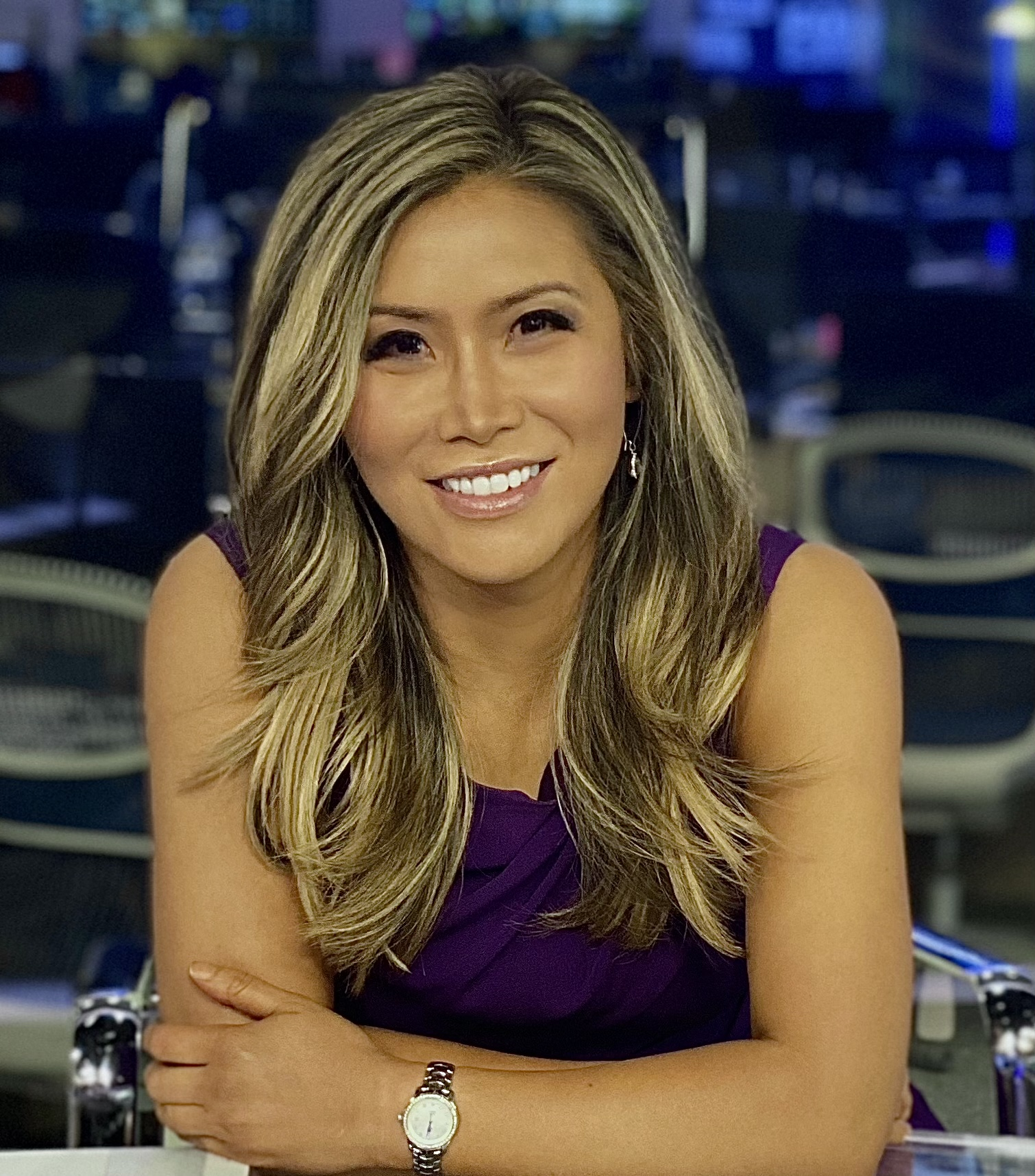
Li in December 2021

=== CBC ===
Li began her career at the Canadian Broadcasting Corporation, where she contributed in various roles including associate producer and freelance reporter for both radio and television.

=== Bloomberg Television ===
Li joined Bloomberg Television in 2006 as host of the channel's first primetime evening newscast in the Asia-Pacific region, Asia Business Tonight. She started hosting Bloomberg Edge and Morning Call in 2010. She hosted the First Up with Susan Li morning business show, where she focused on market openings across Asia, interviewed business leaders, and reported on top news stories from across the globe. Li also hosted Asia Stars, which had the distinction of largely being filmed onboard Hong Kong's famous Star Ferry as it crossed Victoria Harbour. She was also a co-host of Asia Edge, which featured more extensive interviews and news coverage.

In 2008, she was nominated for the Best News Anchor award at the Asian Television Awards. In 2012 at the 17th Asian Television Awards, First Up won the Best News Programme Award, for which she as host was "Highly Commended" as Best Anchor.

As part of Bloomberg International's global programming, Li was seen around the world. During her time at the channel, she interviewed business and government leaders, including Japanese Prime Minister Shinzō Abe, Baidu CEO Robin Li, author Malcolm Gladwell, BlackRock Chairman and CEO Larry Fink and, and American casino developer Steve Wynn. She reported on and covered events such as the 2008 Summer Olympics in Beijing, the Shanghai World Expo, the Chinese stock bubble of 2007, and the 2008 financial crisis.

=== CNBC Asia ===
In 2014, Li joined CNBC Asia as co-anchor of Asia Squawk Box. Li also hosted First Class - CNBC International's luxury travel show. At the APEC Summit in Beijing in 2014, Li held the session on stage after Russian Prime Minister Vladimir Putin and before US President Barack Obama's address. Asia Squawk Box was named the Best News Program at the Asian Television Awards in 2015 with Li as co-host. In May 2014, she interviewed Indian Finance Minister P Chidambaram and Bank of Japan Governor Haruhiko Kuroda at the Asian Development Bank's annual meeting in Kazakhstan and Azerbaijan. Li has also covered the World Economic Forum in Davos Switzerland.

=== CNBC Europe ===
In September 2015, Li left CNBC Asia to join its London-based sister network CNBC Europe. She was a co-anchor of Worldwide Exchange along with Wilfred Frost (son of the late David Frost) through 31 December 2015. She last co-hosted the show from London and also on location throughout Asia and Europe.

=== CNBC ===
Li joined CNBC in January 2016 as a correspondent and a relief presenter in New York. While at the channel, Li has interviewed Canadian Prime Minister Justin Trudeau, Morgan Stanley CEO James Gorman, Robert De Niro, Nobu Matsuhisa, and Jet Li. She left CNBC in August 2017.

=== FOX Business ===
Li joined Fox Business as a business correspondent in April 2018. Since joining, Li has interviewed Apple Inc CEO Tim Cook, Canadian Prime Minister Justin Trudeau, Uber's CEO Dara Khosrowshahi, Airbnb's founder Brian Chesky, and Binance billionaire Changpeng Zhao during the FTX collapse. Li's interview with Apple CEO Tim Cook in February 2020 was the first ever for Cook on Fox and picked up widely in the WSJ, NY Times, Bloomberg and many other outlets. In mid-December 2022, during a round of Elon Musk's Twitter suspensions, Li's account was among those suspended. Li has also been a vocal media advocate speaking up against the rise in anti-Asian violence joining a Paley Center panel on Asian Voices in Media that included Ken Jeong, Olivia Munn and Jon Chu. Li first reported that Sam Bankman-Fried had applied for a Presidential Pardon from President Trump in June 2026 with an exclusive interview with Bankman-Fried from prison. Her reporting was quoted in numerous publications including Bloomberg, CNN, Financial Times, Forbes, NYT Dealbook and Politico among others.

== Awards ==
- Best Anchor, 17th Asian Television Awards (for "First Up with Susan Li")
