= Martin Soong =

Singaporean television presenter (born 1959)

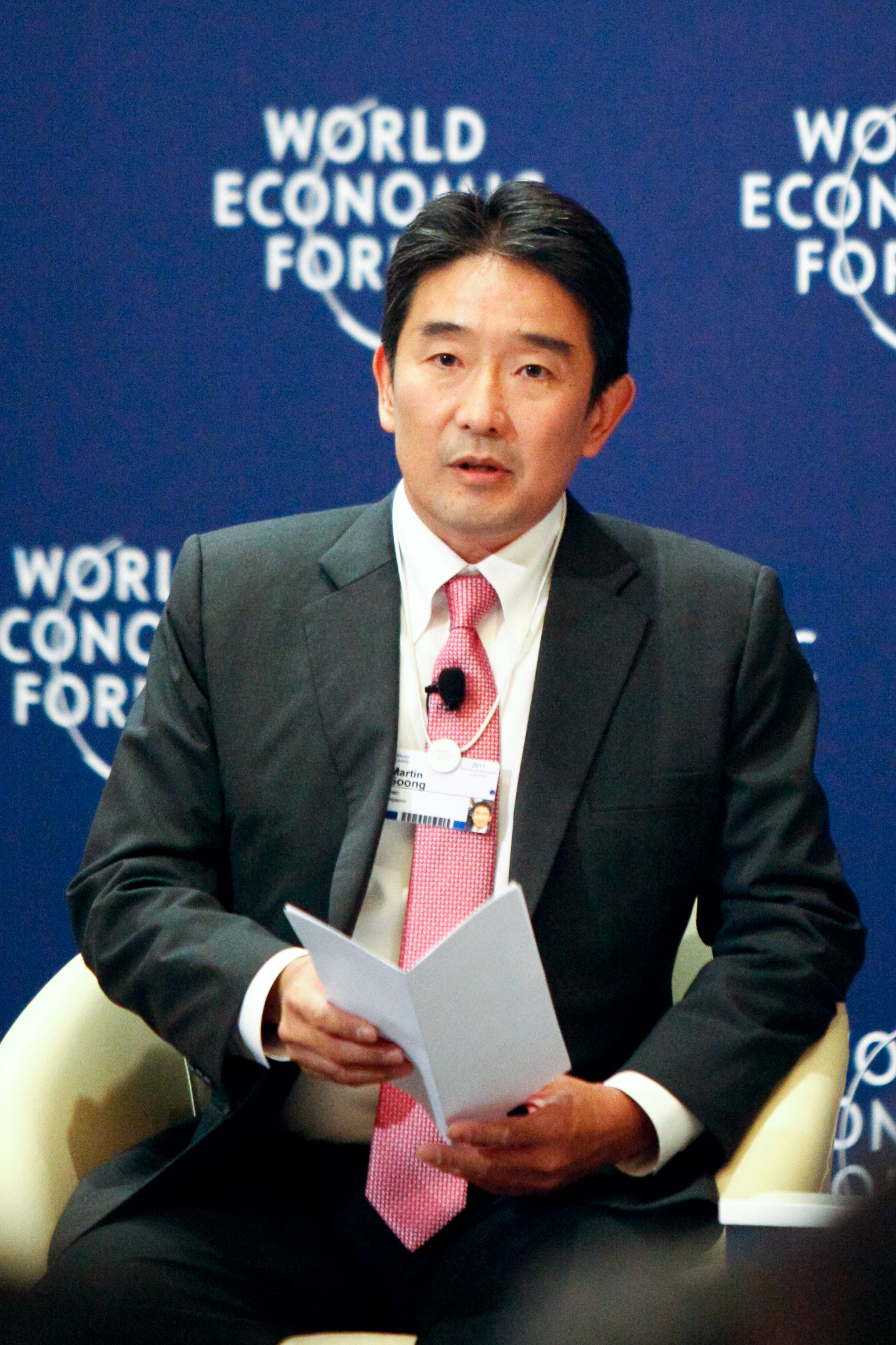
- Martin Soong, captured during "Redrawing the "Greenprint" of Asia's Energy Architecture" at the World Economic Forum on East Asia in Jakarta, Indonesia, June 2011
- Born: 1959 (age 66–67); Hong Kong
- Occupation: Journalist
- Awards: Best News and Current Affairs Presenter Award (1996, 1998, 2009); Silver World Medal for Best News Anchor (1997)

Martin Soong (born 1959 in Hong Kong) is a former CNBC business presenter based in Singapore. He had previously co-anchor with Oriel Morrison on CNBC Asia's Street Signs and had been a longtime co-anchor of CNBC's trademark morning program, Asia Squawk Box.

== Early life ==
Soong is a fifth generation Hawaiian Chinese; his father, a journalist, founded the Asia Magazine in the 1950s and his mother was born in China. Soong has 3 brothers and 1 sister.

== Career ==
Soong was part of the team that launched Asia Business News in 1993, and joined CNBC Asia when it merged with Asian Business News in 1998. During his tenure, Martin has anchored almost all of CNBC's flagship business shows. He left CNBC in 2004 to join CNN in their Hong Kong office before returning to CNBC the following year (2005).

Soong has won many awards, including the Best News and Current Affairs Presenter Award at the Asian Television Awards 7 times, including 1996, 1998 and 2009, and Silver World Medal for Best News Anchor in the 1997 New York Festivals of International Television Programming and Promotion.

He began his full-time journalistic career in 1983 with The Business Times in Singapore as a reporter, and then he worked for Singapore Broadcasting Corporation as a producer/anchor and The Straits Times as a correspondent. Soong has covered many major stories from across Asia and interviewed many key political leaders and CEOs.

After 9 years as co-anchor of Asia Squawk Box, Soong began co-anchoring a then-new program, Street Signs (based on the CNBC US programme of the same name), along with Oriel Morrison, on 31 March 2014.
