= Mark Haines =

American anchorman (1946–2011)

- Born: April 19, 1946; Oyster Bay, New York, U.S.
- Died: May 24, 2011 (aged 65); Marlboro Township, New Jersey, U.S.
- Education: Denison University; University of Pennsylvania Law School
- Occupation: Anchorman
- Years active: 1979–2011
- Title: CNBC Business News Anchor
- Spouse: Cindy
- Children: 2
- Website: www.cnbc.com/id/15838129

Mark Haines (April 19, 1946 – May 24, 2011) was a host on the CNBC television network.

== Early life and education ==
Haines grew up in Oyster Bay, New York, and resided in Monmouth County, New Jersey. His alma mater was Denison University, and in 1989, the University of Pennsylvania Law School. He was a member of the New Jersey bar association.

== Career ==
Haines was a news anchor for KYW-TV in Philadelphia; WABC-TV in New York; and WPRI-TV in Providence. While at WPRO-AM in Providence, Haines took part in a 1974 reenactment of the War of the Worlds radio broadcast. It is reported that Cary Grant considered Haines his favorite television reporter.

In 1989, Haines joined the newly created CNBC network. Haines was the host of the CNBC TV shows Squawk Box and Squawk on the Street. Haines was on the air when news of the September 11 attacks first broke in 2001 . Squawk on the Street was expanded from one hour to two on July 19, 2007, when co-anchor Liz Claman of Morning Call left to co-anchor Fox Business on the Fox Business Network. Haines also presented a financial segment prior to the market open each day on MSNBC's Morning Joe.

Haines' longtime co-anchor on Squawk on the Street was Erin Burnett. On May 6, 2011, just weeks before Haines died, she moved on to CNN. With the loss of both prior hosts, Simon Hobbs & Melissa Lee filled in as co-anchors.

On March 10, 2009, Haines famously called the bottom of the stock market of the United States bear market of 2007–2009, referred to as "The Haines Bottom."

== Death ==
On May 25, 2011, Haines' wife Cindy reported that he had died the previous evening at his home in Marlboro Township, New Jersey. He is survived by his wife, a son, and a daughter. He died of congestive heart failure due to cardiomegaly.

Just after the market opened on May 25, CNBC broadcast that Haines had died the previous evening. There was silence on the NYSE trading floor and CNBC presented a retrospective on his life and career. A special television program about his life and career aired on CNBC that evening.

== Host shows ==
- Squawk Box (1995‍–‍2005)
- Squawk on the Street (2005‍–‍2011)
- Morning Call (2006‍–‍2007)
- How to Succeed in Business
