= Tanvir Gill =

- Born: Jamnagar, Gujarat
- Education: MBA
- Years active: 2005-present
- Employer: CNBC
- Known for: Business anchor

Tanvir Gill is a news anchor at CNBC. She was previously an anchor at ET Now, the business channel of The Economic Times, India's financial daily, from The Times Group. She had a brief stint with Gaon Connection as well.

== Career ==
Gill completed her graduation in commerce from Jesus and Mary College & MBA in finance from Delhi University. Before joining ET Now she worked with CNBC-TV18 from 2006 to 2009. She is an NCFM-NSE certified mutual fund advisor. While at CNBC-TV18, she hosted morning band shows like Your Stocks and Mid Cap Radar. She also anchored the segment, "Saas Bahu Sensex", that gave investment advise to women investors all over India. She also provided India reports for the CNBC Worldwide programs Cash Flow and Capital Connection.

At ET NOW, she led coverage of global markets, having interviewed global investors & economists including Warren Buffett, Howard Marks, Ray Dalio, Mohnish Pabrai, Gopichand Hinduja, Mohamed El Erian, Rakesh Jhunjhunwala, Guy Spier, Marc Faber, Jim O'Neill, Raghuram Rajan, Mark Mobius, Vinod Khosla, Byron Wien, Stephen S. Roach, and Wilbur Ross. Gill has interviewed chief investment officers and top fund managers from asset management companies including BlackRock, PIMCO, State Street Global Advisors, Goldman Sachs Asset Management, Fidelity Worldwide Investment, Aberdeen Asset Management, JP Morgan Asset Management, and Allianz Global Investors.

Having joined ET Now since 2009, Gill had been part of the core editorial team driving content on a daily basis during market hours. She anchored "Market Sense", analyzing global & India specific macro economic trends & "Closing Trades" that tracks the last hour market action in India. She has worked with Reuters in New York & London for her international global market series, Global Mantra Market Outlook & The FII View. She has interviewed some of the largest & most influential investors & economists as part of these series.

In Nov 2015 Gill covered PM Narendra Modi's visit to the UK interviewing policy makers like Priti Patel, Employment Minister UK Government, Lord Jim O'Neill, Commercial Secy UK Treasury, & economists & corporate honchos in Lord Meghnad Desai, Sunil Bharti Mittal, Baba Kalyani, Tulsi Tanti among others.

In Jan 2016 Gill hosted The Economic Times Global Business Summit. In attendance were PM Narendra Modi, Finance minister Arun Jaitley and other cabinet minister like Mr Jayant Sinha, global CEOs including Andrew Witty of GlaxoSmithKline, Dominic Barton of McKinsey & Company, and speakers like Nassim Nicholas Taleb. In July 2016 Tanvir covered the Brexit vote & its implications as it happened from Canary Wharf in London. In May 2017, Tanvir covered the Berkshire Hathaway Shareholders Meeting 2017 for viewers & readers of the Times of India Group.

In February 2019, Gill returned to CNBC, this time as anchor and reporter for its Singapore-based Asia network. On 2 December of the same year, she became co-anchor of the Asia version of Street Signs and she continued to be a presenter of that programme until it ended in 2025.
