= May Lee =

American journalist

May Lee (born March 28, 1966) was the host of STAR TV's The May Lee Show when she was based in Singapore. A second generation Korean American, Lee faced gender discrimination and anti-Asian bias early in her career, and spent the 1980s moving between local broadcasters. However, she reached a turning point in 1995, when she joined CNN; she first worked as a correspondent in Tokyo and Hong Kong, and later became the network's first female anchor of Korean descent.

Following her success at CNN, Lee returned to the United States in 1999, where she hosted the talk show Pure Oxygen on The Oxygen Network, and also worked for other major broadcasters including ABC and NBC.

In 2004, Lee returned to the Asia-Pacific region as an anchor for The Wall Street Journal Asia, CNBC's Asian financial news program, and then co-anchored CNBC Tonight with Teymoor Nabili until December 2005. Though she initially worried that as she aged, her career opportunities would decrease, she stated that her popular reception had improved due to her "experience and flexibility".

In 2007, inspired by the economic and social changes she had seen in her five years away from Asia, she launched The May Lee Show, an English-language talk show modelled on The Oprah Winfrey Show and aimed specifically at Asian women. STAR TV placed great importance on the promotion of the new show, giving it a prime time slot right after the semi-final of American Idol, before moving it to the Sunday 8 P.M. slot two weeks later. The program discusses both soft issues such as fashion and celebrities, as well as social problems such as divorce, infidelity, and child trafficking; guests on the first episode included American actress Joan Chen, Australian singer Olivia Newton-John, and New Zealand chef Bobby Chinn.

Lee was appointed the LA-based correspondent for CGTN-America in December 2014. In early 2020, Lee launched her vodcast (video-podcast) "The May Lee Show", a production of her company, Lotus Media House. The show focuses on AAPI people, issues and trends. But COVID-19 and the rise of anti-Asian hate motivated Lee to use her platform to speak up about and speak out on Asian xenophobia and the historic reasons behind it. Because of her efforts to bring attention to the crisis, Lee labeled herself an "Accidental Activist". In July 2020, Forbes recognized Lee as one of "50 Over 50" women making an impact on the world.

Lee was an adjunct professor at the USC Annenberg School for Communication and Journalism where she taught traditional and multimedia journalism for both undergraduate and graduate programs including a new course that debuted Fall of 2021, "Asian American History and Journalism". Lee developed the curriculum to address the lack of AAPI history in order to build better understanding and awareness. As of 2023, she is an assistant professor at Chapman University's College of Film and Media Arts.

Lee is author of "May Lee, Live and in Person" and she's working on an academic publication that will be released in 2022.
