= Eunice Yoon =

American journalist

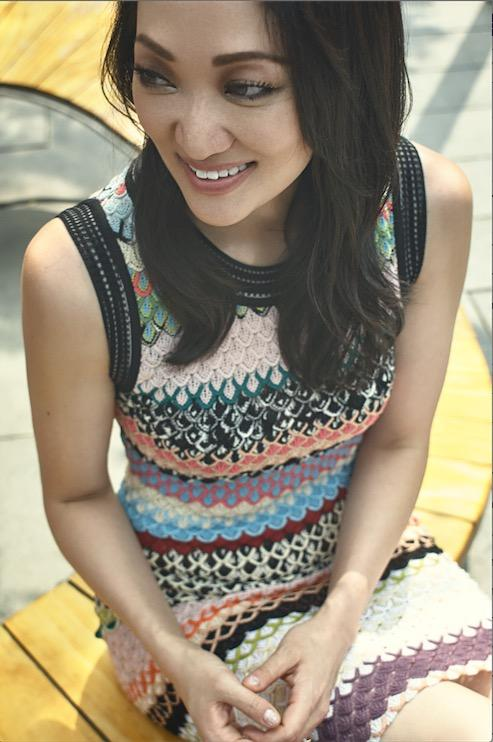
- Citizenship: United States
- Education: Brown University (B.A.)
- Occupation: Broadcast journalism
- Employer: CNBC

Eunice Yoon is an American journalist. She is the China Bureau Chief and Senior Correspondent with CNBC based in Beijing. She is host of the network's feature program Inside China and contributes to NBC News and MSNBC. Previously, Yoon was a correspondent and anchor with CNN in Hong Kong and Beijing.

== Education ==
She is an alumna of Phillips Exeter Academy. Yoon holds a Bachelor of Arts degree with honors in political science from Brown University, where she graduated magna cum laude.

== Career ==
Yoon reports on events in China, such as U.S. President Donald Trump's 2017 visit and the rise in power of Chinese leader Xi Jinping.

Yoon is known for her coverage of major news events, such as the disappearance of Malaysian flight Malaysia Airlines Flight 370 and the Sinking of MV Sewol. She was one of the first journalists to reach the 2008 Sichuan earthquake zone in 2008. Yoon contributed to a team that won the Alfred I. duPont–Columbia University Award, in which she reported on the 2004 Indian Ocean earthquake and tsunami. She has won a New York Festivals Silver Medal in 2014, and received nominations for the Asian Television Awards.

== Links ==
- Eunice's CNBC webpage
