= Trading Matters =

- Genre: business news program
- Presented by: Oriel Morrison
- Country of origin: Australia
- Original language: English

Production
- Running time: 60 minutes. since 2008

Original release
- Network: CNBC Asia; CNBC Europe
- Release: 2 October 2007 – 2014

Related
- incumbent; Incumbent

Trading Matters was a segment on CNBC television's CashFlow. It screened weekdays at 2:40AEDT. It provided viewers with live reports from the Australian Stock Exchange and analysis about the business scene down under.

In a previous incarnation it was a 30 minutes business news bulletin on CNBC that screened at 4pm Australian time on weekdays. The format was 'revised' to the shorter version at the end of 2009.
