= Squawk Australia =

- Genre: Business news program
- Presented by: Karen Tso
- Original language: English

Production
- Production locations: Sydney, Australia
- Running time: 60 minutes

Original release
- Network: CNBC Asia; CNBC Australia
- Release: 26 March 2007 – 11 June 2010

Related
- Asia Squawk Box

Squawk Australia is a television business news program that aired every weekday at 6:00 a.m. Singapore/Hong Kong/Taiwan time on CNBC Asia, live from CNBC Asia's Australia studio in Sydney, from March 2007 to June 2010. It was also simulcasted in the United States on CNBC World; on Sundays, it was simulcasted on CNBC Europe.

== History ==
Squawk Australia premiered on CNBC Asia on 26 March 2007 as part of the Asia firm's significant programming overhaul. It replaced the first hour of Asia Squawk Box, which was then seen an hour later. Originally anchored by Jeffrey James, the show looked ahead to the Australian trading day with locally based analysts and fund managers, as well as recapping overnight trade in the U.S. and providing currency and world news updates. Weather forecasts were provided by The Weather Channel (formerly NBC Weather Plus). CNBC reporter Sri Jegarajah frequently contributed to the program from Singapore.

The program was initially broadcast from a camera position in the General Electric offices near the Sydney Harbour Bridge as an interim measure. A move to a new studio in the Burns Philp building, opposite to the Australian Stock Exchange, took place in October 2007 as the network expanded its Australian output. This was three months later than originally planned.

=== Anchor change and program revamp ===
In August 2008, CNBC announced that Karen Tso from Nine Network would be joining the network as its new Australia-based anchor of Squawk Australia. Tso provided market updates into all of CNBC's pan-Asian and Australian programming.

Tso debuted in October 2008, replacing James. To coincide with the anchor change and program revamp, Squawk Australia also moved to a new studio.

The show was last anchored by Amanda Drury. Drury was an anchor on two of CNBC Asia Pacific's signature morning business programs: Asia Squawk Box and CNBC’s Cash Flow. She has had 10 years' experience as a financial and business TV journalist in Singapore, Tokyo and New York, and was previously based in the CNBC Australia headquarters in Sydney. She was reassigned to the network's U.S. studios in 2010.

=== Cancellation ===
It was announced in early 2010 that Squawk Australia would be cancelled as part of a programming revamp at the network on 14 June 2010. This was also due to the relocation of Karen Tso to Singapore, and Amanda Drury to CNBC headquarters in the U.S.

Squawk Australia was cancelled on 11 June 2010, three days before Asia Squawk Box moved back to its new/old time slot (6am Singapore/Hong Kong Time). Tso was reassigned to Singapore at the time of this program's cancellation. A year and a half later, in January 2012, Tso joined CNBC Europe as co-anchor of Squawk Box Europe. The Australian studio center ceased operations on 9 October 2020.

== Market holidays ==
On days when Australian markets close for a holiday, but other Asian markets remain open, CNBC Asia pre-empted Squawk Australia, instead extending Asia Squawk Box to 4 hours, the longest time for the show ever. This was first seen on 9 April 2007.

== See also ==
- Asia Squawk Box
- Squawk Box Europe
- Squawk Box
- Squawk on the Street (a CNBC US program anchored from the New York Stock Exchange, which follows a similar format)
