= Amanda Drury =

Australian journalist and news anchor

- Born: Amanda Drury; 5 May 1973 (age 53); Melbourne, Australia
- Education: Melbourne University; Australian Film Television and Radio School
- Occupations: News anchor Journalist
- Notable credit: CNBC's Street Signs co-anchor
- Website: www.cnbc.com/id/15839031

Amanda Drury (born 5 May 1973) is an Australian journalist and news anchor for CNBC, hosting finance and business programming from New York City. She was the co-host of the US version of Street Signs until its end on 6 February 2015 and has appeared on other various CNBC shows as an expert in finance and business and also acts as a host on an ad-hoc basis on CNBC Asia's programming.

== Early life and education ==
Drury was born in Melbourne, Victoria, Australia. She received a bachelor's degree in fine arts, Japanese and French from the University of Melbourne and attended the Australian Film, Television and Radio School.

== Career ==
Drury started working in Japan in international relations. She began her broadcast career in radio before making the switch to TV working for Bloomberg in Tokyo from 1999 to 2000. She joined CNBC in January 2001 and spent eight years based at its Asia-Pacific headquarters in Singapore. She hosted Business Centre Australia when it was introduced in 2001.

She was stationed in CNBC Sydney in 2009 before being transferred to CNBC's global headquarters in New Jersey in May 2010. Drury's first position at CNBC USA was as the co-anchor of "The Call". Drury has appeared on other various CNBC shows and segments.

She became the co-presenter of The Call (US version) in March 2011.

Drury was a finalist in the 2007 and 2008 Asian Television Awards in the category of Best News Presenter.
