= Bernard Lo =

Canadian television anchor on CNBC Asia

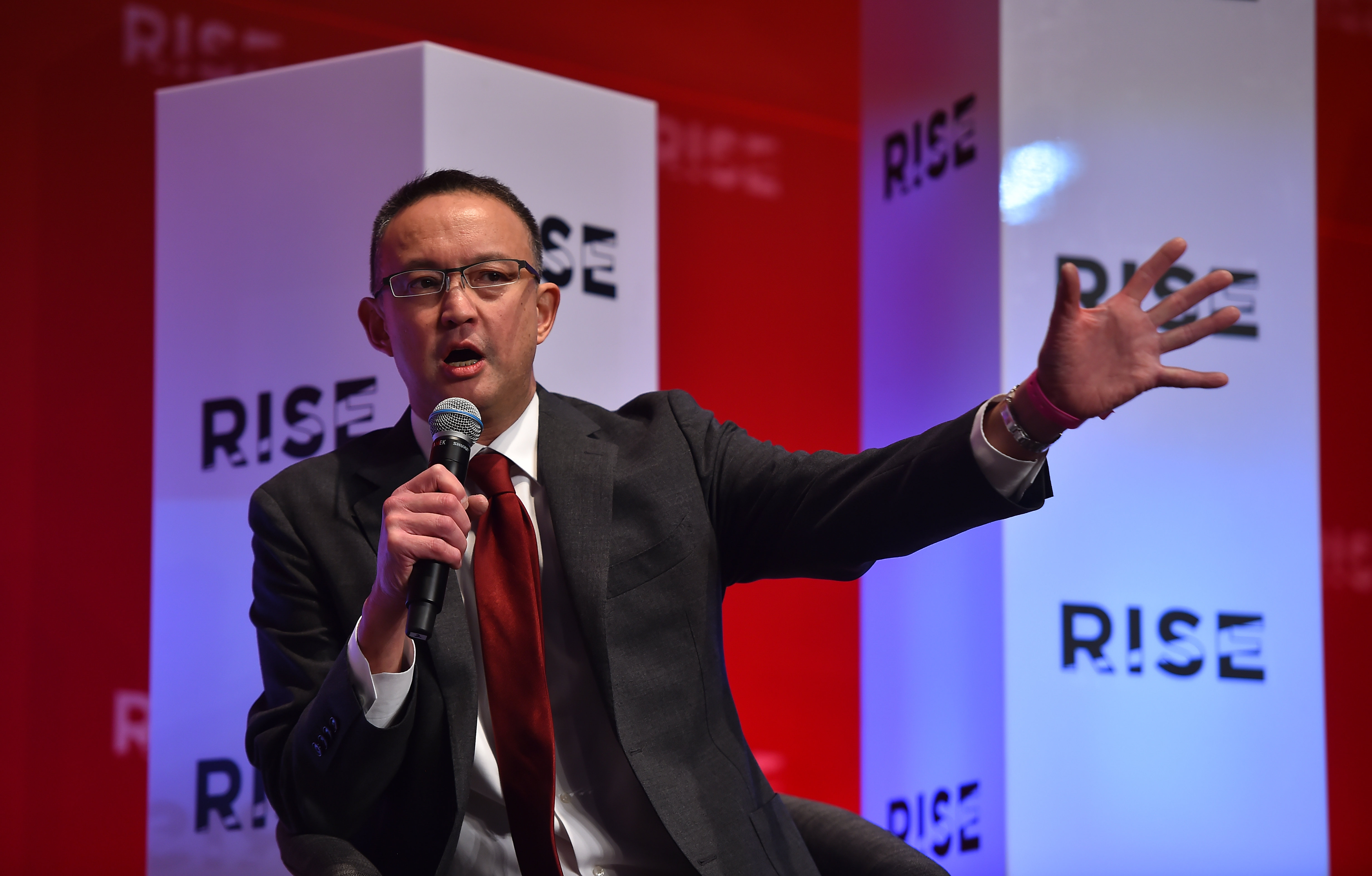
- Born: Vancouver, British Columbia, Canada
- Occupations: TV Anchor and Host

Bernard (Bernie) Lo is a former television news anchor and talk show host.

== Biography ==
Bernard Lo is a professional conference and event host and emcee, moderator and media trainer as well as a fiction writer.

He was formerly a Hong Kong–based news anchor and talk show host who began his career in local television then helped start CNBC Asia when the US broadcaster expanded to the region in 1994. After nearly a decade tenure, he joined Bloomberg Television in 2004 and hosted prime time news programs, and had his own namesake talk show Asia Confidential with Bernie Lo.

Lo returned to CNBC in 2010 and cohosted Squawk Box among other news programs and hosted Straight Talk with Bernie Lo, a talk show and newsmagazine. He suffered a botched spine operation in 2019 and was disabled and unable to work despite multiple botched operations due to the lack of modern spinal surgery knowledge and skill by Hong Kong spine surgeons. Due to the generosity and compassion of his thousands of followers on “X”, he was able to seek proper competent care in 2022 at Cedars-Sinai Hospital in Los Angeles where a complete spine reconstruction was performed. After multiple minor post-surgical complications he was finally diagnosed as healed in November 2024 although he continues to suffer mobility issues due to 9 levels of his spine now permanently immobilized by spinal fusion.

Lo holds an Associate of Arts and Sciences degree from Tacoma Community College (1985), a Bachelor of Arts from The Evergreen State College (1987) and a Masters of Science from the University of Idaho (1990).

He continues to reside in Hong Kong with his wife and feline daughter Mia and is trying to resurrect his career using his three decades of experience in television news hosting to host and emcee conferences, moderate debates and panels, provide executive media training and is also beginning to write fiction novels. He is also planning podcast and YouTube casting programming in the near future.
