= CNBC World =

American pay television business news channel

- Logo used since 2025
- Country: United States
- Headquarters: Englewood Cliffs, New Jersey, United States

Programming
- Picture format: United States; 1080i HDTV (downscaled to letterboxed 480i for the SDTV feed); International feeds 1080i HDTV (downscaled to 16:9 480i/576i for the SDTV feeds)

Ownership
- Owner: Versant
- Parent: CNBC
- Sister channels: U.S. CNBC; MS NOW; International; CNBC Europe; CNBC Asia; CNBC-TV18; CNBC Indonesia

History
- Launched: July 1, 2001

Links
- Website: cnbc.com/world

Availability

Streaming media
- CNBC Pro: (pay service)

CNBC World is an American pay television business news channel owned by Versant, which provides coverage of world markets alongside the domestic CNBC service, using programmes from CNBC's international networks based in Europe, Asia, India, and other regions served by a domestic CNBC channel or affiliate. Effectively, this makes the network's prime time timeslot the graveyard slot, due to time zone differences, when it simulcasts live programming from their overseas sister networks.

During U.S. trading hours covered by the main CNBC network, pre-taped shows from CNBC's different international channels (e.g. CNBC-TV18 and CNBC Indonesia) are seen on the channel, along with CNBC Prime reality programming such as American Greed and other CNBC specials are shown. This is done to force viewers to tune in to the main CNBC service for business information outside the Eurasian market days.

As of 2026, the network is not offered in high definition by most providers, and the only way to watch CNBC's international networks in that format in the United States is through the premium monthly/yearly streaming service, "CNBC Pro", as most providers offer it only as a standard definition offering.

Before 2001, CNBC Asia's coverage was seen on American cable via the International Channel, both before and after that network's merger with Asia Business News.

== Availability ==
=== Online ===
CNBC World is available to stream on several TV streaming services including FuboTV, and DirecTV Stream. Along with the rest of NBCUniversal's NBC and Telemundo stations, CNBC World is available on Charter Communications's streaming service Spectrum TV Stream.

== Live programming ==
- Squawk Box Asia
- Access Middle East
- Squawk Box Europe
- Decision Time (CNBC Europe's programme covering the UK and ECB bank lending rates announcements)

== See also ==
- CNN International
