= Christine Tan =

Singaporean financial journalist

Christine Tan (born 1970) is a Singaporean financial journalist with CNBC Asia and is the Singapore-based anchor for CNBC Asia's longest-running feature programme, "Managing Asia," where she interviews key executives and leaders of Asian companies.

== Early life and education ==
Tan was born in Singapore, and grew up in Serangoon Gardens with her parents and younger brother. After attending Catholic Junior College, she went to New Zealand for her post-secondary studies.

Tan holds a Bachelor of Arts degree in Sociology and English and a Master of Arts degree with Honors in Sociology from the University of Auckland, New Zealand.

== Career ==
Tan has more than 30 years experience in journalism, more than two decades of which was with CNBC. Prior to joining CNBC, she was the Senior Producer and Presenter of the current affairs show Money Mind.

Tan joined CNBC Asia in 1999 and was supposed to become one of Channel NewsAsia's initial presenters.

She received the Best News Program award at the 2004 Asian Television Awards on behalf of The Asian Wall Street Journal. The same program also won a finalist award at the 2004 New York Festivals for Coverage of a Breaking News Story.

Christine Tan also received Silver World Medal for Best Anchor at the 2009 New York Festivals Television Programming and Promotion Awards. She also won for Best Current Affairs Presenter award at the 2008 Asian Television Awards. She was a finalist for Best News Anchor in 2001 and 2002 at the New York Festivals Awards and also a Best Current Affairs Presenter finalist at the 1997 and 2006 Asian Television Awards.

Tan was also a finalist for Best News Anchor in 2001 and 2002 at the New York Festivals Awards. She was also a Best Current Affairs Presenter finalist at the 1997 Asian Television Awards and received High Commendations.
