= Oppel =

Oppel is a surname. Notable people with the surname include:

- Albert Oppel (1831–1865), German paleontologist
- Kenneth Oppel (born 1967), Canadian author
- Nicolaus Michael Oppel (1782–1820), German naturalist
- Reinhard Oppel (1878–1941), German composer
- Richard Oppel (born 1943), American journalist
- Richard A. Oppel Jr., American journalist
- Richard Craig Oppel (born 1967), American swimmer
- Robert Opel (1939–1979), born Robert Oppel before changing his name to Opel, American photographer, art gallery owner, and streaker
- Thomas Oppel (born 1953), American politician
