= Bullseye (American TV program) =

2003–2005 news television series

- Presented by: Dylan Ratigan
- Country of origin: United States
- Original language: English

Production
- Running time: 60 minutes

Original release
- Network: CNBC
- Release: December 8, 2003 – March 11, 2005

Related
- Business Center; Mad Money

Bullseye is a news and analysis program that aired on CNBC at 6 pm ET weekdays from December 8, 2003 to March 11, 2005. Hosted by Dylan Ratigan, it covered breaking news stories from business to pop culture and offered guidance on personal finance with the help of CNBC reporter Steve Liesman and his economy charts drawn on "Easels". The program had music selected by a CNBC intern called Grecco.

One segment on the show was called Whine & Cheese, where Ratigan served wine and cheese to his guests and talked about the news in business and corporate governance.

On the last episode of the show, on the segment called Bullseye Perspective, Ratigan served as moderator of an economics debate between Lawrence Kudlow and Paul Krugman of The New York Times.

Frequent guests included CNBC anchor Rebecca Quick and brothers and stock traders Jon Najarian and Pete Najarian from Najarian Capital in Chicago, who also appear on the syndicated TV program First Business on various U.S. TV stations.

On another segment named Bullseye on America, CNBC reporters gave insight into the state of the U.S. economy.

The show was replaced by Jim Cramer's Mad Money on March 14, 2005.
