= 19th century in ichnology =

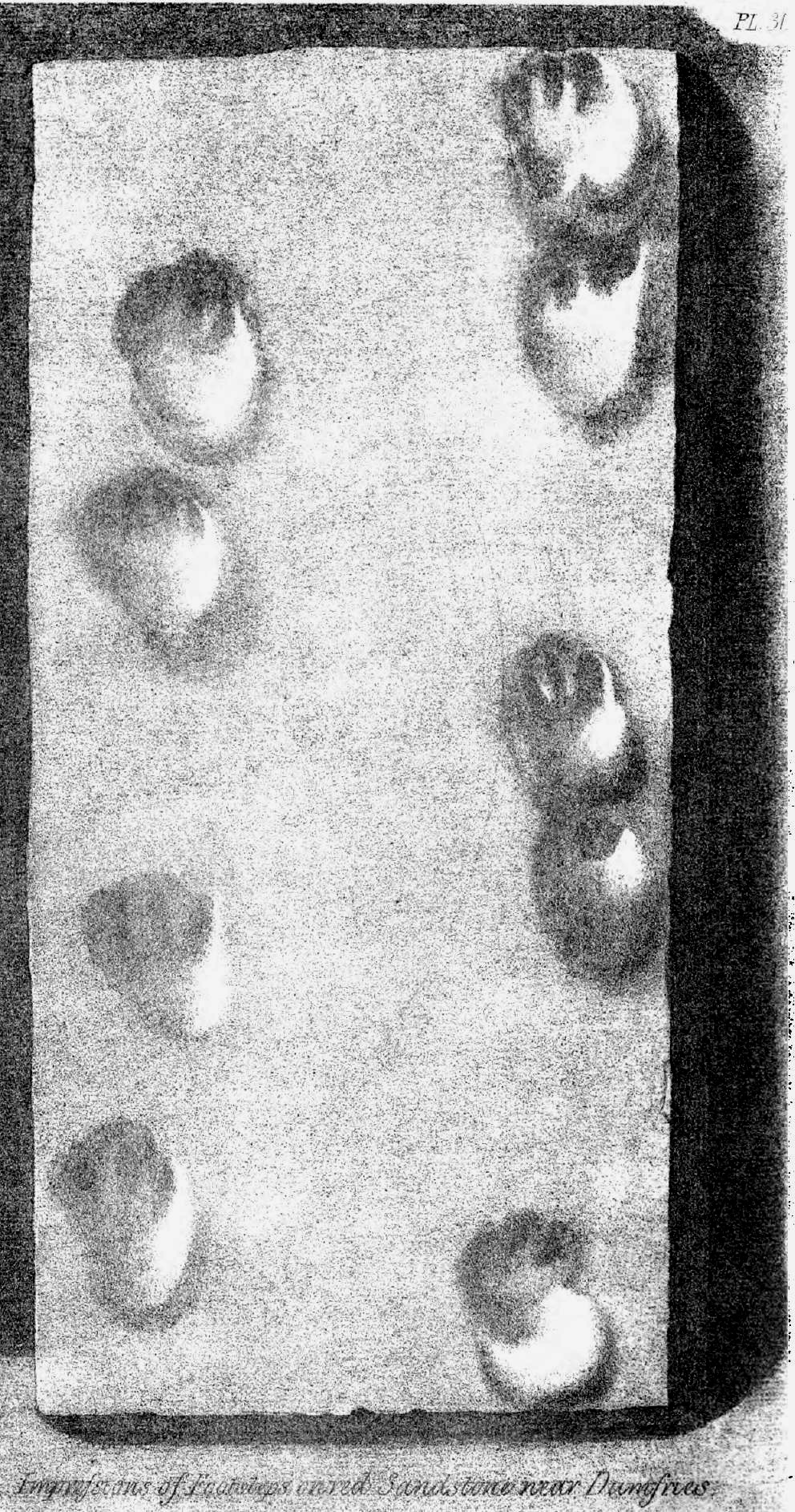
Illustration of Chelichnus, the first kind of fossil footprint to be studied by scientists. It was originally thought to have been left by a tortoise, but is now attributed to an evolutionary precursor to mammals.

The 19th century in ichnology refers to advances made between the years 1800 and 1899 in the scientific study of trace fossils, the preserved record of the behavior and physiological processes of ancient life forms, especially fossil footprints. The 19th century was notably the first century in which fossil footprints received scholarly attention. British paleontologist William Buckland performed the first true scientific research on the subject during the early 1830s.

A slab of Permian-aged sandstone had been discovered in Scotland which preserved a series of unusual footprints. After acquiring the specimen, Buckland experimented with modern animals to ascertain the trackmaker and concluded that the Scottish footprints were made by tortoises. Later in the century famed advocate of evolution Thomas Henry Huxley would refute this attribution and these footprints, called Chelichnus, would remain without an identified trackmaker until scientists recognized that they were actually made by an evolutionary precursor to mammals.

The 1830s also saw the discovery and investigation of unusual hand-shaped footprints from Triassic rocks in Germany that were later named Chirotherium. The identification of the Chirotherium trackmaker proved elusive and suggestions from researchers included everything from monkeys to giant toads and kangaroos. Chirotherium proved to be an enduring ichnological mystery that would not be solved until long into the 20th century.

Some of the most important ichnological research of the 19th century occurred across the Atlantic in the United States. Dinosaur footprints were first discovered there in 1802 when a Massachusetts farm boy stumbled upon bird-like footprints in sandstone that the local clergy mistakenly attributed to the raven that Noah released from his ark during the Biblical Flood. The region's footprints came to the attention of scholars during the mid 1830s when further bird-like dinosaur tracks were discovered elsewhere in the state. These became the lifelong preoccupation of prominent ichnologist Edward Hitchcock. Hitchcock thought the tracks were made by giant flightless birds.

Late in the 19th century prisoners in Nevada discovered a major Ice Age track site at what was once an ancient lake shore. Many of the trackmakers were familiar animals like mammoths or even more modern animals like deer and wolves, but this track site also seemed to preserve the tracks of a sandal-wearing giant. The tracks received significant scholarly and popular attention like satire by Mark Twain who attributed the giant tracks to primitive Nevadan legislators. However, the true identity of the "giant" trackmaker was recognized by paleontologists Joseph Le Conte and Othniel Charles Marsh as a giant ground sloth, possibly of the genus Mylodon.

== 19th century ==
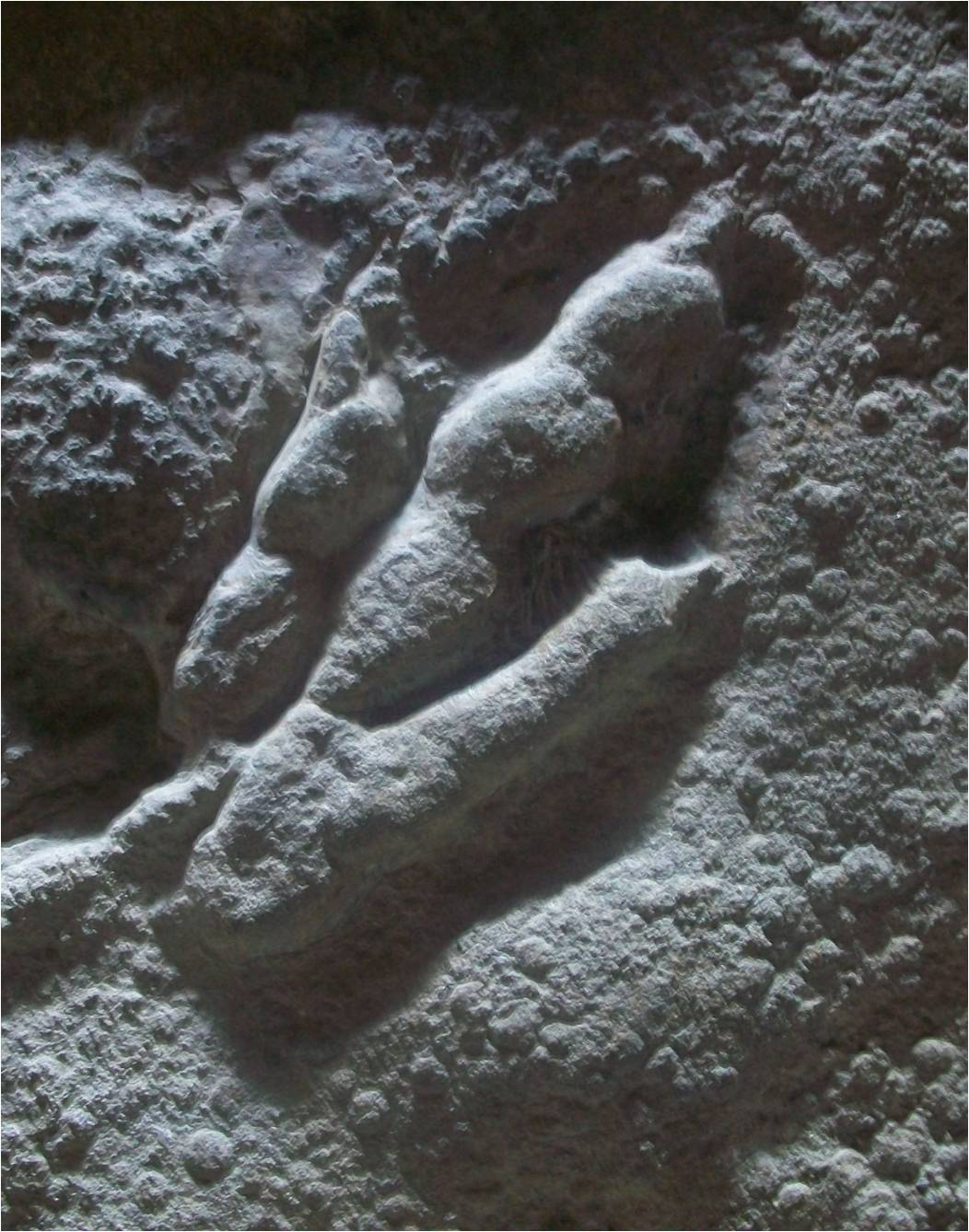
Grallator

=== 1800s ===
==== 1802 ====
- Spring: A boy named Pliny Moody uncovered a piece of sandstone with mysterious three-toed tracks about 30 cm (1 foot) long while plowing in his father's fields near South Hadley, Massachusetts. The local clergy thought the tracks had been left by the raven that Noah sent out from the ark to look for dry land during the Biblical Flood.

=== 1820s ===
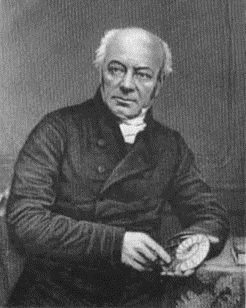
William Buckland, the paleontologist who described the first Chelichnus tracks

- A slab of Permian sandstone preserving 24 small footprints came into the possession of the Scottish Reverend Henry Duncan. Duncan visited the quarry where his slab was originally excavated in Corncockle Muir to see if he could find more of the fascinating impressions and successfully recovered more of them. He notified leading paleontologist William Buckland of Oxford University about his discovery.

==== Late 1820s ====
- Fossil footprints were reported from Cheshire, England in Triassic rocks known at the time as the New Red Sandstone. This is the earliest written record of fossil footprints now referred to the ichnogenus Chirotherium.

==== 1828 ====
- A newspaper article was published that discussed fossil footprints, and is now regarded as the earliest written record of the subject.

=== 1830s ===
==== 1831 ====
- Buckland published the first scientific description of fossil footprints about the tracks discovered at Corncockle Muir. He attributed the footprints to ancient tortoises because after having various modern reptiles walk over stretches of pie crust dough, the tracks left by tortoises most closely resembled those from the Permian sandstone.

==== 1834 ====
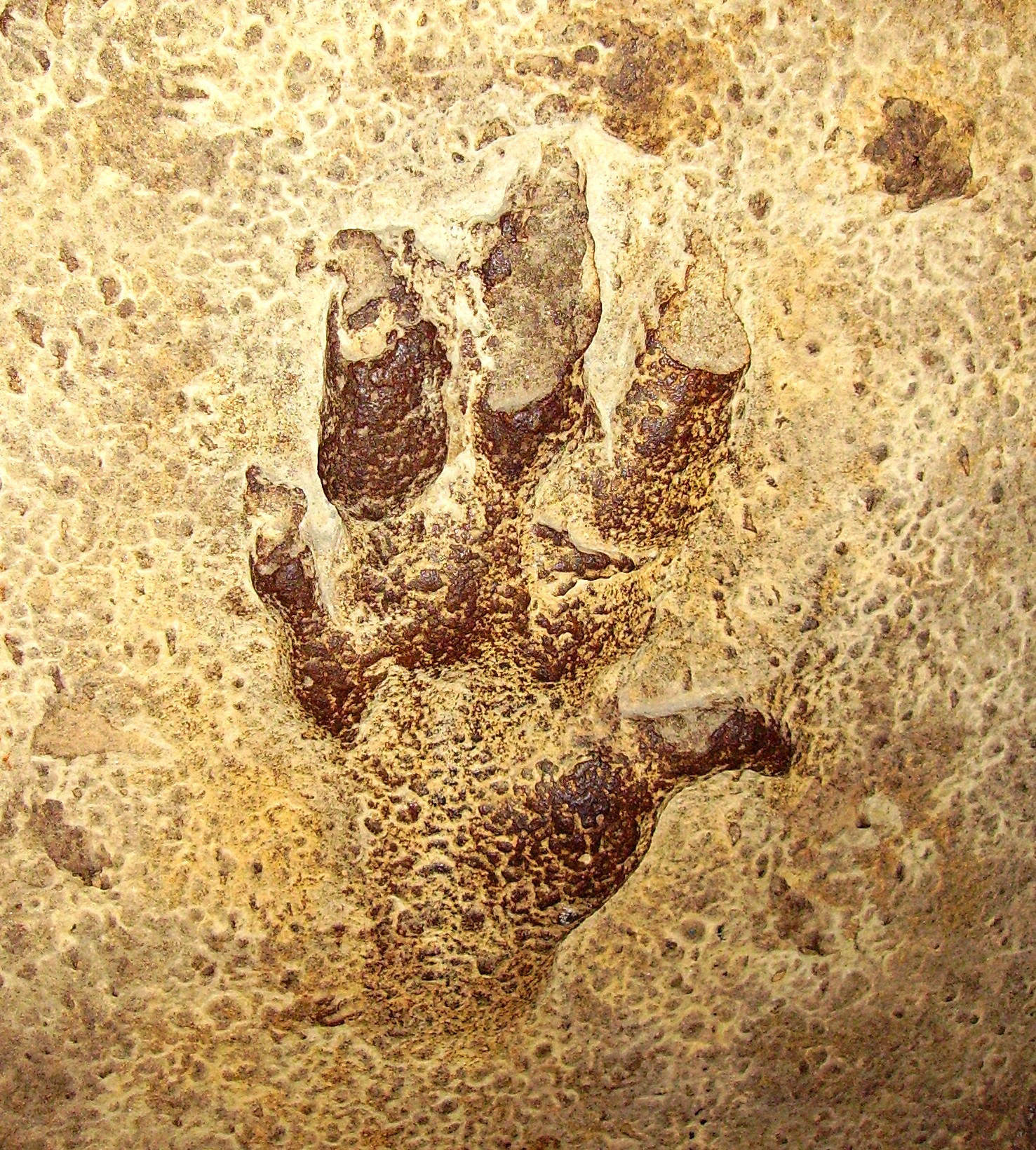
Chirotherium

- A man named Helmut Barth was building a garden house in Hildburghausen, Germany when he discovered strange, hand-shaped tracks in the sandstone he was using in the construction. Barth's discovery would be named Chirotherium by Johan Jacob Kaup.

==== 1835 ====
- While the streets of Greenfield, Massachusetts were being paved, locals noticed footprints impressed in the stone. The townspeople thought the tracks were left by turkeys. They informed James Deane, a local doctor and naturalist about the footprints. Deane found the tracks intriguing and wrote to another local scholar, Edward B. Hitchcock about the find. Hitchcock spent the rest of the summer investigating the local footprints fossils.

==== 1836 ====
- Edward Hitchcock published the results of his research into the fossil footprints. He thought the trackmakers were large flightless birds.

=== 1840s ===
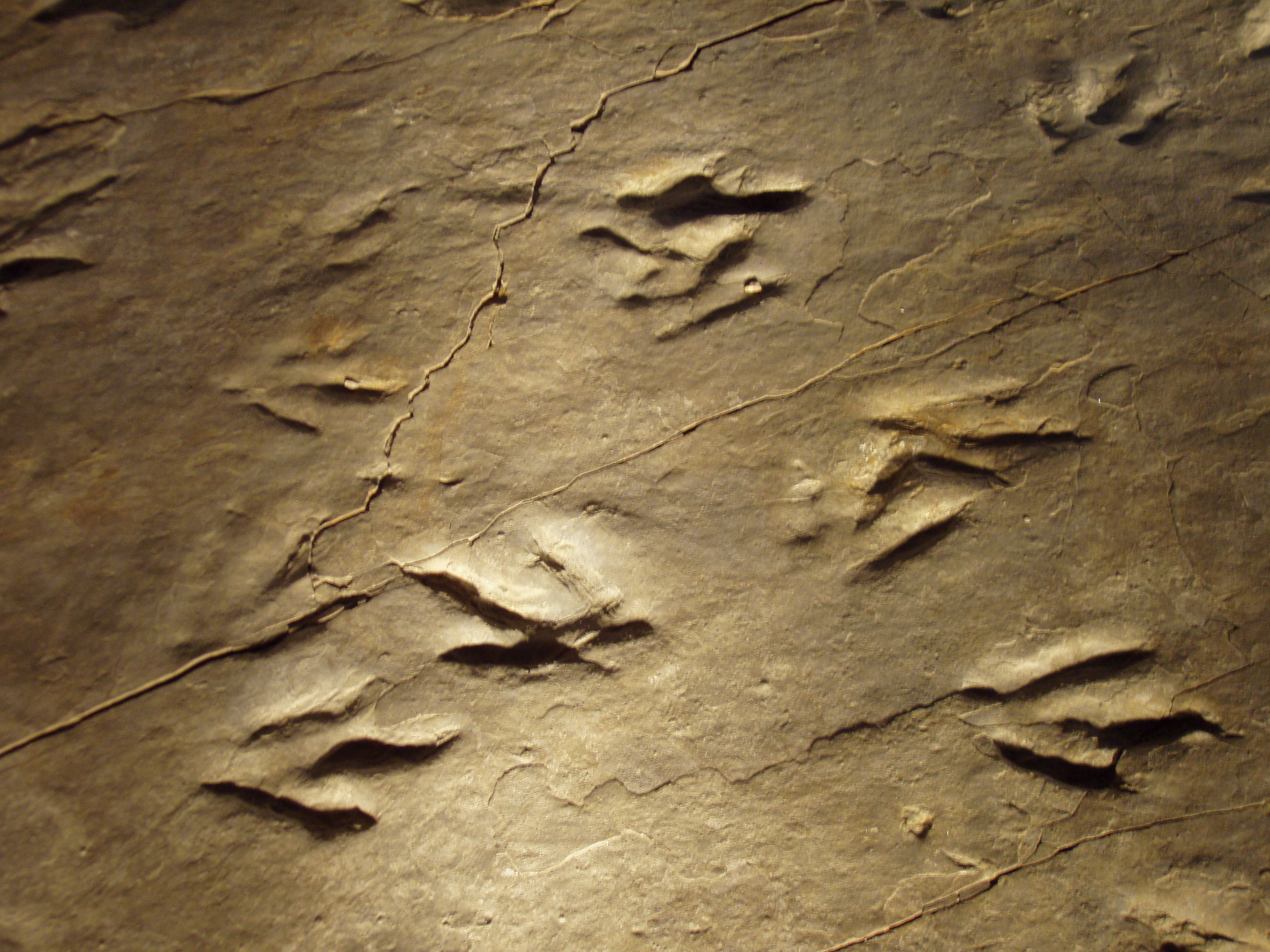
Eubrontes

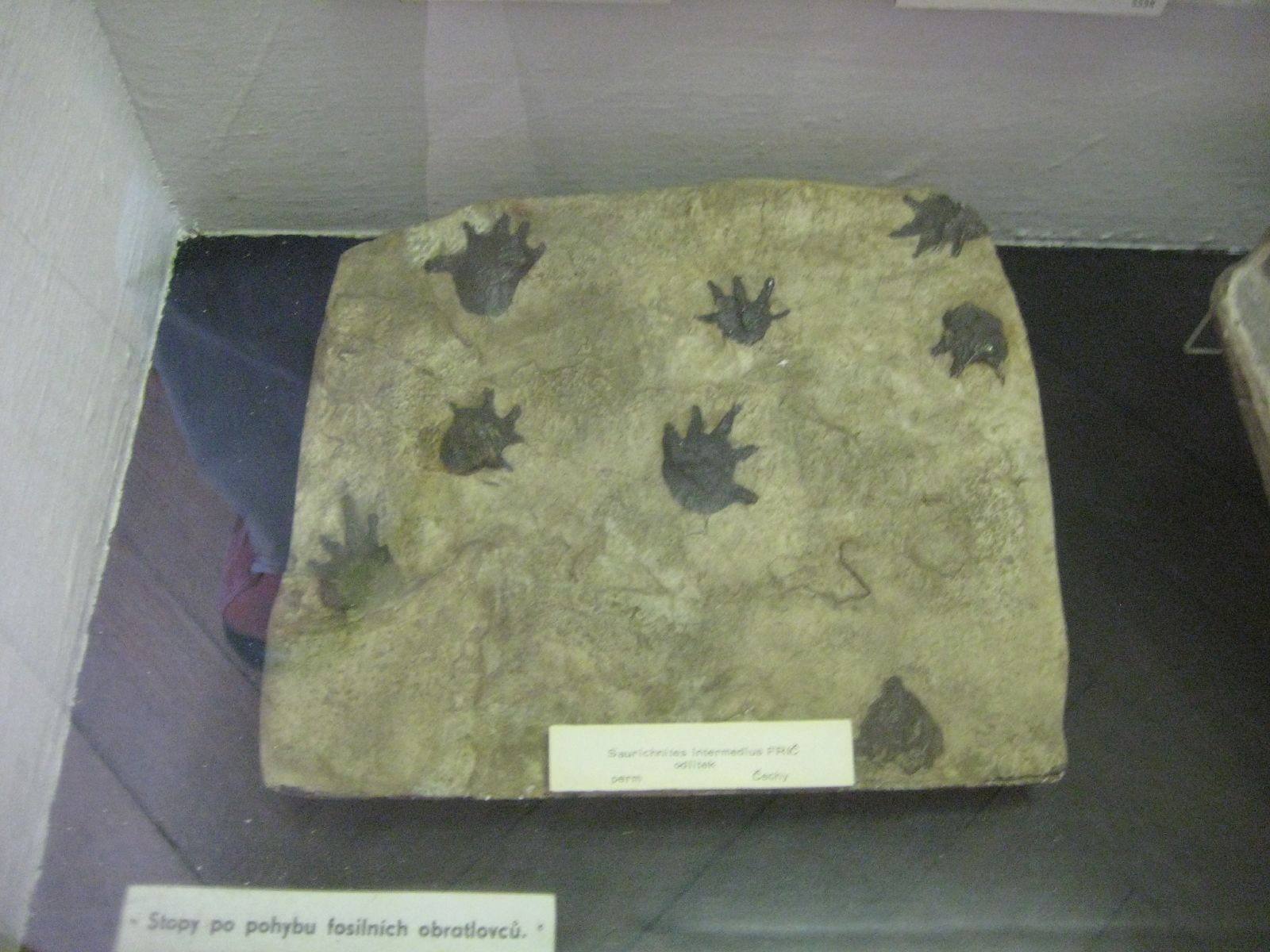
Saurichnites

==== 1842 ====
- Sir Richard Owen supported Buckland's interpretation of the Corncockle Muir tracks as tortoise tracks and named them Testudo duncani.

==== 1843 ====
- James Deane published the results of his own investigations into the fossil footprints of Massachusetts.

==== 1845 ====
- Hitchcock named the ichnogenus Eubrontes.

==== 1846 ====
- Tagart reported dinosaur tracks in England that would later come to be attributed to Iguanodon.

==== 1847 ====
- A man surnamed Cotta wrote a letter including the first documented mention of the many Permian tracks preserved in the "Rotliegendes" of central Germany's Thuringian Forest. "Rotliegendes" is German for "red layers" referring to a Permian sandstone layer rich in rusted iron minerals known elsewhere as the "New Red Sandstone". The tracks Cotta reported were later named Saurichnites cottae in his honor.

==== 1848 ====
- Hitchcock name the ichnogenus Anomoepus.

=== 1850s ===
==== 1850 ====
- Sir William Jardine argued against Owen's referral of the Corncockle Muir "tortoise" footprints to Testudo because the name applied to a specific group of modern turtles rather than to footprints. He coined the name Chelichnus, meaning "turtle track" to replace Owen's use of Testudo, but preserved the specific epithet "duncani".

==== 1851 ====
- More Permian Chelichnus tracks were discovered in the highlands of Scotland, not far from Cummingstone.
- Samuel H. Beckles began publishing research on the dinosaur footprints from the Wealden, although he did not recognize their dinosaurian origins.

==== 1852 ====
- Beckles continued to publish research on the dinosaur footprints from the Wealden.

==== 1854 ====
- Beckles continued to publish research on the dinosaur footprints from the Wealden, referring to them as Ornithoidichnites following the nomenclature devised by Edward Hitchcock for some American tracks. Despite his use of a term implying an avian trackmaker, Beckles admitted that he did not know what kind of animals made the tracks.

==== 1858 ====
- Edward Hitchcock published a summary of his research into the fossil footprints of the Connecticut Valley area. He continued to attribute the tracks to large flightless birds that he named their footprints "ornithichnites", meaning "stone bird footprints". He divided the trackmakers into two groups, the leptodactylous birds with narrow toes and the pachydactylous birds with thick toes. He also described seven new ichnospecies for the tracks he studied. He also described the ichnogenus Grallator.

=== 1860s ===
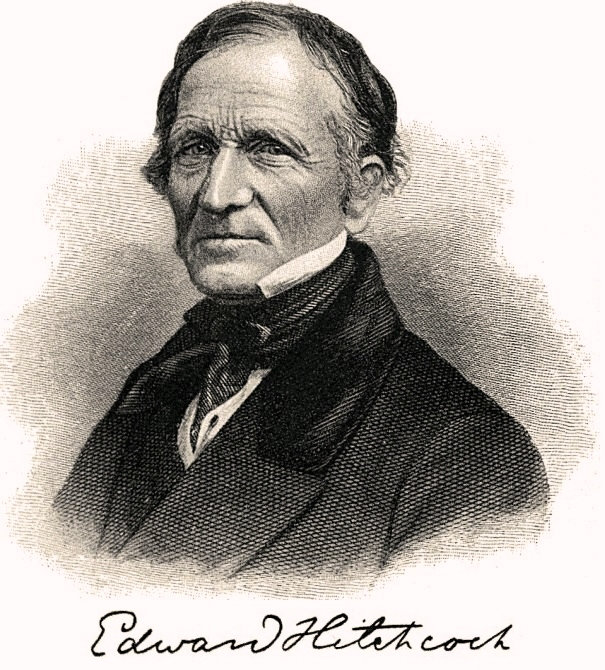
Portrait of Edward Hitchcock

==== 1860 ====
- A British scientist surnamed Williamson interpreted the Chirotherium trackmaker as a crocodile.

==== 1862 ====
- Oppel interpreted some tracks from the Solnhofen lithographic limestone as the tracks of pterosaurs.

==== 1864 ====
- Edward Hitchcock died.

==== 1865 ====
- A posthumous "supplement" to Hitchcock's monograph on the Connecticut Valley tracks was published.
- 1860: Some English dinosaur footprints were recognized as Iguanodon tracks. They were the first dinosaur tracks to be recognized as belonging to an individual genus.

=== 1870s ===
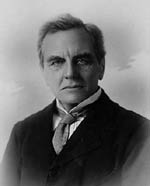
Portrait of William Johnson Sollas

==== 1877 ====
- Thomas Henry Huxley argued against Buckland and Owen's attribution of Chelichnus duncani to ancient tortoises, instead concluding that it was impossible to identify the trackmaker with the knowledge of time.

==== 1879 ====
- Some Welsh dinosaur tracks that had been previously displayed in front of the Jolly Sailor inn in Newton were acquired by the Cardiff Museum.
- T. H. Thomas reported the Welsh dinosaur footprints to the scientific literature and noted their similarity to the "Ornithichnites" of Connecticut.
- W. J. Sollas independently published a report of the Welsh dinosaur footprints.

=== 1880s ===
Location of Carson City in Nevada.

==== Early 1880s ====
- Inmates of Nevada State Prison uncovered a large Pleistocene fossil track site while excavating sandstone. The track sites was a lakeshore 50,000 years ago where familiar Ice Age animals like birds, deer, mammoths, and wolves left behind their footprints. However, ten of the roughly 50 trails seemed to have been left by an even stranger trackmaker; a sandaled giant.

==== 1880 ====
- George Le Mesle and Pierre Peron discovered dinosaur footprints in Algeria. These were the first fossil dinosaur tracks to be discovered in Africa.

==== 1884 ====
- Large theropod footprints were reported in Late Jurassic rocks at Cabo Mondego, Portugal. These may have been the first European Late Jurassic dinosaur footprints to be documented in the scientific literature.~152~
- W. P. Blake reported the fossil footprints discovered at the prison in Carson City, Nevada to the scientific literature.
- Mark Twain wrote the satirical "The Carson Fossil Footprints" attributing the purported giant tracks discovered there to primitive members of the territorial legislature.

==== 1886 ====
- A Mr. C. Pooley discovered a small five toed fossil footprint in Oxfordshire, England, which preserved in a Middle Jurassic stratigraphic unit called the Stonesfield Slate.
- John Eyerman discovered two slabs of rock preserving fossil dinosaur footprints near Milford, New Jersey. The trackmaker was probably a small, quadrupedal ornithischian dinosaur.

==== 1889 ====
- Addison Coffin drew up a map of a large portion of the Pleistocene Carson City tracks.
- Dinosaur footprints were discovered near Goldsboro, Pennsylvania. These tracks are now classified in the ichnogenus Atreipus.

=== 1890s ===
- Middle Jurassic dinosaur tracks were discovered on the Yorkshire coast of England.

==== 1894 ====
- Othniel Charles Marsh described the new ichnogenus Limnopus for Carboniferous tracks from the coal beds of Kansas.

==== 1895 ====
- A geology professor named James A. Mitchell discovered some small Grallator tracks in the Late Triassic Gettysburg Formation of Maryland. These are the first and only known dinosaur tracks in the state.

== See also ==
- History of paleontology
  - Timeline of paleontology
- Timeline of ichnology
  - 20th century in ichnology
