= Jon Stewart's 2004 appearance on Crossfire =

Television talk show segment

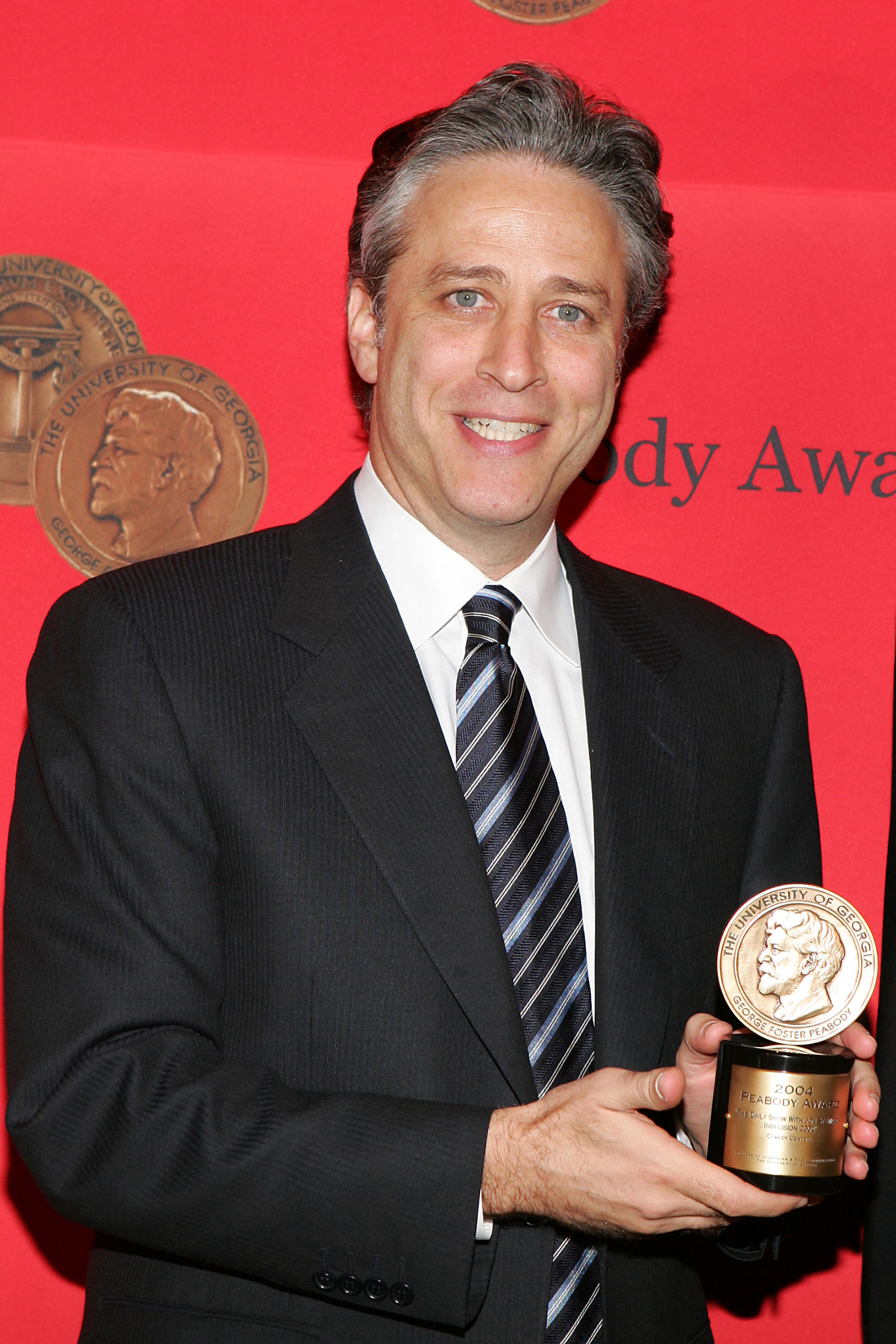
Jon Stewart in 2005, seven months after he appeared on Crossfire

On October 15, 2004, American comedian Jon Stewart appeared on CNN's Crossfire, hosted by media commentators Tucker Carlson and Paul Begala. The Daily Show, a satirical talk show hosted by Stewart, had released America (The Book): A Citizen's Guide to Democracy Inaction earlier that year; in theory, Stewart's appearance on Crossfire, a show that featured debate between left- and right-wing personalities, was intended to boost sales of the book. Instead, Stewart heavily criticized Crossfire on air; as he saw it, the show lacked nuance and was instead an outlet for partisan hackery. Both hosts pushed back on Stewart's criticisms, but Carlson in particular traded more personal blows with him, with the two insulting each other on air while Begala attempted to steer the show back on track. After the segment, Stewart went backstage with Begala to continue the conversation in a calmer manner.

The tape and transcript of the segment broke into wide circulation, impacting all three men involved. Three months after the appearance, Crossfire was cancelled and Carlson was fired; (Note: Carlson disputed this account, claiming that he had quit in April 2004 but had planned to continue hosting for the length of his contract.) commentators differ as to how impactful it actually was, but generally agree that Stewart was at least part of the reason. Carlson was dogged by the incident in subsequent years of his career, and some in the press speculate that humiliation from the incident motivated him to rise to prominence in cable news. Stewart found success from the incident: observers – including the president of CNN, critics in the press, and liberals on the internet – largely agreed with his points, significantly raising his status and profile in the American political sphere. Begala's role in the incident was largely pushed to the wayside, although he has reflected positively on Stewart. Stewart has expressed regrets over the segment, but has continued to trade insults with Carlson in the years following it.

== Appearance ==
Daily Show executive producer Steve Bodow later told The New York Times that the actual events of the segment were unplanned. However, fellow executive producer Ben Karlin said in the same piece that he and Stewart had discussed, in the car ride to the studio, whether Stewart was going to criticize Crossfire on-air. Karlin also wrote that the Daily Show writers' room had, at the time, regularly joked derogatorily about Crossfire.

=== On-air ===
Tucker Carlson: "Wait, I thought you were gonna be funny."
Jon Stewart: "No, I'm not gonna be your monkey."

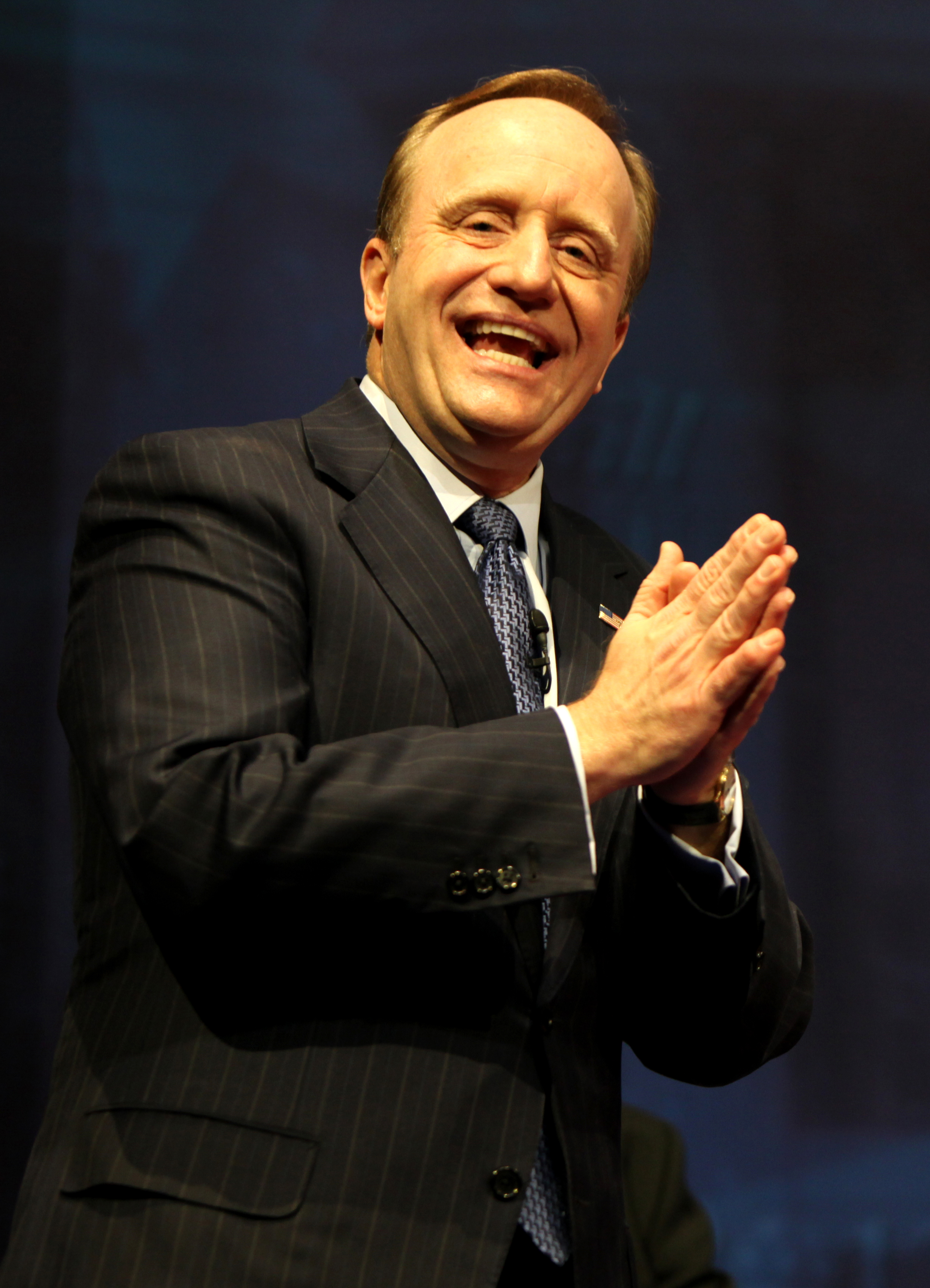
Paul Begala

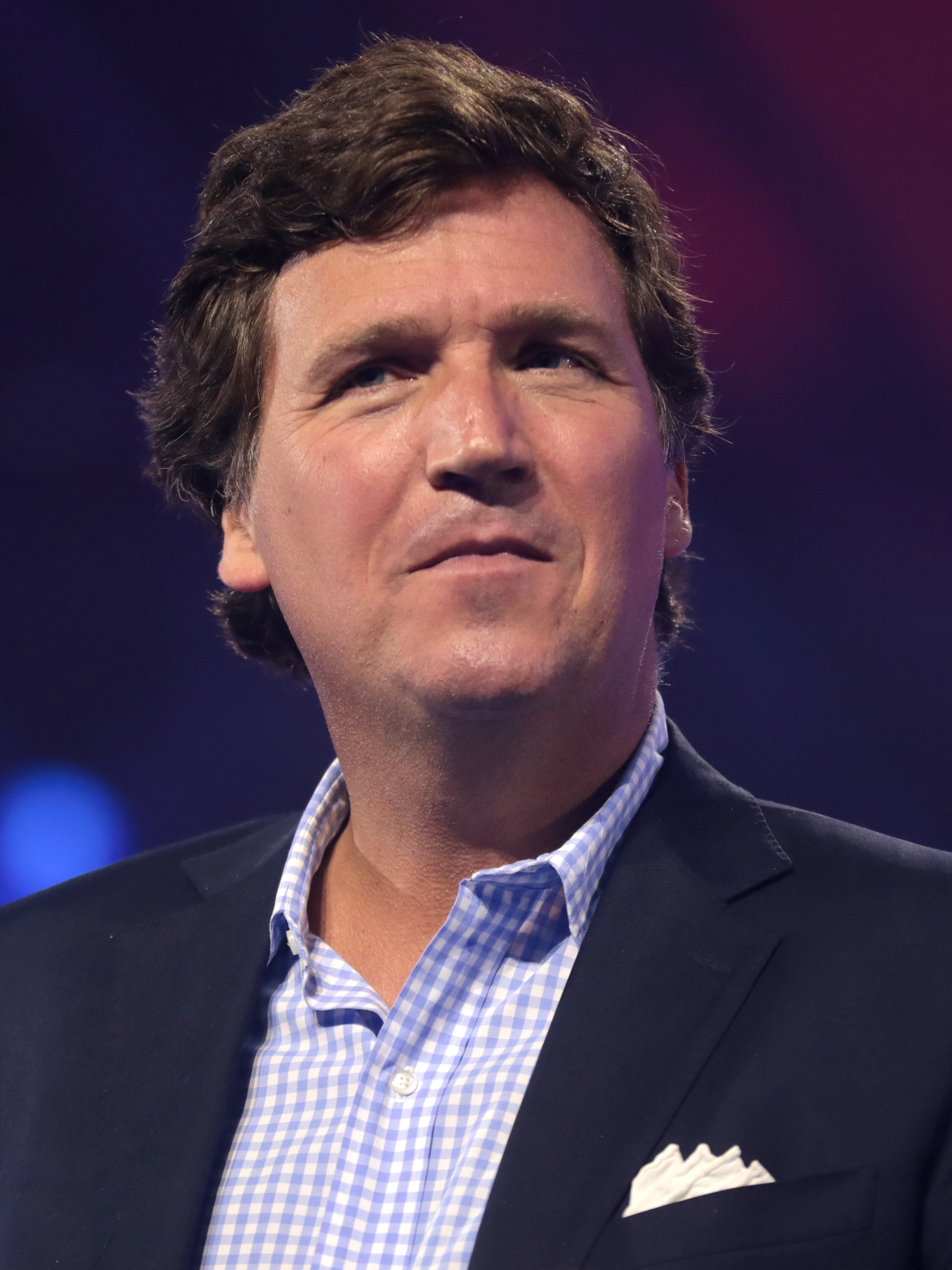
Tucker Carlson

The hosts of Crossfire

Stewart had caustic words for the show, portraying it as a place where partisan hacks took nuanced issues and turned them into two-sided exchanges of talking points. To Stewart's point that the show was, as he said, "hurting America", Begala responded that Crossfire was by design a debate show; Stewart responded in turn that such an assertion was "like saying pro wrestling is a show about athletic competition." Carlson pushed back, highlighting a recent Stewart interview of John Kerry (then the Democratic nominee for president) with what Carlson considered soft questions such as "is it hard not to take the attacks personally?". Stewart demurred, highlighting his role as a satirist rather than a journalist.

Stewart's criticism of the show featured several exchanges of personal jabs between him and Tucker Carlson, with Begala attempting to mediate. In the final exchange before a commercial break, Carlson remarked that he thought Stewart was "more fun on your show, just my opinion." Stewart responded, "You know what's interesting, though? You're as big a dick on your show as you are on any show."

=== Post-segment ===
Paul Begala, writing an opinion piece for CNN in 2015, recalled that after the segment was finished, Stewart went backstage with him (along with an executive producer from each of their shows) to more calmly continue the discussion of the criticisms Stewart had tried to outline on air. Begala said he agreed with some of those points, but challenged his alternative vision.

== Aftermath ==
=== Reaction ===
The segment quickly entered broad circulation – that episode of Crossfire beat the previous month's average viewership by over 250,000, for a total of 867,000 on-air watchers. In addition, transcripts and clips of the episode were spread widely over the internet, which Michael Schaffer of Politico notes predated the rise of later social media giants such as YouTube. Writing for NPR in 2006, Paul Boutin counted the segment as one of the viral clips which helped YouTube gain popularity in its first year. In 2022, Gordon Devin of The Atlantic termed it "one of the first truly viral political videos of this century".

Gordon Devin later called Stewart "the champion by first-round knockout". Some analyses contended that the segment reflected Stewart's independence from Crossfire's place in the media ecosystem, a place that served as a part of the political system that Stewart criticized as a whole – thereby explaining part of Carlson's outrage. In a 2023 analysis, Michael Schaffer argued that echo chambers of partisan agreement replaced Crossfire's partisan disagreement for the worse.

=== Impact ===
On January 5, 2005, CNN President Jon Klein announced that the network had cut ties with Tucker Carlson and would be cancelling Crossfire. Klein explicitly cited Stewart's on-air criticism of Crossfire as a factor in the network's decision, commenting, "I agree wholeheartedly with Jon's overall premise". Commentators differ with respect to Stewart's impact on the show's demise, but generally agree that he played a role. Stewart himself took credit, quipping on his show, "I had no idea that if you wanted to cancel a show, all you had to do was say it out loud."

The incident is considered in retrospect a defining moment in Jon Stewart's television career. As Gordon Devin described it, Stewart was catapulted "into a position of political influence and superstardom that few comics in America have ever reached"; writers for The New York Times agreed, reflecting that the segment and its reaction "solidified Mr. Stewart's status as cable news's most prominent critic." Stewart would become a focal point for Democrats in the remaining years of the Bush administration.

Some in the press speculate that the incident humiliated Carlson into changing his persona and rising to prominence in cable news, going on to host a show that outperformed The Daily Show in the ratings. Exchanges between Carlson and Stewart in the decades after the segment led commentators to conclude that Carlson was still smarting from it, and it has periodically been recalled and reshared with Carlson's appearances in the news cycle, including when he was fired from Fox News. Begala's role in the incident has been largely forgotten, with contemporary media emphasizing the dispute as between Stewart and Carlson.

=== Reflections ===
Jon Stewart
(@jonstewart)
tweeted:

I called Tucker Carlson a dick on National television. It's high time I apologize...to dicks. Never should have lumped you in with that terrible terrible person.

March 11, 2021

Paul Begala later told The New York Times that "it worked out for [Stewart]. In my life, it doesn't make my Top 100 list of bad days." In his opinion piece for CNN, he repeated his statement from the top of the segment that Stewart "is both the smartest funnyman on TV and the funniest smart man on TV."

Stewart told The Washington Post later that October that he "probably should have been more delicate", but defended his original contention about Crossfire. Daily Show executive producer Ben Karlin said in 2015 that Stewart felt bad about the way the segment had transpired. In 2021, Stewart issued a sarcastic apology to Carlson on Twitter, amid a controversy over comments Carlson had made on his show.

== See also ==
- Jon Stewart–Jim Cramer conflict
- Barack Obama–Donald Trump encounter
