= Mad Money =

American syndicated investing TV show

- Original logo
- Genre: Talk show Finance; Investment
- Presented by: Jim Cramer
- Country of origin: United States
- Original language: English

Production
- Executive producer: Regina Gilgan
- Production locations: CNBC headquarters, Englewood Cliffs, New Jersey (2005–2022); New York Stock Exchange Building (2022–present)
- Running time: 60 minutes

Original release
- Network: CNBC
- Release: March 14, 2005 – present

Mad Money is an American finance television program hosted by Jim Cramer that began airing on CNBC on March 14, 2005. Its main focus is investment and speculation, particularly in public company stocks. Mad Money replaced Bullseye, a news and finance program, taking its 6 p.m. Eastern Time slot.

Mad Money was originally taped at CNBC's headquarters in Englewood Cliffs, New Jersey. A new studio set debuted in 2022, at the New York Stock Exchange Building. Since 2006, Mad Money has also conducted "Back to School" events, in which the show travels to universities across the United States. Special broadcasts, including the "Back to School" episodes, typically feature a live audience.

== Program features ==
Mad Money host Jim Cramer, a former hedge fund manager, provides the viewer with tips and recommendations regarding the stock market and investing. He researches a number of stocks each week and discusses them on the program. Cramer does not own the stocks recommended on the show, and he urges the viewer to do their own research regarding his advice. A lengthy disclaimer also appears early on in the program. Other onscreen information includes stock charts and facts. Guest interviews with executives are a common feature of the show.

Cramer defines "mad money" as the money one "can use to invest in stocks ... not retirement money, which you want in 401K or an Individual retirement account, a savings account, bonds, or the most conservative of dividend-paying stocks."

Cramer frequently says on the show, "Other people want to make friends . . . I just want to make you money. My job is not just to entertain you but to educate you." To make Mad Money entertaining, Cramer used numerous gimmicks in the early years of the show, including costumes and props. Examples of the latter included an oil painting and bobblehead figures both of himself, as well as miniature figurines of bulls and bears, a reference to the stock market terms "bull market" and "bear market". Cramer would sometimes throw the figurines at the camera or torture them in various ways, such as cooking them, and he occasionally decapitated his bobbleheads in frustration.

Cramer has a panel of oversized red buttons, which activate various sound effects and onscreen graphics, including those related to bulls and bears. The soundboard originated in the radio show Jim Cramer's Real Money, which preceded Mad Money. The show also features heavy metal music at times.

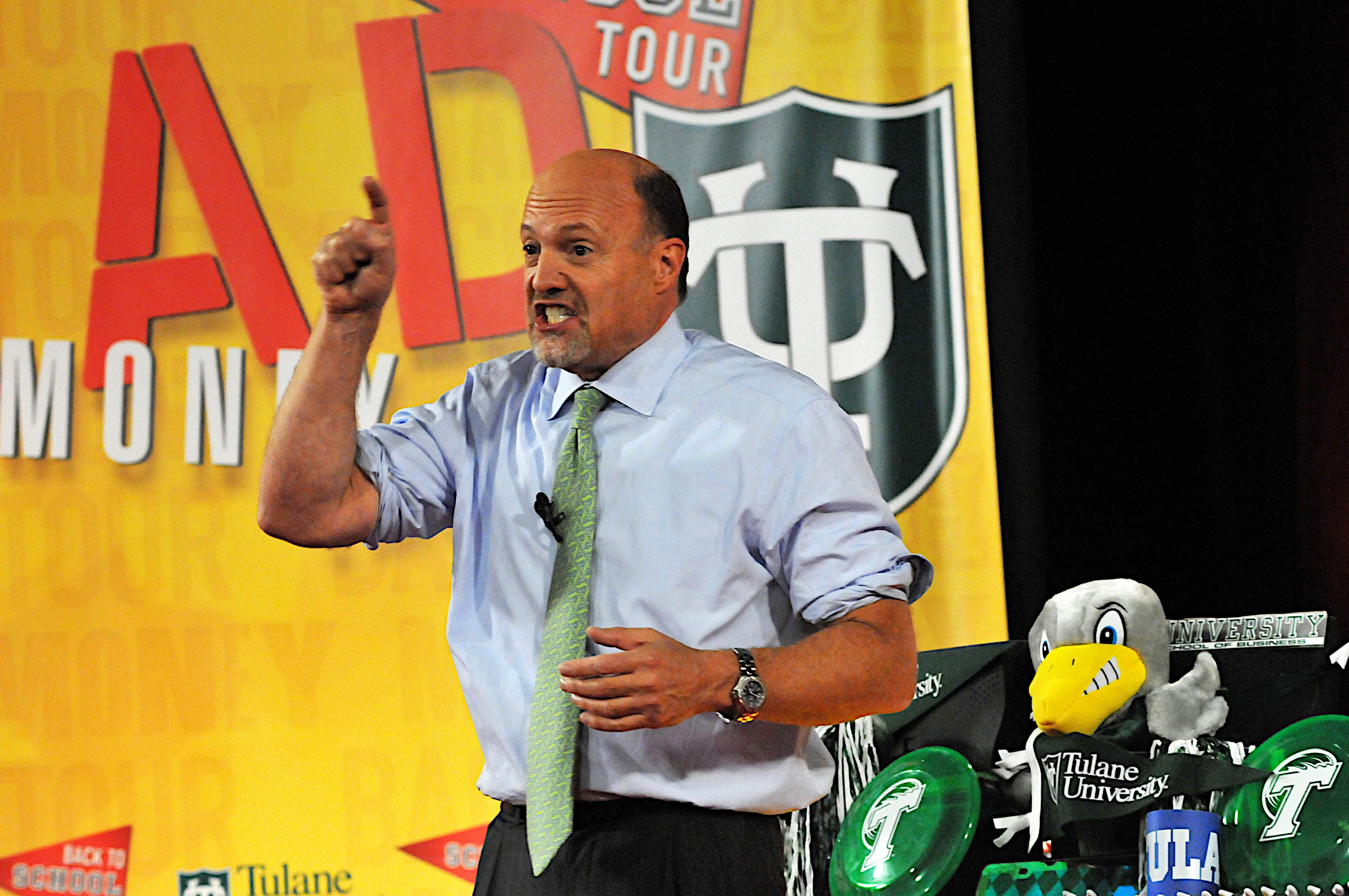
Host Jim Cramer during a Mad Money "Back to School" event in 2010

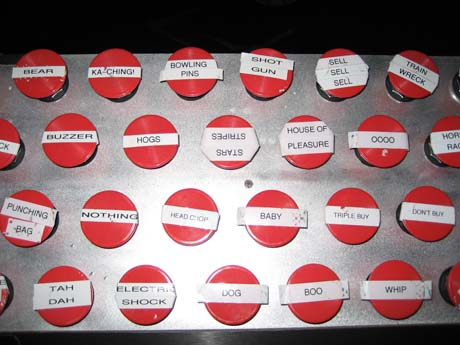
Close-up of Cramer's soundboard

In a 2006 episode, Cramer had a monkey named Ka-ching make an appearance on the show. Ka-ching wore a CNBC T-shirt, sat in Cramer's chair, pressed the sound-effect buttons, and threw the bull figurines around the set. By 2008, Cramer had added a new prop in the form of an Uncle Ben's rice box, but with an image of Ben Bernanke, who was serving as Chair of the Federal Reserve at the time; Cramer was a critic of Bernanke, believing that he contributed to the 2008 financial crisis.

Forbes, in 2005, wrote that Mad Money "amounts to Cramer being Cramer--as raw and uncensored as ever. He feverishly bounces around the studio, rants at the camera and bangs on buttons blaring the sound effects of cash registers and bowling pins, growling bears and raging bulls." Cramer himself wrote of the show in 2007: "I say stupid things, yell 'Booyah' with alarming frequency, and occasionally wear a diaper or jump into a pile of lettuce to illustrate the finer points of investing."

Various Mad Money props

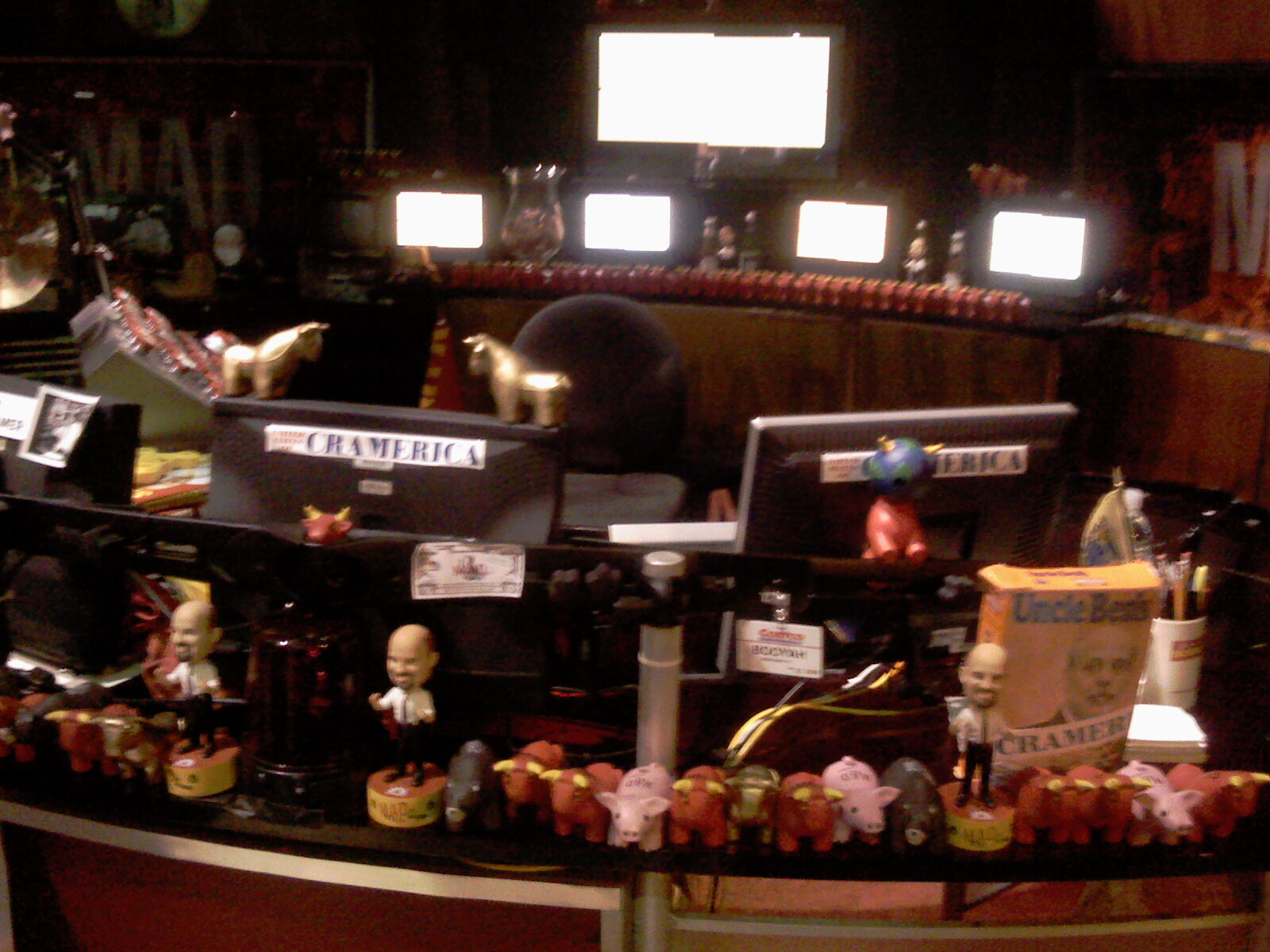

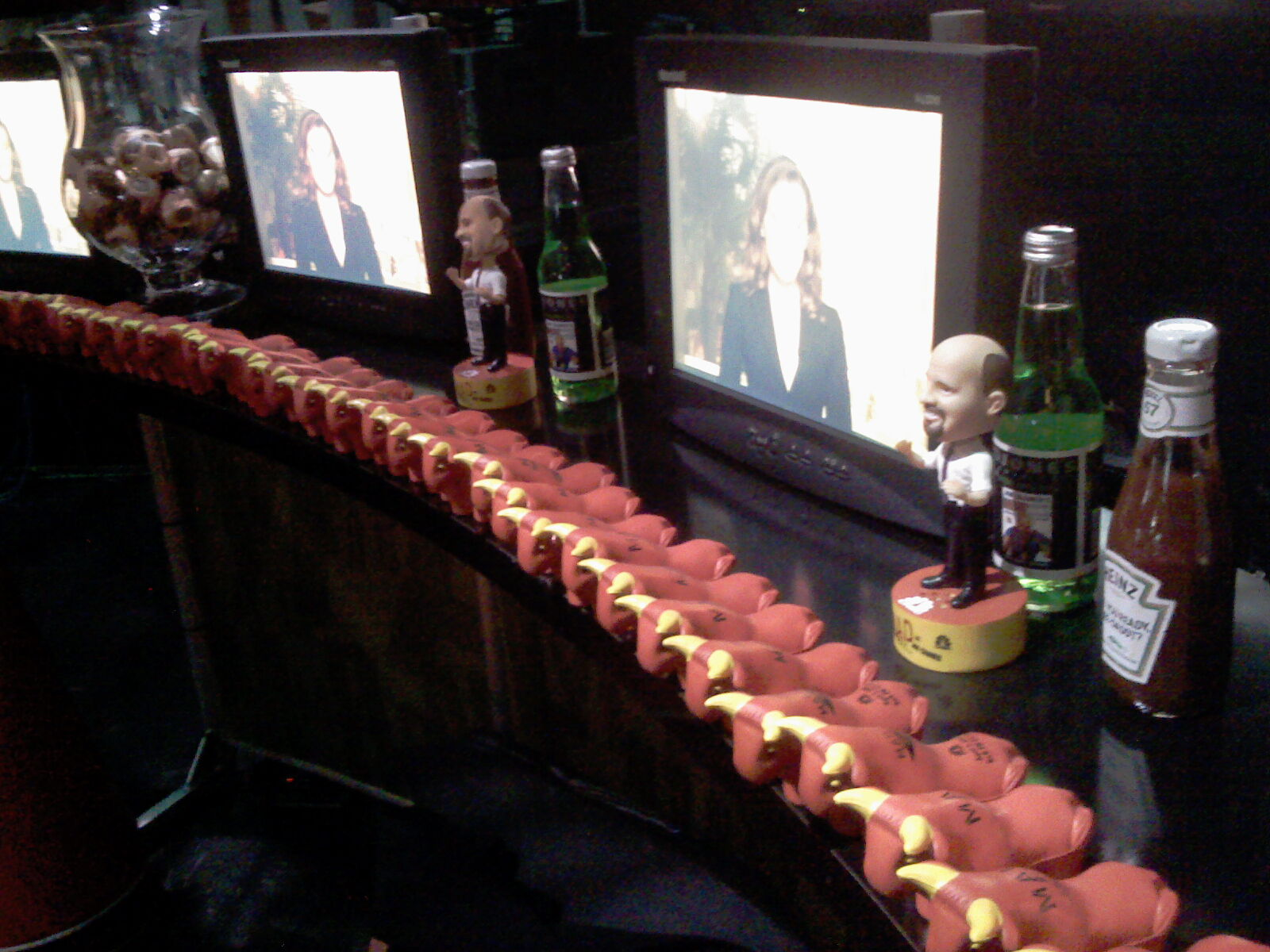

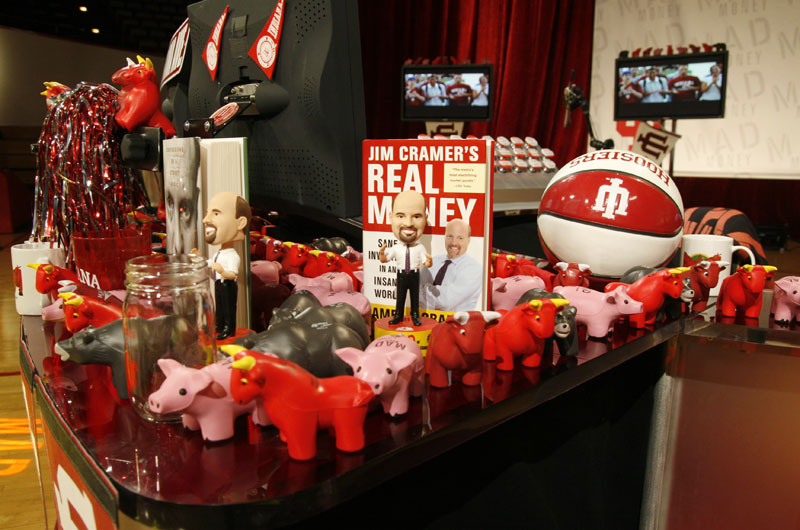

=== Segments ===
Mad Money has featured various segments, the most prominent one being the Lightning Round, which occurs near the end of the program. During this segment, viewers call in to the show and ask Cramer about whether to buy or sell a particular stock. Cramer keeps track of more than 1,000 stocks, and this knowledge is used during the Lightning Round as he offers instant and brief assessments to each caller. These quick assessments are based on Cramer's prior knowledge of the stock, rather than new research. The Lightning Round is played until a buzzer sounds off.

Cramer hates chairs, believing that they encourage laziness. He did not have a chair at his hedge fund, and he generally avoids using one on Mad Money, saying, "I believe that you should be standing at all times – standing over people, watching things, moving, staying in motion. I never like to be tethered." During the first two years of the show, Cramer would start off the Lightning Round by throwing an office chair against the wall of his studio set, damaging the wall on several occasions. Around late 2006, Cramer stopped throwing chairs in order to make time for more calls, and to stop straining his back.

On February 25, 2008, Cramer introduced an online-only version dubbed Lightning Round Overtime, viewable on the program's website. This feature had additional stock picks that were not seen on the television broadcast. Lightning Round Overtime was eliminated in July 2011.

Other segments have included:

- Am I Diversified?: A weekly segment in which Cramer reviews five stocks in each caller's portfolio and suggests how they might consider enhancing their diversification.
- Sell Block: Another weekly segment in which Cramer informs the viewer of which stocks to sell.
- Mad Mail: Cramer answers viewer emails.
- Market Game Plan: A weekly segment that airs on Fridays where Cramer goes over the most important market events that impacts the following trading week.

=== Catchphrases ===
Various catchphrases are used on Mad Money, including "Booyah", said by Cramer and his callers as a form of greeting. It was previously used on Cramer's radio show, and the term's popularity led to it becoming part of Mad Money. Cramer later said "I had felt that we had left it behind when we had moved to TV. But there were too many people who listened to the radio show, it was a very popular radio show, that it became part of the TV show." He explained the term's origin in 2005: "Here's what happened: A guy calls me on my radio show, and he says 'You made me a 100 smackers on K-Mart – a hundred points...' – he's from New Orleans – '...and we have one word for that down here and it's booyah. Then the next guy calls and he says 'you know you made me a lot of money on [a stock] so: booyah!' And now they all say it. It's not my rap".. On occasion, a viewer will ask "Hey Jim, how's mama doin'?" to which Cramer replies "Mama doin' fine".

Cramer begins the program by introducing himself: "Hey, I'm Cramer!" A common catchphrase, used by Cramer to start the Lightning Round, is "Are you ready, skee-daddy?" Another common saying is: "Bulls make money. Bears make money. Hogs get slaughtered." The term "Cramerica" has also been used on Mad Money, with fans of the show referred to as "Cramericans". Cramer ends the program by stating, "There's always a bull market somewhere".

== Production ==
Cramer had previously co-hosted the CNBC program Kudlow & Cramer (2002–2005) alongside Larry Kudlow. Cramer said, "It was a traditional sort of financial-news and stock-picking show, and it did all right." Mad Money was conceived by Susan Krakower, who served as CNBC's interim head of prime-time programming. She liked Cramer's enthusiasm and thought he was ill-fitted for the calm, professional format used in Kudlow & Cramer. Upon learning that he also had a syndicated radio show, she sent a film crew to capture footage of the program. After viewing it, she became convinced that Cramer had potential for his own television program, saying "he had to be put in the right environment and he had to be opened up." Krakower contacted Cramer and pitched her idea, but did not hear back from him after that, prompting her to track him down. Cramer is a sports fan, and according to Krakower, "I finally told him I want to create the 'SportsCenter' of financial shows. That got him going."

Cramer himself, speaking of Kudlow & Cramer, later acknowledged that he wanted to move on and do "a different kind of show—one that still gave me a way to point people to great stocks but also allowed me to express my innate insanity, in all its glory, to everyone who might be interested." The idea for Mad Money was pitched to NBC Entertainment president Jeff Zucker, who, according to Cramer, greenlit the project despite "the objections of just about everyone at CNBC". Cramer left Kudlow & Cramer in January 2005 to develop the program that would become Mad Money. It premiered on March 14, 2005, replacing Bullseye, a news and finance program. Early in the show's run, Cramer would become exhausted while taping and would also wear out his voice, prompting him to begin a physical fitness routine and to take voice lessons.

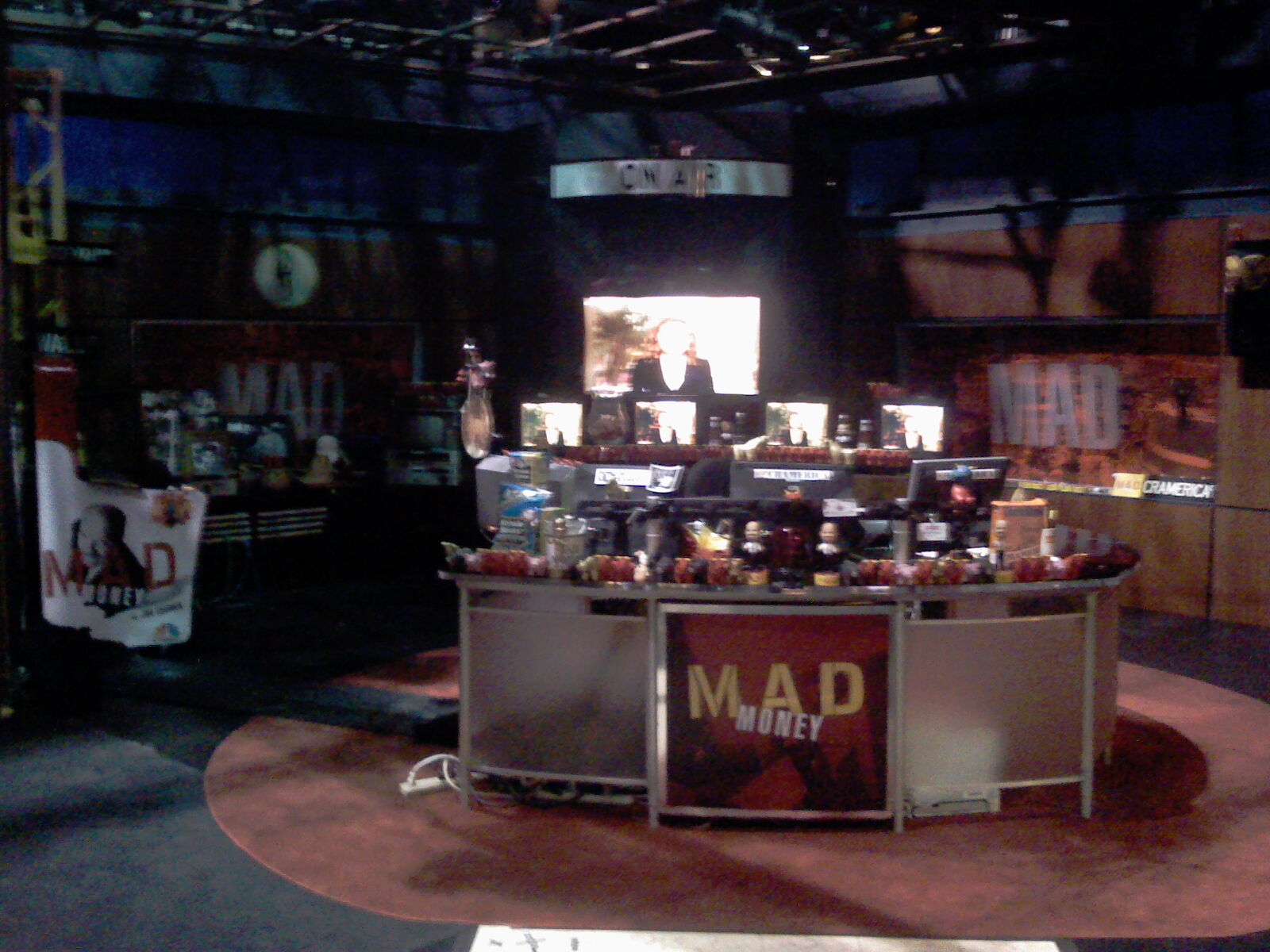
The original Mad Money set in 2008, before its redesign five years later

Cramer is the show's editorial director, deciding which stocks to discuss. Regina Gilgan, who has been with Mad Money since its premiere, had become the executive producer by 2007, replacing Krakower. Another major crew member since the show's first year was head writer Cliff Mason, Cramer's nephew. Cramer said in 2007 that "some of the show's best moments come out of the two of us competing to produce more and more surreal, ridiculous one-liners." Cramer devises "the ideas and the serious content", then writes an early draft "with as much smart and funny stuff" as he can in his spare time. He and Mason then exchanged drafts before settling on a final version, which was written after the stock market closes at 4:00 p.m. Eastern Time. Mason remained head writer until his death in 2026.

Taping of the show occurs from 4:30 to 5:30, for broadcasting from 6:00 to 7:00. The program is shot with a Steadicam, and was broadcast for the first time in 1080i HD on August 4, 2014. The show's heavy metal score was composed by Willie Wilcox. Krakower said that the Lightning Round "from the music to the lights to the camera angles is straight out of WWE."

Mad Money was originally taped at CNBC's headquarters in Englewood Cliffs, New Jersey. The show's studio set remained the same until April 23, 2013, when a redesign of the original was unveiled. Plans to build a completely new set at the New York Stock Exchange Building were conceived in December 2021, with construction beginning four months later. The new set debuted on July 18, 2022.

== Special broadcasts ==
Mad Money has featured special broadcasts, typically with live audiences. These include the "Main Event" series (2005–06) and "Back to School" events (since 2006).

=== "Main Event" series ===
The first Mad Money "Main Event" was broadcast on July 20, 2005. The featured guest on the show was New York attorney general Eliot Spitzer, a classmate of Cramer at Harvard Law School. During the "Main Event", Cramer introduced a new segment titled "Am I Nuts?" in which he wore a doctor coat and spoke to audience members about the health of their stock portfolio.

"Main Event II" premiered on October 26, 2005, with a 100-person audience and businessman Donald Trump as a special guest. "Main Event III" was broadcast on November 30, 2005, and featured Mel Karmazin, CEO of Sirius Satellite Radio. "Main Event IV" premiered on January 11, 2006, with guest Les Moonves, CEO of CBS. The fifth and final "Main Event" was broadcast on July 12, 2006, with Zucker as the featured guest.

=== "Back to School" events ===
Early on, Mad Money became especially popular among college students. On February 1, 2006, the show launched a "Back to School" tour, traveling to universities across the United States. The first episode was broadcast from Harvard University, Cramer's alma mater, and again featured Spitzer as a guest.

Subsequent "Back to School" tours and events were held in 2007, 2008, 2009, 2010, 2013, and 2023. Like regular episodes, guest executives are also commonly featured during "Back to School" broadcasts.

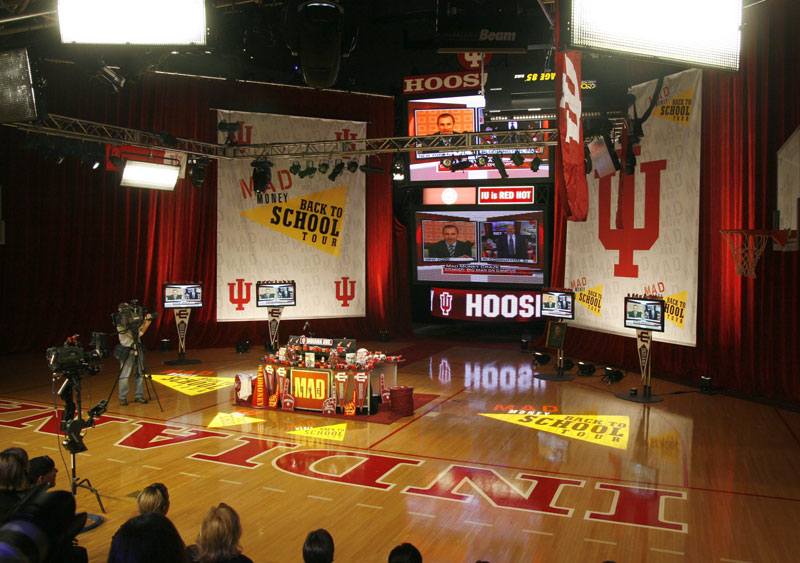
"Back to School" tour at Indiana University, 2007

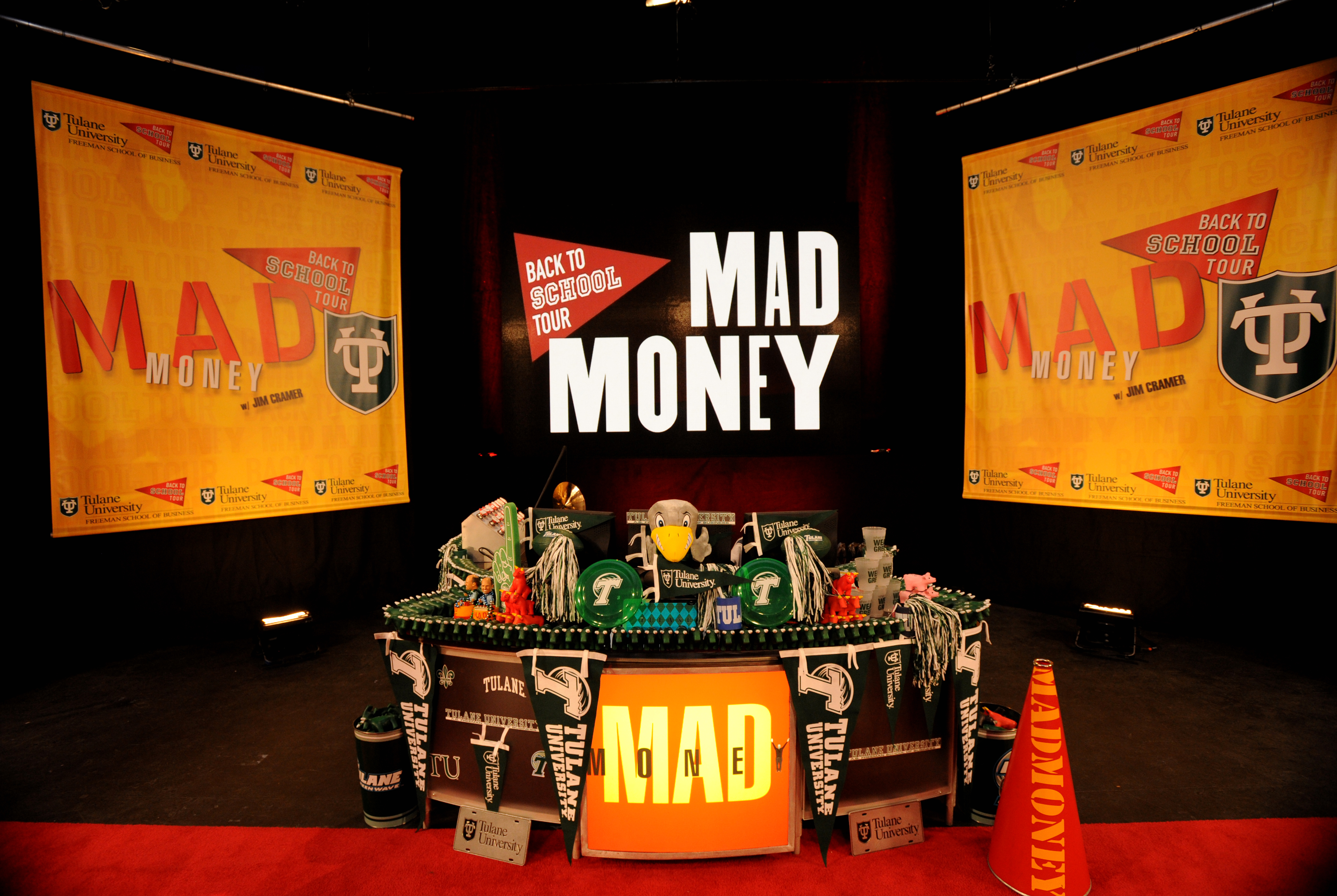
A "Back to School" event at Tulane University, 2010

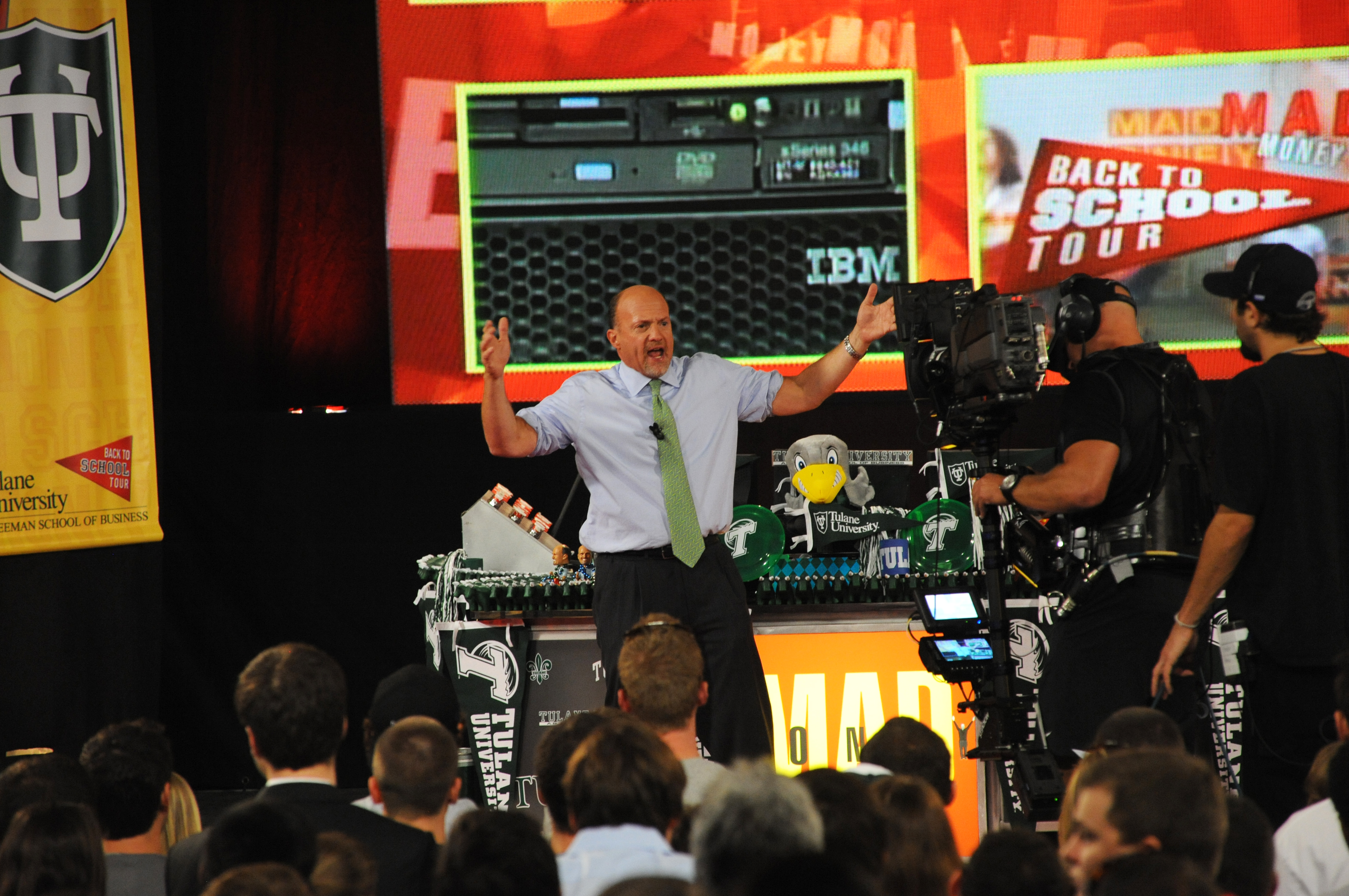
Cramer at Tulane

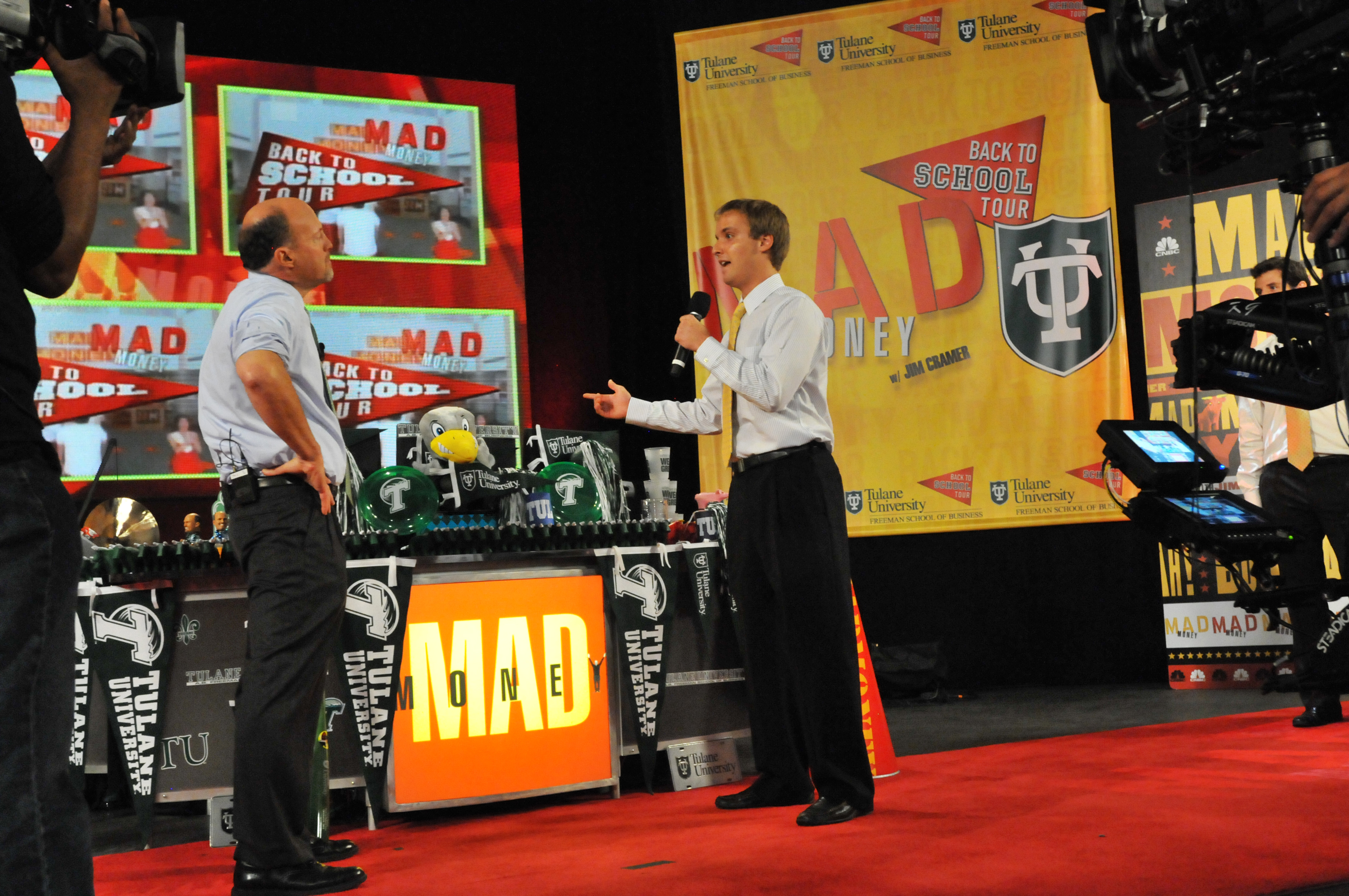
Cramer and an audience member at Tulane

=== Other notable episodes ===
Mad Money aired its first-anniversary episode on March 14, 2006, with a mix of stock questions and clips from previous episodes. Other anniversary episodes have followed since then. The third anniversary special included a live audience, as did the fifth anniversary, the latter broadcast from Studio 8H in New York City. "MMX", a special episode to celebrate the 10th anniversary, was taped from the show's studio set in front of a live audience and aired on March 12, 2015. A 20th anniversary special aired on April 29, 2025.

Special episodes have also been broadcast to commemorate other milestones. The 500th episode of Mad Money aired on June 11, 2007, and featured memorable clips from throughout the show, as well as viewer call-ins and stock questions. The 1,000th episode aired on April 8, 2009, and the Mad Money staff surprised Cramer by having several unexpected guests join the show by phone, including Trump, Google chief executive Eric Schmidt, and football coach Andy Reid. The 2,000th episode of Mad Money aired on October 1, 2013, and was taped outside the New York Stock Exchange Building in front of a live audience. Cramer was presented with a replica of his 1978 Ford Fairmont, which he lived in during financial hardship earlier in his life.

== Reception and impact ==
Mad Money quickly developed a loyal following after its premiere, and brokerage firms began to include Cramer's stock advice in their research notes. The term "Cramer Effect" was coined during the show's first year, in reference to a stock's price rising the day after being recommended on the show. Journalist Michael Wolff, a friend of Cramer, said of his on-screen antics in 2006: "He's irresistible to watch. There's a kind of poetry when he talks about the market. And part of the fun is the possibility that you're watching a train wreck." Bill Alpert of Barron's wrote of the Lightning Round, "It's dazzling -- a display of Cramer's freakish ability to remember something about thousands of stocks."

Financial experts have been critical of Cramer's approach and advice on the show. Joseph Nocera, a business columnist at The New York Times, opined in 2006 that the people who are watching Mad Money and following Cramer's advice are "fools", writing further, "It's great theater and it's great television, but it's not great investing." Businessman Henry Blodget, writing for Slate in 2007, criticized Cramer for overstating his abilities as a market forecaster, noting that his suggested 2006 portfolio lost money "despite nearly every major equity market on earth being up between about 15% and 30%". However, Blodget wrote that Cramer's behavior on Mad Money made for "mesmerizing reality TV". Based on a 2010 analysis of Cramer's advice, author Frank Partnoy wrote, "Mad Money is entertaining, but its recommendations won't make you rich."

=== Ratings ===
CNBC's overall television ratings had fallen in the years before Mad Money debuted. The show averaged 170,000 daily viewers during its premiere week. By August 2005, Mad Money averaged 200,000 daily viewers and had become the second highest-rated program on CNBC, in what used to be its second lowest-rated time slot. "Main Event II" earned a new record of 339,000 viewers. By the end of 2005, Mad Money had 463,000 daily viewers. In the midst of the Great Recession, ratings reached 427,000 average viewers in September 2008, nearly doubling its viewership from weeks earlier. This occurred shortly after the bankruptcy of Lehman Brothers, the federal bailout of American International Group, and the sale of Merrill Lynch.

== In popular culture ==
Mad Money has made appearances in several films and television shows. Examples of the latter include Arrested Development and 30 Rock. Mad Money was licensed for a brief fictional segment in the 2008 film Iron Man. In the segment, shortly after the character Tony Stark declares Stark Industries will no longer manufacture weapons, Cramer is shown on Mad Money advising people in his trademark flair to sell off stock in the company.

A comedy film, also titled Mad Money, was released in 2008, and includes an appearance from Cramer on his program. He also appeared alongside the stars of the film to ring the opening bell of the New York Stock Exchange, two days ahead of the film's release.

In the animated television series South Park, Mad Money is spoofed as a podcast called Mad Friends in the 2010 episode "You Have 0 Friends". Mad Money makes another appearance in the 2010 film Wall Street: Money Never Sleeps. Character Jacob Moore spreads rumors about the nationalization of an African oil field, Hydra Offshore, and Cramer advises his viewers to sell their stock.

Mad Money is among topics covered in I Love the 2000s, a 2014 television compilation of highlights from the decade.

Money Monster, a 2016 film, focuses on a flamboyant financial television host and his crew being taken hostage by an upset investor, who lost his life savings on a bad stock recommendation. The film received comparisons to Cramer and Mad Money, although director Jodie Foster and star George Clooney denied any connection.

Since at least 2022, Mad Money has occasionally been referenced on the comedy talk show Last Week Tonight with John Oliver.

== See also ==
- Fast Money, a CNBC financial investing program, hosted by Melissa Lee, which follows a similar format
- Jon Stewart–Jim Cramer conflict
- Squawk on the Street, a CNBC business news program that features Cramer's "Stop Trading!" segment
- TheStreet.com
