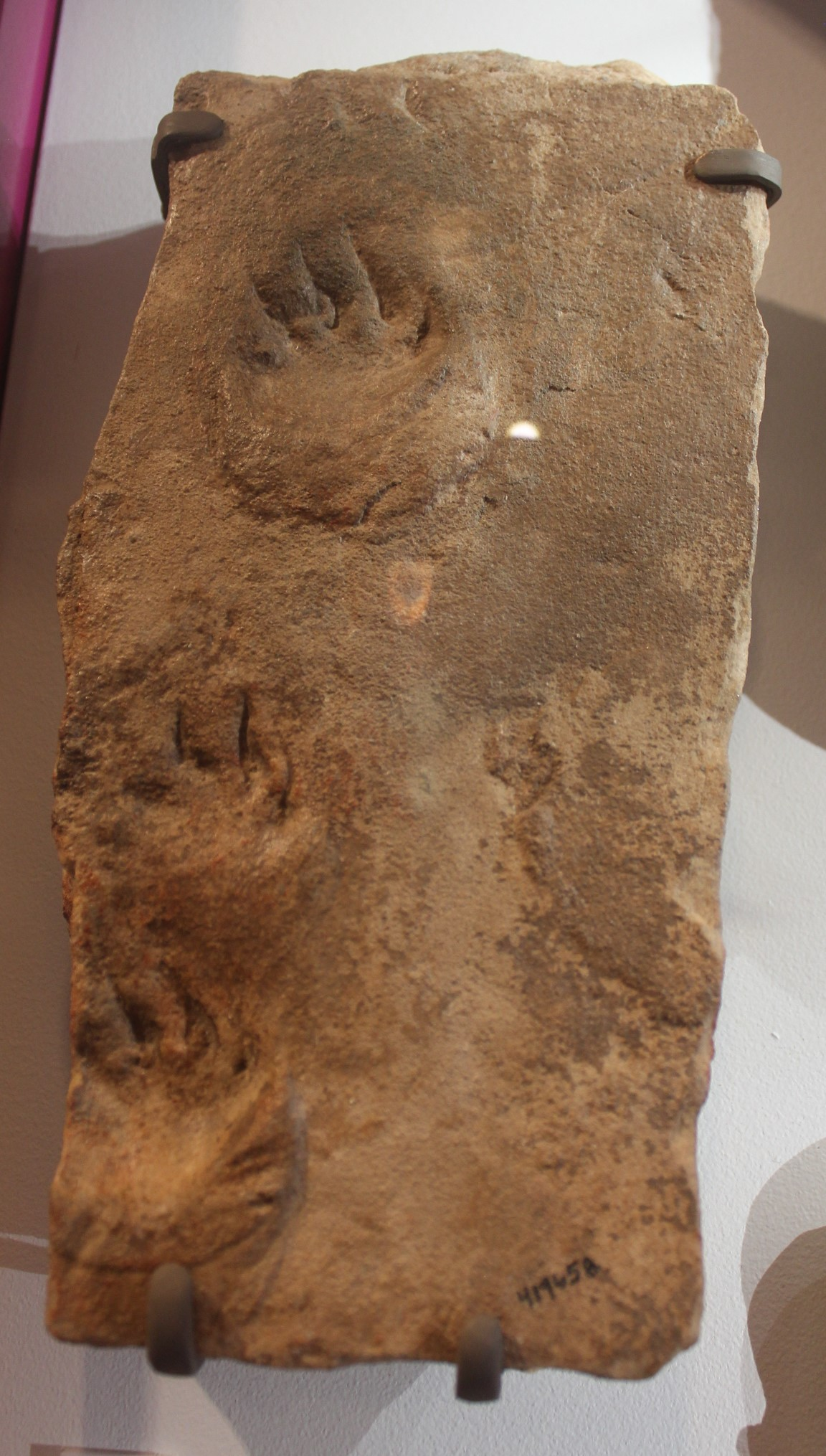
- Tracks of Chelichnus bucklandi, National Museum of Natural History

Trace fossil classification
- Ichnogenus: Chelichnus; Jardine, 1850

Ichnospecies
- †Chelichnus bucklandi; †Chelichnus duncani; †Chelichnus gigas; †Chelichnus lyelli; †Chelichnus megacheirus; †Chelichnus precei; †Chelichnus titan

= Chelichnus =

Chelichnus Temporal range: Permian

Trace fossil

Chelichnus is an ichnogenus of Permian tetrapod footprint. The name means tortoise traces, because the shape of the prints was originally mistakenly thought to be produced by a tortoise. This is now known to be incorrect, as tortoises did not evolve until much later. It was first found in Corncockle Quarry in Dumfries, Scotland, and described by Rev. Henry Duncan.

In ichnology, footprints and other traces are given a genus and species name, the ichnogenus and ichnospecies, that is based on the shape of the print. However, it is almost impossible to match a track mark to the animal that made it. Chelichnus has been argued to belong to either a therapsid, or a reptile. It has sometimes mistakenly been referred to as a dinosaur footprint by the media and public, but it is not, as dinosaurs did not exist at this time.

== Description ==
The fore and hind foot are both rounded and nearly equal in size, but the forefoot is slightly smaller, and the fore and hind footprints are placed closely together. Both have five digits though three to four digits are more commonly seen due to poor preservation. Digits are usually separated from the sole. The inner digits are directed forwards, while the outermost digit is direct more to the side.

== See also ==
- 19th century in ichnology
