= Jon Stewart–Jim Cramer conflict =

2009 feud

Cramer and Stewart meet on The Daily Show.

On March 12, 2009, television personality Jim Cramer appeared as a guest on The Daily Show with Jon Stewart. The host of CNBC's Mad Money, Cramer appeared in response to host Jon Stewart's highly publicized week-long criticism of CNBC. The exchange began with a scathing piece on CNBC's miscalculations regarding the 2008 financial crisis in response to CNBC commentator Rick Santelli, who had recently said on the floor of the Chicago Board of Trade that homeowners facing foreclosure were "losers". Santelli had been set to appear on the show, but CNBC canceled Santelli's appearance. Stewart, along with Daily Show executives, claimed the CNBC montage was not retaliatory and that they planned to show it before the cancellation was announced.

Subsequent media coverage of exchanges between Cramer (who had been featured heavily in the original segment) and Stewart led to a highly anticipated face-to-face confrontation on Stewart's show. The episode received a large amount of media hype, and it became the second most-viewed episode of The Daily Show, trailing only the 2009 Inauguration Day episode. It had 2.3 million total viewers, and the next day The Daily Show website saw its highest day of traffic year-to-date.

== Background ==
=== March 4 segment ===
On March 4, The Daily Show aired an eight-minute clip lampooning CNBC at the beginning of a segment in response to an outburst by Rick Santelli broadcast from the floor of the Chicago exchange. In it, Stewart implied that CNBC's commentary was overly optimistic or too strongly slanted in favor of the companies being discussed by featuring several clips of CNBC pundits accompanied by slides showing the eventual failure of their predictions. In one clip, a CNBC host reported American International Group (AIG) would not need capital, which The Daily Show followed with a list of the bailout money—amounting to billions of dollars—that the financial services firm had required since September 2008. On-air editor Charles Gasparino was shown saying in December 2007 how AIG's subprime losses were "very manageable", which was followed with a clip showing that AIG had also received a large amount of federal bailout money. Commentator Larry Kudlow was shown saying in April 2008 that "the worst of this subprime business is over."

In another clip, Jim Cramer was shown simply affirming "Your money is safe in Bear Stearns", followed by a Daily Show statement that the global investment bank went under six days later. "If I'd only followed CNBC's advice, I'd have a million dollars today", Stewart said during the piece, "provided I'd started with a hundred million dollars."

=== March 5 comments ===
On March 5, Stewart appeared on the Late Show with David Letterman, where he continued his criticism. Stewart said, "The thing that upsets me the most, honestly, there are three 24-hour financial networks. All their slogans are like, 'We know what's going on in Wall Street.' But then you turn it on during the crisis, and they're like, 'We don't know what's going on!' It'd be like turning on The Weather Channel in a hurricane, and they're just doing this: 'Why am I wet? What's happening to me? And it's so windy! What's going on, I'm scared!' How do you not know, man?"

=== March 9 comments ===
On March 9, during a segment of Mad Money, Cramer admitted,

OK, I'm a tempting target. Plenty of people come in and give their criticism on this show. But we're dealing with serious issues here; we need solutions, which I offer almost every night. I don't want ad hominem attacks. Take The New York Times columnist Frank Rich and Jon Stewart; I criticize Obama, so both of them seize on the urban legend that I recommended Bear Stearns the week before it collapsed, when I simply told an e-mailer that the deposit in his account at Bear Stearns was safe. 'Your money is safe in Bear Stearns,'

Cramer repeated, referring to his own quote during a March 11, 2008 segment of Mad Money. Moreover, Cramer outlined,

But through a clever sound bite, Stewart, and subsequently Rich—neither of whom have bothered to listen to the context of the pulled quote—pass off the notion of account safety as an out-and-out buy recommendation. If you called Mad Money and asked me about Citigroup, I would tell you that the common stock might be worthless, but I would never tell you to pull your money out of the bank because I was worried about its solvency. Your money is safe in Citi as I said it was in Bear. The fact that I was right rankles me even more.

On the episode of The Daily Show that night, Stewart jokingly responded with an apology for taking Cramer's comments out of context. "OK, I was wrong. So Jim Cramer, I apologize," Stewart said. He then promptly showcased video of Cramer suggesting the safety of Bear Stearns stock during the Lightning Round on Mad Money, eleven days prior to the collapse of Bear Stearns. Stewart then stated, "He's not saying literally 'I'm asking you to buy Bear Stearns'; for that you have to go back a full seven weeks before the stock completely collapsed." Stewart then showed additional video footage of Cramer on January 24, 2008 telling TheStreet.com TV viewers to specifically "buy Bear Stearns" stock seven weeks before it collapsed. A clip showed Cramer's stating that he liked the stock at prices above $60, and later on February 5, 2008, Cramer changed Bear Stearns' rating to a Sell on TheStreet.com.

=== March 10 comments ===
During a Tuesday appearance on NBC's Today show, Cramer said of The Daily Show piece, "The absurdity astounds me. Jon Stewart is a comedian, and he's decided to focus on some calls I made during a bull market. The guy is a comedian."

Also on March 10, Cramer appeared on MSNBC's Morning Joe. Commentator Joe Scarborough weighed in on the feud, criticizing Stewart and The Daily Show for being unfair to those ideologically opposed to Stewart: "I would like to see Jon Stewart come out and tell us what he believes in. Tell us where America needs to go in the future. And let us take a microphone around and a camera around with him 24 hours a day for a couple of months and then we can edit out all the mistakes he makes. It's very easy to shoot at the arena."

All of Cramer's daytime appearances took place on channels owned by NBCUniversal, CNBC's parent company. On The Daily Show that night, Stewart mocked NBC's corporate PR strategy by humorously being digitally inserted into Nickelodeon's Dora the Explorer and MTV's The Hills, both of which air on networks owned by Viacom, the parent company of Comedy Central and The Daily Show.

=== March 11 comments ===
Cramer defended himself in a column published on March 11, which claimed that Stewart's criticism of Cramer had taken his words out of context. Regarding Stewart's comments about Cramer and Bear Stearns, Cramer wrote that he was simply reassuring viewers that their liquidity held in Bear Stearns was safe. He also said that he had told his viewers to sell all their stocks in October 2008.

The March 11 episode of The Daily Show only briefly mentioned the controversy by featuring a montage of various network news personalities repeatedly characterizing Stewart and Cramer's back-and-forth as a "war of words", "full-blown war" and "anchor war," which Stewart called a "largely manufactured battle." Stewart also announced that Cramer would appear on the show on the following night.

=== March 12 comments ===
On March 12, the morning of his interview on The Daily Show, Cramer appeared as a guest on the syndicated cooking show Martha (distributed by CNBC's parent company, NBCUniversal). Cramer revealed trepidation to Martha Stewart about his upcoming appearance that night: "I'm a little nervous ... How bad is it gonna be? Is he gonna kill me?" Cramer continued that he had previously idolized Jon Stewart: "The reason why it's been so hard for me, the attacks, is that early on I patterned my show off of his, which is that you can do an entertainment business show. And then suddenly to be attacked by a guy that's your idol makes it difficult."

== Cramer on The Daily Show ==
On March 12, Jim Cramer appeared on The Daily Show with Stewart amid widespread media publicity that included a front-page article in USA Today.

Stewart claimed CNBC shirked its journalistic duty by simply accepting information given to it by corporations, rather than playing an investigative role as a "powerful tool of illumination." Stewart stated his belief that such failure was due to too much emphasis on entertainment value and a lacking sense of journalistic responsibility.

Stewart aired archive footage of Cramer admitting to the ease of manipulating markets and commented that Cramer's on-air personality lacks honesty:

I understand you want to make finance entertaining, but it's not a fucking game. And when I watch that, I get, I can't tell you how angry that makes me. Because what it says to me is: you all know. You all know what's going on. You know, you can draw a straight line from those shenanigans to the stuff that was being pulled at Bear, and AIG, and all this derivative market stuff that is this weird Wall Street side bet.

Stewart said of Cramer in particular, "I can't reconcile the brilliance and knowledge that you have of the intricacies of the market with the crazy bullshit I see you do every night."

Cramer disagreed with Stewart on a few points, but mostly acknowledged that he could have done a better job foreseeing the economic collapse: "We all should have seen it more." Not content with his explanation, Stewart showed videos in which Cramer recommended ways to drive down stock prices by spreading false rumors, deceiving the U.S. Securities and Exchange Commission (SEC), and deliberately misleading journalists. Cramer admitted that he can do better, and that he can change. He also pointed out the mass illusion on Wall Street and the finance industry in general that, in the words of former Merrill Lynch CEO Stanley O'Neal, "fixed income and credit (i.e. the economy) were no longer cyclical in nature", and that this illusion had permeated Wall Street and all other industries connected to it, including the finance networks.

Stewart also fired back at Joe Scarborough by telling Cramer to relay the message that the nature of The Daily Show's satire is not to be fair. In addition, Stewart apologized to Cramer for the personalized nature of the media coverage by saying,

You now have become the face of this, and that is incredibly unfortunate. Because you're not the face of it, you shouldn't be the face of it. You were the person that was, uh, I-don't-know-what enough to stand up and go, 'Hey, that wasn't fair!' Which it's not, because this show isn't fair, and you can tell 'Doucheborough' it isn't supposed to be fair.

The interview ended with Stewart suggesting, "Maybe we can remove 'In Cramer We Trust' and go back to the fundamentals and I can go back to making fart noises and funny faces." Cramer responded: "I think we make that deal right here."

== Reactions to the interview ==
Much of the exchange including the interview had become a viral internet meme by March 13, and Stewart was given positive reactions by many mainstream media sources, with certain newspapers such as the San Francisco Chronicle and The New York Times portraying Stewart as "winning" the debate. A blog by Maureen Ryan from the Chicago Tribune website was titled "Stewart cleans Cramer's clock", and ABCNews.com titled an article on the confrontation "Jon Stewart Wins Cramer Showdown". The New York Times reported that, "For his part, a chastened Mr. Cramer, much more subdued than on his own show, took turns apologizing, defending his past coverage and promising to try and get back to the basics of financial reporting in the future."

News outlets generally hailed Stewart's journalistic integrity during the interview. A mention in Newsweek reported, "Cramer's excuse: CEOs lied. Stewart's retort: act like a real journalist. Stewart did." James Fallows of The Atlantic contended that, "Stewart, without excessive showboating, did the journalistic sensibility proud." Director of the Project for Excellence in Journalism Tom Rosenstiel stated his belief that it was Stewart's ambiguous position between news and comedy that allowed him to call out CNBC so aggressively.

Referring to Stewart's interview with Cramer, White House Press Secretary Robert Gibbs said, "I enjoyed it thoroughly." He added that he had spoken with President Barack Obama on the day before about watching the show, but that he "forgot to e-mail and remind him that it was on", so he could not tell whether Obama had seen the segment.

Some sources also felt that Stewart's anger was a reflection of a general attitude held by the American public, such as Jon Friedman of MarketWatch. David Folkenflik of NPR stated,

At times, Stewart crystallizes the frustration others have with the failings of the media with near-perfect pitch. It's one thing for media critics like me to pore through hundreds of articles to say the press didn't quite do its job as a watchdog of the nation's financial system. It's another for Stewart to cudgel a channel that has often championed the markets at a time when so many people have lost so much of their net value.

Others felt that Stewart's anger was unwarranted or misdirected. Richard Cohen of The Washington Post called it a "cheap shot at business media". In an article from The Daily Beast, Tucker Carlson, whose own cable television show was cancelled after a similar encounter with Stewart on Crossfire in 2004, criticized Stewart for having illogical arguments. Carlson also implied that Stewart was attacking CNBC because he was unwilling to go after the new Democratic administration as he had in the past with the administration under George W. Bush.

== Impact ==
Though Cramer's appearance on The Daily Show had been hyped by NBC in the lead up to Cramer's appearance, CNBC declined to comment directly following its airing. Instead, CNBC issued a broad statement in defense of its track record:

Recognized as the worldwide leader in business news, CNBC produces more than 150 hours of live television a week that includes more than 850 interviews in the service of exposing all sides of every critical financial and economic issue. We are proud of our record and remain committed to delivering coverage in real-time during this extraordinary story and beyond.

Insiders at CNBC, however, privately acknowledged that the interview was ultimately a public relations disaster for the network; viewership went down 10% in the first three days after the interview. In a conference held March 18, the CEO of NBC Universal, Jeff Zucker, called Stewart's attacks on business network CNBC "incredibly unfair" and "completely out of line".

Days after the airing of the program, a group of economists and progressives issued an open letter to CNBC and called for public signatures. The letter demanded that the network set higher journalistic standards and said that, "Americans need CNBC to do strong, watchdog journalism — asking tough questions to Wall Street ... Instead, CNBC has done PR for Wall Street." The letter was signed by a variety of economists and journalists, such as Dean Baker of the Center for Economic and Policy Research and Doug Henwood, author of Wall Street and After the New Economy. Funded by the Progressive Change Campaign Committee, a political action committee focused on electing progressive Democrats in congressional elections, the group also launched a website, fixcnbc.com. Their stated goal was to persuade CNBC executives to prioritize investigative financial journalism over Wall Street "access".

In a May 2011 interview with The New York Times, Cramer explained that he was unprepared for Stewart's intense interview, saying

As soon as he started, I realized Stewart was on a mission to make me look like a clown. I didn't defend myself because I wasn't prepared. What was I supposed to do, talk about how often I had been right? Praise myself? Get mad? I was mad, but I didn't want to give the audience any blood. The national media said I got crushed, which I did, and made me into a buffoon ... They wanted to make me the Face of the Era, and they succeeded. Rick Santelli's a conservative. Ideological. O.K., I get that. But me? I was very anti-Bush. I'm a Democrat, I've got the canceled checks to prove it, and suddenly I'm the enemy? Me? Me?
