= Jim Cramer =

American stockbroker and television personality (born 1955)

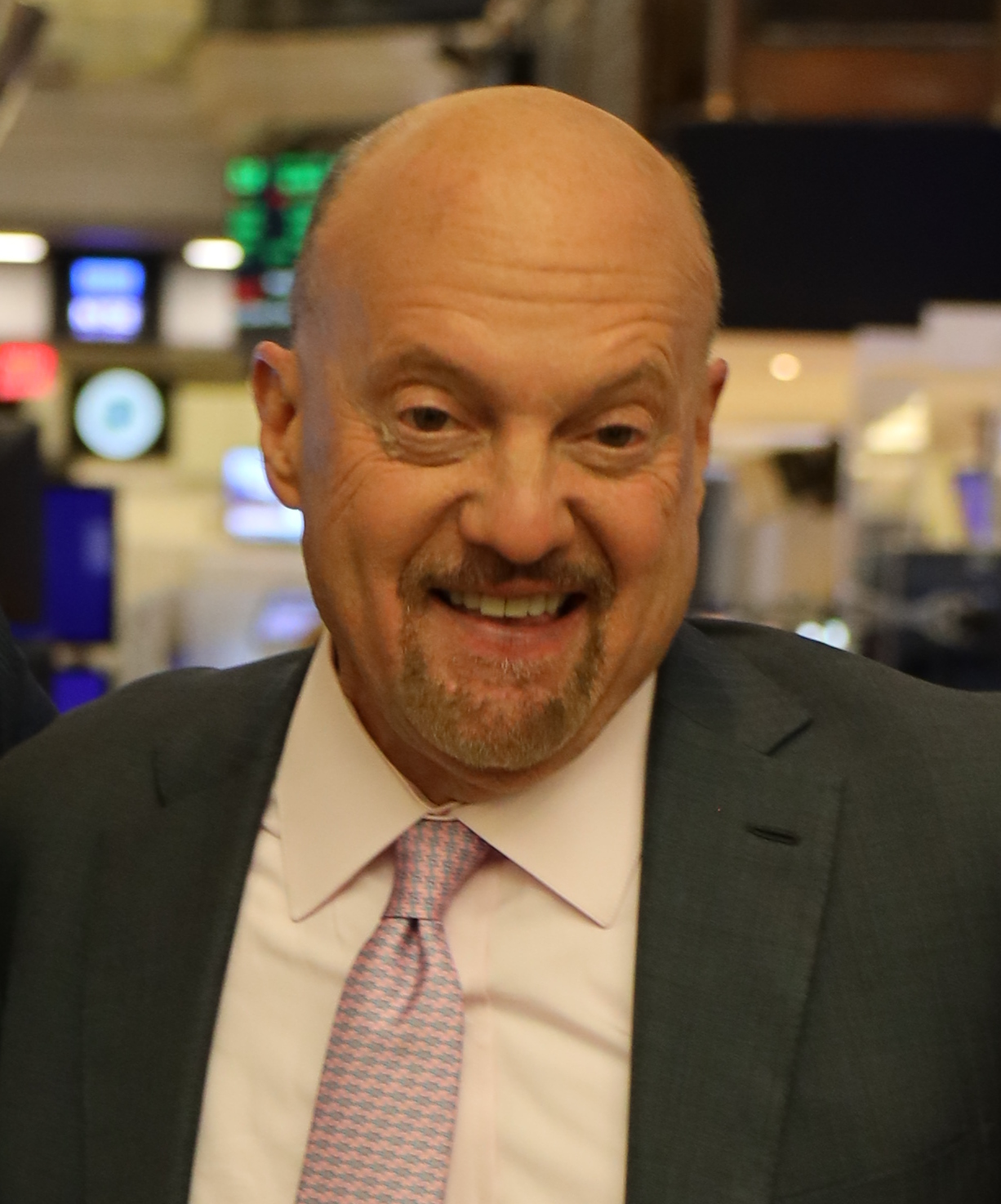
- Cramer in 2021
- Born: James Joseph Cramer; February 10, 1955 (age 71); Wyndmoor, Pennsylvania, US
- Education: Harvard University (AB, JD)
- Occupations: Television personality, author, entertainer
- Years active: 1980–present
- Known for: Hosting Mad Money; Co-founder of TheStreet; CNBC anchor
- Spouses: Karen Backfisch (m. 1988–2009) Lisa Cadette Detwiler (m. 2015)
- Children: 2

James Joseph Cramer (born February 10, 1955) is an American television personality, author, entertainer and former hedge fund manager. He is the host of Mad Money on CNBC and an anchor on Squawk on the Street. After graduating from Harvard College and Harvard Law School, he worked for Goldman Sachs and then became a hedge fund manager, founder and senior partner of Cramer Berkowitz.

Cramer co-founded TheStreet, which he wrote for from 1996 to 2021. Cramer hosted Kudlow & Cramer from 2002 to 2005. Mad Money first aired on CNBC in 2005. Cramer has written several books, including Confessions of a Street Addict (2002), Jim Cramer's Real Money: Sane Investing in an Insane World (2005), Jim Cramer's Mad Money: Watch TV, Get Rich (2006), Jim Cramer's Get Rich Carefully (2013), and How to Make Money in Any Market (2025).

== Early life ==
Cramer was born in 1955 in Wyndmoor, Pennsylvania (a suburb of Philadelphia) to Jewish parents. Cramer's mother, Louise A. Cramer (1928–1985), was an artist. Cramer's father, N. Ken Cramer (1922–2014), owned International Packaging Products, a Philadelphia-based company that sold wrapping paper, boxes, and bags to retailers and restaurants.

Cramer and his family moved to Springfield Township, and he attended Springfield Township High School in Montgomery County, Pennsylvania, graduating in 1973. He competed for the high school track team. Among his first jobs, starting in 1971, Cramer sold Coca-Cola and then ice cream at Veterans Stadium during Philadelphia Phillies games. Cramer first began studying stocks in the fourth grade, and continued the habit through high school.

== Education and early career ==
In 1977, Cramer graduated magna cum laude from Harvard College with a Bachelor of Arts in government. While at Harvard, he was the president and editor-in-chief of The Harvard Crimson. Additionally, Cramer was a National Merit Scholar.

After college, Cramer was an entry-level reporter, making $15,000 per year. Beginning March 1, 1978, Cramer worked for the Tallahassee Democrat in Tallahassee, Florida, where he was one of the first people to cover the Ted Bundy murders since he lived only a few blocks away. Then-executive editor Richard Oppel said: "[Cramer] was like a driving ram. He was great at getting the story." He subsequently worked for the Los Angeles Herald-Examiner writing obituaries. During this time, his apartment was robbed and he lost everything, forcing him to live out of his car for nine months. He also worked for Governor of California Jerry Brown. Cramer was one of the first reporters at American Lawyer.

In 1984, Cramer earned a Juris Doctor degree from Harvard Law School. Cramer started investing in the stock market while he attended law school. He made enough from trading to cover his tuition. Cramer began promoting his holdings by leaving stock picks on his answering machine. While at Harvard, alumnus Michael Kinsley introduced him to The New Republic owner Martin Peretz, who contacted Cramer to write a book review. After first profiting from the stock picks he heard on Cramer's answering machine, Peretz gave Cramer $500,000 to invest. In two years, Cramer made $150,000 for Peretz. During his years at Harvard Law School, Cramer worked as a minor research assistant for Alan Dershowitz. He assisted Dershowitz's campaign to acquit alleged murderer Claus von Bülow, even though Cramer believed von Bülow was "supremely guilty".

== Career ==
Cramer speaking about the Paris Agreement and Hewlett Packard Enterprise

=== Goldman Sachs ===
In 1984, Cramer worked in sales and trading at New York investment bank Goldman Sachs. Cramer was admitted to the New York State Bar in 1985, but did not practice. After he did not renew his registration, his license to practice law was suspended on April 2, 2009.

=== Hedge fund ===
In 1987, Cramer left Goldman Sachs and started a hedge fund, Cramer & Co. (later Cramer, Berkowitz & Co.). The fund operated out of the offices of hedge fund manager Michael Steinhardt. Early investors included friend and Harvard classmate Eliot Spitzer, Steve Brill, and Martin Peretz. Cramer raised $450 million in $5 million increments and received a fee of 20% of the profits he generated.

Cramer says he sold all of his stocks on the Friday before Black Monday in 1987. From 1988 to 2000, Cramer says he had only one year of negative returns—1998, a year when the S&P 500 rose 29%. The underperformance in 1998 led to significant investor withdrawals. In 1999 the fund returned 47%, and in 2000 it returned 28%, beating the S&P 500 by 38 percentage points. Cramer said he produced a 24% average annual return over 14 years, and "routinely [took] home $10 million a year and more." However, his results have been disputed. In 2001, Cramer retired from managing the hedge fund. The fund was then taken over by his former partner, Jeff Berkowitz.

=== SmartMoney ===
Cramer was also an "editor at large" for SmartMoney magazine. He was accused by some of an unethical practice when he made a $2 million personal gain after buying stocks before his recommendation article was published, though he was candid in the article that he had purchased the stock; however, according to Ira Lee Sorkin, former head of the New York office of the S.E.C., inasmuch as Cramer was a writer for a general-interest publication, an argument can be made that Cramer did not breach any obligations.

=== TheStreet ===
In 1996, Cramer and Peretz launched TheStreet, a financial news and investment website. In August 2019, TheMaven acquired the company for $16.5 million.

=== CNBC ===
Cramer was a frequent guest commentator on CNBC in the late 1990s. From 2002 to 2005, Cramer co-hosted Kudlow & Cramer (first called America Now) with Larry Kudlow. Mad Money with Jim Cramer first aired on CNBC in 2005. The stated goal of the show is to provide people engaging in do-it-yourself investing with "the knowledge and the tools that will empower you to be a better investor". According to CNBC, Cramer is not allowed to own stocks that could be discussed on the show.

=== Other media appearances ===
In 2001, Cramer began hosting a syndicated one-hour radio show, Real Money, which eventually spawned Mad Money. The radio show ran until December 2006. In 2005, Cramer appeared as himself in two episodes of Arrested Development. He announced that he had upgraded Bluth Company stock to a "Don't Buy" from a "Triple Sell", and then said that the stock was not a "Don't Buy" anymore, but a "Risky". On November 13, 2005, Dan Rather interviewed Cramer on 60 Minutes. Among the topics of discussion was Cramer's past at his hedge fund, including his former violent temper. Cramer has also made appearances on Today, NBC Nightly News, Live with Regis and Kelly, Cheap Seats, Late Night with Conan O'Brien, The Tonight Show with Jay Leno, Late Show with David Letterman, Jimmy Kimmel Live! in February 2008, as well as a guest judge on The Apprentice in January 2007, and was interviewed by Jon Stewart on The Daily Show in March 2009 (see Jon Stewart–Jim Cramer conflict). Cramer also appeared in the 2008 motion picture Iron Man spoofing Stark Industries on his show Mad Money, and he also appeared in the movie Wall Street: Money Never Sleeps. Moreover, he says he consulted for the original Wall Street movie by telling the filmmakers how he would get through to Gordon Gekko.

== Controversies ==
=== Fox News Channel lawsuit ===
In 2000, Cramer and TheStreet settled a lawsuit with Fox News Channel in which Fox had claimed Cramer had reneged on a deal to produce a show for Fox and Cramer had counter-sued. The conflict began when Fox complained that Cramer promoted TheStreet stock on its network without giving advance notice to the program's producer.

=== Cramer's investments ===
==== Performance ====
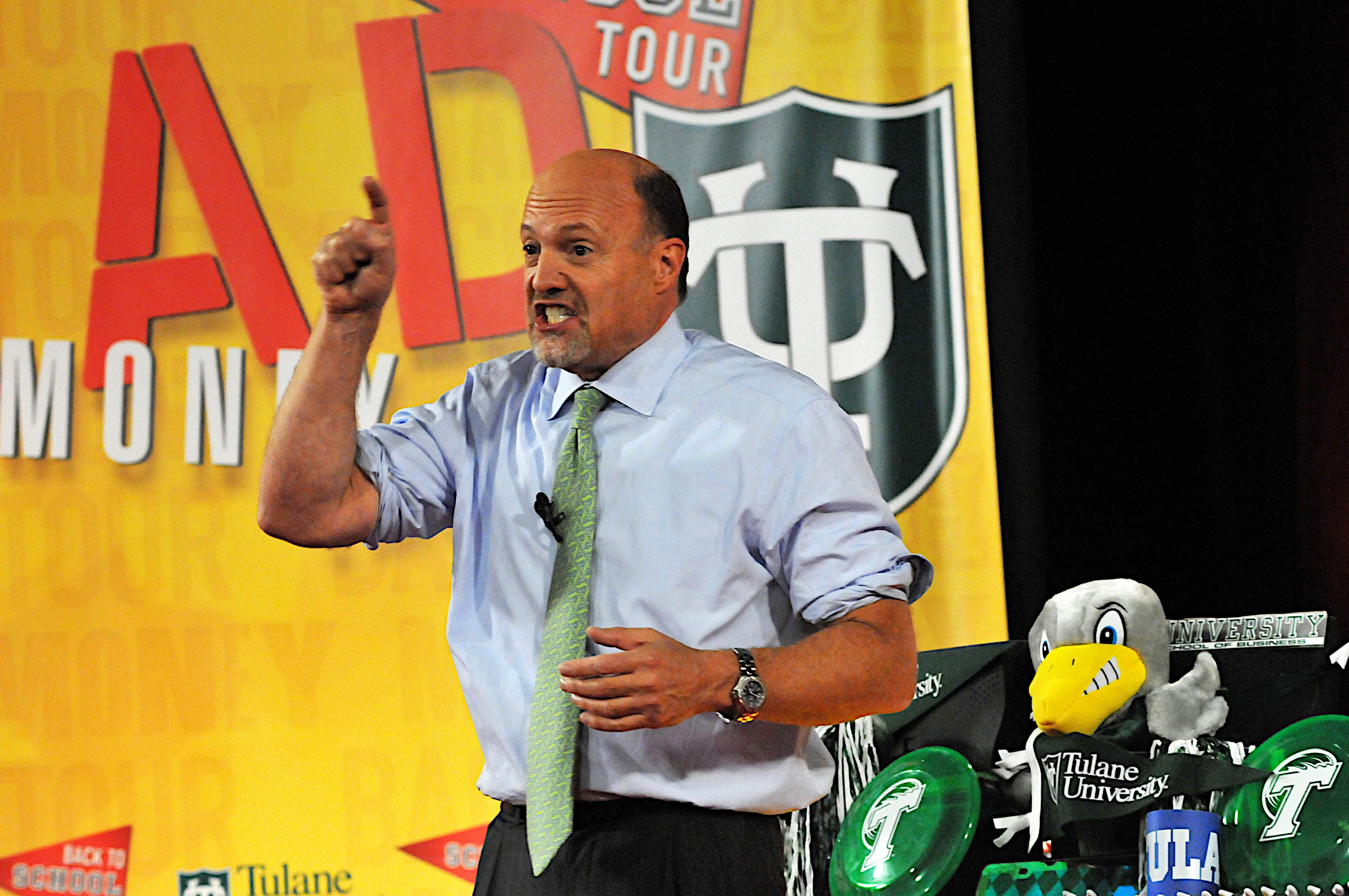
Cramer in 2010

As manager of his hedge fund, Cramer said he realized a "rate of return of 24% after all fees for 15 years," until he retired from the hedge fund in 2001. He self-reported a 36% return in 2000, at the peak of the dot-com bubble.

In January 2000, close to the peak of the dot-com bubble, Cramer recommended investing in technology stocks, and suggested a repeat of the stock performance of 1999. In February 2000, the year in which Cramer said he produced a 36% return, Cramer said that there were only 10 stocks he wanted to own, and he was buying them every day. These stocks were 724 Solutions, Ariba, Digital Island, Exodus Communications, InfoSpace, Inktomi, Mercury Interactive, Sonera, VeriSign, and Veritas Software. He also dismissed the investing strategy of Benjamin Graham and David Dodd, and said that price–earnings ratios did not matter.

An August 20, 2007, article in Barron's stated that "his picks haven't beaten the market. Over the past two years, viewers holding Cramer's stocks would be up 12% while the Dow rose 22% and the S&P 500 16%." Cramer was criticized for repeatedly giving erroneous advice during the 2008 financial crisis. He recommended investing in Bear Stearns, Merrill Lynch, Morgan Stanley, Wachovia, and Lehman Brothers before the stocks fell in value significantly and several went out of business. On August 8, 2008, before the climax of the 2008 financial crisis, Cramer recommended investing in bank stocks.

On October 6, 2008, on Today, when the S&P 500 was valued at 1,056, Cramer suggested to investors, "Whatever money you need for the next five years, please take it out of the stock market." Five months later, the market bottomed at 666, a 36.9% decline. A February 9, 2009, article in The Wall Street Journal said that trading against Cramer's Buy recommendations using short-term options had historically yielded 25% in a month. In a series of recommendations made from September to November 2012, Cramer advised selling Netflix, Green Mountain Coffee Roasters, Hewlett-Packard, and Best Buy. Over the roughly six months that followed, all four stocks ranked among the four best performers in the Wilshire U.S. Large-Cap Index: Netflix gained 174.49%, Green Mountain Coffee Roasters gained 161.68%, Best Buy gained 124.64%, and Hewlett-Packard gained 115.62%.

On February 8, 2023, Cramer recommended viewers buy Silicon Valley Bank stock just a month before its collapse. On March 10, he praised First Republic Bank as a "very good bank" in a Twitter post. First Republic's stock dropped by more than 80% in the days following Cramer's tweet and on May 1, it also collapsed, becoming the third and final bank to fail in the 2023 banking crisis.

==== Performance of Action Alerts charitable trust ====
Cramer says that, between 2002 and May 2009, the performance of his "Action Alerts PLUS" charitable trust outpaced the S&P 500 and the Russell 2000 Index. The charitable trust realized a return of 31.75%, the S&P 500 had a return of 18.75%, and the Russell 2000 had a return of 22.51%. On an annual basis, the trust outperformed the S&P 500 by 7.35%, and the Russell 2000 Index by 3.33%. Paul Bolster said that Cramer beats the market in part because of the excess risk in his picks. "If we adjust for his market risk, we come up with an excess return that is essentially zero", Bolster said, adding that "zero", in this case, means his returns are roughly in line with the risk he's taking on. Another criticism of Actions Alerts Plus was that it did not compare itself to indexes that include dividend reinvestment (as the SEC requires for stock-oriented mutual funds). According to Kiplinger's article "One recent [Action Alerts PLUS] and included a chart, under the headline "Action Alert PLUS is CRUSHING the S&P 500", showing that the picks returned about 39% from the portfolio's inception through last March 31, compared with 15.5% for the S&P 500 over the same nine-year, three-month period. But the S&P figure did not include reinvested dividends. With them, the S&P 500 returned 38.3%."

A study by Wharton researchers Jonathan Hartley and Matthew Olson found that in the timeframe of August 2001 to March 2016, Cramer's charitable trust underperformed the S&P 500 primarily as a result of underexposure to market returns in years after the 2008 financial crisis. As of March 31, 2016, Cramer's trust since inception had a cumulative return of 64.5%, whereas the S&P 500 fewer dividends returned 70% during the same timeframe. Wharton finance professor Robert Stambaugh said he didn't think the findings showed significant underperformance or outperformance when adjusting for a variety of factors, but did say "It's a commendable attempt to dig more deeply into the style that underlies Cramer's stock picks."

==== "Market manipulation" ====
In a December 2006 interview, Cramer described activities used by hedge fund managers to manipulate stock prices—some of debatable legality and others illegal. He described how he could push stocks higher or lower with as little as $5 million in capital when he was running his hedge fund. Cramer said, "A lot of times when I was short at my hedge fund ... When I was positioned short—meaning I needed it down—I would create a level of activity beforehand that could drive the futures." He also encouraged hedge funds to engage in this type of activity because it is "a very quick way to make money."

Cramer stated that everything he did was legal, but that illegal activity is common in the hedge fund industry as well. He also stated that some hedge fund managers spread false rumors to drive a stock down: "What's important when you are in that hedge-fund mode is to not do anything remotely truthful because the truth is so against your view, that it's important to create a new truth, to develop a fiction." Cramer described a variety of tactics that hedge fund managers use to affect a stock's price. Cramer said that one strategy to keep a stock price down is to spread false rumors to reporters he described as "the Pisanis of the world", in reference to CNBC correspondent Bob Pisani, whom Cramer insinuated was able to be manipulated, saying "You have to use these guys." He also discussed giving information to "the bozo reporter from The Wall Street Journal" to get an article published. Cramer said this practice, although illegal, is easy to do "because the SEC doesn't understand it." During the interview, Cramer referred to himself as a "banking-class hero".

=== Recommendation regarding Bear Stearns (March 2008) ===
On the March 11, 2008, episode of Cramer's show Mad Money, a viewer submitted the question "Should I be worried about Bear Stearns in terms of liquidity and get my money out of there?" Cramer responded "No! No! No! Bear Stearns is not in trouble. If anything, they're more likely to be taken over. Don't move your money from Bear." On March 14, 2008, the stock lost more than half of its value on news of a Fed bailout and $2/share takeover by JPMorgan Chase.

On March 17, 2008, Cramer said his statements were made in regards to the liquidity of accounts held at Bear Stearns as opposed to the stock. Cramer said he was not recommending the common stock, but allaying concerns about the account holder's liquidity held in a Bear Stearns brokerage account. Cramer later wrote about the incident: "I did tell an emailer that his deposit in his account at Bear Stearns was safe, but through a clever sound bite, (Jon) Stewart, and subsequently (Frank) Rich—neither of whom have bothered to listen to the context of the pulled quote—pass off the notion of account safety as an out-and-out buy recommendation. The absurdity astounds me. If you called Mad Money and asked me about Citigroup, I would tell you that the common stock might be worthless, but I would never tell you to pull your money out of the bank because I was worried about its solvency. Your money is safe in Citi as I said it was in Bear. The fact that I was right rankles me even more."

An article by author Michael Lewis for Bloomberg News said that TheStreet listed Bear Stearns as a "Buy" at $62 per share on March 11, 2008, which was the same day as the caller's question and a day before the collapse of Bear Stearns. During the Jon Stewart–Jim Cramer conflict, on The Daily Show on March 12, 2009, Cramer admitted he made mistakes on his Bear Stearns calls.

==== Criticism of Barack Obama's policies (March 2009) ====
On March 2, 2009, Cramer said that then President Barack Obama was on a "radical agenda", and said that was responsible for "the greatest wealth destruction I have seen by a president". In response to a reporter's question, Press Secretary Robert Gibbs replied, "If you turn on a certain program, it's geared to a very small audience. I'm not entirely sure what he's pointing to make some of the statements..... You can go back and look at any number of statements he's made in the past about the economy and wonder where some of the back-ups for those are, too."

On March 5, 2009, Cramer responded to the White House, saying, "Backup? Look at the incredible decline in the stock market, in all indices, since the inauguration of the president, with the drop accelerating when the budget plan came to light because of the massive fear and indecision the document sowed: Raising taxes on the eve of what could be a second Great Depression, destroying the profits in healthcare companies, tinkering with the mortgage deduction at a time when U.S. house price depreciation is behind much of the world's morass and certainly the devastation affecting our banks, and pushing an aggressive cap and trade program that could raise the price of energy for millions of people." By the end of Obama's term in office, major stock market indexes had more than doubled from the levels of March 2009.

Referring to March 8, 2009, charges leveled against Cramer by The New York Times columnist Frank Rich, Cramer said that he does not understand how Obama and his staff planned to raise taxes, institute cap-and-trade limitations, and rework the healthcare system all during a recession. The article said: "It isn't that Cramer disagrees with Obama's vision for the country—he even agrees with taxing the rich—but now is not the time to put those plans into action. The president needs to solve our housing, employment, and financial problems, and only then turn his attention to healthcare and changing the mortgage deduction."

=== Controversy with Nouriel Roubini ===
Cramer wrote in 2009, that Nouriel Roubini was "intoxicated" with his own "prescience and vision", and should realize that things are better than he predicted. Roubini called Cramer a "buffoon", and told him to "just shut up". Cramer responded by inviting Roubini to appear on his show, and say that to his face. In 2021, Roubini called Cramer "a total f---ing idiot".

=== Debate with Jon Stewart (2009) ===
On March 12, 2009, Cramer appeared on The Daily Show with Jon Stewart. Stewart reiterated earlier claims regarding the CNBC host's "silly and/or embarrassing and/or stupid financial observations." Moreover, he said CNBC shirked its journalistic duty by believing corporate lies rather than being an investigative "powerful tool of illumination". Cramer disagreed with Stewart on a few points, but acknowledged that he could have done a better job foreseeing the economic collapse: "We all should have seen it more."

Stewart also said short-selling was detrimental to the markets and investors. Cramer agreed that short-selling was detrimental, stated his opposition to it, and said that he had never engaged in it. This contradicted earlier statements in which he described going short while managing a hedge fund. In a December 2006 interview from TheStreet's "Wall Street Confidential" webcast, Cramer said, "A lot of times when I was short at my hedge fund. ... When I was positioned short—meaning I needed it down—I would create a level of activity beforehand that could drive the futures." He said, "I will say this: I am trying to expose this stuff, exactly what you guys do, and I've been trying to get the regulators to look at it." However, Stewart played several video clips from 2006 where Cramer discussed the spreading of false rumors to drive down stock prices and encouraged short-selling by hedge funds as a means to generate returns. At one point in a clip from December 22, 2006, he said, "I would encourage anyone in a hedge fund to do it." He called it a very quick way to make money and very satisfying. He continued, "By the way, no one else in the world would ever admit that, but I don't care, and again, I'm not gonna say it on TV." Stewart responded, "I want the Jim Cramer on CNBC to protect me from that Jim Cramer." Cramer again admitted that he could do better and that he should try to change. The interview ended when Stewart pointedly suggested: "Maybe we can remove the 'financial expert' and the 'In Cramer We Trust' and start getting back to fundamentals on the reporting, as well, and I can go back to making fart noises and funny faces." Cramer responded: "I think we make that deal right here".

=== Criticism of the Federal Reserve (2007–08) ===
On August 3, 2007, in what was described as a "rant", Cramer made a plea for the Federal Reserve to cut interest rates. Cramer said of the Fed Committee, "They're nuts. They know nothing. This is a different kinda market. And the Fed is asleep." When the transcript from the August 7, 2007, meeting of the Federal Reserve Open Markets Committee was subsequently released on August 28, 2007, it showed that Cramer's comments elicited laughter from participants during a comment from Dennis Lockhart, president, and CEO of the Federal Reserve Bank of Atlanta. "I believe that the correct policy posture is to let the markets work through the changes in risk appetite and pricing that are underway, but the market observations of one of my more strident conversational counterparts—and that is not Jim Cramer [laughter]—are worth sharing." Cramer was vindicated for his negative outlook when the 2008 financial crisis and the Great Recession took hold. On Hardball with Chris Matthews on September 19, 2008, Cramer blamed the Federal Reserve for the United States housing bubble.

=== Calling House Speaker Nancy Pelosi "Crazy Nancy" during interview ===
On September 15, 2020, during a TV interview with U.S. Speaker of the House Nancy Pelosi, Cramer addressed her as "Crazy Nancy", and then posted several tweets in which he defended his actions. He later apologized for using the phrase, which was also employed frequently by President Donald Trump. During a discussion about the likelihood of a coronavirus relief bill, Cramer expressed doubt over the deal saying, "I mean, what deal can we have, Crazy Nancy?" He then quickly added "I'm sorry, I—that was the president. I have such reverence for the office, I would never use that term." "But you just did," Pelosi replied.

=== "Inverse Cramer" ETF ===
In 2022, in response to a long-running series of unrelated humorous social media comments suggesting to invest against Cramer's stock recommendations, The Financial Times published SEC filings which revealed that Tuttle Capital Management—the same firm behind Tuttle Capital Short Innovation ETF (which bet against Cathie Wood's Ark Invest) fund—had filed to launch two funds with one labeled "LJIM" and the other "SJIM", representing "Long Cramer" (which would bet with all of Cramer's recommendations) and "Inverse Cramer" (betting against everything that Cramer recommended) respectively. The Inverse Cramer ETF listed in its filings that aside from jokes or obviously meritable investment recommendations, in general, the fund would bet against all of Cramer's recommendations both on Mad Money and Cramer's Twitter feed, and the fund estimates to have a "high turnover rate". The fund gained additional coverage upon Meta Platforms' Q3 2022 earnings miss and Cramer's subsequent apology, which outlined another loss for the company and was seen by some that Cramer's apology was seen as a sign to buy Meta stock.

In 2026, a study was conducted on the Inverse Cramer meme. Examining 16,701 buy-side recommendations Cramer made between January 2018 and December 2024, and tracking each stock's subsequent one-year performance against the S&P 500, the study found that betting broadly against all of Cramer's calls performed roughly in line with the market rather than beating it. However, the result varied considerably by the type of call. Simple buy recommendations on small-capitalization stocks in which Cramer disclosed no ownership stake underperformed the market by an average of about 25 percentage points, while recommendations to buy stocks Cramer had previously disclosed as personal or Charitable Trust holdings, made after those stocks had fallen at least 15% over the preceding three months, outperformed the market by a comparable margin in the opposite direction.

== Personal life ==
From 1988 to 2009, Cramer was married to Karen Backfisch, a former stock trader known as the Trading Goddess, with whom he had two children. On April 18, 2015, Cramer married Lisa Cadette Detwiler, a real-estate broker, and general manager of The Longshoreman, an Italian bistro/restaurant in the borough of Brooklyn in New York City. Cramer lives in Summit, New Jersey. He also has a 65-acre estate in the countryside and a summer house in Quogue, New York, on Long Island. In a 2013 interview on The Carlos Watson Show, Cramer said that he dealt with mental-health issues surrounding his anger and his workplace behavior, attributing the problem to his childhood experiences with his father.

In 2009, Cramer and four other investors purchased the DeBary Inn in Summit. He and his wife also own Bar San Miguel, a restaurant and bar serving Mexican cuisine in Carroll Gardens, Brooklyn. Cramer was one of about 200 candidates for the Time 100 in 2009. Cramer loves Philadelphia and has said the key to an economic resurgence of the city is a high-speed rail connection with New York City. He is a Philadelphia Eagles fan and cried after the team was victorious in Super Bowl LII. He has held season tickets for 20 years, and has met former Eagles coach Doug Pederson many times.

== Bibliography ==
- Confessions of a Street Addict (2002) ISBN 0-7432-2487-6
- You Got Screwed! Why Wall Street Tanked and How You Can Prosper (2002) ISBN 0-7432-4690-X
- Jim Cramer's Real Money: Sane Investing in an Insane World (2005) ISBN 0-7432-2489-2
- Jim Cramer's Mad Money: Watch TV, Get Rich (2006) ISBN 1-4165-3790-2
- Jim Cramer's Stay Mad for Life: Get Rich, Stay Rich (Make Your Kids Even Richer) (2007) ISBN 978-1-4165-5885-9
- Jim Cramer's Getting Back to Even (2009) ISBN 978-1-4391-5801-2
- Jim Cramer's Get Rich Carefully (2013) ISBN 978-0399168185
- How to Make Money in Any Market (2025) ISBN 978-1668088647

== See also ==
- Broadcast journalism
- List of journalists in New York City
