= Richard A. Oppel Jr. =

American journalist

- Occupation: journalist
- Notable credit(s): The New York Times, Dallas Morning News, Fort Worth Star-Telegram, The Los Angeles Times

Richard A. Oppel Jr. is an American journalist who has reported for The New York Times from Iraq, Israel and Washington, D.C. He is a graduate of Duke University.

In the 90's, Oppel reported for the Los Angeles Times, the Fort Worth Star-Telegram and the Dallas Morning News.

== Personal ==
Oppel is the son of Rich Oppel, former editor of the Austin American-Statesman, and Carol V. Oppel, a freelance writer specializing in religious topics.

Oppel's sister, Shelby Oppel Wood, is an education reporter at The Oregonian newspaper.
