= Political hack =

Political pejorative

"Political hack" is a pejorative term describing a person who is more loyal to a particular political party than to their own sense of ethics. The term "hired gun" is often used in tandem to further describe the moral bankruptcy of the "hack". When a group of "political hacks" of a similar political affiliation get together, they are sometimes called a "political hack pack." When one side of a debate has more "political hacks" than the other, this is referred to as a "hack gap" and gives an advantage to the side with more "political hacks."

== See also ==
- Political machine
