= Richard Oppel =

American journalist

Rich Oppel
- Born: Richard A. Oppel; January 30, 1943 (age 83); Newark, N.J.
- Status: married
- Occupations: journalist and editor
- Notable credit(s): Austin American-Statesman, Charlotte Observer, Texas Monthly, The Tallahassee Democrat, Hill+Knowlton Strategies, Crosswind Media & Public Relations, Huston–Tillotson University
- Spouse: Carol V. Oppel
- Children: Richard A. Oppel Jr., Shelby Oppel Wood

Richard A. Oppel (born Jan. 30, 1943 in Newark, N.J.) is an American newspaper, magazine and digital editor living in Austin, Texas. He was interim editor-in-chief (May 5, 2018 – Feb. 1, 2019) of Texas Monthly, an Austin-based publication with a statewide readership of 2.4 million. The magazine covers the Texas scene, from politics, the environment, industry and education to music, the arts, travel, restaurants, museums and cultural events. While Oppel was editor of The Charlotte Observer (1978–1993), the newspaper earned three Pulitzer Prizes, sharing one for editorial cartoons with The Atlanta Constitution.

== Early life and education ==
Oppel is the son of the late Alfred W. and Jane G. Oppel. He graduated from Northeast High School in St. Petersburg, Florida, in 1960 and joined the U.S. Marine Corps Reserve, serving six months on active duty. He graduated from the University of South Florida with a B.A. degree in political science in 1964.

== Journalism career ==
In 1963, Oppel began his news career as a reporter covering police and rural news at The Tampa Tribune. He joined The Associated Press in 1965 in the state capital bureau in Tallahassee. In 1967, he was named Tampa correspondent, and in 1969 night news editor in Miami. The same year, he was named correspondent in charge of the Tallahassee bureau. He became state news editor in Miami in 1972, and in 1973 was promoted to Michigan chief of bureau in Detroit.

Oppel left AP in 1976 to join Knight-Ridder Newspapers. His first job was as associate editor of the Detroit Free Press. In 1977 he became executive editor of the Tallahassee Democrat, where he led the staff in conversion of the newspaper from afternoon to morning publication. In 1978, Oppel was named editor and vice president of The Charlotte Observer, the largest newspaper in the Carolinas. He served in that position until 1993, when he took over the Knight-Ridder Washington bureau as chief of bureau.

Oppel left Knight-Ridder to become editor and vice president of the Austin American-Statesman in 1995, retiring from that position in 2008.

== Post-newspapers career ==
In 2009 Oppel began work as senior vice president/media for Public Strategies Inc. (PSI) of Austin, serving as a strategy adviser to national firms in finance, law, computers, airlines, energy and telecommunications. In 2010, PSI merged with Hill & Knowlton to become Hill+Knowlton Strategies. Both firms were owned by the WPP Group.

He left H&K in 2012 to serve as a visiting professor of journalism at Huston–Tillotson University, a historically black institution of 1,000 students in Austin. In 2014 he was named interim vice president for institutional advancement, and helped raise money and lead construction of the Sandra Joy Anderson Community Health and Wellness Center to provide medical care to students and low-income residents in neighborhoods surrounding the university. He left HT in early 2016.

Oppel worked as senior vice president of Crosswind Media & Public Relations of Austin in 2016–2017, representing diverse clients in energy, infrastructure and healthcare, including trade associations before the Texas Legislature.

In February 2018, Oppel was hired by owner Paul Hobby to serve as ombudsman of Texas Monthly after Tim Taliaferro, then the editor-in-chief, drew media criticism for allegedly entering into an arrangement with Bumble. According to Columbia Journalism Review, Bumble founder Whitney Wolfe Herd would appear on the cover in exchange for a $25,000–30,000 social-media push by the dating company. Taliaferro denied there was any arrangement, saying the cover decision had been made before the social-media push was discussed. Taliaferro was hired after Hobby’s private equity firm, Genesis Park Partners, bought the magazine in October 2016.

After Oppel served briefly as ombudsman, Hobby announced that Oppel would become interim editor-in-chief of the Monthly on May 5, 2018.

In March 2020, Oppel was named editorial advisor of a digital news start-up, Austonia.com, founded by CEO and publisher Mark Dewey. The news site covers news, features and entertainment in Austin.

== Awards and achievements ==
Oppel has served as vice president of the Florida Society of Newspaper Editors, president of the North Carolina Press Association, and chair of the North Carolina First Amendment Association. He served as a member and then chair of the Journalism Advisory Committee of the Knight Foundation, a $2 billion foundation that distributed grants to journalism organizations and supported the transformation of the industry toward digital news with high standards. In 2000–2001, he was president of the American Society of Newspaper Editors, the largest organization of newspaper editors. At that time, the membership was 600. From 2000 until 2009, he was a member of the Pulitzer Prize Board and, in 2008–2009, was co-chair of the board.

While editor of The Charlotte Observer, Oppel led that newspaper to win two Pulitzer Prizes for Meritorious Public Service – the gold medals – considered the highest prize in journalism. The first, awarded in 1981, was for “Brown Lung: A Case of Deadly Neglect,” an investigation of how cotton dust in textile mills caused the disease of byssinosis among workers. In 1988, The Observer won its second Meritorious Public Service medal for revealing misuse of funds by the PTL television ministry operated by Jim and Tammy Faye Bakker. Longtime Observer editorial cartoonist Doug Marlette also won a Pulitzer in 1988, for work he did at The Observer and The Atlanta Constitution. Three of the five Pulitzers in The Observer's history were won under Oppel’s tenure. When The Observer and the afternoon Charlotte News merged news staffs in 1983, Oppel became editor of both newspapers until the News's demise in 1985.

Oppel was given the Distinguished Alumni Award by the University of South Florida in 1979, and received the 1987 Ben Bradlee Editor of the Year Award from the National Press Association.

== Family ==
Oppel is married to Carol Van Aken Oppel, a licensed lay preacher in the Episcopal Diocese of Texas. Previously, she was a freelance writer for religious publications. Their son, Richard A. Oppel Jr., is a national correspondent for The New York Times. Their daughter, Shelby Oppel Wood, is a former columnist for The Oregonian in Portland and now works as a freelance contributor to advertising and public relations agencies. She and her husband Nate Wood, a scientist with the United States Geological Survey, are the parents of two daughters, Elektra and Roxanne.
