= Kayla Tausche =

American journalist

- Born: Kayla McCall Tausche; July 17, 1986 (age 40); Minneapolis, Minnesota
- Education: University of North Carolina at Chapel Hill (BA)
- Occupations: Broadcast journalist Political correspondent
- Employer: CNN (formerly)
- Spouse: Jeff Izant (m. 2015)
- Children: 3

Kayla McCall Tausche (/ˈtaʊʃi/, born July 17, 1986) is an American broadcast journalist. She reported for CNBC from 2011 to 2023. She was with CNN as senior White House correspondent from July 2023 to May 2025, and was based in Washington, D.C.

== Early life ==
Tausche was born in Minneapolis, Minnesota. She graduated from Greater Atlanta Christian School in Norcross, Georgia in 2004. She then attended University of North Carolina at Chapel Hill, earning a bachelor's degree in 2008 in business journalism and international politics. She received honors for in-depth research for analyzing the way international newspapers covered the handover of Hong Kong from British to Chinese rule.

While at UNC, Tausche was a member of the cheerleading team.

== Career ==
During college, Tausche worked in the Brussels bureau of the Associated Press.

After graduation, Tausche covered consumer and retail news at Bloomberg L.P., then joined the DealReporter unit of Mergermarket. While at DealReporter, Tausche was a frequent guest on CNBC and CNBC World to discuss mergers and acquisitions.

Tausche joined CNBC in January 2011 as a general assignment reporter covering corporate finance and deals for CNBC's business day programming. She is also a contributor to MSNBC, Today, Weekend Today, and NBC Nightly News with Brian Williams. Tausche has received acclaim for her coverage of various high-profile stories. The Financial Times featured a picture of Tausche with media mogul Rupert Murdoch on its front page while she covered the News Corporation phone hacking scandal.

Her analysis and reports on the Facebook IPO filing received wide coverage by numerous outlets.

Tausche served as a substitute anchor for Squawk Box, Squawk on the Street and Power Lunch. and from May 2, 2014, until April 2017 she was a co-anchor of Squawk Alley. She has also appeared on Washington Week in Review.

On June 29, 2023, Tausche announced that she was leaving CNBC.

On July 24, 2023, CNN announced that Tausche would join as senior White House correspondent.

On May 8, 2025, Tausche departed CNN after two years with the network according to The Daily Beast. The reason behind her departure is unknown.

=== Comparison ===
Tausche's rise at CNBC has been compared to Erin Burnett, an anchor at CNN who once served as a popular host of two CNBC shows.

== Personal life ==
Tausche married Jeffrey Jacob Izant on April 11, 2015, at the Cathedral of Christ the King in Atlanta. Izant works as a lawyer. She and Izant have three children.

Tausche has run marathons. She sits on the alumni board of the University of North Carolina at Chapel Hill School of Journalism and Mass Communication.
