= Squawk on the Street =

American business news program

- Logo from 2014
- Genre: Business news
- Presented by: Carl Quintanilla (2011–present); David Faber (2005–present); Jim Cramer (2011–present); Sara Eisen (2014–2018; 2023–present)
- Country of origin: United States
- Original language: English

Production
- Production location: New York Stock Exchange
- Running time: 180 minutes

Original release
- Network: CNBC
- Release: December 19, 2005 – present

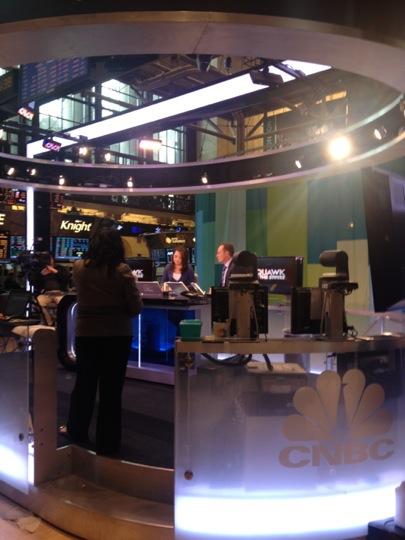
Studio set (Post 9) in NYSE during the Squawk on the Street (2012–present). This set is also shared with Squawk Alley and Closing Bell.

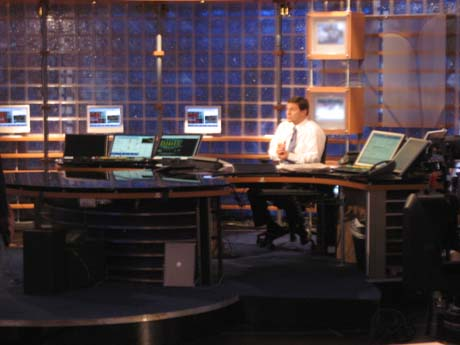
David Faber during the Squawk on the Street in 2007

Squawk on the Street, which debuted on December 19, 2005, is a business show on CNBC that follows the first 90 minutes of trading on Wall Street in the United States.

Originally airing as a one-hour program, the show doubled its airtime to two hours on July 19, 2007 (due in part to Liz Claman's departure from the network). This replaced the first hour of Morning Call (later renamed The Call on August 8, 2007), which aired one hour later and had its airtime reduced in half. On October 17, 2011, Squawk on the Street was expanded to 3 hours, from 9 am to noon ET. The Call was canceled as a result of this program's expansion. On May 19, 2014, Squawk on the Street reverted to 2 hours (9 am to 11 am ET) as a new program, Squawk Alley, debuted on that day. On February 27, 2023, Squawk on the Street once again expanded to three hours, with the third hour replacing the cancelled TechCheck but reverted back to being a two-hour show on December 11, 2023, following the debut of a new 11 am show, Money Movers. It expanded again to three hours following the cancellation of Money Movers on May 18, 2026.

== About the show ==
Squawk on the Street, which is seen at 9:00am ET, is broadcast live at the New York Stock Exchange. Mark Haines and Erin Burnett were the original co-anchors at the NYSE. Haines (the original host of Squawk Box), died on May 24, 2011, 18 days after Burnett left CNBC (May 6, 2011) to host CNN's Outfront (see below Mark Haines). David Faber (who also hosts and contributes to his "Faber Report" segments) originally reported from CNBC Global Headquarters, while Haines and Burnett were in the "Squawk Nest", or "Luxury Box" (as Haines called it) above the NYSE. Contributors include Bob Pisani (NYSE), Bertha Coombs and Scott Wapner. Coombs and Wapner were the original NASDAQ contributors, Wapner left the show in 2010 focusing to host on Fast Money Halftime Report and was replaced by Seema Mody. Leaving Coombs remained in that report along with Mody, were Sharon Epperson (NYMEX) and Rick Santelli (CME Group).

On July 11, 2011, Squawk on the Street debuted an entirely new anchor team at the NYSE. Carl Quintanilla (previously co-anchor of Squawk Box), Melissa Lee (anchor of Fast Money and Options Action) and Simon Hobbs (previously a presenter on CNBC Europe) were appointed as the new anchor team. Mad Money host Jim Cramer joined Quintanilla and Lee as a contributor for the first hour, with Hobbs joining Quintanilla and Lee as a third anchor for the duration. The following year (2012), Faber was moved from the network's Englewood Cliffs studio to a new trading-floor studio set (which replaced the old above-the-floor set that had been used since 2005) at the NYSE. The trading-floor studio set located in Post 9 at the NYSE, which debuted in 2012, is shared with Squawk Alley (later TechCheck) and Closing Bell.

On April 1, 2013, Lee was removed from her anchoring duties on Squawk on the Street and continues on as anchor of Fast Money and Options Action. On May 17, 2013, Kelly Evans (previously the co-anchor of Worldwide Exchange, which was originally based in CNBC Europe's headquarters at Fleet Place in London; then at the time, co-anchor of Closing Bell), became the new co-anchor of Squawk on the Street, her assignment began three days later. Evans officially left her anchoring duties to Closing Bell at the end of 2013 and was replaced by Sara Eisen, who was previously had a contributing role. Sara became a permanent co-anchor in May 2014.

On October 13, 2014, Squawk on the Street, along with CNBC's other trading-day programs, launched in full 1080i high-definition as part of a network-wide switch to a full 16:9 letterbox presentation on that same day.

From November 29, 2018 to February 17, 2023, Sara Eisen anchored Closing Bell, originally co-anchored along with Wilfred Frost until his departure from CNBC on February 16, 2022. Eisen had previously co-anchored Worldwide Exchange (also alongside Frost), from January 4, 2016 through March 9, 2018 and after that, Power Lunch from March 12, 2018 to November 28, 2018. Her position as co-anchor on Squawk on the Street was replaced by Morgan Brennan (formerly of Squawk Alley) on June 22, 2020. She returned to Squawk on the Street as co-anchor on February 21, 2023.

== Hosts ==
=== Current anchors ===
- Carl Quintanilla (2011–present)
- Sara Eisen (2014–2020, 2023–present)
- David Faber (2005–present)
- Jim Cramer (2011–present)

=== Former anchors ===
- Morgan Brennan (2020–2023), now anchor of Morning Call
- Erin Burnett (2005–2011), now anchor of her own program, Erin Burnett Outfront, on CNN
- Kelly Evans (2013–2014), now co-hosts Power Lunch and hosts her afternoon show, The Exchange
- Mark Haines (2005–2011), deceased
- Simon Hobbs (2011–2016)
- Melissa Lee (2011–2013), now hosts Closing Bell: Overtime

== Program format ==
The show begins with the co-anchors and Jim Cramer on the floor of the NYSE. The other market pre-open segments include the "Word on the Street" segment, in which either the co-anchors talk to a trader on the floor of the NYSE, and "Instant Analysis", in which either Quintanilla or Faber (or both) talk to an analyst either via satellite or on set.

Around the midway point of the show's first hour was originally the "Opening Bell Countdown", which had a countdown clock on the lower right of the screen. However, since Cramer joined Squawk on the Street in July 2011, the "Opening Bell Countdown" segment has been replaced with "Cramer's Mad Dash". After the opening bells ring at the NYSE and NASDAQ MarketSite, Quintanilla, Cramer and Faber send viewers through the opening minutes of the trading day with the "Opening Buzz" segment (see below). The show originally ended with the anchors looking at the "Stocks to Watch".

== Current and previous segments ==
- Jim Cramer, if he's on the set, talks to the Squawk Box hosts, usually 5–10 minutes before the show starts.
- Around the Horn: A brief summary of pre-market news; seen at the start of the show.
- The Rundown: This segment (seen just after the start of each hour of the show) starts with Bob Pisani on the floor at the NYSE, then continues with market reporters at the NASDAQ, the NYMEX and in Chicago (usually Santelli). Each of the reporters narrate pre-market news headlines in turn.
- Word on the Street: A market pre-open segment in which Haines or Burnett (or both) talk to an analyst on the floor of the NYSE.
- Instant Analysis: A market pre-open segment in which Haines or Burnett (or both) talk to an analyst either via satellite or on set, similar to the "Word on the Street" segment mentioned above.
- The Faber Report: This segment features David Faber tracking the US companies and stocks making news. This segment, however, is not seen when Faber is off, or on assignment.
- Five for Five: Seen on Mondays during the first hour with Jon Hilsenrath from The Wall Street Journal, who tells the anchors on set his five things to look for throughout the week.
- Cramer's Mad Dash: Introduced in July 2011, Faber and Jim Cramer look at the stocks making news at the pre-open.
- Opening Bell Countdown: This segment, which has a countdown clock on the lower right of the screen where the network bug is usually seen (also used on Closing Bell), features final pre-open thoughts (time permitting), as well as the ringing of the opening bells at the NYSE and NASDAQ.
- Opening Buzz: After the opening bells ring at the NYSE and NASDAQ, Haines and Burnett send viewers through the opening minutes of the trading day with reporters at the NYSE, NASDAQ, NYMEX, and so on. This is very similar to the aforementioned "Rundown" segment, as explained above.
- Weekly Energy Inventory Data: Seen at 10:30am ET on Wednesdays and Thursdays, Sharon Epperson reports from the NYMEX on the weekly energy inventory data for crude oil, gasoline, distillates, refinery capacity (on Wednesdays) and natural gas (on Thursdays). This segment, which formerly aired during the now-discontinued first hour of The Call (formerly Morning Call), is now seen during the second hour of Squawk on the Street as of 2007-07-25.
- Six in 60: This segment gives the show's anchors (Haines and Burnett) 60 seconds to look at the 6 stocks viewers are watching. This one-minute segment debuted on the 2007-03-06 broadcast.
- News Update: News headlines from outside the world of business, broadcast at 10:30 am ET.
- West Coast Wake-Up: Seen during the second hour, a guest from the West Coast joins the program.
- Inside the Numbers: CNBC's Steve Liesman breaks down the day's economic numbers.
- Cash Crop: CNBC's West Coast-based reporter Jane Wells takes a weekly look at how crops are affecting the businesses, the economy, and the industry. Seen on Thursdays.
- Squawk Around the World: This occasional segment, which debuted on 2008-04-09, takes a look at the economic diaries of different regions outside of the US.
- The European Close: This segment, which debuted on October 17, 2011 following the cancellation of The Call at 11:30 am ET, on the last 30 minutes of the show. Simon Hobbs reports on closing of the European stocks. This segment was moved to Squawk Alley on May 19, 2014.
- "Stop Trading!": This segment, which previously aired on the US version of Street Signs, was moved to the end of this program's first hour on February 9, 2015.

== See also ==
- Squawk Box (a CNBC US program that precedes this one)
- Squawk Australia (a CNBC Asia program, no longer on air, anchored from Sydney, which followed a similar format)
- Squawk Alley (a CNBC US program, also no longer on air, that followed this one)
- TechCheck (a CNBC US program, also no longer on air, that followed this one)
