= Kay Burley (TV programme) =

Breakfast television news programme

- Also known as: Sky News Breakfast
- Genre: Breakfast television programme
- Presented by: Kay Burley (Mon–Thu); Anna Jones (Fri)
- Countries of origin: United Kingdom (Broadcast internationally)
- Original language: English

Production
- Production locations: Four Millbank, Westminster
- Camera setup: Multi-camera
- Running time: 240 minutes

Original release
- Network: Sky News
- Release: 14 October 2019 – 5 February 2025

Related
- The Early Rundown

Sky News Breakfast (previously Kay Burley @ Breakfast) is a British breakfast television programme that airs Monday to Friday from 6-10 am on Sky News. The show launched on Monday, 14 October 2019 as part of a replacement for long-running breakfast show Sunrise, which also includes The Early Rundown.

The show is presented from Sky's Westminster studios at Four Millbank.

== History ==
Sky News announced on 23 September 2019 that they were introducing a new breakfast show to replace Sunrise, called Kay Burley @ Breakfast.

The show initially ran Monday to Thursday only and from 7-9 am live from Sky News's Westminster studios at Four Millbank, and unlike Sunrise, was hosted solely by Burley, with no separate news or sports anchors.

The show first aired on 14 October 2019, with Burley presenting from Abingdon Green in Westminster, with the weather being presented from Studio 21 at Osterley by Kirsty McCabe.

In September 2020, the show was renamed Kay Burley, being presented by Burley from Monday to Friday from a revamped Westminster set.

On 10 December 2020, Burley stepped back from presenting the show for six months, as a result of breaching London's tier 2 coronavirus restrictions. The Kay Burley breakfast show format remains in place but was branded as Sky News Breakfast on programme guides. However the show continued to be broadcast from Sky News's Westminster studios and retained the same format and running order.

Niall Paterson hosted the programme Monday to Thursday from December 2020 until March 2021, with Stephen Dixon covering Paterson's role on The Early Rundown. The pair switched duties as of April 2021 with Dixon hosting in Burley's absence.

As of June 2021, the Kay Burley branding reappeared following Burley's return to the channel.

From early January 2021 until June 2021, Gillian Joseph regularly hosted the programme on Fridays.

In January 2024 the show was given a new look, with Burley continuing as main presenter, but joined by presenters Gareth Barlow, Wilfred Frost and political correspondent Mhari Aurora. The show was increased by one hour to start at 6 am, however Burley continued presenting between 7-10am.

On 5 February 2025, Burley announced her retirement 36 years, to the day, after her first day with Sky News. That morning's broadcast would be her final. The following day the programme returned to the generic Sky News Breakfast branding.

== On-Air Team ==
=== Current presenters ===
Presenter	Role
Kay Burley	Main Presenter, Monday-Thursday
Anna Jones	Main Presenter, Friday
Gareth Barlow	Second Presenter, Monday-Friday
Jacqui Beltrao	Sports Presenter, Friday
Leah Boleto	Relief Presenter
Wilfred Frost	Relief Presenter
Jayne Secker	Relief Presenter

Preceded by The Early Rundown	Sky News weekday schedule 06:00–10:00	Succeeded by Ian King Live
