= Closing Bell =

American TV program on CNBC

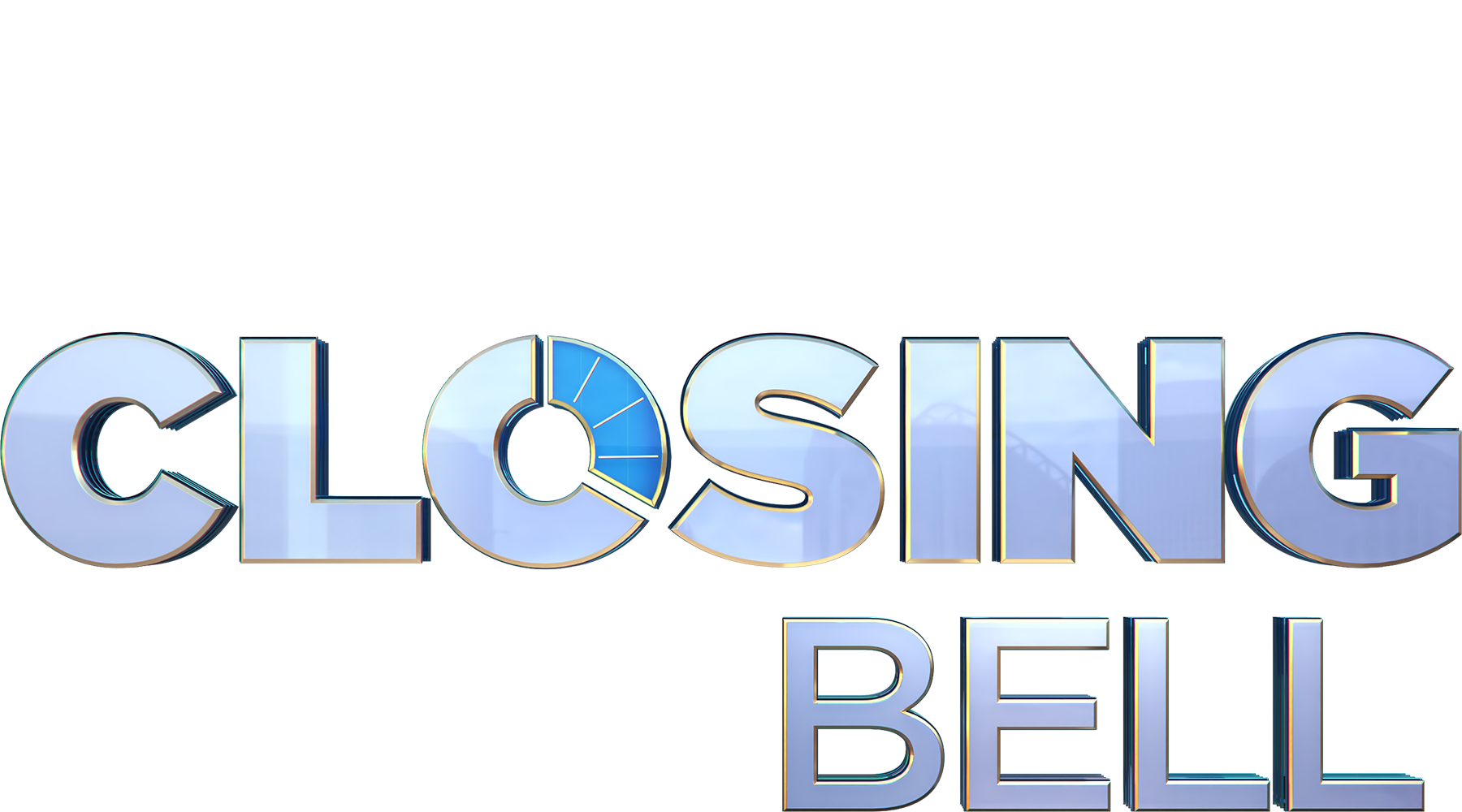
- Genre: Business news program
- Presented by: Scott Wapner
- Country of origin: United States
- Original language: English

Production
- Running time: 60 minutes

Original release
- Network: CNBC
- Release: February 4, 2002 – present

Related
- Market Wrap; Closing Bell: Overtime

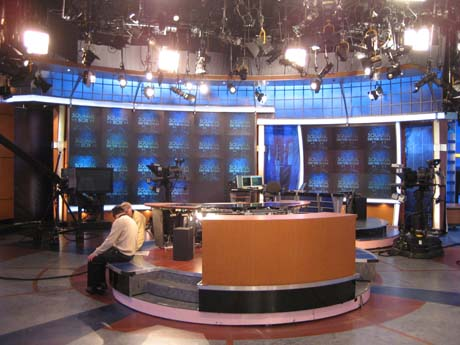
Closing Bell broadcast set

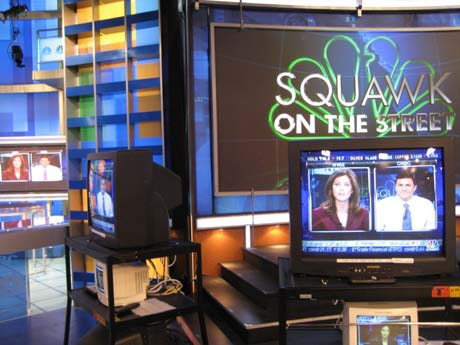
Closing Bell screen wall

Former logo from October 13, 2014

Closing Bell can refer to two CNBC programs: the original Closing Bell on CNBC (which debuted on February 4, 2002) and European Closing Bell on CNBC Europe (which was cancelled on December 18, 2015).

The show is named after the bell that is rung to signify the end of a trading session on the New York Stock Exchange which occurs at 4:00 pm EST. Many exchanges used to signify end of trading with a gong or bell when they were operated on an open outcry basis. The New York Stock Exchange still uses this system and often invites special guests to ring the bell.

The CNBC shows use this name as they cover the period up to the end of trading and review the trading of the day after the market has closed.

== About the show ==
=== History ===
Closing Bell airs on CNBC between 3pm and 4pm, Eastern Time. The program is anchored by Scott Wapner at the NYSE.

Maria Bartiromo was the original anchor of the show ran from 3-5pm ET until she departed from the network on November 22, 2013 to join the Fox Business Network. During the 4-5pm block, Maria said with the phrase, "it is 4 O'Clock on Wall Street - do you know where your money is?". Bartiromo's role was replaced with Kelly Evans following the former's aforementioned departure. Like her predecessor, Evans anchored the 4-5pm ET block. Tyler Mathisen was the former co-anchor from 3-4pm ET (originally from 4-5pm ET), until he was promoted in 2005. That same year, Dylan Ratigan took over the 3-4pm ET co-anchoring duties until his departure from the network in March 2009. Starting January 2011, Bill Griffeth became co-anchor after co-anchoring Power Lunch since 1996–2009 and taking a 1-year leave of absence. On March 12, 2018, Griffeth moved to PBS' Nightly Business Report to reunite with his former Power Lunch co-anchor, Sue Herera, while Frost (formerly co-anchor of Worldwide Exchange) replaced Griffeth as Kelly Evans' co-anchor of Closing Bell.

In 2012, Closing Bell moved to a new trading-floor studio set inside Post 9 at the NYSE, which is shared with two other CNBC American shows, Squawk on the Street and Money Movers (formerly Squawk Alley and later, TechCheck). On October 13, 2014, Closing Bell, along with CNBC's other trading-day programs, were launched in full 1080i high-definition as part of a network-wide switch to a full 16:9 letterbox presentation.

On November 30, 2018, Sara Eisen (also at the time, co-anchor of Squawk on the Street), who filled in for Kelly Evans while the latter was on away maternity leave, took over Evans' role permanently, with Wilfred Frost also co-anchoring both hours of the show with Eisen. By coincidence, both Frost and Eisen had previously co-anchored Worldwide Exchange for 2 years. Following Frost's departure on February 16, 2022, Michael Santoli became co-anchor and held that post until March 14, when Eisen became the sole anchor of Closing Bell, which itself had its runtime halved from two hours to one hour. Closing Bell: Overtime, anchored by Scott Wapner, replaced the second hour of Closing Bell, also on March 14.

On February 21, 2023, Wapner moved to Closing Bell, replacing Sara Eisen, the latter of whom returned to Squawk on the Street to replace Morgan Brennan, who in turn, moved to Closing Bell: Overtime. Jon Fortt, previously a co-anchor of the now-cancelled TechCheck, joined Brennan as co-anchor of Closing Bell: Overtime. Also on February 21, production of Closing Bell: Overtime was relocated to CNBC's Global Headquarters in Englewood Cliffs, New Jersey.

On January 20, 2026, production of Closing Bell: Overtime was moved to the NASDAQ MarketSite, where it shares the same set as the show that follows it, Fast Money. To coincide with the move, Michael Santoli, who previously co-anchored Closing Bell for one month in 2022, returned as co-anchor of Closing Bell: Overtime, alongside Fast Money host Melissa Lee. They replaced Jon Fortt and Morgan Brennan, the latter of whom moved to Worldwide Exchange, which was replaced on March 23, 2026 by a revived Morning Call.

=== Content ===
The program covers the last hour of trading in the US stock markets, covering the closing bells of the NYSE and NASDAQ Stock Market at 4pm ET. Bob Pisani provides live reports from the floor of the New York Stock Exchange. Scott Wapner provided live reports from the NASDAQ until becoming the host of CNBC Halftime Report (his role has since been filled by Bertha Coombs).

At around 3:50p EST, the segment “Closing Bell: Market Zone” begins. This segment includes the latest business news and what’s moved the markets that day, plus expert analysis until the close at 4P EST. This segment is divided into sections which are shown in a lower-third which shows upcoming topics along with a text box. When this segment begins, a sidebar appears on the right, showing the major indexes, and stocks moving the market. Along with that, on the top is a countdown clock, which replaces the one which appears on the bottom where the bug normally is and starts at 3P EST and stops when the Market Zone starts.

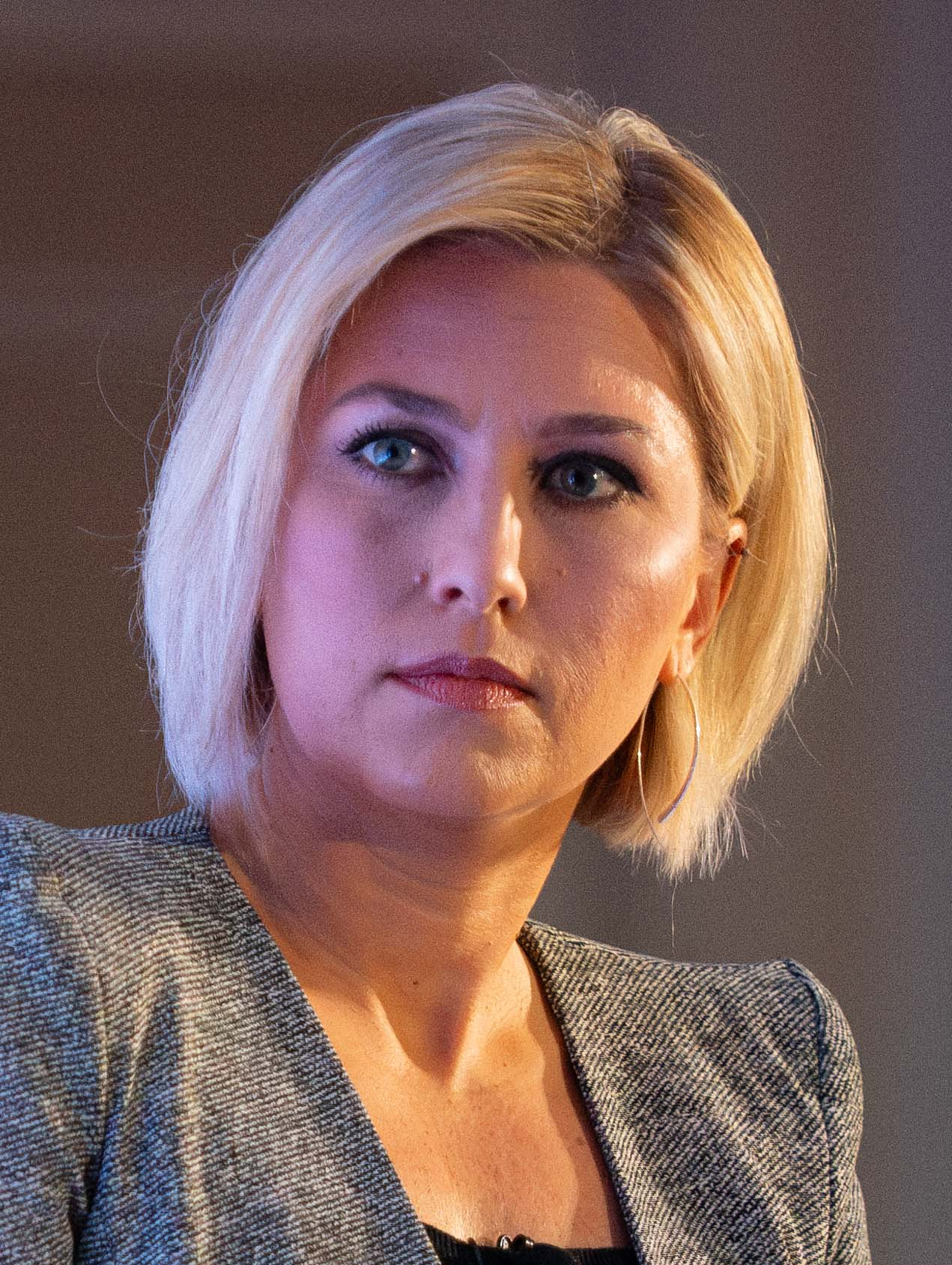
Morgan Brennan, Co-Anchor of CNBC Closing Bell: Overtime in 2024

After 4pm ET, the show's name changes to Closing Bell: Overtime and this hour features analysis of the day's winners and losers, company results that are issued after the close of trade, and other business news. This hour is presented by Michael Santoli and Melissa Lee.

== Hosts ==
=== Current anchors ===
- Melissa Lee (2026—present)
- Michael Santoli (February–March 2022; 2026—present)
- Scott Wapner (2023–present)

=== Former anchors ===
- Maria Bartiromo (2002–2013), now anchor of Mornings with Maria on Fox Business
- Morgan Brennan (2023–2026), now anchor of Morning Call
- Sara Eisen (2018–2023), now co-anchor of Squawk on the Street
- Kelly Evans (2013–2018), now anchor of The Exchange and co-anchor of Power Lunch
- Jon Fortt (2023–2025)
- Wilfred Frost (2018–2022), now at Sky News
- Bill Griffeth (2011–2018), now retired; was previously co-anchor of Nightly Business Report until its end in late December 2019
- Tyler Mathisen (2002–2005), was most recently co-anchor of Power Lunch until December 20, 2024
- Dylan Ratigan (2006–2009), along with Closing Bell, formerly hosted Fast Money; he then hosted The Dylan Ratigan Show on MSNBC from 2009–2012; since then, he is no longer active in the television industry

== Worldwide Closing Bell ==
Around CNBC's global branches, there are many counterparts of Closing Bell in the world:

Channel	Program	Still Run?	Replacement
CNBC Europe	European Closing Bell	(2003-06-02—2015-12-18)	Squawk Alley
CNBC Europe	Frankfurt Closing Bell	(2003-06-02—2004-09-10)	Europe Tonight
CNBC-e	Son Baskı	(2000—present)	N/A
CNBC-TV18	Closing Bell / NSE Closing Bell	(2005—present)	N/A
Nikkei CNBC	Nikkei CNBC Closing Bell	(2004—present)	N/A
Class-CNBC	Linea Mercati Pomeriggio (European close)	(?—present)	N/A
Class-CNBC	Linea Mercati Notte (US close)	(?—present)	N/A
CNBC Arabiya	Jalsat Al Amal	(2003—present)	N/A
SBS-CNBC	Closing Bell	(2009—present)	N/A
CNBC Indonesia	Closing Bell Indonesia	(2018—present)	N/A

As the major Asian markets all close at different times, there is no "Asian Closing Bell". The equivalent programme is Worldwide Exchange, which replaced Asia Market Wrap on 2005-12-19.

== See also ==
- Asia Market Wrap (discontinued after 2005-12-16)
- European Closing Bell (discontinued after 2015-12-18)
- Europe Tonight (discontinued after 2010-03-01)
- Europe This Week
- Countdown to the Closing Bell (a Fox Business Network program aired from 3-4 ET the same timeslot)
- Closing Bell: Overtime
