= TechCheck =

American business news program

- Genre: Business news
- Presented by: Carl Quintanilla; Jon Fortt; Deirdre Bosa
- Country of origin: United States
- Original language: English

Production
- Production locations: New York Stock Exchange and San Francisco
- Running time: 60 minutes

Original release
- Network: CNBC
- Release: April 12, 2021 – February 17, 2023

TechCheck is an American business news program that aired on CNBC from April 12, 2021, to February 17, 2023. It was broadcast live Monday through Friday from 11:00 a.m to 12:00 p.m Eastern Time from a trading-floor set inside Post 9 at the New York Stock Exchange, which is shared with Squawk on the Street and Closing Bell, and from CNBC's studios in San Francisco.

== History ==
In February 2021, CNBC announced it would replace Squawk Alley with a new hour-long program called TechCheck. It would retain the hour's focus on technology and continue to examine both prominent names as well as emerging public companies in the field, but also broaden its scope to cover changes in different sectors including energy, gaming, transportation, and media. Originally set to air on April 5, 2021, the program's premiere was postponed by one week to April 12.

TechCheck aired its last show on February 17, 2023 and was replaced by a third hour of Squawk on the Street although the name lives on as a brief segment aired towards the end of the final hour of Squawk on the Street.
