= Squawk Alley =

American business news program airing on CNBC

- Squawk Alley intro
- Genre: Business news
- Presented by: Carl Quintanilla (2014–2021); Jon Fortt (2014–2021)
- Country of origin: United States
- Original language: English

Production
- Production location: New York Stock Exchange
- Running time: 60 minutes

Original release
- Network: CNBC
- Release: May 19, 2014 – April 9, 2021

Related
- TechCheck

Squawk Alley was an American business news program that aired on CNBC from 11:00 a.m to 12:00 p.m Eastern Time. It premiered on May 19, 2014 and ended on April 9, 2021. It was broadcast live Monday through Friday from a trading-floor set inside Post 9 at the New York Stock Exchange, which is shared with Squawk on the Street and Closing Bell.

== History ==
In May 2014, CNBC announced it would launch a new hourlong program called Squawk Alley that would air at 11 a.m. Eastern Time, replacing the third hour of Squawk on the Street. It would focus on technology news and discuss the growing influence of technology innovation and investment on Wall Street and the global economy. The network named Squawk on the Street host Carl Quintanilla, on-air tech editor Jon Fortt, and reporter Kayla Tausche as the three co-hosts who would lead the program. Squawk Alley debuted on May 19, 2014.

In February 2017, Tausche departed the program after she became a correspondent for the network's Washington bureau. Morgan Brennan joined the program as a co-anchor in April 2018 but was re-assigned to Squawk on the Street in June 2020.

In February 2021, CNBC announced it would replace Squawk Alley with a new hour-long program called TechCheck. It would retain the hour's focus on technology and continue to examine both prominent names as well as emerging public companies in the field, but also broaden its scope to cover changes in different sectors including energy, gaming, transportation, and media. Originally set to air on April 5, 2021, the program's premiere was postponed by one week to April 12.

== On-air staff ==
- Carl Quintanilla (2014–2021)
- Jon Fortt (2014–2021)
- Kayla Tausche (2014–2017)
- Morgan Brennan (2018–2020)

== See also ==
- Squawk Box
- Squawk on the Street
- TechCheck (a successor to this program)
