= Simon Hobbs =

British-born journalist

Simon Hobbs is a British-born financial advisor who emigrated to the USA in 2009 and became an American citizen in 2018.

He is part of California Financial Partners. Being independent, his business is not directed by a bank and instead he employs LPL Financial as his broker dealer.

He worked for business news channel CNBC for 18 years, first in London and then at the New York Stock Exchange and for five years he was a co-anchor of the 10am hour of Squawk on the Street until his departure from CNBC in July 2016 when he continued hosting conferences.

== Biography ==
Hobbs joined California Financial Partners in 2018 and gained his professional licensing exams in 2019.

CFP is based in Glendale, California and is a Registered Investment Advisor offering comprehensive, fee-based financial planning and strategic wealth management. It also offers Security and Advisory services through LPL Financial. Member FINRA & SIPC.

Hobbs built his wealth management business in Palm Springs as a local CFP satellite office.

He hosted an international tax podcast for EY (formerly Ernst & Young) called ‘Tax & Law in Focus’.

He is Membership Chair for Indian Wells Rotary Club, Ambassador for the Desert Business Association, and a prominent member of the Rancho Mirage Chamber of Commerce.

Hobbs is best known for working as a main anchor for CNBC, and was with the channel from 1998 to 2016.

Before joining CNBC he worked for LBC news radio in the UK for 8 years, rising from reporter to executive producer, with stints at BBC Radio 4 and BBC Radio 1's Newsbeat.

For CNBC Europe, Hobbs initially co-anchored Squawk Box Europe and also anchored Europe Today and its replacement Today's Business was the first show to totally interact with new video wall technology.

In 2003 Hobbs switched to afternoons, hosting European Closing Bell and Europe Tonight. He hosted European Closing Bell and Europe Tonight until Guy Johnson became host of both shows in March 2007.

In 2007 AIB awarded Hobbs 'International Presenter of the Year – Television' for being "polished, passionate and enthused"

From March 2007 to July 2009 Hobbs produced and anchored 66 episodes of globetrotting interview series The Leaders which was shown as inflight entertainment on 10 airlines and released by NBC Universal as both a DVD and for digital download.

In conjunction with CNBC Europe's two major advertisers, BT Global and Royal Dutch Shell, Hobbs was sent around the world to host live TV debates. He also hosted international events for the European Union, World Bank and UN agencies.

In 2009 CNBC relocated him to their USA headquarters to prevent him from relaunching rival Bloomberg TV. The Financial Times wrote at the time "Anyone familiar with Simon Hobbs’ interviewing style will know that he is no corporate lackey. Quite the contrary, in fact — he’s tough, to the point".

Initially Hobbs reported extensively across the US network on the unfolding European debt crisis, with fill-in anchor slots, until he was assigned co-anchoring duties on Squawk on the Street in 2011, where he co-hosted the program's second hour.

In addition to anchoring the 10am ET hour for CNBC USA, Hobbs also delivered a daily wrap of the European Market Close at 11.30am ET and covered CNBC's travel beat, reporting extensively on the lodging and cruise line industries, along with the giant online travel agencies. And anchored two seasons of 'Executive Vision' sponsored by Credit Suisse.

On 18 August 2011, at the height of the Euro Zone crisis, Hobbs made headlines when he challenged his CNBC colleague Jim Cramer on air for inaccurately suggesting that the French banks were about to go under, which could have had devastating consequences for the world's financial system.

On June 27, 2014, during his CNBC program "Squawk on the Street," Hobbs accidentally re-"outed" Apple CEO Tim Cook as gay. Tim Cook was already "out," based on his appearance in out.com's Power List 2013. Cook later publicly confirmed that he is gay in an opinion piece advocating for human rights and equality.

On August 18, 2014, Hobbs accepted the ALS ice water bucket challenge from Carnival CEO Arnold Donald and was drenched by co-anchor Sara Eisen outside the NYSE. He in turn challenged the CEOs of Priceline, Marriott and GoPro who all then accepted.

His last day on CNBC U.S. was July 29, 2016.

== See also ==
- List of CNBC personalities
