= Kelly Evans =

American journalist and news anchor (born 1985)

- Born: Kelly Evans; July 17, 1985 (age 41); Syracuse, New York, U.S.
- Education: Washington and Lee University (BA)
- Occupations: News anchor, journalist
- Years active: 2007–present
- Spouse: Eric Chemi (m. 2017)
- Children: 6

Kelly Evans (born July 17, 1985) is an American journalist and co-anchor of Power Lunch on the CNBC business news channel. She was previously based in CNBC Europe's London, England, headquarters from May 2012 to May 2013 and is now based in CNBC's headquarters in New Jersey. Prior to joining CNBC, she was an economics reporter at The Wall Street Journal where she wrote the "Ahead of the Tapes" column, wrote for "Heard on the Street", and hosted the daily "News Hub" on WSJ.com. Before joining CNBC, she was a regular guest on various television news programs.

== Background ==
Evans was born in Syracuse, New York, and raised in Lexington, Virginia, Rockbridge County, near the Blue Ridge Mountains. At Rockbridge County High School, she earned eight letters in lacrosse, cross country, and track.

She then attended Washington and Lee University where she was a George Washington Honor Scholar with a full-ride academic scholarship and graduated magna cum laude with a bachelor's degree in business journalism. She was a four-time scholar athlete, co-captain of the women's lacrosse team (First Team All-State, First Team All-ODAC, and First Team All-Region selections) and was elected to membership in the national leadership honor society Omicron Delta Kappa.

On April 22, 2017, she married CNBC's sports reporter, Eric Chemi. They have six children together.

== Career ==
Evans started at the Wall Street Journal in 2007, covering real estate and economics. She also worked there as a reporter for the Global Economics bureau. Evans was one of the moderators for a 2012 Republican Primary debate in Myrtle Beach, South Carolina. She also moderated a James Carville v. Ann Coulter debate, part of the 25th annual Washington and Lee Mock Convention. She has been compared to former CNBC host Erin Burnett, who left the cable business channel to anchor a news program on CNN.

At CNBC, Evans co-hosted Closing Bell following the departure of Maria Bartiromo in 2013 until 2018 when CNBC moved Evans to their new show, The Exchange. Sara Eisen would replace Evans as co-host of Closing Bell.
