= Europe Tonight =

Television series

- Genre: business news, analysis
- Presented by: Guy Johnson (2007-2009); Anna Edwards (2008-2009); Simon Hobbs (2004-2007); Silvia Wadhwa (2004-2007); Nigel Roberts (1998-2000); Sarah Clements (1999-2001)
- Country of origin: United Kingdom
- Original language: English

Production
- Running time: 30 minutes (prior to 2007); 60 minutes (after mid-2007)

Original release
- Network: CNBC Europe
- Release: 1998 – 12 January 2001; 13 September 2004 – December 2009

Related
- 1998-2001: Frankfurt Closing Bell; 1998-2001: European Market Wrap 2004-2009: Power Lunch

Europe Tonight was an evening television business news programme which was broadcast on CNBC Europe from 2004 to 2009. The programme was presented by various anchors over the years, including Guy Johnson, Silvia Wadhwa, Simon Hobbs, and Anna Edwards.

== History ==
The original Europe Tonight was a 30-minute market review broadcast on weekdays at 6:30pm CET until 2001. The programme was relaunched in September 2004, and replaced Frankfurt Closing Bell, which was shown at 8pm CET and co-presented from the Frankfurt Stock Exchange by Silvia Wadhwa and by Simon Hobbs in London. Until 2004, the Deutsche Börse remained open later than the other European markets – until 20:00 CET.

The programme time, previously filled by updates on late German trade was replaced by interviews with Frankfurt-based strategists, commentators and CEOs. The remainder of this version of the programme was essentially an update of European Closing Bell, in which Hobbs reviewed the day's business events and covered any late breaking news.

The programme length was extended from 30 minutes to one hour in 2007. Johnson was installed as presenter, the show was given a new title sequence and its theme music was changed from that formerly used by Closing Bell to that used by Street Signs before December 2005. The format of the programme was heavily revamped, gaining some of the segments previously contained in the second hour of European Closing Bell, such as a daily Guest Investor. New features introduced included The Editor, where the editor of a European business publication discussed how they will be covering notable events, and an update on the U.S. markets which came live from the NASDAQ MarketSite. Wadhwa no longer acted as co-host of Europe Tonight, but remained a contributor to the show. Anna Martin joined Johnson as co-host of the programme in January 2008, having previously been the show's regular reporter.

The show's timeslot was brought forward by an hour to 7pm CET from 4 February 2008.

Europe Tonight did not return after the 2009 Christmas holiday season.

== See also ==
- European Closing Bell
- Closing Bell
