= Send My Bag =

Northern Irish luggage shipping company

- Industry: Courier
- Founder: Adam Ewart
- Headquarters: Bangor, Northern Ireland
- Area served: Worldwide
- Services: Shipping & Luggage Delivery Service
- Website: https://www.sendmybag.com

Send My Bag is an international luggage shipping and relocation platform. Launched in the UK in 2006, the company now serves customers in over 80 countries each month.

== History ==
Send My Bag was formed after founder Adam Ewart was charged excess baggage fees when helping his girlfriend travel home from university. After paying the fee Ewart returned home and searched the web for a service which offered to deliver luggage at a lower cost. With nothing found, he decided to start Send My Bag. Setting up just one web page for under £100, he created a simple booking system for the business venture.

Prior to 2011 Send My Bag primarily existed as a niche luggage shipping service for students. From 2011 onwards, their focus broadened as airlines such as Ryanair in Europe and Spirit in the USA took additional steps to dissuade passengers from checking bags, and as airline revenue from baggage fees worldwide dramatically increased.

In September 2012, Ewart appeared on the BBC television program Dragons' Den in search of an investment for his door to door baggage service. In a 2020 interview with The Independent Ewart acknowledged the main motivation for going on the show was to raise awareness.

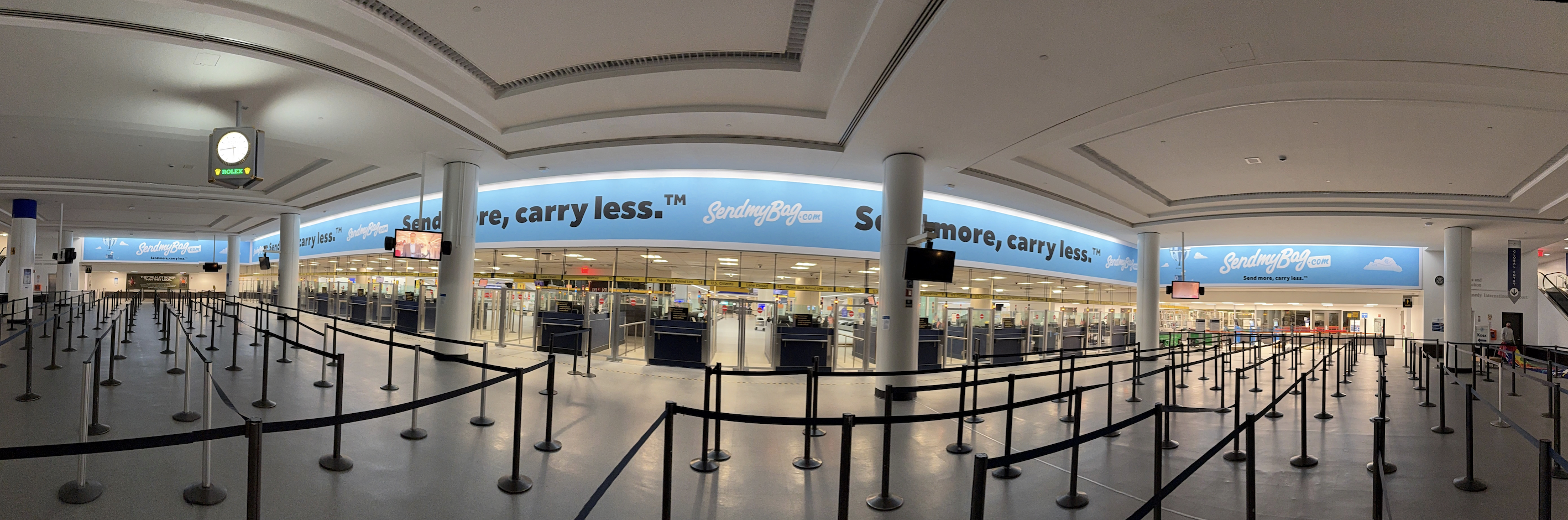
Send My Bag installation at John F. Kennedy International Airport.

Following the appearance on Dragons' Den, Send My Bag announced a £100k funding from investors Lough Shore Investments.

In November 2014 on CNBC's Power Lunch Ewart announced the launch of USA worldwide services. In 2015 Send My Bag further expanded launching a US domestic service and worldwide services from Australia.

== Sponsorships ==
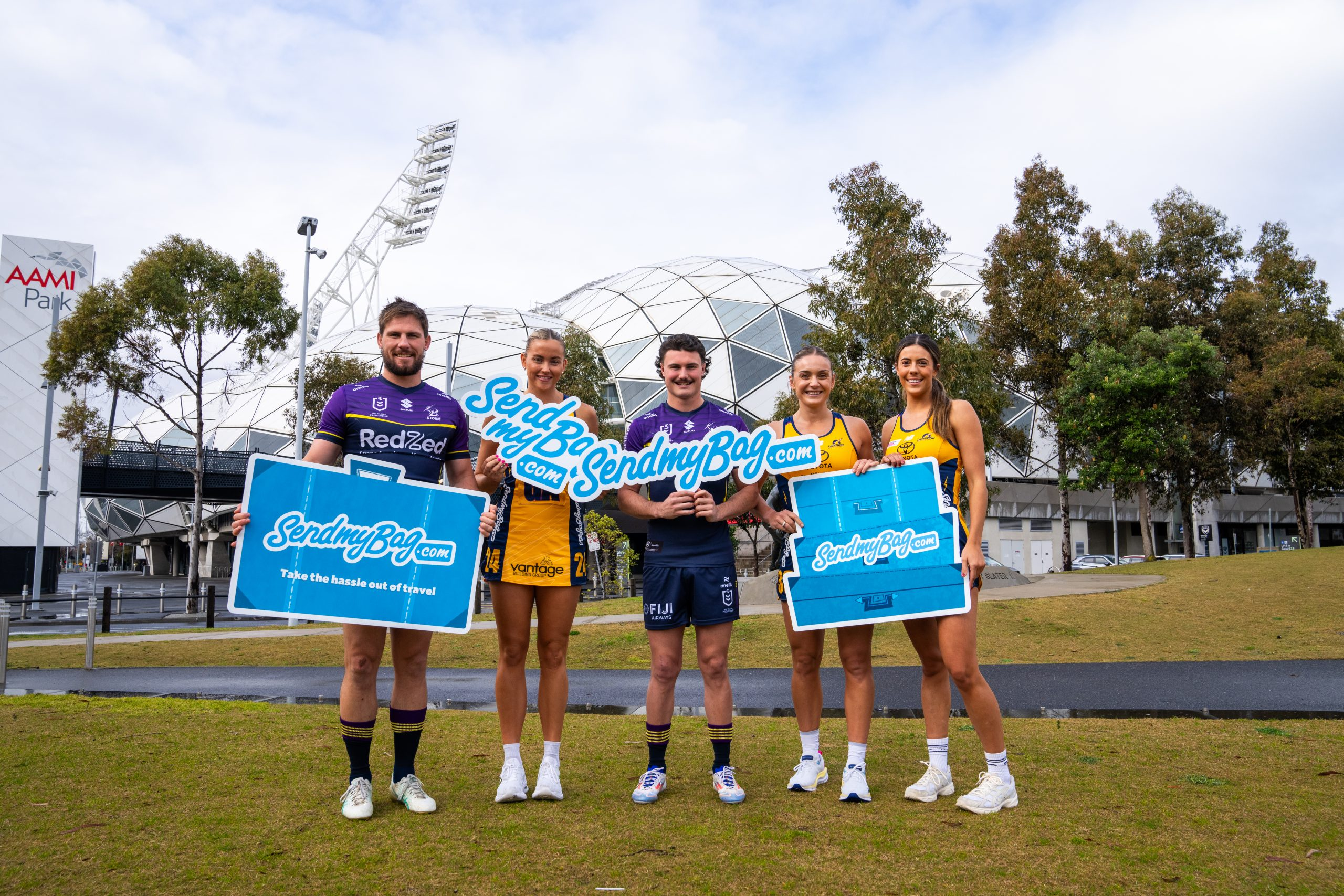
Melbourne Storm and Sunshine Coast Lightning launch Send My Bag partnership.

Send My Bag sponsors a number of sports teams including Melbourne Storm and Sunshine Coast Lightning in Australia, Ulster Rugby who compete in the international United Rugby Championship, the Northern Ireland Senior Men's and Women's international football teams, Bangor F.C. and the Belfast Giants.

Send My Bag was a sponsor of the UEFA European Under-19 Championship.

In 2025 Send My Bag was announced as title sponsor of a British Superbikes team in association with IWR and Honda.

== Charity Partnerships ==
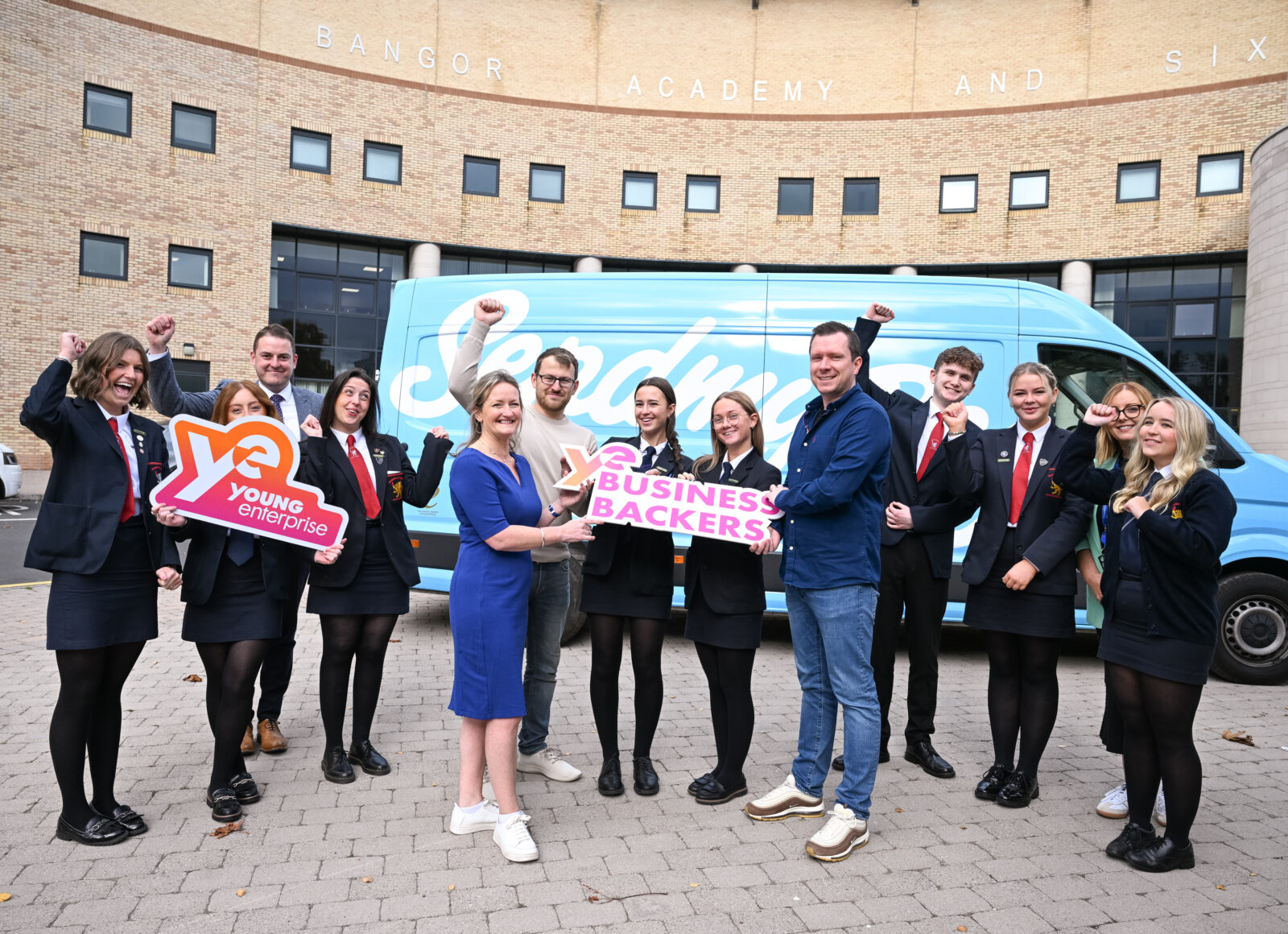
Send My Bag join Young Enterprise NI as lead partner.

After the children's education charity Young Enterprise NI lost government funding in 2023 it was announced in 2024 that Send My Bag would become their lead partner.

== Awards ==
In April 2018 Send My Bag was announced as winner of the Queen's Awards for Enterprise. At the time of winning the award Send My Bag had shipped 250,000 pieces of luggage in the previous 12 months. The company was awarded the Queen's Award for Enterprise for a second time in 2022.
