= Silvia Wadhwa =

German journalist

Silvia Wadhwa (born 1959 in Hagen) is a German financial journalist. She previously worked for CNBC Europe in Frankfurt. She reported daily from the Frankfurt Stock Exchange (usually on European Closing Bell and Europe Tonight), and provided German language business news updates for the N24 news channel. Wadhwa was also the network's European Central Bank correspondent, reporting from the bank's headquarters on days of Interest rate decisions and attending the subsequent press conferences. In December 2007 she began writing a blog, €urocentric, for CNBC.com.

== Biography ==
Having previously covered the German financial markets for organizations including Reuters and Handelsblatt, Wadhwa joined CNBC Europe in 1998 as a Frankfurt-based correspondent. Between 2003 and 2007, she was co-presenter of the evening programme Frankfurt Closing Bell and its successor Europe Tonight. Guy Johnson took over as Europe Tonight's sole host in a March 2007 revamp, but Wadhwa remained a contributor to the show.
