= Sophy Ridge =

British journalist (born 1984)

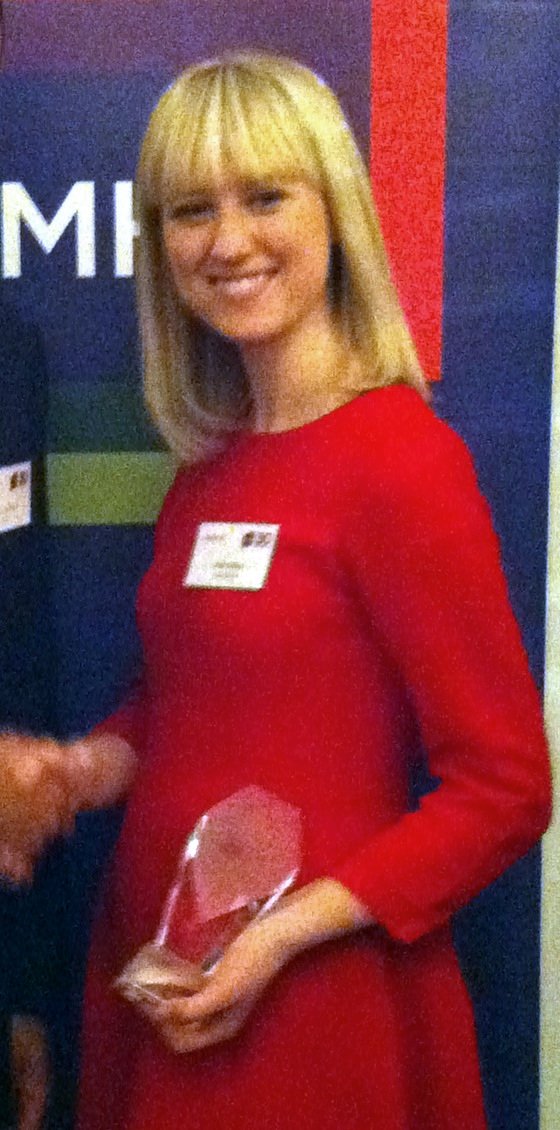
- Ridge in 2012
- Born: Sophy Ridge; 17 October 1984 (age 41); London, England
- Education: Tiffin Girls' School
- Alma mater: St Edmund Hall, Oxford (BA)
- Occupations: Journalist; presenter
- Children: 2

Sophy Ridge (born 16 October 1984) is an English television journalist. She has worked for Sky News since 2011.

Born in London, Ridge studied English Literature at St Edmund Hall, Oxford, before working for the tabloid newspaper News of the World. She left the newspaper to join Sky News as a political correspondent in 2011. Six years later, she started hosting her own politics show on the channel, Sophy Ridge on Sunday.

Ridge hosted the primetime show Politics Hub with Sophy Ridge from September 2023 to October 2025. She was also involved in the 2024 general election coverage on Sky News. Ridge began presenting Sky News Breakfast in November 2025 alongside Wilfred Frost.

== Early life ==
Ridge was born on 17 October 1984 in Richmond upon Thames, London. Both her parents are teachers. Ridge has one younger brother. Her secondary education was at the selective grammar Tiffin Girls' School in London. During her time there, she did work experience at the local newspaper, the Richmond and Twickenham Times.

She continued her education at St Edmund Hall, Oxford, and obtained a second-class BA degree in English Literature. During her final year of university, she did a period of work experience at the tabloid newspaper News of the World, which led to a position on their graduate training programme.

== Career ==
After graduation in 2006, Ridge was a trainee reporter at the News of the World. After completion of her training programmes she initially worked as a consumer affairs correspondent in 2009. She then gained a job as a political correspondent on Sky News in 2011.

Ridge covered the 2015 general election as a senior political correspondent for Sky News, reporting on the Labour Party's campaign and conducting interviews with party members. Her exclusives during this time included Ed Miliband's resignation as leader of the Labour Party following the result of that general election and Jeremy Corbyn's victory in the subsequent Labour Party leadership election.

In 2017 Ridge became the host of her own show, Sophy Ridge on Sunday. In the same year Ridge released her first book The Women Who Shaped Politics, a non-fiction book which discussed women's contribution to British politics. She also started writing columns in the tabloid newspaper Metro.

In 2022, she launched The Take with Sophy Ridge, a 30-minute discussion show based on the interviews that had featured in that week's edition. In 2024, she was involved in the 2024 general election coverage on Sky News.

She continued to present both programmes until July 2023 when it was announced that, from September 2023, she would present a new weeknight political programme for Sky News called Politics Hub. Her last day on Politics Hub was in October 2025. Ridge hosted the primetime show Politics Hub with Sophy Ridge for roughly two years, beginning in September 2023.

Ridge began presenting Sky News Breakfast in November 2025 alongside Wilfred Frost, who has been in the slot since the departure of Kay Burley in February 2025.

== Awards ==
Ridge won the MHP Communications 30 to Watch award in 2012, and was shortlisted as Young Journalist of the Year in the Royal Television Society Awards in 2013. In 2016, she won an award for Broadcast Journalist of the Year at the Words by Women awards.

In March 2025, Ridge won the award for Network Presenter of the Year at the 2025 Royal Television Society Journalism Awards.

== Personal life ==
Ridge has two children. She is a Sheffield Wednesday supporter.
