= European Closing Bell =

- Genre: business news program
- Presented by: Louisa Bojesen (2010-2015); Ross Westgate (2003-2004, 2011-2012); Guy Johnson (2007-2011); Simon Hobbs (2003-2007); Kavita Maharaj (2003-2004)
- Country of origin: United Kingdom

Production
- Running time: 60 minutes

Original release
- Network: CNBC Europe
- Release: 2 June 2003 – 18 December 2015

Related
- European Market Wrap; Squawk Alley

European Closing Bell (prior to June 2003 known as European Market Wrap) is a television programme aired on business news channel CNBC Europe from 5pm to 6pm CET (4pm to 5pm WET), and from 11am to 12pm on CNBC World in the United States. The programme was presented from London by Louisa Bojesen. The show covered the last half-hour of trades in the European equity markets, and reported on the day's final numbers and top stories as the markets close at 5:30pm CET. As the major European markets are electronic, no actual "closing bell" was rung – nonetheless there was a countdown on the CNBC Europe strap and video wall until the close of trade. Other regular segments included a daily "Guest Investor" and a technical analysis slot.

Prior to 26 March 2007, the programme ran for two hours until 7pm CET. The second hour of the programme was of a slower pace, offering a more in-depth look at financial and political events. During major European trade fairs and political events such as EU summits and elections, European Closing Bell was often anchored live from these events. Many of these features were incorporated into the extended Europe Tonight after its relaunch on the same date.

The theme music for the programme is the same as that used by the US version of Closing Bell.

On 9 March 2015, European Closing Bell launched new titles based on the US version used since 13 October 2014.

On 18 December 2015, European Closing Bell ended its 12-year run as it was replaced with the US-produced Squawk Alley, which began airing on CNBC Europe on 21 December 2015.

== See also ==
- Europe Tonight (discontinued at the end of 2009)
- Closing Bell
