= The Early Rundown =

Breakfast television news programme, broadcast weekdays on Sky News

- Genre: Breakfast television programme
- Presented by: Kamali Melbourne (Monday-Thursday)
- Opening theme: Sky News theme
- Countries of origin: United Kingdom (Broadcast internationally)
- Original language: English

Production
- Production location: Studio 21, Sky Central; Osterley, London
- Camera setup: Multi-camera
- Running time: 120 minutes

Original release
- Network: Sky News
- Release: 14 October 2019 – 12 January 2024

The Early Rundown is a British Breakfast programme that is broadcast on Sky News and Sky Showcase every weekday from 5-7 am. The show rounds-up the latest news that has broken overnight, and also offers an insight as to what lies ahead.

Kamali Melbourne was the main presenter before the programme was cancelled, hosting Monday to Friday

== Overview ==
The show from launch was hosted by Niall Paterson from Monday-Thursday with Gamal Fahnbulleh hosting on Fridays. Stephen Dixon later took over hosting the Friday programmes in September 2020.

From December 2020 until March 2021 Stephen Dixon hosted the programme Monday to Thursday as Niall Paterson was covering the main breakfast slot from 7 am–10 am. Friday editions during this time were generally hosted by Kimberley Leonard or Nick Quraishi. From March 2021 to June 2021, Dixon also departed the programme as he began a stint covering the main breakfast slot from 7 am–10 am. There was no set presenter during this period until Niall Paterson and Stephen Dixon both returned to their respective presenting duties on the programme in June 2021.

The show aired for the first time on Monday, 14 October 2019, presented by Paterson with Kirsty McCabe presenting the first weather bulletin.

=== Current presenters ===
Presenter	Role
Kamali Melbourne	Monday-Thursday Presenter
Gillian Joseph	Relief Presenter
Kimberley Leonard	Relief Presenter
Nick Quraishi	Relief Presenter
Vanessa Baffoe	Relief Presenter

Preceded by Sky Midnight News	Sky News weekday schedule 06:00–07:00	Succeeded by Kay Burley
