= The Strategy Session =

Television talk show

The Strategy Session was an investment television talk show on the CNBC television network that was aired for a half-hour, from noon to 12:30 ET, on weekdays. It was hosted by David Faber and Gary Kaminsky.

Debuting June 7, 2010, this program, along with the Fast Money Halftime Report (12:30-1 ET), replaced the first hour of Power Lunch, which itself had its runtime cut in half from two hours to one (1-2 ET).

== Cancellation ==
The Strategy Session was cancelled October 14, 2011 and replaced three days later by the newly expanded Fast Money Halftime Report, which itself doubled its runtime from 30 minutes to 60 minutes and also moved up to the noon ET timeslot.
