= Brian Sullivan (news anchor) =

American journalist

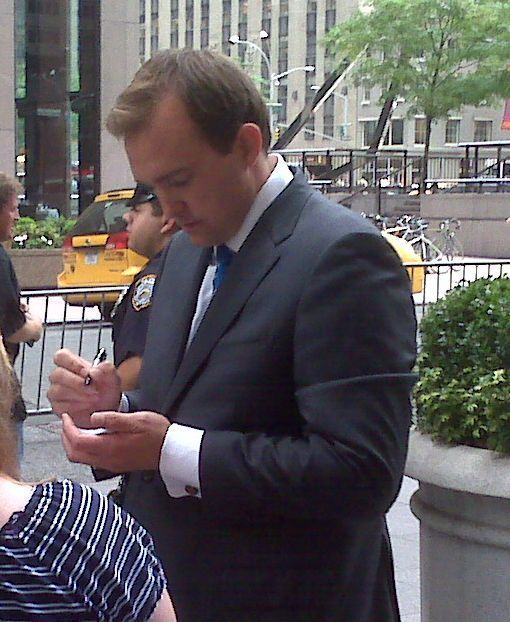
- Sullivan in 2009
- Born: July 19, 1971 (age 55); Los Angeles, California, US
- Education: Virginia Tech (BA); Brooklyn Law School (JD)
- Presenting career
- Show: Power Lunch
- Network: CNBC
- Previous shows: Fox Business; Bloomberg Television

Brian Sullivan (born July 19, 1971, Los Angeles, California) is a television news anchor and business journalist for CNBC, currently co-presenting Power Lunch. Sullivan is also the network's Senior National Correspondent.

== Biography ==
Prior to joining CNBC, Sullivan produced, reported, and anchored at Bloomberg Television (12 years) and Fox Business (3 years).

He joined CNBC in 2011 and has presented a number of the station's flagship programs, including Street Signs (2011-2015), Power Lunch (2015-2018), Worldwide Exchange (2018-2023), and Last Call until it ended in July 2024 and in December 2024 he returned Power Lunch.

Sullivan is recognized as one of the first financial journalists to highlight the risks of the housing bubble. He has been nominated for two prestigious Loeb Awards, one for his 2013 documentary America's Gun: Rise of the AR-15 and the other for the 2007 special "Subprime Shockwaves," which also won the NY CPA Society Excellence in Financial Journalism award.

He is a frequent guest on the MSNBC program Morning Joe and has also appeared on NBC Sports. In 2014 he reported from the Winter Olympics in Sochi, Russia.

Prior to joining Bloomberg in 1997, Sullivan traded chemical commodities for Mitsubishi International. He is a 1993 graduate of Virginia Tech double majoring in Political Science and history, where he played on the rugby team and is a member of Zeta Psi fraternity. He has received a Juris Doctor degree from Brooklyn Law School as well as a Certificate in Journalism from the New York University School of Continuing Education.

Sullivan also races cars competing in the SCCA class Spec Racer Ford. He previously raced in the class Formula Mazda. He won both the 2003 NESCCA Formula Mazda and 2008 NESCCA Spec Racer Ford championships.

Sullivan is a graduate of James Wood High School in Winchester, Virginia.
