= Jacquie Beltrao =

Irish sports presenter and journalist (born 1965)

Jacquie Beltrao (born Jacqueline Leavy on 21 April 1965 in Dublin) is an Irish sports presenter on Sky News and a former Olympic gymnast.

== Early life and career ==
Born in Dublin, Ireland, Beltrao grew up in Coventry, England. She studied sports science at Birmingham University, and represented Great Britain in rhythmic gymnastics at the 1984 Olympic Games in Los Angeles, placing 31st in the All-Around.

She joined Sky News in 1992, where she first worked as a publicist before later becoming a sports reporter and presenter. As of 2025, Beltrao presents the weekend sports updates on Sky News Breakfast.

== Personal life ==
Beltrao is a supporter of Arsenal and of Celtic and the Republic of Ireland national football team. She also has a strong passion for tennis and has done many news reports on the sport for Sky News and Sky Sports News.

She lives with her husband Eduardo Beltrao and three children, Amelia, Tiago, and Jorge in South West London. The family also own a holiday home in Rio de Janeiro, Brazil. The family have three rescue dogs, after she appeared on Sky News representing Dogs Trust.

On 31 December 2013, Beltrao announced she was diagnosed with breast cancer on Christmas Eve.

On 26 June 2020, Beltrao announced on social media her breast cancer had returned and consequently had time away from presenting Sky Sports.
