= Sara Eisen =

American journalist and broadcaster

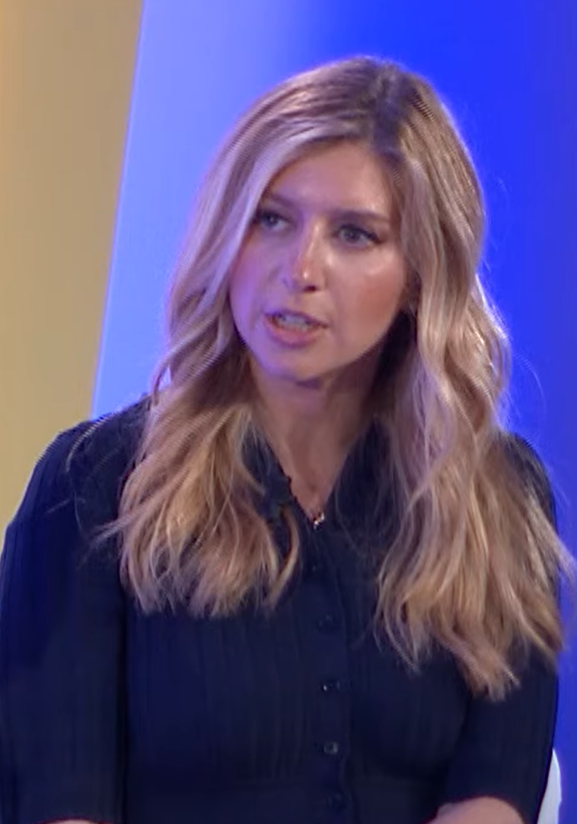
- Born: August 7, 1984 (age 42); Richmond, Virginia, U.S.
- Education: New York University (BA); Northwestern University (MS)
- Occupation: Business journalism
- Title: Co-anchor of Squawk on the Street on CNBC
- Spouse: Matthew Levine (m. 2016)
- Children: 2

Sara Aliza Eisen (born August 7, 1984) is an American financial news anchor for CNBC.

== Early life ==
Sara Eisen attended Seven Hills School in Cincinnati, Ohio, graduating in 2002. She then attended New York University as an undergraduate and completed her graduate studies at Northwestern University.

== Career ==
Eisen worked for Bloomberg Television where she was initially a Bloomberg Radio host and subsequently the television co-anchor of Bloomberg Surveillance. In 2013, she was hired by CNBC to co-host Worldwide Exchange and Squawk on the Street.

On March 12, 2018, Brian Sullivan replaced Eisen (and co-anchor Wilfred Frost) as anchor of Worldwide Exchange. Eisen, in turn, replaced Sullivan on Power Lunch.

On November 29, 2018, Eisen and Frost began co-anchoring Closing Bell. She continued to co-anchor Squawk on the Street until June 22, 2020.

In March 2023, she returned to Squawk on the Street as co-presenter, and from December 2023 she also co-hosted Money Matters, which occupies the third hour of Squawk on the Street.

== Personal life ==
Eisen is married to Matthew Levine, the former head of US programming at Bloomberg Television. Together, they have two children.

Her grandfather is a Holocaust survivor.

Eisen serves on Room to Read's North American regional board.
