= Power Lunch =

CNBC Program

- Logo from 2014-2023
- Presented by: Bill Griffeth (1996—Dec. 11, 2009); Sue Herera (Dec. 8, 2003—Feb. 6, 2015); Tyler Mathisen (Dec. 14, 2009—Dec. 20, 2024); Michelle Caruso-Cabrera (2002—2003, 2009—2013; Jan. 19, 2016–August 22, 2018); Dennis Kneale (2009—Jun. 8, 2010); Amanda Drury (Feb. 9, 2015—Jan. 15, 2016); Brian Sullivan (Feb. 9, 2015—Mar. 9, 2018; Dec. 23, 2024-present); Melissa Lee (Feb. 9, 2015—2024); Sara Eisen (Mar. 12, 2018—November 30, 2018); Kelly Evans (December 3, 2018—present)
- Country of origin: United States

Production
- Running time: 60 minutes as of January 7, 2019

Original release
- Network: CNBC
- Release: March 4, 1996 – present

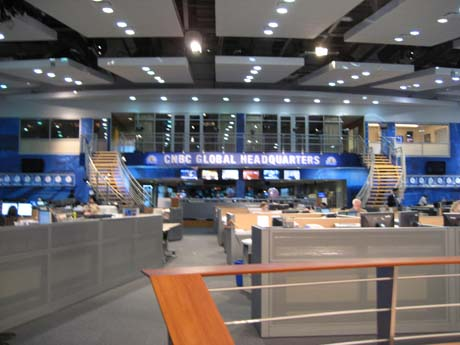
The Power Lunch broadcast set

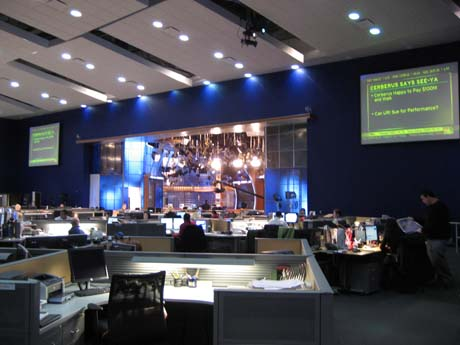
The Power Lunch background

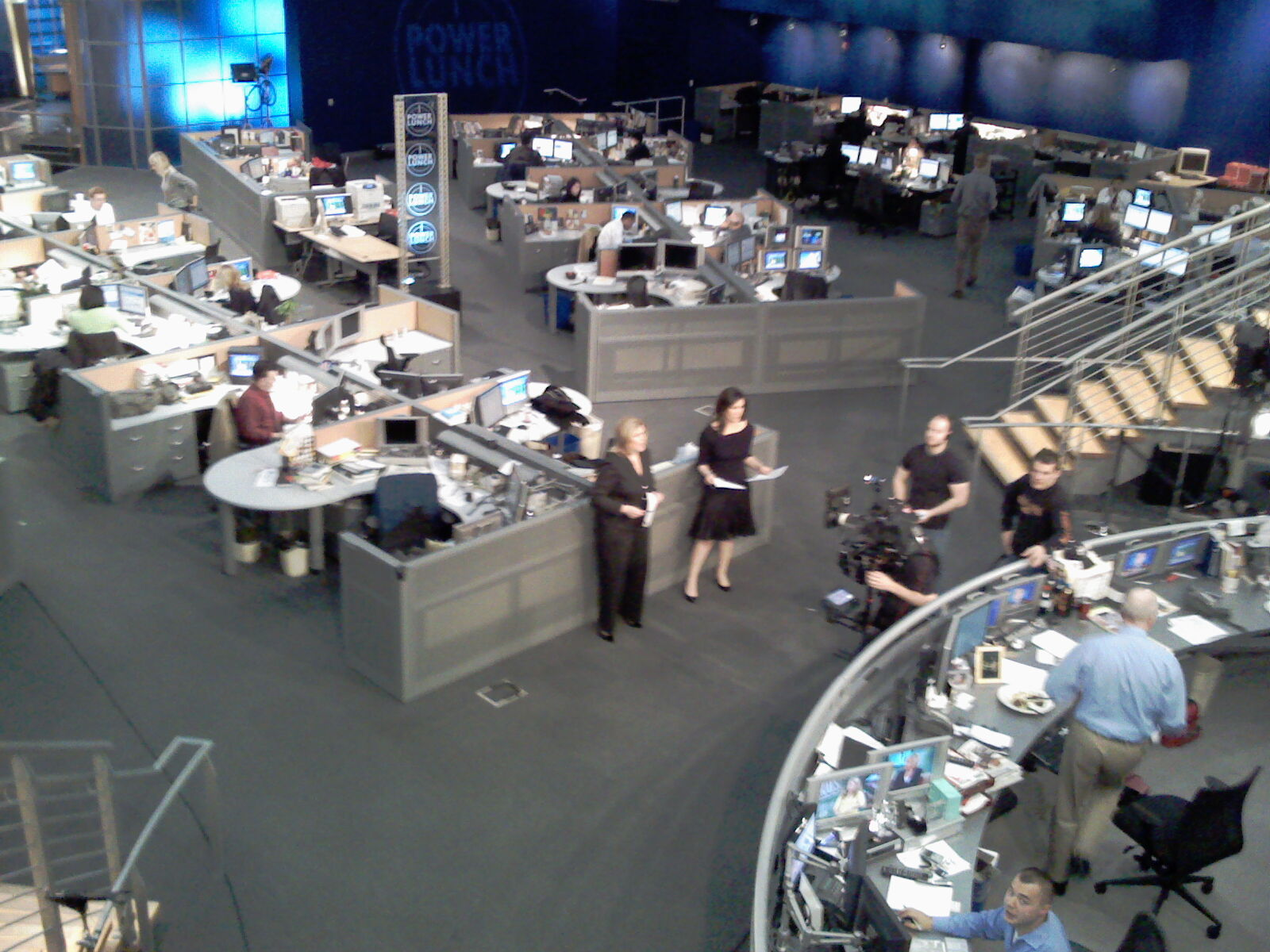
A Power Lunch broadcast (2008-03-11)

Power Lunch is a television business news program on CNBC, airing between 2 p.m. and 3 p.m. Eastern Time. It is presented by Brian Sullivan and Kelly Evans.

== History ==
Bill Griffeth anchored the program alone from 1996 to 2002. Caruso-Cabrera joined as Griffeth's original co-presenter from February 4, 2002 to December 5, 2003, before being replaced by Sue Herera, who debuted three days later. Caruso-Cabrera and Dennis Kneale appeared regularly in their respective analyst capacities until both became full co-presenters in 2009. Mathisen joined the program on December 14, 2009, after Griffeth's leave of absence began.

Power Lunch originally aired for two hours (noon to 2 ET) until June 7, 2010, when it moved to 1 ET, with its run-time cut to 1 hour, making room for The Strategy Session at noon ET and the Fast Money Halftime Report at 12:30 ET. The show became a 2-hour program once again on February 9, 2015, with run-time then from 1-3 p.m. ET, replacing Street Signs (which aired its final edition three days prior). Sullivan and Amanda Drury, both of whom previously co-anchored Street Signs, joined the program the same day, along with current Fast Money and Options Action host Melissa Lee. They replaced Herera, who left three days earlier. Caruso-Cabrera rejoined the program for her third stint as co-presenter on January 19, 2016 after Amanda Drury's departure from CNBC U.S. (in the case of the latter, she rejoined CNBC Asia as a Sydney-based correspondent that July). On March 12, 2018, Sara Eisen (previously co-anchor of Worldwide Exchange and later co-anchor of Squawk on the Street, now co-anchor of Closing Bell) and Brian Sullivan swapped their respective anchor roles, with Eisen moving to Power Lunch and Sullivan moving to Worldwide Exchange. On November 30, 2018, Eisen and Kelly Evans swapped their respective anchor roles, with the former moving to Closing Bell and Evans moving to Power Lunch. On January 7, 2019 Power Lunch was halved in length due to the launch of a new program, The Exchange, presented by Kelly Evans. Consequently, Power Lunch is once again a 60-minute program, running between 2 pm and 3 pm ET. On December 23, 2024, Sullivan returned to Power Lunch as co-anchor to replace the departed Tyler Mathisen, who semi-retired from CNBC on December 20, 2024.

On October 13, 2014, Power Lunch was launched in full 1080i high-definition as part of CNBC's network-wide switch to a full 16:9 letterbox format.

== Overview ==
This program examines the businesses, people, and trends that influence Wall Street, in addition to real-time market coverage at roughly the midway point of the U.S. trading day.

== Present segments ==
- CNBC 101: Bob Pisani presents the "CNBC 101" segment on Thursdays.
- News Update: News headlines from outside the world of business, broadcast at 2.30pm ET.
- Econo Smackdown: Seen during the first hour with Steve Liesman (in studio) and Rick Santelli (in Chicago).
- Trader Triple Play: Seen on Fridays during the second hour as three Wall Street traders join the program (either via satellite or in-studio) to talk about the three key economic diaries in which investors and viewers need to know for the coming week.
- Markets Minute By Minute: A guest (or two guests) join the program to tell viewers and the show's anchors what is moving the markets.
- Around the Watercooler: This is a segment in which the anchors talk about the day's biggest topics (inside and outside the business world) from behind their respective desks.

== Past segments ==
- Dow Jones Halftime Report: Presented by Bob O'Brien and Ray Hennessey (both Dow Jones Newswires employees at the time), highlighting winning or losing sectors of the trading day.
- Making Money Now: Seen during the second hour of the program from April to August 2005, ending with the "Lightning Round" (which was unrelated to the most popular segment on Mad Money) in which the stock pickers had 15 seconds to decide if the stock given by the anchors are a buy, sell, or a hold. This segment was discontinued as of September 2005.
- Power Poll: Moved to the Closing Bell in April 2005, and was renamed the Closing Bell Poll. This segment was discontinued on Closing Bell at the end of 2005.
- Power Topic
- Power Lesson
- Stock Specials: This segment, which was discontinued as of September 2005, featured Joe Kernen highlighting the day's stocks.
- By Request
- Fast Money Halftime Report: This segment, which featured Melissa Lee and her Fast Money panel highlighting a winning or losing sector of the day, spun off as a separate TV show of its own on June 7, 2010, when it debuted.
- Your Digital Life This segment, which featured David Pogue in a humorous skit, ran from 2007 to 2011, and featured the latest in technology.

== Current anchors ==
- Brian Sullivan (February 9, 2015 - March 9, 2018; December 23, 2024 – present)
- Kelly Evans (December 3, 2018 – present)

== Former anchors ==
- Bill Griffeth (1996-November 25, 2009) (previously with Closing Bell, later moved to Nightly Business Report, the latter of which ended on December 27, 2019)
- Sue Herera (December 8, 2003 – February 6, 2015) (previously with Nightly Business Report, now CNBC news update anchor)
- Dennis Kneale (2009-June 8, 2010)
- Amanda Drury (February 9, 2015 – January 15, 2016) (rejoined CNBC Asia as Sydney-based correspondent in July 2016)
- Michelle Caruso-Cabrera (2002-2003; 2009-2013; January 19, 2016 – August 22, 2018)
- Sara Eisen (April 4, 2018 – November 30, 2018) (previously with Closing Bell, now back with Squawk on the Street)
- Melissa Lee (February 9, 2015 - 2024)
- Tyler Mathisen (December 14, 2009 - December 20, 2024)

== Special editions ==
=== Power Brunch ===
In the week of October 4, 1999, Power Lunch became Power Brunch, because they broadcast the show live from Silicon Valley that week.

=== Big Road Show ===
In May 2005, Power Lunch went on the road for its week-long Big Road Show. Bill Griffeth hosted these week-long special editions from Miami, Phoenix, Dallas, and Los Angeles (Sue Herera was on maternity leave when these editions aired).

=== Making Money Across America ===
On September 7, 2007, Power Lunch began airing an eight-week series titled, "Making Money Across America", which concluded on October 26, 2007. These special road shows were aired on Fridays as this program visited eight U.S. cities over as many weeks. The dates and cities were:

- September 7: Chicago (Bill Griffeth and Sue Herera co-hosted from the Navy Pier)
- September 14: San Francisco (Griffeth hosted from the Hyde Street Pier, San Francisco Maritime National Historical Park, on Fisherman's Wharf)
- September 21: Denver (Herera hosted from the Anschutz Family Sky Terrace of the Denver Museum of Nature and Science)
- September 28: St. Louis (Griffeth was at Kiener Plaza in the city's central business district)
- October 5: Charlotte (Herera co-hosted from Wachovia Plaza)
- October 12: Seattle (Griffeth was on the observation deck of the Space Needle)
- October 19: Philadelphia (Griffeth was in the network's Englewood Cliffs, New Jersey studio, while Herera was live from Independence National Historical Park in Philadelphia)
- October 26: Minneapolis (Griffeth was at the Mall of America)

== Worldwide Power Lunch ==
Around CNBC's global branches, there are many counterparts of Power Lunch in the world:

Channel	Program	Still Run?	Presenter	Replacement
CNBC Asia	Power Lunch Asia	(1999-11-01—2003-03-28)	Rico Hizon	US Business Center
Nikkei CNBC	Power Lunch Tokyo			
CNBC Europe	Power Lunch Europe	(1999-11-08—2009-01-12)	Louisa Bojesen	N/A
CNBC-TV18	Business Lunch	(1999—present)	Mitali Mukherjee	N/A
CNBC Pakistan	Power Lunch	(2005—2008)		N/A
CNBC-e	Finans Cafe	(2000—present)		N/A
Class-CNBC	Linea Mercati Giorno	(?—present)		N/A
CNBC Africa	Power Lunch Africa	(2007-06-01—present)	Alec Hogg	N/A
CNBC Arabiya	Borsat Al Alam	(?—present)		N/A
SBS-CNBC	Power Lunch Korea	(2010–present)		
CNBC Indonesia	Power Lunch Indonesia	(2018—present)	N/A	-

== See also ==
- Power Lunch Europe
