= Jon Fortt =

American journalist

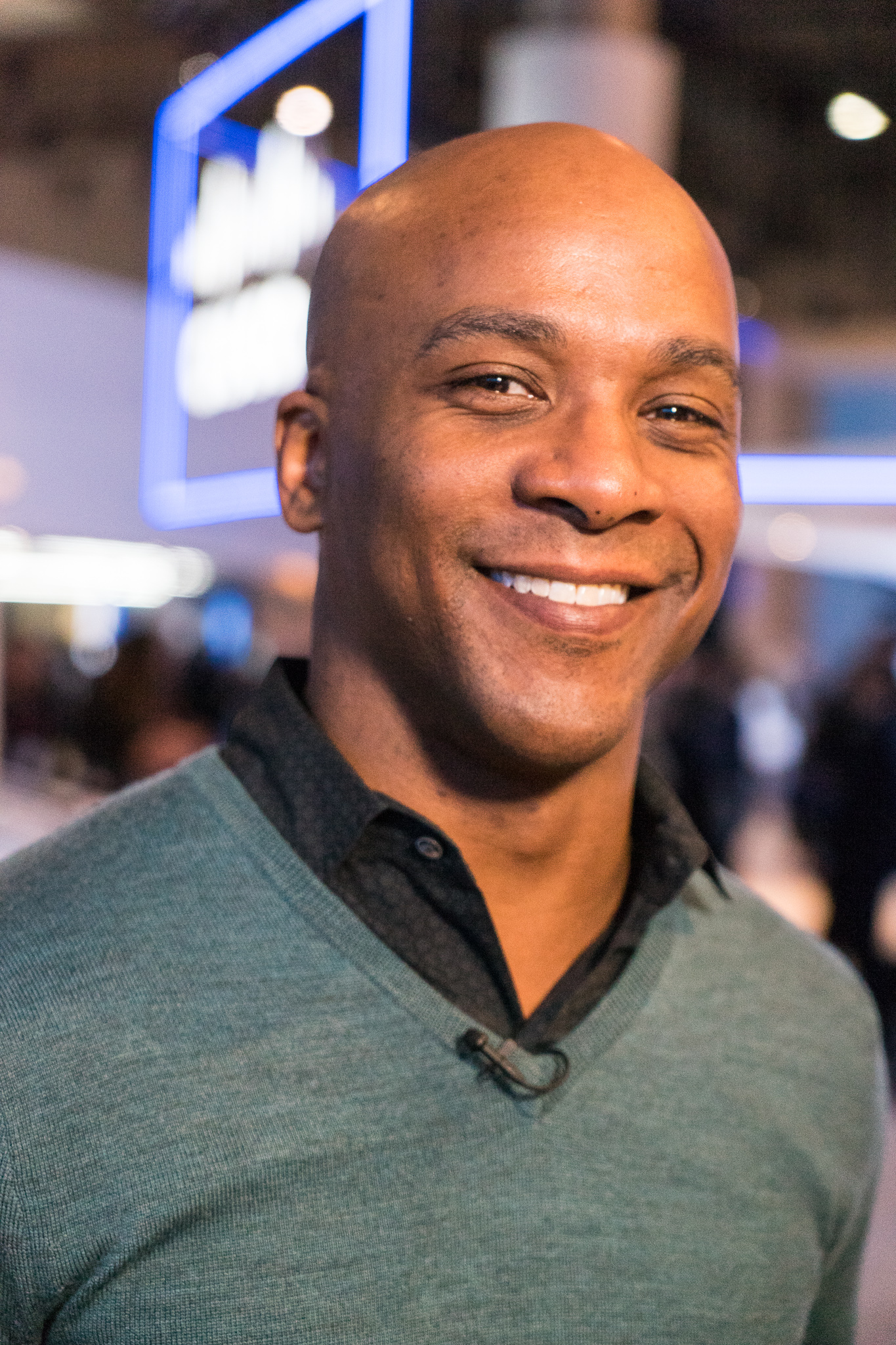
- Fortt in 2017
- Born: December 12, 1976 (age 49); Long Island, New York, U.S.
- Education: DePauw University (BA)
- Occupation: Journalist
- Employer: CNBC

Jon Fortt (born December 12, 1976) is an American journalist and the co-anchor of CNBC's Closing Bell Overtime broadcast. He previously co-anchored TechCheck. He is the creator and host of Fortt Knox, a technology, leadership and innovation brand that has existed as a podcast and streaming program since 2016 and now has its primary home on Linkedin.

On Fortt Knox he has interviewed entrepreneurs, CEOs and celebrities including Michael Dell, Adena Friedman, Reid Hoffman, Daymond John, Satya Nadella, Katrina Lake, Michael Phelps, Q-Tip and Andy Jassy. In September 2021, he crafted a weekly segment on CNBC's Power Lunch program called "Working Lunch," which excerpts Fortt Knox interviews to introduce viewers to the personalities and strategies of founders and CEOs. In August 2020, he crafted a weekly segment on CNBC's Squawk Box program called "On the Other Hand," in which he argues two sides of one business or technology issue. Earlier in 2020, he created The Black Experience in America: The Course, at forttmedia.com. In November 2024, he was included on The Root 100, the online publication's list of the 100 most influential Black Americans.

== Early life and education ==
Fortt was born on Long Island, New York. His family later moved to Washington, D.C., where he attended Montgomery Blair High School and was president of the Student Government Association in the 1993–94 school year and organized protests to push Montgomery County to build a new school in its current location, then known as the Kay tract. In his senior year, he won the Knight-Ridder Minority Journalism Scholarship. He attended DePauw University, where he was part of the Media Fellows honors program. There he worked at The DePauw student newspaper and became editor. He graduated with a Bachelor of Arts in English Writing. On May 22, 2022, he delivered the commencement address at DePauw, a message called "Love, Truth and Impact." He joined DePauw's board of trustees in October 2022.

== Career ==
Fortt began his post-college career at the Lexington Herald-Leader in Lexington, Kentucky, where he was assigned the technology beat in 1999 after another reporter suddenly quit. Later that year he moved to California to join the San Jose Mercury News in San Jose, California. In 2006 he went to Business 2.0 magazine as a senior editor in charge of the "What Works" section.

In 2007, he joined Fortune magazine as a senior writer covering large companies including Apple Inc., Hewlett-Packard, and Microsoft. Fortt began working for CNBC in 2010 as a Silicon Valley–based technology correspondent.

In 2013, he relocated to CNBC headquarters. He joined the board of the National Summer Learning Association, a non-profit, in 2021.
