= Bertha Coombs =

American television reporter

Bertha Coombs (born December 28, 1961) is a reporter for CNBC, based at the Nasdaq MarketSite in Times Square. She covers business and financial news stories.

Coombs attended The Park School in Brookline, Massachusetts, Milton Academy in Milton, Massachusetts, and Yale University in New Haven, Connecticut.

Prior to joining CNBC, she worked at ABC News as a reporter and news anchor, covering such stories as the Clinton impeachment, the Kosovo War, Hurricane Floyd, Rudy Giuliani's troubled marriage, and the John F. Kennedy, Jr. plane crash.

She was Milton Academy's graduation speaker in 2005. Coombs has served on the board of the National Association of Hispanic Journalists.

== See also ==
- New Yorkers in journalism
