= Erin Burnett =

American news anchor (born 1976)

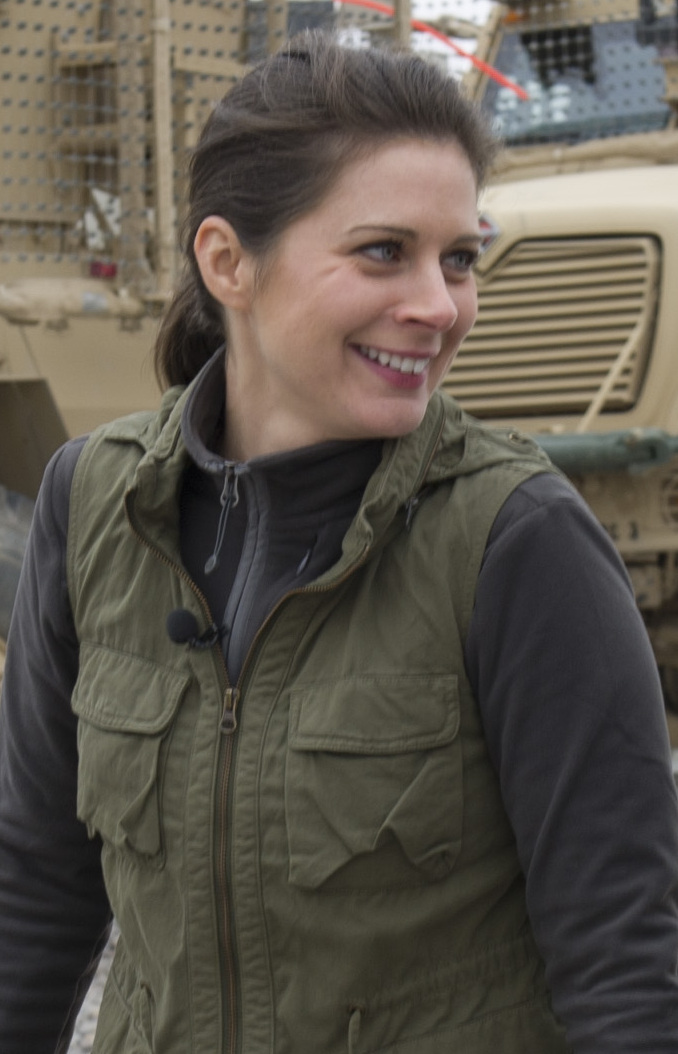
- Burnett in 2012
- Born: Erin Isabelle Burnett; July 2, 1976 (age 50); Mardela Springs, Maryland, U.S.
- Education: Williams College (BA)
- Occupations: News anchor, journalist
- Years active: 2003–present
- Spouse: David Rubulotta (m. 2012)
- Children: 3

Erin Isabelle Burnett (born July 2, 1976) is an American news anchor, currently the anchor of Erin Burnett OutFront on CNN. She previously worked for CNBC as co-anchor of Squawk on the Street and the host of Street Signs. Burnett has also appeared on NBC's Meet the Press, Today, MSNBC's Morning Joe, and NBC Nightly News as well as making occasional appearances on The Celebrity Apprentice.

Burnett has hosted Erin Burnett OutFront live from the borders of Mali, Afghanistan, Rwanda, the United Arab Emirates, and Israel. She has also reported from China, Ukraine, and Pakistan for the program.

While working at NBC, Joe Scarborough dubbed Burnett "the International Superstar" for her work on a number of documentaries filmed outside the United States. Her reports and documentaries were filmed inside Ethiopia, Libya, the Democratic Republic of the Congo, Nigeria, Russia, the United Arab Emirates, Jordan, and India.

In her career, she has focused extensively on reporting in the Middle East and has filed reports from Egypt, Iran, Iraq, Israel, Lebanon, Palestine, Saudi Arabia, Tunisia, Turkey, and Yemen, in addition to Pakistan.

== Early life ==
Burnett was born and raised in Mardela Springs, Maryland. She is the youngest daughter of Esther Margaret (née Stewart) and Kenneth King Burnett, a corporate attorney. She is of Irish, Scottish, and English ancestry. Burnett attended the Salisbury School, a private, independent elementary and middle school in Salisbury, MD prior to attending St. Andrew's School, a private co-educational college preparatory boarding school in Middletown, Delaware, graduating in 1994. She returned to the school in 2009 to deliver the commencement speech. She attended Williams College in Williamstown, Massachusetts, where she studied political science and economics, graduating with a Bachelor of Arts degree in political economy. She played lacrosse and field hockey.

== Career ==
Burnett began her career as a financial analyst for Goldman Sachs in their investment banking division, where she worked on mergers and acquisitions and corporate finance. While working as an investment-banking analyst, Burnett was offered a position at CNN as a writer and booker for CNN's Moneyline with Stuart Varney, Willow Bay, and Lou Dobbs. She left the position to serve as vice president of Citigroup's digital media group, CitiMedia.

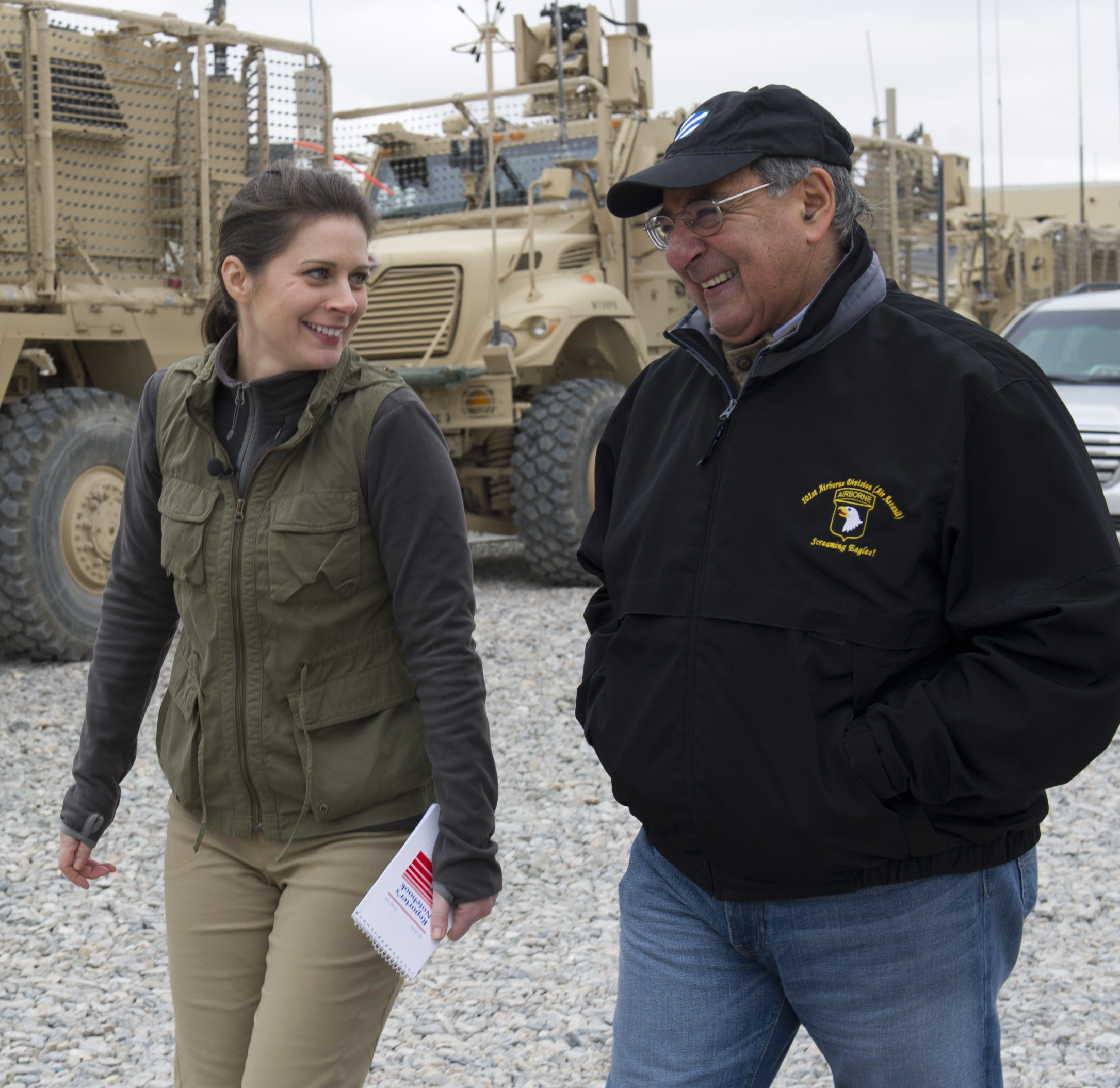
Burnett in December 2012, interviewing U.S. Secretary of Defense Leon Panetta in Afghanistan

Following Citigroup, Burnett joined Bloomberg Television as Stocks Editor and anchor. From 2005 to 2011, Burnett was the host of CNBC's Street Signs and co-anchor of Squawk on the Street with Mark Haines.

On August 5, 2009, Burnett used the term "serial killer" in a discussion with her host Jim Cramer regarding a report about the Australian Prime Minister Kevin Rudd's plans to spend millions of dollars on aerial shooting to cull Australian feral camels in the outback. Cramer referred to the reported plan as "camelcide". The next day on the show, Burnett said her comment was meant as a joke.

On December 7, 2010, Burnett presented an investigative report on chemical giant Transammonia doing business in Iran. She reported that a wholly owned subsidiary of Transammonia in the United States purchased ammonia from Iran. On December 13, 2010, as a result of the CNBC report, Transammonia sent a press release to congressional leaders stating that Transammonia's Swiss subsidiary would not enter into new contracts with Iranian companies and would wind down its business with Iran "as soon as possible." The following year, the investigative report was nominated for an Emmy.

Following more than five years with CNBC, Burnett left the network on May 6, 2011, and joined rival news outlet CNN beginning October 3, 2011. There she began headlining her own prime-time news program, called Erin Burnett OutFront, which films at CNN's New York City studios.

Shortly after joining CNN, Burnett aired an October 4, 2011 segment on the Occupy Wall Street protests titled "Seriously?" She was accused by journalism watchdog group Fairness & Accuracy in Reporting (FAIR) of misrepresenting facts about protesters. Journalist Glenn Greenwald reacted in a Salon article detailing bias in Burnett's reporting, which he attributed to her previous work experience on Wall Street as well as her partner's employment with Citigroup. In response to the criticism, CNN issued a statement saying, "We support Erin and the OutFront team and we respect that there will be a range of opinions on any given story."

On June 1, 2020, Burnett stated that President Trump's proposal under the Insurrection Act to use military forces to remove protestors from Lafayette Square would constitute "invoking an act not invoked since 1807 to deploy U.S. military troops on American soil." She later issued a correction, noting that the act has been invoked much more recently, the last time in 1992.

=== Hosted programs ===
- Bloomberg on the Markets (2003–05)
- Street Signs (2006–11)
- Squawk on the Street (2005–11)
- Erin Burnett OutFront (2011–present)

=== Documentaries ===
- City of Money & Mystery (2008)
- India Rising: The New Empire (2008)
- The Russian Gamble (2008)
- Dollars & Danger: Africa, The Final Investment Frontier (2009)
- On Assignment: Iraq (2010)
- Big Money in the Middle East (2010)

=== Film ===
- Edge of Tomorrow as CNN news anchor (herself)

== Personal life ==
Burnett met executive David Rubulotta on a blind date in 2003. Rubulotta was previously a trader for Lehman Brothers. They became engaged in September 2011. Burnett and Rubulotta were married on December 21, 2012.

On November 29, 2013, Burnett gave birth to a son. On July 18, 2015, she gave birth to a daughter. The couple welcomed their third child, a boy, on August 20, 2018.

Burnett is Roman Catholic.

== See also ==
- New Yorkers in journalism
