= Carl Quintanilla =

American journalist (born 1970)

- Born: Carl Quintanilla; September 10, 1970 (age 55); Midland, Michigan, U.S.
- Education: University of Colorado Boulder
- Occupation: Journalist

Carl Quintanilla (born September 10, 1970) is an American journalist and co-anchor of Squawk on the Street on CNBC.

== Early life and education ==
Quintanilla was born in Midland, Michigan. He wanted to be a disc jockey when he was younger.

As a high school student, he interned at Westword Magazine in Denver.

Quintanilla attended the University of Colorado Boulder, where in 1993 he received a Bachelor of Arts degree in political science. From 1991 to 1993, he was a reporter and columnist for the Daily Camera in Boulder. He spent a summer as an editorial assistant for NPR in Washington D.C.

== Career ==
From 1994 to 1999, Quintanilla served as a staff reporter for The Wall Street Journal where he wrote full-time for the newspaper's Chicago bureau, covering airlines, manufacturing and economic issues. He also wrote a weekly column on workplace issues and on-the-job trends for the newspaper's front page.

From 1999 to 2002, he served as correspondent for several CNBC programs including Business Center as well as a special correspondent for Fox X-press on Fox News. Prior to joining NBC, Quintanilla served as co-anchor for CNBC's early-morning program, Wake Up Call.

Beginning December 19, 2005, Quintanilla co-anchored Squawk Box.

In 2007, he traveled to China to cover McDonald's efforts in the country for CNBC's documentary Big Mac: Inside the McDonald's Empire.

He, along with others at CNBC were berated by Jon Stewart in the aftermath of the 2008 financial crisis for failing to predict the downturn and ask tough questions of Wall Street executives. On his show, Quintanilla had once asked Allen Stanford, later known as the orchestrator of a "massive Ponzi scheme", how it felt to be a billionaire.

From 2003 until 2015 he was primary substitute-anchor on Weekend Today when Lester Holt was on assignment or had a weekend off and from 2010 until September 2015, Quintanilla substitute-anchored weekday and weekend editions of NBC Nightly News, covering when hosts Brian Williams and Lester Holt were on assignment or away. He also substitute co-hosted Today.

In July 2011, Quintanilla left Squawk Box to join Squawk on the Street.

In June 2014, Quintanilla joined HBO Real Sports as a correspondent. He presented a story on Stephon Marbury in January 2015.

On October 28, 2015, Quintanilla was one of CNBC's moderators of the third of the 2016 Republican Party presidential debates and forums at the University of Colorado Boulder. He and his CNBC co-moderators were heavily criticized for being ill-prepared and rude to the candidates.

=== Awards ===
Quintanilla won an Emmy Award, an Edward R. Murrow Award and a Peabody Award for his coverage of Hurricane Katrina in 2005.

== Personal life ==
Quintanilla is married to Judy Chung, a former TV producer who now works as a product manager for Ralph Lauren. Quintanilla and his family live in Bridgehampton, New York.

== See also ==
- List of CNBC personalities
- List of television reporters
- List of University of Colorado at Boulder people
- New Yorkers in journalism

Media offices
Preceded by Lester Holt	Weekend Today Sunday Co-Anchor; 2015–present	Succeeded by Incumbent
Preceded by Lester Holt	NBC Nightly News Sunday Edition Anchor; 2015–present	Succeeded by Incumbent
