= Wilfred Frost =

Financial news anchor (born 1985)

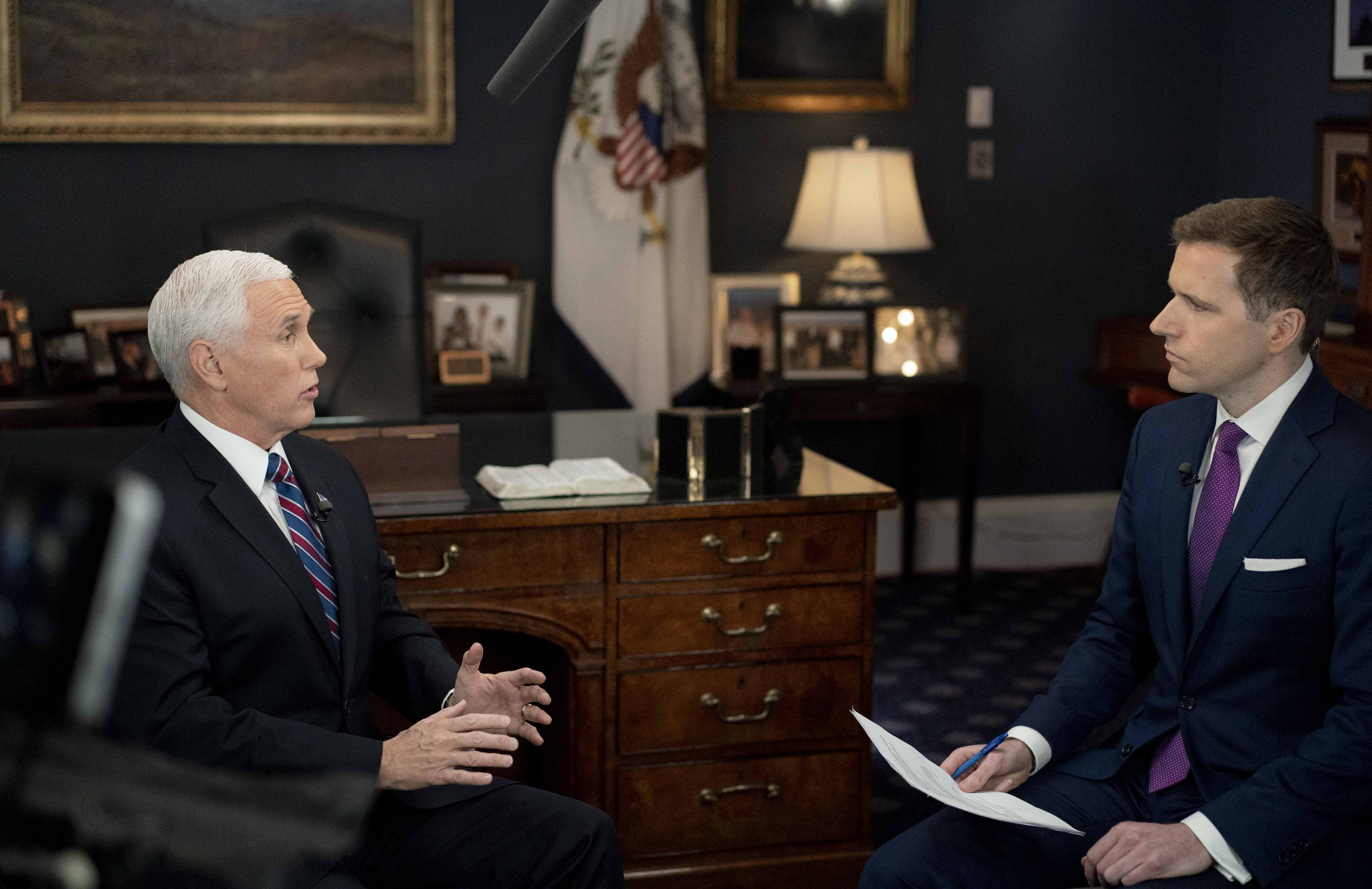
- Frost (right) interviewing Vice President Mike Pence in February 2020
- Born: 7 August 1985 (age 41); United Kingdom
- Education: University of Oxford
- Occupation: Business journalism
- Title: Contributor for Sky News, NBC and CNBC
- Father: David Frost

Wilfred Frost (born 7 August 1985) is a presenter for Sky News, fronting Mornings With Ridge & Frost, and a contributor for CNBC, NBC News and MSNBC.

== Early life and education ==
Frost is the son of Sir David Frost and Lady Carina Fitzalan-Howard, a daughter of the 17th Duke of Norfolk. Frost attended Eton College and the University of Oxford, where he graduated with a degree in Politics, Philosophy, and Economics.

== Career ==
After graduating, Frost worked for Newton Investment Management in London for 5 years. In 2011, after attending a weekend-long media-training programme in London, he left his job to pursue a career in broadcasting.

In 2014, Frost joined CNBC as the co-presenter of Worldwide Exchange, first from London and beginning in 2016, from the United States.

In 2018, Frost became co-anchor of Closing Bell. On 3 February 2022 Frost announced his departure from Closing Bell to begin working with Sky News in London in March 2022. Frost remains with NBC/CNBC as a contributor.

Frost presents Mornings with Ridge and Frost with Sophy Ridge, on Sky News live from London, as well as the Cheat Sheet podcast.

Alongside this he hosts The Master Investor Podcast.

== Personal life ==
Frost's parents owned Michelmersh Court, a 21-acre estate in the south of England. There, he met Margaret Thatcher, John Major, Tony Blair, and George H. W. Bush.

In 2015, Frost's older brother, Miles, died from hypertrophic cardiomyopathy. His father had the same condition when he died as discovered in the autopsy in 2013. In response, he and his younger brother, George, created the Miles Frost Fund, which works to raise awareness of and increase testing for this hereditary heart condition. Wilfred underwent hypertrophic cardiomyopathy screening and tested negative.

He is the godson of John Cleese.
