= Bob Pisani =

American television personality

Robert V. Pisani
- Born: 1956 (age 69–70)
- Occupation: Contributor
- Website: https://www.cnbc.com/bob-pisani/

Robert V. Pisani (born 1956) is a contributor and former correspondent for CNBC.

== Career ==
Pisani has worked for CNBC since 1990. Until 1997, Pisani largely covered the real estate industry and corporate management. Since then, he has reported live from the floor of the New York Stock Exchange. He mainly focuses on activity in major stock market indices and was CNBC's senior markets correspondent. On May 6, 2025, Pisani announced he was stepping down from his role with his last day as senior markets correspondent on May 9, 2025, but is remaining with the network as a contributor to CNBC planning to return later in 2025 marking a transition rather than a complete departure from the network.

=== Awards ===
Pisani was twice nominated for a CableACE Award, in 1993 and 1995. In 2017, Pisani was honored with a Lifetime Achievement Award from the Security Traders Association of New York. In 2013, he won Third Place in the National Headliner Awards in the Business and Consumer Reporting category for his documentary on the diamond business, "The Diamond Rush." In 2014, Pisani was honored with a Recognition Award from the Market Technicians Association for "steadfast efforts to integrate technical analysis into financial decision making, journalism and reporting."

== Personal life ==
Pisani is the son of Ralph Pisani, a real estate developer. He is of Italian heritage.

He and his father taught a course on real estate development at the Wharton School of the University of Pennsylvania from 1987 to 1992.

Pisani is a graduate of the California Institute of Technology.

He co-wrote a book with his father called How to be a Successful Developer.

Pisani enjoys jazz. For over 30 years, he has collected original rock concert posters.

== Criticism by Jim Cramer ==
In December 2006, Mad Money host Jim Cramer used Pisani as an example of an easily manipulated reporter used by hedge fund managers to spread false statements about a company in order to illegally drive the stock price down. Cramer said, "It’s really important to get the Pisanis of the world and people talking about it as if there is something wrong...". Cramer later apologized to Pisani.

== See also ==
- New Yorkers in journalism

== Bibliography ==
- Pisani, Robert; Pisani, Ralph (2001). How to Be a Successful Developer. eReads.com. ISBN 978-0-7592-0367-9.
- Pisani, Bob (2022). Shut Up and Keep Talking: Lessons on Life and Investing from the Floor of the New York Stock Exchange. Harriman House. ISBN 978-0-8571-9921-8.
