= Asian Television Awards =

Annual television awards from Singapore

- Awarded for: programming and production excellence in the Asian television industry
- Country: Singapore
- First award: 1995; 31 years ago
- Website: Asian Television Awards

The Asian Television Awards, founded in 1996, are awards recognizing programming and production excellence in the Asian television industry. Held every December, it comprises 56 categories across news, documentaries and current affairs, kids and animation, entertainment, drama, technical, digital, as well as performances including acting and directing. The Awards draw about 1,400 entries each year from a wide range of broadcasters, including free-to-air TV stations, pay-TV platforms, OTT platforms, as well as many independent production houses in Asia. Every year, a panel of more than 50 judges from more than 10 countries evaluate and select the entries. The winners are then awarded across 3 evenings: a Gala Dinner in Kuching for the technical and creative categories followed by a live telecast the next day for the entertainment and acting categories, also in Kuching. The digital awards are presented separately in another country.

== Award Categories ==
Award categories change between editions. The 2025 edition introduced the Best Micro Drama Series, and the 2026 edition introduces the Best AI Application category. Below are reference categories that have appeared in the history of the Asian Television Awards.

=== Short Video and Social Categories ===
- Best Short Form Video Series - Scripted
- Best Short Form Video Series - Unscripted
- Best Short Form Video Series - Factual
- Best Short Form Video Series - Entertainment
- Best Branded Content
- Best Music Video
- Best Music Livestream
- Best Influencer - Health, Beauty & Fitness
- Best Influencer - Travel & Lifestyle
- Best Influencer - Sports and Gaming

=== Digital Categories ===
- Best Single Digital Programme/Short Film
- Best Digital Non-Fiction Programme/Series
- Best Digital Fiction Programme/Series
- Best Original Digital Drama Series
- Best Original Digital Entertainment Programme
- Best Leading Male Performance - Digital
- Best Leading Female Performance - Digital
- Best Host/Presenter - Digital

=== Technical and Creative Categories ===
- Best Cinematography
- Best Direction (Non-Fiction)
- Best Direction (Fiction)
- Best Editing
- Best Original Screenplay
- Best Theme Song
- Best Scriptwriting

=== Performance Categories ===
- Best News Presenter or Anchor
- Best Current Affairs Presenter
- Best Entertainment Presenter/Host
- Best Sports Presenter/Commentator
- Best Actor in a Leading Role
- Best Actress in a Leading Role
- Best Actor in a Supporting Role
- Best Actress in a Supporting Role

=== Best Programming Categories ===
- Best Documentary Programme (one-off/special)
- Best Documentary Series
- Best Natural History or Wildlife Programme
- Best News Programme
- Best Single News Story/Report (10min or less)
- Best Current Affairs Programme
- Best Drama Series
- Best Single Drama or Telemovie
- Best Comedy Programme
- Best Children's Programme
- Best Preschool Programme
- Best Entertainment (one-off/annual)
- Best General Entertainment Programme
- Best Game or Quiz Programme
- Best Music Programme
- Best Reality Show
- Best Infotainment Programme
- Best Talk Show
- Best Social Awareness Programme
- Best Adaptation of an Existing Format
- Best Lifestyle Programme
- Best 2D Animated Programme
- Best 3D Animated Programme
- Best Live Sports Coverage
- Best Sports Programme

=== Best AI Application ===
- Best AI Application - Audio
- Best AI Application - Environment or Character
- Best AI Application - Synthetic Cinematography

== Grand Awards ==
| YEAR | Terrestrial Broadcaster of the Year | Cable & Satellite Network of the Year | Terrestrial Channel of the Year | Cable & Satellite Channel of the Year |
|---|---|---|---|---|
| 2006 | – | – | (South Korea) Seoul Broadcasting System | (Hong Kong) CNN International |
| 2007 | (Singapore) Mediacorp | (Singapore) Discovery Networks Asia-Pacific | – | – |
| 2008 | (Singapore) Mediacorp | (Singapore) Discovery Networks Asia-Pacific | – | – |
| 2009 | – | – | (Japan) Tokyo Broadcasting System Television | (Singapore) Discovery Channel |
| 2010 | (Singapore) Mediacorp | (Singapore) Discovery Networks Asia-Pacific | (Singapore) Mediacorp 5 | (Singapore) Discovery Channel |
| 2011 | (Singapore) Mediacorp | (Hong Kong) CNN International | (Japan) NHK General TV | (Hong Kong) CNN International |
| 2012 | (South Korea) Korean Broadcasting System | (China) Shanghai Media Group | (South Korea) KBS2 | (China) International Channel Shanghai |
| 2013 | (Singapore) Mediacorp | (Singapore) Fox International Channels Asia | (South Korea) KBS1 | (Hong Kong) CNN International |
| 2014 | (Singapore) Mediacorp | (Hong Kong) CNN International | (Singapore) Mediacorp 5 | (Hong Kong) CNN International |
| 2015 | (Singapore) Mediacorp | (Singapore) Discovery Networks Asia-Pacific | (Singapore) CNA | (Singapore) Discovery Channel |
| 2021 | (Taiwan) Hakka TV | (Indonesia) Emtek Group | - | - |

== Performance Categories ==
| YEAR | Best Actor in a Leading Role | Best Actress in a Leading Role | Best Actor in a Supporting Role | Best Actress in a Supporting Role | Best Comedy Performance by an Actor/Actress |
|---|---|---|---|---|---|
| 1996 | (Philippines) Roderick Paulate | – | – | (Indonesia) Mieke Widjaja | Moses Lim |
| 2000 | (Philippines) Roderick Paulate | (Japan) Keiko Takeshita | – | – | (Singapore) Gurmit Singh (Singapore) Vernetta Lopez |
| 2001 | (Philippines) Raymond Bagatsing | (Singapore) Ivy Lee | – | – | (Singapore) Gurmit Singh (Singapore) Tan Khen Hua |
| 2002 | (Taiwan) Koh Shih Hsun | (Philippines) Aiza Seguerra | – | – | (Singapore) Adrian Pang (Singapore) Irene Ang |
| 2003 | (Singapore) Tou Chung Hua | (Singapore) Vernetta Lopez | – | – | (Singapore) Gurmit Singh (Singapore) Lydia Sun |
| 2004 | (Taiwan) Jack Kao | (Philippines) Eula Valdez | – | – | (Philippines) Michael V. (Singapore) Selena Tam |
| 2005 | (Philippines) Nonie Buencamino | (South Korea) Kim Jung Eun | – | – | (Philippines) Michael V. (Singapore) Selena Tam; Kym Ng |
| 2006 | (Singapore) Mathialagan M | (Thailand) Phiyada Akkrasaranee | – | – | (Philippines) Michael V. (Malaysia) Janet Khoo |
| 2007 | (New Zealand) Antony Starr | (Philippines) Gina Pareño | – | – | (Thailand) Teng Thurstheng (Hong Kong) Myolie Wu |
| 2008 | (Hong Kong) Raymond Lam | (Thailand) Chiranan Manochaem | – | – | (Thailand) Chusak Iamsuk |
| 2009 | (Singapore) Adrian Pang | (Hong Kong) Michelle Yim | – | – | (Thailand) Chusak Iamsuk |
| 2010 | (Hong Kong) Bowie Lam | (Singapore) Rebecca Lim | (Singapore) Lim Kay Tong | (Hong Kong) Susan Tse | (Singapore) Chua En Lai |
| 2011 | (Hong Kong) Kevin Cheng | (Hong Kong) Charmaine Sheh | (Hong Kong) Evergreen Mak | (Hong Kong) Fala Chen | (Singapore) Suhaimi Yusof |
| 2012 | (Hong Kong) Moses Chan | (Singapore) Rui En | (Taiwan) Lucas Luo | (Hong Kong) Nancy Wu | (Singapore) Michelle Chong |
| 2013 | (Taiwan) Chris Wu (Wu Kangren) | (Taiwan) Jade Chou | (Singapore) Jeffrey Xu | (Singapore) Aileen Tan | (Singapore) Chua En Lai |
| 2014 | (Singapore) Pierre Png | (Malaysia) Puteri Balqis Azizi | (Singapore) Rayson Tan | (Taiwan) Hsieh Chiung-Hsuan | (Singapore) Irene Ang |
| 2015 | (China) Zhang Jiayi | (China) Zhou Xun | (Singapore) Lim Kay Tong | (Thailand) Nusba Punnakanta | (Hong Kong) Ivana Wong |
| 2016 | (Taiwan) Lung Shao-hua | (Taiwan) Cheryl Yang | (Singapore) Jeff Catz | (Taiwan) Tien Hsin | (Singapore) Carla Dunareanu |
| 2017 | (Taiwan) Tsai Chen-nan | (Hong Kong) Kara Hui | (Singapore) Zhu Houren | (Taiwan) Yang Kuei-Mei | (Hong Kong) Bobby Au-Yeung |
| 2018 | (Taiwan) Rexen Chang | (South Korea) Kim Nam-joo | (Thailand) Jirayu Tantrakul | (Thailand) Sinjai Plengpanich | |
| 2019 | (China) Tsu-wu Hsieh | (Thailand) Tisanart Sornsuek | (Thailand) Anyarin Terathananpati | (Thailand) Atthaphan Phunsawat | |
| 2020 | (Hong Kong) Anthony Wong | (Taiwan) Yogurt Lee | (India) Barun Sobti | – | |
| 2021 | (Taiwan) Mark Chao | (Japan) Satomi Ishihara | (India) Ranvir Shorey | (Taiwan) Tu Tai-Fong | – |
| 2022 | (Taiwan) Rexen Cheng | (Singapore) Eswari Gunasagar | (Singapore) Jeffrey Xu Mingjie | (Thailand) Prim Chanikan Tangkabodee | – |
| 2023 | (Malaysia) Frederick Lee | (Thailand) Tu Tontawan Tantivejakul | (Taiwan) Sou Gaku | (Taiwan) Yang Li-Yin | – |
| 2024 | (Thailand) Ananda Everingham | (Hong Kong) Charmaine Sheh | (Taiwan) Lan Wei-Hua | (Taiwan) Esther Huang | – |
| 2025 | (Thailand) Sarun Naraprasertkul | – | (Thailand) Gun Attaphan Phunsawat | (Taiwan) Lei Du | – |

| YEAR | Best News Presenter | Best Current Affairs Presenter | Best Entertainment Presenter | Best Sports Presenter |
|---|---|---|---|---|
| 2007 | (Singapore) Martin Soong | (India) Karan Thapar | (Hong Kong) Bobby Chinn | – |
| 2008 | (Singapore) Martin Soong | (Singapore) Christine Tan | (Singapore) Guo Liang | – |
| 2009 | (Singapore) Martin Soong | (Hong Kong) Anjali Rao | (Singapore) Jon Niermann | – |
| 2010 | (Singapore) Martin Soong | (India) Karan Thapar | (Singapore) Bobby Chinn | – |
| 2011 | (Hong Kong) Anna Coren | (Singapore) Bernard Lo | (Singapore) Denise Keller | – |
| 2012 | (Hong Kong) Anna Coren | (India) Barkha Dutt | (Singapore) Oli Pettigrew | (Singapore) Dominic Lau |
| 2013 | (India) Menaka Doshi | (Hong Kong) Stephen Engle | (Thailand) Phanya Nirunkul | (Singapore) Richard Lenton |
| 2014 | (India) Rajdeep Sardesai | (Hong Kong) Kristie Lu Stout | (Singapore) Simon Yin | (Singapore) Andrew “ET” Ettingshausen |
| 2015 | (India) Barkha Dutt | (Malaysia) Steve Chao | (Hong Kong) Nick Baker | (Singapore) Richard Lenton |
| 2020 | (Philippines) Danie Laurel | (Indonesia) Ade Mulya | (Thailand) Varavuth Jentanakul | (Singapore) Michael Schiavello |
| 2021 | (Philippines) Rico Hizon | (India) Anand Narasimhan | (India) Jaaved Jaaferi | (Indonesia) Kartika Berliana |
| 2022 | (Taiwan) Celia Chan | (Singapore) Darren Lim | (Philippines) Maine Mendoza | (Indonesia) Kartika Berliana |
| 2023 | (Philippines) Rico Hizon | (China) Tian Wei | (Philippines) Manila Luzon | (Indonesia) Rama Sugianto |
| 2024 | (India) Kishore Ajwani | (Taiwan) Anne Hu | (China) Meng Fei | (Indonesia) Rama Sugianto |
| 2025 | (Philippines) Charms Espina | – | (Taiwan) Hu Gua, Chen Bing-Li, Lan Lan, York Kuo, Lai Hui-Ru | (Indonesia) Hannisa Sandi |

== Winners ==
=== 1996 ===
| Category | Winners |
|---|---|
| Best Actor in a Leading Role | Roderick Paulate |
| Best Comedy Performance by an Actor/Actress | Moses Lim |
| Best Actress in a Supporting Role | Mieke Widjaja |

=== 2000 ===
| Category | Winners |
|---|---|
| Best Actor in a Leading Role | Roderick Paulate |
| Best Actress in a Leading Role | Keiko Takeshita |
| Best Comedy Performance by an Actor/Actress | Gurmit Singh |
| Best Comedy Performance by an Actor/Actress | Vernetta Lopez |

=== 2001 ===
| Category | Winners |
|---|---|
| Best Actor in a Leading Role | Raymond Bagatsing |
| Best Actress in a Leading Role | Ivy Lee |
| Best Comedy Performance by an Actor/Actress | Gurmit Singh |
| Best Comedy Performance by an Actor/Actress | Tan Khen Hua |

=== 2002 ===
| Category | Winners |
|---|---|
| Best Actor in a Leading Role | Koh Shih Hsun |
| Best Actress in a Leading Role | Aiza Seguerra |
| Best Comedy Performance by an Actor/Actress | Adrian Pang |
| Best Comedy Performance by an Actor/Actress | Irene Ang |

=== 2003 ===
| Category | Winners |
|---|---|
| Best Actor in a Leading Role | Tou Chung Hua |
| Best Actress in a Leading Role | Vernetta Lopez |
| Best Comedy Performance by an Actor/Actress | Gurmit Singh |
| Best Comedy Performance by an Actor/Actress | Lydia Sun |

=== 2004 ===
| Category | Winners |
|---|---|
| Best Documentary Programme (30 minutes or less) | "Body Snatchers of Bangkok" from National Geographic Channel (Asia) |
| Best Documentary Programme (31 minutes or more) | "Mysterious Hanging Coffins of China" from Discovery Channel and "50 Years of Overseas Adoption of Korean Children" from Munhwa Broadcasting Channel 11 (Joint winners) |
| Best Natural History or Wildlife Programme | "Face to Face with the Ice Bear" from NHK Digital Hi-Vision Channel |
| Best News Programme | Channel i News from SPH MediaWorks Channel i |
| Best Single News Story/Report (10 minutes or less) | Terrorist Bombing of UN Headquarters in Iraq from NHK General TV Channel |
| Best News/Current Affairs Special | "Family Bond – Give Us Back Our Father" from Tokyo Broadcasting System |
| Best Current Affairs Programme | The Impeachment of President Roh from Munhwa Broadcasting Channel 11 |
| Best Social Awareness Programme | "Pijar" from PT Surya Citra Televisi |
| Best Comedy Programme | "Bubble Gang" from GMA Network Channel 7 (Philippines) |
| Best Entertainment (One-off/Annual) | MTV Asia Award 2004 from MTV Networks Asia |
| Best Entertainment Programme | "Masquerade" from Nippon Television Network |
| Best Drama Series | "Damo The Legendary Police Woman" from Munhwa Broadcasting Channel 11 |
| Best Docu-drama | "HONKOWA – True Horror Stories" from Fuji Television |
| Best Reality Programme | "Dunia Lain – Lawang Sewu" PT Televisi Transformasi Indonesia |
| Best Game or Quiz Programme | "Fan Pan Tae" from Royal Thai TV Channel 5 |
| Best Music Programme | "Shi-Bu-Ki" from Yomiuri Telecasting Channel 10 |
| Best Talk Show | "The Big Fight – Has the Time Come to End the Beauty Contest" from NDTV 24X7 |
| Best Live Event Coverage | Big [V] Concert frin Star India, Channel [V] |
| Best Children's Programme | "Fruity Pie – Lin Lin's Story" from Public Television Service |
| Best Infotainment Programme | "Love House" from Munhwa Broadcasting Channel 11 |
| Best Animation | "Gokusen" from Nippon Television Network |
| Best Single Drama/Telemovie | "Our Memories of the Sugarcane Field" from Tokyo Broadcasting System |
| Best News Anchor of Asia | Arnab Goswami for "News night" of NDTV 24×7 |

=== 2005 ===
- Best Documentary Programme (30 minutes or less) : "Building Site" from Dalian Television, China
- Best Documentary Programme (31 minutes or more) : "Little School Children" from Shanghai Media Group, Dragon TV, China
- Best Natural History or Wildlife Programme : "A Flash of Blue" from NHK Digital Hi-Vision Channel
- Best News Programme : Waves of Destruction from NDTV 24X7, India
- Best Single News Story/Report (10 minutes or less) : "Rebel Impasse" from Ocean Vista Films Ltd, Hong Kong
- Best Current Affairs Programme : "FTV's Hall of Dissent" from Formosa Television, Channel 53, Taiwan
- Best Social Awareness Programme : "i-Witness: The GMA Documentaries – Skin and Bones (Buto't Balat)" from GMA Channel 7, Philippines
- Best Comedy Programme : "Daddy's Girls – Lulu's Special Strawberry Cream Cake" written by Ong Su Mann.
- Best Entertainment (One-off/Annual) : "Eat Bulaga! Silver Special" from GMA Network, Philippines
- Best Entertainment Programme : "Masquerade" from Nippon Television, Japan
- Best Drama Series : "Damo: The Legendary Police Woman" from Munhwa Broadcasting Corporation 11, South Korea
- Best Docu-drama : "HONKOWA – True Horror Stories" from Fuji Television, Japan
- Best Reality Programme : "Dance Competition" PT Televisi Transformasi Indonesia
- Best Game or Quiz Programme : "Fan Pan Tae" from RTA5
- Best Music Programme : "Shi-Bu-Ki" from Yomiuri Telecasting Channel 10
- Best Talk Show : "Macam Macam Aznil" from Astro Ria, Malaysia
- Best Live Event Coverage : Big [V] Concert frin Star India, Channel [V]
- Best Children's Programme : "Fruity Pie – Lin Lin's Story" from Public Television Service
- Best Infotainment Programme : "Love House" from Munhwa Broadcasting Corporation 11, South Korea
- Best Animation : "Pozzie" from Nippon Television, Japan
- Best Single Drama/Telemovie : "Our Memories of the Sugarcane Field" from Tokyo Broadcasting System, Japan
- Best Terrestrial Channel of the Year : GMA Network, Inc., Philippines

=== 2006 ===
Programming

- Best Documentary Programme (30 minutes or less) : "My Treasures" by Shanghai Media Group, Documentary Channel (China)
- Best Documentary Programme (31 minutes or more) : "You are My Destiny" by Munhwa Broadcasting Corp (MBC) (Korea)
- Best Natural History or Wildlife Programme : "Korea Last Survivor – Mystery Uncovered "Copper-winged Bat" by Korean Broadcasting System (Korea)
- Best News Programme : "CNN Today" by CNN International (Hong Kong)
- Best Single News Story/Report (10 minutes or less) : "Hunger Deaths" by New Delhi Television Limited, NDTV 24x7 (India)
- Best Current Affairs Programme : "Uncovering the Scientific Fraud of the Century" by Munhwa Broadcasting Corp (MBC) (Korea)
- Best Social Awareness Programme : "Unanswered Questions – Single Young Fathers" by Seoul Broadcasting System, Channel 6 (Korea)
- Best Comedy Programme : "The Ghost Doctor" by Scenario Co. Ltd., 9MCOT (Thailand)
- Best Entertainment (One-off/Annual) : "Hong Kong Disneyland Grand Opening Special" by Walt Disney Television International (Asia Pacific), Television Broadcast Ltd (Hong Kong), Jade Channel (Hong Kong)
- Best Entertainment Programme : "The Man's World Show #1" by SPE Networks – Asia Pte Ltd, AXN Asia (Singapore)
- Best Drama Series : "A Love to Kill" by Korean Broadcasting System, KBS TV2 (Korea)
- Best Docu-drama : "Voice Recorder" by Tokyo Broadcasting System Inc, Tokyo Broadcasting System Television Inc (Japan)
- Best Reality Programme : "Real Situations Saturday – Changing our Child's Behaviour" by Seoul Broadcasting System, Channel 6 (Korea)
- Best Game or Quiz Programme : "NEP League" by Fuji Television Network Inc (Japan)
- Best Music Programme : "Leo & Miriam Special 2005" by Television Broadcasts Limited, TVB, Jade Channel
- Best Talk Show : "Republic Benar – Benar Mabok (BBM)" by PT. Indosiar Visual Mandiri, Indosiar (Indonesia)
- Best Live Event Coverage : "Hunger Deaths" by New Delhi Television Limited, NDTV 24x7 (India)
- Best Children's Programme : "Todsagun Kid Game" by Workpoint Entertainment Public Company Ltd, 9MCOT (Thailand)
- Best Infotainment Programme : "Where the Queue Starts" by MediaCorp Pte Ltd, Mediacorp TV's 8 (Singapore)
- Best Animation : "Republic Benar – Benar Mabok (BBM)" by PT. Indosiar Visual Mandiri, Indosiar (Indonesia)
- Best Single Drama/Telemovie : "Hiroshima – August 6th 1945" by Tokyo Broadcasting System, Inc, TBS, Channel 6 (Japan)

Performance

- Best News Presenter or Anchor : Kristie Lu Stout for "CNN Today" by CNN International (Hong Kong)
- Best Current Affairs Presenter : Stan Grant for "Pakistan Earthquake Rising From The Ruins" by CNN International (Hong Kong)
- Best Entertainment Presenter : Phanya Nirunkul for "Todsagun Kid Game" Workpoint Entertainment Public Company Ltd, 9MCOT (Thailand)
- Best Drama Performance by an Actor : Mathialagan M for "Accidental Accident – Padigal (6 Stages of life)" Blue River Pictures Pte Ltd, MediaCorp TV12, Vasantham Central (Singapore)
- Best Drama Performance by an Actress : Phiyada Akkraseranee for "Hua Jai Chocolate (Heart Of Chocolate)" Scenario Co Ltd, Royal Thai Army Television, Channel 5 (Thailand)
- Best Comedy Performance by an Actor : Michael V for "Bubble Gang GMA Network Inc" (Philippines)
- Best Comedy Performance by an Actress : Janet Khoo for "Mat Dom Teksi" Double Vision Sdn Bhd, Radio Television Malaysia, RTM 1 (Malaysia)

=== 2007 ===
==== Programming ====
| Category | Winner | Runner-up | Highly commanded |
|---|---|---|---|
| Best Children's Program | (Thailand) Todsagun Kid Game (Workpoint Entertainment) | (Australia) Hi-5 (Southern Star Group) | (Malaysia) Breeze Padang Pintar (Red Communications) |
| Best Animation | (South Korea) The Fairies of Crystal, Z Squad (Seoul Broadcasting System) | (Taiwan) Samiyam (Eastern Broadcasting Co. Ltd) | (South Korea) Pororo Singalong (Iconix Entertainment) |
| Best Half-Hour Documentary Programme | (Hong Kong) Aids Orphan (Asia Television) | (Singapore) The First Time Film Makers 2006 – Art Factory (Discovery Network Asia) | (Indonesia) “Suster Apung” (The Floating Nurse) (Metro TV) |
| Best Social Awareness Programme | (Japan) The Kobe “A” Case – 10 years for Both Victims & Assailant (Yomiuri Telecasting Corporation) | (Singapore) Gateway Asia – Old Yang Seeks Bride (Discovery Network Asia) | (United States) Super Cells (National Geographic Channel International) |
| Best Current Affairs Programme | (Philippines) Reporter's Notebook : Giyera sa Lebanon (War in Lebanon) (GMA Network, Inc.) | (South Korea) Risky Secrets of Dental Clinics (Munhwa Broadcasting Corporation) | (Singapore) Man Made Marvels in China – Highest Railway in The World and Gateway Asia (Discovery Network Asia) (Singapore) China's Raging Sandstorms (Discovery Network Asia) |
| Best Natural History & Wildlife Programme | (India) Wild Dog Diaries (National Geographic Channel) | (Australia) The Floating Brothel (Essential Viewing) | (Singapore) Cricket Warriors (Discovery Network Asia) |
| Best One-Hour Documentary Programme | (Hong Kong) Super Cells (Asia Television) | (South Korea) Renate Hong's Longing Song For Her Husband “Hope To See You Again” (JoongAng Media Network) | (Japan) Hiroshima – Voice Without A Voice (Mainichi Broadcasting System) |
| Best Single News / Report | (Qatar) Kylie Grey's Agent Orange (Al Jazeera English) | (India) Republic Of Hunger – Hunger Under Your Highrise (New Delhi Television Limited) | (United States) Dujana Speaks (CNN International) |
| Best News Programme | (Philippines) Subic Rape Case Promulgation (ABS-CBN) | (Qatar) KL News Half Hour Bulletin – Al Jazeera News (Al Jazeera English) | (Philippines) TV Patrol World – Taguig Hostage Drama (ABS-CBN) |
| Best Game / Quiz Programme | (Taiwan) Bingo Pool (Star Group Ltd) | (Thailand) Black Box (Workpoint Entertainment) | (Thailand) Fan Pan Tae (Workpoint Entertainment) (Philippines) Are You Game?Game Ka Na Ba? (ABS-CBN) |
| Best Reality Programme | (China) Mountain Call & Sea Shout of Deformation Plan (Hunan Broadcasting System) | (Thailand) Fight For Mom... Backpack (Workpoint Entertainment) | (South Korea) Doctors (Munhwa Broadcasting Corporation) |
| Best Infotainment Programme | (Taiwan) Anti Fraud Squad – Sweepstake Scams (Public Television Service) | (Japan) But It's So Hard To Lose Weight (NHK) | (Singapore) True Asian Horror (Discovery Network Asia) |
| Best Talk Show | (India) We The People : The Veil Debate (NDTV) | (China) Murmur Of Life: Pay Me A Justice (Shanghai Media Group) | Rendezvous With Simi Garewal (STAR India) |
| Best Music Programme | MTV Unplugged : Tomoyasu Hotel (MTV Japan) | (Singapore) Frequency Of The City 2 (MediaCorp TV 12) | (Hong Kong) Teresa & Lam 2007 (TVB) |
| Best Entertainment (One Off / Annual Special) | (Japan) Tofukuji Sound Stage (Mainichi Broadcasting System) | (Japan) 31 Legged Race 2006 – 30 kids 31 Legs (TV Asahi) | 2007 Top Challenges Show (China Central Television) |
| Best Entertainment Programme | MTV Jammed : Angel Aki (MTV Japan) | Boogie Woogie (Sony Entertainment Television (India)) | MTV Boiling Points: Malaysia Edition (MTV Southeast Asia) (South Korea) Happy Together Friends (Korean Broadcasting System) |
| Best Comedy Programme | (Thailand) Pentor (Scenario Co. Ltd) | (Singapore) Parental Guidance (MediaCorp Channel 5) | (India) The Week That Wasn't (CNN-IBN) |
| Best Single Drama / Telemovie | (Japan) Our War (Tokyo Broadcasting System) (Australia) Wire in the Blood (Southern Star Group) | (Singapore) Stories of Love- Ep 5(My time with Ah Gong) (MediaCorp) | (Taiwan) Game of Loneliness (Public Television Service) (Japan) Nobunaga's Coffin (TV Asahi) |
| Best Drama Series | (Japan) The Vultures (NHK) | (Japan) Nodame Cantabile (Fuji Television) | (China) The Great Revival (CCTV-8) |

==== Performance ====
| Category | Winner | Runner-up | Highly commanded |
|---|---|---|---|
| Best Current Affairs Presenter | (India) Karan Thapar for Devil's Advocate (CNN-IBN) | (Hong Kong) Anjali Rao (CNN International) | (Indonesia) Najwa Shihab (Metro TV) |
| Best News Presenter / Anchor | (Singapore) Martin Soong for Asia Squawk Box (CNBC Asia) | (Hong Kong) Hugh Riminton for CNN Today (CNN International) | (Australia) Deane Hutton for Science Stories on Seven News Adelaide (Infotainment International) |
| Best Entertainment Presenter | (Vietnam) Bobby Chinn for World Cafe Asia (Discovery Network Asia) | (Singapore) Denise Keller for MTV Pop Inc. (MTV Asia) | (Philippines) Phanya Nirunku for Black Box (Workpoint Entertainment) Janet Hsieh for Fun Taiwan – Orchid Island (Discovery Network Asia) |
| Best Comedy Performance by an Actress | (Hong Kong) Myolie Wu for To Grow with Love (TVB) | (Singapore) Jessica Hsuan for Parental Guidance (MediaCorp Channel 5) | (Thailand) Roonthong Ruamthong for My Beloved Captain (TV Thunder) |
| Best Comedy Performance by an Actor | (Thailand) Teng Thurstheng for Raberd Thurtheung (Workpoint Entertainment) | (Philippines) Michael V. for Bubble Gang (GMA Network) | (Singapore) Adrian Pang for Maggi & Me (MediaCorp Channel 5) |
| Best Drama Performance by an Actress | (Philippines) Gina Pareño for Remembering (ABS-CBN) | (New Zealand) Robyn Malcolm for Outrageous Fortune (South Pacific Pictures) Achint Kaur for Virrudh (Sony Entertainment Television (India)) | (Singapore) Andrea De Cruz for Do Not Disturb – Lunch Hour (MediaCorp TV 12) |
| Best Drama Performance by an Actor | (New Zealand) Antony Starr for Outrageous Fortune (South Pacific Pictures) | (Thailand) Shahkrit Yamnarm for The Lady Of Sangsoon (Exact Co. Ltd / Scenario Co. Ltd) | (India) Rajeev Khandelwal for Left Right Left (SAB TV) |

==== Technical ====
| Category | Winner | Runner-up | Highly commanded |
|---|---|---|---|
| Best Editing | (Singapore) Five Star Insider-Seven Seas Cruise (Discovery Network Asia) | (United States) Kung Fu Monk (National Geographic Channel International) | (Singapore) Born Again Buddhist (Discovery Network Asia) |
| Best Cinematography | (Singapore) Born Again Buddhist (Discovery Network Asia) | (Singapore) Hyper Rescue Tokyo (Infcocus Asia) | (Singapore) Outback Cowboys (Discovery Network Asia) |
| Best Direction | (Singapore) Born Again Buddhist (Discovery Network Asia) | (United States) Super Cells (National Geographic Channel International) | (New Zealand) Outrageous Fortune Sr. 2 Ep. 16 (South Pacific Pictures) (Singapore) Geisha Girl (Infocus Asia) |
| Terrestrial Broadcaster of the Year | (Singapore) Mediacorp | (Philippines) ABS-CBN | (Japan) NHK |
| Cable / Satellite Network of the Year | (Singapore) Discovery Network Asia | (United States) National Geographic Channel | MTV Japan |

=== 2008 ===
==== Programming ====
| Category | Winner | Highly Commended |
|---|---|---|
| Best Documentary Programme (30 mins or less) | (Singapore) China 21 – The People's Dumplings (Discovery Channel Asia) | (Qatar) The Lost Tribe – Secret Army of the CIA (Al Jazeera English) (Singapore) Spirit Of the Times – Chinese Contemporary (Channel NewsAsia) |
| Best Documentary Programme (31 mins or more) | (Japan) Big Wall Challenge (NHK) | (Japan) A Bride, her last message – a 24 Year old who battled breast cancer (Tokyo Broadcasting System) (Singapore) Brat Camp China (National Geographic Channel Asia) |
| Best Natural History / Wildlife Programme or Docu-drama | (Singapore) Kingdom of Elephants (Discovery Channel Asia) | (Singapore) Soul of a River – Cambodia (Discovery Channel Asia) (Singapore) Soul of a River – China (Discovery Channel Asia) |
| Best News Programme | (Hong Kong) CNN Today (CNN International) | (Hong Kong) News At Seven: Magnitude-8 Sichuan Earthquake (i-CABLE News) (Hong Kong) News At Seven: Quake Relief Day Four (i-CABLE News) |
| Best Single News Story / Report | (Hong Kong) Sichuan Earthquake: Landslide (Now TV) | (Hong Kong) China Quake Wedding (CNN International) (Hong Kong) China Quake Orphan by Kyung Lah (CNN International) |
| Best Drama Series | (Japan) Galileo (Fuji Television) | (Japan) Rookies (Tokyo Broadcasting System) (South Korea) Yi San Munhwa Broadcasting Corporation) |
| Best Single Drama or Telemovie Programme | Singapore Short Story Project: The Other (Mediacorp) | (Japan) Sorapuchi (Hokkaido Television Broadcasting) (Singapore) Manam Series 2 – Ep. 7 (Mediacorp) |
| Best Comedy Programme | (Philippines) Camera Café (Euro-Asia Media Group) | (Philippines) Bubble Gang (GMA Network) (Thailand) Raberd Thurd Theung (Workpoint Entertainment) |
| Best Current Affairs Programme | (Qatar) Inside Myanmar – The Crackdown (Al Jazeera English) | (Qatar) The Lost Tribe – Secret Army of the CIA (Al Jazeera English) (Qatar) People & Power – Coal Face (Al Jazeera English) |
| Best Children's Programme | (Singapore) R.E.M. – The Next Generation (MediaCorp) | (India) Galli Galli Sim Sim Ep. 3: Chamki Karate (Miditech Pvt. Ltd.) (Australia) Blue Water High (Southern Star Group) |
| Best Entertainment (One-Off / Annual) | (Singapore) Wedding Affair Grand Finals (MediaCorp) | POGO Amazing Kids Awards 2007 (Turner International India) |
| Best Entertainment Programme | (China) Happy Camp (Hunan Broadcasting System) | (China) Celebrity Coach (Jiangsu Broadcasting Corporation) |
| Best Game or Quiz Programme | (Thailand) Lharn Poo Koo E-Joo (Workpoint Entertainment) | (Thailand) Fan Pan Tae (Workpoint Entertainment) (Hong Kong) Foodie 2 Shoes # 13 (TVB) (Thailand) Yok Siam (Workpoint Entertainment) |
| Best Music Programme | (Japan) Kinkakuji Sound Stage (Mainichi Broadcasting System) | (Malaysia) AF6 Finale (Astro Production Sdn Bhd) (Malaysia) Vidiya Vidiya Kondaduvom (Astro Production Sdn Bhd) |
| Best Reality Programme | (South Korea) Nature's Platform – Desserted Dogs for Evacuated Village (Seoul Broadcasting System) | (Philippines) Reunions (GMA Network) |
| Best Infotainment Programme | (Singapore) All Things Paper (CNA) | (Singapore) Lead Me On (Mediacorp) (Singapore) Tale of Four Cities (CNA) |
| Best Talk Show | (Hong Kong) TalkAsia (CNN International) | Love Just Ain't Enough (China Business Network Co., Ltd TV) (India) State of the Nation (Global Broadcast News) |
| Best Animation | (Australia) Dogstar – Ep. 16 "Hounded" (Media World Pictures) | (India) Ostrich (Miditech Pvt. Ltd.) (Japan) Hoshi Shinichi's Short Shorts (NHK) |
| Best Social Awareness Programme | (Singapore) Robot Jockey (National Geographic Channel Asia) | (Singapore) China 21 – Green Wall of China (Discovery Channel Asia) (China) Moving Mountains (Beijing Key Frame Cultural Development Co., Ltd.) |
| Best Adaptation of an Existing Formats | (Singapore) The Amazing Race Asia Season 2 (Ep. 11) (AXN Asia) | (India) Skatoony (Turner Entertainment) |

==== Performance ====
| Category | Winner | Highly Commended |
|---|---|---|
| Best News Presenter or Anchor | (Singapore) Martin Soong for Asia Squawk Box (CNBC Asia) | (Hong Kong) Kristie Lu Stout for CNN Today (CNN International) (Hong Kong) Hugh Riminton for CNN Today (CNN International) |
| Best Current Affairs Presenter | (Singapore) Christine Tan for Managing Asia (CNBC Asia) | (India) Vikram Chandra for The Big Fight (NDTV) (Hong Kong) Anjali Rao for TalkAsia (CNN International) (India) Karan Thapar for Devil's Advocate (CNN-IBN) |
| Best Entertainment Presenter | (Singapore) Guo Liang for Lead Me On (Mediacorp) (Singapore) Quan Yi Fong for Buzzing Cashier (Mediacorp) | (Malaysia) Aznil Haji Nawawi for Jangan Lupa Lirik! (Astro Holdings Sdn Bhd) (Thailand) Phanya Nirunkul for Black Box (Workpoint Entertainment) |
| Best Drama Performance by an Actor | (Hong Kong) Raymond Lam for The Master of Tai Chi (TVB) | (Singapore) Lim Kay Tong for En Bloc (MediaCorp) (Singapore) Patrick Teoh for En Bloc (MediaCorp) |
| Best Drama Performance by an Actress | (Thailand) Chiranan Manochaem for The Slave (Bangkok Broadcasting & TV Co., Ltd.) | (Taiwan) Pan Li-Li for Artemisia (Public Television Service) (Thailand) Piyathida Woramusik for The Slave (Bangkok Broadcasting & TV Co., Ltd.) |
| Best Comedy Performance by an Actor/Actress | (Thailand) Chusak Iamsuk for Raberd Thurd Theung (Workpoint Entertainment) | (Philippines) Ogie Alcasid for Bubble Gang (GMA Network) (Singapore) Michelle Chong for Sayang Sayang (MediaCorp) |

==== Technical ====
| Category | Winner | Highly Commended |
|---|---|---|
| Best Cinematography | (Singapore) Kingdom of Elephants (Discovery Channel Asia) | (Singapore) Soul of a River – China (Discovery Channel Asia) (Singapore) Revealed Hajj (Discovery Channel Asia) |
| Best Direction | (Singapore) Kingdom of Elephants (Discovery Channel Asia) | (Singapore) China 21 – Go Buddha Boys Discovery Channel Asia) (Singapore) Portraits of Taiwan – Jimmy Liao (Discovery Channel Asia) |
| Best Editing | (Singapore) Ultimate Olympics – Go Beijing (Discovery Channel Asia) | (Singapore) Take off – The A380 Saga (Discovery Channel Asia) (Singapore) Man Made Marvel – Beijing Airport (Discovery Channel Asia) |
| Terrestrial Broadcaster of the Year | (Singapore) Mediacorp | (Philippines) GMA Network |
| Cable / Satellite Network of the Year | (Hong Kong) Discovery Channel Asia | (Hong Kong) CNN International |

=== 2009 ===
==== Programming ====
| Category | Winner | Highly Commended |
|---|---|---|
| Best Documentary Programme (30 mins or less) | (Hong Kong) 6420 (Now TV) | (Hong Kong) Dan Rivers – Killings Fields: Long Road to Justice (CNN International) (Hong Kong) Dan Rivers – World's Untold Stories: A Forgotten People (CNN International) |
| Best Documentary Programme (31 mins or more) | (Japan) Yanomami: The Last Tribe (NHK) | (Japan) PAMIR – Cradled by the Skies (Kansai Telecasting Corporation) |
| Best Natural History / Wildlife Programme orDocu-drama | (Hong Kong) Wild China (BBC Worldwide) | (Australia) Death of the Megabeasts (Prospero Productions) |
| Best News Programme | (India) Election Counting Day Coverage (CNN-IBN) | (Hong Kong) CNN Today (CNN International) |
| Best Single News Story / Report | (Hong Kong) John Vause – China / Gold Machine (CNN International) | (Hong Kong) Kyung Lah – Japan / Elderly Shoplifters (CNN International) |
| Best Drama Series | (Singapore) The Little Nyonya (Mediacorp) (Taiwan) 1895 in Formosa (Hakka TV) | (Australia) City Homicide Season 2 (Episode 2) (Seven Network) (Japan) The Samurai Gentleman (Episode 1): Road to Destiny (NHK) |
| Best Single Drama or Telemovie Programme | (Taiwan) Easy Money (Hakka TV) | (Australia) Scorched (Nine Network) (Taiwan) Love in the Season of Osmanthus (Hakka TV) |
| Best Comedy Programme | (Japan) The Iromonea (NHK) | (South Korea) Gag Concert (Korean Broadcasting System) |
| Best Current Affairs Programme | (Hong Kong) Sunday Report: Sichuan Earthquake One Year On – The Unspeakable Truth (TVB Jade) | (Indonesia) Drugs Business Inside Prison Cell (ANTV) |
| Best Children's Programme | (Thailand) Super Kid Game (Workpoint Entertainment) | (Thailand) Classroom Genius (Workpoint Entertainment) |
| Best Entertainment (One-Off / Annual) | (Singapore) My School Rocks Asia Finals 2008 (Disney Channel) | (Singapore) President's Command Performance (Mediacorp) |
| Best Entertainment Programme | (Japan) 26 Hours / Day (Tokyo Broadcasting System) | (Japan) The Best House 1,2,3 – The Discovery of New Da Vinci? (Fuji Television) |
| Best Game or Quiz Programme | (Japan) Run for Money (Fuji Television) | (Thailand) Lharn Poo Koo E-Joo (Workpoint Entertainment) |
| Best Music Programme | (India) Indian Idol 4 (Episode 1) (Miditech Pvt. Ltd.) | (Singapore) Hip Korea – Rain (Discovery Channel Asia) |
| Best Reality Programme | (Singapore) Revealed – Chinese New Year (Discovery Channel Asia) | (Singapore) Storm Surfers (Discovery Channel Asia) |
| Best Infotainment Programme | (Japan) The New Anatomy Show (NHK) | (Singapore) Hip Korea – Rain (Discovery Channel Asia) |
| Best Talk Show | (India) We the People (NDTV 24x7) | (Singapore) Blogtv.sg: Who Lives Around You? (Channel NewsAsia) |
| Best Animation | Little Krishna – Assault of the Lethal Bird (Nickelodeon India) | (Australia) The Adventures of Bottle Top Bill and His Best Friend Corky (Australian Broadcasting Corporation) |
| Best Social Awareness Programme | (Singapore) Inside Afghan ER (National Geographic Channel Asia) | (Singapore) Ecopolis (Discovery Channel Asia) (Singapore) Future Makers (Discovery Channel Asia) |
| Best Adaptation of an Existing Formats | (Singapore) The Amazing Race Asia Season 3 (Ep. 3) (AXN Asia) | Project Runway Philippines (ETC) |
| Best Cross-Platform Content | (Singapore) Hip Korea – Rain (Discovery Channel Asia) | (Japan) BITWORLD-Two Rooms: The Past and The Present (NHK) |

==== Performance ====
| Category | Winner | Highly Commended |
|---|---|---|
| Best News Presenter or Anchor | (Singapore) Martin Soong for Asia Squawk Box (CNBC Asia) | (Hong Kong) Kristie Lu Stout for CNN Today (CNN International) |
| Best Current Affairs Presenter | (Hong Kong) Anjali Rao for TalkAsia (CNN International) | (Indonesia) Najwa Shihab for Suara Anda (The Election Channel Programs) (MetroTV) |
| Best Entertainment Presenter | (Singapore) Jon Niermann for Asia Uncut (Star World) | (Hong Kong) Cyrus Sahukar for Hole in the Wall – Season 1 (Episode 1) (Cartoon Network) (Thailand) Phanya Nirunkul for Yok Siam (Workpoint Entertainment) |
| Best Drama Performance by an Actor | (Singapore) Adrian Pang for Red Thread (Mediacorp) | (Singapore) Qi Yuwu for The Little Nyonya (Mediacorp) |
| Best Drama Performance by an Actress | (Hong Kong) Michelle Yim for Moonlight Resonance (TVB Jade) | (New Zealand) Robyn Malcolm for Outrageous Fortune (TV3) |
| Best Comedy Performance by an Actor/Actress | (Thailand) Chusak Iamsuk for Raberd Thurd Theung (Workpoint Entertainment) | (Singapore) Chua En Lai for Parental Guidance (Mediacorp) (Philippines) Michael V. for Bubble Gang (GMA Network) |

==== Technical ====
| Category | Winner | Highly Commended |
|---|---|---|
| Best Cinematography | (Singapore) Lonely Planet: Natural Born Traveller (Episode 3) (Discovery Channel Asia) | (Singapore) The Way We Live – Living in the Shadow of the Volcano (Episode 5) |
| Best Direction | (Australia) All Saints (Episode 465) (Seven Network) | (Singapore) Sudden Death (National Geographic Channel Asia) |
| Best Editing | (Japan) Supermen of Malegaon (BS-1) | (Singapore) Inside Afghan ER (National Geographic Channel Asia) |
| Best Achievement in HD | (Singapore) Storm Surfers (Discovery Networks Asia-Pacific) | (Singapore) Inside Afghan ER (National Geographic Channel Asia) |
| Terrestrial Broadcaster of the Year | (Japan) Tokyo Broadcasting System Television | (Hong Kong) TVB Jade |
| Cable / Satellite Network of the Year | (Singapore) Discovery Channel | (Hong Kong) CNN International |

=== 2010 ===
==== Programming ====
| Category | Winner | Highly Commended |
|---|---|---|
| Best Documentary Programme (30 mins or less) | (Hong Kong) Eco Solutions – Saving Sumatra (CNN International) | (India) Toxic (CNN-IBN) |
| Best Documentary Programme (31 mins or more) | (South Korea) Story of Seung-il: What It Means To Live (Seoul Broadcasting System) | (South Korea) Animal Engineering Feats Part 1 – Architects of the Wild (Korean Broadcasting System 1 TV) |
| Best Natural History or Wildlife Programme | (Singapore) Among the Great Apes with Michelle Yeoh (National Geographic Channel Asia) | (Singapore) Eco Taiwan – Species War (Discovery Channel, Hitech Vision Productions) |
| Best News Programme | India At 9 (CNN-IBN) | (Philippines) 24 Oras (24 Hours): Maguindanao Massacre (GMA Network) |
| Best Single News Story/Report | (Taiwan) After the Cheonan: The First Glimpse Inside North Korea (Formosa Television) | (Hong Kong) Men in Black (CNN International) (India) Toxic Story (CNN-IBN) |
| Best Drama Series | (China) Changes (Jiangsu Broadcasting Corporation) | (Japan) Jin (Tokyo Broadcasting System Television) |
| Best Single Drama or Telemovie Programme | (South Korea) Father's Home (Seoul Broadcasting System) | (Singapore) Angel (MediaCorp, Verite Productions Pte, Ltd.) |
| Best Comedy Programme | (Singapore) The Noose 3 (MediaCorp) | (Malaysia) Gelanggang Raja Lawak Akhir (Astro Prima) |
| Best Current Affairs Programme | (Singapore) 921 Earthquake Special (Discovery Channel, Imaging Image Production, Ltd.) | (Singapore) Changemakers – Energy (Discovery Channel, Off the Fence B.V.) |
| Best Children's Programme | (Japan) Discover Science: Let's See the Speed of Sound (NHK, Al Jazeera Children's Channel) | (Japan) Rise and Shine! (NHK) |
| Best Entertainment (One-off/Annual) | (Singapore) MTV World Stage VMAJ 2010 (MTV Networks Asia, SKY PerfecTV!, MTV Japan) | (India) Jai Jawan with Abishek Bachchan NDTV 24×7 (Malaysia) Shout! Awards 2009 (8TV) |
| Best Entertainment Programme | (Singapore) World Café Middle East – Istanbul (Discovery Channel, Pilot Films & Television Productions, Ltd.) | (Singapore) Cyril: Simply Magic (Season 1, Episode 1) (AXN Asia, Infocus Asia, Edit Lounge, 2XJump Media) |
| Best Game or Quiz Programme | (Malaysia) Jangan Lupa Lirik! (Astro Ria) | (Thailand) Yok Siam 10 Kor (Workpoint Entertainment, 9MCOT) |
| Best Music Programme | Singapore Idol 2009 (Finals)(MediaCorp) | (Singapore) MTV World Stage Live in Malaysia 2009 (MTV Networks Asia) (Japan) A Passionate Challenger, Alice Sara Ott: Born to be a Pianist (Mainichi Broadcasting System) |
| Best Reality Programme | (Singapore) Storm Surfers – New Zealand (Discovery Channel, 6ixty Foot Films Pte, Ltd.) | (Singapore) Living with a Superstar (Episode 1)(TLC, Blue Mango Films) |
| Best Infotainment Programme | (Singapore) Culinary Asia – Japan (Discovery Channel, Threesixzero Productions Pte, Ltd.) | (Singapore) Hip Korea: Kim Yu Na(Discovery Channel, Bang Singapore Pte, Ltd.) |
| Best Talk Show | (India) Betrayal of Bhopal (NDTV 24×7) | (India) Devil's Advocate (CNN-IBN) (India) We the People: Breaking the Stereotype (NDTV 24×7) |
| Best Animation | Star Wars: The Clone Wars – The Mandalore Plot (MediaCorp, Lucasfilm Animation Company Singapore B.V.) | (Taiwan) The Little Chestnut of Tang Dynasty (Da Ai TV) |
| Best Social Awareness Programme | (Singapore) Womb of the World (National Geographic Channel, Pulse Media Pvt Ltd.) | (Singapore) Almost Famous – Close-up for the Kathoey (Episode 1) (Channel NewsAsia, Vertigo Pictures Pte Ltd.) |
| Best Adaptation of an Existing Formats | (South Korea) Project Runway Korea 2 (On Style, Orion Cinema Network Corporation) | (South Korea) The Moment of Truth Korea (QTV, Del Media) |
| Best Cross-Platform Content | (India) Citizen Journalist Show (CNN-IBN) | Culinary Asia – Japan (Discovery Channel, Threesixzero Productions Pte Ltd) (Singapore) Hip Korea: Kim Yu Na (Discovery Channel, Bang Singapore Pte Ltd) |
| Best Lifestyle Program | (Singapore) Passage to Malaysia – The Cradle(TLC, Reel Networks Sdn Bhd) | (Singapore) Living with a Superstar (Episode 1)(TLC, Blue Mango Films) |

==== Performance ====
| Category | Winner | Highly Commended |
|---|---|---|
| Best News Presenter or Anchor | (Singapore) Martin Soong for Squawk Box (CNBC Asia Pacific) | (Hong Kong) Anjali Rao for World Report (CNN International) (Singapore) Karen Tso for Squawk Box (CNBC Asia Pacific) |
| Best Current Affairs Presenter | Karan Thapar for Devil's Advocate IBN18 Network Ltd CNN-IBN India | (Hong Kong) Anjali Rao for Talk Asia (CNN International) |
| Best Entertainment Presenter | (Singapore) Bobby Chinn for World Café Middle East – Istanbul (Discovery Channel, Pilot Films & Television Productions Ltd.) | Cathy Cheng for Entertainers on Stage (Live) i-Cable Entertainment Limited, Hong Kong Cable Television, Cable Entertainment News) |
| Best Actor in a Leading Role | (Hong Kong) Bowie lam for Sister of Pearl (Television Broadcasts Limited) | (Taiwan) Chang Shan-Wei for The Pioneers (Hakka Television Station) |
| Best Actress in a Leading Role | (Singapore) Rebecca Lim for The Pupil (Mediacorp) | (Taiwan) Yang Gui-Mei for The Grass Green Sky (Da Ai TV) (Taiwan) Pan Li-Li for The Addict (Da Ai TV) |
| Best Actor in a Supporting Role | (Singapore) Lim Kay Tong for The Pupil (MediaCorp) | (Singapore) Chen Shu Cheng for With You (MediaCorp) |
| Best Actress in a Supporting Role | (Hong Kong) Susan Tse for Beyond the Realm of Conscience (Television Broadcasts Limited) | (Singapore) Constance Song for Together (Mediacorp) |
| Best Comedy Performance By an Actor/Actress | (Singapore) Chua En Lai for The Noose 3 (MediaCorp) | (Singapore) Michelle Chong for The Noose 3 (MediaCorp) (Singapore) Alaric Tay for The Noose 3 (MediaCorp) |

==== Technical & Creative Categories ====
| Category | Winner | Highly Commended |
|---|---|---|
| Best Cinematography | Storm Surfers – New Zealand Discovery Networks Asia-Pacific Discovery Channel Singapore Production Co: 6ixty Foot Films Pty Ltd | Passage to Malaysia – The Cradle Discovery Networks Asia-Pacific TLC Singapore Production Co: Reel Networks Sdn Bhd |
| Best Direction | Fight Masters: Silat National Geographic Channel Asia National Geographic Channel Singapore Production Co: GS Productions Sdn Bhd | The Pupil MediaCorp Pte Ltd Channel 5 Singapore Production Co: Film Formations |
| Best Editing | Hip Korea: Kim Yu Na Discovery Networks Asia-Pacific Discovery Channel Singapore Production Co: Bang Singapore Pte Ltd | Man Made Marvels – World's Biggest Subway Discovery Networks Asia-Pacific Discovery Channel Singapore Production Co: ITV Productions Limited |
| Terrestrial Channel of the Year | Channel 5 MediaCorp Pte Ltd Singapore | Channel 6 SBS (Seoul Broadcasting System) South Korea |
| Cable & Satellite Channel of the Year | Discovery Channel Discovery Networks Asia-Pacific Singapore | CNN-IBN IBN18 Network Ltd India |
| Terrestrial Broadcaster of the Year | MediaCorp Pte Ltd Singapore | Seoul Broadcasting System South Korea |
| Cable & Satellite Network of the Year | Discovery Networks Asia-Pacific Singapore | IBN18 Network Ltd India |

=== 2011 ===
==== Programming ====
| Category | Winner | Highly Commended |
|---|---|---|
| Best Documentary Programme (One-off/Special) | (China) Yu Guo and His Mother | (Japan) Our Prayers – Living in our Times (Japan) Julianise: Enslaved Girl of Haiti |
| Best Documentary Series | (Japan) The Soul of Reporting | (Singapore) Eye on Taiwan: The Search for Lost Fertility (Japan) Life Force |
| Best Natural History or Wildlife Programme | (Japan) Life Force: Madagascar | Wild Japan: The Wonders of Abundant Waters |
| Best News Programme | (China) Shanghai Live | (India) Pakistan: The War Within |
| Best Single News Story/Report | (Hong Kong) Bangladesh Begging Boy | (Japan) Departing in Dignity |
| Best Drama Series | (Taiwan) Days We Stared at the Sun (Episode 1) | (Taiwan) A Teacher's Heart |
| Best Single Drama or Telemovie Programme | (Japan) Threads of Our Hearts | (New Zealand) Stolen |
| Best Comedy Programme | (Singapore) The Noose (Season 4) | (Singapore) Anything Goes |
| Best Current Affairs Programme | (Japan) The Nonfiction Special “Unforgettable – Three Family Portraits” | (Singapore) The Highland Towers Disaster |
| Best Children's Programme | (Australia) My Place – 1878 Henry | (Taiwan) Sailing in the Dark |
| Best Preschool Education Programme | (China) Doby & Disy | (India) Bommi and Friends |
| Best Entertainment (One-off/Annual) | (Japan) Nep-Kids League: Whiz-Kids Theater! | (Singapore) MTV Video Music Aid Japan |
| Best General Entertainment Programme | (India) Jhalak Dikhhla Jaa (Season 4) | (Thailand) Game Phao Khon |
| Best Game or Quiz Programme | (Thailand) Wittaya Subphayuth | (Singapore) India's Minute to Win It (Season 1, Episode 2) (Thailand) Ratcharod Ma Koey |
| Best Music Programme | (Thailand) Muse & MTV EXIT: MK Ultra | (Malaysia) Akustik Raya |
| Best Reality Programme | (India) Girls Night Out | (Singapore) Love on the Plate |
| Best Infotainment Programme | (Singapore) China's Extreme Skywalker | (South Korea) Masterpiece Scandal (Episode 5) (Singapore) Ryan: The Smiling Serial Killer |
| Best Talk Show | (Philippines) The Bottomline with Boy Abunda | (Hong Kong) Talk Asia – Tom Ford |
| Best Social Awareness Programme | (Hong Kong) Nepal's Stolen Children | (Japan) Surviving the Tsunami |
| Best Adaptation of an Existing Formats | The Amazing Race Australia (Episode 1) | The Amazing Race – China Rush (Season One) |
| Best Cross-Platform Content | (India) The CJ Show | (Singapore) Living Cities: Transformation |
| Best Lifestyle Program | (Singapore) Stressbuster (Episode 1) – Learn Something New | (Singapore) Passage To Malaysia : Pulau Paradise |

==== Performance ====
| Category | Winner | Highly Commended |
|---|---|---|
| Best News Presenter or Anchor | (Hong Kong) Anna Coren for World Report (CNN International) | (Singapore) Martin Soong for Squawk Box (CNBC Asia Pacific) |
| Best Current Affairs Presenter | (Singapore) Bernard Lo for Straight Talk with Bernie Lo (CNBC Asia Pacific) | Najwa Shihab for Mata Najwa (The Eyes of Najwa) – Jakarta: Promises Overdue (PT. Media Televisi Indonesia, Metro TV) |
| Best Entertainment Presenter / Host | (Singapore) Denise Keller for Passage to Malaysia: Pulau Paradise | (Hong Kong) Steven Ma for Apprentice Chef |
| Best Actor in a Leading Role | (Hong Kong) Kevin Cheng for Ghetto Justice (Television Broadcasts Limited; TVB Jade) | (Singapore) Christopher Lee for Breakout (MediaCorp Pte Ltd, Channel 8) |
| Best Actress in a Leading Role | (Hong Kong) Charmaine Sheh for Can't Buy Me Love (Television Broadcasts Limited; TVB Jade) | (Taiwan) Ann Lee for Fairy SuZhen (Tzu Chi Culture and Communication Foundation, Da Ai TV) |
| Best Actor in a Supporting Role | (Hong Kong) Mak Cheung Ching for No Regrets (Television Broadcasts Limited; TVB Jade) | (Malaysia) Jordan Voon for Footprints In The Sand (Natseven TV Sdn Bhd, ntv7) (Production Co.: Double Vision) |
| Best Actress in a Supporting Role | (Hong Kong) Fala Chen for No Regrets (Television Broadcasts Limited; TVB Jade) | (Singapore) Pan Ling Ling for Breakout (Episode 21) (MediaCorp Pte Ltd, Channel 8) |
| Best Comedy Performance By an Actor/Actress | (Singapore) Suhaimi Yusof | (Singapore) Alaric Tay (Singapore) Chua En Lai |

==== Technical & Creative Categories ====
| Category | Winner | Highly Commended |
|---|---|---|
| Best Cinematography | (Singapore) Syukrie Hassan, Chris Tan, Jason Isley & Scubazoo | (Singapore) Koichi Nagura |
| Best Direction | (Australia) Michael McKay | (Singapore) Chris Lofft |
| Best Editing | (Singapore) Jean Kao | (Singapore) Leanne Cole (Singapore) Peter Potts |
| Best Drama Screenplay | (China) Yu Zheng | (Singapore) Ang Eng Tee (Singapore) Ng Lee Ling |
| Best Theme Song | (Philippines) Boy Christopher Ramos for "Star Confessions: OST – “Ito Ang Buhay ko” (This is My Life)" (ABC Development Corporation, TV5) | (Malaysia) Edry Abdul Halim for "Hambamu: Theme Song for Imam Muda Season 2" (Measat Broadcast Network Systems Sdn Bhd, Astro Oasis) |
| Terrestrial Channel of the Year | General TV Channel (NHK (Japan Broadcasting Corp.)) | (Japan) Fuji TV (Fuji Television Network, Inc.) |
| Cable & Satellite Channel of the Year | (Hong Kong) CNN International | (Singapore) Discovery Channel (Discovery Networks Asia Pacific) |
| Terrestrial Broadcaster of the Year | (Singapore) Mediacorp Pte Ltd | NHK (Japan Broadcasting Corp.) |
| Cable & Satellite Network of the Year | (Hong Kong) CNN International | (Singapore) Discovery Networks Asia-Pacific |

=== 2012 ===
==== Programming ====
| Category | Winner | Highly Commended |
|---|---|---|
| Best Documentary Programme (One-off/Special) | (Singapore) The President's Office; Discovery Channel Singapore; Imaging Image Production Ltd | (Singapore) Revealed: The Golden Temple; Discovery Channel Singapore; Pulse Media |
| Best Documentary Series | (Singapore) Extraordinary Asian – Episode 1: Angel Mums; Threesixzero Productions Pte Ltd; Mediacorp Channel U | (Singapore) Extraordinary Asian – Episode 2: God of Vision; Discovery Channel Singapore; Samsara Films |
| Best Natural History or Wildlife Programme | Primeval New Zealand; NHNZ; NHK Television New Zealand | Tiger Dynasty; Grey Films India Private Limited; BBC 2 |
| Best News Programme | (Hong Kong) First Up (Bloomberg LP) | (Singapore) Squawk Box Asia (CNBC Asia) |
| Best Single News Story/Report | (Japan) The Policeman Zookeeper – Caring for Animals, Caring for People (Kansai Telecasting Corporation) | (Chinese Taipei) A Letter To The Future (Formosa Television) |
| Best Drama Series | (South Korea) The Princess' Man (Korean Broadcasting System) | (Japan) DOCTORS: The Ultimate Surgeon (TV Asahi) (China) Empresses in The Palace (Guangzhou TV, Dongyang Flower Film&TV Culture) |
| Best Single Drama or Telemovie Programme | (Japan) Gaku (Dreamax TV, WOWWOW Inc.) | (South Korea) KBS Drama Special – Duet (Korean Broadcasting System) |
| Best Comedy Programme | (South Korea) Gag Concert – 600th Episode Special (Korean Broadcasting System) | (Thailand) Ching Roi Ching Lan Sunshine Day (Workpoint Entertainment, BEC World Public Company Limited) |
| Best Current Affairs Programme | The Untold Stories of the Tsunami in Japan – March 11, 2011 (Fuji Television) | (Chinese Taipei) Green China Rising (Mandarin Films, National Geographic Channel (Asia)) |
| Best Children's Programme | (Singapore) Art Attack Episode 10 – Shark's Fin & Matchstick Box Figur (The Walt Disney Company (SEA)) | (Australia) Dance Academy Series 2 (Australian Children's Television Foundation, Werner Film Productions) |
| Best Preschool Education Programme | (South Korea) Tayo the Little Bus (Iconix Entertainment, Educational Broadcasting System) | (Chinese Taipei) Rainy Day Friends (Public Television Service) |
| Best Entertainment (One-off/Annual) | (Indonesia) Closing Ceremony SEA Games 2011 (RCTI, Gramedia Media Nusantara) | (Singapore) MTV World Stage Live in Malaysia 2011 (MTV Southeast Asia); Star Parivaar Awards 2012 (Sol (production company), STAR India) |
| Best General Entertainment Programme | Athletic Fire- Japan's Best Known Celebrities Challenge the World's Best Female Athletes (Tokyo Broadcasting System | (Hong Kong) Project Lotus: The Search For Blush (STAR World, Far west Entertainment) |
| Best Game or Quiz Programme | India's Minute to Win it Season 2 (AXN, NBC Universal, Astro Productions, Blue Magic Films) | (Singapore) Cash Cab Asia Season 1 (AXN, ActiveTV Asia Pte Ltd) |
| Best Music Programme | (Singapore) MTV World Stage Live in Malaysia 2011 (MTV Southeast Asia) | (Japan) Nishi Hongwanji Sound Stage: East Meets West (Mainichi Broadcasting System) |
| Best Reality Programme | (Malaysia) What Men Want (NTV7, Phosumpro Sdn Bhd) | (Thailand) Ton Silapa 2 (Village Television, Thai Public Broadcasting Station, Index Creative Village) |
| Best Infotainment Programme | (Hong Kong) May Food Keep Us Together – Growing Old with Chinese Pastries (Peoples Production Limited, Next TV) | Long March Into Space (China Intercontinental Communication Center, Discovery Networks Asia Pacific) (Singapore) Junkie Monastery (AETN All Asia Networks, Biography Channel, The Moving Visuals Company) |
| Best Talk Show | (China) Culture Matters: The Tiger Mom Roars (Shanghai Media Group, International Channel Shanghai) | (Singapore) Lets Talk 2 (Mediacorp Channel U, Threesixzero Productions Pte Ltd); Teacher's Achievers Club (Miditech Pvt. Ltd., STAR India, Star World) |
| Best Social Awareness Programme | (Singapore) Junkie Monastery (AETN All Asia Networks, Biography Channel, The Moving Visuals Company) O| (Thailand) Enslaved: An MTV EXIT Special, Hosted by Jared Leto from Thirty Seconds to Mars (MTV Southeast Asia) | |
| Best Adaptation of an Existing Formats | The Amazing Race: China Rush Season 2 (Shanghai Media Group, International Channel Shanghai) | Survivor India (Miditech Pvt. Ltd., STAR India, Star World) |
| Best Cross-Platform Content | (India) The Citizen Journalist Show (TV 18 Broadcast Ltd., CNN-IBN) | (Singapore) Taiwan Revealed (Discovery Networks Asia Pacific, Article Taiwan) (Singapore) Supermodel Me (Mediacorp, KIX, Refinery Media) |
| Best Lifestyle Program | (Philippines) Chef Vs Mom (ABC Development Corporation, TV5) | (Malaysia) Axian Food Adventures (Season 2) (Astro, Measat Broadcast Network Systems Sdn Bhd) |
| Best 2D Animated Programme | (Singapore) Guess How Much I Love You (Scrawl Studios, Mediacorp) | (Japan) One Piece – The Beginning of the New Chapter! The Straw Hats Reunited! (Toei Company, Fuji Television) |
| Best 2D Animated Programme | (Singapore) Ben 10: Destroy All Aliens (Cartoon Network (Southeast Asia), Tiny Island Productions, Monkey Punch) | (China) Legend of Qin Season 3 (StarQ Animation Studio, Zhejiang Television) |

==== Performance ====
| Category | Winner | Highly Commended |
|---|---|---|
| Best News Presenter or Anchor | Anna Coren; World Report; CNN International; Hong Kong | Susan Li; First Up; Bloomberg LP; Bloomberg Television; Hong Kong |
| Best Current Affairs Presenter | Barkha Dutt; We The People with Hillary Clinton; New Delhi Television Ltd; NDTV 24X7; India | Korina Sanchez; Rated K – Kwento ng Buhay ko (This is my Life); ABS-CBN Corporation; ABS-CBN Channel 2 Philippines |
| Best Entertainment Presenter / Host | Oli Pettigrew; Cash Cab Asia Season 1 SPE Networks-Asia Pte Ltd; AXN Asia; Singapore | Lisa Ray; Oh My Gold! Discovery Networks Asia-Pacific Pte Ltd; TLC; Singapore |
| Best Actor in a Leading Role | Moses Chan; When Heaven Burns; Television Broadcasts Limited; TVB, Jade Channel; Hong Kong | Chen Jian Bin; Empresses in The Palace; Dongyang Flower Film&TV Culture Co., Ltd. Guangzhou TV; China |
| Best Actress in a Leading Role | Rui En; Unriddle II; MediaCorp Pte Ltd; Channel 8 Singapore | Debbie Goh; The Descendant; Media Prima, ntv7 Malaysia |
| Best Actor in a Supporting Role | Lucas Luo; Man • Boy; Public Television Service, Taiwan; Public Television Service Foundation, PTS; Taiwan | Devarajan Varadarajan; Point of Entry Season 2 MediaCorp Pte Ltd; Channel 5 Singapore |
| Best Actress in a Supporting Role | Nancy Wu; Gloves Come Off; Television Broadcasts Limited; TVB, Jade Channel; Hong Kong | Pan Ling Ling; A Song to Remember; Mediacorp Pte Ltd; Mediacorp 8 Singapore Jojo Goh; Forget Me Not; Media Prima, ntv7 Malaysia |
| Best Comedy Performance By an Actor/Actress | Michelle Chong; The Noose Season 5 Mediacorp Pte Ltd; Mediacorp 5 Singapore | Suhaimi Yusof; The Noose Season 5 Mediacorp Pte Ltd; Mediacorp 5 Singapore |

==== Technical & Creative Categories ====
| Category | Winner | Highly Commended |
|---|---|---|
| Best Cinematography | (Singapore) Brad Dillon; Fatal Attractions – There's a Crocodile in my Bed; Most Wanted Pictures; Animal Planet Japan; Production Co.: Oxford Scientific Films | (Singapore) Wayne Peng; City Made From The Sky; 10AM Communications Pte Ltd; Mediacorp, Channel NewsAsia; Production Co.: WP Productions |
| Best Direction | (Taiwan) Kevin H.J. Lee; No. 37, Huafushan; Public Television Service, Taiwan; Public Television Service Foundation, PTS | (Singapore) Galen Yeo & Ian White; Junkie Monastery; The Moving Visuals Co Pte Ltd; AETN All Asia Networks Pte Ltd, Bio Channel |
| Best Editing | | |
| Best Drama Screenplay | | |
| Best Theme Song | | |
| Terrestrial Channel of the Year | | |
| Cable & Satellite Channel of the Year | | |
| Terrestrial Broadcaster of the Year | | |
| Cable & Satellite Network of the Year | | |

== Acting award winners ==
Best Actor in a Leading Role

- 2009: Adrian Pang for Red Thread
- 2010: Bowie Lam for Sister of Pearl
- 2011: Kevin Cheng for Ghetto Justice
- 2012: Moses Chan for When Heaven Burns
- 2013: Chris Wu for Emerging Light
- 2014: Pierre Png for Zero Calling
- 2015: Zhang Jia-Yi for Forty-nine Days Memory
- 2019: William Hsieh for First Love

Best Actress in a Leading Role

- 2009: Michelle Yim for Moonlight Resonance
- 2010: Rebecca Lim for The Pupil
- 2011: Charmaine Sheh for Can't Buy Me Love
- 2012: Rui En for Unriddle 2
- 2013: Jade Chou for Falling
- 2014: Puteri Balqis Azizi for Balqis
- 2015: Zhou Xun for Red Sorghum
- 2019: Tisanart Sornsuek for True Life of a Drama Queen

Best Actor in a Supporting Role

- 2010: Lim Kay Tong for The Pupil
- 2011: Mak Cheung Ching for No Regrets
- 2012: Lucas Luo for Man • Boy
- 2013: Jeffrey Xu for Marry Me
- 2014: Rayson Tan for Entangled
- 2015: Lim Kay-Tong for Grace

Best Actress in a Supporting Role

- 2010: Susan Tse for Beyond the Realm of Conscience
- 2011: Fala Chen for No Regrets
- 2012: Nancy Wu for Gloves Come Off
- 2013: Aileen Tan for The Day It Rained on Our Parade
- 2014: Hsieh Chiung-Hsuan for Lonely River
- 2015: Nusba Punnakanta for The Secret Truth
- 2016: Tien Hsin for A Touch of Green

Best Comedy Performance by an Actor/Actress

- 2009: Chusak Iamsuk for Raberd Thurd Theung
- 2010: Chua En Lai for The Noose 3
- 2011: Suhaimi Yusof for The Noose Season 4
- 2012: Michelle Chong for The Noose Season 5
- 2013: Chua En Lai for The Noose
- 2014: Irene Ang for Spouse For House
- 2015: Ivana Wong for Come On, Cousin

== 26th Asian Television Awards ==
In light of the recent COVID-19 pandemic, the Asian Television Awards adapted into digital formats. Having started its very first online show for the 25th Asian Television Awards in 2021, the 26th edition was again held in an online format in December 10 and 11, 2021.

=== Performance category - Nominees ===
Winner

| Category | Nominee | Title of work |
|---|---|---|
| Best News Presenter or Anchor | Wang Mang Mang | Going Through 2020 |
| Best News Presenter or Anchor | Ken Lee | Formosa News |
| Best News Presenter or Anchor | Kishore Ajwani | Shereen Bhan |
| Best News Presenter or Anchor | Jose Ruperto Martin M. Andanar | Network Briefing News |
| Best News Presenter or Anchor | Rico Hizon | The Final Word with Rico Hizon |
| Best Current Affairs Presenter | Tian Wei | World Insight with Tian Wei |
| Best Current Affairs Presenter | Hu Wan-King | Taiwan History - The History of Taiwan Railway |
| Best Current Affairs Presenter | Anand Narasimhan | The Right Stand |
| Best Current Affairs Presenter | Marya Shakil | Epicentre |
| Best Current Affairs Presenter | JV Arcena | Laging Handa Dokyu |
| Best Entertainment Presenter/Host | Saithip Montrikul Na Audhaya | Club Friday Show |
| Best Entertainment Presenter/Host | Nurul Aini | Crash Landing on Schools |
| Best Entertainment Presenter/Host | Varavuth Jentanakul | Guess My Age Thailand |
| Best Entertainment Presenter/Host | Kiat Kitcharoen | First & Last Thailand |
| Best Entertainment Presenter/Host | Jaaved Jaaferi | Animals Gone Wild with Jaaved Jaaferi |
| Best Entertainment Presenter/Host | Niti Chaichitathorn | Talk with Toey |
| Best Sports Presenter/Commentator | Intan Saumadina | UEFA Champions League |
| Best Sports Presenter/Commentator | Kartika Berliana | NBA Weekend Showdown |
| Best Actor in a Leading Role | Lee Jeng-Ying | Rebirth |
| Best Actor in a Leading Role | Nirut Sirijanya (Nhing) | Teabox: Old Man and a Mad Dog |
| Best Actor in a Leading Role | Jeremy Chan | Crouching Tiger Hidden Ghost |
| Best Actor in a Leading Role | Pankaj Kapur | JL50 |
| Best Actor in a Leading Role | Hu Yitian | Go Go Squid 2: Dt, Appledog's Time |
| Best Actor in a Leading Role | Mark Chao | Ordinary Glory |
| Best Actor in a Leading Role | Lan Wei-Hua | Game of Solar Eclipse |
| Best Actor in a Leading Role | Korapat Kirdpan | The Gifted Graduation |
| Best Actress in a Leading Role | Satomi Ishihara | The Greatest Gift |
| Best Actress in a Leading Role | Joanne Peh | Mind Jumper |
| Best Actress in a Leading Role | Hsu Yen-Ling | The Child of Light |
| Best Actress in a Leading Role | Huma Qureshi | Maharani |
| Best Actress in a Leading Role | Ma Sichun | You Are My Hero |
| Best Actress in a Leading Role | Chu Xuan | Game of Solar Eclipse |
| Best Actress in a Leading Role | Ploypailin Thangprabhaporn | The Debut |
| Best Actress in a Leading Role | Jane Methika Jiranorraphat | After Dark |
| Best Actor in a Supporting Role | Pu Guo-Geng | Stay for Love |
| Best Actor in a Supporting Role | An Yuan-Liang | The Child of Light |
| Best Actor in a Supporting Role | Ranvir Shorey | Sunflower |
| Best Actor in a Supporting Role | Allan Wu | Crouching Tiger Hidden Ghost |
| Best Actor in a Supporting Role | Nattapon Raiyawong | The Path of Tiger |
| Best Actor in a Supporting Role | Hong Dou La-Si | Golden Years |
| Best Actor in a Supporting Role | Fu Zi-Chun | Golden Years |
| Best Actor in a Supporting Role | Nutthasit Kotimanuswanich | The Debut |
| Best Actress in a Supporting Role | Ruan Ciou-Heng | Stay for Love |
| Best Actress in a Supporting Role | Macy Chen Mei Xin | Mind Jumper |
| Best Actress in a Supporting Role | Tu Tai-Fong | The Child of Light |
| Best Actress in a Supporting Role | Bonnie Loo | Crouching Tiger Hidden Ghost |
| Best Actress in a Supporting Role | Janice Koh | Teenage Textbook : The Series |
| Best Actress in a Supporting Role | Dana Slosar | Extraordinary Siamese Story : Eng & Chang |
| Best Actress in a Supporting Role | Randapa Muntalumpa | The Circle of Love (2020) |
| Best Actress in a Supporting Role | Yuan Ai-Fei | Game of Solar Eclipse |
