= Anjali Rao =

Anjali Rao may refer to:

- Anjali Rao (journalist) (born 1974), Australian television news anchor and broadcast journalist
- Anjali Rao (actress), Indian actress
