= Lharn Poo Koo E-Joo =

Children's TV reality show

- Genre: Reality television Game show Children's television
- Presented by: Panya Nirunkul
- Country of origin: Thailand

Production
- Production company: Workpoint Entertainment

Original release
- Network: Channel 7

Lharn Poo Koo E-Joo (Thai: หลานปู่ กู้อีจู้) is a Thai children's television reality show produced by Workpoint Entertainment and hosted by Panya Nirunkul. In 2009, it was nominated for an International Emmy Award in the Children and Young People category, but was beaten by Dustbin Baby. Lharn Poo Koo E-Joo was the first Thai production to receive an International Emmy nomination. In 2008, the show won the Asian Television Award for Best Game or Quiz Programme.
