= Sai Lohit =

1976 novel by Sopark Suwarn

Sai Lohit สายโลหิต
- Author: Sopark Suwarn
- Original title: Thai: สายโลหิต
- Language: Thai
- Genre: Historical drama
- Publisher: Satrisara
- Publication place: Thailand

Sai Lohit (Thai: สายโลหิต English: Heritage - literal translation: Bloodline) is a Thai novel written by Sopark Suwarn, a National Artist of Thailand in Literature. It was first published in the magazine Satri Sarn in 1976 and is a Thai national historical novel set at the end of the Ayutthaya Kingdom (late 18th century). Through its characters, it tells the story of a kingdom's fall due to disunity and negligence. The novel has been adapted into four Thai television dramas, one each decade from the 1980s to 2010s. The novel remains in print.

== Plot ==
In the late Ayutthaya period of the Ayutthaya Kingdom, inquisitive Dao Rueng was raised by her Grandma Nim to be intelligent and independent. She found a kindred spirit in Khun Krai, a brave and honourable soldier, whose brother marries her sister. Muen Thip is a corrupt soldier and womanizer who becomes Khun Krai's rival and forces Dao Rueng to help him seduce Lady Yuern, Khun Krai's younger sister. When this is exposed, Dao Rueng confesses her part in the plot to Khun Krai. He forgives her and they become closer.

Khun Krai, his father, and Dao Rueng's brother are ordered to protect the kingdom from the Burmese Army, and in their absence, Muen Thip tried to marry Lady Yuern. Khun Krai is able to stop this, and Muen Thip collaborated with the enemy in an attempt to destroy Khun Krai. Both Khun Krai and his ally, Pan Singh are badly wounded in battle. Lady Yuern shelters and cares for Pan Singh, and they become engaged. However, because Khun Krai remains missing Lady Yuern is pressured to agree to marry Muen Thip. Khun Krai reappears and volunteers to fight again despite his wounds, and relocates the government due to Burma's advances.

After some time at war, Khun Krai and Dao Rueng are reunited and married, but he was ordered to the battlefront on their wedding night due to Muen Thip's meddling. As a soldier's wife, Khun Krai came to accept the losses of her life and became stronger. The Burmese Army breached the city walls, and Muen Thip's plans to switch sides were thwarted when he was mortally wounded by one of his servants. Khun Krai and a pregnant Dao Rueng attempt to escape the Burmese occupation when they meet Taksin the Great and joined his cause to liberate Ayutthaya territory.

Khun Krai continued to fight heroically and advanced quickly in the new military, but eventually died. Dao Rueng was strong for their children, who became her purpose in life, raising them to be dutiful and to serve the country, awaiting the day when it would be reunited.

== Characters ==
=== Main characters ===
- Khun Krai a.k.a. Luang Kraisoradech, Luang Krai – A brave soldier of Krungsri Ayuthaya. He is the son of Phraya Phiriya Saenphon Phai and Khun Ying Si Nuan, the youngest brother of Luang Thepparith Ari Satru Phai, and later Dao Rueng's husband.
- Dao Rueng – A granddaughter of Grandma Nim, daughter of Phra Suwan Raja and a late mother, youngest sister of Luang Sena Suraphak and Lamduan, and later Khun Krai's wife. The story follows her life from an inquisitive young girl to a dedicated family matriarch.
- Muen Thip Thesa a.k.a. Muen Thip or Khun Thip – An ambitious but fearful soldier, son of Phra Wichit and Khun Ying Prik, and a soldier of the Phraya Rattanathibet. He is the main rival of Khun Krai.
- Lady Yearn – Muen Thip's wife.

=== Khun Krai family ===
- Luang Theparith Ari Satru Phai – A soldier of Krungsri Ayuthaya, the elder brother of Khun Krai and Lam Duan's husband.
- Khun Ying Si Nuan – Khun Krai and Luang Theparith Ari Satru Phai's mother.
- Phraya Phiriya Saenphon Phai – A soldier of Krungsri Ayuthaya, husband of Khun Ying Si Nuan, father of Luang Theparith Ari Satru Phai, Lam Duan, and Khun Krai.

=== Dao Rueng family ===
- Lam Duan – A granddaughter of Grandma Nim, daughter of Phra Suwan Raja, younger sister of Luang Sena Suraphak, elder sister Dao Rueng, and wife of Luang Theparith Ari Satru Phai.
- Phra Suwan Raja – A general soldier in Krungsri Ayuthaya, the father of Luang Sena Suraphak, Lam Duan and Dao Rueng.
- Grandma Nim – The grandmother of Dao Rueng, mother of Phra Suwan Raja. She dies in Ayutthaya before the kingdom falls.

=== Muen Thip family ===
- Khun Ying Prik – The wife of Phra Wichit, and Muen Thip's mother.
- Phra Wichit – A brave soldier of Krungsri Ayutthaya, the husband of Khun Ying Prik, and father of Muen Thip.

=== Ban Phlu Luang dynasty ===
- Prince Uthumphon (Khun Luang Ha Wat) – He was the son of King Borommakot, younger brother of King Ekkathat. The 32nd Thai King of Ayutthaya, in Ban Phlu Luang dynasty.
- Somdet Phra Thinang Suriyat Amarin a.k.a. King Ekkathat (Khun Luang Khi Ruen) – The son of King Borommakot, elder brother of Prince Uthumphon, the 33rd Thai King of Ayutthaya, and the last king in Ban Phlu Luang dynasty before the Ayutthaya Kingdom fell.

=== Thonburi kingdom ===
- King Taksin the Great a.k.a. Phraya Tak (sin) – A former military officer of Kungsri Ayutthaya, who later became king of Thonburi. He was Krungsri Ayutthaya's saviour from Burma.

=== Chakri dynasty ===
- Phra Phutthayotfa Chulalok the Great a.k.a. Thongduang (King Rama I) – The first king of Chakri dynasty, previously a soldier in Phraya Tak, and elder brother of Maha Sura Singhanat.
- Maha Sura Singhanat a.k.a. Boonma – He was a soldier in Phraya Tak, and younger brother of King Rama I.

=== Konbaung dynasty ===
- King Alaungpaya – The first king of Konbaung dynasty, who died in battle while commanding an invasion of Ayutthaya.
- King Mang-lork – The second king of Konbaung dynasty.
- King Mang-Ra – The third king of Konbaung dynasty, who led the army that conquered Ayutthaya.

=== Other ===
- Pan Singh – A soldier serving under Khun Krai.

== Adaptations ==
There have been four Thai television adaptations of the novel:

| Year | Production | Main cast |
|---|---|---|
| 1986 | Channel 3 | Chatchai Plengpanich, Arphaporn Kornthip, Nopphol Komarachun, Ampa Phusit |
| 1995 | Channel 7 | Sornram Teppitak, Suvanant Punnakant, Sattawat Dullayavijit |
| 2003 | Channel 3 | Akara Amarttayakul, Pimolrat Pisolyabutr, Vorrarit Vaiyajieranai |
| 2018 | Ch7 HD | Saran Sirilak, Tisanart Sornsuek, Chanapol Sattaya, Nattasha Nauljam, Intira Jaroenpura |
