= Tisanart Sornsuek =

Thai television actress and model (born 1993)

- ทิสานาฏ ศรศึก
- Born: 5 May 1993 (age 32); Bangkok, Thailand
- Other names: Now; Nao; นาว
- Occupations: Actress; model
- Years active: 2010–present
- Agent: Channel 7 (2011–present)
- Height: 5 ft 4 in (1.63 m)

Tisanart Sornsuek (Thai: ทิสานาฏ ศรศึก; also known as Now or Nao (Thai: นาว), born 5 May 1993) is a Thai television actress and model. She is best known for her leading role acting in the movie Love Julinsee and television drama Kom Payabaht (2014), Kularb Len Fai (2014). She has acted in many Thai television series.

== Early life and education ==
Tisanart was born on May 5, 1993, in Bangkok, Thailand. She majored in Thai classical dancing arts Classical dance college. (Bachelor degree).

== Career ==
Tisanart made her acting debut with Jirayu La-ongmanee in a teenage film “Love Julinsee” before signing with Channel 7 in 2011. The film released on 3 March 2011. In the same year, she took on her first television series in the Thai drama Num, where she played the supporting role. And then, she starred her role as Dawan in the drama Horb Ruk Ma Hom Pah airing on Channel 7 in 2011.

In 2013, she had a supporting role in Aya Ruk. She would later become known for leading roles in Kom Payabaht and Kularb Len Fai in 2014. She also main starred in the 2016 drama series Atitha and Sarb Dok Soi, produced and aired by Channel 7. Likewise, she gained MAYA Awards in 2015.

In 2017, she starred in a leading role in the drama La Ong Dao (ละอองดาว) alongside Akkaphan Namart. In the same year, she starred in her second film Memoir, a Thai horror movie where she played the leading role with Jittaleela Suppanad.

She is one of popular television stars in Thailand.

== Filmography ==
=== Film ===
Year	Film	Role	Co-Stars
2011	Love Julinsee	Hatai	Jirayu La-ongmanee
2017	Memoir	Daranee	Jittaleela Suppanad
2026	The Dead Echoes		

=== Television series ===
Year	Title	Role	Notes
2011	Num	Punfu	Debut drama
2011	Horb Ruk Ma Hom Pah	Dawan	
2013	Seua Sang Fah 2: Payak Payong	Rachawadee (wadee)	
2013	Aya Ruk	Neua-Thong	
2013	Yommaban Chao Kha 2	Samru	
2014	Kom Payabaht	Noi / Noy / Marayart	Main cast
2014	Kularb Len Fai	Aom	Main cast
2016	Atitha	Jangapor / Jao Jan	Main cast
2016	Sarb Dok Soi	Dok Soi	Main cast
2017	La Ong Dao	La Ong Dao/Tan	Main cast
2018	Sai Lohit	Daorueng / "Dao"	Main cast
2019	Nang Rai	Kaewalai / "Kae"	
2019	Hua Jai Look Poochai	Pinpak / "Pin"	
2019	Duang Jai Kabot	Princess Saengjan	Suparburoot Jorm Jon
2019	Maturot Lohgan	Princess Saengjan	
2021	Wong Wean Hua Jai	Buppachart / Bow	
2021	Mae Bia	Mekkala / May	
2023	Soi Nakhee	Tawadee	
2025	Club Friday Theory of Love: Rueang Bang-oen Mai Mi Nai Lok	Eua	
