= Denise Keller =

Singaporean model and former VJ

- Born: Denise Lorraine Keller; 24 March 1982 (age 44); Singapore
- Spouse: Robert Gaxiola (m. 2015)
- Children: 2 daughters
- Website: www.denisekeller.com

Denise Lorraine Keller (born 24 March 1982) is a Singaporean model and former VJ for MTV Asia and currently hosts "Passage to Malaysia" on TLC, part of the Discovery Channel network.

== Early life ==
Born on March 24, 1982 in Singapore, she is of Malacca-Chinese Hakka and German ancestry. She was educated at the German European School Singapore in Singapore. She has a sister named Nadine Keller.

== Career ==
At age 13, she was discovered in a shopping mall by a modeling scout and signed with a modeling agency.

Keller became Singapore's representative in Ford's Supermodel of the World finals in 2000, for which she won the title. Throughout her modeling career, she has been the face of multiple TV and print commercial campaigns. Among the various TV shows she has hosted was the Ford Supermodel Singapore Finals in 2001.

By 2002, she had modeled internationally, from New York City to Hong Kong to Tokyo. And in that same year, she was selected to be the female VJ for MTV Asia. She has hosted two MTV Asia awards and has interviewed rock, pop, and hip hop superstars from all around the world.

In 2005, Denise Keller took part in Singapore's second English language reality dating program Eye for a Guy 2. In this program several eligible bachelors pursued the affections of Ms. Keller in this "Bachelorette"-style program. While well received by critics and its viewers, Eye for a Guy 2 was plagued by low viewership throughout most of its run. This only changed during the final two episodes when Ms. Keller made her choice among the final two suitors, Howard Shan Lo and Wolfgang Gorny. Even then, the final episodes were dogged by controversy regarding 'leaked' photographs of Denise Keller and Wolfgang Gorny together in Bali. Detractors of the series accused these 'leaked' photos to be nothing more than a ploy to increase viewership of the series. Eye for a Guy 2 ended with Denise Keller choosing Wolfgang Gorny as the man who won her affections. Despite the low viewership of the series, Keller was lauded as a more compelling bachelorette compared to the first series' bachelorette, Rachel Lee.

In September 2006, Keller and Dick Lee hosted a luxury lifestyle program shown in Singapore, entitled The Finer Side. This program featured the two hosts as they toured the glitzy and opulent side of Singapore and also featured candid chats with the city's rich, famous and powerful citizens regarding their extravagant lifestyles.

Also in September 2006, Keller took a two-month sabbatical break in order to study theater arts at the Lee Strasberg Theater Institute in New York City. Prior to this, she traveled to New York City to cover the MTV Video Music Awards for MTV Asia.

In 2007, Keller served as MasterCard's Fashion Ambassador for the Singapore Fashion Festival. She interviewed some of the world's top models and fashion designers in this capacity. She reprised this role in the 2008 Singapore Fashion Festival. Keller was the star of MasterCard's 'Priceless' campaign in Asia Pacific. Also in autumn 2007, Keller was a spokesperson for Hong Kong's Luxury week.

In 2008, Keller started to host Discovery Channel Travel & Living's new series Passage to Malaysia.

She was the host for the first season of a reality show for MediaCorp titled "Can You Serve?"

In 2016, Keller completed filming on a new series for the Discovery Channel, "Expedition X: Silk Road Rising" covering the new rise of the Silk Road, from China to Turkey.

== Personal life ==
In 2015, Denise tied the knot with Robert Gaxiola and they have 2 daughters, the first born in mid-2022 and second born in end-2024.
