= Anjali Rao (journalist) =

Global television news anchor and broadcast journalist (born 1974)

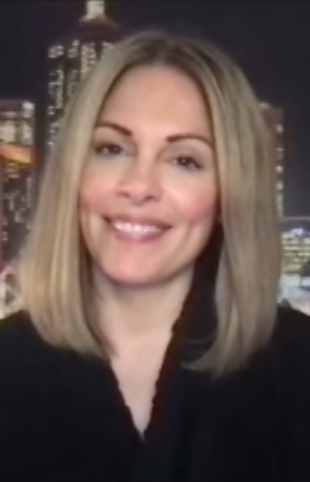
- Rao in 2021
- Born: 8 April 1974 (age 52); British Hong Kong
- Occupation: Journalist

Anjali Rao (born 8 April 1974) is an Australian global television news anchor and broadcast journalist. She starred on season 5 of The Real Housewives of Melbourne.

Rao has spent over 25 years in television journalism, as an anchor and correspondent for CNN International, Sky News UK, Channel 5 UK as well as hosting The Project and Studio 10 on Australia's Network 10 and for several years on SBS One public affairs program Dateline. She has also been host of the nightly news, current affairs and entertainment programme, The Anj, Rob and Robbo Show.

== Early life ==
Anjali Rao was born in Hong Kong, and educated mainly in England at Cobham Hall School, Kent, and King's School, Canterbury, followed by the City University, London, where she earned a bachelor's degree with Honours in Sociology and Media Studies. Her father was an Indian doctor, Dr Prithvi Raj Rao, from Bangalore, although born in Burma. He died suddenly at the age of 55, when she was almost five years old. Her mother, Cynthia Lockeyear, is from Bendigo, Victoria, Australia, and now lives in the UK.

== Career ==
Prior to joining CNN, Rao worked as a producer and reporter at Hong Kong's Wharf Cable Television and at the Seven Network in Melbourne, Australia. She went on to the principal news anchor role at Star TV where she won the top prize at the 2004 Amnesty International Human Rights Press Awards. In 2009, she was named Best Current Affairs Presenter at the Asian Television Awards while anchoring at CNN. Anjali has also been the recipient of a number of other prestigious awards, including a Peabody Award.

Rao is best known in the United Kingdom as a presenter for Sky News and Channel 5 news.

Rao was an anchor for CNN International, from January 2006 until her resignation in August 2012. She presented CNN's breakfast show live to the world from the television network's Asia news headquarters in Hong Kong. She also fronted CNN's flagship celebrity chat show TalkAsia.

Rao was featured on season 5 of The Real Housewives of Melbourne. On 21 November 2021, Rao quit the series.

On 30 November 2022, it was announced that Rao was cast on Australian Survivor: Heroes V Villains, being placed on the Villains tribe.
