= Dan Rivers =

English news correspondent

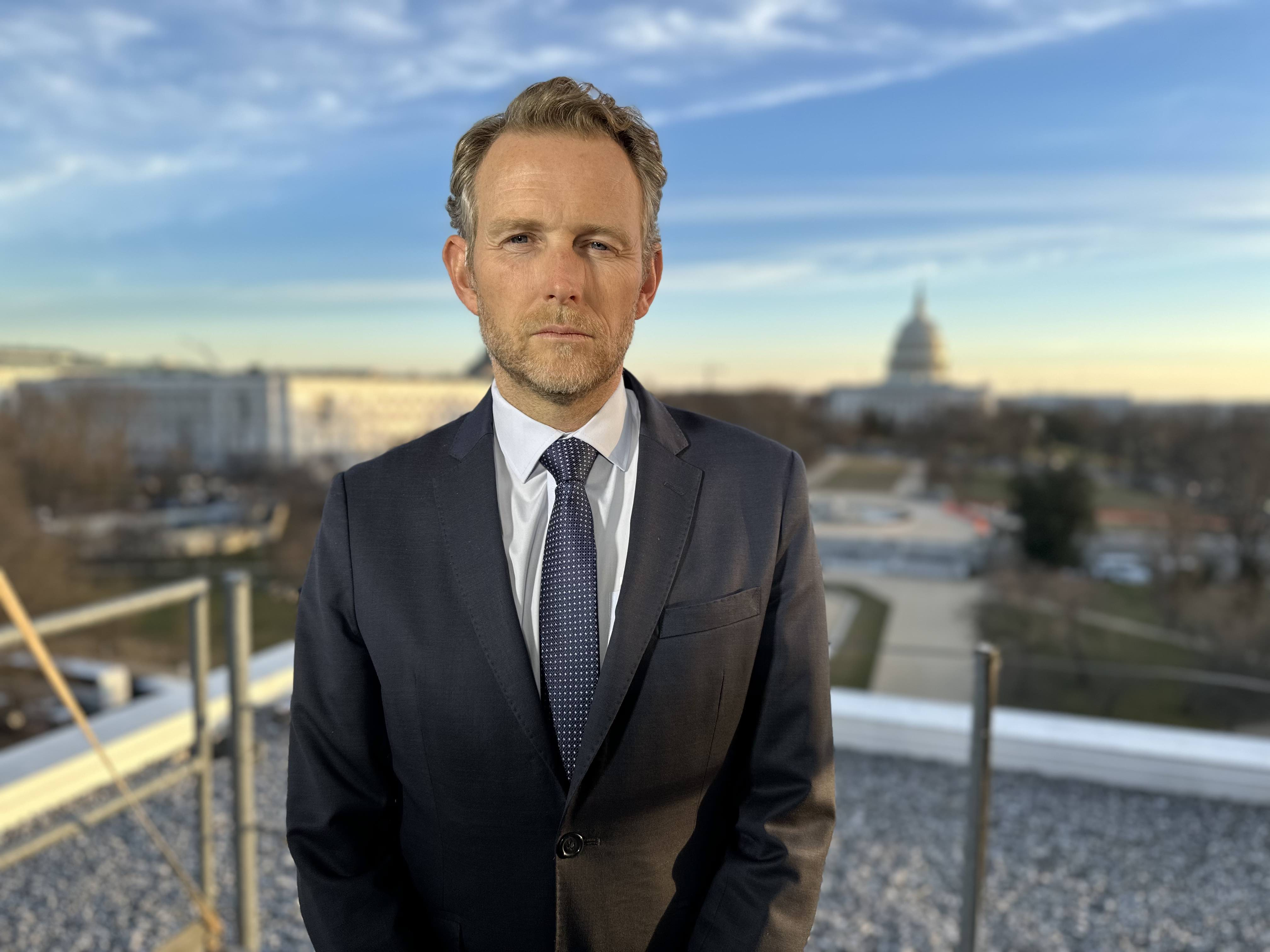
- Rivers in Washington DC
- Education: University College, Durham (BA)
- Occupation: Journalist
- Employer(s): ITV News, CNN, BBC
- Awards: 2009 George Polk Awards

Dan Rivers is US correspondent at ITV News, and a former correspondent at CNN and CNN International.

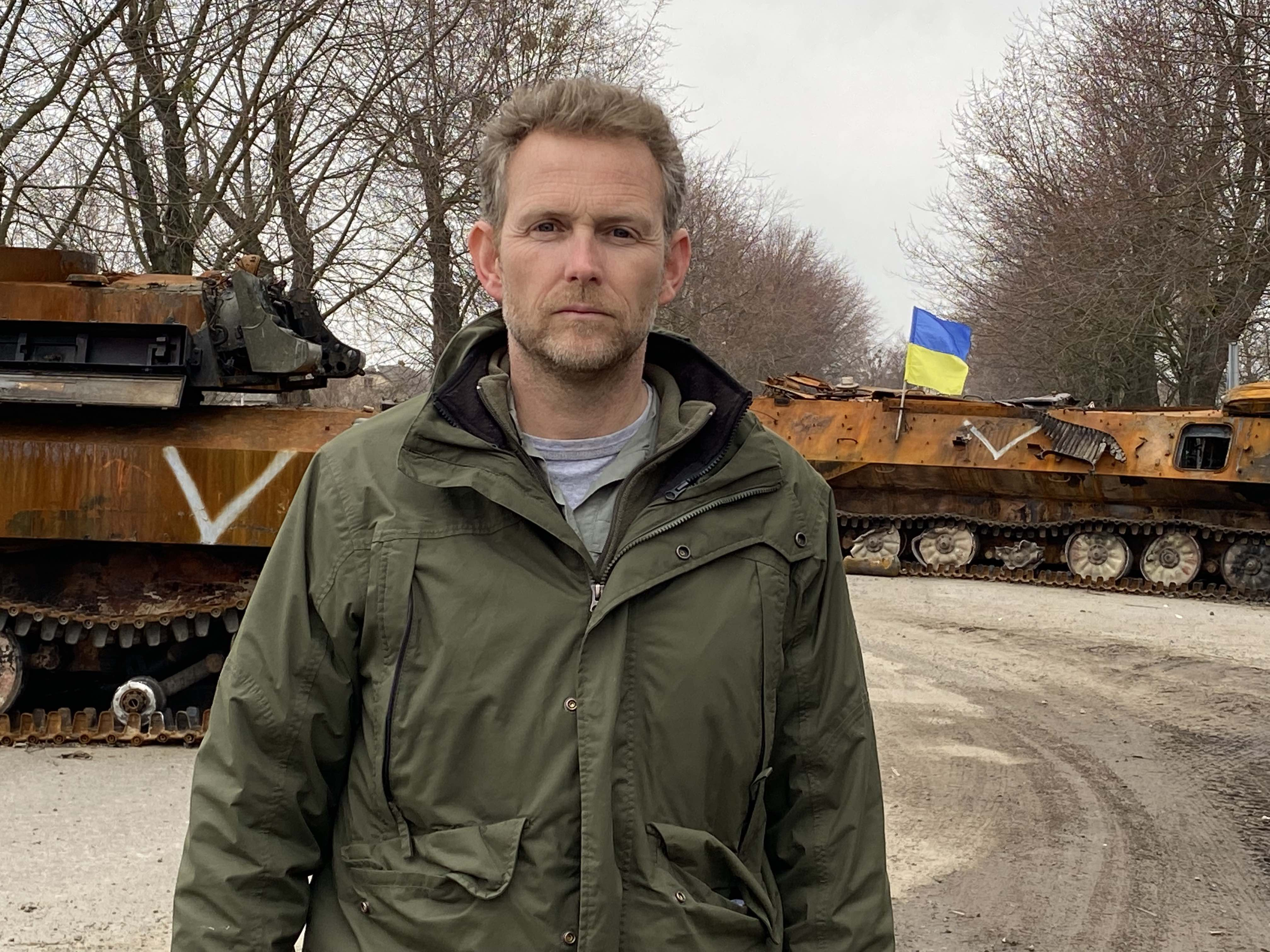
Dan Rivers reporting in Ukraine

== Education ==
Rivers was educated at Beechen Cliff School, a boys' state comprehensive school in the city of Bath in Somerset in South West England, followed by University College at Durham University where he studied social science, and Falmouth College of Arts, where he obtained a post-graduate diploma in broadcast journalism.

== Career ==
He started in BBC local radio in south-west Britain, in Cornwall and Devon. After a stint as a producer at BBC Radio Five Live, he worked at Euronews in Lyon for a year in 2000. In 2001 he joined ITV News later being promoted to Crime Correspondent.

He reported on Cyclone Nargis in Burma.

In 2010, Rivers joined CNN International as a senior international correspondent mainly covering South-East Asia from Bangkok.

He rejoined ITV News in 2013 as their Wales and West of England correspondent.

He was soon moved to cover predominantly international news based in London in 2014. He has covered a variety of international stories including the earthquakes in Nepal in 2015 and on-going assignments to Syria and the Middle East.

In 2022, Rivers covered the Russian invasion of Ukraine extensively. He was the first foreign journalist to report from Kharkiv on the same day missiles hit the main administrative building in the city. He filed reports from the front lines in the Donbas and Kyiv, as well as special reports detailing Russian war crimes.

In 2023, Rivers was appointed US Correspondent for ITV News, covering north America for ITV's main bulletins.

== Awards and nominations ==
- Shortlisted Royal Television Society Specialist journalism 2006
- Winner – 2009 George Polk Awards, for International Television Reporting
- Winner Cine Eagle Award 2009
- Winner Amnesty International Media Award 2009 – A forgotten People
- Winner Peabody Award for CNN's coverage of the Arab Spring in Libya 2011
- Nominated Monte Carlo Television award Gadhafi's Nanny 2012
- Nominated – News & Documentary Emmy Award for Outstanding Continuing Coverage of a News Story in a Regularly Scheduled Newscast
- Nominated for Royal Television Specialist of the year 2020 for coverage of the migrant crisis.
- Nominated Royal Television Society Specialist journalist of the year 2023 for Ukraine War Crimes coverage
- Winner 2023 Amnesty Broadcast News Award for Bucha War Crimes investigation

== Personal life ==
Dan Rivers is the only child of Dr. John Rivers, an eminent nutritionist who worked at the London School of Hygiene and Tropical Medicine carrying out pioneering work on famine relief in Ethiopia. His mother is a retired biochemist. Dan is married to Australian journalist Selina Downes.
