= Foodie 2 Shoes =

Hong Kong TV variety game show

- 味分高下
- Genre: Variety game show
- Presented by: Harlem Yu, Patrick Tang
- Opening theme: Foodie 2 Shoes altered and originated by Harlem Yu
- Country of origin: Hong Kong
- Original languages: Cantonese and Mandarin
- No. of episodes: 35 including special ending episode

Production
- Running time: approx. 20 minutes

Original release
- Network: Television Broadcasts Limited
- Release: August 28 – September 24, 2007

Foodie 2 Shoes (味分高下) is a Hong Kong television variety game show. It debuted in August 2007 until October 2007, broadcast from Tuesday to Friday. It consist of 34 episodes and a special ending episode. Foodie 2 Shoes is a joint collaboration between Taiwan and Hong Kong. The two hosts are Taiwan's popular singer/composer Harlem Yu and Hong Kong's actor/singer Patrick Tang. Along with the two hosts are eight lady helpers each representing a type of fruit or drinks known as Angels of Taste. Because of the difference in the host's background and native language, they both would attempt to speak each other's language, creating an entertaining atmosphere for the audience. In the beginning of each episode, Harlem would attempt to speak a Cantonese phrase or Patrick attempting a Taiwanese phrase, making the audience laugh and guessing what they are saying. Afterward, the hosts would give away a free zodiac figure made of 14k gold to an audience that can guess correctly the ingredients of a food sample. The show then continues with a variety of games that enable guests to use their five senses to differentiate various foods. Every two episodes will have four guests each in two pairs, often celebrities or famous figures. The purpose of the show aimed to draw the two culture together with food. Within each sense game, the winning pair will receive cash as reward and the amount differs in each game. At the end of each episode, the two pair of guests must play a simple game to determine who gets all the cash that was rewarded. Foodie 2 Shoes is the name of the first season. After it ended, the show aired its second season as Boom Boom Ba with new game concepts from February 2009 until end of March 2009.

== Game Format ==
Four celebrity guests, usually actors and singers, are invited each time for two episodes. They will be paired up into two teams. Each team will play in a variety of games to earn cash rewards. The games that the guest will play are randomly chosen by the producer among eight games that test the five senses of human being. Four of the eight games will be played according and each game rewards a different amount of cash rewards. After all games are played and cashes rewarded, there will be a fortune switch game to determine which pair of guest will get to keep all of the cash that was rewarded. In addition to the cash rewarded, the winner will also receive additional prizes. The team that lost will go home empty-handed. The audience are also able to win prizes at the beginning and intermission of each episode base on simple games.

== Angels of the Senses ==
Alongside with Harlem and Patrick are eight female assistance. Each assistance represents a different kind of fruit and drink.

| Assistance | Role |
|---|---|
| Doris Chow | Strawberry |
| GoGo Wai-yee CHEUNG | Pear |
| Angel Ho | Apple |
| Destiny Cheng | Orange |
| Jia Xiao-Chen | Soda |
| Eda Wai-yee CHAN | Milk Tea |
| Joey Mak | Cream |
| Calinda Yuen-wai CHAN | Mixed Fruit |

== Variety Games ==
Each guest that are invited to the show are subjected to play in four of the following eight games that relate to the five senses of human. There are two games that related to the sense of touch and three games related to taste. Each game is rewarded differently in cash amounts.

=== Sight ===
Each of the eight assistance carry a case holding a type of food sample and the guest must choose one among the eight cases. Within the cases are two dishes of the same type of food, however, one dish tastes gross with added extra ingredient while the other dish taste delicious. The pair of guest who does the choosing must sample a dish individually while the other pair of guest must observe their expressions. Base on observations, the other team must decide whether who is sampling the nasty dish or the normal dish. A correct guess would earn the team $5000 HK, yet a wrong guess would earn the sampling team $5000 HK. After the observing team guessed, they get to sample a choice of dish while the previous team does the observation for the same deal

=== Hear ===
A pair of guest sits between two boards preventing them to see what's behind the board. On one side of the boards is an edible substance while the other side contains something inedible. During the game, an Angel of Taste from each side of the board will provide sounds using the food item and non-food item respectively. After providing sounds from both items, the team must then decide within five seconds whether the left or right side contains the edible substance. Guessed right would earn the team $3000 HK along with the food item. However, guessed wrong would lead to punishments. Such punishment can either be asking the team to lick or take a bite out of the inedible item. The second team gets a chance to do the same as well.

=== Taste ===
One member from a team chooses a song to sing while being blindfolded. During the time they are singing, the guest must take our their tongue from time to time to lick sauces that Harlem and Patrick give them. After the song ended, the guest uncovers their eye and try to recall as many sauces as possible. Each correct guess would earn the team $500 HK. In addition to earning cash from guessing the sauces, Harlem would judge how well the guest sang on a scale of 0-10. With 10 being the highest, whatever score he gives the guest is multiply by $1000 HK. The maximum amount of cash the guest can get from singing is $10000 HK.

=== Touch ===
One member of a team stands before a board wall with openings for both hands. Both hosts enable the guest to touch two items: an edible and inedible item. The guest does not get to freely touch the items, but are limited to as much as the host wants them to touch. After contact with the items consecutively, the guest must decide whether which item he touched is edible. Guessed correctly would earn the team $5000 HK. Harlem would hit the guest with the inedible item if guessed incorrectly.

=== Smell ===
A team member is blindfolded while sitting between two board wall with an opening. Each side of a board is a taste Angel attempting to send odor from an item to the guest through the opening. One Angel will be sending odor from an edible dish while the other is sending odor from a dish that has added an extra ingredient for disgust. After smelling both sides respectively, the guest must decide within five seconds whether the right or left hand side contains the edible dish base on their sense. Guessed correctly would earn the team $5000 HK. However, punishment applies if guessed wrong. Both team member either have to taste or take a bite of the inedible dish.

=== Lick ===
Both team members are given a dish with sauce left-overs. By licking the sauce, the guests are expected to name the ingredients to make the dish. Each correct ingredient would earn the team $1000 HK. If the team can possibly name the dish, $5000 HK would be awarded in addition to each ingredients guessed correctly.

=== Feel ===
A certain taste Angel points out a specific part of her body. This indicates that one member of a team will use that part of their body to feel on items while blindfolded. Harlem and Patrick each will put an item on that part of the guest's body for them to feel on. One item will be edible and the other is not. Guessed correctly which of the two items is edible will earn the team $5000 HK.

=== Eat ===
Pair of guest decides on who is eating and who is passing. The one eating is blindfolded and the one passing must use an extra-long chopstick to transfer food from an in-circular motion table to the mouth of the blindfolded guest. The passer can choose whichever food item to transfer. Once a transfer is good, the blindfolded guest must guess correctly what the food item is in order to count as successful. If wrong, guest will have to try again on next transfer. Within a time limit, each team must transfer and guess correctly as many food item as possible. The team with the most successful transfers and guesses is awarded $5000 HK

=== Fortune Switch ===
At the end of every episode, all the cash rewards will be put at stake for a team to take. Both team must play a simple game chosen randomly by Harlem to determine the rightful owner of the cash prize. At the end of a first episode, all the cash prize is held by the winning team. However, the end of a second episode will allow the final winning team to take all the cash rewarded home in addition with many other prizes. Because every four guests get to be on the show for two episodes, two fortune switch game is played to determine who gets all the money home.

==== Games (all time-limited) ====
- Biggest apple bite
- Poking the most fish balls
- Largest watermelon bite
- Most corn eaten
- Shaking the most toothpicks out
- Loudest for opening a bag of chips

Loser must hand over all their cash rewards to the winning team.

== Guest List ==
| Episode | Date | Guest | Winner | Cash Rewarded (HK$) |
| 1; 2 | 8/28 (Tuesday); 8/29 (Wednesday) | Hacken Lee, Bernice Liu; Charlene Choi, Cheung Tat-Ming | Hacken Lee, Bernice Liu | $42000 |
| 3; 4 | 8/30 (Thursday); 8/31 (Friday) | Bobby Au-yeung, Yoyo Mung; Suki Chui, Eric Suen | Bobby Au-Yeung, Yoyo Mung | $24500 |
| 5; 6 | 9/4 (Tuesday); 9/5 (Wednesday) | Shirley Yeung, Michael Tse; Ronald Cheng, Cherrie Ying | Shirley Yeung, Michael Tse | $46500 |
| 7; 8 | 9/6 (Thursday); 9/7 (Friday) | Wong Hei, Angela Tong; Carlo Ng, Ella Koon | Wong Hei, Angela Tong | $51500 |
| 9; 10 | 9/11 (Tuesday); 9/12 (Wednesday) | Steven Ma, Fala Chen; Hins Cheung, Race Wong | Steven Ma, Fala Chen | $55500 |
| 11; 12 | 9/13 (Thursday); 9/14 (Friday) | Yumiko Cheng, Lawrence Ng; Nancy Sit, Kenny Wong | Yumiko Cheng, Lawrence Ng | $57500 |
| 13; 14 | 9/18 (Tuesday); 9/19 (Wednesday) | Louis Yuen, Toby Leung; Cutie Mui, Timmy Hung | Louis Yuen, Toby Leung | $52000 |
| 15; 16 | 9/20 (Thursday); 9/21 (Friday) | Amanda Strang, Vincent Kok; Kate Tsui, Tin Kai-Man | Kate Tsui, Tin Kai-Man | $59000 |
| 17; 18 | 9/24 (Monday); 9/26 (Wednesday) | Christine Ng, Joel Chan; Jason Chan, Jade Kwan | Jason Chan, Jade Kwan | $47500 |
| 19; 20 | 9/27 (Thursday); 9/28 (Friday) | Charmaine Sheh, Chin Ka Lok; Edmond Leung, Vanessa Yeung | Charmaine Sheh, Chin Ka Lok | $52500 |
| 21; 22 | 10/2 (Tuesday); 10/3 (Wednesday) | Kathy Chow, Ken Wong; Sharon Chan, Wong Yi Hing | Sharon Chan, Wong Yi Hing | $58500 |
| 23; 24 | 10/4 (Thursday); 10/5 (Friday) | Vincy Chan, Gill Mohindepaul Singh; Louisa So, Benz Hui | Louisa So, Benz Hui | $57500 |
| 25; 26 | 10/8 (Monday); 10/9 (Tuesday) | Eileen Tung, Ng Wai Kwok; Tavia Yeung, Chris Lai Lok Yi | Eileen Tung, Ng Wai Kwok | $45000 |
| 27; 28 | 10/10 (Wednesday); 10/11 (Thursday) | Stephy Tang, Lau Yi Ta; Elanne Kong, Benette Pang | Elanne Kong, Benette Pang | $57500 |
| 29 | 10/12 (Friday) | Pakho Chau, Yan Ng, Renee Tai, Miki Yeung; Bianca Wu, Ken Hung, Sukie Shek, Don Li | Bianca Wu, Ken Hung, Sukie Shek, Don Li | $50000 |
| 30; 31 | 10/15 (Monday); 10/16 (Tuesday) | Sunny Chan, Alvina Kong; Stephanie Cheng, Danny Summers | Sunny Chan, Alvina Kong | $57000 |
| 32; 33; 34 | 10/17 (Wednesday); 10/18 (Thursday); 10/19 (Friday) | Diana Pang, Nat Chan, Niki Chow, Alex Fong; Gillian Chung, Bill Shek Sau, Ada Choi, Kenny Kwan | Gillian Chung, Bill Shek Sau, Ada Choi, Kenny Kwan | $168000 |
| 35 (Foodie 2 Shoes Ultimate Ending) | 10/28 (Sunday) | Taiwan Team: Blackie, Lollipop, Joe Cheng, Jocelyn, Hor Dok Lin, Jason Yuen, Ah Ya, KIMI, Kym Sa, Michelle Lin , Maria Cordero, Jin Kong; Hong Kong Team: Eric Tsang, Sonjia Kwok, Angela Tong, Ankie Beilke, Amanda Strang, Chin Ka Lok, Michael Tse, Timmy Hung, Bosco Wong | Hong Kong: Eric Tsang, Sonjia Kwok, Angela Tong, Ankie Beilke, Amanda Strang, Chin Ka Lok, Michael Tse, Timmy Hung, Bosco Wong | TWD$1,190,000 (Approx. HK$284,972) |

== Complaints ==
During the process of the games played, much food was wasted and some acts caused disturbance. When playing the Sight game, some guest spits food out in front of the camera and towards the audience. In the Eating game, dish after dishes of food are dropped to the floor wasted when a guest can not catch it with their mouth. Moreover, the Smell game punishes guest to bite diapers or lick disturbing substances when they guessed wrong. This caused the show to receive multiple complaints from the viewers.
