= TalkAsia =

Weekly talk show on CNN International

- Genre: Talk show program
- Presented by: Anna Coren
- Original language: English

Production
- Production location: Asia
- Running time: 30 minutes

Original release
- Network: CNN International

TalkAsia is a weekly half-hour interview show on CNN International, produced from the network's Asia-Pacific headquarters in Hong Kong. Each month, the show features a candid and in-depth conversation between a CNN correspondent and a newsmaker from the field of arts, politics, sports or business.

Guests who have appeared on Talk Asia include Victoria Beckham, Deepak Chopra, Manny Pacquiao, Regine Velasquez, A. R. Rahman, Lady Gaga, Michelle Yeoh, Jason Mraz, Tadashi Yanai, Giorgio Armani, Yingluck Shinawatra, Kumar Sangakkara, Homare Sawa, Gary Locke, Julia Gillard, Gong Yoo and Big Bang.
